= Tetepare language =

Extinct language of the Solomon Islands

Tetepare
- Native to: Solomon Islands
- Region: Tetepare Island, Western Province.
- Extinct: (date missing)
- Language family: Unclassified Northwest Solomonic?

Language codes
- ISO 639-3: None (mis)
- Glottolog: None

Tetepare is an extinct language of Tetepare Island. According to local oral history, the indigenous people of the now-uninhabited island of Tetepare spoke their own language, different from the other languages of the region.

== Classification ==
Published materials are insufficient to establish whether this language was an Austronesian language like most of the surrounding languages (Roviana, Marovo and the rest of the New Georgia subgroup), or a non-Austronesian language like neighboring Touo. Language maps sometimes show the Touo language extending to Tetepare Island, but this seems to be an accident.

== See also ==
- Northwest Solomonic languages
- Kazukuru language
