= Marovo =

Marovo can refer to:

- Marovo Island, an island in the Solomon Islands
- Marovo Lagoon, a lagoon in the Solomon Islands.
- Marovo language, a language spoken on islands in and around the lagoon.
