= Duke language =

Austronesian language spoken in the Solomon Islands

Nduke
- Duke
- Native to: Solomon Islands
- Region: Kolombangara island
- Native speakers: (2,300 cited 1999)
- Language family: Austronesian: Malayo-Polynesian; Oceanic; Northwest Solomonic; New Georgia – Ysabel; New Georgia; Nduke

Language codes
- ISO 639-3: nke
- Glottolog: duke1237

Duke (Nduke, pronounced N-doo-kay) is an Oceanic language now spoken by about 3,000 people on Kolombangara island, Solomon Islands. Duke is an exonymic name (not used by speakers themselves). Endonymic names (used by the speakers themselves) are Dughore (Ndughore) and Kolei. Dughore is also a name for an area in southwest Kolombangara, Kolei is the general bilateral address term specific to Nduke. A more recent alternative name is 'Kolombangara' (after the name of the island).

== Social linguistics ==
Oral history in Dughore recounts that the northwest, northeast and southeast of Kolombangara had their own languages, which became extinct when the people of those areas were annihilated in warfare that probably occurred in the early 19th century. The people of the southwest built a series of hill fortresses and survived. At the beginning of the colonial period (about 1900), Duke had about 250 speakers, all concentrated in the southwest.

Inter-island exchange with neighbouring island language areas of Vella Lavella, Simbo and Roviana was strong in the latter 19th century, possibly leading to some language borrowing, although marriage remained largely endogamous at that time. In the early twentieth century, colonial rule instituted Roviana as a lingua franca, and the Seventh-day Adventist church, which was widely adopted on Kolombangara, used Bible materials written in Marovo. By the mid-twentieth century marriages to Marovo became numerous and many households are bilingual Duke–Marovo. Roviana, although it ceased to be a regional lingua franca in the 1960s, is still widely understood by Duke speakers. Twentieth-century borrowing from Roviana and Marovo has occurred to a small extent.

From the 1960s onward many marriages have taken place across the wider Solomons, leading to mixed-language communities, at the same time that Solomon Pijin has risen to prominence as a national language. As a result, Pijin is a widely used household language on Kolombangara, which in some families has almost fully replaced Duke. Additionally, re-orientation of the economy away from the traditional Oceanic lifestyle has led to less reliance on traditional ecological knowledge and traditional technology, so that many specialist terms have largely been forgotten. The lexical richness of the language is now markedly less among speakers under 40 years old. Ethnologue rates the language as 'vigorous'.

== Orthography ==
Orthography refers to the spelling system used to write words down. The Nduke alphabet is based on the Latin alphabet. The first systematic orthography was used by A. M. Hocart in 1908 to document a Nduke wordlist and Nduke anthropological fieldnotes. These sources were never published and did not form the basis for later orthographies. Two variant orthographies arose in local use, based on that used by the Methodist mission for Roviana, and that used by the Seventh-day Adventist mission for Marovo. These missions arrived in Nduke in 1917 and 1919 respectively. Recent lexical work on Nduke has used a composite of these two orthographies to avoid ambiguity.

Nduke orthography
IPA	a	mb	nd	e	ɣ	h	i	k	l	m	n	ŋ	ŋg	o	p	r	s	t	u	β	z
Hocart	a	mb	nd	e	gh	h	i	k	l	m	n	ng	ngg	o	p	r	s	t	u	v	z
SDA	a	b	d	e	gh	h	i	k	l	m	n	ng	g	o	p	r	s	t	u	v	z
Methodist	a	b	d	e	g	h	i	k	l	m	n	n	q	o	p	r	s	t	u	v	z
Composite	a	b	d	e	gh	h	i	k	l	m	n	ng	q	o	p	r	s	t	u	v	z

There are five diphthongs: /ei/, /ai/, /ae/, /au/, and /oi/

== Pronouns and possessives ==
The pronoun series is typically Oceanic. In addition to the basic forms tabulated below, dual and trial forms exist.

Personal pronouns
		singular	plural
1st person	exclusive	rai	ghami
1st person	inclusive		ghita
2nd person		ghoi	ghamu
3rd person		aia	ria

Possession may be grammatically marked in two ways. Preposed possessive particles can be used. 'Inalienable' possession, as in the case of body parts, kin, or inherent characteristics, can be marked by possessive suffixes.

Possessives
		singular		plural	
		preposed	suffix	preposed	suffix
1st person	exclusive	qu	-qu	-ma	
1st person	inclusive	qu	-qu	noda	-da
2nd person		mu	-mu	mi	-mi
3rd person		nona	-na	di	-di

Modern Nduke is tending away from use of these possessive series in preference for the general possessive marker ta, as in mata ta rai ('my eye').

== Deixis ==
Deictic terms are 'pointing words'. In addition to the personal deixis (pronoun and possessive) series above, Nduke has classes of words for spatial and time deixis.

Spatial deictic terms
Relation	Gloss	Deictic adverbs	Demonstrative Singular	Demonstrative Plural
1P	near speaker	hai	hoa	hora
2P	near addressee	hane/sane	hana/sana	hara/sara
3P	distant from both	hoze	hoi	hore

Directional verbs for participant motion
Directional term	Direction of motion indicated	Gloss
mai	toward the speaker	come
la, lagho	away from speaker	go
atu	toward addressee	follow

Relational directional verbs
Gloss	Directional	Deictic centre	Directional	Gloss
ascend hill	tete	← ⋅ →	iqo	descend hill
up	saghe	← ⋅ →	ghore	down
sunrise direction	saghe	← ⋅ →	ghore	sunset direction
enter	lughe	← ⋅ →	kakaha	exit

== Documentation ==
Sources for documentation of Nduke language have been noted by Palmer 2005. Grammar notes above have been sourced from Scales 1997. Wordlists include Hocart 1908, Tryon and Hackman 1983, and an online wordlist based on Tryon and Hackman. Lexical and Bible translation work are currently underway.
