= Zazao language =

Austronesian language spoken in the Solomon Islands

Zazao
- Native to: Central Solomon Islands
- Region: Santa Isabel Island
- Native speakers: (10 cited 1999)
- Language family: Austronesian: Malayo-Polynesian; Oceanic; Northwest Solomonic; New Georgia – Ysabel; Ysabel; Central Isabel; Zazao

Language codes
- ISO 639-3: jaj
- Glottolog: zaza1245
- ELP: Zazao
- Zazao is classified as Critically Endangered by the UNESCO Atlas of the World's Languages in Danger.

Zazao is an Oceanic language spoken in the Solomon Islands. Its speakers live on Santa Isabel Island. It is classified as "critically endangered" by the UNESCO Atlas of the World's Languages in Danger, because its speakers usually speak the Cheke Holo language or the Zabana language.
