= Northwest Solomonic languages =

Branch of the Oceanic languages

Northwest Solomonic
- Geographic distribution: Solomon Islands
- Linguistic classification: Austronesian: Malayo-Polynesian; Oceanic; Western Oceanic; Meso-Melanesian; New Ireland – Northwest Solomonic; St George linkage; Northwest Solomonic
- Proto-language: Proto-Northwest Solomonic
- Subdivisions: Nehan–North Bougainville; Piva–Bannoni; Mono–Uruavan; New Georgia–Ysabel

Language codes
- Glottolog: nort3225

The family of Northwest Solomonic languages is a branch of the Oceanic languages. It includes the Austronesian languages of Bougainville and Buka in Papua New Guinea, and of Choiseul, New Georgia, and Santa Isabel (excluding Bugotu) in Solomon Islands.

The unity of Northwest Solomonic and the number and composition of its subgroups, along with its relationship to other Oceanic groups, was established in pioneering work by Malcolm Ross.

== Languages ==
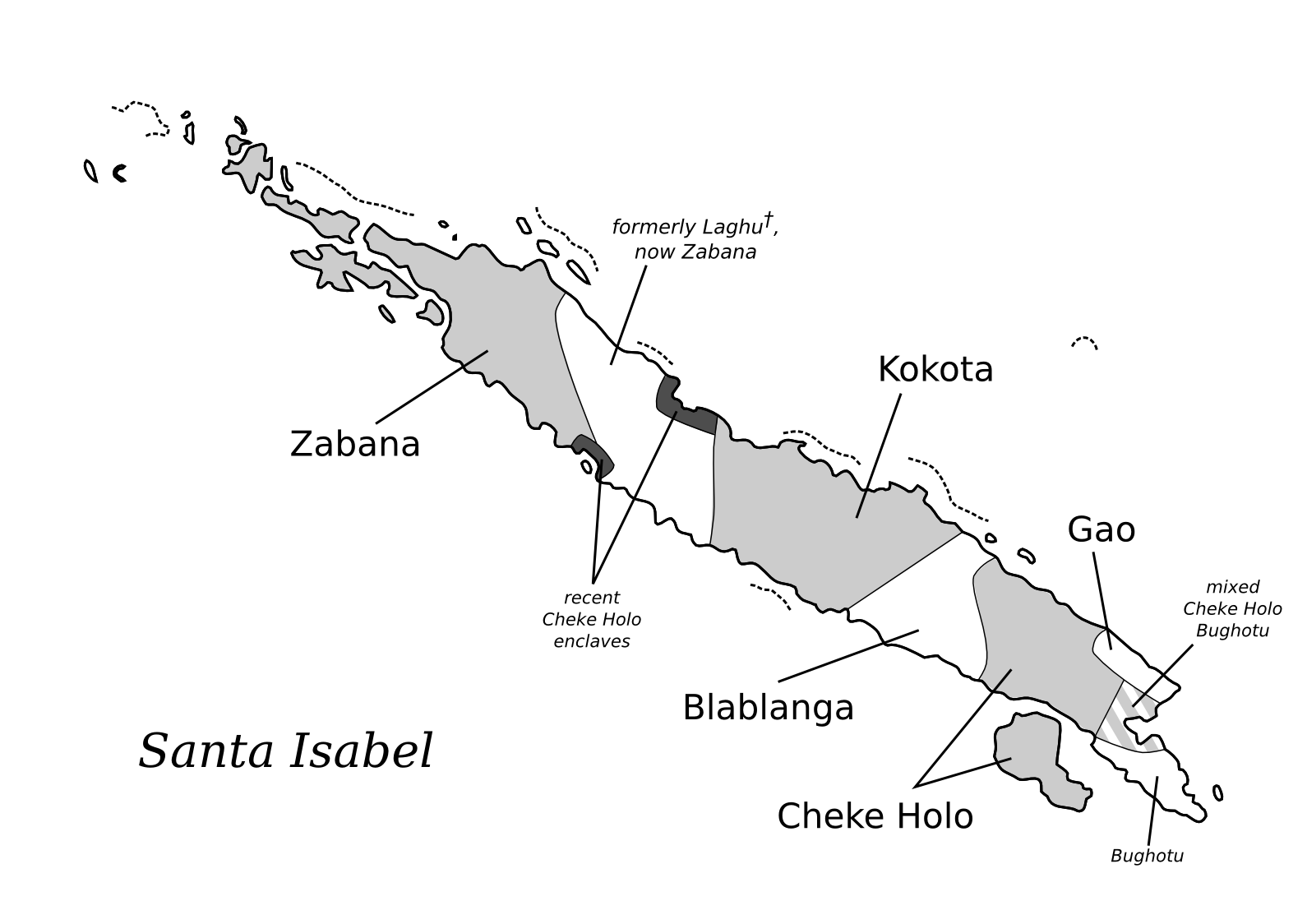
Languages of Santa Isabel

Northwest Solomonic languages group as follows:

- Nehan – North Bougainville linkage
  - Nehan (Nissan)
  - Saposa–Tinputz: Hahon, Ratsua, Saposa (Taiof)–Teop, Tinputz
  - Buka: Halia–Hakö, Petats
  - Papapana
  - Solos
- Piva–Bannoni family: Piva (Lawunuia), Bannoni
- Mono–Uruavan family: Mono-Alu, Torau, Uruava
- Choiseul linkage: Babatana (including Sisingga)–Ririo, Vaghua–Varisi
- New Georgia – Ysabel family
  - New Georgia linkage: Simbo (Simbo Island), Roviana–Kusaghe, Marovo, Hoava, Vangunu (Vangunu Island), Nduke (Kolombangara Island), Ghanongga (Ranongga Island), Lungga (Ranongga Island), Ughele (North Rendova Island)
  - Ysabel linkage: Zabana (Kia)–Laghu^{†}, Kokota–Zazao (Kilokaka)–Blablanga, Gao–Cheke Holo (Maringe, Hograno)

In addition, the extinct Kazukuru language was probably one of the New Georgia languages. The unclassified extinct language Tetepare might have also been one of the New Georgia languages, if it was Austronesian at all.

== Basic vocabulary ==
Basic vocabulary in many Northwest Solomonic languages is aberrant, and many forms do not have Proto-Oceanic cognates. Below, Ririo, Zabana, and Maringe are compared with two Southeast Solomonic languages. Aberrant forms are in bold.

English	arm	ear	liver	bone	skin	louse
Proto-Oceanic	*lima	*taliŋa	*qate	*suRi	*kulit	*kutu
Ririo	**karisi**	**ŋgel**	**tutuen**	**punda**	**kapat**	utu
Zabana	**kame**	taliŋa	**kola**	**huma**	**kafu**	gutu
Maringe	lima	**khuli**	**khebu**	**knubra**	guli	**theli**
Gela	lima	**kuli**	ate	huli	gui-guli	gutu
Arosi	rima	kariŋa	**rogo**	su-suri	ʔuri-ʔuri	kote
