= Zabana =

Zabana may refer to:

- Zabana language, an Oceanic language spoken in the Solomon Islands
- Zabana!, a 2012 Algerian film
