= Vangunu language =

Austronesian language spoken in the Solomon Islands

Vangunu
- Native to: Solomon Islands
- Region: Vangunu Island
- Native speakers: (910 cited 1999)
- Language family: Austronesian: Malayo-Polynesian; Oceanic; Northwest Solomonic; New Georgia – Ysabel; New Georgia; Vangunu

Language codes
- ISO 639-3: mpr
- Glottolog: vang1243

Vangunu is an Oceanic language spoken by about 900 people on Vangunu Island, Solomon Islands. Speakers of Vangunu also use the closely related Marovo.
