= Ughele language =

Austronesian language spoken in the Solomon Islands

Ughele
- Native to: Solomon Islands
- Region: north Rendova Island
- Native speakers: (1,200 cited 1999)
- Language family: Austronesian: Malayo-Polynesian; Oceanic; Northwest Solomonic; New Georgia – Ysabel; New Georgia; Ughele

Language codes
- ISO 639-3: uge
- Glottolog: ughe1237

Ughele is an Oceanic language spoken by about 1200 people on Rendova Island, located in the Western Province of the Solomon Islands.

There is no internal dialect differentiation.

== Phonology ==
The following information is gathered from Benedicte Haraldstad Frostad. A Grammar of Ughele: A Language of The Solomon Islands. 2012. Pages 35–48

=== Vowel inventory ===
Ughele contains a five-vowel inventory that is typical of most Oceanic languages. These are differentiated by changes in the place of articulation and the degree of stricture required to produce the sound. Lip rounding only accounts for the differentiation of two segments. These are the close-mid back vowel /o/ and the close back vowel /u/.

This inventory consists of three front vowels: /i/, /e/, /a/; two back /o/, /u/ and no central phonemes.

There is no variation in vowel length.

==== Minimal pairs ====
===== Distinguished by place of articulation =====
/veke/ and /veko/ - 'flying fox' and 'bald'
/ɣami/ and /ɣamu/ - 'we/us' and 'you'

===== Distinguished by level of stricture =====
/patu/ and /petu/ - 'stone' and 'mangrove'
/tina/ and /tini/ - 'thousand' and 'body'
/neka/ and /nika/ - 'slippery cabbage' and 'fire'
/kopi/ and /kupi/ - 'lake' and 'to pick'

=== Consonant inventory ===
Ughele has 18 consonants and no consonant clusters, unless produced during fast, informal speech.

==== Stops ====
Ughele contains bilabial, alveolar and velar stops. These are /b + p/, /d + t/ and /g + k/ respectively, as well as voiced and unvoiced pairs for all plosives. /ba/ and /pa/ /made/ and /mate/ ('four' and 'die/dead') /poga/ and /poka/ ('to make pudding/pudding' and 'nail') All voiced stops are pre-nasalised, however the degree of this varies between speakers. Pronunciation of this runs from barely audible nasalisation to almost fully nasalised segments. E.g. /b/ → /b̃/, /d/ → /d̃/, /g/ → /g̃/

- Nasal and oral pairs for all voiced stops e.g. /b/ → /m/, /d/ → /n/, /g/ → /ŋ/
- Voiced bilabial nasals and non-nasals e.g. /ma/ and /ba/, /na/ and /da/
- Voiced velar nasals and non-nasals e.g. /mamaŋa/ 'open' → /mamaga/ 'a fish species'
- Voiced bilabial, alveolar and velar stops e.g. /mabo/ 'tired' → /mado/ 'happy' → /mago/ 'spirit, devil'
- Unvoiced stops /ka/ (negation indicator), /pa/ (location phrase indicator), /ta/ (possession indicator)
- Voiced bilabial/alveolar/velar nasals e.g. /madi/ 'obey', /nadi/ 'sagopalm pudding', /ŋadi/ 'sharp, long'

==== Alveolar trill ====
There is only one found in Ughele; this is in the lexeme /arozo/ ('rope').

==== Fricatives ====
- Labiodental, alveolar, velar and glottal /v/, /s/, /z/, /ɣ/ and /h/
- Labiodental /v/ and velar /ɣ/ are voiced and → /ɣoi/ 'you' and /voi/ 'to put'
- Glottal fricatives are unvoiced /puha/ 'to wipe' and /pusa/ 'to tie'
- Voiced and unvoiced alveolars /soi/ 'hot drink' and /zoi/ 'penis'

==== The affricate d͡ʒ ====
This post-alveolar affricate is sometimes realised as a palatal nasal stop /ɲ/, although this is relatively rare in spoken language and therefore is speaker-dependent.

/d͡ʒ/ → /ɲ/ ~ /d͡ʒ/

Thus ngajiri ('angry') may be pronounced /ŋad͡ʒiri/ or /ŋapiri/.

==== Approximants ====
Ughele contains one alveolar lateral approximant /l/ and one labial velar /w/. However, /w/ only occurs in a small set of loanwords from English and Roviana (another Solomon Island language originally developed for trade).

'Window' – /wida/
'Week' – /wiki/
'Win' – /wini/
'Year' – vaseni /waseni/

==== Minimal pairs based on manner of articulation ====
- Voiced alveolar plosive /mada/ 'to let', and fricative, /maza/ 'flesh'
- Unvoiced alveolar plosive /tabu/ 'holy', and fricative /sabu/ 'hunt'
- Voiced velar plosive /gu/ '1st/p possessive', and fricative /ɣu/ 'just'

== Written language ==
Prior to the efforts of Frostad et al. Ughele had no documented history or written language standard. After these efforts Ughele is now written in Latin script as shown in these notes.

== Morphology ==
=== Pronouns and person marking ===
Ughele, like many other Oceanic languages, possesses a complex pronominal system that includes personal, relative and interrogative pronouns.

Personal pronouns

Personal pronouns predominate in terms of quantity; there are six types of pronoun forms: independent pronouns, preverbal subject partial clitics, postverbal subject pronouns, object clitics, preposed possessive pronouns and attributive suffixes. Personal pronouns are marked for number and clusivity. In each of these types, distinctions are made between singular and plural forms, as well as first, second, and third person. Inclusive and exclusive forms for first-person plural are separated; the inclusive form extends to include the addressee whereas the addressee is then excluded from the extension of the exclusive form. There are partial formal similarities, and in some cases a complete overlap of forms between the types. The table below is an overview of the various types of personal pronouns.

Ughele personal pronouns
| Person and number | Independent pronouns | Preverbal subject partial clitics | Postverbal subject pronouns | Object clitics | Preposed possessive pronouns | Attributive suffixes |
|---|---|---|---|---|---|---|
| 1 SG | rau | gu | gua | -(a)u | gua | -gu |
| 2 SG | ghoi | mu | mua | -(a)gho | mua | -mu |
| 3 SG | ia | na | nana | -a | nana | -na |
| 1 PL INCL | ghita | da | nada | -ghita | nada | -da |
| 1 PL EXCL | ghami | ma | mami | -ghami | mami | -mama |
| 2 PL | ghamu | mu | miu | -ghamu | miu | -miu |
| 3 PL | rie | di | dia | -ni | dia | -di |

Personal pronouns in Ughele can occupy various positions throughout the clause, with some types being more restricted in their use than others.

==== Independent pronouns ====
Independent pronouns may act as the head of a noun phrase, taking on the forms of subject, direct object, or indirect object as a complement to prepositions. They may also appear in possessive constructions.

(..) meke naghe rie ka ru, ghita ka ru kai tuterei kaloa polo (..)
{} and say PRO:3PL CARD two PRO:1PL.INCL CARD two NEG quick leave if {}
'(..) and the two said, we [two] won't leave quickly if (..)'

Above is an example of the third-person plural pronoun rie and first-person plural exclusive pronoun ghita in noun phrases headed by pronouns. The numeral modifier ka ru follows the pronoun head, whereas it would typically precede a noun head.

Ughele has object marking clitics and two different sets of subject markers, and these occur in specific fixed positions relative to the verb.

==== Object clitics ====
Object clitics are pronominal forms, which only occur with verb stems and only mark direct object.

Transitive verbs rarely occur without object marking clitics, and are either attached directly to the verb stem (2), or follow the transitive suffix, either –i (3) or –ni (4).

First-person singular exclusive object clitic –(a)u attached to verb stem

Beto paiza rau mai kaduvu na tina-gu meke mono-au meke (..)
finish there PRO:1SG come arrive COMM mother-ATTR:1SG and massage-OBJ:1SG and {}
'There I was (and) my mother came and massaged me and (..)'+

Third-person singular object clitic –a attached to transitive suffix –i

Tavet-i-a rie na boboro
make-TR-OBJ:3SG PRO:3PL COMM b.
'They made boboro.'

Third-person singular object clitic –a attached to transitive suffix –ni

Puzi-ni-a rie ka ru na ulu-na meke (..)
tie-TR-OBJ:3SG PRO:3PL CARD two COMM hair-ATTR:3SG and {}
'The two tied its hair and (..)'

Object clitics may be the only referent to the object in the clause (5) or they may occur with a coreferential noun phrase (6).

Second-person singular –(a)gho

Ei, kai en-ene legho ghoi leke lao kakea va-mate-gho ghua rie ngeta naghe lao
hey NEG REDUP-walk very PRO:2SG lest go some CAUS-die-PRO:2SG say PRO:3PL three speak go
'Hey, don't walk (around like that) lest someone will kill you, said the three.'

Second-person singular object clitic –(a)gho with coreferential noun phrase second-person singular independent pronoun –ghoi:

Polo lao rau baeri-gho ghoi si lao mama ta ghoi ngajiri-ni-gho ghoi
if go PRO:1SG befriend-OBJ:2SG PRO:2SG then go mother POSS PRO:2SG be.angry-TR-OBJ:2SG PRO:2SG
'If I go ahead and befriend you, your mother will become angry with you.'

==== Preverbal subject partial clitics ====
Preverbal subject marking pronouns in Ughele can appear in the form of partial clitics. These clitics precede the verb complex, but only in very specific constructions. They cliticize to two particles, the homophonous imperative mood marker ma (7), and conjunction ma 'then' (8), and they occur as independent forms indicating pivots in complex clauses (9). This aspect of Ughele's grammar bears resemblance to that of three of its nearest neighbouring languages, Hoava, Roviana and Marovo, with that of Marovo being the most similar.

First-person plural inclusive preverbal subject clitic –da attached to mood marker ma

Aria, ma=da va-mate-a na nini ghua rie ka ru.
hurry IMP=SBJ:1PL.INCL CAUS-die-OBJ:3SG COMM giant say PRO:3PL CARD two
'Hurry, let's kill the giant, said the two.'

Second-person singular preverbal subject clitic –mu attached to conjunction ma

Vato mai-ni-a mene na juke za beto ma=mu paleke mai-ni-a
light come-TR-OBJ:3SG first COMM lamp DEM:SG finish then=SBJ:2SG carry come-TR-OBJ:3SG
'Go and light the light first then bring it (up).'

Third-person plural preverbal subject independent form di

Vura ghighiri makazi mana daetonga di sena-i le di ghore pulese.
go.out very bonito but nothing SBJ:3PL get-OBJ:3PL so SBJ:3PL descend return
'There were plenty of bonito but they got nothing so they went back.'

==== Postverbal subject pronouns ====
In Ughele, postverbal subject pronouns overlap completely with preposed possessive pronouns. Postverbal subject pronouns mark various types of foci, where the pronouns would refer to the focused constituent. Below is an example of the third-person plural postverbal subject pronoun used in a sentence.

Ka made mazi pire hiva lao suve dia
CARD four sibling DEM:PL want go swim SBJ:3PL
'The four sisters wanted to go swimming.'

=== Demonstratives ===
Demonstrative particles are a grammatical function that indicate specific entities as well as addressing deixis. Demonstratives in Ughele are separated into three categories based on deictic distance and further identified as singular or plural. Within Ughele morphology, these particles appear after the head noun within the noun phrase, taking the final position. Ughele follows linguistic trends in Oceanic languages with regards to sentence construction with demonstratives. Within the language families of the Solomon Islands, there is a linguistic trend of separating definite articles and root nouns. The common word order throughout the languages of the Solomon Islands is noun-demonstrative, as noted in nearby Oceanic languages Hoava and Roviana. This trend is universal to the region.

Demonstrative particles
| Deictic Distance | Singular | Plural |
|---|---|---|
| Near | pi(la) | pire |
| Intermediate | za | zara |
| Distant | pioi(la) | piroi |

Included are the glosses for some noun phrases in Ughele to demonstrate the function of demonstratives. These glosses are translated to English below. The examples showcase the word order of Ughele noun phrases as well as the function of the distance particles when compared to English.

...meke ta-zalanga ikana pila.
and PASS-heal person DEM:SG
'...and this person was healed.'

na-havoro meava pioi dongo lea
COM-flower yellow DEM:PL look nice
'That yellow flower looks nice.'

==== Demonstratives functioning as interrogatives ====
Intermediate distance particles are often found to be used the least, with an implied distance, a common occurrence in Oceanic languages identified by Lynch, Ross and Crowley. As a result of this implied meaning, these particles can often take other grammatical functions. Frostad describes the common phoneme between the intermediate singular particle and the interrogative 'what' in Ughele, za. The following example is from Frostad's grammar of Ughele, demonstrating the aforementioned dual function.

kai ghilan-i-a rau vae na za selu pa za i-a
NEG know-TR-OBJ:3SG PRO:1SG be.like COM what follow LOC what PRO:3SG
'I don't know what he is following and where he is following it to.'

It is demonstrated in this example that za, when paired with other articles, endures a function adjustment. The article na signifies a noun and when paired with za, indicates an unknown noun, therefore becoming 'what' in the English translation. This is a similar process for pa, a morpheme signifying a locative function. When used in conjunction with za, it functions as a temporal interrogative. These are not the only forms of the interrogatives [what] and [where]; there are grammatical words that occupy the same meaning in interrogative clauses.

=== Interrogatives ===
In order to construct an interrogative clause, without pretext; there are a series of grammatical function words with corresponding meanings given below. Additionally, there are other means to construct an interrogative clause in Ughele, the function of this is context dependent, relying on situational anaphora. Ughele generally follows the linguistic trends relating to interrogative clause construction for the region, confirmed by the nature of Roviana and Hoava to exclusively use intonation as a question marker. However, Ughele also occasionally uses a question particle in interrogative construction; the conditions for this are outlined below.

| English | Ughele |
|---|---|
| what | za |
| where | vei |
| who | zei |
| when | kamuza |
| why | zale |
| how many | viviza |
| how | viza |

==== Question particle ====
In Ughele, there is a single question particle, a-. This marker has a purely grammatical function denoting the sentence as a question. It is usually paired with one of the above interrogatives. This marker is not used exclusively; rather, it is a marker denoting conversational foci used in specific sentence types outlined below.

==== Simple interrogatives ====
A locative interrogative clause in Ughele generally follows the pattern: NP [pa] [vei], fronted by the noun phrase, then using the preposition locative pa. This kind of question is used within brief exchanges, attempting to gain new knowledge quickly.

Ghoi pa vei
PRO:2SG LOC where
'Where are you?'

==== Context-dependent interrogatives ====
Without a preposition, vei gains the affix a-, becoming avei and it appears before the noun phrase: avei NP. This occurs when the question is influenced by pragmatic focus, a newly understood meaning based on what a speaker has informed a hearer. This kind of sentence would be used during an extended conversation either as a response or a concurrent idea, in contrast to the former as a simple interrogative or a conversation starter.

Meke nanaza lao ia, a-vei na ghaili
and ask go PRO:3SG, FOC:where COM fishhook
'And he asked; where is the fishhook?'

As evidenced above, there is a clear connection between demonstratives in Ughele and the morphology of interrogatives, signified by the common phonology of 'what' and 3SG as za. This is exclusive to the anaphoric pretext of the conversation. Therefore, na-za ('what') is a reference to a specific question from conversational context. This applies to pa-za ('where') too.

=== Articles ===
There are three articles occurring with nouns in Ughele, each used in different contexts. They all precede the noun that they occur with.

The first is e, the personal article:

(..) meke naghe [e Peni]_{NP}, (..)
{} and say PERS Peni {}
'(..) and Peni said, (..)'

Next is the focal article, ai (17).

Ko nana kaike ikana bagho-na ia [ai Noman Wheatley]_{NP}.
be SBJ:3SG one person name-POSS:3SG PRO:3SG FOC:ART Norman Wheatley
'There was a man by the name of Norman Wheatley.'

And finally na, the common article (18).

A-ia [na sasanana]_{NP} vizoroi.
FOC-PRO:3SG ART habit before
'That was the habit before.'

=== Negation ===
Ughele uses three negation particles: kai, dapu, and kati. Kai is the most frequently used and it negates the verbal predicate that follows it. Dapu negates modal verbs and verbs indicating irrealis mood. There is an irrealis mood marker, site, and when it is present, it precedes dapu. If not, dapu is sometimes the only evidence of irrealis mood marking in a phrase. The third particle, Kati, is used to negate nominal predicates.

== Possessive constructions ==
Possession in Ughele, as in many Oceanic languages, can be sorted into two types of construction, direct and indirect. Direct possessive constructions involve a prenominal attributive suffix, while the indirect possessive constructions distinguished between three further types, two which express possession through prepositional phrases, one with the preposition ta, the other with the preposition taga. The third indirect possessive construction uses a possessive pronoun which modifies the possessum noun. Ughele also distinguishes alienable possession from inalienable possession, and this influences to varying degrees which construction will be used. However, inalienable and alienable possession distinction is not a so much a binary construction but rather a spectrum, which demonstrates tendencies for different relationships between possessor and possessum to take certain possessive constructions.

Use of possessive construction in relation to semantic meaning.
| | Direct POSS constr. | ta PP POSS constr. | taga PP POSS constr. | Possessive pronoun |
|---|---|---|---|---|
| Body parts | X | X | (X) | |
| Bodily products | X | | | |
| Other body related items | X | X | | |
| Parts of a whole | X | | | |
| Kinship terms | X | X | (X) | |
| Spatial relations | X | | | |
| Unowned possession | X | X | | (X) |
| Actions carried out | | X | (X) | |
| Actions undergone | | | (X) | |
| Ownership | | | X | X |

=== Direct possessive construction ===
The direct possessive construction in Ughele is similar to many Oceanic languages and identical to Proto-Oceanic's direct possessive construction. It involves an attributive suffix which occurs prenominally on the possessum noun; this indexes number and person of the possessor as in (19).

Gharo-a mudi-gu!
scratch-OBJ:3SG back-ATTR:SG
'Scratch my back!'

Generally, intrinsically inalienable possession takes the indirect possessive construction – that is, things which the possessor has no real control of their possession over, such as body parts or kinship terms. Direct possessive constructions are used in Ughele mainly for intrinsically inalienable possessive relationships such as the body and its parts, as well as certain kinship terms. Less inherently inalienable possessive relationships may also tend towards a direct possessive construction with entities being referent possessum nouns within the construction when they are a part of a larger whole. However, the relationship between lexical items and possessive constructions is by no means stringent. The indirect prepositional constructions, both ta and taga, although more readily ta, may also be used for the same noun, even when there is no semantic difference.

Attributive suffixes are what are often labeled as possessive suffixes in most other Oceanic languages, but in Ughele, they also have other functions. In direct possessive constructions, attributive suffixes may either agree with the possessor noun (20) or be the only expression of the possessor (21).

Zighiti ghighiri mata-gu rau pire
hurt very eye-ATTR:1SG PRO:1SG DEM:PL
'My eyes hurt really bad (lit. 'these eyes of mine hurt really bad.')

Ghorehe bagho-na tingitonga
Ghorehe name-ATTR:3SG thing
'Ghorehe is the name of the thing.'

Attributive suffixes are also used to derive nominal attributive modifiers from adjectival verbs, indicating the number and person of the referent of the head noun (23).

A-ia kaike vivinei panoghoto-na.
FOC-PRO:3SG one story short-ATTR:3SG
'That was a short story.'

==== Possessive constructions using prepositions ta and taga ====
Two of the three indirect possessive constructions in Ughele use the prepositions ta or taga. The structure of the construction is identical for either preposition which is used in a prepositional phrase which follows the possessum noun, as in (24) and (25). Within the PP is the preposition, either ta or taga, followed by the possessor noun expressed in a noun phrase. While not as commonly as the direct possessive construction, ta and taga can be used for intrinsically unalienable possession such as body parts, as in (24). Indirect possessive constructions using ta are the most frequently used in Frostad's 2012 corpus, being fairly versatile and widely spread across situations. Both ta and taga can be used for kinship terms, inalienable body parts, unowned possessions such as names, as well as for actions carried out by the referent of the possessor noun.

Kololuka na vivinei ta ghita pa Ughele.
Kololuka COMM story POSS PRO:1PL.INCL LOC Ughele
'Kololuka is the story of us in Ughele.'

A-ia ghu na vivinei site taga rau.
FOC-PRO:1SG EMPH COMM story little POSS PRO:1SG
'That was my little story.'

==== Possessive constructions using a possessive pronoun ====
Preposed possessive pronouns which modify a possessum noun make up one of the three indirect possessive marking strategies in Ughele. The possessor may or may not be expressed in a noun phrase.

Ghila-ni-a rau mua rineka ghoi.
know-TR-OBJ:3SG PRO:1SG POSS:2SG language PRO:2SG
'I understand your language (Lit. I know your language.)'

Leana ghighiri ko na mua v<in>aritokai ko (..)
thank very DIR COMM POSS:2SG <NOM>DISTR-help DIR {}
'Thank (you) very much for your collaboration with (..)'

The previous two examples illustrates the flexibility in the possessive pronoun construction when expressing a possessor noun. In (26) the possessor is expressed in a noun phrase, specifically the second-person singular pronoun ghoi, while (27) does not express a possessor at all.

All other forms of possessive pronouns are compiled in the table below.

Possessor pronouns
| | SG | PL |
|---|---|---|
| 1 INCL | | nada |
| 1 EXCL | gua | mami |
| 2 . | mua | miu |
| 3 | nana | dia |
