= KZK =

KZK or kzk may refer to

- Air Kazakhstan (ICAO airline code KZK)
- Kazhakuttam railway station (station code KZK), Trivandrum, Kerala, India
- Kazukuru language (ISO 639 code kzk)
- Kazakovite (mineral symbol Kzk), see List of mineral symbols
- Kasautii Zindagii Kay (2001 TV series), an Indian soap opera
- Kasautii Zindagii Kay (2018 TV series), reboot of the 2001 series
