= Blanga =

Blanga may refer to:

- Blanga language, an Austronesian language of the Solomon Islands
- Blanga (pottery), a type of earthenware used in island Southeast Asia
