= Laghu language =

Extinct Austronesian language in the Solomon Islands

Laghu
- Region: Santa Isabel Island
- Extinct: 1984
- Language family: Austronesian: Malayo-Polynesian; Oceanic; Northwest Solomonic; New Georgia – Ysabel; Ysabel; West Isabel; Laghu

Language codes
- ISO 639-3: lgb
- Glottolog: lagh1246
- ELP: Laghu
- Laghu is classified as Extinct by the UNESCO Atlas of the World's Languages in Danger.

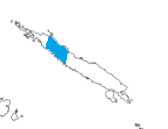
Laghu language

Laghu (pronounced [laɡu]), also known as Hoatana or Katova, is an extinct language of Santa Isabel in the Solomon Islands. Its last speaker died in 1984. People in the villages of Baolo and Samasodu, where it used to be spoken, now speak the neighboring Zabana language, which is more widely spoken and still expanding (Palmer 2009:1-2).
