= Mono language =

There are several languages called Mono:

- Mono language (California), an endangered Native American language of the California River basin in the United States
- Mono language (Cameroon), an Adamawa language
- Mono language (Congo), a Ubangian language spoken by 65,000 people in the Democratic Republic of Congo
- Mono language (Solomon Islands), an Austronesian language spoken on the Solomon Islands by fewer than 4,000 people
