= Uge =

Uge or UGE may refer to:

- Uge Station, a railway station in Japan
- Uge language, of Nigeria
- Ughele language (ISO 639:uge), of the Solomon Islands
- UGE International, a renewable energy company
- Univa Grid Engine, a batch-queuing system
