= MVO =

MVO may refer to:

- Member of the Royal Victorian Order, a British order of knighthood (post-nominal letters: MVO)
- Montserrat Volcano Observatory, an observatory on the Caribbean island of Montserrat
- Marovo language
- MVO is a code of Manwath Road, a railway station in Maharashtra state of India
