= Varisi language =

Austronesian language spoken in the Solomon Islands

Varisi
- Native to: Solomon Islands
- Native speakers: (5,200 cited 1999)
- Language family: Austronesian: Malayo-Polynesian; Oceanic; Western; Meso-Melanesian; Northwest Solomonic; Choiseul; Varisi

Language codes
- ISO 639-3: vrs
- Glottolog: vari1239

Varisi is an indigenous language of Choiseul Province, Solomon Islands.
