= Marovo Island =

Island in Solomon Islands

Coordinates: 8°30′S 158°00′E

Marovo Island is an island in Western Province, Solomon Islands, located in the central of Marovo Lagoon, north of Vangunu Island. Marovo was the island where Australian sailor and author John Cromar mostly operated in his later years.

== See also ==
- Western Province topics
