= Vaghua language =

Austronesian language spoken in the Solomon Islands

Vaghua
- Tavula
- Native to: Solomon Islands
- Native speakers: (2,000 cited 1999)
- Language family: Austronesian: Malayo-Polynesian; Oceanic; Western; Meso-Melanesian; Northwest Solomonic; Choiseul; Vaghua

Language codes
- ISO 639-3: tva
- Glottolog: vagh1249

Vaghua (Vagua), or Tavula, is an indigenous language of Choiseul Province, Solomon Islands.
