= Babatana language =

Austronesian language spoken in the Solomon Islands

Babatana
- East Choiseul
- Native to: Solomon Islands
- Native speakers: (7,100 cited 1999)
- Language family: Austronesian: Malayo-Polynesian; Oceanic; Western; Meso-Melanesian; Northwest Solomonic; Choiseul; Babatana
- Dialects: Sisingga (Sisiqa)

Language codes
- ISO 639-3: baa
- Glottolog: sout3208

Babatana, also spelled Mbambatana, is the principal indigenous language of Choiseul Province, Solomon Islands. Although native to the South Choiseul coastline area between Sepa and the Manggo Bay area, the use of this language has spread across much of Choiseul Island and it is generally understood, much like Solomon Islands Pijin, across the province as a second or third language.

== Phonology ==
The following represents the Sisiqa dialect:

=== Consonants ===
		Bilabial	Alveolar	Post- alveolar	Velar
Plosive	voiceless	p	t		k
Plosive	voiced	b	d	dʒ	ɡ
Fricative	voiceless		s		
Fricative	voiced	β	z		ɣ
Nasal		m	n		ŋ
Trill			r		
Lateral			l		

- Voiced stops are typically plainly released word-initially, but prenasalized [ᵐb ⁿd ᵑɡ] when intervocalically.
- The fricative /z/ can be heard as an affricate [dz] in free variation within word-initial position.

=== Vowels ===
	Front	Central	Back
Close	i	ə	u
Mid	e	ə	o
Open		a	

- The central vowel /ə/ can vary between three sounds [ə], [ɨ] and [ø].

== Simple expressions ==
- 'Good morning': Marisasa nöe
- 'Good afternoon': Kinaka nöe
- 'Good evening': Vilu nöe
- 'Good night': Kuse nöe
- 'Let's go fishing': Me mata la pepeko
- 'How much': Ava via
- 'Many': Taba
- 'No worries': Manöe zirapeta
- 'I'm hungry': Ra ko saqo
- 'I'm full': Ra ko kuma
- 'Don't eat it': Kasi göki tini
- 'I'd like to swim': Ra ko sökö ma senge
- 'I'd like to dive': Ra ko sökö ma kujulu
- 'I'm going to sleep': Ra ma la pamu
- 'Come here': Zo me gati
- 'Go away': Zo
- 'Bring ... here': vame gati...
- 'Take ... away': Qisu la ...
- 'Leave it': Törö
- 'I like ...': Ra ko sökö ...
- 'I see ...': Kori ...
- 'I don't see ...': Kamariqu ...
- 'It's too hot': Sa vila varuka
- 'The sun is too hot': Kiku sa vila varuka
- 'Where are you going?': Bimolae?
- 'Bad boy': So roka (usually said in jest with suitable tone)

== Commands/verbs ==
- 'Go': Zola
- 'Come': Zome
- 'Quick': Dada
- 'Slow': Kurki
- 'Easy': Samao
- 'Run': Jekele
- 'Wait': Piri
- 'Jump': Soqa
- 'Out': Jolo
- 'Shout': Vukulu
- 'Tell him': Pijoni

== Numbers ==
- 1. Köke
- 2. Kere
- 3. Tulu
- 4. Vati
- 5. Lima
- 6. Vonomo
- 7. Vitu
- 8. Viu
- 9. Zia
- 10. Mano
- 20. Karabete
- 30. Tolo Ngonu
- 40. Kereduki
- 50. Neqo
- 60. Neqo mano
- 70. Neqo karabete
- 80. Neqo tulungunu
- 90. Neqo kereduki
- 100. Köke vubi
- 1000. Köke Mau

== Other vocabulary ==
- 'Food': Gaki
- 'Garden': Baroe
- 'Cassava': Tovioko
- 'Pineapple': Kanapu
- 'Sweet potato': Sisu
- 'Taro': Tika
- 'Yam': Noba
- 'Pumpkin': Duru
- 'Corn': Lezu
- 'Banana': Siku
- 'Ripe': Musu
- 'Betelnut': Kasu
- 'Sour/bitter': Paza
- 'It smells': Sanabu
- 'Bad smell': Nabusasa
- 'Fish': Koete
- 'Shark': Bursa
- 'Bonito': Reka
- 'Crocodile': Poku
- 'Kingfish': Tangere
- 'Barracuda': Ghalu
- 'Marlin': Viruviru
- 'Fishing line': Tali
- 'Hook': Jopa pipiko
- 'Bait': Mamutu
- 'Reef': Pedaka
- 'Dive': Kojulu
- 'Coral': Laji
- 'Sea cucumber': Bu
- 'Clam shell': Meka
- 'Shell': Banga
- 'River': Vuru
- 'Rain': Murga
- 'Wind': Vovosele
- 'Cyclone': Sokoro
- 'Sea': Masi
- 'Fresh water': Bi
- 'Island': Nunu
- 'Mountain': Supu
- 'Sand beach': Korokone
- 'Sky': Mamalurkana
- 'Cloud': Toki
- 'Sun': Ngada
- 'Star': Siriputu
- 'Moon': Ukene
- 'Canoe': Mola
- 'Paddle': Kapo
- 'House': Toke/pande
- 'Ladder': Tokatoka
- 'Kitchen': Pande kuki
- 'Cooking pot': Sireke
- 'Door': Patagamana
- 'Window': Vuida
- 'Sleep': Pam
- 'Mosquito': Zizima

== Customary terms ==
- 'Creep': Gara

== Colourful words ==
- 'Masturbation': Sovisovi
- 'Excrement': Te
- 'Vagina': Kede
- 'Penis': Veje
- 'Anus': Kodolo
- 'Mucus': Momo
