= Ratsua language =

Austronesian language of Bougainville, PNG

Ratsua
- Native to: Papua New Guinea
- Region: Bougainville
- Native speakers: ca. 200
- Language family: Austronesian: Malayo-Polynesian; Oceanic; Western; Meso-Melanesian; Northwest Solomonic; Nehan–Bougainville; Saposa–Tinputz; Ratsua

Language codes
- ISO 639-3: None (mis)
- Glottolog: None
- ELP: Ratsua; Ratsua

Ratsua is an Austronesian language of Bougainville, Papua New Guinea.
