= Teop language =

Oceanic language spoken on Bougainville

Teop
- Native to: Papua New Guinea
- Region: Bougainville
- Native speakers: (5,000 cited 1991)
- Language family: Austronesian: Malayo-Polynesian; Oceanic; Western; Meso-Melanesian; Northwest Solomonic; Nehan–Bougainville; Saposa–Tinputz; Teop

Language codes
- ISO 639-3: tio
- Glottolog: teop1238
- ELP: Teop

Teop is a language of northern Bougainville, Papua New Guinea. It falls within the Oceanic languages, a subgrouping of the Austronesian language family. According to Malcolm Ross, Teop belongs to the Nehan-Bougainville family of languages, part of the Northwest Solomonic group of the Meso-Melanesian cluster within the Oceanic languages. Its closest relative is Saposa.
