= Gao language =

Austronesian language spoken in the Solomon Islands

Gao
- Nggao
- Native to: Central Solomon Islands
- Region: Santa Isabel Island
- Native speakers: (1,200 cited 1999)
- Language family: Austronesian: Malayo-Polynesian; Oceanic; Northwest Solomonic; New Georgia – Ysabel; Ysabel; East Isabel; Gao

Language codes
- ISO 639-3: gga
- Glottolog: gaoo1237
- ELP: Gao
- Gao is classified as Vulnerable by the UNESCO Atlas of the World's Languages in Danger

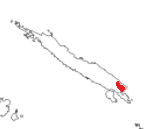
Extension of Gao language on Santa Isabel

Gao (also called Nggao) is an endangered Oceanic language spoken in the Solomon Islands. Its speakers live on Santa Isabel Island.
