= Ririo language =

Austronesian language spoken in the Solomon Islands

Ririo
- Native to: Solomon Islands
- Native speakers: 18 (2007)
- Language family: Austronesian: Malayo-Polynesian; Oceanic; Western; Meso-Melanesian; Northwest Solomonic; Choiseul; Ririo

Language codes
- ISO 639-3: rri
- Glottolog: riri1237
- ELP: Ririo
- Ririo is classified as Critically Endangered by the UNESCO Atlas of the World's Languages in Danger.

Ririo is a nearly extinct indigenous language of Choiseul Province, Solomon Islands.

== Phonology ==
=== Consonants ===
Ririo has 18 consonant phonemes.

Ririo consonant phonemes
		Labial	Alveolar	Velar	Glottal
Nasal		m	n	ŋ	
Stop	voiceless	p	t	k	ʔ
Stop	prenasalized	ᵐb	ⁿd	ᵑg	
Affricate	voiceless		ts		
Affricate	prenasalized		ⁿdz		
Fricative		v (Note: /β/ is considered to be an allophone.)	s, z	ɣ	
Approximant			l		
Trill			r		

=== Vowels ===
Ririo has 9 vowel phonemes.

Ririo vowel phonemes
	Front	Back
Close	i	u
Close-mid	e, ø	o
Open-mid	ɛ, œ	ɔ
Open	a	
