= Lungga language =

Austronesian language spoken in the Solomon Islands

Lungga
- Region: Solomon Islands
- Native speakers: (2,800 cited 1999)
- Language family: Austronesian: Malayo-Polynesian; Oceanic; Northwest Solomonic; New Georgia – Ysabel; New Georgia; Lungga

Language codes
- ISO 639-3: lga
- Glottolog: lung1249

Lungga (also spelled Luga, Luqa) is a Malayo-Polynesian language spoken by about 2,800 people on the southern half of Ranongga Island, Solomon Islands.
