= Papapana language =

Oceanic language spoken on Bougainville

Papapana
- Native to: Papua New Guinea
- Region: Bougainville
- Native speakers: (120 cited 2000)
- Language family: Austronesian: Malayo-Polynesian; Oceanic; Western; Meso-Melanesian; Northwest Solomonic; Nehan–Bougainville; Papapana

Language codes
- ISO 639-3: ppn
- Glottolog: papa1265
- ELP: Papapana
- Papapana is classified as Definitely Endangered by the UNESCO Atlas of the World's Languages in Danger.

Papapana is an Austronesian language of Bougainville, Papua New Guinea.
