= Arthur Maurice Hocart =

Belgian-born British anthropologist (1883–1939)

Arthur Maurice Hocart (26 April 1883, in Etterbeek, Belgium – 9 March 1939, in Cairo, Egypt) was an anthropologist best known for his eccentric and often far-seeing works on Polynesia, Melanesia, and Sri Lanka.

== Early life ==
Hocart's family had resided for several hundred years in Guernsey (one of the Channel Islands between France and England) but are traceable to Domrémy-la-Pucelle, birthplace of Joan of Arc. Both his father, James and grandfather, also James, were Protestant missionaries in Switzerland, France and Belgium. Although Arthur was born in Etterbeek, near Brussels, he maintained his British nationality, as did the rest of his family. This juxtaposition between the English and Francophone worlds captures not only Hocart's education, but his status as an outsider to British academia. His work often seemed to predict developments in French anthropology, such as structuralism.

== From England to the South Seas ==
After attending school at Elizabeth College, Guernsey, Hocart matriculated at Exeter College, Oxford in 1902. He graduated with honors in "Greats", a degree combining Latin, Greek, ancient history, and philosophy. After his graduation in 1906 he spent two years studying psychology and phenomenology at the University of Berlin. With this broad and idiosyncratic training in hand, he was picked by W.H.R. Rivers to accompany him on the Percy Sladen Trust Expedition to the Solomon Islands in 1908. Their ethnographic work on 'Eddystone Island' (today known by its local name of Simbo) and in nearby Roviana, stands as one of the first modern anthropological field projects, and was the inspiration behind sections of Pat Barker's novel The Ghost Road. Some of the data from the expedition appeared in Rivers' History of Melanesian Society in 1914, but most of their work did not make it into print until 1922, when Hocart began to publish a series of articles describing the core material. Immediately after his fieldwork in the Solomon Islands, Hocart travelled further east to Fiji, where he became the headmaster of Lau Provincial School, on the island of Lakeba in the Lau archipelago. At the same time, he maintained a research affiliation with Oxford and traveled widely through western Polynesia, conducting research in Fiji, Rotuma, Wallis Island, Samoa, and Tonga. The result was roughly six years of ethnographic fieldwork that formed the basis for Hocart's reputation today as one of the most important early ethnographers of Oceania.

== A military man in Ceylon ==
In 1914 Hocart returned to Oxford to pursue postgraduate studies in anthropology, a position that also included some teaching. However, World War I interrupted his progress and he spent the next four years in France, in army intelligence. In 1919 he mustered out of the army having reached the rank of captain. Hocart then began what was to be a long exile from British academia to a series of posts in the British Empire. After a year-long study of Sanskrit, Tamil, Pāli, and Sinhalese he moved to Ceylon (now Sri Lanka) to become the Archaeological Commissioner of Ceylon, where he oversaw the excavation and preservation of monumental architecture and other archaeological sites. With experience of the ancient Mediterranean, Polynesia and Melanesia, and South Asia now under his belt Hocart began publishing widely comparative studies on many topics, including that of Kingship. In 1925 Hocart suffered a bout of severe dysentery and returned to England to recover. By the late 1920s his poor health and politics within the colonial bureaucracy made Ceylon seem a poorer and poorer choice for him. He once again attempted (and failed) to obtain a position at Cambridge before finally retiring to England in 1929 on a pension.

== London to Cairo ==
Beginning in 1931 Hocart served for three years as an Honorary Lecturer in Ethnology at University College London which allowed him to give classes occasionally. He applied to Cambridge once more – this time for the chair in social anthropology – but was again unsuccessful. In 1934 he moved to Cairo where he served as the Professor of Sociology, the only academic position he held in his life. Poor health dogged him and he died in 1939 after contracting an infection in the course of research in Egypt.

== A career admired ==
Hocart's professional career took place at a time when British anthropologists were moving from an emphasis on diffusion and historical reconstruction to a more 'scientific' form of functionalism. Hocart's broad training and willingness to explore a wide variety of approaches produced work that was often poorly received by colleagues who repudiated past work in order to legitimize anthropology as a hard science. Interest in his work was revived in the 1960s when authors such as Lord Raglan, Rodney Needham, and Louis Dumont returned to Hocart's work as a source of theoretical inspiration. Today he is remembered for his ethnography of the Pacific and as an author whose work presaged the advent of structuralism.

== Works ==
- "The Cult of the Sead in Eddystone of the Solomons", Journal of the Royal Anthropological Institute of Great Britain and Ireland, 52; 71–117, 259–305. (1922)
- "The Origin of Monotheism", Folklore, Vol. 33, No. 3 (30 September 1922), pp. 282–293
- Memoirs of the Archaeological Survey of Ceylon (1924–36) editor with S. Paranavitana
- Kingship (London: Oxford University Press, 1927)
- The Progress of Man: A Short Survey of His Evolution, His Customs, and His Works (London: Methuen & Co., 1933)
- Kings and Councillors: An Essay in the Comparative Anatomy of Human Society (Cairo: Printing Office Paul Barbey, 1936; series: Egyptian University: Collection of Works Published by the Faculty of Arts)
- Les castes (Paris: Paul Geuthner, 1938; series: Ministère de l'Education nationale: Annales du Musée Guimet: Bibliothèque de vulgarisation), preface by Marcel Mauss
- Caste: A Comparative Study (London: Methuen & Co., 1950; reprinted by Taylor & Francis in Routledge Revivals series, 2018)
- The Life-giving Myth and Other Essays (Methuen & Co., 1952), edited with an introduction by Lord Raglan
- The Northern States of Fiji (London: Royal Anthropological Institute of Great Britain and Ireland, 1952)
- Social Origins (London: Watts, 1954)
- Le Mythe Sorcier et autres essais (1962; 2nd ed.: Paris: Payot, 1973, series: Petite bibliothèque Payot, 220)
- Imagination and Proof: Selected Essays of A. M. Hocart (Tucson, AZ: University of Arizona Press, 1987), editor: Rodney Needham
