= Tetepare Island =

Island in Western Province, Solomon Islands

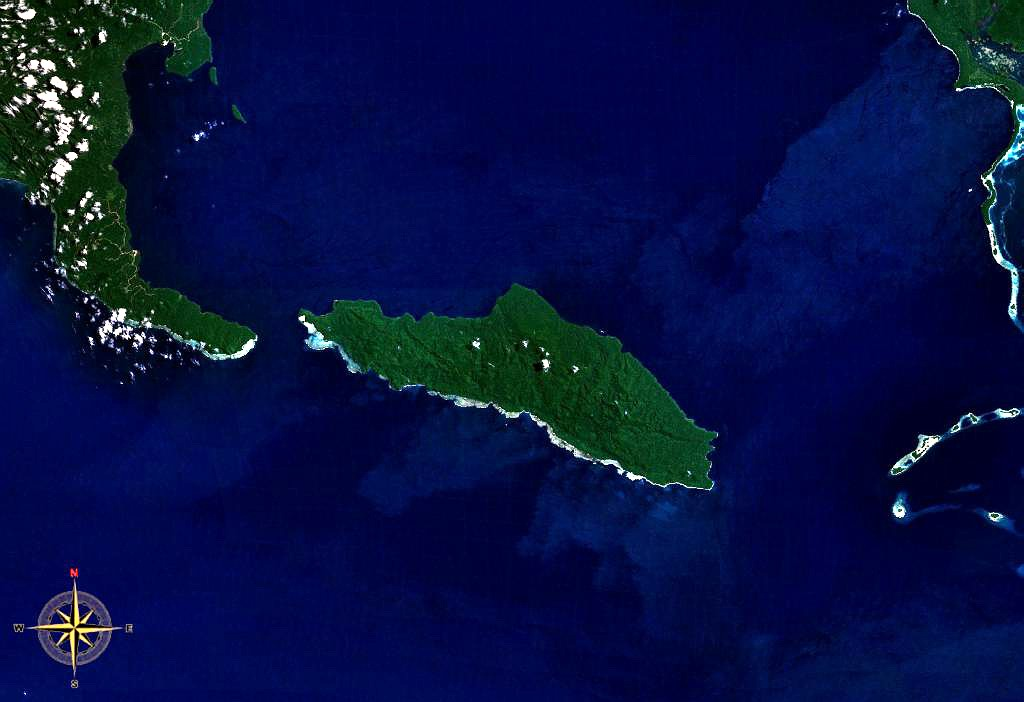
- Tetepare Island seen from space. Southern portion of Rendova Island can be seen in the west.
- Interactive map of Tetepare Island

Geography
- Location: Solomon Islands
- Coordinates: 8°43′00″S 157°33′00″E
- Archipelago: New Georgia Islands
- Area: 118 km^{2} (46 sq mi)

Demographics
- Population: 0

Tetepare Island is an island in Western Province, in the independent nation of Solomon Islands. Tetepare supports pristine lowland rainforest and a rich inshore marine area. Tetepare Island is identified as an area with high biodiversity and conservation values.

The meaning of the name is uncertain; it most probably means "wild pig" or "fighting boar" because the island was (and to some degree still is) famous for these animals among inhabitants of the region.

The local residents were apparently once a distinct ethnic group; a Tetepare language and unique traditions are attested, but information is fragmentary. Like their neighbors on Rendova Island and New Georgia, they appear to have been swidden agriculturalist, and to have occasionally practiced headhunting. But the island was abandoned in the mid-19th century, with the locals dispersing to New Georgia, Roviana Lagoon, Vona Vona Lagoon, Nggatokae and Ranongga.

At the western tip, a 3.75-square-kilometre (1.45-square-mile) coconut plantation was established in 1907–1918, but this declined since World War II and all maintenance ceased after 1990. Secondary forest is now reclaiming this area.

== Ecology ==
The island has been recognized for its conservation significance and archaeological values. A total of 230 bird species, 24 reptile, four frog and 13 mammal species have been recorded on Tetepare including rare and endemic bird and bat species.

Scientists are still discovering new species on Tetepare. In recent years, researchers discovered three new species of fish, one new fish genera and one potential new fish family in Tetepare's freshwater rivers.

Three species of marine turtles, including the critically endangered leatherback and hawksbill and the endangered green, nest on Tetepare's volcanic black sand beaches. Sharks, dolphins, crocodiles and an extraordinary diversity of fish species make the island's reefs their home. The coral reefs of the region support one of the highest diversities of fish and coral in the world, second only to Raja Ampat in Indonesia.

The island sports a rich herpetofauna, but geckos are somewhat less diverse. It supports three species of sea turtles, namely green sea turtle, leatherback sea turtle, and hawksbill sea turtle. The latter two are considered critically endangered species, and the former two are known to nest on Tetepare. The Solomon Islands skink which occurs here is the largest living skink. The mangrove monitor and the pacific ground boa are also not rare here; these three scleroglossan reptiles are becoming rare in the Solomon Islands. The highly unusual green green-blooded skink can be seen on the beaches.

In late 2004, entomologist Charles DeRoller conducted the first survey of the lepidoptera occurring on Tetepare. The range of 43 previously identified lepidoptera was expanded to include Tetepare. Most butterfly species on Tetepare are common to the New Georgia and/or Shortlands groups of islands. However, a new subspecies of butterfly, Argyronmpha rubianensis masolo, was described. The birdwing butterfly (Ornithoptera victoriae) was for the first time confirmed to exist on Tetepare, though the dead specimen was in such a state of decay that the specific subspecies could not be determined.

Birds are also plentiful, despite the presence of cats. Possibly the pigs and maybe the cats have extirpated certain ground birds, as indicated by the paucity of Gallicolumba doves and rails. The majestic Sanford's sea-eagle is plentiful, and among rarer birds, the beach thick-knee, crested cuckoo-dove and Kolombangara monarch are found. Nicobar pigeons and island imperial-pigeons use Tetepare as a foraging ground, crossing over from their roosts in neighboring mangrove swamps in huge numbers. The only known endemic taxon on Tetepare is the plentiful Tetepare white-eye (Zosterops tetiparius tetiparius), a subspecies of the dark-eyed white-eye.

Most mammals on Tetepare are bats. Among these is Fardoulis' blossom-bat (only described in 1993) and a roundleaf bat that might be Maggie Taylor's roundleaf bat (described in 1981) or a new taxon. In addition, some flying foxes from Tetepare are hitherto unidentified; possibly the New Georgia monkey-faced bat (Pteralopex taki) is one of them.

The island supports a population of wild pigs, which are an important food resource for people from neighboring Rendova Island, particularly during feasts. Local hunters help to regulate the pig population through frequent hunting trips to the island. At least one feral cat is known to exist on the island, but other invasive species like the cane toad have not reached the island.

Land "ownership" among the Tetepare people was of a customary caretaker nature. Their descendants are still recognized as the traditional landowners or overseers of Tetepare Island, and the island continues to be a place of spiritual and traditional significance in the region. In 2002 the Tetepare Descendants' Association was founded to coordinate the maintenance of the equilibrium between the island ecosystem and the exploitation of its resources by the growing human population of the Western Province, as well as the preservation of Tetepare as the home of their ancestors. A low-tech field station and ecolodge for ecotourism has been built.

== Tetepare Descendants' Association ==
In 1995 Friends of Tetepare was formed from a group of customary landowners to prevent commercial logging on the island. In 2002, the Friends of Tetepare and TOLOA (Tetepare Traditional Landowners Association) came together to form the Tetepare Descendants' Association (TDA). Their aim was to conserve Tetepare for the benefit of all descendants and future generations. More than 3000 descendants have since joined the TDA, making it one of the largest land-owning organisations in the Solomon Islands.

The TDA is a registered Solomon Islands charitable organisation, with an office in the town of Munda, and a field station and ecolodge on Tetepare Island.

The TDA has established a 13-kilometre-long (8-mile) Marine Protected Area on Tetepare, which is a no-take zone. This is one of the largest contiguous Marine Protected Areas in the Solomon Islands. TDA rangers, marine monitors, seagrass monitors and turtle monitors work on the island to patrol and protect the MPA and the forest, and to monitor the health of the island's reefs, seagrass meadows and forests, and to tag turtles and protect and relocate turtle nests during the nesting season from September to April.

With funding and support from the European Union, the TDA has created an ecolodge on Tetepare, which provides jobs for descendants from local villages and raises money to support the conservation program.

The TDA also runs sustainable livelihoods programs for descendant communities and runs a scholarship program to help TDA members pay school fees for their children.

The TDA has received support and funding from several international organisations and individuals including the European Union, World Wide Fund for Nature, Conservation International, Australian Volunteers International and NZ Aid.

== See also ==
- Desert island
- List of islands
