= Rendova Island =

Island in Solomon Islands

Rendova
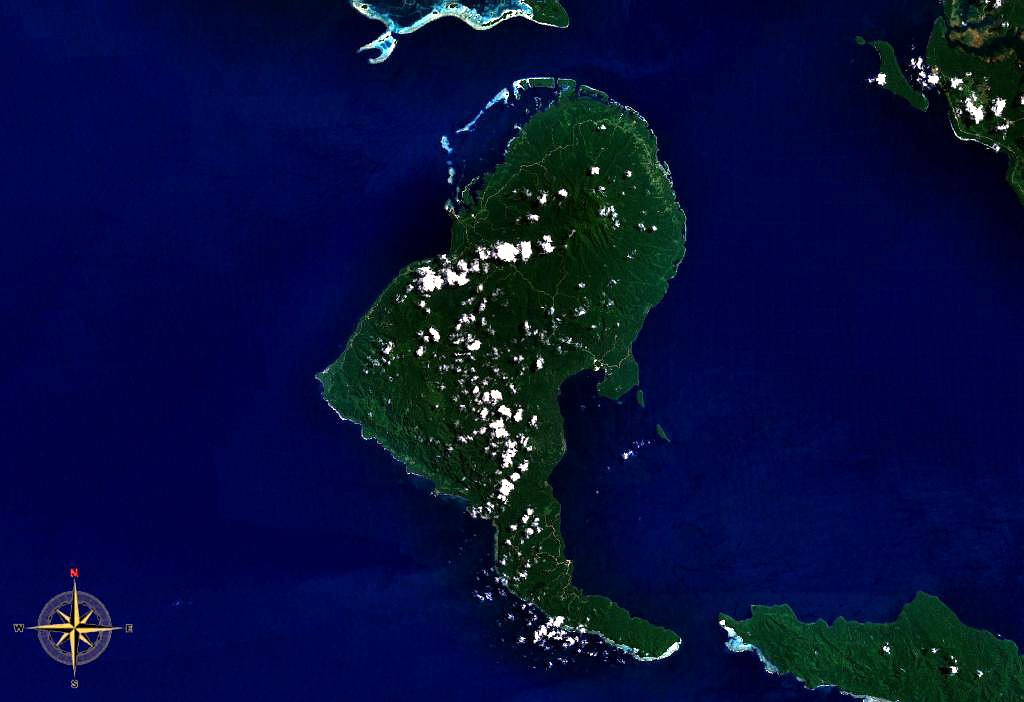
- NASA image of Rendova

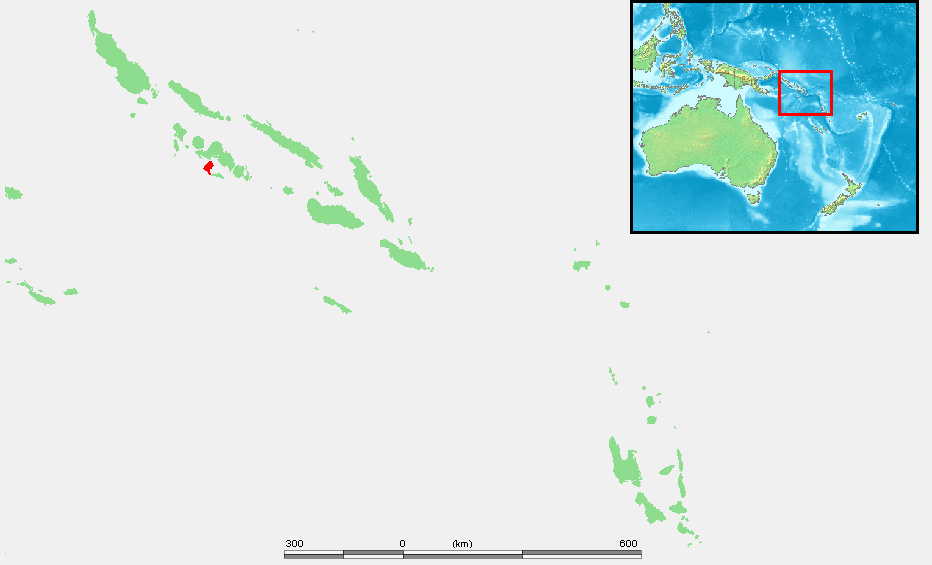

Geography
- Location: South Pacific
- Coordinates: 8°32′00″S 157°20′00″E
- Archipelago: New Georgia Islands
- Area: 411.3 km^{2} (158.8 sq mi)
- Length: 40 km (25 mi)
- Highest elevation: 1,050 m (3440 ft)

Administration
- Solomon Islands
- Province: Western Province

Demographics
- Population: 3,679 (1999 estimate)

Rendova is an island in Western Province, in the independent nation of Solomon Islands, in the South Pacific, east of Papua New Guinea.

== Geography ==
Rendova Island is a roughly rectangular island, located in the South Pacific in the New Georgia Islands. The length of the island is about 40 kilometers. To the north is the island of New Georgia and to the east is the island of Vangunu. Rendova is a volcanic island, with a central stratovolcano cone, with a height of 1,050 metres (3,440 ft) which last erupted in the Pleistocene; however, the island is subject to frequent earthquakes. The island is surrounded in some places by a coral reef. The climate on Rendova is wet and tropical, and the island is subject to frequent cyclones.

=== Flora and fauna ===
The black-sand beaches along the southwest coast of Rendova are important nesting grounds for the critically endangered leatherback turtle. Community-based conservation organisation the Tetepare Descendants' Association runs a leatherback conservation program in the villages of Baniata, Havilla and Retavo on this coastline.

== Population ==
In 1999, the population of Rendova was estimated at 3,679 people. There are two indigenous languages spoken on Rendova Island: the Austronesian language Ughele in the north, and the Papuan language Touo in the south.

== History ==
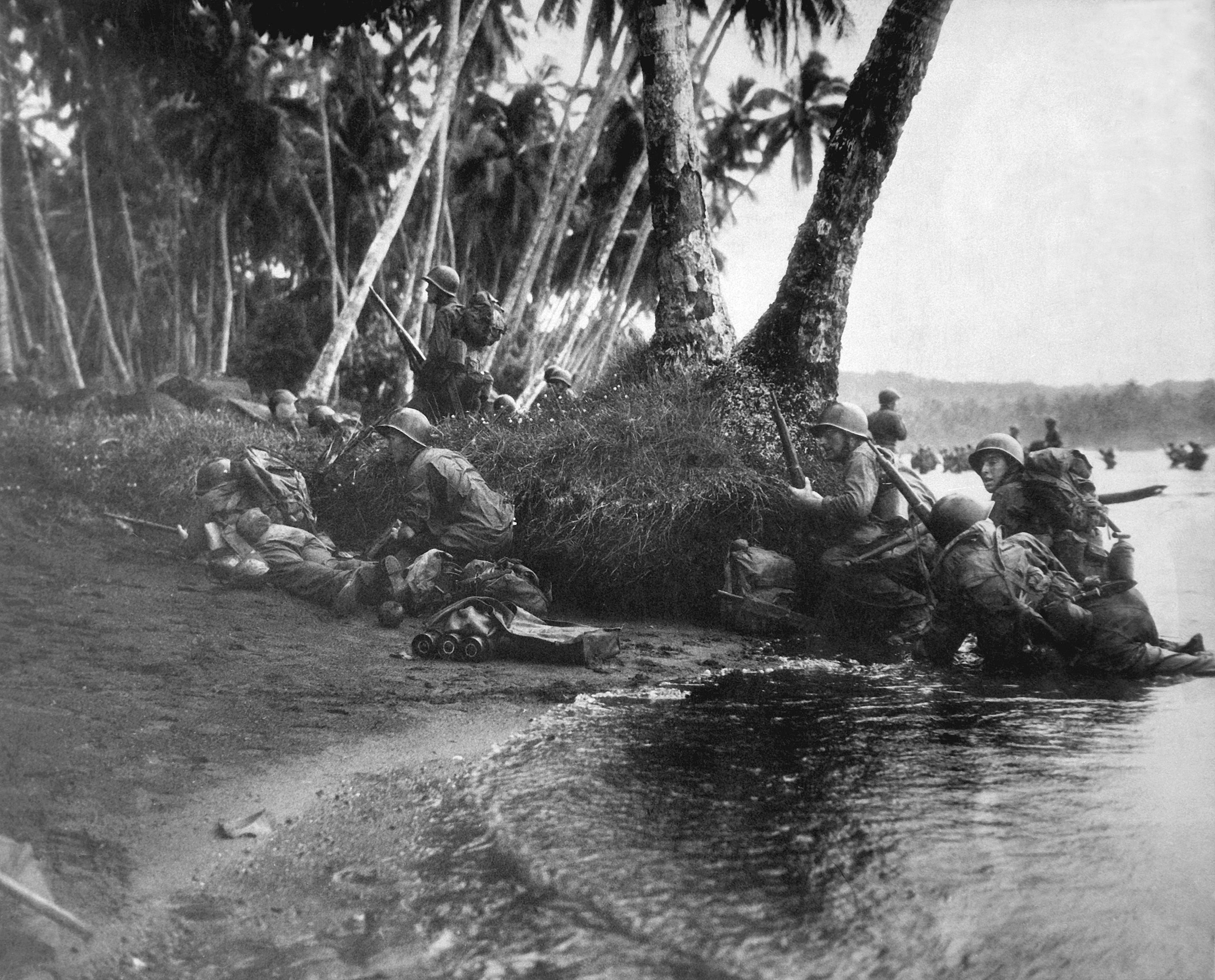
The American landing at Rendova Island

On March 15, 1893, Rendova was declared part of the British Solomon Islands protectorate. The island was occupied by the Empire of Japan in the early stages of World War II. On June 30, 1943, Allied forces carried out the landings on Rendova which quickly overcame the 300-man Japanese garrison as part of a strategy to ultimately recapture Munda and its airfield on the island of New Georgia. The island was subsequently used as a base by the United States Navy for PT boat operations.

Solomon Islanders Biuku Gasa and Eroni Kumana paddled their dugout canoe 35 miles (60 km) to reach the base and deliver a message inscribed on a coconut from then-Lieutenant (junior grade) John F. Kennedy after his PT boat, PT 109, was run down by the Japanese destroyer Amagiri and he and his crew were stranded on one of the local islands. Kennedy would later become President of the United States in 1961.

Since 1978, the island has been part of the independent state of the Solomon Islands.

== In popular culture ==
Rendova is the setting for the 2002 humorous book Solomon Time by Will Randall, about a British school teacher who moves to a village on Rendova to help organise a community project.
