= Kazukuru language =

Extinct Oceanic language of Solomon Islands

Kazukuru
- Native to: Solomon Islands
- Region: New Georgia
- Extinct: early 20th century
- Language family: Austronesian: Malayo-Polynesian; Oceanic; Northwest Solomonic; New Georgia – Ysabel; New Georgia?; Kazukuru

Language codes
- ISO 639-3: kzk
- Glottolog: kazu1245
- Kazukuru is classified as Extinct by the UNESCO Atlas of the World's Languages in Danger.

Kazukuru is an extinct language that was once spoken in New Georgia, Solomon Islands. The Dororo and Guliguli languages, if not spurious, were transcriptional variants, dialects, or closely related. The speakers of Kazukuru gradually merged with the Roviana people from the sixteenth century onward and adopted Roviana as their language. Kazukuru was last recorded in the early twentieth century when its speakers were in the last stages of language shift. Today, Kazukuru is the name of a clan in the Roviana people group.

== History ==
=== Documentation ===
Most of what is known about Kazukuru was collected by W.H.L. Waterhouse and published with S.H. Ray in an article in 1931. Some additional Kazukuru data and the only information on Dororo and Guliguli (two short wordlists) were published by Peter Lanyon-Orgill in 1953. Davis (2003) is skeptical that Guliguli ever existed, since the word guliguli has an obscene meaning in the neighboring Hoava language, and there is no memory among Hoava speakers of a neighboring language with that name. Guliguli was probably either a dialect of Kazukuru, a naive transcription of the name Kazukuru, or even a hoax.

== Classification ==
Arthur Capell suggested that Kazukuru was a non-Austronesian (Papuan) language, and Stephen Wurm accordingly placed all three languages in a 'Kazukuru family' within the East Papuan phylum. However, Michael Dunn and Malcolm Ross (2007) argue that the structure, phonology and lexicon of Kazukuru are strikingly similar to Oceanic languages and that Kazukuru almost certainly was an Oceanic language, related to other New Georgia languages such as Roviana, Hoava and Ghanongga. The alleged Dororo and Guliguli wordlists are so similar to the recorded Kazukuru wordlist that they are almost certainly different transcriptions of the same language.
