= Hakö language =

Austronesian language of Buka Island, Papua New Guinea

Hakö
- Native to: Papua New Guinea
- Region: Buka Island
- Native speakers: 12,000 (2015)
- Language family: Austronesian: Malayo-Polynesian; Oceanic; Western; Meso-Melanesian; Northwest Solomonic; Nehan–Bougainville; Buka; Halia–Hakö; Hakö

Language codes
- ISO 639-3: hao
- Glottolog: hako1237

Hakö is an Austronesian language of Buka Island, Autonomous Region of Bougainville, Papua New Guinea.
