= Zabana language =

Austronesian language spoken in the Solomon Islands

Zabana
- Kia
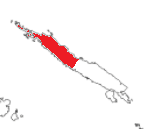
- The extent of the Zabana language on the West Isabel Islands
- Native to: Central Solomon Islands
- Region: Santa Isabel Island
- Native speakers: 3,400 (2003)
- Language family: Austronesian: Malayo-Polynesian; Oceanic; Northwest Solomonic; New Georgia – Ysabel; Ysabel; West Isabel; Zabana

Official status
- Official language in: Solomon Islands

Language codes
- ISO 639-3: kji
- Glottolog: zaba1237
- Zabana is not endangered according to the classification system of the UNESCO Atlas of the World's Languages in Danger

Zabana is an Oceanic language spoken almost exclusively in the Kia district on the northern part of Santa Isabel Island in the Solomon Islands. Zabana is considered a developing language (Expanded Graded Intergenerational Disruption Scale – EGIDS – level 5) which means that the language is in vigorous use, with literature in a standardized form being used by some, though this is not yet widespread or sustainable. It is one of the most spoken languages on Santa Isabel Island, competing with Cheke Holo. There is a 30% to 60% literacy rate in Zabana as a first language and a 25% to 50% literacy rate in Zabana as a second language.

== Location ==
Zabana is almost exclusively spoken on Santa Isabel Island, which is the largest island in the Isabel provenience and the third largest island in the Solomon Island chain. Zabana is one of the eight different languages spoken on Santa Isabel Island. Out of the other seven different languages spoken on the island, Zabana shares major similarities with Kokota and Cheke Holo (also known as Maringe.) A combination dialect of Zabana and Cheke Holo is also developed and widely spoken within the area.

== Phonology ==
		Labial	Alveolar	Velar	Glottal
Nasal		m	n	ŋ	
Plosive	voiceless	p	t	k	
Plosive	voiced	b	d		
Fricative	voiceless	f	s		h
Fricative	voiced	v	z	ɣ	
Lateral			l		
Trill			ɾ		

Zabana only contains open syllables, since there are no consonant clusters and geminate vowels in the language. Vocal stress on a single phoneme does not exist in Zabana; instead, certain syllables called penultimate syllables (the final syllable of a word that ends in a vowel) are stressed. When compared to the neighboring languages, Zabana has fewer phonemes than its neighbors, in particular Kokota.

Frequency of consonant occurrence
Initial	Medial
k 17%	l 13%
p 12%	r 13%
t 10%	k 11%
s 10%	t 9%
m 8%	n 7%
b 7%	p 6%
l 6%	s 6%
r 5%	h 6%
n 4%	m 5%
h 4%	b 4%
d 3%	g 4%
v 3%	gh 4%
f 3%	d 3%
g 2%	v 3%
gh 2%	ng 3%
ng 2%	f 2%
z 1%	z 1%

== Morphology ==
Verbs
English	Zabana
To see	fifini
To drink	ketuhu
To sleep	epu
To fall	riufu/zɔɣu
To eat	mahai
To stand	tetu
To sew	tena
To vomit	mumuti
To flow	ɔrɔ/kɔtɔrɔ
To dig	hara

There are two types of verbs in Zabana, transitive and intransitive verbs.

- Transitive verb: can be attached with a suffix which indexes the direct or indirect object.
- Intransitive verb: verbs which convey motion of some sort.

Nouns
English	Zabana
Mother	uke
Father	mama
House	suga
Tooth	hiŋa-
Blood	busaka-
Eye	hiba-
Egg	tediri
Dog	meusu
Rat	pupurudu
Fruit	fua-
Fish	namari

In Zabana, possession is denoted syntactically by a possessive suffix attached to the noun such as no or ka. Words such as 'father', 'mother', and 'uncle' can never take on a possessive suffix.

Adjectives
English	Zabana
Rotten	bɔe
Cold	kapɔ
Warm	daŋava
Red	busaka
Yellow	hekɔ
Green	dɔdɔli
Black	sisibe
Good	veha|na
Bad/evil	mukɔ
Heavy	tahu
Wet	bɔese
Dry	ka|raŋɔ

Numbers
English	Zabana
One	kaike-ɣu
Two	palu-ɣu
Three	litɔ-ɣu
Four	rɔdana-ɣu
Five	gahaɣu
Six	ɔnɔmɔɣu
Seven	vituɣu
Eight	hanaɣu
Nine	leɣahaɣu
Ten	tazo
One hundred	kaike ɣɔbi
One thousand	kaike tɔɤa

Larger numbers are made by compounding cardinal numbers, such as one through ten, and the exponential factors of ten, such as one hundred and one thousand.

Base	Reduplicate
nohe 'sit'	nonohe 'seat form'
goto 'to boil'	gotogoto 'to sweat'
baolo 'to name'	babaolo 'name'

Reduplication is used in Zabana to derive intransitive verbs from transitive terms and to derive nouns from verbs.

Interrogative words
English	Zabana
Who	hei
What/why	heve
Where/which	hae
When/how much/how many	niha

== Sentence structure ==
Zabana is a mainly a verb–subject–object (VSO) language.

=== Declarative ===
Declarative sentences are denoted by a drop in intonation at the end of the sentence and the basic sentence structure or word ordering of a declarative sentence is shown below.

Ghe manevaka ianimu neke
predicate subject {direct object} {oblique object}
'but whiteman there stay'

=== Interrogative ===
There are four basic types of question sentences in Zabana: polar questions (yes/no), content questions, alternative questions, and dubitative questions (rhetorical).

- Polar question: denoted by a rise in intonation at the end of a sentence
- Content question: denoted by the use of one of the four interrogative words and by a fall in intonation at the end of the question
- Alternative question: in Zabana they are usually request or open-ended questions

=== Honorific language ===
There is a chiefly language form of Zabana which is used when addressing clan chiefs.

English	Common form	Chiefly form
Child	rekaha	suli gitau
Eye	hiba	nahali
Sleep	epu	megho
Fall	riufu	neukete

=== Complex sentences ===
Complex sentences in Zabana are formed when a conjoined clause is used in a sentence, by using one of the three different connectors: nia, ga, and ba, which are 'and', 'or', and 'but' respectively. The exception to this rule is the connecting particle ghe, which is used to denote a conditional sentence or question, and nia must be used to connect the pronoun and the proper noun together. Ghe can also be used in a complex sentence to link together two different proper nouns.

=== Conditional sentences ===
In Zabana there are two different types of conditional sentences: simple and counterfactual sentences. Both sentences use the particle la to denote that they are conditional sentences.

- Simple conditional: denoted by the use of the particle to along with the particle la, simple conditional sentences state a hypothetical situation in Zabana.

Example: To nanarela ghatu e kotoro hofi ini

'If it rains today, the roof will leak.'

- Counterfactual: states a situation where the condition is no fulfilled.

Example: Geke meha la ia vaka norao gela to lao ara kia

'If the boat had come yesterday, I would have gone to Kia.'
