= Ghanongga language =

Austronesian language spoken in the Solomon Islands

Ghanongga
- Ganoqa
- Native to: Solomon Islands
- Region: Northern Ranongga Island
- Native speakers: (2,500 cited 1999)
- Language family: Austronesian: Malayo-Polynesian; Oceanic; Northwest Solomonic; New Georgia – Ysabel; New Georgia; Ghanongga

Language codes
- ISO 639-3: ghn
- Glottolog: ghan1242

Ghanongga, or Ganoqa, is an Oceanic language spoken by about 2,500 people on the northern half of Ranongga Island, Solomon Islands.
