= Marovo Lagoon =

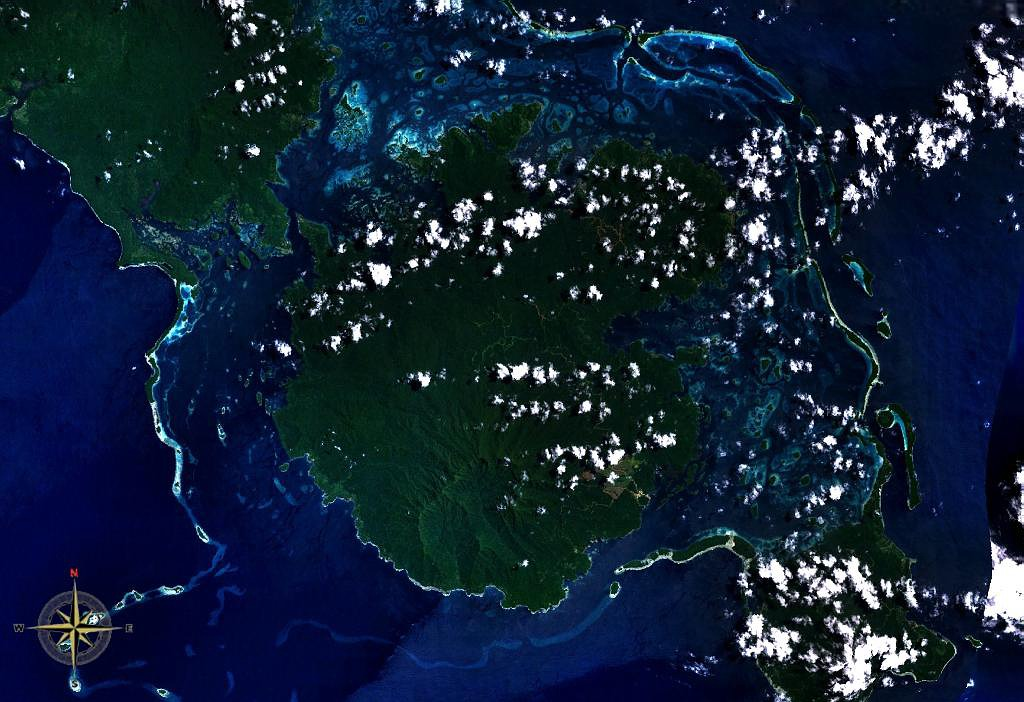
Vangunu Island seen from space. Marovo lagoon can be seen north of the island.

Marovo Lagoon is the largest double-barrier enclosed lagoon in the world. Located in the New Georgia Islands, Western Province, Solomon Islands, between Vangunu and Nggatokae islands, both extinct volcanic islands, at 8.48°S 158.07°E. It covers 700 km^{2} (270 mi^{2}) and is protected by a double barrier reef system. The Marovo Lagoon World Heritage Area is considered an area of high biodiversity and conservation value. The name Marovo is derived from the island of Marovo in the centre of the lagoon.

Reef sites at the edge of the lagoon were surveyed in 2014. The sites with the highest Live Coral Cover (LCC) in the Western Province and second highest in the Solomons were on the exposed side of the fringing reef near Marovo Lagoon measuring an average of 49% LCC. The exposed side of the fringing reef of Marovo Lagoon had an average of 38% LCC. The sites with the lowest live coral cover were found near Munda with an average of 18% LCC.

Sightings of Indo-Pacific bottlenose dolphin (Tursiops aduncus) have been confirmed in the lagoon.

There are many islands in the lagoon, some of which are inhabited. The people speak the Marovo language and live mainly by subsistence agriculture and are skilled at fishing. The men from Marovo Lagoon are known to be skilled carvers, creating and designing beautiful wooded carvings made from ebony, hardwood and kerosene wood.

The lagoon is a popular destination for diving and is a tourism hub for travelers from Australia, New Zealand, Europe and the United States.

It is possible to travel to the Lagoon from the Solomon Islands' capital city, Honiara by 1 hour on a twin otter plane or 10 hours on a weekly ferry.
