= Mono-Alu language =

Austronesian language of the Solomon Islands

Mono-Alu
- Mono, Alu
- Native to: Solomon Islands
- Region: Western Province
- Native speakers: 5,000 (2020)
- Language family: Austronesian: Malayo-Polynesian; Oceanic; Western; Meso-Melanesian; Northwest Solomonic; Mono–Uruavan; Mono-Alu
- Dialects: Mono; Alu; Fauro
- Writing system: Latin

Language codes
- ISO 639-3: mte
- Glottolog: mono1273
- ELP: Mono (Solomon Islands)
- The Mono-Alu language is spoken across the Western Province.
- Coordinates: 7.08°S 155.85°E

Mono-Alu, also known as Mono, is an Austronesian language spoken by around 6,000 people on the islands of Mono, Alu, and Fauro in the Western Province of the Solomon Islands. It is the primary language of the islands of Mono and Alu in the Treasury Islands, as well as Fauro Island in the Shortland Islands.

The language area is located in the northwestern part of the Solomon Islands, south and southeast of Bougainville Island, Papua New Guinea. The communities are often collectively referred to as FAMOA, representing Fauro, Mono, and Alu Islands.

While the 1999 census reported 2,944 speakers, research informed by community reports suggests a significantly higher population than previously thought. The total number of speakers was estimated to exceed 5,000 in 2020, with approximately 3,000 speakers on Alu Island, 1,500 on Fauro Island, and 800 on Mono Island, as well as diaspora communities in Honiara and other islands in the Western Province. The language is the primary language spoken on the islands along with Pijin.

== Orthography ==
The alphabet consists of 19 letters: A, B, D, E, F, G, H, I, K, L, M, N, O, P, R, S, T, U, and V.

R was traditionally used more than D, but D is used more often in loanwords or in names that have been introduced into the language. It is also used to represent the allophonic variant [d] of the phoneme /ɾ/.

The letter V is used to represent the allophonic variant [v] of the phoneme /b/.

The letter H is sometimes replaced by F.

The length distinctions of vowels and nasals are not represented in the current orthography.

Although not in the alphabet, the letters J and Z can be used to represent the marginal phonemes /d͡ʒ/ and /z/ respectively, which only occur in loanwords.

== Phonology ==
=== Consonants ===
There are 13 phonemic consonants in Mono-Alu.

	Labial	Coronal	Velar	Glottal
Nasal	m	n	ŋ ⟨ng⟩	
Plosive	p b	t	k g	ʔ
Fricative		s		h
Tap		ɾ ⟨r⟩		
Approximant	(w) ⟨u⟩	l	(j) ⟨i⟩	

- /b/ can also be heard as fricatives [β, v] under certain conditions.
- /ɡ/ can be heard as [ɣ] in free variation.
- /ɾ/ can also be heard as [d] in free variation within word-initial position, or as [dɾ] when following a nasal.
- /u/ and /i/ are heard as glides [w, j] within vowel environments.

=== Vowels ===
The Mono-Alu vowel system consists of five phonemic monophthongs and three long vowels.

	Front	Central	Back
High	i		u, uː
Mid	ɛ ⟨e⟩		ɔ, ɔː ⟨o⟩
Low		ɐ, ɐː ⟨a⟩	

- /i/ has the allophone [iʲ] and occurs before other vowels (e.g. [sɐpɐiʲɐ] ‘tuber species’, [mɐniʲɔkɔ] ‘papaya’).
- /u/ can occur as [ʊ] in casual speech when the vowel is short, and does not occur in word-final open syllables. The allophone [uʷ] occurs before /i/ and /ɛ/ (e.g. [kuʷisɐ] ‘basket’, [suʷɛlɛ] ‘sleep’).
- /ɔ/ has the allophonic variant [ɔʷ] and it occurs in the exclamation [kɔʷɛ] and is the only instance where this allophone is attested. Elsewhere, it is pronounced as [ɔ].
- /ɐ/ and /ɛ/ do not have allophones.

=== Syllable structure ===
The syllable structure can be either (C)V_{1}(V_{2})(N) or (ʔ)N, where C can be any consonant (including nasals), V can be any vowel, and N can be either /n/ or /ŋ/. The sequence V_{1}V_{2} represents a long vowel if both Vs are the same phoneme, or a diphthong if they are different. In the syllable pattern (ʔ)N, N is a nasal syllabic nucleus (e.g. [ŋ̍.kɐ] ‘mother’, [ŋ̍.kɔ.tɔ] ‘take, hold’).

In both the coda and nucleic positions, N is always realized as velar [ŋ] before /k/, /g/ /ʔ/, and /h/.

== Numerals ==
The number system of Mono-Alu is similar to other Austronesian languages. For example, Mono-Alu shares the words for the numbers 'two' (elua) and 'five' (lima) with the Hawaiian language. A word for 'zero' (menna) exists in the language and also holds the meaning of 'nothing.' In 1986, researcher Joel Fagan at the Australian National University identified the numbers from one to ten thousand in Mono-Alu.

Cardinal	English
Menna	zero
Kala (or elea)	one
Elua	two
Episa	three
Ehati	four
Lima	five
Onomo	six
Hitu	seven
Alu	eight
Ulia	nine
Lafulu	ten
Lafulu rohona elea	eleven
Lafulu rohona elua	twelve
Lafulu rohona episa	thirteen
Lafulu rohona efati	fourteen
Lafulu rohona lima	fifteen
Lafulu rohona onomo	sixteen
Lafulu rohona hitu	seventeen
Lafulu rohona alu	eighteen
Lafulu rohona ulia	nineteen
Elua lafulu (or Tanaoge)	twenty
Episa lafulu (or Pisafulu)	thirty
Efati lafulu (or Fatiafulu)	forty
Lima lafulu (or limafulu)	fifty
Onomo lafulu	sixty
Fitu lafulu	seventy
Alu lafulu	eighty
Ulia lafulu (or Siafulu)	ninety
Ea latuu	one-hundred
Elua latuu	two-hundred
Ea kokolei	one-thousand
Elua kokolei	two-thousand
Lafulu kokolei	ten-thousand

Mono-Alu also makes use of ordinal numbers. However, only 'first' (famma) is a unique word, and the rest are constructed through affixations.

Ordinal	English
famma	first
Fa-elua-naang	second
Fa-epis-naana	third
Fa-ehati-naana	fourth
Fa-lima-naana	fifth
Fa-onomo-naana	sixth
Fa-hitu-naana	seventh
Fa-alu-naana	eighth
Fa-ulia-naana	ninth
Fa-lafulu-naana	tenth

== Grammar ==
=== Pronouns ===
Mono-Alu, like many other Austronesian languages, uses two separate pronouns for the first-person plural to express clusivity; that is, one first-person plural pronoun is inclusive (including the listener), and the other is exclusive (not including the listener). Mono-Alu does not have third-person pronouns. Below is a translated list of pronouns and their possessives.

			Pronoun	Obj	Suffix	Other
1st person	singular		mafa	-afa	-gu	sagu
1st person	plural	exclusive	mani	-ami	-mang, -ma	samang/sama
1st person	plural	inclusive	maita	-ita	-ra	sara
2nd person	singular		maito	-o	-ng	sang
2nd person	plural		maang	-ang	-mia	samia
3rd person	singular		---	-i, -ng	-na	sana
3rd person	plural		---	-ri, -iri	-ria	saria

=== Affixes ===
Mono-Alu is very specific regarding adverbs and other verb affixes. Verbs can be altered with a prefix, infix, and suffix.

Prefixes		Infixes		Suffixes	
ang	relative prefix, alternate forms an, ai, a'nta	fa	infix denoting completion	ai	there, away
fa	causative prefix, fa becomes f before a, alternate form ha	fang	one another (reciprocal infix), alternate form fan	ma	hither, thither, alternate form ama
ta	infix or prefix showing action or state.	fero	elsewhere, to somewhere else		
		isa	together, at the same time, alternate sa		
		male	again (also occurs independently)		
		mea	makes a plural		
		meka	until tired, for a very long time, alternate form meko		

a	place where or whether, alternate form ang occurs after a
ng	added to the first of two names gives the meaning 'and', alternate form m
ua	denotes addition, 'and', 'with'

-a	'of', especially before -ang, alternate forms an, ang, aan
afa-	'what?'
-ata	often found after verbs and other words, alternate forms eta, ita, ota, uta
ga	particle, most often after the first word in a sentence, untranslatable; 'so, therefore' at the beginning of a sentence, also used with pronoun forms to emphasise them: gafa, gami, gai, gaina, gang, etc.
-nana	equivalent to copula, alternate form nina
-titi	strengthens the idea of repetition or duration

=== Grammatical gender ===
There are two ways of indicating differences of grammatical gender:

1. By different words: - e.g.
  - Tiong 'man' – Betafa 'woman'
  - Fanua 'men' – Talaiva 'women'
  - Lalaafa 'headman' – Mamaefa 'head woman'
  - Tua-na 'his grandfather' – Tete-na 'his grandmother'
  - Kanega 'old man' (husband) – Magota 'old woman' (wife)
2. By using an ordinal indicative of sex: – e.g.
  - Kui manuale 'baby' (male) – Kui batafa 'baby' (female)
  - Boo sule 'boar' – Boo tuaru 'sow' (sule and tuaru are used for animals only)

In other cases, there is no distinction between masculine, feminine, and neutral.

=== Adverbs ===
Some exceptions within the rules of Mono-Alu have been discovered.

Two adverbs of place, instead of being written with a double consonant, are written with only one accented consonant.

- e.g. Nai (instead of NNai) – 'here'
- 'Nao (instead of NNao) – 'there'

Instead of the aspirate h, the letter f can be used:

1. in verbs preceded by the causative ha (or fa)
  - e.g. fasoku (or hasoku) – 'let come'
2. in verbs preceded by the prefix han (or fan), meaning reciprocity or duality
  - e.g. fanua (or hanua) - 'mon'
  - mafa (or maha) - 'I, no'

=== Articles ===
There are no definite articles in Mono-Alu. The number elea ('one') is used as an indefinite article.
