= Blablanga language =

Austronesian language spoken in the Solomon Islands

Blablanga
- Native to: Central Solomon Islands
- Region: Santa Isabel Island
- Native speakers: c. 1,150 (2008–09)
- Language family: Austronesian: Malayo-Polynesian; Oceanic; Northwest Solomonic; New Georgia – Ysabel; Ysabel; Central Isabel; Blablanga

Language codes
- ISO 639-3: blp
- Glottolog: blab1237
- ELP: Blablanga
- Blablanga is classified as Definitely Endangered by the UNESCO Atlas of the World's Languages in Danger.

Blablanga is an Oceanic language spoken in the Solomon Islands. Its speakers live on Santa Isabel Island.

== Bibliography ==
- Voica, Radu (2017). A Fieldwork-Based Approach to Blanga (Blablanga), an Austronesian Language of the Solomon Islands, with Reference to Predicate-Argument Relations (PhD thesis). SOAS University of London. doi:10.25501/SOAS.00026175.
