= Cheke Holo language =

Austronesian language spoken in the Solomon Islands

Cheke Holo
- Native to: Central Solomon Islands
- Region: Santa Isabel Island
- Native speakers: (10,800 cited 1999); 1,500 monolinguals
- Language family: Austronesian: Malayo-Polynesian; Oceanic; Northwest Solomonic; New Georgia – Ysabel; Ysabel; East Isabel; Cheke Holo

Language codes
- ISO 639-3: mrn
- Glottolog: chek1238

Cheke Holo (also called Maringe or Mariŋe, A'ara, Holo, Kubonitu) is an Oceanic language spoken in the Solomon Islands. Its speakers live on Santa Isabel Island.

== Phonology ==
The phonology of Cheke Holo shows some peculiarities, shared with other Santa Isabel languages, like the aspirated stops and the voiceless sonorants. The five-vowel system instead conforms to the prototypical system of the Oceanic area. Boswell (2018) has /x/ rather than /ɣʰ/.

Consonant phonemes
		Labial		Alveolar		Palatal		Velar		Glottal
Nasal		m̥	m	n̥	n	ɲ̊	ɲ	ŋ̊	ŋ	
Stop	plain	p	b	t	d	t͡ʃ	d͡ʒ	k	ɡ	ʔ
Stop	aspirated	pʰ		tʰ				kʰ		
Fricative	plain	f	v	s	z				ɣ	h
Fricative	aspirated								ɣʰ	
Lateral				l̥	l					
Trill				r̥	r					

Vowel phonemes
	Front	Central	Back
High	i		u
Mid	e		o
Low		a	

== Morphosyntax ==
Verbs in Cheke Holo are marked neither for tense nor for person, although they can be prefixed with fa- (a causative marker) and they take enclitics. Among the possible clitics are the direct object pronouns, the completive aspect markers hi and hila, and the continuative aspect marker u.

Reduplication is commonly employed with verb roots to express iteration or intensification and as a valency changing device (from intransitive to transitive), although there are attested cases of adjective and (less so) noun reduplication. Different types of reduplications are possible in Cheke Holo:

- Full reduplication
  - /vra/ 'jump up' > /vravra/ 'be quick to act'
- Partial (or White's rule) reduplication
  - /bela/ 'wooden platform' > /beabela/ 'stack up firewood'
- Syllable reduplication
  - /nolo/ 'to walk' > /nonolo/ 'go walking about'
  - /kmokhu/ 'stop' > /kmokmohu/ 'continue to cease'
  - /fruni/ 'cover' > /fufruni/ 'cover completely' (when the second consonant of a cluster is /r/, this is dropped in the reduplicated syllable)
