= Vangunu =

Island in Solomon Islands

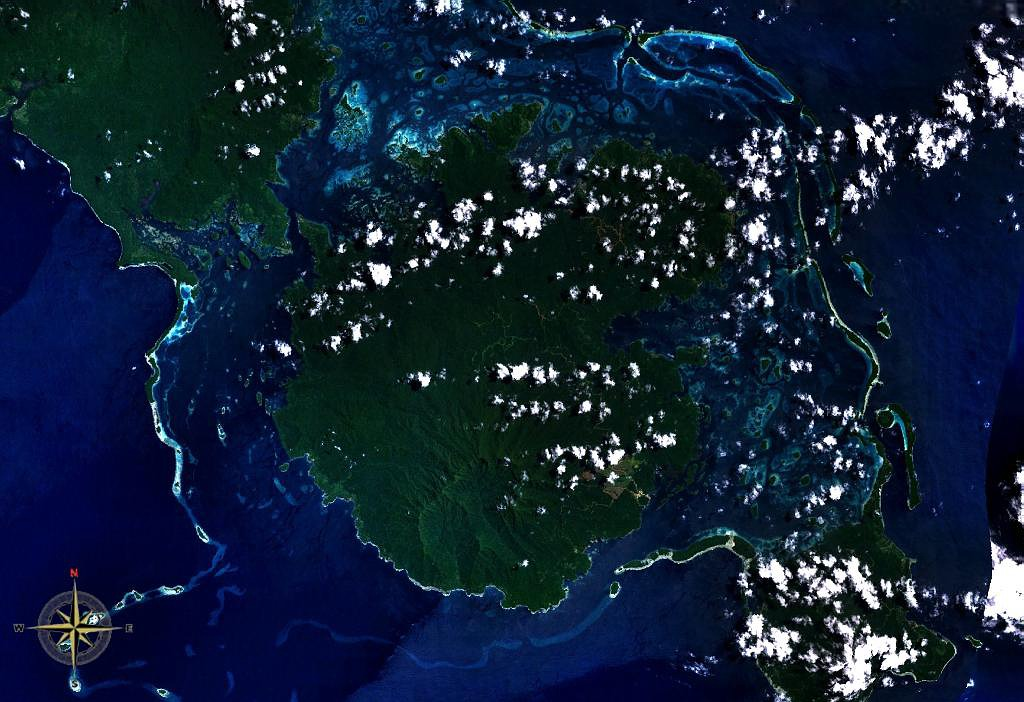
- Vangunu Island seen from space

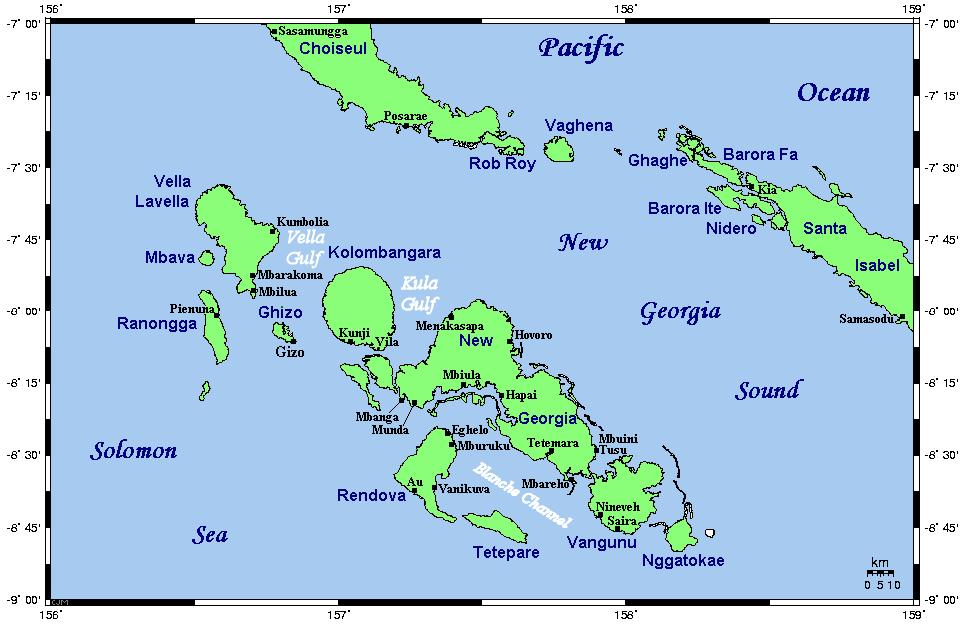
- Location of the island in the New Georgia Group

- Location in Solomon Islands

Geography
- Location: South Pacific
- Coordinates: 8°37′33″S 157°58′54″E
- Archipelago: New Georgia Islands
- Area: 509 km^{2} (197 sq mi)
- Highest elevation: 1,082 m (3550 ft)

Administration
- Solomon Islands
- Province: Western Province

Demographics
- Population: 2212 (1999)
- Pop. density: 4,35/km^{2} (1127/sq mi)

Vangunu is an island, part of the New Georgia Islands in Western Province, Solomon Islands. It is located between New Georgia and Nggatokae Island. To the north and east of the island is Marovo Lagoon. The island has an area of 509 square kilometres (197 sq mi).

There are a small number of coastal settlements on the island, including Zaira and Halisi.

== History ==
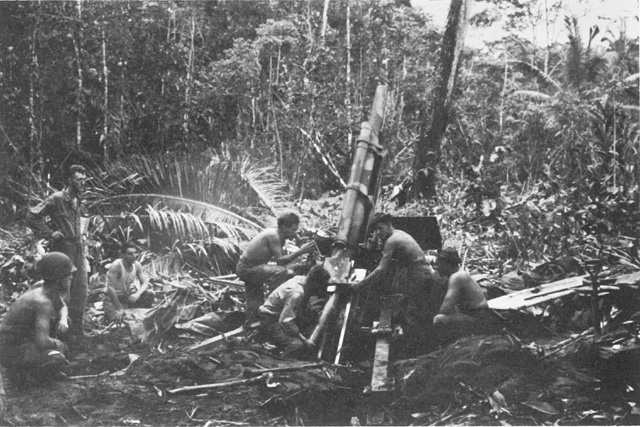
U.S. Army's 152nd Field Artillery Battalion supports the assault on Wickham Anchorage, on or around 1 July 1943

On March 15, 1893, Vangunu was declared part of the British Solomon Islands protectorate. The island was occupied by the Japanese army in October 1942, during the Solomon Islands campaign. From 30 June to 3 July 1943, it was the site of one of the first land battles of the New Georgia Campaign, the battle of Wickham Anchorage, during which a small Japanese force was quickly defeated by numerically superior allied forces.

Since 1978, the island has been part of the independent state of the Solomon Islands.

== Geography ==
The island is located at the southern end of the New Georgia Islands archipelago. To the north-west is the island of New Georgia and to the south-east is the island of Nggatokae. The largest saltwater lagoon in the world, the Marovo Lagoon, encircles most of the island. Vangunu is a volcanic island, dominated by an inactive Pleistocene stratovolcano with a height of 1,082 metres (3,550 ft), whose caldera slopes are now covered with thick jungle forest.

Around 28 kilometres (17 mi) to the south of Vangunu lies the submarine volcano known as Kavachi, the only currently active volcano of the archipelago, and one of the most active submarine volcanoes in the south-west Pacific Ocean.

== Ecology, flora and fauna ==
On the southern side of the island, the forests and coastline around the tiny community of Zaira are pristine and unique, providing habitat for at least three vulnerable species of animals: the leatherback turtles, the Vangunu giant rat, and the New Georgia monkey-faced bat. The latter two are only found in this location. The Vanganu giant rat was documented for the first time in 2017 by Tyrone Lavery, and is considered critically endangered due to the small amount of forest habitat — about 80 square kilometres (31 sq mi) — remaining on the island amid ongoing logging.

The 200 inhabitants of Zaira have been trying to get the forests declared a protected area, so that logging and mining cannot disturb and pollute the pristine forests and coastline.

== Demographics ==
In 1999, the population of Vangunu was estimated at 2,212 people. Most of the people of Vangunu speak Vangunu language, while those in the northern part of the island, around the Marovo lagoon, speak the closely related Marovo language. They live mainly by subsistence agriculture and are skilled at fishing.
