= Marovo language =

Austronesian language spoken in the Solomon Islands

Marovo
- Region: Solomon Islands
- Native speakers: (8,100 cited 1999)
- Language family: Austronesian: Malayo-Polynesian; Oceanic; Northwest Solomonic; New Georgia – Ysabel; New Georgia; Marovo

Language codes
- ISO 639-3: mvo
- Glottolog: maro1244

Marovo is an Austronesian language of the Solomon Islands. It is spoken in the New Georgia Group on islands in Marovo Lagoon and on the neighbouring islands of New Georgia, Vangunu and Nggatokae. The usual word order in sentences is verb–subject–object.

Names for local fauna are similar to but still much distinct from those in Roviana (and presumably other New Georgia languages).

== Phonology ==
=== Consonants ===
		Labial	Alveolar	Palatal	Velar
Nasal		m	n		ŋ
Stop/ Affricate	voiceless	p	t	tʃ	k
Stop/ Affricate	prenasal	ᵐb	ⁿd	ᶮdʒ	ᵑɡ
Fricative		β	s		ɣ
Lateral			l		
Tap			ɾ		

=== Vowels ===
	Front	Central	Back
High	i		u
Mid	e		o
Low		a	

Vowel length is also distinctive.
