= Roviana language =

Austronesian language spoken in the Solomon Islands

Roviana
- Native to: Solomon Islands
- Region: north central New Georgia Island
- Native speakers: (9,900 cited 1999); L2 speakers: 16,000 (1987)
- Language family: Austronesian: Malayo-Polynesian; Oceanic; Northwest Solomonic; New Georgia – Ysabel; New Georgia; Roviana–Kusaghe; Roviana

Language codes
- ISO 639-3: rug
- Glottolog: rovi1238

Roviana is a member of the Northwest Solomonic branch of Oceanic languages. It is spoken around Roviana and Vonavona lagoons at the north central New Georgia in the Solomon Islands. It has 10,000 first-language speakers and an additional 16,000 people mostly over 30 years old speak it as a second language (Raymond 2005). In the past, Roviana was widely used as a trade language and further used as a lingua franca, especially for church purposes in the Western Province, but now it is being replaced by the Solomon Islands Pijin. Published studies on Roviana include: Ray (1926), Waterhouse (1949) and Todd (1978) contain the syntax of Roviana. Corston-Oliver (1996 & 2002) discuss ergativity in Roviana. Todd (2000) and Ross (1988) discuss the clause structure in Roviana. Schuelke (2020) discusses grammatical relations and syntactic ergativity in Roviana.

== Phonology and orthography ==
=== Consonants ===
		Labial	Alveolar	Velar	Glottal
Nasal		m ⟨m⟩	n ⟨n⟩	ŋ ⟨ng⟩	
Plosive	voiced	ᵐb ⟨b⟩	ⁿd ⟨d⟩	ᵑɡ ⟨q⟩	
Plosive	voiceless	p ⟨p⟩	t ⟨t⟩	k ⟨k⟩	
Fricative	voiced	β ⟨v⟩	z ⟨z⟩	ɣ ⟨g⟩	
Fricative	voiceless		s ⟨s⟩		h ⟨h⟩
Rhotic			r ⟨r⟩		
Lateral			l ⟨l⟩		

The Roviana alphabet is based on the Latin alphabet and consists of the above letters.

allophones: [h] ~ [ɦ] ([+voiced]) / V_V → /huhuβe/ [huɦuβe] 'bathing'

[ŋ] ~ [ɲ] / _V [-back] → /ŋiɾa/ [ɲiɾa] 'strong'

/r/ is lightly trilled in unstressed syllables and strongly trilled in stressed syllables.

=== Vowels ===
	Front	Back
High	i	u
Mid	e	o
Low	a	

V → V: / stressed Vs

V → Ṽ / _N

[a] ~ [ə] / _V → /leana/ [leəna]

=== Phonotactics ===
(C) V

(C represents a single consonant and V represents a monophthong or diphthong.)

==== Diphthongs ====
There are five diphthongs; /ei/, /ai/, /ae/, /au/, and /oi/

The majority of lexical morphemes consist of two or three syllables. Lexical morphemes consisting of four syllables or a single syllable are uncommon whereas morphemes consisting of more than four syllables have never occurred.

=== Stress ===
Stress is not contrastive.

1. Roots of one syllable, with the exception of prepositions and articles;
  1. /ˈla/ 'go', /ˈmae/ 'come'
2. Roots of two syllables are stressed on the initial syllables;
  1. /ˈzama/ 'talk', /ˈtalo/ 'taro'
3. Roots of more than two syllables are stressed on the first and second syllables;
  1. /ˈeˈhara/ 'blood', /ˈsiˈɡareti/ 'cigarette'

The nominalising infix ⟨in⟩ occurs within the first syllable of the root, it always receives stress;

/ˈɣani/ 'eat', /ˈɣiˈnani/ 'food'

All material which precedes the root (prefixes and reduplicated material) is assigned stress as if it were a single root;

/ˈβari-ˈpera/ 'fight', /ˈhabo-ˈhabotu-ana/ 'chair'

The transitive suffix /-i/ takes stress;

/ˈseke-ˈi-a/ 'hit him/her/it'

Other suffixes, however, do not take stress and are ignored in determining the placement of stress. Material following the root is not treated as a unit for the purpose of stress assignment;

/ˈdoɣoˈr-i-ɣami/ 'see us (EXClusive)'

The suffix /-ɣami/ does not receive stress.

Stress is assigned independently to each root in a compound:

/βetu/ + /lotu/ → /ˈβetuˈlotu/ 'church ('pray' + 'house')'

== Grammar ==
Roviana word order is verb–subject–object (VSO).

=== Pronouns ===
Person	Absolute	Ergative	Focal	English
1st person	arau	rau	arau	I, me
	gita	gita	gita	we (incl)
	gami	gami	gami	we(excl)
2nd person	agoi	goi	agoi	you (sg)
	gamu	gamu	gamu	you (pl)
3rd person	asa	sa	asda	s/he/it
	sarini	ri	arini	they

==== Pronominal suffixes ====
		singular	plural
1st person	exclusive	-qu	-mami
1st person	inclusive	-qu	-da
2nd person		-mu	-mia
3rd person		-na	-di

These are suffixed to direct/inalienable possessions such as kin terms and parts of the body.

lima-na
hand-3SG
'his/her/its hand'

tama-qu
father-1SG
'my father'

==== Preposed possessor ====
		singular	plural
1st person	exclusive	qua	mami
1st person	inclusive	qua	nada
2nd person		mua	mia
3rd person		nana	dia

These are suffixed to indirect or alienable possessions:

nana hore
POSS:3SG canoe
'his/her canoe'

mia popoa
POSS:2SG home
'their home'

==== Postposed possessor ====
		singular	plural
1st person	exclusive	taqa	tani/tami
1st person	inclusive	taqa	tani
2nd person		tamu	tani/tamu
3rd person		tadi	tadi

These are suffixed to a second kind of indirect or alienable possessions:

Hie sa lose tanisa
This DEF room POSS:3PL
'This is his/her room'

		singular	plural
1st person	exclusive	gequ	gemami
1st person	inclusive	gequ	gada
2nd person		gemu	gemi
3rd person		gena	gedi

The possessive for food is prefixed ge or ga:

gemi ginani
POSS:2PL food
'your food'

		singular	plural
1st person	exclusive	equ	emami
1st person	inclusive	equ	eda
2nd person		emu	emi
3rd person		ena	edi

The possessive for desire is prefixed o or e:

equ puta
POSS:1SG sleep
'I want to sleep'

==== Interrogative pronouns ====
Inter.Pronouns	English
esei	who
arisei	who (pl)
esei ri kara	who (of two persons)
tesei	whose
sa/na sa	what
sa sari	what (pl)
savana	which
na sa ri kara	which (of two things)

==== Indefinite pronouns ====
Indef.Pronouns	English
keke tie	a man
ke tie	any man
isa si keke	another
keke nana koburu	one of his/her kids
kaiqa pule	others/some more
ka visavisa/kaiqa	some/few
loke tie	no one
votiki zinama	different language
loke toŋa	nothing/none

==== Demonstrative pronouns ====
Dem. pronouns	E.g. sentence/question	English
hie/si hie/hiera	sa tie hie/sa si hie? /hiera sa qua vetu	this man/what is this?/this is my house
hoi/sana/asa	asa sa vineki hoi/na tie sana/asa se Maria	that's the girl there/that man/that's Maria
hire/si hire	hire mua buka/tamu goi si hire?	these are your books/are these yours?
hiroi	hiroi mua buka	those are your books

=== Nouns ===
There are two classes of nouns in Roviana. The first includes kin terms, body parts and some local nouns. These are used with suffixed personal pronouns such as:

tinaqu – 'my mother'
mata-na – 'her/his /its eyes'

Nouns of the second class are used with separate possessive words such as:

qua buka – 'my book'
nana vetu – 'his/her/its house'

Local nouns are formed from verbs by the suffix ana. They denote a place where an action is performed:

habotu - 'sit'
habo-habotu-ana - 'chair'

Nouns are formed from verbs & adjectives by the infix ⟨in⟩. When the verb or adjective begins with a vowel, ⟨in⟩ is prefixed:

ene - 'to walk'
inene - 'a journey'

When the verb or adjective begins a consonant in is infixed after the first consonant:

kera - 'sing'
kinera -'song'

A noun can also be formed by in from the causative or reciprocal forms of verbs:

gila -'to know'
vagila - 'to show'
vinagila-gila - 'a sign'

==== Demonstratives ====
Articles in Roviana occur before the noun, marking the noun phrase as common or proper. Roviana has definite and indefinite articles.

The indefinite article is na:

na nana buka
INDEF POSS:3SG book
'his/her book'

na can also be exchanged with sa:

sa hore
'the canoe'

na and sa may also be applied with plural nouns:

na tie habahuala -di
INDEF person poor POSS:3PL
'the poor people'

The definite article is sa:

sa dia vetu
DEF POSS:3PL house
'their house'

The personal articles are the non- absolutive e and absolutive se. E is commonly used with a proper noun in the subjective case, se in the objective:

Dogoria rau se Nate rane sarere lahe.
saw 1SG ABS Nate rane sarere lahe
'I saw Nate last Saturday.'

== Syntax ==
=== Imperative and interrogative sentences ===
==== Imperative sentences ====
An actor can optionally be omitted (1); otherwise there is no structural difference from a declarative clause (2).

La (si goi).
go ABS 2SG
'Go!'

Va-mae-a sa magu.
CAUS-come-3SG DEF knife
'Give me the knife!'

==== Interrogative sentences ====
Yes–no questions are structurally identical to declaratives, but have a distinct rising intonation. The two single word answers are uve 'yes' and lokari 'no'.

Wh-questions or information questions contain an interrogative phrase in focus position (i.e. clause initial) and optionally is followed by the focal particle si; for example,

ae 'where?'
esei 'who?'
kavisa 'how many/much?'
sa 'what?'
vea 'how?, why?'

Esei poza-mu si agoi?
who name-2SG FOC 2SG:FOC
'What is your name?' (lit. 'Who is your name?')

Interrogative morphemes are frequently preceded by the disjunctive particle na;

na vea ke 'why?'
na sa 'what?'

=== Complex sentences ===
==== Coordination ====
Coordination is marked by a conjunction between the two clauses; the conjunction belongs with the second clause;

ba 'but'
ke 'so, thus'
me(ke) 'and' (me is far more common in texts)
na 'or'
pude 'purposive'
tiqe 'then'

Gina tourism kamahire kote sage mae ba lopu ta-gilana.
maybe tourism now FUT go.up come but NEG PASS-know
'Maybe tourism will pick up, but we don't know.'

==== Subordination ====
Three major classes are relative clauses, complement clauses and adverbial clauses.

===== Relative clauses =====
Relative clauses follow the head N and are introduced by the invariant relative clause marker sapu. They may only be formed on A, S and O and on the argument nominal of a verbless clause. A more detailed explanation is below.

===== Complement clauses =====
Complement clauses are introduced by the subordinator sapu; otherwise, they are no different from main clauses. Complement clauses occur after verbs of cognition, speech or perception, whereas subordinate clauses (with the exception of relative clauses) occur in focus position;

Lopu hiva-ni-a ri sapu tangin-i-a rau sa vineki
NEG like-TR-3SG 3PL COMP hold-TR-3SG 1SG DEF girl
'They didn't like me holding the girl.' (lit. 'They didn't like it, that I was holding the girl.')

Complement clauses are considered to be intermediate between main and subordinate clauses. In texts, complement clauses in Roviana are rare. Direct quotation is more frequent than subordination to higher predicates of information, while epistemic modals (e.g. gina 'maybe', tu 'EMPH) are often used rather than subordination to higher predicates of cognition (ergativity).

===== Adverbial clauses =====
Adverbial clauses occur in focus position and never contain new mentions in core argument positions. They are introduced by a subordinator and followed by the focal particle si, a consequence of being in focus position;

beto 'after'
pude 'if'
totoso 'while, when'

Ke beto vagi ri sarina ⟨in⟩avoso si la buna-i-a ri sa vasina asa.
so after gather 3PL DEF:PL ⟨NOM⟩know FOC go bomb-TR-3SG 3PL DEF place that
'So after they had gathered all the information, they went and bombed that place.'

Subordination is extremely limited in Roviana. Subordinate clauses never contain other subordinate clauses, nor do they contain relative clauses. Similarly, relative clauses do not contain either subordinate clauses or relative clauses.

==== Ergativity ====
The subject of an intransitive verb has the same morphological marker as a direct object, and a different morphological marker from the subject of a transitive verb.

A – transitive subject, O – transitive direct object, S – intransitive subject, respectively.

Whether Roviana is an ergative language or not is argumentative, however; relative clauses in this language can be categorised by ergativity, so it can be described as an ergative language.

===== Relative clauses =====
Relative clauses in Roviana follow the head N and are introduced by an invariant relative marker sapu. The coreferent of the N in the matrix clause is never overt within the relative clause. This feature may be according to whether the notional coreferent within the relative clause is A, S or O.

====== Relative clauses on A ======
Relative clauses on A use clausal nominalisation. The notional A has no overt realisation. The nominalised verb in a relative clause on A carries a suffix 'NSUF', which is also used to index the possessor in possessives;

sa huda noma-na
DEF tree big-3SG.NSUF
'the big tree'

When the O in the relative clause is a proper N, it is marked with the article e;

Hierana sa koreo sapu tupa-na e Zone.
this DEF boy REL punch-3SG.NSUF ART John
'This is the boy that punched John.'

====== Relative clauses on S ======
Given that the coreferent in the relative clause does not have overt realisation;

Hierana sa tie sapu kote taloa.
this DEF man REL FUT leave
'This is the man who is going away.'

====== Relative clauses on O ======
In relative clauses on O, A is overt in the relative clause and full verbal morphology is used to index the O. The nominal suffixes are not used in relative clauses on O;

Hierana sa koreo sapu tupa-i-a e Zone.
this DEF boy REL punch-TR-3SG.DO ART John
'This is the boy that John punched.'

In the context of a relative clause which is by definition subordinate, e is glossed simply ART, since it is used with proper Ns which are A or O. These following two examples have got e; the first one is on A whereas the second one is on O.

Hierana sa koreo sapu tupa-na e Zone.
this DEF boy REL punch-3SG.NSUF ART John
'This is the boy that punched John.'

Hierana sa koreo sapu tupa-i-a e Zone.
this DEF boy REL punch-TR-3SG.DO ART John
'This is the boy that John punched.'

====== 'When' clauses ======
'When' clauses are introduced by the subordinator totoso 'time' or the syncopated form totso, but they do not specify the precise nature of the temporal relation involved;

Totso koa goi pa korapa tropic si kaqu pezaku lamo si goi.
time stay you.SG PREP inside tropic FOC must wash.hands always ABS you.SG
'When you stay in the tropics, you must always wash your hands.'

====== 'After' clauses ======
The event of an 'after' clause is introduced by the subordinator beto 'finish' and temporally precedes the event of the matrix clause to which it is syntactically subordinate;

Ke beto vag-i ri sarina ⟨in⟩avoso si la buna-i-a ri sa vasina asa.
so finish gather-TR they DEF.PL ⟨NOM⟩know FOC go bomb-TR-3SG.DO they.ERG DEF place that
'So after they had gathered all the information, they went and bombed that place.'

====== 'Contemporaneous' clauses ======
'Contemporaneous' clauses have imperfective aspect, usually accompanied by reduplication of the verb, with the meaning 'While ...-ing' or 'As ...-ing';

En-ene ri la hoirana si tutuvi-a ri se Manue.
REDUP-walk they go there FOC meet-3SG.DO they.ERG ABS Possum
'As they were walking along, they met Possum.'

====== Conditionals ======
In a conditional, the protasis is a subordinate clause. As with the subordinate clauses, there is a neutral system of case marking;

...ba pude gore vura mae sa si kote taloa si rau.
but if go.down come.out come it FOC FUT leave ABS I
'...but if it works out, I'll leave.'
