= Languages of the Solomon Islands archipelago =

- Language families of the Solomon Islands archipelago Red: North Bougainville; Blue: South Bougainville; Green: Central Solomons; Grey: Austronesian
- Official: English
- Indigenous: Several languages
- Vernacular: Pijin, Solomon Islands English
- Keyboard layout: QWERTY, US

Over 70 languages are spoken in the Solomon Islands archipelago which covers a broader area than the nation state of Solomon Islands, and includes the island of Bougainville, which is an autonomous province of Papua New Guinea (PNG). The lingua franca of the nation state of Solomon Islands is Pijin (whereas the lingua franca of Bougainville is Tok Pisin) and the official language in both countries is English.

== Language families ==
Austronesian languages

Most of the languages in the Solomon Islands archipelago are Austronesian languages, more precisely Oceanic. They belong to different language subgroups within the Oceanic family:

- Northwest Solomonic languages
- Southeast Solomonic languages
- Temotu languages
- Polynesian outliers (all of which belong to the Nuclear Polynesian group)

The Reefs – Santa Cruz languages were once thought to be non-Austronesian, but further research found them to be divergent Austronesian languages. The neighbouring languages of Vanikoro are also heavily relexified Austronesian languages. Both RSC and Vanikoro-Utupua languages are now subsumed under the Temotu subgroup of Oceanic.

An indigenous sign language, Rennellese Sign Language, has gone extinct.

Non-Austronesian languages

Besides Austronesian languages, the Central Solomon languages such as Bilua, Lavukaleve (further information in the Lavukaleve Spanish article), Savosavo and Touo constitute an independent family within the Papuan languages.

Two other language families are represented on Bougainville, which forms part of the nation of Papua New Guinea but is geographically part of the archipelago.

== Languages of the Solomon Islands archipelago ==
The following table lists 72 indigenous languages, including 66 from the Oceanic family, 4 from a “Papuan” family (Central Solomonic), as well as one Creole and one sign language.

Language	ISO 639-3 code	Speakers	% of total popⁿ	Area	Branch	Family
Pijin	pis	24,390 (lg 1); 307,000 (lg 2)	4.0689 (lg 1); 51.2162 (lg 2)		Creole	
Lungga	lga	2,767	0.4616	Ranongga	Northwest; Solomonic	Oceanic
Marovo	mvo	8,094	1.3503	New Georgia	Northwest; Solomonic	Oceanic
Mono	mte	3,337	0.5567	Shortland Is, Treasury Is	Northwest; Solomonic	Oceanic
Ririo	rri	79	0.0132	Choiseul Province	Northwest; Solomonic	Oceanic
Roviana	rug	9,871	1.6468	New Georgia	Northwest; Solomonic	Oceanic
Babatana	baa	5,600	0.9342	Choiseul Province	Northwest; Solomonic	Oceanic
Blablanga	blp	1,772	0.2956	Santa Isabel	Northwest; Solomonic	Oceanic
Cheke Holo	mrn	10,840	1.8084	Santa Isabel	Northwest; Solomonic	Oceanic
Duke	nke	2,312	0.3857	Kolombangara	Northwest; Solomonic	Oceanic
Ghanongga	ghn	2,508	0.4184	Ranongga	Northwest; Solomonic	Oceanic
Hoava	hoa	459	0.0766	New Georgia	Northwest; Solomonic	Oceanic
Kazukuru	kzk	0	0.0000	New Georgia	Northwest; Solomonic	Oceanic
Kokota	kkk	530	0.0884	Santa Isabel	Northwest; Solomonic	Oceanic
Kusaghe	ksg	2,395	0.3996	New Georgia	Northwest; Solomonic	Oceanic
Simbo	sbb	2,701	0.4506	Simbo	Northwest; Solomonic	Oceanic
Ughele	uge	1,202	0.2005	Rendova Island	Northwest; Solomonic	Oceanic
Vaghua	tva	1,960	0.3270	Choiseul Province	Northwest; Solomonic	Oceanic
Vangunu	mpr	907	0.1513	Vangunu	Northwest; Solomonic	Oceanic
Varisi	vrs	5,161	0.8610	Choiseul Province	Northwest; Solomonic	Oceanic
Gao	gga	1,215	0.2027	Santa Isabel	Northwest; Solomonic	Oceanic
Laghu	lgb	15	0.0025	Santa Isabel	Northwest; Solomonic	Oceanic
Zabana	kji	3,355	0.5597	Santa Isabel	Northwest; Solomonic	Oceanic
Zazao	jaj	10	0.0017	Santa Isabel	Northwest; Solomonic	Oceanic
ꞋAreꞌare	alu	17,800	2.9695	Malaita	Southeast; Solomonic	Oceanic
Arosi	aia	6,750	1.1261	Makira	Southeast; Solomonic	Oceanic
Baeggu	bvd	5,900	0.9843	Malaita	Southeast; Solomonic	Oceanic
Baelelea	bvc	8,800	1.4681	Malaita	Southeast; Solomonic	Oceanic
Bauro	bxa	3,420	0.5706	Makira	Southeast; Solomonic	Oceanic
Birao	brr	5,900	0.9843	Guadalcanal	Southeast; Solomonic	Oceanic
Bughotu	bgt	4,048	0.6753	Santa Isabel	Southeast; Solomonic	Oceanic
Dori'o	dor	2,406	0.4014	Malaita	Southeast; Solomonic	Oceanic
Fagani	faf	902	0.1505	Makira	Southeast; Solomonic	Oceanic
Fataleka	far	6,703	1.1182	Malaita	Southeast; Solomonic	Oceanic
Gela	nlg	11,876	1.9813	Nggela Islands	Southeast; Solomonic	Oceanic
Ghari	gri	12,119	2.0218	Guadalcanal	Southeast; Solomonic	Oceanic
Gula'alaa	gmb	1,568	0.2616	Malaita	Southeast; Solomonic	Oceanic
Kahua	agw	5,170	0.8625	Makira	Southeast; Solomonic	Oceanic
Kwaio	kwd	13,249	2.2103	Malaita	Southeast; Solomonic	Oceanic
Kwara'ae	kwf	32,433	5.4107	Malaita	Southeast; Solomonic	Oceanic
Lau	llu	16,937	2.8256	Malaita	Southeast; Solomonic	Oceanic
Lengo	lgr	13,752	2.2942	Guadalcanal	Southeast; Solomonic	Oceanic
Longgu	lgu	1,894	0.3160	Guadalcanal	Southeast; Solomonic	Oceanic
Oroha	ora	38	0.0063	Malaita	Southeast; Solomonic	Oceanic
Owa	stn	3,069	0.5120	Makira	Southeast; Solomonic	Oceanic
Sa'a	apb	11,519	1.9217	Malaita	Southeast; Solomonic	Oceanic
Talise	tlr	12,525	2.0895	Guadalcanal	Southeast; Solomonic	Oceanic
Toqabaqita	mlu	12,572	2.0974	Malaita	Southeast; Solomonic	Oceanic
Wala	lgl	6,978	1.1641	Malaita	Southeast; Solomonic	Oceanic
Malango	mln	4,135	0.6898	Guadalcanal	Southeast; Solomonic	Oceanic
Tanema	tnx	1	0.0002	Vanikoro	Temotu	Oceanic
Asubuo	aua	10	0.0017	Utupua	Temotu	Oceanic
Amba	utp	593	0.0989	Utupua	Temotu	Oceanic
Äiwoo	nfl	8,400	1.4014	Reef Islands	Temotu	Oceanic
Lovono	vnk	4	0.0007	Vanikoro	Temotu	Oceanic
Nanggu	ngr	210	0.0350	Nendö	Temotu	Oceanic
Natügu	ntu	4,280	0.7140	Nendö	Temotu	Oceanic
Nalögo	nlz	1,620	0.2703	Nendö	Temotu	Oceanic
Tanibili	tbe	15	0.0025	Utupua	Temotu	Oceanic
Teanu	tkw	800	0.1335	Vanikoro	Temotu	Oceanic
Gilbertese	gil	1,230	0.2052	Gizo, Choiseul	Micronesian	Oceanic
Rennellese	mnv	3,191	0.5323	Rennell & Bellona	Polynesian	Oceanic
Luangiua	ojv	2,367	0.3949	Ontong Java	Polynesian	Oceanic
Sikaiana	sky	731	0.1220	Sikaiana	Polynesian	Oceanic
Tikopia	tkp	3,324	0.5545	Tikopia, Vanikoro	Polynesian	Oceanic
Vaeakau-Taumako	piv	1,142	0.1905	Duff Is, Reef Is	Polynesian	Oceanic
Anuta	aud	267	0.0445	Anuta Island	Polynesian	Oceanic
Lavukaleve	lvk	1,783	0.2975	Russell Islands	Central; Solomonic	“Papuan”
Savosavo	svs	2,415	0.4029	Savo	Central; Solomonic	“Papuan”
Touo	tqu	1,874	0.3126	Rendova Island	Central; Solomonic	“Papuan”
Bilua	blb	8,740	1.4581	Vella Lavella	Central; Solomonic	“Papuan”
Rennellese Sign Language		0	0.0000	Rennell & Bellona	Home sign	

Italics indicate that a language is extinct.

== Sources ==
- François, Alexandre (2009), "The languages of Vanikoro: Three lexicons and one grammar" (PDF), in Evans, Bethwyn (ed.), Discovering history through language: Papers in honour of Malcolm Ross, Pacific Linguistics 605, Canberra: Australian National University, pp. 103–126
- Obata, Kazuko (2003). A Grammar of Bilua: a Papuan language of the Solomon Islands (PDF). Pacific Linguistics 540. Canberra: Pacific Linguistics. Research School of Pacific and Asian Studies. The Australian National University. doi:10.15144/PL-540. hdl:1885/146708. ISBN 0-85883-531-2.
- Ross, Malcolm; Næss, Åshild (2007). "An Oceanic origin for Äiwoo, the language of the Reef Islands?". Oceanic Linguistics. 46 (2): 456–498. doi:10.1353/ol.2008.0003. hdl:1885/20053.
- Tryon, Darrell T.; Hackman, Bryan D. (1983). Solomon Islands languages: an internal classification. Canberra: Pacific Linguistics. doi:10.15144/PL-C72.
  - Data set derived from Tryon & Hackman (1983): Greenhill, Simon, & Robert Forkel. (2019). lexibank/tryonsolomon: Solomon Islands Languages (Version v3.0). Zenodo. doi:10.5281/zenodo.3535809
