= Baeggu language =

Austronesian language spoken in the Solomon Islands

Baeggu
- Mbaenggu
- Native to: Solomon Islands
- Region: Malaita Island
- Native speakers: (5,900 cited 1999)
- Language family: Austronesian: Malayo-Polynesian; Oceanic; Southeast Solomonic; Malaita – San Cristobal; Malaita; Northern Malaita; Baeggu

Language codes
- ISO 639-3: bvd
- Glottolog: baeg1237

The Baeggu language (also called Baegu or Mbaenggu) is spoken by the indigenous people of the North Malaita Island in the Solomon Islands. In 1999 there were 5,900 people known to speak the language. The language is largely intelligible with Baelelea, To'aba'ita, and Lau.

== See also ==
- "Sweet Lullaby"
