= Marau Wawa language =

Austronesian language spoken in the Solomon Islands

Marau Wawa
- Native to: Solomon Islands
- Region: Marau Island
- Extinct: ca. 1930
- Language family: Austronesian: Malayo-Polynesian; Oceanic; Southeast Solomonic; Malaita – San Cristobal; San Cristobal?; Marau Wawa

Language codes
- ISO 639-3: None (mis)
- Glottolog: mara1417

Marau Wawa is an extinct language once spoken on Marau Island, off Makira in the Solomon Islands. (The island was actually named Wawa; marau just means "island".) The last speaker was old in 1919; the island had been abandoned after a raid some years earlier. The language may have been one of the Makira languages, but it was quite distinct, being unintelligible with the other language spoken near it, Bauro.
