= Malango =

Malango may refer to:

- Malango language, a Southeast Solomonic language of Guadalcanal
- Malango, Solomon Islands, a suburb of Honiara, the capital of Solomon Islands

== People with the surname ==
- Andrés Malango (born 1974), Equatoguinean footballer
- Bernard Malango (born 1943), Zambian Anglican priest
