= Sa'a =

Sa'a can refer to:

- Sa'a, Cameroon, a town in Cameroon
- Sa'a language, of the Solomon Islands
