= LGL =

LGL may refer to:

== Codes ==
- LGL, the IATA airport code for Long Lellang Airport, Long Lellang, the state of Sarawak in Malaysia
- LGL, the ICAO airline code for Luxair, the flag carrier airline of Luxembourg
- lgl, the ISO 639-3 three-letter language code for Langalanga language

== Science ==
=== Biology ===
- Large granular lymphocyte, a type of white blood cell in the immune system
- Lown–Ganong–Levine syndrome, a heart disease when the ventricles are pre-excited due to abnormal electrical communication from the atria to the ventricles

== Organizations ==
- Lycée de Garçons de Luxembourg (Luxembourg Boys' High School), a high school in Luxembourg City, Luxembourg
- Lithuanian Gay League
- Ladies Gridiron League, an Australian-based non-for-profit company running a full contact, 7-a-side, women's American football league
