= Fataleka =

Fataleka may refer to:

- Fataleka constituency, a parliamentary constituency in the Solomon Islands
- Fataleka language, a language spoken in the Solomon Islands
