= Kahua language =

Austronesian language spoken in Solomon Islands

Kahua
- Anganiwai
- Region: Solomon Islands
- Native speakers: (5,200 cited 1999)
- Language family: Austronesian: Malayo-Polynesian; Oceanic; Southeast Solomonic; Malaita – San Cristobal; San Cristobal; Kahua

Language codes
- ISO 639-3: agw
- Glottolog: kahu1241

The Kahua language is a member of the family of San Cristobal languages, and is spoken in the southern part of the island of Makira, formerly known as San Cristobal in Solomon Islands. It has also been called Anganiwai, Narihua, Wanoni.
