= Arosi language =

Austronesian language spoken in the Solomon Islands

Arosi
- Region: Makira, Solomon Islands
- Native speakers: (6,750 cited 1999)
- Language family: Austronesian: Malayo-Polynesian; Oceanic; Southeast Solomonic; Arosi

Language codes
- ISO 639-3: aia
- Glottolog: aros1241

Arosi is a Southeast Solomonic language spoken on the island of Makira. Arosi is primarily spoken by inhabitants who live to the west of the Wango River on Makira (formerly known as San Cristobal Island). Makira is in the easternmost part of the Solomon Islands. Makira was visited and named by Álvaro de Mendaña de Neira in 1588. Upon landing on Makira, the Spanish were the first to record Arosi, but only six words were initially recorded. Arosi is one of the lesser known languages in Melanesia.

== Phonology ==
Arosi distinguishes 5 vowels and 17 consonants, including the velar nasal [ŋ] and the glottal stop. Unlike many other Oceanic languages, /b/, /bʷ/, /d/, and /g/ are not nasalized. Although there is a [j] sound in Arosi, it is not distinguished in writing from the vowel /i/. The chart below shows the consonants in Arosi. For the most part, the spelling of words in Arosi is phonemic.

Arosi Consonants
		Labial		Dental	Velar	Glottal
		plain	lab.	Dental	Velar	Glottal
Nasal		m	mʷ	n	ŋ	
Stop	voiceless	p	pʷ	t	k	ʔ
Stop	voiced	b	bʷ	d	g	ʔ
Fricative				s		h
Liquid				ɾ		
Glide		w			(j)	

Sounds /k, ɡ/ can have labialized allophones [kʷ, ɡʷ] when before rounded vowels.

Arosi vowels
	Front	Back
Close	i iː	u uː
Mid	e eː	o oː
Open	a aː	

=== Syllable Structure ===
Syllables never end in a consonant; every syllable has either V or CV structure. The table below shows examples illustrating different types of syllable structure in Arosi:

Arosi Syllable Structure
Syllable type	Word in Arosi	Syllable Breakdown (Arosi)	English Meaning
V	oani	[o.a.ni]	'thus'
CV	taroha	[ta.ro.ha]	'news'
VV	aamia	[aa.mi.a]	'disturbed'

=== Word Stress ===
Arosi words can bear two types of stress:

1. Word Stress
2. Phrase/Sentence Stress

=== Word Intonation ===
Compared to English and other Western European languages, Arosi's intonation tends to waver from higher to lower tones more quickly rather than steadily increasing.

== Morphosyntax ==
Arosi sentences can be divided into two basic types: major sentences and minor sentences.

=== Major Sentences ===
Major sentences include a predicate, and at least one verb form. Major sentences can also be broken down into three categories: simple, compound, and complex. Major sentences consist of a noun phrase (NP) and verb phrase (VP). The subject of the sentence can often be broken down into these two types of phrases. Linking the two phrases (NP + VP) creates a compound sentence. Finally, complex sentences are made of compound sentences with subordinate clauses to the main phrase of the sentence.

Types of Major Sentences
Major Sentence Structures	Structure
Simple	(NP + VP)
Compound	(NP +VP) + and/but/or + (NP + VP)
Complex	(NP +VP) + and/but/or + (NP + VP) + subordinate clause

In addition to noun-phrases (NP) and verbal phrases (VP), other elements that can be added to a sentences, such as a Location (L), Time (T), or Reason (R). These complex sentences are schematized as follows:

- S → NP + VP ± L ± T
- +S + V + O ± L ± T ± R

Examples of different sentence types are presented in the table below.

Examples of major sentences
Type of Sentence Structure	Arosi sentence
S → NP + VP	e noni a boi 'A man came.'
S → NP + VP ± L ± T	e noni tewa ni heuru a boi beiau no' ai rodo 'A tall Heuru man came to me by night.'
S → NP₁ + VP + NP₂	e noni a rongoa i aoha na mawa 'A man heard the sound of the wind.'
+S + V + O ± L ± T ± R	mwani noni nai rongoa i aohana ma ra 'ai 'a 'irara i dora na uhi mai i 'ei 'The men will hear its sound and not know where it came from.'

There are three requirements for a verbal phrase in Arosi:

1. there must be a subject marker (SM),
2. the SM be made up of a morpheme, and
3. the verb follows the aspect marker.

=== Minor Sentences ===
A minor sentence does not include a predicate. Minor sentences are interjections, yes-no Sentences, as well as Equational and descriptive sentences.

==== Interjections ====
Interjections are most often verbs or nouns. When acting as an appellative, the 2nd person pronoun is used (regardless of the addition of -na). Other interjections that are commonly used are kaia 'I do not know' and bwaia 'I do not understand'.

==== Yes-No ====
The next type of minor sentence is the yes-no sentence. These are questions that can be answered with 'yes' or 'no', in Arosi io and 'ai'a, respectively. An example of a yes-no sentence is 'o tauaro? Io! 'Are you working? Yes!'.

==== Equational and Descriptive ====
he third type of minor sentence is the Equational and Descriptive sentence, which exists primarily because there is no copula (any verb "to be") in Arosi. Equational and descriptional sentences are used to show equality between two different things.

Minor Sentences
Type of Sentence Structure	Arosi example
Interjection	ai! kakarew, kokone mwatage, wauramoru! Hi, {take care}, just look, brothers! Hi just look. Take care brothers.
Yes–no question	Ia amau a hano? 'Ai'a, ia 'ai'a hano he father- you went, No, he not go Did your father go? No he did not go.
Equational and Descriptional	e taha naani? bawaa What is this? Taro; What is this? A taro.

=== Pronouns ===
In Arosi there are three forms of short pronouns. Singular, dual and plural numbers are distinguished. Pronouns in Arosi, to an extent, differ from pronouns of most other European languages. Gender is not distinguished in the third person in Arosi. Due to the non-distinguishable third-person pronoun, there is no equivalent to 'he' or 'she' in Arosi. In Arosi, pronouns also possess a dual number as well as a singular and plural. There is a distinction made in the first person non-singular between an 'inclusive' form ( we = you and I) and 'exclusive form [we = he (or they) and I]

Matrix of Arosi Pronouns
Independent		Suffixed		Separate		
Person		N. Suffix	V. Suffix	Food and Drink	V:NF	V:F
1	inau	-gu	-au	guua	nau	wai
1 + 2	igara	-garaa	-garaaa	gagaraa	gara	garai
1 + (2+)	igia	-gaa	-gaau	gagaau	ga	gai, rai
1 + 3	i' amiraia	-miria	-miria	mimiria	miri	mirii
1 + (3+)	i 'ameu	-mami	-meu	memeu	meu	meu
2	i' oe	-mu	-' o	mumua	'o	'opi
2 + 2	(a')murua	-murua	-murua	mumurua	murua	murui
(2+)	i' amou	-mou	-mou	momou	mou	moi
3	iia	-na	-a	'ana	a	ai
3 + 3	irarua	-darua	-rarua	dadareua	raru	rarui
(3+)	iraau	-da	-ra, -' i	'adaau	rau	rai

=== Tenses ===
Melanesian languages are not precise when referring to the time of an action. In Arosi, it is important to understand the "Time of Action" and the "State of Action". There are also three different tense systems in Arosi: Indefinite, past and future.

Tense System
	Indefinite	Past	Present
Time	+	+	+
Aspect	+	+	-
Sequence	+	-	+

The "+" sign in the chart shows presence while the "-" sign means the "lack of" a given form.

=== Word Classification ===
Nouns are divided into simple nouns and a phrasal nouns. The majority of words involving the naming of people or objects are simple nouns. This does not apply to names of people.

==== Simple Nouns ====
Nouns in Arosi are not classified by gender. Different types of simple nouns are presented below:

Simple Nouns in Arosi
Objects	Persons	Personal Names
hau 'stone'	noni 'man'	Uuri (m)
sina 'sun'	urao 'woman'	Rota (f)
i'a 'fish'	gare 'child'	Ianimanu (m)
raraki 'thorn'	sae 'human being'	Suari (f)

==== Phrasal Nouns ====
Unlike simple nouns, phrasal noun have two lexicons of reference. Usually, lexical components are held together by the preposition i, which can be translated as English 'of'. Sometimes, the word noni person is also used. For example, as in noni tauaro 'workman' (lit. "person work") or in hua i rumu 'oil flask, where the words are joined by 'i instead.

==== Derived Nouns ====
Compared to Malaita languages, Arosi has very few derived nouns. The primary prefixes used in Arosi are hai- and ha'i-. Some examples of these prefixes in use are presented below:

Prefixes
Prefix	Base	Derived Abstract Noun
hai-	totori- 'to hope'	haitotori 'hope (as a noun)'
ha'i-	ama- 'father'	ha'i-ama-da 'father and son'

Arosi also uses suffixes. The most commonly used suffix is -ha, which is most commonly used as a nominalizing suffix.

Suffixes
Suffix	Base	Derived abstract Noun
-ha	taro 'tell'	taroha 'news'
-ha	goro 'good'	goroha 'good condition'

=== Interrogatives ===
The following is a list of question words:

Arosi interrogatives
Question word	Examples
tei 'who'	
taha 'what'	e taha nassi? 'What is that? What sort of thing is that?'
ia tei 'who'	ia tei na boi no' a? 'Who has come?'
ira tei 'who'	ira tei rau boi no' a? 'Who has come?'
nahei 'which'	nahei ha' atora na raha 'Which is the great commandment?' (Matthew 22:36)

== Numerals ==
In the table below, there is a translation of different numbers in Arosi. Because Arosi has a base-ten numeral system, you will begin to notice a common pattern when counting numbers beyond ten. When counting, numerals are repeated then are followed by mana, or ma meaning and as well as the verb adara meaning to exceed, to go beyond. As you can see in the table, mana or ma is added between e ta’ ai tangahuru and e ta’ ai to combine the numerals for ten and one to make eleven. From 100 to 999 the same concept when counting numbers applies. The word for 1000 in Arosi is meru. Meru is the highest numeral term in Arosi. Arosi also has a distinct way of counting specific and particular items.

Numerals in Arosi
Spelling in Arosi	English Equivalent
e ta (in counting)	One
e rua	Two
e oru	Three
e hai	Four
e rima	Five
e ono	Six
e biu	Seven
e waru	Eight
e siwa	Nine
tangahuru	Ten
e ta' ai tangahuru mana e ta' ai	Eleven
e rua tangahuru	Twenty
e oru tanahuru	Thirty
e hai tangarau e rua tangahuru mana biu	Four-Hundred and Twenty-Seven
Meru	One-Thousand

== Bibliography ==
- Capell, Arthur (1971). Arosi Grammar. Series B - No. 20. Canberra: Australian National University. doi:10.15144/PL-B20. hdl:1885/146474. ISBN 0858830523. OCLC 703648.
- Fox, Charles E. (1978). Arosi Dictionary (PDF). Canberra: Pacific Linguistics. ISBN 978-0-85883-170-4.
- Lynch, John; Horoi, Rex (2002). "Arosi". In Lynch, John; Ross, Malcolm; Crowley, Terry (eds.). The Oceanic Languages. Curzon. pp. 562–572. ISBN 978-0-7007-1128-4.
- E rine nau maea; mana heiaauhi inia, ma tarai rihunai ini haagorohi (Anglican Holy Communion manual with prayers for daily use and hymns, 1955)
