= Gela language =

Austronesian language spoken in the Solomon Islands

Gela
- Nggela
- Native to: Central Solomon Islands
- Region: Big Nggela, Small Nggela, Sandfly and Buenavista Islands
- Native speakers: (12,000 cited 1999)
- Language family: Austronesian: Malayo-Polynesian; Oceanic; Southeast Solomonic; Gela–Guadalcanal; Gelic; Gela

Language codes
- ISO 639-3: nlg
- Glottolog: gela1263

Gela (English: /ˈɡeɪlɑː/ GAY-lah), also known as Nggela [ᵑgela] and formerly as Florida, is an Oceanic language spoken in the Nggela Islands, in the middle of the Solomon Islands. It belongs to the Southeast Solomonic group of the Oceanic family.

Towards the end of the 19th century, Gela was used by the Melanesian Mission of the Anglican Church of Melanesia, as a language of Christianisation ‒ along with Mota, a language of the Banks islands of northern Vanuatu. The first translation of the scriptures in Gela was published in 1882.

== Dialects ==
The three dialects of Gela are very similar, differing mainly on a small number of phonological points.

== Phonology ==
=== Phonemes ===
==== Consonants ====
Gela has the following consonant phonemes:

	Labial		Alveolar		Velar	
Nasal		m		n		ŋ
Stop	p	b	t	d	k	g
Fricative		v	s	z		ɣ
Approximant		w		l		j
Trill				r		

The fricative /z/ is realized as [ð] in alternation with a retroflex sibilant [ʐ], initially before /a/.

The Gela dominant voiced is "h" not "z". "Z" is found in Savosavo language speakers (and Bugotu and part of Guadalcanal) who also speak Gela - primarily due to their use of the Church of Melanesia Common Prayer Books and Hymns (written in Gela in the 1940s).

==== Vowels ====
Gela uses /i, e, a, o, u/ with no contrastive vowel length.

=== Stress ===
Stress generally occurs on each word's penultimate syllable.

== Sample vocabulary ==
=== Numbers ===
1. keha (keha or sakai, not keza)
2. rua
3. tolu
4. vati
5. lima
6. ono
7. vitu
8. alu
9. hiua (not hiwa)
10. hangavulu
11. hangavulu sakai
12. hangavulu rua
13. hangavulu tolu
14. hangavulu vati
15. hangavulu lima
16. hangavulu ono
17. hangavulu vitu
18. hangavulu alu
19. hangavulu hiua
20. rua hangavulu
21. rua hangavulu sakai
22. rua hangavulu rua
23. rua hangavulu tolu
24. rua hangavulu vati
25. rua hangavulu lima
26. rua hangavulu ono
27. rua hangavulu vitu
28. rua hangavulu alu
29. rua hangavulu hiua
30. tolu hangavulu
31. tolu hangavulu sakai
32. tolu hangavulu rua
33. tolu hangavulu tolu
34. tolu hangavulu vati
35. tolu hangavulu lima
36. tolu hangavulu ono
37. tolu hangavulu vitu
38. tolu hangavulu alu
39. tolu hangavulu hiua
40. vati hangavulu
41. vati hangavulu sakai
42. vati hangavulu rua
43. vati hangavulu tolu
44. vati hangavulu vati
45. vati hangavulu lima
46. vati hangavulu ono
47. vati hangavulu vitu
48. vati hangavulu alu
49. vati hangavulu hiua
50. lima hangavulu

In general, for two-digit numbers, numbers are expressed as a*10+b, where a and b are numbers ranging from 1 to 9.
