= Doriʼo language =

Austronesian language spoken in the Solomon Islands

Doriʼo
- Region: South Malaita, Solomon Islands
- Native speakers: (2,400 cited 1999)
- Language family: Austronesian: Malayo-Polynesian; Oceanic; Southeast Solomonic; Malaita – San Cristobal; Malaita; Southern; Doriʼo

Language codes
- ISO 639-3: dor
- Glottolog: dori1246

Doriʼo (also known as Kwarekwareo) is an Oceanic language of the Solomon Islands.
