= Southeast Solomonic languages =

Languages of the Solomon Islands

Southeast Solomonic
- Geographic distribution: Eastern Solomon Islands
- Linguistic classification: Austronesian: Malayo-Polynesian; Oceanic; Central–Eastern Oceanic; Southeast Solomonic
- Proto-language: Proto-Southeast Solomonic
- Subdivisions: Gela–Guadalcanal; Malaita – San Cristobal

Language codes
- Glottolog: sout2853
- Southeast Solomons

The family of Southeast Solomonic languages forms a branch of the Oceanic languages. It consists of some 26 languages covering the Eastern Solomon Islands, from the tip of Santa Isabel to Makira. It is defined by the merger of Proto-Oceanic *l and *R. The fact that there is little diversity amongst these languages, compared to groups of similar size in Melanesia, suggests that they dispersed in the relatively recent past. Bugotu, Gela and Lengo are three of the most conservative languages out of all of them.

== Languages ==
According to Lynch, Ross, & Crowley (2002), the structure of the family is as follows:

- Southeast Solomonic family
  - Bugotu–Gela–Guadalcanal family
    - Bughotu (Bugotu)
    - Gela–Guadalcanal family
      - Gelic: Lengo, Gela
      - Guadalcanalese: Birao, Ghari, Malango, Talise
  - Longgu–Malaita–Makira family
    - Longgu
    - Malaita–Makira family
      - Saʼa
      - Makiran (San Cristobal): Arosi, Fagani, Bauro, Kahua–Owa, ?Marau Wawa
      - Malaitan
        - Central–North Malaitan: North (Toʼabaita, Baelelea, Baeggu, Fataleka), Lau, Kwaraʼae, Wala, Gulaʼalaa, Kwaio, Doriʼo
        - Southern Malaitan: ꞋAreꞌare, Marau, Oroha

== Basic vocabulary ==
Basic vocabulary in many Southeast Solomonic languages is somewhat conservative, unlike Northwest Solomonic forms, many of which have no Proto-Oceanic cognates. Below, Lengo and Arosi are compared with three Northwest Solomonic languages. Aberrant forms are in bold.

English	arm	ear	liver	bone	skin	louse
Proto-Oceanic	*lima	*taliŋa	*qate	*suRi	*kulit	*kutu
Ririo	**karisi**	**ŋgel**	**tutuen**	**punda**	**kapat**	utu
Zabana	**kame**	taliŋa	**kola**	**huma**	**kafu**	gutu
Maringe	lima	**khuli**	**khebu**	**knubra**	guli	**theli**
Lengo	lima	**kuli**	ate	thuli	ghui-ghuli	ghutu
Arosi	rima	kariŋa	**rogo**	su-suri	ʔuri-ʔuri	kote
