= Birao language =

Austronesian language spoken in the Solomon Islands

Birao
- Native to: Solomon Islands
- Region: Guadalcanal
- Native speakers: (5,900 cited 1999)
- Language family: Austronesian: Malayo-Polynesian; Oceanic; Southeast Solomonic; Gela–Guadalcanal; Guadalcanal; Birao

Language codes
- ISO 639-3: brr
- Glottolog: bira1254

Birao (Mbirao) is a Southeast Solomonic language of Guadalcanal.
