= Gulaʼalaa language =

Austronesian language spoken in the Solomon Islands

Gulaʼala
- Kwai
- Native to: Malaita, Solomon Islands
- Region: Kwai and Ngongosila islands
- Native speakers: (1,600 cited 1999)
- Language family: Austronesian: Malayo-Polynesian; Oceanic; Southeast Solomonic; Malaita – San Cristobal; Malaita; Northern Malaita; Gulaʼala

Language codes
- ISO 639-3: gmb
- Glottolog: gula1270

The Gulaʼala language is spoken just off Malaita Island in the Solomon Islands.
