= Rennellese Sign Language =

Extinct home sign language of Rennell Island

- Native to: Solomon Islands
- Region: Rennell Island
- Extinct: ca. 2000
- Language family: none (home sign)

Language codes
- ISO 639-3: (rsi deprecated in 2017 due to spurious)
- Glottolog: renn1236
- ELP: Rennell Island Sign Language

Rennellese Sign Language is an extinct form of home sign documented from Rennell Island in the Solomon Islands in 1974. It was developed about 1915 by a deaf person named Kagobai and used by his hearing family and friends, but apparently died with him; he was the only deaf person on the island, and there never was an established, self-replicating community of signers. Accordingly, in January 2017 its ISO 639-3 code [rsi] was retired. Rolf Kuschel, the only source of information about this communication system, cites no evidence to suggest that there was any contact with any sign language.
