= Lengo language =

Austronesian language spoken in the Solomon Islands

Lengo
- Native to: Solomon Islands
- Region: Guadalcanal
- Native speakers: (14,000 cited 1999)
- Language family: Austronesian: Malayo-Polynesian; Oceanic; Southeast Solomonic; Gela–Guadalcanal; Gelic; Lengo

Language codes
- ISO 639-3: lgr
- Glottolog: leng1259

Lengo or informally known as "Doku" is an Oceanic language spoken on the island of Guadalcanal. It belongs to the Southeast Solomonic language family.

== Phonology ==
=== Vowels ===
Lengo has 6 vowels.

	Front	Back
Close	i	u
Close-Mid	e	o
Open-Mid	ɛ	
Open		ɑ

Vowel sequences occur commonly for all combinations of these vowels, with the exception of /uo/. The front open-mid vowel /ɛ/ never occurs in sequence.

=== Consonants ===
Lengo has 15 consonants.

	Labial	Coronal	Velar
Nasal	m	n	ŋ
(prenasalized) Plosive	ᵐb	ⁿd	ᵑɡ
(prenasalized) Plosive	p	t	k
Spirant	β	ð	ɣ
Sibilant		s	
Trill		r	
Lateral		l	

Voiced stops are prenasalized. Two instances of regional variation in these phonemes have been observed. These are /β/ becoming /v/, and /ð/ becoming /z/.

== Syntax ==
Lengo, nowadays uses the SVO or Subject-verb-object word order

== Morphology ==
=== Pronominal systems ===
Lengo has five sets of pronominal forms. These are emphatic, subject reference, object, direct possessor, and indirect possessor. These distinguish maximally between four persons (first person inclusive and exclusive, second, and third person), and four numbers (singular, plural, dual, and paucal). There is no grammatical gender distinction, but there is an animacy distinction in the object paradigm. Two further uses of these pronominal forms occur - a reflexive pronoun, and a set of interrogative pronouns.

The dual and paucal forms are derived from the plural forms by the addition of ko- and tu- respectively. The dual forms are used only to indicate 'two and only two', whilst the plural and paucal forms mean 'two or more' and 'three or more' respectively. First person exclusive excludes the addresse(s).

==== Emphatic pronouns ====
The emphatic pronoun in Lengo is optional, and can occur in combination with obligatory pronouns that may occur with subject or object function. It can also appear without other pronouns. It is used to emphasize the semantic role of a noun in a clause.

		Singular	Plural	Dual	Paucal
1st	exclusive	inau	ighami	i-ko-ghami	i-tu-ghami
1st	inclusive	inau	ighita	i-ko-ghita	i-tu-ghita
2nd		ighoe	ighami	i-ko-ghamu	i-tu-ghamu
3rd		ga-ia/aia	ga-ira/a-ira	i-ko-ira	i-tu-ira

Examples:

ara gito-a t-i m-ara lavi dea-a na kei-gu inau
3PL steal-o:3SG REAL-LOC CONJ-3PL take go-o:3SG ART basket-PS:1SG EP:1SG
"They stole it and they took it away my basket - mine."

ara-ko gara iti-a na thinaghe i-ko-ira m-u ghe tapa inau
3PL-DU pull up-o:3SG ART canoe DU.EP:3PL CONJ-1SG continue run EP:1SG
"they two pulled up the canoe and I continued to run."

==== Subject reference pronouns ====
The subject reference pronoun appears as the first element in a verb phrase. It is obligatory in any main clause, but can be excepted in subordinate clauses. It is optional in imperative sentences.

		Singular	Plural	Dual	Paucal
1st	exclusive	u	ami	ami-ko	ami-tu
1st	inclusive	u	a	a-ko	a-tu
2nd		o	amu	amu-ko	amu-tu
3rd		e	ara	ara-ko	ara-tu

Example:

i-ko-ghami a P. ami-ko dea i nughu.
DU:EP:1PL.EXCL ART P. 1PL.EXCL-DU go LOC river
"We two, P. and I, we two went to the river."

==== Object pronouns ====
The object form in Lengo is identified using a set of pronominal suffixes, which index the object arguments on the verb. In instances where a verb takes both a direct and indirect object, only the indirect object is marked. The third person plural object form is marked for animate or inanimate objects.

		Singular	Plural	Dual	Paucal
1st	exclusive	-u	-ghami	-ko-ghami	-tu-ghami
1st	inclusive	-u	-ghita	-ko-ghita	-tu-ghita
2nd		-gho	-ghamu	-ko-ghamu	-tu-ghamu
3rd		-a	-ra (animate), -i (inanimate)	-ko-ira	-tu-ira

Example:

ara pitu-u
3PL wait-o:1SG
"They await me."

==== Direct possessor pronouns ====
The direct possessor form is used for inalienably possessed nouns. It is a suffix on the possessed noun that indicates the possessor. In the case of the dual and paucal forms, number is indicated as a prefix on the noun, and the plural form of the possessive suffix is used.

		Singular	Plural	Dual	Paucal
1st	exclusive	-gu	-mami	ko- -mami	tu- -mami
1st	inclusive	-gu	-da	ko- -da	tu- -da
2nd		-mu	-miu	ko- -miu	tu- -miu
3rd		-e, -na	-dira	ko- -dira	tu- -dira

The third person singular direct possessor appears in two forms, with '-e' being more prevalent than '-na'.

Examples:

na vae-gu
ART house-PS:1SG
"My house."

A ko-dae-mami e belo
ART DU-child-PL:1PL.EXCL 3SG ring.bell
"our two's child is ringing the bell."

==== Indirect possessor pronouns ====
The indirect possessor form is used for alienably possessed nouns. It occurs as a free morpheme preceding the possessed noun. There are two categories distinguished - 'oral consumable' and 'general'. The oral consumable category includes items that are able to be eaten, drunk, or consumed via the mouth, such as tobacco.

	General				Oral consumable			
	1st Inclusive	1st Exclusive	2nd	3rd	1st Inclusive	1st Exclusive	2nd	3rd
Singular	ni-gu-a		ni-mu-a	ne	gha-gu-a		gha-mu-a	ghe
Plural	no-da	ni-mami	ni-miu	no-dira	gha-da	gha-mami	gha-miu	gha-dira
Dual	ko-no-da	ko-ni-mami	ko-ni-miu	ko-no-dira	ko-gha-da	ko-gha-mami	ko-gha-miu	ko-gha-dira
Paucal	tu-no-da	tu-ni-mami	tu-ni-miu	tu-no-dira	tu-gha-da	tu-gha-mami	tu-gha-miu	tu-gha-dira

Oral consumable form:

gha-mu-a na vudi lepa
oral.CLF-PS:2SG-O:3SG ART banana ripe
"[Here is a] ripe banana for you to eat."

General form:

ne na be Ghaua.
PS:3SG ART pig Ghaua
"Ghaua's pig."

==== Reflexive pronouns ====
A reflexive pronoun is composed when a direct possessor suffix is added to the stem 'tibo'. This results in a valency decrease of the verb.

Examples:

u toka tibo-gu.
1SG cut REFL-PS:1SG
"I cut myself."

u toka na ghai
1SG cut ART tree
"I cut the tree."

==== Interrogative and relative pronouns ====
Lengo has two pronouns that have interrogative or relative uses. 'thei' is used if the reference is human, and 'tha' if the reference is non-human.

Relative use:

na tinoni ketha a thei ga deni ba k-e mai lavi-a pile-a na vanga de
ART person different ART REL there DEM FUT IRR-3SG come take-o:3SG little.bit-o:3SG ART food DEM
"a different person who is over there will come take a bit of this food."

Interrogative use:

na tha t-o ghali-a
ART INT REAL-3SG do-o:3SG
"What are you doing?"

== Negation ==
There are several ways to indicate negation in Lengo.

There is the discontinuous morpheme mua 'NEG', which surrounds the verb being negated. There are three modals which can appear in the serial verb construction and are negative (taigha), prohibitive (tabu) or non-volitive (kou). Lastly, there is the auxiliary boro 'impossible FUT', which is sometimes glossed as 'NEG' and can negate the verb.

The mua... mua 'NEG ... NEG' structure can also be combined with taigha 'NEG' to create a double negative, which carries the meaning of a strong affirmative.

=== Discontinuous morpheme mua ... mua ===
The grammatical negator, the mua... mua 'NEG ... NEG' structure, is the only instance of a 'discontinuous' morpheme in Lengo. The morpheme mua appears both before and after the verb being negated. The basic structure of this construction is mua V mua, as seen in (13) and (14):

Mua ole mua.
NEG walk NEG
'Don't walk.'

Mua thaghata leo mua.
NEG bad inside NEG
'Don't worry.'

A variant of this construction is mo ... moa, as seen in (15).

ko mua lubathia moa pe dea
2SG NEG let.3SG NEG or.3SG go
'Don't let it out (release it) or it will run away.'

Note that although all examples presented by Unger show mua ... mua 'NEG ... NEG' used for a negative imperative, it should not be assumed that this construction is exclusive to a particular sentence structure. More examples are needed for a satisfactory conclusion.

Regardless, mua ... mua is an uncommon negator in Lengo. Much more frequently used is the modal taigha 'NEG'.

=== Modals ===
Lengo has a 'serial verb construction'. The various types of serial verb construction identified are directional, sequential, causative, manner, ambient, comitative, dative, instrumental and modal. The basic structure of a modal serial verb construction is as follows:

V + na V(-O)

The first verb is the modal verb, and the second verb follows an article (always na). This second verb is treated somewhat like an infinitive. Lengo has five modal verbs; of these, three are used to create negative constructions. These three are:

Modal	Meaning
taigha	negative
tabu	prohibitive
kou	non-volitive

==== Negative taigha ====
Of all the ways to express negation in Lengo, the modal taigha 'NEG' is the most versatile and often used. It can be used to negate verbs in statements, like in (16):

ami-ko taigha na ta~tavu thae-a na kei
1PL.EXCL-DU NEG ART REDUP~find 'arrive.at'-o:3SG ART basket
'we didn't find the basket'

In (17) and (18), taigha appears at the very beginning of the serial verb construction, and the realis locative t-i appears between the negator and the article na. The entire serial verb construction is negated by taigha.

Ba k-u taigha t-i na mono varongo i vanua.
FUT IRR-1SG NEG REAL-LOC ART stay quiet LOC village
'I really won't be sitting around in the village.'

E taigha t-i na mono varongo!
3SG NEG REAL-LOC ART stay quiet
'He simply cannot be still!'

Sometimes the construction taigha na undergoes elision and is shortened to tai'na, note that the apostrophe exerted here is not a glottal stop but is merely an indicator to know that the word comes from the two root words taigha and na an example of this is in (19):

"amitai'na {} talamaghi," ge tara bosa
PFV-1PL.EXCL NEG ART agree EP:1PL.EXCL
'"we don't agree," they said'

This shortened form tai'na 'NEG' should not be confused with tai'na 'LOC'. Refer to example (20), which shows both homophones in use: the first being the locative and the second (bolded) being the combined modal and article.

ge po tu tangomana ni tugui tana bona deni. E tai'na tuaghai. Gaia po. Lakatoba.
DEM LIM 1SG able PREP story-o:3SG LOC time DEM EP:3SG NEG ART long EP:3SG thank.you
'That just the story I am able of telling at this time. It's not long. That's it. Thank you.'

Taigha is flexible and can be used to create negative polar questions and answer polar questions, as in examples (21), (22) and (23).

Example (21) is a negative polar question which can be answered with either eo 'yes' or taigha 'no'. Answering with eo would mean 'yes, I have not seen your basket', whereas answering with taigha would mean 'no, I have seen it'.

In example (22), taigha is used to answer a polar question in the negative. In (23), taigha is modified by an adverbial, vata 'yet'.

o taigha na bere na kei-gu?
2SG NEG ART see ART basket-PS:1SG
'you haven't seen my basket?'

O bo dea i leghai? Taigha.
2SG IPFV go LOC garden NEG
'Are you going to the garden?' 'No.'

A P. t-e mai? Taigha vata.
ART P REAL-3SG come NEG continue
'Has P. come?' 'Not yet.'

In (24), o taigha 'or NEG' is added to the end of the sentence to create an alternative question.

Ba k-o dea pa taigha?
FUT IRR-2SG go or NEG
'Are you going or not?'

A content question can also be answered with taigha, as in (25).

E ngitha na igha t-o lavi? Taigha.
3SG how.many ART fish REAL-2SG take NEG
'How many fish did you catch?' 'None.'

==== Prohibitive tabu ====
The word tabu 'prohibitive (with consequences); forbidden' is another common way of forming a negative. It is often used by parents who are correcting their children. As with taigha 'no/none', a clause could consist of the single word Tabu! 'Don't!' The basic structure is the same as with other modals: the first verb is the modal, and it is followed by the article na and the second verb.

In (26), the consequence of disobeying is explicitly addressed. In (27), the article na is omitted, and the consequence of 'or else ...' is implied.

Tabu na lavi-a na ghau: bo-e ghado-gho
NEG ART grab-o:3SG ART knife APPR-3SG pierce-o:2SG
'Don't grab the knife: no good it cuts you!'

Tabu le~leu!
NEG REDUP~fight
'Don't fight!'

==== Non-volitive kou ====
The third and last negative modal is kou 'refuse', which is used to indicate non-volition. It appears in the same place as taigha and tabu, but carries a more specific meaning.

In example (28), if the more general taigha 'NEG' had been used instead of kou, it would simply mean that the fish do not eat the bait. However, in (28), the fish not only do not eat the bait, but they will not.

Example (29) has the words laka 'also' and t-i 'REAL-LOC' in between the negator and the article na.

Kou na vanga na igha.
NEG ART eat ART fish
'The fish are unwilling to eat [the bait].'

Ma na tha laka, e kou laka t-i na lighu-ni-a ghini-a igha deni m-e ghe laka po t-i tena maone.
CONJ ART REL also 3SG NEG also REAL-LOC ART pass-TR-o:3SG INST-o:3SG fish DEM CONJ-3SG continue also LIM REAL-LOC LOC sand
'And what's more, it [the fish] was unwilling to be passed by him [the turtle] so this fish also just continued onto the sand.'

=== Auxiliary boro ===
In Lengo, tense auxiliaries appear before the subject reference pronoun and verb. There are two tense auxiliaries: bo 'FUT' and boro 'impossible FUT'. While boro is perhaps not a straightforward example of negation, it nevertheless does carry a meaning of 'negation for a reason'. If tabu is specifically prohibitive and kou is specifically non-volitive, then boro can be presented as a negator denoting impossibility. Furthermore, it is sometimes glossed as NEG, as in (30):

Boro k-e ghe dea tena group sakai, boro tana group ruka, ba k-e masi ba oli ba tena nimiu na thara tibo-miu t-i ighamu na K.
NEG IRR-3SG continue go LOC group one NEG LOC group two FUT IRR-3SG must FUT return FUT LOC PS:2PL ART feast.row REFL-PS:2PL REAL-LOC EP:2PL ART K‍
'It cannot go to group one, it cannot go to group two; it must return to your feast row—yourselves [group] K.'

Example (31) shows boro glossed as 'impossible'. However, it still has the effect of negating the verb.

pukua na thara deni boro k-a tovothi thudu
because ART feast DEM impossible IRR-1PL.INCL separate sit
'because at this feast it will be impossible for us to sit separate'

=== Double negative construction ===
The modal taigha 'NEG can be combined with the mua ... mua 'NEG ... NEG' structure to create a double negative, which carries the meaning of a strong affirmative, as in (32). However, this construction (meaning 'must') is rarely used. Instead, the Pijin form masi 'must', a borrowing from English, is much more common.

Example (33) shows the same sentence as (32), but without either of the negation structures. This example is a simple imperative.

k-o mo ghe teigha mo na mai
IRR-2SG NEG continue NEG NEG ART come
'you must come' (lit. 'you must'nt not come')

k-o ghe mai
IRR-2SG continue come
'you, continue coming'

== Abbreviations ==
The following is a list of all the abbreviations used in this article.

1	first person
2	second person
3	third person
APPR	apprehensive
ART	article
CLF	classifier
CONJ	conjunction
DEM	demonstrative
DU	dual
EP	emphatic pronoun
EX	exclusive
FUT	future
IPFV	imperfective
INST	instrumental
INT	interrogative
IRR	irrealis
LIM	limiter
LOC	locative
o/O	object
PFV	perfective
PL	plural
PS	possessor pronoun / person
REDUP	reduplication
REAL	realis
REFL	reflexive
REL	relative pronoun
SG	singular
TR	transitivitiser
