= Ghari language =

Austronesian language spoken in the Solomon Islands

Ghari
- Gari
- Region: Guadalcanal, Solomon Islands
- Native speakers: (12,000 cited 1999)
- Language family: Austronesian: Malayo-Polynesian; Oceanic; Southeast Solomonic; Gela–Guadalcanal; Guadalcanal; Ghari
- Dialects: 7,100 Ghari; 3,000 Ndi (Vaturanga); 950 Gae (Nggae, Qae); 550 Tandai-Nggaria (Tanaghai); 490 Nginia; Geri (Nggeri)

Language codes
- ISO 639-3: gri
- Glottolog: ghar1239

Ghari (also known as Gari, Tangarare, Sughu, and West Guadalcanal) is an Oceanic language spoken on Guadalcanal island of the Solomon Islands.

The Vaturanga dialect has been used extensively in missionary and liturgical translations, leading linguist Arthur Capell to describe it as a mission/ecclesiastical language.

== Phonology ==
The following is the Qae dialect:

=== Consonants ===
		Labial	Alveolar	Palatal	Velar	Glottal
Nasal		m	n		ŋ ⟨ng⟩	
Stop/ Affricate	voiceless	p	t	tʃ^{[a]} ⟨j⟩	k	
Stop/ Affricate	prenasal	ᵐb ⟨b⟩	ⁿd ⟨d⟩	ᶮdʒ^{[b]} ⟨z⟩	ᵑɡ ⟨ngg⟩	
Fricative		β ⟨v⟩	s		ɣ ⟨h⟩	(h)^{[c]}
Lateral			l			
Rhotic			r			

^{[a]}/ⁿt͡s/ in other dialects

^{[b]}/ⁿd͡z/ in other dialects

^{[c]}[h] can be heard as a variation of /ɣ/ across dialects.

Where it differs from the IPA, the orthography is written in angular brackets (<>).

=== Vowels ===
	Front	Central	Back
High	i		u
Mid	e		o
Low		a	
