= Fagani language =

Austronesian language spoken in the Solomon Islands

Fagani
- Region: Solomon Islands
- Native speakers: (900 cited 1999)
- Language family: Austronesian: Malayo-Polynesian; Oceanic; Southeast Solomonic; Malaita – San Cristobal; San Cristobal; Fagani
- Dialects: Rihu'a; Agufi

Language codes
- ISO 639-3: faf
- Glottolog: faga1239
- ELP: Fagani
- Fagani is classified as Vulnerable by the UNESCO Atlas of the World's Languages in Danger.

The Phagani or Phaghani language is a member of the family of San Cristobal languages, and is spoken in the northwest part of the island of Makira, formerly known as San Cristobal, in the Solomon Islands.
