= Kwaio language =

Austronesian language spoken in the Solomon Islands

Kwaio
- Koio, Welakau, Fataia
- Pronunciation: [kʷaio]
- Native to: Solomon Islands
- Region: Malaita Island
- Ethnicity: Kwaio people
- Native speakers: 22,400 (2025)
- Language family: Austronesian: Malayo-Polynesian; Oceanic; Southeast Solomonic; Malaita – San Cristobal; Malaita; Northern; Kwaio
- Dialects: Xwaio; Kwareuna; Siesie
- Writing system: Latin script

Language codes
- ISO 639-3: kwd
- Glottolog: kwai1243

The Kwaio language, also called Koio, Welakau or Fataia, is an Austronesian language spoken in the centre of Malaita in the Solomon Islands. It is spoken by about 22,400 people.

== Phonology ==
The phonology of the Kwaio language includes 5 vowels and 18 consonants (including the glottal stop), which are shown below.

Vowels
| | Front | Central | Back |
|---|---|---|---|
| Close | i | | u |
| Mid | e | | o |
| Open | | a | |

Consonants
| | | Labial | Alveolar | Velar | | Glottal |
| | | Labial | Alveolar | plain | labialized | Glottal |
|---|---|---|---|---|---|---|
| Nasal | | m | n | ŋ | ŋʷ | |
| Plosive | voiced | b | d | g | gʷ | |
| Plosive | voiceless | | t | k | kʷ | ʔ |
| Fricative | | f | s | (x) | (xʷ) | |
| Liquid | | | l (r) | | | |
| Semivowel | | | | | w | |

The labialised velars (gw, kw, and ŋw) only occur when preceding vowels /a, e, i/. Sounds /k, kʷ/ may be heard as fricatives [x, xʷ] in the Sinalagu dialect. The phoneme /l/ is pronounced [l] when preceding low vowels /a, o, e/ but [r] when preceding high vowels /i, u/. This distinction is shown in the orthography. For example, lafa, lefu, lofo are pronounced with [l], but riu and ruma are pronounced with [r]. Voiced sounds are prenasalized [ᵐb, ⁿd, ᵑɡ, ᵑɡʷ] mainly in intervocalic position.

=== Syllables ===
In the Kwaio language the bases are usually formed using stings of CVCV, but CVV, VCV, and VV appear because the consonants are sometimes dropped. There are no consonant clusters (CC), and all syllables are open, so they end in a vowel.

==== Stress ====
When the same vowel appears twice in a row (in the form CVV or VV), the vowels act as separate syllables. Within morphemes, the stress is typically placed on the second-to-last vowel. When suffixes are attached to bases, the stress shifts to the second-to-last vowel according to this rule.

One exception is when a verb is in the form CVV and a monosyllabic pronoun is attached to it as a suffix, in which case the stress does not move. For example, the verb fai 'scratch' is stressed on the [a], but in the suffixed form fai-a 'scratch it' the stress remains with the first [a] and does not move to the [i].

=== Reduplication ===
In Kwaio, full and partial reduplication commonly occurs. It happens when showing the passage of time; to emphasize the meaning of an adjective (siisika 'very small'); to show continuous, prolonged, or repeated action in verbs (bonobono 'completely closed'); or to indicate plurality in nouns (rua niinimana 'two arms').

=== Glottal stop deletion ===
The glottal stop is often omitted in the Kwaio language when there are successive syllables that use the glottal stop. This happens across the word boundary if one word ends in -V'V and the next starts 'V-, which will then be pronounced as VV'V (instead of V'V'V), i.e., one of the glottal stops is dropped. An example of this is te'e + 'ola → tee'ola.

== Morphology ==
Similar to other Melanesian languages, Kwaio uses two morphological classes: bases and particles. More complex forms can be made by modifying bases by adding affixes (prefixes, suffixes, or infixes) or by conjoining bases. Particles attach to bases and show the relationship between phrases and clauses. The bases follow the syllable pattern CVCV, CVV or VCV.

=== Possessive Nouns ===
Similar to other languages on Malaita, the Kwaio language does not show possession of food and drinks, but it adds the possessive particle a-, e.g. 'ifi a-gu 'my house'. To show alienable possession, Kwaio uses fue nua which translates to 'my namesake'. Nouns are not strictly alienable or inalienable, instead the possession forms a semantic relationship between nouns. Possession must be looked at with a wider scope to establish where the possession belongs as nouns may be possessed differently using markers.

=== Individual and Mass Nouns ===
If an inanimate noun is countable, it can be quantified by either a number or ni, which is a plural article. For example, in ni 'ai 'trees' the noun 'ai 'tree' is marked by the plural article. ni or numerals cannot be used when a noun is uncountable or a mass object. For example, one 'sand' refers to a mass substance, so *ni one is ungrammatical. Yet, certain mass nouns can be quantified with an additional measure word, e.g. in oru foo'i one 'three grains of sand' the measure word foo'i 'grains' is used to quantify one 'sand'.

=== Pronouns ===
There are 15 personal pronouns in Kwaio, covering four number categories (singular, dual, trial, and plural) and four persons (first inclusive, first exclusive, second and third). The language also distinguishes focal and referencing pronoun. The pronouns are shown in the table below. The vowels in parentheses are optional vowel lengthening.

Kwaio Pronouns
| Number | Person | Focal Pronoun | Referencing Pronoun | Gloss |
|---|---|---|---|---|
| Singular | first | (i)nau | ku | "I" |
| Singular | second | (i)'oo | [ko] ['oi] | "you" |
| Singular | third | ngai(a) | [ka] [e] | "he, she, it" |
| Dual | first incl. | ('i)da'a | golo (guru) | "you two" |
| Dual | first excl. | ('e)me'e | mele (miru) | "we two (excl.)" |
| Dual | second | ('o)mo'o | molo | "you two" |
| Dual | third | ('i)ga'a | gala | "they two" |
| Trial | first incl. | ('i)dauru | goru | "we three (incl.)" |
| Trial | first excl. | ('e)meeru | meru | "we three (excl.)" |
| Trial | second | ('o)mooru | moru | "you three" |
| Trial | third | ('i)gauru | garu | "they three" |
| Plural | first incl. | gia | ki | "we (incl.)" |
| Plural | first excl. | ('i)mani | mi | "we (excl.)" |
| Plural | second | ('a)miu | mu | "you" |
| Plural | third | gila | (gi)la | "they" |

=== Verbs ===
Verbs in Kwaio fall into two categories: active verbs, which describe actions, and stative verbs, which describe states. Active verbs can be broken up into two more categories, namely transitive and intransitive verbs. The verbs can generally be distinguished by the relationship with noun phrases that are in the sentence or clause.

== Syntax ==
Sentences in Kwaio either have verbal predicates or do not. If a sentence has a verbal predicate, a comprising declarative, or is an interrogative sentence, it follows an SVO word order. Phrases in Kwaio include noun phrases, verb phrases, prepositional phrases, and temporal phrases. Sentences that do not have a verbal predicate include sentences that are equational and locative. Types of sentences include declarative verbal sentences, stative verbal sentences, and verbless declarative sentences. Questions have no special morphological marking but are indicated with intonation contours. The passage of time can be represented with reduplication and repetition, as in eeleka leeleka leeleka ma la age no'o i mae-na 'He ran away into the forest and [after a long while] they gave the feast for his death', where the verb leka 'go' is reduplicated and repeated.
