= Toʼabaita language =

Malaita language of the Solomon Islands

Toqabaqita
- Toʼabaita
- Maluʼu
- Native to: Solomon Islands
- Region: Malaita Island
- Native speakers: (13,000 cited 1999)
- Language family: Austronesian: Malayo-Polynesian; Oceanic; Southeast Solomonic; Malaita – San Cristobal; Malaita; Northern Malaita; Toqabaqita

Language codes
- ISO 639-3: mlu
- Glottolog: toab1237

A To'abaita speaker, recorded in the Solomon Islands.

Toʼabaita, also known as Toqabaqita, Toʼambaita, Malu and Maluʼu, is a language spoken by the people living at the north-western tip of Malaita Island, of South Eastern Solomon Islands. Toʼabaita is an Austronesian language.

== Name ==
Based on Lichtenberk's grammar, the name Toqabaqita literally means "many people":

toqa + baqita
"person" {} {"big, many"}

== Overview ==
The website Ethnologue records the number of speakers of Toqabaqita as 12,600 in 1999. Lichtenberk, who has written an extensive grammar of Toqabaqita reports that Toqabaqita may be part of a North Malaita group of dialects which includes Baeguu, Baelelae and Fataleka, and possibly Lau. Ethnologue however reports no known dialects of Toqabaqita, but reports that within this group of languages, they are mutually intelligible. Lichtenberk points out that the speakers of Toqabaqita do recognize similarities across the whole island's languages, but the Toqabaqita people themselves do not have this conception of North Malaita being a language and Toqabaqita as a dialect within this group.

Toqabaqita is classified as member of the Malayo-Polynesian, Oceanic, Central-Eastern Oceanic, Southeast Solomonic language family. Then there is a slight divergence in classification between Lichtenberk and Glottolog. Lichetenberk classifies the next subgrouping as Longgu/Malaita/Makira (San Cristobal), whereas Glottolog does not include Longgu at this point, but instead as a sister subgroup to Malaita/Makira.

The Wikipedia entry for Longgu, which is a Southeast Solomonic language spoken on Guadalcanal, is reported to be originally from Malaita. Lichtenberg then breaks the Malaita/Makira subgroup into the Central/Northern and Southern Malaita subgroups, then North Malaita subgroup itself, to which Toqabaqita belongs. In contrast Glottolog breaks the subgroup Malaita/ San Cristobal (Makira) into two subgroups Malaita/Makira and Longgu, then to North and south Malaita subgroups, where the north includes the above listed putative dialects as well as the central Malaita languages. The number of speakers of Toqabaqita is relatively high for a Solomon Islands language, although most speakers become bilingual in Pijin as they grow up. Toqabaqita has the status of first language for children, and is used in daily life. Many Toqabaqita speakers also speak some English, and this is the language of the schools, although only primary schools are available locally. The literacy rate in Toqabaqita is 30-60%, and Latin script is used.

== Language Typology ==
Toqabaqita has as its basic constituent order Subject - Predicate – X, with X referring to other elements than the subject and predicate. This can also be categorized as SVO (subject verb object) and SVX (subject verb other). Lynch in his review of Oceanic languages found that this constituent order is in fact the most widely geographically distributed pattern.

Verbs in Toqabaqita can include a variety of affixes, both suffixes and prefixes, which mark other grammatical categories of tense aspect, sequentiality and negation. Lexical objects are usually indexed on the verb as a suffix. In Toqabaqita the basic noun phrase consists minimally of a noun or an independent personal pronoun. Noun phrases may contain modifiers, which are generally suffixes.

Lexical morphemes consist of at least two syllables in Toqabaqita. Where a monosyllabic word occurs, such as a grammatical morpheme, it then attaches as a clitic to the preceding word, with some notable exceptions. If speech is slow then the grammatical morpheme may have its vowel lengthened and take stress.

== Phonology ==
Toqabaqita phonemes consist of 17 consonants and 5 vowels.

Consonant phonemes
		Bilabial	Interdental	Dental	Velar	Labial-velar	Glottal
Nasal		m		n	ŋ		
Plosive	voiceless			t	k	k͡p	ʔ
Plosive	voiced	b		d	g	g͡b	
Fricative		ɸ	θ	s			
Approximant						w	
Lateral				l			
Trill				r			

/k͡p/ and /g͡b/ are doubly-articulated voiceless and voiced labial–velar stop consonants. Pre-nasalization is a feature of particular Toqabaqita consonants, including all the voiced plosives, that is /b/, /d/, /g/ and /g͡b/, and for the glide /w/ . The degree of prenasalization varies and is determined by their position in the word.

Vowel Phonemes
	front	central	back
close	ɪ		ʊ
open-mid	ɛ		ɔ
open		a	

Vowels can be short or long, but adjacent vowels cannot both be long.

== Personal Pronouns and Person Markers ==
=== Independent Personal Pronouns ===
The Independent person pronouns in Toqabaqita are for single, dual and plural pronouns for first person exclusive, first person inclusive, second and third person categories. With only a few systematic exceptions the pronominal noun phrases are used in the same position as where a lexical noun phrase would occur. Lexical nouns are marked only as singular or plural in Toqabaqita.

nau ku thathami-a koro koki
1SG 1SG.NFUT want-3.OBJ DU(INCL) DU(INCL).FUT
"I want the two of us to eat."

kamiliqa kori-a fau rafu
1PL(EXCL) scrape-3.OBJ stone sea.cucumber.sp
"We scrape limestone..."

The variants in the table marked with (1) were used exclusively by women. Of these pronouns used only by women, only the first person inclusive plural pronoun kia is used at the present time. This is specifically in the context of referring to one's home, or one's home place or one's country most commonly when away from one's home area. It is notable that although there are multiple plural personal pronouns some are used more commonly than others. Some alternatives are rarely used, specifically these are the first person exclusive kamaliqa, the third person plural kiiluqa, and the second person singular qoo. Both forms of the second person plural, kamuluqa and kamaluqa are commonly used. There are phonetic associations with specific person pronouns. The dual pronouns all contain r, and the plurals all contain l, with exception of the third person plural kera. Lichtenberk suggests that this is due to their associations with the numbers rua which glosses as two, and ulu which glosses as three, and also that perhaps the plurals were previously trial or paucal forms of pronouns.

In some cases where the independent pronoun and a subject marker are identical (homophones) and occur in the same sentence one will be omitted, and Lichtenberk (2008) suggests it is the pronoun that is omitted. This occurs for koro, where it is both the inclusive dual inclusive independent personal pronoun and the dual inclusive nonfuture subject marker. Similarly kulu is both the plural inclusive independent plural pronoun and the plural inclusive nonfuture subject marker. Lichtenberk believes that most speakers would avoid the repetition.

(?kulu) kulu foqa naqa
PL(INCL) PL(INCL).NFUT pray PRF
"Let's pray now"

In the above example the first kulu would be deleted.

The independent personal pronouns, including the third person pronouns, are used with human reference, or with spirits, very rarely with animals. They may be used with mythological animals or with an animal that is in view.

Nia ka riki-a ma ka thathami-a kai lai bii keeroqa
3SG 3SG.SEQ see.3SG.OBJ and 3SG.SEQ want-3.OBJ 3.SG.FUT go COM 3DU
"He (a boy) saw it and wanted to go with them (his parents)"

Nia e mataqi nena
3SG 3SG.NFUT be.sick N.PAST.THERE
"It (a chicken) is sick (the chicken is in view)"

The third person pronoun can be used to specify subject topicalization, even with inanimate objects, as is:

dadaku) qeri nia qe takwi qi' laa one
Calophyllum.sp that 3SG 3SG.NFUT that stand LOC {in sand}
"The dadaku tree, it stood in the sand on the beach"

There are numerous specific uses of the independent personal pronouns such as the third person singular pronoun being used to close off a story or a narration, in a verb-less statement:

Nia bo-naqa neri
3SG ASRT=PRF N.PAST>HERE
"That's all I have to say"

To emphasize a pronoun the same strategies that are used with lexical nouns are also employed, but with a specific pronominal foregrounder ni.

Nau ku lae naqa ma ni kamuluqa
1SG 1SG.NFUT go PRF and PROFORE 2PL
"I'm going now; and you?"

Here the emphasis is on the persons being spoken to.

The inclusive pronouns can be used in a way to include the addressee, to index personal closeness or in a jocular sense.

Nau kwai qasi-qaba fas=i laa waki koro wane nau
1SG 1SG.FUT fall-hand PREC=LOC in basket DU(INCL) man 1SG
"I am going to poke my hand into our basket, my friend (in the context of searching another's basket for tobacco or areca nut)

=== Person Markers ===
Toqabaqita uses person markers with proper nouns that designate people, spirits, ogres, pets and domestic animals. They are gender differentiated, with tha used with male and ni with female people. When referring to gods and spirits and introduced Christian deities, tha is used. Tha is used to refer to all pets and domestic animals, both male and female. They are used for reference not for address, see examples 11 and 12, but even then they are not obligatory.

Tha Kwaqengara ka thare-a ni Kwakwanumae
PRSMKR Kwaqengara 3.SG.SEQ beget-3.OBJ PRSMKR Kwakwanumae
"Kwaqengara(male) begot Kwakwanumae(female)."

Contrast the need for a person marker when talking about Ulufaala the named person in the narration, rather than when he arrives in person.

Ma tha Ulufaalu qe sifo
And PRSMKR Ulufaalu 3SG.NFUT descend
"And Ulufaalu went down (to the coast?)."

Ulufaalu qe fula naqa
Ulufaalu 3SG.NFUT arrive PRF
"Ulufaalu has arrived."

Qoko suqu-si-a raa-la-na wane queri tha Saetana
2SG.SEQ block-TR-3.OBJ work-NMLZ-PERS man this PRSMKR Satan
"Block the workings of this man, Satan."

Tha is used with the nouns that refer to children, wela (child, young person), kale (offspring), or weleqi (adult males).

Tha wela 'ba=e sui naqa
PRSMKR chap that=3.SG.NFUT be.finished PRF
"The chap expired."

Tha is used for inanimate objects that actually have names.

Nini qau marakawa nia tha Raqafeqebasi
bamboo.knife piece.of.bamboo be.green 3SG PRSMKR Raqafeqebasi
"His green bamboo knife is named Raqafeqebasi."

=== Object Pronouns ===
In Toqabaqita there are two classes of transitive verbs, Class 1 and Class 2, and they index their pronominal direct objects differently. Class 1 transitives have object indexing suffixes only for the third person; -a for singular direct objects, -daroqa for dual categories and -da for plural objects.

Qo riki-a?
2SG.NFUT see-3SG.OBJ
"Did you see him/her/it?"

Qo riki-daroqa?
2SG.NFUT see-3DU.OBJ
"Did you see them(2)?"

Toqabaqita doesn't index object status first and second person, but it is indicated by the appropriate independent personal pronoun as in (18).

Kai lole qoe
3SG.IPFV tell.lie.to 2SG
"He is lying to you."

Class 2 Transitive verbs have object indexing suffixes for all grammatical persons and numbers, and follow a similar pattern to the independent personal pronouns.

	Singular	Dual	Plural
1EXCL	-ku	-mareqa	-miliqa, -maliqa, -mi(1), miqa(1)
1INCL		-karoqa	-kuluqa, -kaluqa, -ka(1)
2	-mu	-maroqa	-muluqa, -maluqa, -miu(1)
3	-na, -a	-daroqa	-da, -daluqa

Again there are forms that were previously used only by women, in women's speech, that are no longer used. For the third person singular there are two forms -na and -a, and their use is often phonologically determined, in particular so there are no sequences of three vowels.

taqe-fuil-a maka nia
ascend-site.3.OBJ father 3SG
"(of a son) replace his father."

Nia biinga qa-na qe aqi si thaitoqoma-na
3SG sleep SBEN-3SG.PERS 3SG.NFUT NEGV 3SG.NEG know-3SG.OBJ
"He was asleep (and) didn't know (about) it."

The -na object pronoun is used here in (20) to follow the vowel a.

=== Subject Pronouns ===
Toqabaqita has subject indexing suffixes which appear on the verb and also indicate nonfuture tense, future tense, imperfect aspect, sequentiality, negative aspect, and dehortation. There is some suffixes that are the same in the third person dual and plural categories. It is interesting to observe that there are no archaic women's speech forms noted by Lichtenberk.

	nonfuture	future/imperfect	sequential	negative	dehortive
1SG	ku	kwai	kwa	kwasi	kwata
2SG	qo, qoi	qoki	qoko	qosi	qoto
3SG	qe, e	kai	ka	si	ta
1DU(EXCL)	mere	meki	meka	mesi	meta
1DU(INCL)	koro	koki	koka, koko	kosi	kota
2DU	moro, mori	moki	moka, moko	mosi	mota
3DU	kero	keki, kiki	keko, kiku	kesi, kisi	keto
1PL(EXCL)	mili	miki	mika	misi	mita
1PL(INCL)	kulu	kuki	kuka	kusi	kuta
2PL	mulu	muki	muka, muku	musi	muta
3L	kera, kere, kilu	keki, kiki	keka, kiku	kesi, kisi	keta

Mada sa mika fula qi qusungadi ka leqa ba-na
or IRR 1PL(EXCL).SEQ arrive LOC tomorrow 3SG.SEQ be.good LIM-3SG.PERS
"If we come tomorrow, will that be alright? (lit. will that only be good?)"

Wela qeri roo qaaqae nia ki' qe taqaa
child that two leg 3SG PL 3SG.NFUT be.bad
"The child, both of his legs are no good."

== Possession ==
Possession in Toqabaqita is relational in that there are two entities in the relationship the "possessor" and the "possessum". The possessor may own an item, it may be a body part, or a tool. But this also includes relationships with the person or item, including a kinship relationship. Lichtenberk prefers to term these "personal suffixes" as they not only index possession, but also with a transitive verb to index their subject, to indicate a recipient/beneficiary relationship, and to index a complement with a number of prepositions. These suffixes can be used with both lexical nouns and verbs. It can be seen that some of these suffixes are identical with the singular object pronoun suffixes, namely -ku, -na, and -a.

	singular	dual	plural
1EXCL	-ku	-mareqa	-miliqa, maliqa, -mi(1), -miqa(1)
1INCL		-karoqa	-kuluqa, -kulaqa, -ka(1)
2	-mu	-maroqa	-muluqa, -maluqa, -miu(1)
3	-na, -a	-daroqa	-da, -daluqa

Again there are forms previously used by women in speech, that are no longer used, marked (1). In terms of semantics the personal suffixes are used with relational nouns where the relationship is described as inalienable possession. This includes parts of a whole (24), body parts (23,27), products of a possessor (25,26), and integral contents such as blood of animal or juice of a fruit.

gwalusu-ku
nose-1SG.PERS
"my nose"

boor-a kilu
bottom-3SG.PERS hole
"the bottom of a hole"

qiiqida-ku
sweat-1SG.PERS
"my sweat"

nuu-na
shadow/reflection/picture-3SG.PRS
"a man's shadow/reflection/picture"

babali-na
check-3SG.PERS
"his/her cheek(s)"

From a phontactic point of view, words with l or r in the syllable use third person singular -na, as in example (27). Attributes as well as spatial and temporal relations of the possessor are also designated with these personal suffixes, as in example (28).

qi qintoqo-na biqu naqi
LOC centre-3SG.PERS house this
"in the centre of this house"

Toqabaqita also employs the bare possessive noun phrase where there is no indexing of the possessor on the possessed noun. A Possessor noun phrase must be present, this may be a lexical noun or a pronoun. The two following examples display this, in that a possessor noun phrase is pronominal, and it is the independent personal pronoun that is employed. In this manner all the independent pronouns can be bare possessor nouns.

biqu keeroqa na=i Takwaraasi
house 3DU REL=LOC Takwarassi
"their house at Takwaraasi"

tarausis tekwa nau baa
trousers be.long 1SG that
"those long trousers of mine"

== Negation ==
There are a range of strategies that can be used to express negation in Toqabaqita. These are the simple negative, the negative verb, and the double negative construction.

=== Simple negative ===
==== Overview ====
The simple negative occurs when negation is achieved through means of the negative subject markers alone. The negative subject markers in Toqabaqita are listed above.

Syntactically, the negative subject markers occur in the verb phrase, between the irrealis marker (where present) and preverbal particles (where present). The negative subject markers always precede the verb.

The negative subject markers can be used to negate a range of clause types, such as declarative and imperative, shown in (31) and (32) below.

... tha wela baa si fula naqa, ...
{} PRSMKR child that 3SG.NEG arrive PRF {}
"[The people looked and looked (around),] (but) the boy had not arrived, ..."

Qosi waela qani nau
2SG.NEG laugh GENP 1SG
"Don't laugh at me."

They also occur in clauses with future- and past-time reference, as in (33) and (34) below.

Nga wane baa ki kesi lae bo=mai i qusungadi
IDENT man that PL 3PL.NEG go ASRT=VENT LOC tomorrow
"The men will not come tomorrow."

Nga wane baa ki kesi fula boqo i roqo
IDENT man that PL 3PL.NEG arrive ASRT LOC yesterday
"The men did not arrive yesterday."

The simple negation and double negation strategies are often used interchangeably, although the double negative is more common. However, there is one context in which only simple negation occurs; this is where the negated verb functions as a noun modifier as in example (35).

fanua si rodo
place NEG be.dark
"place (that is) not dark', 'place without darkness" (referring to Christian heaven)

==== "Negative additiveness" ====
The simple negative is also used in a multi-clausal construction referred to as "negative additiveness". The first clause in this construction is positive while any subsequent clauses will be negated using the negative subject markers. The underlying subjects of each clause will typically have the same reference, but the negative clause(s) will not have an expressed subject phrase.

Example (36) illustrates the negative additiveness construction. The subject of both clauses is nia, third person singular, but the second clause does not contain a subject phrase.

Nia e lae na-na si baqe laqu
3SG 3SG.NFUT go PRF-3SG.PERS 3SG.NEG speak ADD
"He went (away) without saying anything (lit. he did not also speak)."

The negative additiveness construction does, however, allow distinct subject identities when its constituent clauses involve weather expressions. For example, the subject of the first verb in (37), -qaru ‘fall,ʼ is dani ‘rain.ʼ However, the underlying subject of the second verb in (37), thato ‘be sunnyʼ, is fanua ‘placeʼ as illustrated in (38). Nevertheless, the only expressed subject in (37) is that of the first clause.

Dani e qaa-qaru, si thato naqa.
rain 3SG.NFUT REDUP-fall 3SG.NEG be.sunny PRF
"It has been raining and raining, without any sun (lit. it has not become sunny)."

(Fanua) qe thato naqa.
place 3SG.NFUT be.sunny PRF
"It is sunny now." "It has become sunny."

=== The negative verb ===
==== Overview ====
The second major strategy to express negation in Toqabaqita is the use of the negative verb aqi. This verb has a range of meanings, including ‘not be so, not be the caseʼ in general uses, and ‘not exist; not be availableʼ in existential constructions.

Aqi diverges from typical verbal behaviour in Toqabaqita in two key ways. Firstly, it only occurs with third person singular subject markers, rather than the full range of subject markers. Secondly, it typically does not take subject noun phrases.

Example (39) shows the use of the negative verb to describe the non-occurrence of a prayer service.

... teqe fa Sandee kai aqi, rua-na fa Sandee ka faa-faqa-rongo-a boqo tha Rongoomea kai ngali ...
{} one CLF Sunday 3SG.FUT not.be.so two-3.PERS CLF Sunday 3SG.SEQ REDUP-CAUS-hear-3.OBJ ASRT PRSMKR Rongoomea 3SG.FUT take.church.service {}
"... one Sunday there will be nothing, the following (lit. second) Sunday he will tell Rongoomea to take the service ..."

==== Negative existential sentences ====
Negative existential sentences are used to express the non-existence of an entity and aqi exhibits different syntactic behaviour when used in negative existential constructions.

Firstly, where aqi normally does not take subject noun phrases, it does take a subject noun phrase when used for negative existentials. Furthermore, in negative existentials, the subject phrase follows the verb, as shown in example (40) below. This is in contrast to the standard constituent order in Toqabaqita in which the subject precedes the verb, shown in the non-negative existential sentence in example (41).

Qe aqi ta firu-a
3SG.NFUT not.exist some fight-DVN
'There was no war (going on at that time).'

... roo kale-qe doo ii ba-n=i ofi-na.
{} two baby-ASS thing exist LIM-3SG.PERS=LOC marsupium-3SG.PERS
'... (perhaps) there are two baby ones in its pouch.' (Wondering whether there are baby possums in an adult possum's marsupium.)

Additionally, subject markers in negative existential constructions must be third person singular. For example, in (42), below, it can be seen that although the subject phrase tai toqa ‘some peopleʼ is plural and human, the corresponding subject marker qe is third person singular.

Qe aqi tai toqa qi laa aququa naqi
3SG.NFUT not.exist some.PL people LOC INE island this
"There are no people (living) on (lit. in) this island."

=== Double negative construction ===
The third strategy used to express negation in Toqabaqita is the double negative construction, which involves the negative verb aqi and negative subject markers in combination. This construction is more common than the simple negative.

Broadly speaking, the double negative involves two negative clauses used sequentially. The first of these may be considered a "mini-clause" involving a third person subject marker and the negative verb aqi. The second clause is a negative event clause that is negated using negative subject markers. The negative event clause does not include a subject phrase, however, a noun phrase corresponding to the subject of this event clause may optionally precede the mini-clause.

Two subtypes of the double negative have been identified; these are referred to as the "general" and "sequential" double negative constructions respectively.

==== The general double negative ====
The general double negative is used to negate an event clause. It can be schematised as follows:

(NP)	[qe aqi]	[negative.event.clause]

The NP is optional as indicated by parentheses, while the "mini-clause" qe aqi and the subsequent negative event clause are both obligatory. Example (43) shows the use of the general double negative construction without the optional noun phrase. Example (44) shows a general double negative with the subject noun phrase expressed, and example (45) shows the construction's ungrammaticality when the subject phrase occurs within the negative event clause.

Qe aqi kwasi riki-a
3SG.NFUT NEGV 1SG.NEG see-SG.OBJ
"I haven't seen him."

Nau qe=aqi kwasi thaofa
1SG 3SG.NFUT=NEGV 1SG.NEG be.hungry
"I am not hungry."

*Qe=aqi nau kwasi thaofa
3SG.NFUT=NEGV 1SG 1SG.NEG be.hungry
("I am not hungry.")

==== The sequential double negative ====
The sequential double negative is different from the general double negative in its constituents, semantics, and the contexts in which it occurs.

Firstly, the subject marker in the mini-clause is the third person singular sequential marker, ka. Secondly, the sequential construction only occurs following another clause; the coordinating construction ma 'and' may be optionally used to mark the relationship between these clauses. Finally, where the general double negative expresses a general negation of the event clause, the sequential double negative expresses "unfulfilled expectation." In other words, it expresses that circumstances that might have been expected (based on preceding discourse) failed to come to pass.

The sequential double negative construction can be schematised thus:

...	(ma)	(NP)	[ka aqi]	([negative.event.clause])

Although this construction has been identified as a double negative, the negative event clause in this construction is grammatically optional. In which case, "in clauses expressing unfulfilled expectations aqi also functions as a lexical verb."

Example (46) shows this construction with the negative event clause omitted.

Sa keki lae mai, ma ka aqi
IRR 3PL.FUT go VENT and 3SG.SEQ not.be.so
"They should have come but did not." "They were expected to come but did not."

While the negative event clause is grammatically optional, many contexts can be found where it is expressed. Examples (47) and (48) below illustrate the use of this construction with an expressed negative event clause.

Kamiliqa mili lio, ka aqi misi riki-a ta wane
1PL(EXCL) 1PL(EXCL).NFUT look 3SG.SEQ NEGV 1PL(EXCL).NEG see-3.OBJ some person
"We looked (but) did not see anybody."

Nau ku soe-toqo-na boqo, ma ka aqi si oli-si nau
1SG 1SG.NFUT ask-TEST-3SG.OBJ ASRT and 3SG.SEQ NEGV 3SG.NEG return-TR 1SG
"I did ask him, but (lit. and) he did not answer me."

== Demonstratives and spatial deictics ==
Toqabaqita boasts an array of demonstrative functions, with each category including its own formal criteria. These can be described under four basic categories:

- Determiner demonstratives
- Qualifying demonstratives
- Locative demonstrative adverbs
- Situational demonstrative adverbs

A case can also be argued for a group of reiterative demonstrative pronominals, however, since there is no overlap in formal criteria with other demonstratives, these will not be discussed. Indeed, these four basic categories are loosely defined on criteria outlined by Nikolaus P Himmelmann, however this entire article will also briefly consider demonstrative type criteria as argued by Holger Diessel, which draws on evidence from linguistic theories beyond typology, including child language acquisition, markedness theory, and grammaticalisation.

A full list of all demonstrative forms is available below:

Demonstrative forms
Determiner demonstratives	Qualifying demonstratives	Locative demonstrative adverbs		Situational demonstrative adverbs
Determiner demonstratives	Qualifying demonstratives	Presentative	General	Situational demonstrative adverbs
naqi/neqe		neqe		
qeri				neri
qena		nena		nena
baa				nabaa
labaa		labaqa	labaa/libaa	
lakoo/lokoo		lakoqo/lokoqo	lakoo/lokoo/likoo	
	loo	loqo	loori, taqabaa	
	fuu	fuqu	fuuri, fuubaa	

This section here aims to discuss how spatial deixis is negotiated in the use of Toqabaqita demonstratives, although demonstrative forms also perform a range of other functions, including temporal deixis, forms of address, and emphasis which will not be discussed here.

=== Spatial distinctions ===
Toqabaqita, like many Austronesian languages, makes distinctions between what will be termed 'spheres', wherein referent entities in a speech act may be considered members of the speaker's sphere (speaker proximal), the addressee's sphere (addressee proximal), or as belonging to neither (distal). A further distinction can be made that refers to a speech act simply not belonging to the speaker's sphere.

There is some flexibility in terms of which sphere a referent may be categorised, starting with the most apparent:

- physical proximity i.e. a referent that is physically closer to the addressee may be considered part of their sphere as opposed to the speaker's
- if the referent is a part of a whole, the referent will form part of the sphere to which the whole belongs e.g. a speaker's arms and legs are speaker proximal
- who is involved in a state of affairs, or else who is seen as central to the state of affairs being discussed in a speech act will also determine its sphere

Additionally, spatial distinctions are often combined with temporal aspects in Toqabaqita, where the time of the speech act also approximates physical proximity to a speaker.

The below table summarises this:

Aspects of a sphere
Relative physical proximity	Time of the speech act
Part-whole relations where the speaker/addressee is the whole e.g. body parts, body liquids, bodily excretions/secretions	Time that includes the time of the speech act
The speaker/addressee's location or an area that includes the speaker/addressee's location	Time that is proximal to the time of the speech act
The state of affairs characterised by the speaker/addressee's involvement	

In addition to speaker relativity encoded by spheres, spatial distinctions are also made in terms of planar and elevational dimensions in Toqabaqita. Primarily, the encoding of spheres correlates to the position of referents along a medial-distal plane, which contrasts with elevational, up-down distinctions which are described using qualifying demonstratives.

Exceptions to these distinctions are evident, which are later discussed, particularly in the elevational distinction. It is also worth reiterating that spatial deixis can often be semantically combined with some notion of temporal deixis, however the full extent of these functions will not be discussed due to scope.

=== Determiner demonstratives ===
Determiner demonstratives are modifiers within noun phrases. The internal structure of a noun phrase including a determiner demonstrative is illustrated below:

$[[noun]determiner.demonstrative]$

Their formal criteria are markedly different to that of the other demonstrative types listed in this section. Most saliently is their restriction in terms of syntactic use. Determiner demonstratives are the only identified type which can only apply within a noun phrase. In contrast, other demonstratives can apply as or can modify predicates, verbal predicates, and some take on extra functionality in that they are able to modify even obliques.

For Toqabaqita nouns, the default is always that the referent is definite, unless specified as indefinite. The absence of determiners in Toqabaqita may be attributed to its use of postnominal markers. However this lack of definite marking helps assist in obscuring its distinctions as a demonstrative.

Example 49 shows how definite determiners are unmarked. It also includes use of an addressee proximal determiner demonstrative:

Wela qe biinga; qoko alu-a taunamo qena faafi-a.
child 3SG.NFUT be.asleep 2SG.SEQ put-3.OBJ mosquito.net that(2) SUPER-3SG.OBJ
"The child is asleep; put the mosquito net over him."

Note that the demonstrative occurs prior to the object marker. Additionally, that wela, is glossed as meaning 'the child', indicating a form of definiteness about the unmarked noun. Compare this to example 50 showing the use of the indefinite article marker, incidentally also the number one, alongside the use of a qualifying demonstrative:

Teqe qerofulae lo=e tatha naq=i mangaa.
one airplane upward=3SG.NFUT pass.by PRF=LOC air.space
"An airplane up there is passing by in the sky."

Note that in this example the demonstrative has fused with the postnominal marker.

While the functionality of a qualifying demonstrative is broader in scope, and includes far less syntactic restriction than that of a determiner demonstrative (further discussion later), its usage in this example shows syntactic contrast with the prenominal indefinite article. For this reason, this example of a qualifying demonstrative is mentioned in this section, and shows that although the determiner demonstrative on its own can stray into conceptions of article functionality, it is, by formal criteria, a member of the demonstrative class.

When comparing features cross linguistically, the issue of comparability is often that there are no one-to-one correlations between languages. Combining universal criteria from both Himmelmann and Diessel, there are arguments for and against including what are called here "determiner demonstratives" as a type of demonstrative as opposed to a type of determiner or article. The name for this type of functionality in Toqabaqita itself hints that they possess flavours from both camps.

See below for a full list of determiner demonstratives and their meanings:

Determiner demonstratives
Determiner demonstratives	Meaning
naqi, neqe	speaker proximal: "this"
qeri	speaker proximal: "this"; also used endophorically
quena	addressee proximal: "that(2)"
lakoo, lokoo, labaa	distal: "that(3)"
baa	absent from speaker's sphere: "that"; also used endophorically

Note that the numbers 2, and 3 in parentheses in the table exist to differentiate the addressee and the distal, since in English, there is no comparable distinction.

Determiner demonstratives can all function as exophoric markers, i.e. whose meaning refers to reference beyond the discourse, however only some may be used endophorically, i.e. referencing either an item previously mentioned (anaphoric) or that will be mentioned later in the discourse (cataphoric). There is further debate in typological linguistics as to whether endophorically referencing demonstratives are perhaps a different subgroup, in contrast to exophoric functionality which is widely considered core to the definition of demonstratives. Since determiner demonstratives encode such a strong sense of spatial deixis in Toqabaqita, they have been included in this section, despite the increased level of syntactical restriction in typological formal criteria pertaining to its usage.

==== Speaker proximal determiner demonstratives ====
There are two phonologically varying forms of speaker proximal determiners; naqi and neqe; and qeri, which more commonly encodes temporal deixis, however can include some spatial deixis.

Speaker proximal determiners encompass speech acts which refer to the speaker sphere.

This is most straightforward in its use to signify the referent's proximity to the speaker as in example 51:

Nau kwai qono-toqo-na fasi sea naqi.
1SG 1SG.FUT sit-TEST-3.OBJ PREC chair this
"I am going to try sitting in this chair now." or "I am going to test this chair now by sitting in it."

However the speaker proximal also applies to speech acts where the referent is a part of the speaker's whole e.g. if the speaker was referring to a body part in the speech act (see example 52).

Teqe si qai qe toqe-a qae nau naqi.
one PRTT wood 3SG.NFUT prick-3.OBJ foot 2SG this
"My foot, this one, got pricked on a stick." (lit. "A stick pricked this foot of mine.")

If the referent is the speaker's location, or an area that includes the speaker's location, the speaker proximal is also used. Note that in example 53, the less common variant, neqe, is used, however the meaning is the same and naqi, would be exactly interchangeable.

Si ku=neqe e faqa-mamagu.
PRTT place=this 3SG.NFUT CAUS-consider.disgusting
"This place is disgusting."

Speaker proximal determiners can also be used when the referent involves the speaker's state of affairs, or else, that which refers to something within the speaker's vicinity (see example 54).

Kulu faqa-aqi-a taqaa-laa naqi.
PL(INCL).NFUT CAUS-not.exist-3.OBJ be.bad-NMLZ this
"Let's put an end to this unpleasantness (lit. badness).

==== Addressee proximal determiner demonstratives ====
When the addressee proximal determiner is used, qena, the referent, or noun phrase to which qena modifies, is within the addressee sphere.

Example 55 illustrates physical proximity to the addressee:

Taa n=o loge-tani-a i laa waqi qena?
what FOC=2SG.NFUT rummage.for-TR-3SG.OBJ LOC INE basket that(2)
"What are you rummaging in that basket for?"

Examples 56 and 57 demonstrate the addressee proximal forms used where the referent is part of the whole:

Losi-a gwango qena.
remove.nasal.mucus-3.OBJ nasal.mucus that(2)
"Get rid of your snot." (Said to a child with a snotty nose.)

and lastly where the referent refers to the addressee's location or state of affairs:

Oli mai fasi-a laa maaqufi qena.
return VENT ABL-3.OBJ INE cave that(2)
"Come back out of the cave!"

As can be seen, the nature of the addressee proximal form also means it is often used in imperative forms.

==== Distal determiner demonstratives ====
These are used when the referent belongs to neither the speaker's nor the addressee's spheres, provided that the referent is not significantly displaced vertically with respect to the deictic centre. The distal determiner appears in three phonological variants, lakoo, lokoo, and labaa, however to some speakers, labaa applies to relatively great distances, as opposed to lakoo, and lokoo for short distances. Semantic nuance aside, the three forms are nonetheless grammatically interchangeable overall. Example 58 demonstrates the most common form, lokoo, in use, however it would be perfectly grammatical to substitute lokoo with either lakoo or labaa.

Wane lokoo ki keki fanga qa-da.
person that(3) PL 3PL.IPFV eat SBEN-3PL.PERS
"Those people are eating."

==== An exophoric determiner demonstrative: Signalling absence ====
There is yet one more type of determiner demonstrative, baa, which signals the absence of the referent from the speaker's sphere. Unlike the other determiner demonstratives, baa, signals exophoric use which describes the absence rather than the location of a referent. Essentially, the use of baa doesn't tell us where the referent is, rather where it is not (the speaker's sphere). It is used to refer to entities which were once in the speaker's sphere, but which are no longer, for instance, it is commonly used in questions asking for where things are (see example 59).

Wela ba=e ni=i fei?
child that=3SG.NFUT be.located=LOC where?
"Where is the child?"

Note that in example 59, baa has fused with the subject marker.

Although not discussed here, baa also signals temporal deixis.

In Austronesian languages, the speaker and addressee sphere distinctions are common, and languages will usually also include one other sphere, that of the distal or the absence. What is interesting about Toqabaqita is that it includes all four.

=== Qualifying demonstratives ===
There are two qualifying demonstratives, together used to signal vertical displacement from the deictic centre:

Qualifying demonstratives	Meaning
loo	distal and higher than deictic centre: "upward"
fuu	distal and lower than deictic centre: "downward"; also used endophorically

While these qualifying demonstratives can also indicate temporal deixis, its discussion here will be limited to how spatial deixis is signalled.

There is some overlap in terms of formal criteria with the determiner demonstratives in that the qualifying demonstratives also occur as part of the noun phrase. However, only qualifying demonstratives may take third person pronouns as the head, as in example 60:

Nia lo=e teo qa-na loqo.
3SG upward=3SG.NFUT lie SBEN-3SG.PERS up.there
"He up there (He who is upward) was lying up there."

Note that, the qualifying demonstrative, loo, has fused with the subject marker.

Another formal difference which distinguishes the qualifying demonstratives from the determiner demonstratives is that the former are able to occur with indefinite, but referential noun phrases. In these cases, the qualifying demonstrative needs to specify indefiniteness, otherwise the default is definite. Recall example 50 used in earlier discussion. This demonstrates how an indefinite head can be modified by a qualifying demonstrative:

Teqe qerofulae lo=e tatha naq=i mangaa.
one airplane upward=3SG.NFUT pass.by PRF=LOC air.space
"An airplane up there is passing by in the sky."

This example also shows the use of a pronominal indefinite article, as well as a postnominal demonstrative.

Qualifying demonstratives are also able to be used alongside a determiner demonstrative when used anaphorically, and in these cases, both modify the same head noun. The qualifying demonstrative occurs after the determiner, as in the example 61:

Wane qeri loo kai gau keekene.
man that upward 3SG.IPFV pick.fruit.with.crook breadfruit
"The (aforementioned) man up there [in a tree] is picking breadfruit (hooking them with a crook and breaking them off)."

It is clear the formal criteria used to distinguish qualifying demonstratives encompasses greater syntactic possibility, however its similarities to determiner demonstratives still attest to its typological classification as a demonstrative.

=== Locative demonstrative adverbs ===
These can be divided into two types. presentative adverbs, and general locative adverbs. Together they identify the location of an entity in space, or the presence, existence of an entity at a location.

Locative demonstrative adverbs make distinctions between speaker and addressee spheres as well as elevation:

Presentative adverbs	General locative adverbs	Meaning
neq(e)		speaker proximal: "here"
nena		addressee proximal: "there(2)"
lakoq(o), lokoq(o), labaq(a)	lakoo, lokoo, likoo, labaa, libaa	distal, planar: "there(3)"
loq(o)	loori, taqabaa	distal and higher than the deictic centre: "up there"
fuq(u)	fuuri, fuubaa	distal and lower than deictic centre: "down there"

Note that the speaker proximal form, neq(e), also functions as an emphatic marker, however this function will not be discussed here.

Despite diverging in formal criteria to the aforementioned demonstrative types, locative adverbs remain a form of demonstrative due to their function in distinguishing spatial deixis. Furthermore, if we broaden our definition of demonstrative to beyond our conceptions of its functionality in English, we can conceive that it is possible for parts of speech other than the noun phrase, to take on demonstrative, deictic marking.

==== Presentative locative demonstrative adverbs ====
These are used when the referent is visible at that location, and can be pinpointed.

Example 62 shows the speaker and addressee proximal presentative adverbs used in conversation between two speakers:

62
	Qoo, teqe thaqoro neqe. oh, one possum here "Oh, there is a possum here."
	Thaqaro taa nena? possum what? there(2); What kind of possum is it there? (Male or female?)

They are able to form part of a predicate, or as the predicate itself, the latter tending to be of emphatic use and often accompanied by relatively strong stress and higher pitch. This formal criterion demarcates it from previously discussed demonstrative typology.

Example 63 illustrates how the presentative locative demonstrative adverb, neq(e), is used to modify the predicate. in this case in the relative clause, rather than the subject noun of the whole phrase, bauta:

Bauta kera na mili qaba-a ka tea ba-na neq.
boat 3PL REL 1PL(EXCL).NFUT pull-3SG.OBJ 3SG.SEQ lie LIM-3SG.PERS here
"The boat of theirs, which we had pulled (out), came to rest (lit. lie here)."

Note that locative adverbs are not part of the noun phrase, and so they are not, for instance, followed by a postnominal marker, which has been a criterion of both determiner and qualifying demonstratives (see example 64).

While determiners are confined in use as part of a noun phrase, the use of the presentative locative demonstrative adverbs is far less restricted. It can also be used with possessor phrases, where the determiner may be used alongside.

Kwa riki-a biikok na kuki rii-riki-a nuu-na i seqe-na kaleko qena ki nena, ...
1SG.SEQ see-3.OBJ peacock REL PL(INCL).IPFV REDUP-see-3.OBJ picture-3SG.PERS LOC body-3.PERS clothees that(2) PL there(2) {}
"[In the zoo] I saw peacocks, which we (only) see pictures of on those clothes there (literally: on the body of those clothes there; here: wraparounds, which often have colourful patterns)..." (The speaker points at the designs on some of the addressees' clothes.)

The presentative adverb may also take on an oblique object, as in example 65:

Oli faafi-a naifa wane n=o bili-a mai nena.
return CONF-3.OBJ knife man REL=2SG.NFUT steal-3.OBJ VENT there(2)
"Take back (lit. return with) the man's knife that you stole (and brought), (the one) there (by you)."

==== General locative demonstrative adverbs ====
These are applicable when the entity or location referent is not visible, in contrast to the presentative adverb. Likely due to this function, there are no speaker or addressee approximal forms.

Example 66 shows labaa in use:

Nau ku riki nia mai labaa.
2SG 1SG.NFUT see 3SG VENT there(3)
"I saw him over there."

General locative adverbs also show some flexibility in which clausal phrases they are able to modify, for instance they are able to capture prepositional phrases as seen in example 67:

Teqe doo qe qisuqisu qi loori.
one thing 3SG.NFUT move.rapidly.back.and.forth LOC up.there
"There is something moving rapidly back and forth up there."

There are other less common applications for general locative adverbs, however which are not included here due to scope restraints.

=== Situational demonstrative adverbs ===
These encode spatial/temporal deixis with an emphatic-identifying function, of which there are three members. They are listed below alongside their spatial meanings:

- neri (speaker proximal)
- nena (non speaker proximal)
- nabaa (past temporal significance, sphere is irrelevant)

These are clause level constituents and occur clause finally. While their use does include functions beyond spatial deixis, discussion here will be limited due to scope. For the same reasons, nabaa, although listed to provide an accurate summary, is not further discussed here.

Example 68 shows the use of both neri and nena:

Nau ku maqasi qoe neri.
1SG 1SG.NFUT wait.for 2SG NPAST.HERE
"I'm waiting for you here."
[After a while]

Maqasi nau nena.
wait.for 1SG NPAST.THERE
"Wait for me there."

In this case, the speaker changes from neri to nena which is also an imperative (see example 69).

Manga taa neri?
time what? NPAST.HERE
"What time is it now?"

Stylistic choices are also possible in that it is grammatical to choose a situational adverb depending on how the speaker wishes to contextualise the speech act. For instance, neri, the speaker proximal, can be used to describe an addressee's situation if that same referent also impacts the speaker. This could be due to physical proximity, however could be more abstract, as in example 70 which involves a mother reprimanding her children in response to an earlier event which could have impacted all of the, including the mother herself, and thus invoking the speaker proximal:

Mosi ili-li-a naq=a buri neri!
2DU.NEG do-REDUP-3SG.OBJ PRF=LOC later.time NPAST.HERE
"Don't you ever do that again!"

== Conventions and Abbreviations ==
The following table lists the conventions and abbreviations used in this page.

1	first person
2	second person
3	third person
ADD	additive
ASRT	assertive
ASS	associative
CAUS	causative
CLF	classifier
COM	comitative
CONF	confective
DU	dual
DVN	deverbal noun
EXCL	exclusive
FUT	future
GENP	general preposition
IDENT	identifier
INE	inessive
INCL	inclusive
IPFV	imperfective
IRR	irrealis
LIM	limiter
LOC	(general) locative
n.	noun
NEG	negative
NEGV	negative verb
NFUT	nonfuture
NMLZ	nominaliser
O	direct object
OBJ	object
PERS	personal
PL	plural
PREC	precedentive
PRF	perfect
PROFORE	prenominal foregrounder
PRSMKR	person marker
PRTT	partitive
REDUP	reduplication
REL	relative clause/phrase marker
S, SUBJ	subject
SBEN	self-benefactive
SEQ	sequential
SG	singular
SUPER	superessive
TR	transitive (suffix)
V	verb
VENT	ventive
X	'other' constituent, e.g. adverbial
=	cliticisation
-	word-internal morpheme boundary
