= Nikolaus P. Himmelmann =

German linguist

- Born: 2 August 1959
- Occupation: Linguist

Academic background
- Education: LMU Munich

Academic work
- Main interests: Austronesian linguistics
- Notable ideas: language documentation

Nikolaus P. Himmelmann (born 2 August 1959) is a German linguist. His interests include linguistic typology, grammar, prosody, and language documentation.

He obtained his doctorate at LMU Munich in 1986 and his habilitation at the University of Cologne in 1995. From 1996 to 1998, he was a research fellow at the Australian National University. Afterwards, he was a professor at the Ruhr University Bochum (1999–2007) and at the University of Münster (2007–2010). In 2010, he was appointed Professor of General Linguistics at the University of Cologne.

He is the co-editor of the book The Austronesian languages of Asia and Madagascar (2005).

He was elected as a member of the Academia Europaea in 2018.
