= Bauro language =

Austronesian language spoken in the Solomon Islands

Bauro
- Tairaha
- Native to: Solomon Islands
- Native speakers: (5,000 cited 1999)
- Language family: Austronesian: Malayo-Polynesian; Oceanic; Southeast Solomonic; Malaita – San Cristobal; San Cristobal; Bauro
- Dialects: Haununu; Ravo

Language codes
- ISO 639-3: bxa
- Glottolog: baur1252

Bauro, or Tairaha, is a language of the San Cristobal family, and is spoken in the central part of the island of Makira, formerly known as San Cristobal in the Solomon Islands.
