= Lau language (Malaita) =

Austronesian language spoken in the Solomon Islands

Lau
- Native to: Solomon Islands
- Region: Northeast Malaita Island
- Native speakers: (17,000 cited 1999)
- Language family: Austronesian: Malayo-Polynesian; Oceanic; Southeast Solomonic; Malaita – San Cristobal; Malaita; Northern Malaita; Lau

Language codes
- ISO 639-3: llu
- Glottolog: lauu1247

Lau, also known as Mala, is an Oceanic language spoken on northeast Malaita, in the Solomon Islands. In 1999, Lau had about 16,937 first-language speakers, with many second-language speakers through Malaitan communities in the Solomon Islands, especially in Honiara.

== Phonology ==
=== Consonants ===
Lau distinguishes voiced and voiceless stops and has a separate series of labial-velar phonemes distinct from the regular velars. The complete consonant inventory is presented in the table below (with orthographical conventions in angled brackets). The /r/ is a trilled apical rhotic.

		Labial	Alveolar	Velar		Glottal
		Labial	Alveolar	plain	labial	Glottal
Nasals		m	n	ŋ	(ŋʷ)	
Stops	voiceless		t	k	kʷ	ʔ
Stops	voiced	b	d	g	ɡʷ	
Fricatives		f	s			h
Liquids			l, r			
Glides					w	

/w/ is realised as [ŋʷ] among northern Lau speakers, and as [w] among southern Lau speakers.

=== Vowels ===
Lau has five vowels, shown in the table below. These vowels can be long or short depending on the word. Long vowels are orthographically represented by doubling the vowel. The phonotactics do not allow closed syllables, i.e. every word ends with a vowel.

	front	central	back
close	i		u
mid	e		o
open		a	

== Grammar ==
=== Morphology ===
==== Articles and numeral classifiers ====
Lau has a variety of articles distinguished by definiteness, number and shape. Ivens (1929) outlines the basic articles as follows:

- na: Denotes "the" and is used with nouns both in the singular and in the plural.
- si: Less definite, denoting "a, a part, a piece, any".
- taa, te, ke, kwe, fe and maa: Function as additional unit articles.

Sheppard (2012) revises this system by explicitly classifying articles by definiteness and number:

- na: Classified as the definite article.
- te: Classified as the singular indefinite article.
- ta: Classified as the plural indefinite article.

Sheppard also removes shape-based modifiers from the article category, placing them into a new class of numeral classifiers that follow cardinal numbers. These classifiers include:

- fe: Used for round or cyclical objects, including cyclical units of time (e.g., fe bubulu 'a star').
- mae: Used for entities extended in space and time.
- si: A partitive classifier used to indicate a portion of an entity or a diminutive reading.
- kwe: Used specifically with varieties of small fish and lobster.

Several particles serve plurality and personal marking:

- gi: Primarily marks plurality by following the noun. Sheppard reclassifies gi as a plural enclitic (=gi) that attaches to the element immediately preceding any postnominal particles within the noun phrase.
- ngwai: A prefix marking reciprocity of relationship.
- ote: Used for the plural of persons, often preceding the noun.
- a and ni: Personal articles used with proper names and some human nouns. a is for males and ni for females, a sex distinction Sheppard attributes to the sex of the referent.

==== Nouns ====
Nouns in Lau are categorised broadly by their ability to take possessive suffixes. Noun derivations and forms include:

Inalienable possession
Nouns denoting parts of the body (e.g., 'aba 'hand'), positional relationships (e.g., buri 'behind') and certain terms of relationship (e.g., haasi 'brother') take direct pronominal suffixes to express inalienable possession. For example, 'aba 'hand' takes the first-person singular suffix -gu to form 'aba-gu 'my hand'.
Verbal nouns
Derived from verbs using the terminations -a, -fa, -laa, -ta, -ngaa and -ma. For instance, mae 'to die' becomes maea 'sickness, death' and kwala 'to bear children' becomes kwalafa 'family'. Sheppard (2012) further clarifies that nouns derived with the nominalising enclitic =laa can function as the head of directly possessed noun phrases, using a short form =la.
Ordinals and kinship
The termination -na is attached to specific nouns expressing kinship and to cardinal numbers to derive ordinals.
Construct forms
Created by adding the genitive -e to the first of two adjacent nouns, sometimes triggering vowel contraction (e.g., abolo + 'ai > abole 'ai 'a log').

==== Pronouns and subject marking ====
Form Person/ number		independent subject		suffixed object	suffixed possessive
Form Person/ number		long	short	suffixed object	suffixed possessive
1st singular		inau	nau, gu, ku	-nau	-gu
2nd singular		i'oe	'oe, 'o	-oe	-mu
3rd singular		inia	nia, ni, e	-a	-na
1st plural	inclusive	igia	gia, kia	-gia, -ga	
1st plural	exclusive	igami	gami, mi	-gami, -mia	
2nd plural		igamu	gamu, mu	-gamu, -miu	
3rd plural		igera	gera, da, ta	-gera, -da	

Pronouns function independently as subjects, or are suffixed to verbs and prepositions as objects and to inalienable nouns as possessives. The longer independent forms (prefixed with i-) are used alongside their shorter counterparts for emphasis.

Lau also has dual forms (e.g., igoro, igamere) and a restricted plural denoted by a -lu suffix across plural forms (e.g., igolu, igamelu).

When expressing possession for alienable objects or food, an independent possessive marker is used (e.g., 'agu, 'amu, 'ana).

Sheppard (2012) substantially revises the grammatical framework laid out by Ivens (1929), reanalysing what were previously termed "temporal verbal particles" (such as ka and e) as a complex paradigm of subject markers. These markers index the person and number of the subject and fall into "activated" and "non-activated" paradigms, which track the current discourse prominence of referents and the sequential ordering of events.

==== Verbs ====
Almost any word in Lau can function as a verb when preceded by a verbal particle. The primary temporal particles are:

- ka: Signifies present or future time.
- ko: Denotes present or future time but occurs exclusively alongside the second-person singular pronoun 'o.
- ke: Generally denotes a future and is used strictly with the illative fi or negative si.

Sheppard (2012) supplements this by classifying verbs by valence into four groups:

Verb class	1	2	3	4
Valence type	Intransitive		Transitive	Labile

Verbs also employ several morphological markers to express valency:

Transitivity
Verbs become explicitly transitive through the addition of a consonant + i suffix (e.g., -fi, -li, -mi, -ngi, -ri, -si) or simply -i. Alternatively, the termination -ai can be suffixed to verbs and the syllable ni may be added to form -(C)aini, where (C) is any of the optional consonants f, m, ng or t. Sheppard revises the morphological analysis of the long transitive suffixes; rather than being segmented as -tai followed by an independent pronoun nia (e.g., agwa-tai nia), Sheppard argues the underlying structure is the transitive suffix -(C)aini- followed by the bound object suffix -a (e.g., agwa-taini-a).
Causation
The prefix faa- derives causative verbs.
Reciprocity
The prefix kwai- marks reciprocals.

Ivens (1929) describes negation as expressed through the particles langi and si, with si also serving as the dehortative and negative imperative. Sheppard revises this structure, identifying three distinct negative elements:

- langi: The negative verb.
- =si: The negative enclitic.
- laa: The prohibitive particle.

==== Adjectives and adverbs ====
Adjectival concepts are typically expressed through words functioning as stative verbs, which generally occur postnominally. True adjectives, however, belong to a small closed class or carry specific morphological markers.

Ivens (1929) outlines adjectives formed through morphological derivation:

- Suffixes: Nouns and verbs can take the suffixes -'a and -la to become adjectives (e.g., rodo 'night' > rorodo'a 'belonging to darkness').
- Prefixes: Adjectival prefixes include 'a- (forming participles, as in luka 'to loose' > 'aluka 'loosened'), ma- (denoting condition, as in malingi 'spilt') and tata- (spontaneity, as in tatabulobulo 'head over heels').

Sheppard (2012) identifies a heterogeneous group of four true adjectives that are neither nouns nor verbs: gale/gaala ('small'), 'inite ('female head of family'), koo ('old, respected') and ukita ('pagan'). Three of these occur prenominally, while ukita occurs postnominally. The adjective for 'small' is notable for having distinct singular (gale) and plural (gaala) forms that occupy different structural slots within the noun phrase; the singular form follows a classifier, whereas the plural form precedes both classifiers and common definite articles.

Adverbs are categorised by place, time and manner, often deriving directly from nouns, verbs or adjectives (e.g., mai 'hither', taraina 'today', ilingia 'like/as').

==== Prepositions ====
Lau has an extensive prepositional system that covers location, motion, dative, causation and instrumental relations. Prepositions govern nouns by attaching anticipatory object suffixes in agreement with the complement object (e.g., faafi-a 'concerning it'). The locative preposition i generally precedes spatial adverbs and place names.

Sheppard (2012) classifies prepositions by how they cross-reference their objects:

Type	Description	Examples
Simple	Takes no suffix.	i, fui
Verbal	Takes the -a verbal object suffix.	uri, faafi
Nominal	Takes possessive pronominal suffixes.	a-, fua
Comitative	Indexes its complement using a form identical to the third-person independent pronoun nia.	fai

==== Demonstratives ====
Sheppard (2012) identifies a demonstrative framework encoding spatial proximity and discourse status:

- Speaker proximate: naa.
- Addressee proximate: nae and nana.
- Distal: loko (singular) and loo (plural).
- Anaphoric: baa, used as a referent tracking device for shared or "given" information.

==== Numerals ====
Lau has a decimal (base-ten) counting system. In composition and quick counting, the initial e- prefix is commonly dropped from the cardinal root.

Number	Lau
1	eta, taa, te, ti, ata
2	e rua, ro, ru
3	e olu
4	e fai
5	e lima

Number	Lau
6	e ono
7	e fiu
8	e kwalu
9	e sikwa
10	e tangafulu, akwala

Ordinals are derived by attaching the termination -na to the cardinal, though exceptions exist where -la is suffixed directly (e.g., oula 'third', kwaula 'eighth'). Single digits are connected to multiples of ten using the conjunction mana (e.g., akwala mana fai 'fourteen').

=== Syntax ===
The basic Lau clause structure is organised around five ordered domains:

left periphery > subject field > verbal complex > object field > right periphery

In the following example, ioli gi 'people' is a noun phrase in the subject field. The pronoun gera acts as a co-indexed subject pronoun directly followed by the sequential/tense marker ka. The head of the predicate is the intransitive verb rii 'shout':

ma [_{S} (ioli gi) gera ka] [_{V} rii ].
and people PL 3PL SEQ shout
"And the people shouted."

Sheppard (2012) confirms the basic SVO clause structure but notes that subject and object marking within the verb complex is not strictly obligatory. Null-marking frequently occurs when referents can be understood from the discourse context.

== Wordlist ==
A sample wordlist
Lau	English	notes
wane (bai'ta)	man	bai'ta = 'big, adult'
hai (bai'ta)	woman	
wela	child	
wela wane	boy	
wela geni	girl	
gala wela = wela to'ou	small child	gala = to'ou = 'small'
u'bongia	good morning	
rodolea = rod'lea = rodo	good night	
hau'lafia	good evening	
oe uta?	how are you?	oe = 2sg ('you')
nau diana gwa'gu	I'm good	nau = 1sg ('I')

== Sample text ==
God Save the King, from an Anglican translation published in 1945.

God, ka faamouria a King!
Nia ka aofia diana
Uria toa gi;
Fa'sia firu'a,
Falea mai uria diana,
Faa'diana na talo nia,
God, faamouria a King!

== Notes and references ==
=== Bibliography ===
- Ivens, Walter George (1921), Grammar and Vocabulary of the Lau Language, Solomon Islands, Washington, DC: Carnegie Institution for Science, OCLC 2607046
- —— (1929), "A Grammar of the Lau Language, North East Coast of Big Mala, Solomon Islands", Bulletin of the School of Oriental Studies, University of London, 5 (2), Cambridge University Press: 323–343, JSTOR 607700. A revised version of Ivens (1921)
- Sheppard, Harriet (2012), A discourse-based sketch grammar of Lau (Solomon Islands), Department of Linguistics, School of Languages, Cultures and Linguistics (Thesis), Melbourne, VIC: Monash University, doi:10.26278/5bb2448d2c344

=== Further reading ===
- Fox, Charles E. (1974), Lau dictionary, Pacific Linguistics, Canberra, ACT: Australian National University, ISBN 978-0-85883-101-8
- Na tala ʼuria na idulaa diana (reading primer) (in llu), 1981, pp. 1–16
- Tala ʼaelana idulaa (reading primer) (in llu), 1982, pp. 1–55
- Tryon, Darrell T.; Suri, Ellison (1995), "Lau", In Darrell T. Tryon (ed.), Comparative Austronesian dictionary: an introduction to Austronesian studies, part 1: fascicle 1, Berlin and New York: Mouton de Gruyter, pp. 793–797
