= Baelelea language =

Austronesian language spoken in the Solomon Islands

Baelelea
- Native to: Solomon Islands
- Region: Malaita
- Native speakers: (8,800 cited 1999)
- Language family: Austronesian: Malayo-Polynesian; Oceanic; Southeast Solomonic; Malaita; Malaita; Northern Malaita; Baelelea

Language codes
- ISO 639-3: bvc
- Glottolog: bael1237

Baelelea (Mbaelelea) is a Southeast Solomonic language of Malaita.
