= Malango language =

Austronesian language spoken in the Solomon Islands

Malango
- Native to: Solomon Islands
- Region: Guadalcanal
- Native speakers: (4,100 cited 1999)
- Language family: Austronesian: Malayo-Polynesian; Oceanic; Southeast Solomonic; Gela–Guadalcanal; Guadalcanal; Malango

Language codes
- ISO 639-3: mln
- Glottolog: mala1484

Malango is a Southeast Solomonic language of Guadalcanal.
