= Langalanga language =

Austronesian language spoken in the Solomon Islands

Wala
- Langalanga
- Region: Solomon Islands
- Native speakers: (7,000 cited 1999)
- Language family: Austronesian: Malayo-Polynesian; Oceanic; Southeast Solomonic; Malaita – San Cristobal; Malaita; Northern Malaita; Wala

Language codes
- ISO 639-3: lgl
- Glottolog: wala1266

Wala, or Langalanga, is an Oceanic language spoken on Malaita, in the Solomon Islands.

== Bibliography ==
- Lovegren, Jesse; Mitchell, Alice; Nakagawa, Natsuko (2015). The Wala language of Malaita, Solomon Islands (PDF). Studies in the Languages of Island Melanesia. Asia-Pacific linguistics. ISBN 978-1-922185-14-3.
