= Saʼa language =

Austronesian language spoken in the Solomon Islands

Saʼa
- Region: South Malaita, Solomon Islands
- Native speakers: (12,000 cited 1999)
- Language family: Austronesian: Malayo-Polynesian; Oceanic; Southeast Solomonic; Malaita – San Cristobal; Malaita; Saʼa
- Dialects: Saʼa; Ulawa; Uki

Language codes
- ISO 639-3: apb
- Glottolog: saaa1240

Saʼa (also known as South Malaita and Apaeʼaa) is an Oceanic language spoken on Small Malaita and Ulawa Island in the Solomon Islands. In 1999, there were around 12,000 speakers of the language.

== Phonology ==
The phonemes of Saʼa are listed below.

=== Consonants ===
| | Labial | | Alveolar | Post- alveolar | Velar | Glottal |
| | plain | lab. | Alveolar | Post- alveolar | Velar | Glottal |
|---|---|---|---|---|---|---|
| Plosive | p | pʷ | t | tʃ | k | ʔ |
| Fricative | | | s | | | h |
| Nasal | m | mʷ | n | | ŋ | |
| Lateral | | | l | | | |
| Tap | | | ɾ | | | |
| Approximant | w | | | | | |

=== Vowels ===
| | Front | Central | Back |
|---|---|---|---|
| Close | i | | u |
| Mid | e | | o |
| Open | | a | |
