= Fataleka language =

Austronesian language spoken in the Solomon Islands

Fataleka
- Native to: Solomon Islands
- Region: Malaita
- Native speakers: (6,700 cited 1999)
- Language family: Austronesian: Malayo-Polynesian; Oceanic; Southeast Solomonic; Malaita – San Cristobal; Malaita; Northern Malaita; Fataleka

Language codes
- ISO 639-3: far
- Glottolog: fata1245

A Fataleka speaker, recorded in Honiara.

Fataleka is a Southeast Solomonic language of Malaita.
