= Bughotu =

Bughotu may be,

- Bughotu language, Solomon Islands
- Turbonilla bughotu, sp. sea snail
