= Arnarvon Islands =

Group of islands in Solomon Islands

Coordinates: 7°27′S 158°00′E

Arnarvon Islands are a group of islands in Solomon Islands. They are located in Isabel Province and nearby to Wagina Island in Choiseul Province.

== Geography ==
The Arnavon Islands consist of:

- Major islands:
  1. Sikopo
  2. Kerehikapa
  3. Maleivona
- Minor islands
  1. Tuma
  2. Leko

== Conservation area ==
The Arnarvon Islands are home to the Arnarvon Marine Conservation Area, which encompasses 157 square kilometres (61 sq mi) between Santa Isabel and Choiseul islands in the Manning Straights. The Conservation Area was established in 1995 and was the first community-managed marine conservation area in Solomon Islands. It is a nesting ground for critically endangered hawksbill sea turtles. Sightings of Indo-Pacific bottlenose dolphin (Tursiops aduncus) have been confirmed in the Conservation Area.

The Arnarvon Marine Conservation Area is identified as an area with high biodiversity and conservation values. Reef sites in the Arnarvon Marine Conservation Area were surveyed in 2014 around Kerehikapa and Sikopo within the boundaries of the conservation area, as well as the area around Malakobi, which lies outside the conservation area. The site at Kerehikapa had an average of 51% LCC, which was the highest average live coral cover of all areas surveyed in the Solomons. One site had the highest overall with 69% LCC. Algae accounted for an average of 30% around Kerehikapa and was composed predominantly of crustose coralline algae and turf algae. Kerehikapa was dominated by Acropora, followed by Porites. These two dominant genera accounted for over 40% of the coral observed at this site. Sikopo had only 30% LCC when compared to Kerehikapa with significant amounts of coral rubble and very little reef structure, which may have been damage caused by the tsunami that struck Isabel Province in April 2007. The dominant genera around Sikopo were Acropora and Montipora, with Cyphastrea at greater levels as compared to other regions of the Solomons. The survey outside of the conservation area at Malakobi identified live coral cover ranged drastically from 8-45%. The average algal cover of 52% was evenly spread among crustose coralline algae, erect coralline algae, macroalgae, turf, and turf with sediment. Malakobi was dominated by Acropora, Isopora and Porites.
