= 158th meridian east =

Line of longitude

158th meridian east

The meridian 158° east of Greenwich is a line of longitude that extends from the North Pole across the Arctic Ocean, Asia, the Pacific Ocean, Australasia, the Southern Ocean, and Antarctica to the South Pole.

The 158th meridian east forms a great circle with the 22nd meridian west.

== From Pole to Pole ==
Starting at the North Pole and heading south to the South Pole, the 158th meridian east passes through:

Co-ordinates	Country, territory or sea	Notes
90°0′N 158°0′E	Arctic Ocean	
76°49′N 158°0′E	Russia	Sakha Republic — Jeannette Island
76°46′N 158°0′E	East Siberian Sea	
71°1′N 158°0′E	Russia	Sakha Republic; Chukotka Autonomous Okrug — from 67°43′N 158°0′E; Sakha Republic — from 67°15′N 158°0′E; Magadan Oblast — from 66°7′N 158°0′E
61°44′N 158°0′E	Sea of Okhotsk	Shelikhov Gulf
57°59′N 158°0′E	Russia	Kamchatka Krai — Kamchatka Peninsula
51°44′N 158°0′E	Pacific Ocean	
6°49′N 158°0′E	Federated States of Micronesia	Ant Atoll — just west of the island of Pohnpei
6°45′N 158°0′E	Pacific Ocean	Passing between the islands of Sikopo and Kerehikapa, Solomon Islands (at 7°26′S 158°0′E)
7°27′S 158°0′E	New Georgia Sound	
8°30′S 158°0′E	Solomon Islands	Islands of Marovo and Vangunu
8°46′S 158°0′E	Solomon Sea	
11°49′S 158°0′E	Coral Sea	Passing just west of the Chesterfield Islands, New Caledonia (at 19°37′S 158°11′E)
29°56′S 158°0′E	Pacific Ocean	
60°0′S 158°0′E	Southern Ocean	
69°14′S 158°0′E	Antarctica	Australian Antarctic Territory, claimed by Australia

== See also ==
- 157th meridian east
- 159th meridian east
