= Mahige =

Island in Solomon Islands

Coordinates: 8°30′49″S 159°54′52″E

Mahige is a small islet in Isabel Province of Solomon Islands. The islet is located off the south-east tip of Santa Isabel Island.
