= 159th meridian east =

Line of longitude

159th meridian east

The meridian 159° east of Greenwich is a line of longitude that extends from the North Pole across the Arctic Ocean, Asia, the Pacific Ocean, Australasia, the Southern Ocean, and Antarctica to the South Pole.

The 159th meridian east forms a great circle with the 21st meridian west.

== From Pole to Pole ==
Starting at the North Pole and heading south to the South Pole, the 159th meridian east passes through:

Co-ordinates	Country, territory or sea	Notes
90°0′N 159°0′E	Arctic Ocean	
76°35′N 159°0′E	East Siberian Sea	
70°52′N 159°0′E	Russia	Sakha Republic; Chukotka Autonomous Okrug — from 68°8′N 159°0′E; Magadan Oblast — from 66°14′N 159°0′E; Chukotka Autonomous Okrug — from 65°56′N 159°0′E; Magadan Oblast — from 65°43′N 159°0′E
61°54′N 159°0′E	Sea of Okhotsk	Shelikhov Gulf
58°24′N 159°0′E	Russia	Kamchatka Krai — Kamchatka Peninsula
53°4′N 159°0′E	Pacific Ocean	
7°50′S 159°0′E	Solomon Islands	Santa Isabel Island
8°4′S 159°0′E	New Georgia Sound	Passing just west of the Russell Islands, Solomon Islands (at 9°4′S 159°2′E)
9°4′S 159°0′E	Solomon Sea	
11°50′S 159°0′E	Coral Sea	Passing just east of the Chesterfield Islands, New Caledonia (at 19°12′S 158°58′E)
29°55′S 159°0′E	Pacific Ocean	Passing just west of Lord Howe Island, Australia (at 31°31′S 159°2′E); Passing just east of Macquarie Island, Australia (at 54°30′S 158°58′E)
60°0′S 159°0′E	Southern Ocean	
69°22′S 159°0′E	Antarctica	Australian Antarctic Territory, claimed by Australia

== See also ==
- 158th meridian east
- 160th meridian east
