= Optus (satellite) =

List of communications satellites

This is a list of the satellites operated by Optus, an Australian telecommunications company. The satellite communications facility is located at Belrose on Sydney's Northern Beaches. Optus' satellites are divided into 4 classes A, B, C and D. As of April 2014 it owns and operates Optus B3, Optus C1, Optus D1, Optus D2 and Optus D3. Optus A1, Optus A2, Optus A3 and Optus B1 satellites have been retired. Optus has the largest network of satellites in Australia and New Zealand.

On 2 February 2014, NBN Co of Australia chose Optus for a five-year contract to operate two purpose-built satellites (the Sky Muster satellites) to deliver high speed broadband across rural and remote Australia.

== A-Class ==
- Satellite Type: Hughes HS-376
- Design Life: 7 Years for A1 & A2 – 10 Years for A3
- Equipment: 15 K_{u} band transponders (including four 30W transponders and eleven 12W transponders)
- Diameter: 2.2m
- Height: 2.9m (stowed), 6.3m (deployed)

The Aussat A-Class satellites were funded by the Government for Aussat Pty Ltd. When Optus was granted a telecommunications carrier licence in 1991, it was bundled with the purchase of Aussat Pty Limited as part of the carrier licence deal.

=== Aussat (Optus) A1 ===
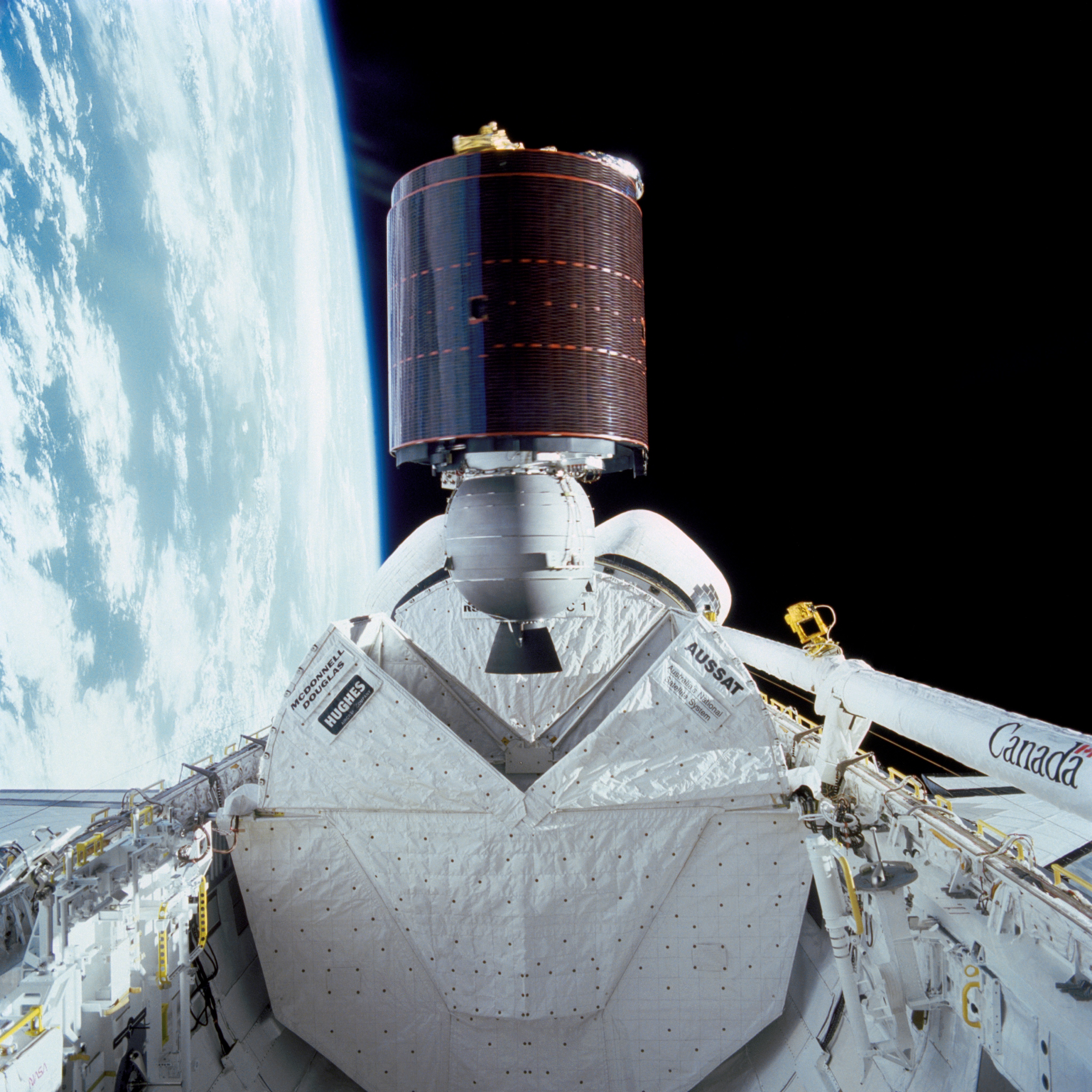
Aussat 1 (now Optus A1) on deployment from Space Shuttle Discovery on STS-51-I

- Operational Location: 160° east (1985–1993)
- Launch Date: 27 August 1985 (Out of service; not deorbited)

Aussat 1 was deployed by Space Shuttle Discovery during the first day of the STS-51-I mission.

=== Aussat (Optus) A2 ===
- Operational Locations: 156° east (1985–1993), 164° east (1993–1999)
- Launch Date: 27 November 1985 (Out of service; not deorbited)

Aussat 2 was deployed by Space Shuttle Atlantis during the STS-61-B mission.

=== Aussat (Optus) A3 ===
- Operational Locations: 164° east (1987–1993), 156° east (1993–1995), 152° east (1995–1999)
- On retirement from Optus service, Optus A3 was transferred to the 31.5°E orbital position which belongs to SES.
- Launch Date: 16 September 1987
- Moved to graveyard orbit and shutdown: April 2008 Watch The shutdown on Youtube.com
- Was the oldest HS-376 still in active operation

Aussat 3 was launched from Guiana Space Centre by an Ariane 3.

== B-Class ==
- Satellite Type: Hughes HS-601
- Design Life: 10 Years
- Equipment: 15 K_{u} band transponders, 1 L band transponder, K_{a} band beacon, laser retroreflector

The B-Class satellites were manufactured by Hughes and launched from the Xichang Satellite Launch Center by Long March rockets. The two satellites were the first U.S.-built satellites to be approved by the Reagan administration for launch on Chinese rockets. To break into the commercial launch market, the Chinese offered to launch for less than half of what a U.S. launch company would charge.

=== Optus B1 ===
- Primary mission location: 160° east
- Current location: Sent to Junk orbit
- Launch date: 14 August 1992
- Beacon frequencies: 12.748.000 H / 12.749.000 H

Optus B1 was moved to Junk orbit in May 2008.

==== Failures ====
Satellite Control Processor

On 21 May 2005 services were temporarily lost when the Primary Satellite Control Processor failed. The satellite was switched to use the Backup SCP in order to restore services. Thereafter the satellite continued to operate from the Backup SCP.

March 2006 Positioning Failure

At 06:52 UTC on 30 March 2006, a routine repositioning manoeuvre failed, resulting in loss of pointing control of the satellite. Although communication with the satellite was not lost, transmission services provided by the satellite failed due to its incorrect positioning. Services were progressively restored between 18:00 and 20:00 UTC.

Local time at the time of the start of the outage ranged from 14:52 AWST to 18:52 NZST, a peak time for listeners and viewers of the radio and television broadcast and subscription services provided directly or indirectly by the satellite.

=== Optus B2 ===
- Launch Date: 21 December 1992

The Long March 2E rocket carrying Optus B2 experienced a collapse of the payload fairing, destroying the satellite. The rocket continued functioning and delivered the debris into low Earth orbit. The cause of the failure could not be determined at the time. However, the Long March 2E experienced the same payload fairing collapse when launching Apstar 2 in 1995. Based on instrumentation added to the satellite, Hughes determined that the failure was caused by aerodynamic forces and wind shear. The information provided by Hughes caused great political controversy in the United States, which subsequently banned U.S. satellites from being launched on Chinese rockets.

=== Optus B3 ===
- Primary mission locations: 156° east (from initial launch until establishment of Optus C1), 152° east (until establishment of Optus D2)
- Current location: 164° east inclined(as at 2008-02-17)
- Launch Date: 27 August 1994

Optus B3 was launched as a replacement for Optus B2. After the fairing failure that destroyed Optus B2, Hughes recommended reinforcement of the fairing. The Chinese chose not to follow the recommendations and instead added more rivets. The launch of Optus B3 was successful, but the next launch of the Long March 2E experienced another fairing failure and destroyed the Apstar 2 satellite.

This satellite is owned by the Commonwealth Bank of Australia and leased back to Singtel Optus. It was replaced by Optus D2.

== Optus (and Defence) C1 ==
Artist impression of Optus C1

- Satellite Type: Space Systems/Loral (SS/L): LS-1300
- Launch Date: 11 June 2003
- Location: 156° east
- Design Life: 15 Years
- Equipment: 24 K_{u} band transponders, 4 (+1) K_{a} band transponders, 4 X band transponders, 6 UHF transponders

Partially funded by the Australian Government (Defence Department) – Optus C1's use is shared between Defence and Telecommunications, in particular the supply of Television services to Australia. Mitsubishi Electric was the prime contractor responsible for manufacturing all the Optus C1 communications systems.

== D-Class ==
Artist impression of Optus D1

- Manufacturer: Orbital Sciences Corporation
- Satellite type: Orbital STAR 2 platform
- Design life: 15+ years

The D1 and D2 satellites replace and expand the services provided by the B1 and B3 satellites respectively, which had both been operating beyond their design lifetimes. The D3 satellite is co-located with C1 to expand capacity.

=== Optus D1 ===
- Location: 160° east
- Launch Date: 13 October 2006
- Equipment: 24 K_{u} band transponders
- Launch mass: 2350 kg

D1 was successfully launched by an Ariane 5 ECA on 13 October 2006 at 20:56 UTC. It was the first satellite to sign contract for Launch Services Alliance mission assurance.

Customers on D1 include the Australian Broadcasting Corporation (ABC), Special Broadcasting Service (SBS), the Seven Network, the Nine Network, Sky Television New Zealand and New Zealand's Kordia (formerly known as BCL). D1 also supports VSAT users.

Kordia is leasing a full transponder for sublease to TVNZ (TVNZ 1 & TVNZ 2) and Discovery New Zealand (Three & Bravo) for the Freeview service. The Kordia transponder will be on 12.4697 GHz.

==== Incorrect configuration of New Zealand spot beam ====
During in-orbit testing of the satellite, it was discovered that the New Zealand spot beam had been configured with horizontal polarisation instead of the expected vertical polarisation – as had been used on its predecessor Optus B1.

As many existing receivers did not have the ability to receive horizontally aligned signals, Sky Television was unable to transfer services from Optus B1 to this beam as expected. Sky was instead assigned capacity on the more general Australia/NZ beam. Due to restrictions on broadcast rights (in terms of both broadcast licensing and copyright), the unencrypted Freeview service could not make a similar allocation switch and was set up as a horizontally-aligned service on the New Zealand spot beam.

On 31 July 2007, Sky successfully performed an over the air software upgrade to all of its customer set-top boxes, enabling them to receive the horizontally-aligned signals from the New Zealand spot beam. Accordingly, Sky was able to return to their original capacity allocation.

=== Optus D2 ===
- Location: 152° east
- Launch date: 5 October 2007
- Equipment: 24 active K_{u} band transponders (including sixteen 150W transponders and eight 44W transponders).
- Launch mass: 2375 kg

D2 was successfully launched from the Guiana Space Centre by an Ariane 5 GS on 5 October 2007 at 22:02 UTC.

Optus D2 replaced Optus B3, which had been in operation for 13 years at the time of D2's launch.

D2 also carries a large number of Free To Air channels, many in languages other than English

=== Optus D3 ===
- Location: 156° east
- Launch Date: 21 August 2009
- Equipment: 32 K_{u} band transponders (consisting of twenty four 125 watt primary and eight 44 watt backup transponders)
- Launch mass: 2500 kg

The third in the D series of Optus satellites was successfully launched into a geostationary transfer orbit on 21 August 2009 at 22:09 UTC by Arianespace using an Ariane 5 ECA launch vehicle from Europe's Spaceport in Kourou, French Guiana. The satellite will be co-located with Optus C1 at 156° east. Optus sold 25% of the transponder capacity (6 out of 24) to Foxtel to provide High Definition programming as well as "new channels, expanded digital services and enhanced picture and sound quality".

=== Optus 10 ===
- Location: 156° east
- Launch Date: 11 September 2014
- Launch Site: Guiana Space Center
- Rocket: Ariane 5 ECA
- Manufacturer: Space Systems Loral (SSL)
- Bus: LS-1300
- Possible Equipment (based on previous D-series): 32 K_{u} band transponders (consisting of twenty four 125 watt primary and eight 44 watt backup transponders)
- Launch mass: 3200 kg
- Regime: Geostationary

"Optus 10", was awarded to Space Systems/Loral, and announced on 21 March 2011 in a press release by Optus CEO Paul O'Sullivan. The satellite will provide "high quality broadcast services to households, and two way voice and data communication services to areas in and around Australia and NZ", and "satellite services to Australia and NZ Government departments, premium companies and broadcasters including FOXTEL, ABC, SBS, Seven Network, Nine Network, Network Ten, Globecast Australia and Sky TV New Zealand.".

=== Optus 11 ===
Optus 11 is now expected to be launched in the second half of 2028 by an Ariane 6 rocket. Originally scheduled for launch in 2023, continual delays by Airbus Defence and Space in software integration critical to nominal satellite operation have caused over four years of delays in launching the satellite. The Ariane 64 configuration for this mission will provide enhanced launch energy performance to directly insert the Optus-11 satellite into a high-energy geostationary transfer orbit, enabling it to be commissioned more quickly.
