= 21st meridian =

21st meridian may refer to:

- 21st meridian east, a line of longitude east of the Greenwich Meridian
- 21st meridian west, a line of longitude west of the Greenwich Meridian
