= 24th meridian =

24th meridian may refer to:

- 24th meridian east, a line of longitude east of the Greenwich Meridian
- 24th meridian west, a line of longitude west of the Greenwich Meridian
