= Bellona Platform =

Submerged landmass in the Pacific Ocean

The Bellona Platform is a submarine geological feature encompassing the Chesterfield Islands (19°21′S 158°40′E) and Bellona Reefs (20.999948°S 158.999313°E) west of New Caledonia. It was once a 22,800 square kilometres (8,800 sq mi) landmass, previously with large islands with land areas totalling around 13,800 square kilometres (5,300 sq mi) which became mostly submerged when sea levels rose at the end of the Last Glacial Maximum, 20,000 years ago. These former islands might have played a role in the spread of flora and fauna, including humans, in the southwest Pacific.
