= 157th meridian =

157th meridian may refer to:

- 157th meridian east, a line of longitude east of the Greenwich Meridian
- 157th meridian west, a line of longitude west of the Greenwich Meridian

157th meridian west	157th meridian east
