= 22nd meridian =

22nd meridian may refer to:

- 22nd meridian east, a line of longitude east of the Greenwich Meridian
- 22nd meridian west, a line of longitude west of the Greenwich Meridian
