= Furona Island =

Island in Solomon Islands

Coordinates: 8°08′S 159°06′E

Furona Island is a small island off the coast of Santa Isabel in Solomon Islands.

Its only village, also called Furona, is home to speakers of the Bughotu language.
