= 156th meridian =

156th meridian may refer to:

- 156th meridian east, a line of longitude east of the Greenwich Meridian
- 156th meridian west, a line of longitude west of the Greenwich Meridian

156th meridian west	156th meridian east
