= Buala =

- Location in Solomon Islands
- Coordinates: 8°08′S 159°35′E
- Country: Solomon Islands
- Province: Isabel
- Island: Santa Isabel Island
- Elevation: 0 m (0 ft)

Population (2019)
  - Total: 1,342
- Time zone: UTC+11 (UTC)
- Climate: Af

Buala is a town in Solomon Islands located on Santa Isabel Island, which is the longest island in Solomon Islands. Buala consists of Jejevo Station and Buala Village. Buala is located on a side of a hill that limits the town's expansion. New feeder roads have been extended to the east and west of the township. One of these roads reaches as far as Hovokiolo village in the west Maringe district.

A nearby peak, Mt. Kubonitu, can be reached from Buala, and its neighboring villages, Tirotogna and Bara. Other nearby villages include Kubolota, Tithiro, and Maglau. Higher up inland, are the nearby villages of Tirotogna, Bara, Gurena and Kolokofa. People from these villages frequently visit Buala.

The town has a hospital, but more serious cases are flown to Honiara. There is a branch of Bank of South Pacific in the town. There is no grocery shop in the town. There is a small market where residents sell fresh vegetables and fruits every day other than Sunday. There are areas that sell fresh fish, such as Kolofaga Fishery.

This town is close to Fera Island, about 15 minutes boat ride. The airfield is on Fera Island. It is a grass field and only 10 to 15 passenger planes land here. A new terminal block was completed in April 2012.

== Climate ==
Buala has a tropical rainforest climate (Af) with heavy to very heavy rainfall year-round.

Climate data for Buala
Month	Jan	Feb	Mar	Apr	May	Jun	Jul	Aug	Sep	Oct	Nov	Dec	Year
Mean daily maximum °C (°F)	30.7 (87.3)	30.4 (86.7)	30.5 (86.9)	30.6 (87.1)	30.6 (87.1)	30.2 (86.4)	29.7 (85.5)	29.9 (85.8)	30.1 (86.2)	30.6 (87.1)	30.8 (87.4)	30.9 (87.6)	30.4 (86.8)
Daily mean °C (°F)	27.3 (81.1)	27.0 (80.6)	27.0 (80.6)	27.0 (80.6)	26.9 (80.4)	26.5 (79.7)	26.1 (79.0)	26.3 (79.3)	26.4 (79.5)	26.8 (80.2)	27.1 (80.8)	27.2 (81.0)	26.8 (80.2)
Mean daily minimum °C (°F)	23.9 (75.0)	23.7 (74.7)	23.6 (74.5)	23.5 (74.3)	23.3 (73.9)	22.9 (73.2)	22.6 (72.7)	22.7 (72.9)	22.8 (73.0)	23.0 (73.4)	23.4 (74.1)	23.6 (74.5)	23.3 (73.9)
Average precipitation mm (inches)	360 (14.2)	346 (13.6)	391 (15.4)	261 (10.3)	193 (7.6)	155 (6.1)	197 (7.8)	178 (7.0)	172 (6.8)	193 (7.6)	199 (7.8)	275 (10.8)	2,920 (115)
Source: Climate-Data.org
