= 23rd meridian =

23rd meridian may refer to:

- 23rd meridian east, a line of longitude east of the Greenwich Meridian
- 23rd meridian west, a line of longitude west of the Greenwich Meridian
