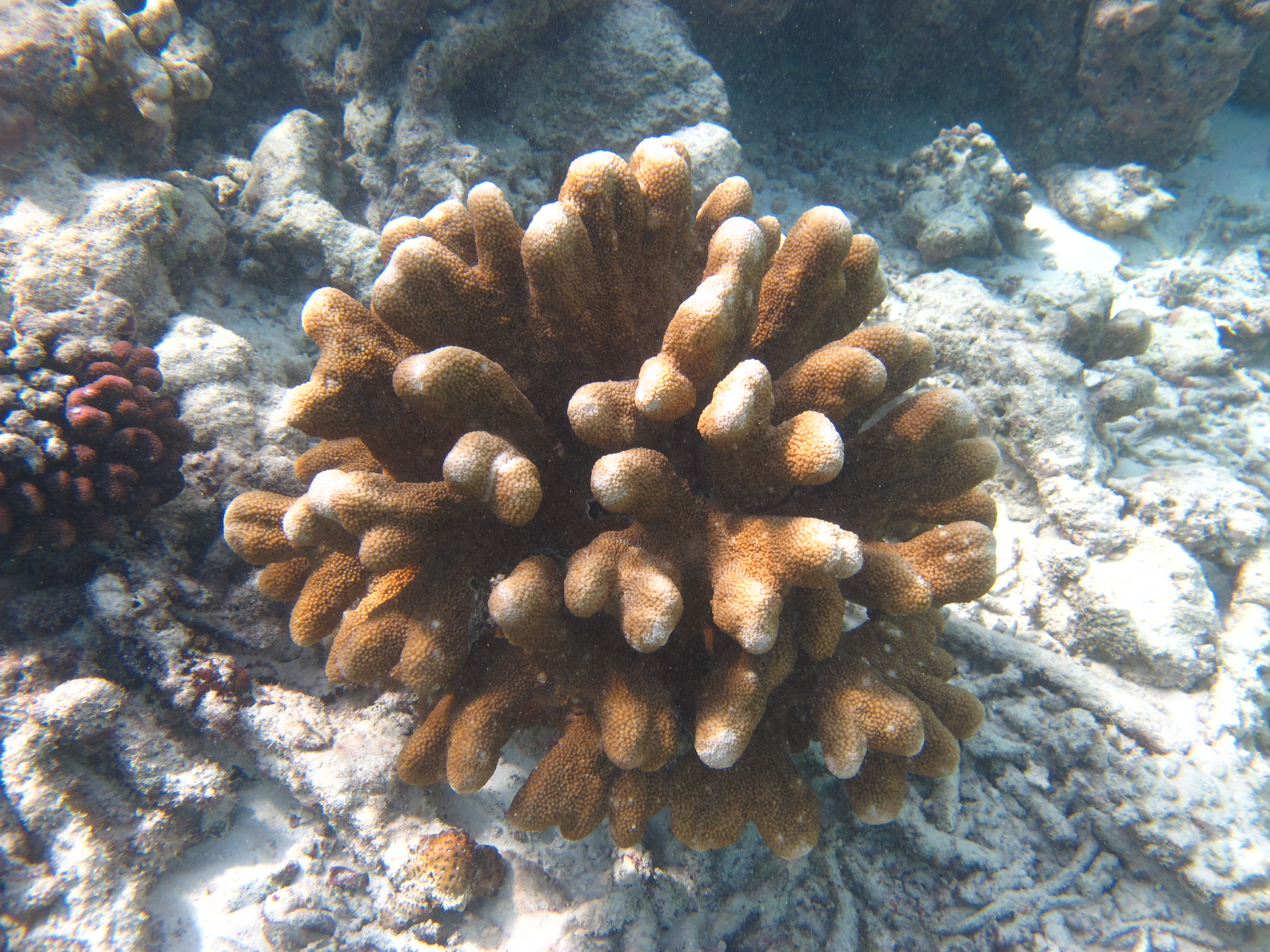
- Acropora palifera in Maldives

Conservation status
- Endangered (IUCN 3.1)

Scientific classification
- Kingdom: Animalia
- Phylum: Cnidaria
- Subphylum: Anthozoa
- Class: Hexacorallia
- Order: Scleractinia
- Family: Acroporidae
- Genus: Isopora
- Species: I. palifera

Binomial name
- Isopora palifera (Lamarck, 1816)

Synonyms
- List: Acropora palifera Lamarck, 1816; Acropora prominens Nemenzo, 1967; Astrea palifera Lamarck, 1816; Madrepora cylindrus Ortmann, 1892; Madrepora labrosa Dana, 1846; Madrepora turgida Verrill, 1866

= Isopora palifera =

Species of coral

Isopora palifera is a species of stony coral in the family Acroporidae. It is a reef building coral living in shallow water and adopts different forms depending on the water conditions where it is situated. It is found in the Western Indo-Pacific Ocean as far east as Australia.

== Description ==
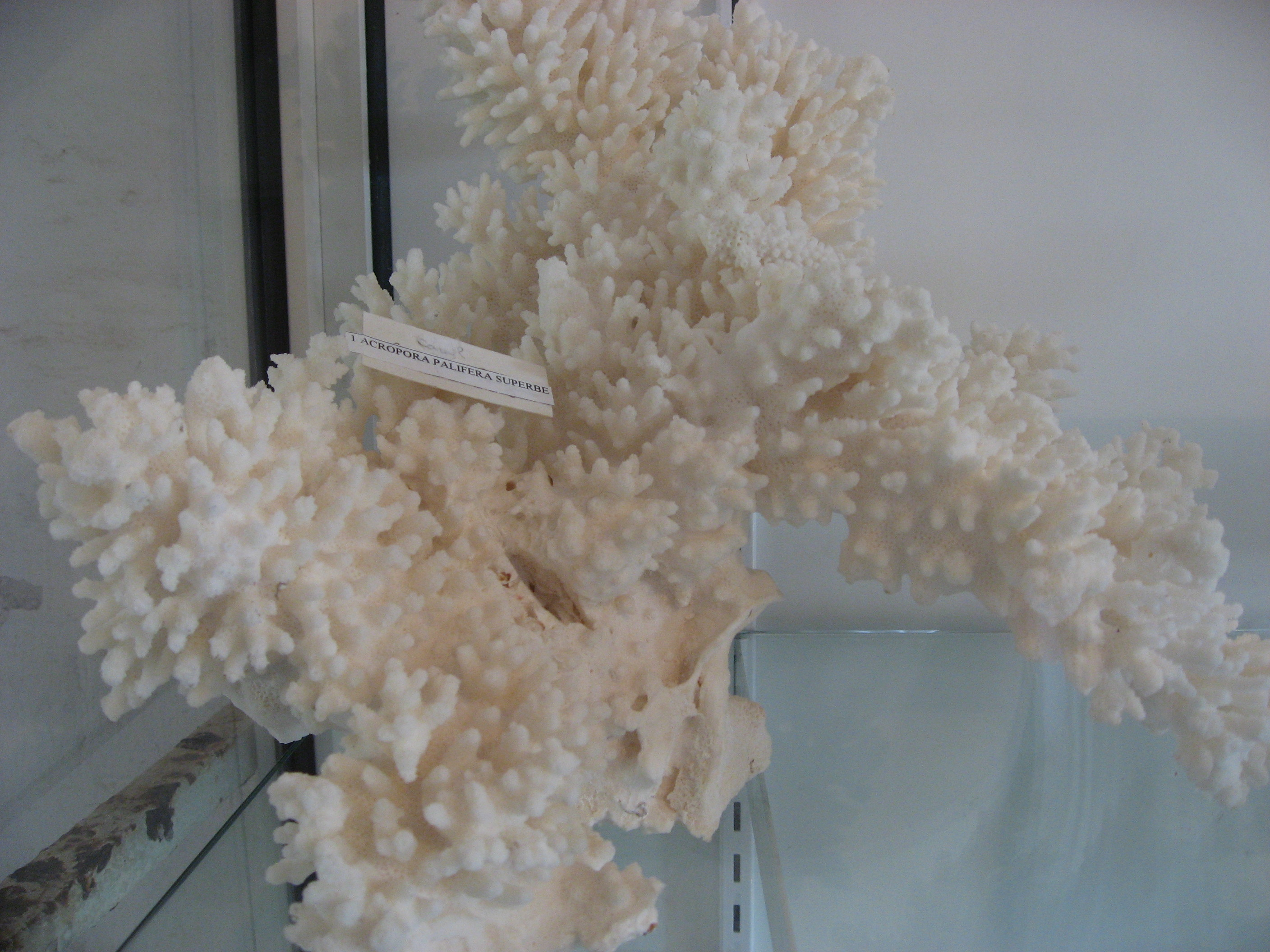
Skeleton of Isopora palifera

Isopora palifera can be encrusting, or massive, form columnar branches or parallel ridges of blade-like branches. The shape adopted is much dependent on how much water movement there is at its site of growth; it is encrusting in a strong current or on the seaward side of a reef and is more branching in calm, still conditions. The branches are 5 to 15 cm (2 to 6 in) in diameter and up to 20 cm (8 in) long. Each branch has several axial corallites up to 4 millimetres (0.16 in) in diameter. The radial corallites are cylindrical, large and close together or touching, and project from the branches by up to 5 millimetres (0.20 in). Each has a distinct, large irregularly shaped opening near the tip. The colour of this coral is greenish, creamy or pale brown. This colour comes from minute symbiotic dinoflagellates known as zooxanthellae which live within the tissues of the coral polyps. These photosynthetic algae use sunlight to create organic compounds and the coral is able to use these to provide part of its nutritional needs. Fluorescent granules of pigment are present in the tissues and these are in greater concentrations in individuals growing in high-light environments. Isopora palifera closely resembles Isopora cuneata, and often has similar forms of growth, but I. cuneata mostly occurs in more eastern parts of the Pacific and in shallower water, and the holes in its conical-shaped radial corallites are circular in outline.

== Distribution ==
Isopora palifera is found in the Indo-Pacific Ocean. Its range extends from South Africa and Madagascar to East Africa, Aldabra and Chagos, India, China, Japan, Indonesia and Australia. It is the commonest species of coral in the northern part of the Great Barrier Reef. It is a reef building coral and is found subtidally on reef flats, edges walls and slopes. Isopora palifera first appears in the fossil record in Papua New Guinea in the Pliocene.

== Biology ==
Isopora palifera is a vigorous and aggressive species of coral; where it comes into contact with other corals it will overgrow them and kill their tissues. It has a porous structure and is rather fragile so that it is easily damaged by storms. Detached pieces are able to re-establish themselves in suitable locations. The coral is susceptible to black band disease and white band disease.

In a study in Taiwan, it was found that two different algal symbionts, Symbiodinium phylotypes C and D, were associated with the coral. One or both were present at any one time, the proportion of each fluctuating with the time of year, the sea water temperature and changing light levels. It is when neither is present, as may happen when the water temperature rises too high, that bleaching is caused, and when this happens, the coral is prone to damage, disease, and death.
