= Ramos Island =

Island in Solomon Islands

Coordinates: 8°15′S 160°11′E

Ramos Island is an island in the Solomon Islands; it is located in Isabel Province.

The first recorded sighting by Europeans was by the Spanish expedition of Álvaro de Mendaña on 11 April 1568. More precisely, the sighting was due to a local voyage made by a small boat, in the accounts, the brigantine Santiago, commanded by Maestre de Campo Pedro Ortega Valencia and with Hernán Gallego as pilot. They charted it as Isla de Ramos, as it was found on Domingo de Ramos (Palm Sunday in Spanish).
