= Isabel Province =

Isabel Province Isabel Provins (Pijin)
- Province
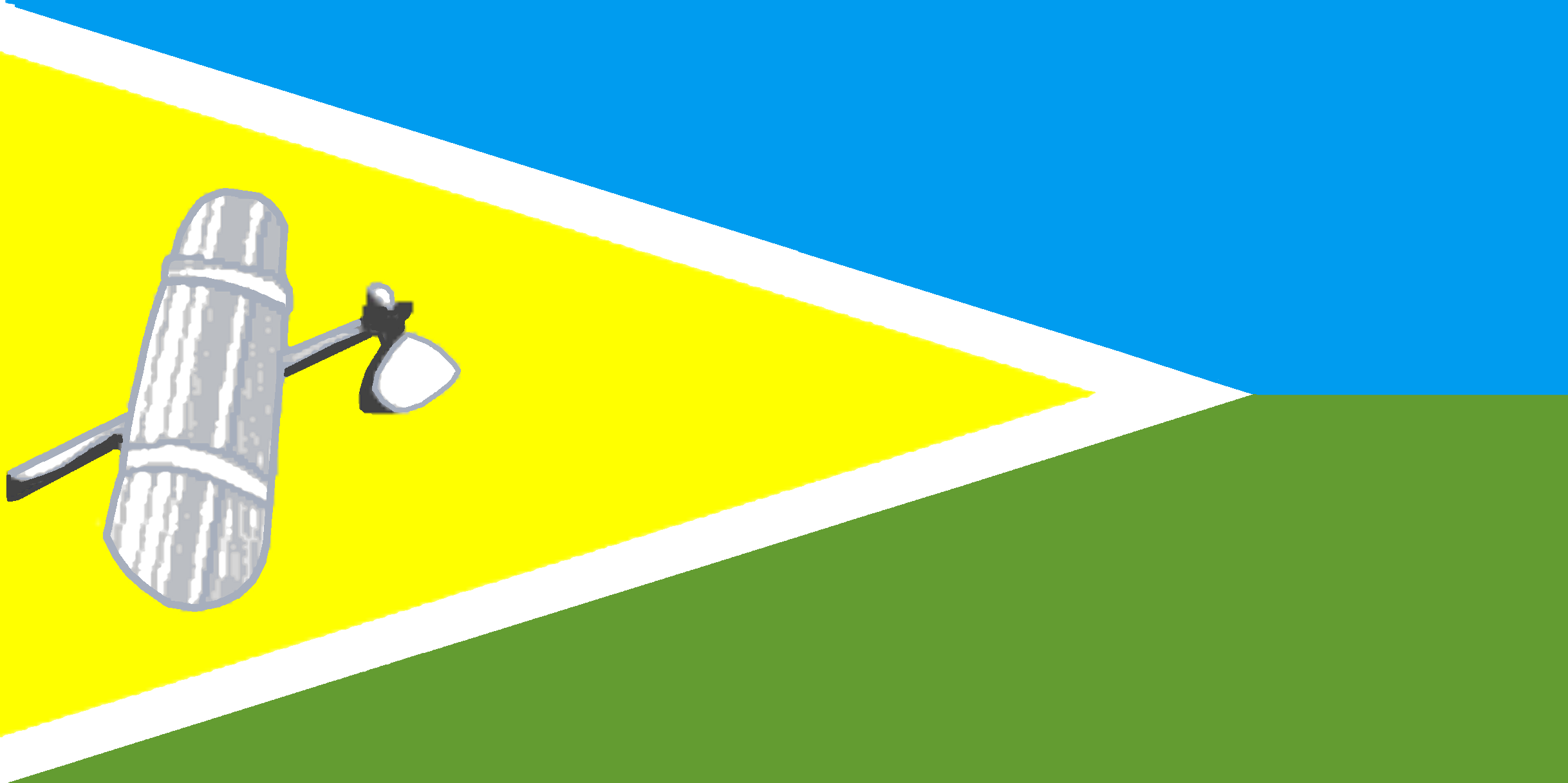
- Flag

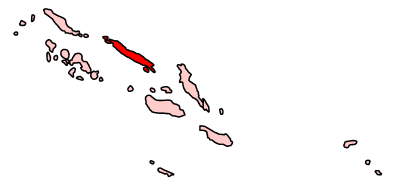
- Coordinates: 8°0′S 159°30′E
- Country: Solomon Islands
- Capital: Buala

Government
  - Premier: Hon. Lawrence Hayward

Area
  - Total: 4,136 km^{2} (1,597 sq mi)

Population (2019 census)
  - Total: 31,420
  - Density: 7.597/km^{2} (19.68/sq mi)
- Time zone: UTC+11 (+11)
- ISO 3166 code: SB-IS

Isabel Province (also spelled Ysabel) is one of the provinces of Solomon Islands. The province had a population of around 31,420 as of 2019, mostly concentrated on the main island, Santa Isabel Island. The capital of the province is Buala on Santa Isabel Island, which has scheduled airline services to Honiara on Solomon Airlines from Fera Airport, on Fera Island, a 15-minute boat ride from Buala.

The province has an economy dominated by subsistence agriculture with occasional plantations for cash crops such as copra, and by logging activities. The province is seldom visited by tourists due to poor infrastructure, lack of roads, hotels, modern medical care, and endemic malaria. Most areas have a "Rest House", a house where guests can seek accommodation for the night or two, but many residents are willing to take in visitors for the night.

Santa Isabel is the longest Island in Solomon Islands. The first European contact to the Solomon Islands was made by Spanish navigator Álvaro de Mendaña de Neira in 1568, who gave them their name because he left Spain on Santa Isabella's day. The highest point is Mount Kubonitu, also known as Mount Sasari at 1,120 metres (3,670 ft).

== Administrative divisions ==
Isabel Province is sub-divided into the following constituencies (or electoral districts), which are further sub-divided into wards (with populations at the 2009 and 2019 Censuses respectively):

Name		Population (2009 census)			Population (2019 census)		
Name		Total	Male	Female	Total	Male	Female
13. – Hograno/Kia/Havulei		9,472	4,893	4,579	11,688	6,313	5,375
13.01.	Kia	1,929	1,054	875	1,909	1,008	901
13.02.	Baolo/Havulei	1,148	599	549	1,808	1,020	788
13.13.	Kolomola	949	460	489	1,164	583	581
13.14.	Kolotubi	1,671	811	860	1,980	1,018	962
13.15.	Susubona	1,907	954	953	2,342	1,235	1,107
13.16.	Samasodu/Katova	1,868	1,015	853	2,485	1,449	1,036
14. – Maringe/Kokota		9,763	4,995	4,768	11,557	6,161	5,396
14.03.	Kokota	1,177	692	485	1,671	1,016	655
14.04.	Hovikoilo	1,988	1,016	972	2,462	1,347	1,115
14.05.	Buala	2,813	1,456	1,357	3,369	1,748	1,621
14.06.	Tirotongana	683	342	341	693	357	336
14.07.	Koviloko	1,240	579	661	1,144	558	586
14.08.	Kmaga	1,862	910	952	2,218	1,135	1,083
15. – Gao/Bugotu		6,923	3,440	3,483	8,175	4,153	4,022
15.09.	Kaloka	959	466	493	1,238	612	626
15.10.	Tatamba	1,404	717	687	1,649	865	784
15.11.	Sigana	2,397	1,195	1,202	2,691	1,317	1,374
15.12.	Japuana	2,163	1,062	1,101	2,597	1,359	1,238
Total		26,158	13,328	12,830	31,420	16,627	14,793

== Islands ==
- Arnarvon
- Kerehikapa
- Fera Island
- Maleivona
- Onogou Island
- Ramos
- San Jorge
- Santa Isabel
- Sikopo
- Mahige
- Barora Fa'a
- Barora Ite
- Papatura F'a
- Papatura Ite

== Notable people ==
- Jeremiah Manele – Prime Minister in 2024-2026, born in Santa Isabel
