= 23rd meridian west =

Line of longitude

23rd meridian west

The meridian 23° west of Greenwich is a line of longitude that extends from the North Pole across the Arctic Ocean, Greenland, Iceland, the Atlantic Ocean, the Southern Ocean, and Antarctica to the South Pole.

The 23rd meridian west forms a great circle with the 157th meridian east.

== From Pole to Pole ==
Starting at the North Pole and heading south to the South Pole, the 23rd meridian west passes through:

Co-ordinates	Country, territory or sea	Notes
90°0′N 23°0′W	Arctic Ocean	
82°48′N 23°0′W	Greenland	Herlufsholm Strand (Peary Land)
82°17′N 23°0′W	Independence Fjord	
82°0′N 23°0′W	Greenland	Passing through Danmark Fjord
73°20′N 23°0′W	Kejser Franz Joseph Fjord	
73°9′N 23°0′W	Greenland	Ymer Island, Geographical Society Island and Traill Island
72°16′N 23°0′W	King Oscar Fjord	
72°1′N 23°0′W	Greenland	Jameson Land peninsula
70°26′N 23°0′W	Scoresby Sund	
70°5′N 23°0′W	Greenland	
69°45′N 23°0′W	Atlantic Ocean	Greenland Sea
66°26′N 23°0′W	Iceland	Westfjords peninsula
66°17′N 23°0′W	Ísafjarðardjúp	
66°5′N 23°0′W	Iceland	Westfjords peninsula
65°33′N 23°0′W	Breiðafjörður	
65°1′N 23°0′W	Iceland	Snæfellsnes peninsula
64°48′N 23°0′W	Atlantic Ocean	Passing just west of the island of Sal, Cape Verde (at 16°48′N 22°59′W); Passing just west of the island of Boa Vista, Cape Verde (at 16°2′N 22°58′W); Passing just east of the island of Maio, Cape Verde (at 15°10′N 23°6′W)
60°0′S 23°0′W	Southern Ocean	
74°18′S 23°0′W	Antarctica	British Antarctic Territory, claimed by United Kingdom

== See also ==
- 22nd meridian west
- 24th meridian west
