= 24th meridian west =

Line of longitude

24th meridian west

The meridian 24° west of Greenwich is a line of longitude that extends from the North Pole across the Arctic Ocean, Greenland, Iceland, the Atlantic Ocean, the Southern Ocean, and Antarctica to the South Pole.

The 24th meridian west forms a great circle with the 156th meridian east.

== From Pole to Pole ==
Starting at the North Pole and heading south to the South Pole, the 24th meridian west passes through:

Co-ordinates	Country, territory or sea	Notes
90°0′N 24°0′W	Arctic Ocean	
82°55′N 24°0′W	Greenland	Herluf Trolle Land (Peary Land)
82°16′N 24°0′W	Independence Fjord and Hagen Fjord	
78°0′N 24°0′W	Greenland	Alabama Nunatak
73°35′N 24°0′W	Kejser Franz Joseph Fjord	
73°23′N 24°0′W	Greenland	Ymer Island, Geographical Society Island and Traill Island
72°28′N 24°0′W	King Oscar Fjord	
72°16′N 24°0′W	Greenland	Jameson Land peninsula
70°39′N 24°0′W	Scoresby Sund	
70°9′N 24°0′W	Greenland	
69°36′N 24°0′W	Atlantic Ocean	Greenland Sea
65°47′N 24°0′W	Iceland	Westfjords peninsula
65°28′N 24°0′W	Breiðafjörður	
64°53′N 24°0′W	Iceland	Snæfellsnes peninsula
64°49′N 24°0′W	Atlantic Ocean	Passing just east of the island of São Nicolau, Cape Verde (at 16°34′N 24°1′W); Passing just west of the island of Santiago, Cape Verde (at 15°4′N 23°47′W); Passing just east of the island of Fogo, Cape Verde (at 14°52′N 24°17′W)
60°0′S 24°0′W	Southern Ocean	
74°33′S 24°0′W	Antarctica	British Antarctic Territory, claimed by United Kingdom
74°42′S 24°0′W	Southern Ocean	Weddell Sea
74°55′S 24°0′W	Antarctica	British Antarctic Territory, claimed by United Kingdom

== See also ==
- 23rd meridian west
- 25th meridian west
