= Sikopo =

Island in Solomon Islands

Coordinates: 7.445°S 157.976°E

Sikopo is an island in Solomon Islands; part of the Arnarvon Islands in Isabel Province. It lies in Manning Strait, which is between Choiseul Island and Santa Isabel Island, and which connects New Georgia Sound to the Pacific. The strait is named for Captain Edward Manning, of Pitt, who was the first European to sail through the straits and chart it in 1792.
