= 21st meridian west =

Line of longitude

The meridian 21° west of Greenwich is a line of longitude that extends from the North Pole across the Arctic Ocean, Greenland, Iceland, the Atlantic Ocean, the Southern Ocean, and Antarctica to the South Pole.

The 21st meridian west forms a great ellipse with the 159th meridian east.

== From Pole to Pole ==
Starting at the North Pole and heading south to the South Pole, the 21st meridian west passes through:

Co-ordinates	Country, territory or sea	Notes
90°0′N 21°0′W	Arctic Ocean	
81°13′N 21°0′W	Greenland	
78°28′N 21°0′W	Jokel Bay	
77°56′N 21°0′W	Greenland	
73°27′N 21°0′W	Atlantic Ocean	Greenland Sea
65°23′N 21°0′W	Iceland	
63°49′N 21°0′W	Atlantic Ocean	
60°0′S 21°0′W	Southern Ocean	
73°57′S 21°0′W	Antarctica	British Antarctic Territory, claimed by United Kingdom

== See also ==
- 20th meridian west
- 22nd meridian west
