= Chesterfield Islands =

Pacific archipelago of New Caledonia

- Interactive map of Chesterfield Islands

Administration
- New Caledonia (France)
- Provinces: North Province, South Province

Demographics
- Population: Uninhabited

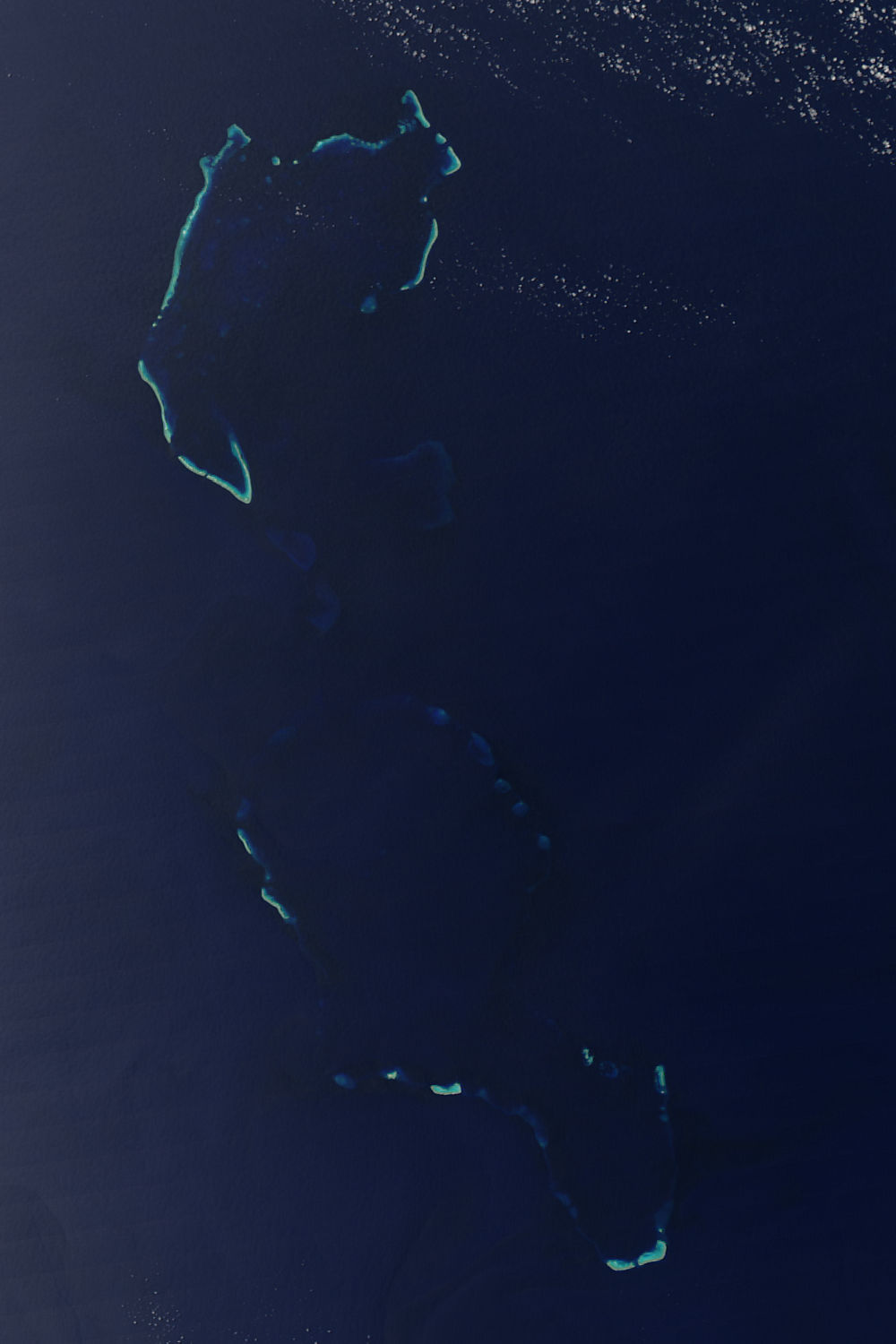
Chesterfield Islands from space

The Chesterfield Islands (îles Chesterfield in French) are a French archipelago of New Caledonia located in the Coral Sea, 550 km (300 nmi) northwest of Grande Terre, the main island of New Caledonia. The archipelago is 120 km long and 70 km broad, made up of 11 uninhabited islets and many reefs. The land area of the islands is less than 10 km^{2}.

During periods of lowered sea level during the Pleistocene ice ages, an island of considerable size (Greater Chesterfield Island) occupied the location of the archipelago.

Bellona Reef, 164 km south-southeast of Chesterfield, is geologically separated from the Chesterfield archipelago but commonly included.

== Etymology ==
The reef complex is named after the whaling ship Chesterfield, commanded by Matthew Bowes Alt, which sailed through the Coral Sea in the 1790s.

== Location ==
The Chesterfield Islands, sometimes referred to as the Chesterfield Reefs or Chesterfield Group, are the most important of a number of uninhabited coral sand cays. Some are awash and liable to shift with the wind while others are stabilized by the growth of grass, creepers and low trees. The reefs extend from 19˚ to 22˚S between 158–160˚E in the southern Coral Sea halfway between Australia and New Caledonia. The Chesterfield Reefs are now part of the territory of New Caledonia while the islands farther west are part of the Australian Coral Sea Islands Territory.

Chesterfield lagoon, located between 19˚00' and 20˚30' S and 158˚10' and 159˚E covers an area of approximately 3500 km^{2}. A barrier reef surrounds the lagoon, interrupted by wide passes except on its eastern side where it is open for over 20 nautical miles (37 km). The major part of the lagoon is exposed to trade winds and to the southeastern oceanic swell. The lagoon is relatively deep with a mean depth of 51 m. The depth increases from south to north.

Chesterfield Reefs complex consists of the Bellona Reef complex to the south (South, Middle and Northwest Bellona Reef) and the Bampton Reef complex.

=== Bellona Reefs ===
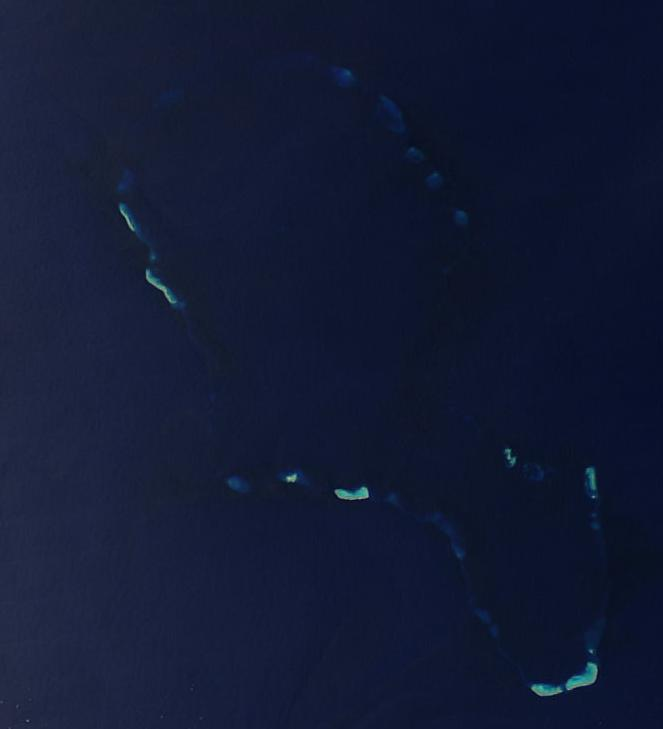
Bellona Reefs

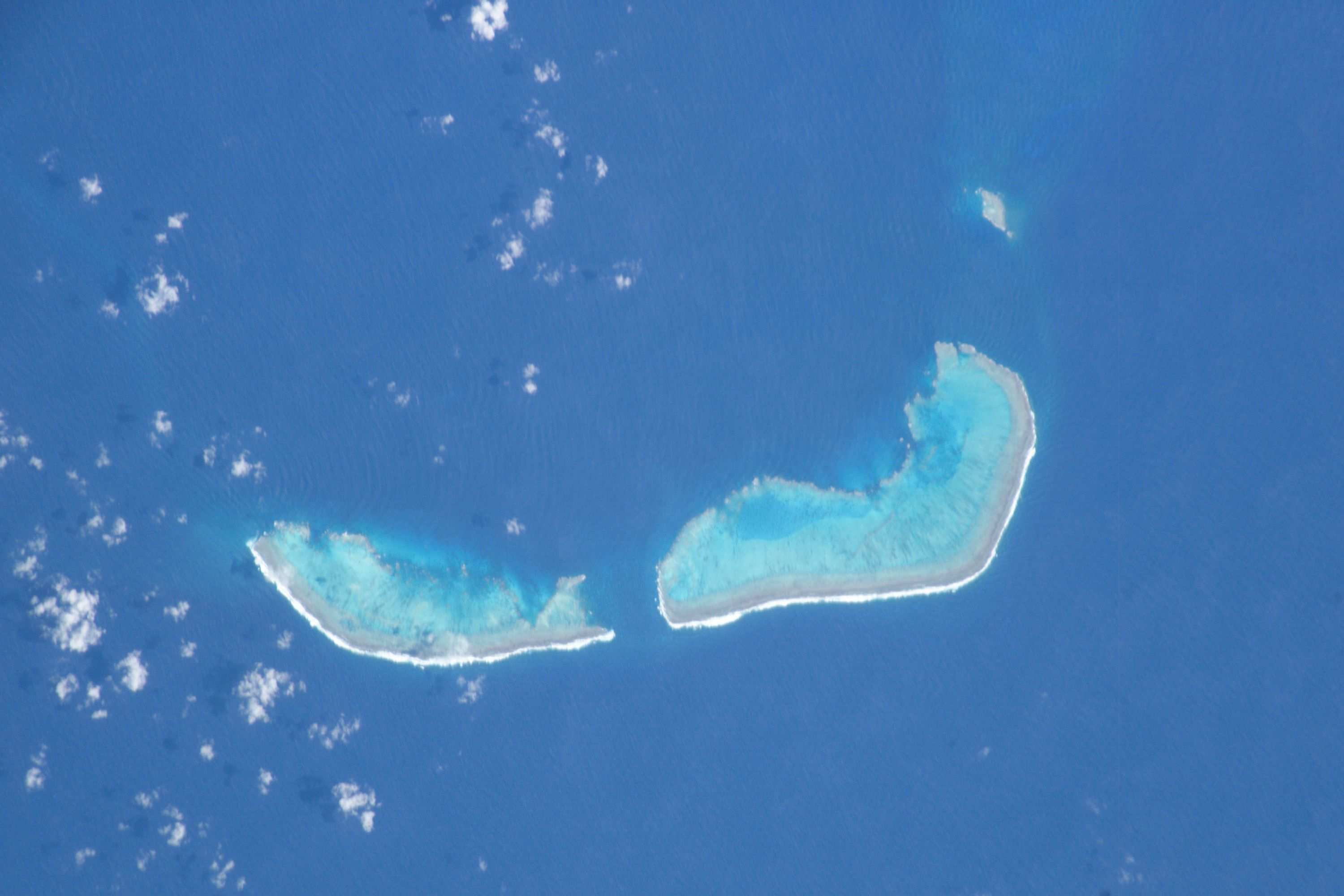
South Bellona Reefs

Captain Matthew Boyd of Bellona named the reefs for his ship. He had delivered convicts to New South Wales in 1793 and was on his way to China to pick up a cargo at Canton to take back to Britain for the British East India Company when he passed the reefs in February–March 1793.

- West Point 21°52′S 159°25′E,
- Olry Reef 21°26′S 159°34′E, on the south an unvegetated sand cay Caye Est Bellona
- Middle Bellona Reefs 21°25′S 158°25′E,
- Observatory Cay 21°24′S 158°51′E,
- Booby Reef 21°01′S 158°34′E,
- Northwest Bellona Reef 20°52′S 158°28′E,
- Noel Bank 20°32′S 158°34′E,
- South Bellona Reef or West Point 21°52′S 159°25′E, Approximately 3 m tall sand islet, reported to be non-existent by 1988 (Sailing Directions)

Lieutenant John Lamb, R.N., Commander of the ship Baring, spent three days in the neighborhood of Booby and Bellona Shoals and reefs. Lamb took soundings between nineteen and forty-five fathoms (114–270 ft), and frequently passed shoals, upon which the sea was breaking. Lamb defined the limits of the rocky ground as the parallels of 20°40' and 21°50' and the meridians of 158°15' and 159°30'. He also saw a sandy islet, surrounded by a chain of rocks, at 21°24½′ south and 158°30' east. The ship Minerva measured the water's depth as eight fathoms (48 ft), with the appearance of shallower water to the southwest; this last danger is in a line between the two shoals at about longitude 159°20' east, as described by James Horsburgh.

Observatory Cay (Caye de l'Observatoire) 21°24′S 158°51′E, 800 m long and 2 m high, lies on the Middle Bellona Reefs at the southern end of the Chesterfield Reefs and 180 nm east of Kenn Reef.

=== Minerva Shoal ===
- Minerva Shoal20°55′S 159°22′E,

=== Chesterfield Reefs ===
- South Elbow or Loop Islet19°59′S 158°28′E,
- Anchorage Islets 19°54′S 158°28′E,
- Passage Islet (Bennett Islet)19°55′S 158°22′E,
- Long Island 19°53′S 158°19′E,

The Chesterfield Reefs is a loose collection of elongated reefs that enclose a deep, semi-sheltered, lagoon. The reefs on the west and northwest are known as the Chesterfield Reefs; those on the east and north being the Bampton Reefs. The The Chesterfield Reefs form a structure measuring 120 km in length (northeast to southwest) and 70 km across (east to west).

There are numerous cays occurring amongst the reefs of both the Chesterfield and Bampton Reefs. These include: Loop Islet, Renard Cay, Skeleton Cay, Bennett Island, Passage Islet, Veys Islet, Long Island, the Avon Isles, the Anchorage Islets and Bampton Island.

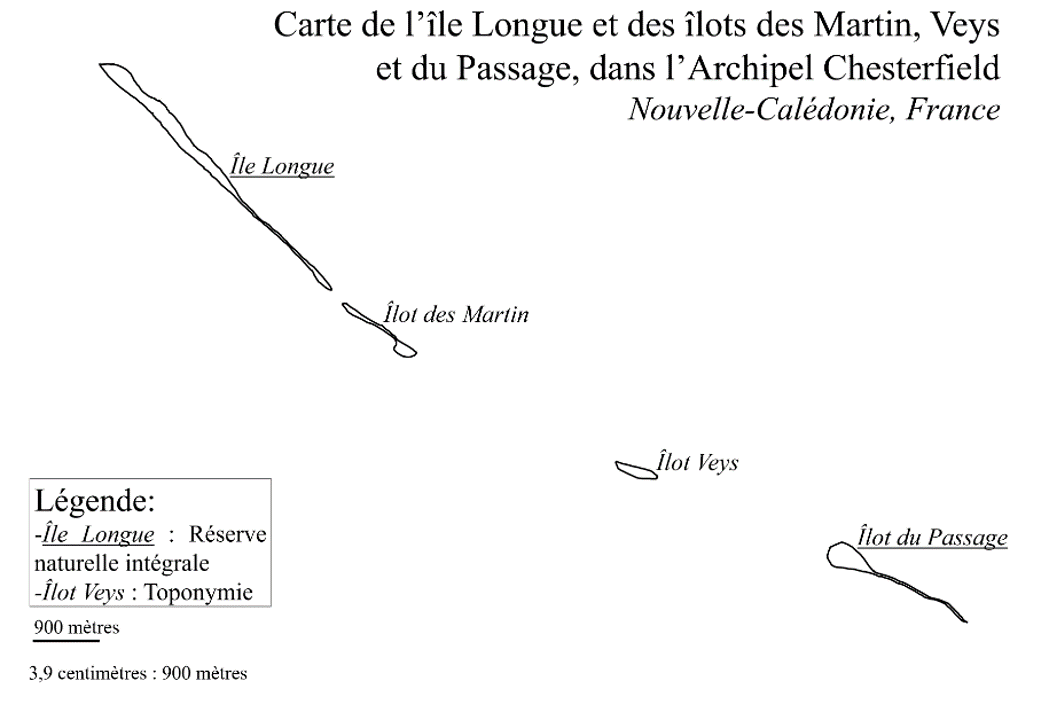
Map of Long Island and Martin, Veys and Passage Islands

Long Island 19°53′S 158°19′E, 10 nm NW of Loop Islet, is the largest of the Chesterfield Islands, and is 1400 to 1800 m long but no more than 100 m across and 9 m high. In May 1859 Henry Mangles Denham found Long Island was "a heap of 'foraminifera' densely covered with stunted bush‑trees with leaves as large as cabbage plants, spreading 12 feet (3.7 m) and reaching as high, upon trunks 9 inches (23 cm) diameter... The trees around the margin of this island were leafless, as if from the sea‑fowl." Although wooded in the 1850s, it was stripped during guano extraction in the 1870s and was said to be covered in grass with only two coconut trees and some ruins at the south end early in the 20th century. The vegetation was growing again by 1957 when the remaining ruins were confused with those of a temporary automatic meteorological station established in the same area by the Americans between 1944 and 1948. Terry Walker reported that by 1990 there was a ring of low Tournefortia trees growing around the margin, herbs, grass and shrubs in the interior, and still a few exotic species including coconuts.

South of Long Island and Loop Islet there are three small low islets (Martin, Veys and Passage islets) up to 400 m across followed, after a narrow channel, by Passage or Bennett Island, which is 12 m high and was a whaling station in the first half of the 20th century. Several sand cays lie on the reef southeast of the islet.

=== Avon Isles ===
- Avon Isles (Northwest Point) 19°32′S 158°15′E,
- Avon Isles (south)

The two Avon Isles 19°32′S 158°15′E, some 188 m in diameter and 5 m high to the top of the dense vegetation, are situated 21 n.m. north of Long Island. They were seen by Mr. Sumner, Master of the ship Avon, on 18 September 1823, and are described by him as being three-quarters of a mile in circumference, twenty feet high, and the sea between them twenty fathoms deep. At four miles (7 km) northeast by north from them the water was twelve fathoms (72 feet) deep, and at the same time they saw a reef ten or fifteen miles (20–30 km) to the southeast, with deep water between it and the islets. A boat landed on the south-westernmost islet, and found it inhabited only by birds, but clothed with shrubs and wild grapes. By observation, these islands were found to lie in latitude 19 degrees 40 minutes, and longitude 158 degrees 6 minutes. The Avon Isles are described by Denham in 1859 as "densely covered with stunted trees and creeping plants and grass, and... crowded with the like species of birds."

=== Bampton Reefs ===
- Bampton Reefs
- Bampton Island 19°07′S 158°36′E,
- North Bampton Reef 19°03′S 158°43′E,
- Northeast Bampton Reef 19°06′S 159°03′E,
- Renard Island 19°14′S 158°58′E,
- Skeleton Cay 19°27′S 158°57′E

Renard Island North Bampton Reef 19°14′S 158°58′E, Approximately 6 m (20 ft) tall sand islet lies 45 nmi (83 km) northeast of the Avon Isles and is 273 m (896 ft) long, 180 m (590 ft) across and also 6 m (20 ft) high to the top of the bushes.

Southeast Bampton Reef 19°08′S 158°40′E Sand Cay 5 m (16 ft) elevation

Loop Islet 19°59′S 158°28′E, which lies 85 nm farther north near the south end of the central islands of Chesterfield Reefs, is a small, flat, bushy islet 3 m high where a permanent automatic weather station was established by the Service Météorologique de Nouméa in October 1968. Terry Walker reported the presence of a grove of Casuarinas in 1990.

Anchorage Islets are a group of islets five nautical miles (9 km) north of Loop Islet. The third from the north, about 400 m long and 12 m high, shelters the best anchorage.

Passage (Bonnet) Island reaches a vegetative height of 12 m

Bampton Island 19°07′S 158°36′E, lies on Bampton Reefs 20 nm NW of Renard Island. It is 180 m long, 110 m across and 5 m high. It had trees when discovered in 1793, but has seldom been visited since then except by castaways.

The reefs and islands west of the Chesterfield Islands, the closest being Mellish Reef with Herald's Beacon Islet at 17°25′S 155°52′E, at a distance of 180 nm northwest of Bampton Island, belong to the Coral Sea Islands Territory.

== Important Bird Area ==
The Bampton and Chesterfield Reef Islands, with their surrounding waters, have been recognised as an Important Bird Area (IBA) by BirdLife International because they support breeding colonies of several species of seabirds, including lesser frigatebirds, red-footed and brown boobies, brown and black noddies, and fairy terns.

== History ==
=== 18th Century ===
Booby Reef in the center of the eastern chain of reefs and islets comprising Chesterfield Reefs appears to have been discovered first by Lt. Henry Lidgbird Ball in HMS Supply on the way from Sydney to Batavia (modern day Jakarta) in 1790. The reefs to the south were found next by Mathew Boyd in the convict ship Bellona on his way from Sydney to Canton (modern day Guangzhou) in February or March 1793. The following June, William Wright Bampton became embayed for five days at the north end of Chesterfield Reefs in the Indiaman Shah Hormuzeer, together with Mathew Bowes Alt in the whaler Chesterfield. Bampton reported two islets with trees and "a number of birds of different species around the ships, several of them the same kind as at Norfolk Island”.

=== 19th Century ===
The reefs continued to present a hazard to shipping plying between Australia and Canton or India (where cargo was collected on the way home to Europe). The southern reefs were surveyed by Captain Henry Mangles Denham in the Herald from 1858 to 1860. He made the natural history notes discussed below. The northern reefs were charted by Lieutenant G.E.Richards in HMS Renard in 1878 and the French the following year. Denham's conclusions are engraved on British Admiralty Chart 349:

These Plans and a mast‑head Lookout will enable a Ship to round to under the lee of the Reefs where she may caulk topsides, set up rigging, rate Chronometers, [and] obtain turtle, fish and seafowl eggs. On some of the more salient reefs, beacons were erected by Capt. Denham, and for the sake of castaways, cocoa‑nuts, shrubs, grasses & every description of seed likely to grow, were sown in the way to promote the superstructure; and it is most desirable that these Refuge‑ spots should be held sacred for universal benefit and not ruthlessly destroyed by the Guano‑seeker.

The area is a wintering ground for numerous humpback whales and smaller numbers of sperm whales. During the 19th century the Chesterfield Islands were visited by increasing numbers of whalers during the off season in New Zealand. L. Thiercelin reported that in July 1863 the islets only had two or three plants, including a bush 3–4 m high, and were frequented by turtles weighing 60 to 100 kg. Many eggs were being taken regularly by several English, two French and one American whaler. On another occasion there were no less than eight American whalers. A collection of birds said to have been made by Surgeon Jourde of the French whaler Général d’Hautpoul on the Brampton Shoals in July 1861 was subsequently brought by Gerard Krefft (1862) to the Australian Museum, but clearly not all the specimens came from there.

On 27 October 1862, the British Government granted an exclusive concession to exploit the guano on Lady Elliot Island, Wreck Reef, Swain Reefs, Raine Island, Bramble Cay, Brampton Shoal, and Pilgrim Island to the Anglo Australian Guano Company organized by the whaler Dr. William Crowther in Hobart, Tasmania. They were apparently most active on Bird Islet (Wreck Reef) and Lady Elliot and Raine Islands (Hutchinson, 1950), losing five ships at Bird Islet between 1861 and 1882 (Crowther 1939). It is not clear that they ever took much guano from the Chesterfield Islands unless it was obtained from Higginson, Desmazures et Cie, discussed below.

When in 1877 Joshua William North also found guano on the Chesterfield Reefs, Alcide Jean Desmazures persuaded Governor Orly of New Caledonia to send the warship La Seudre to annex them. There were estimated to be about 185,000 cu m of guano on Long Island and a few hundred tons elsewhere, and 40% to 62% phosphate (Chevron, 1880), which was extracted between 1879 and 1888 by Higginson, Desmazures et Cie of Nouméa (Godard, nd), leaving Long Island stripped bare for a time (Anon., 1916).

=== 20th and 21st Century ===
Apparently the islands were then abandoned until Commander Arzur in the French warship Dumont d’Urville surveyed the Chesterfield Reefs and erected a plaque in 1939. In September 1944, American forces installed a temporary automatic meteorological station at the south end of Long Island, which was abandoned again at the end of World War II.

The first biological survey was made of Long Island by Cohic during four hours ashore on 26 September 1957. It revealed, among other things, a variety of avian parasites including a widespread Ornithodoros tick belonging to a genus carrying arboviruses capable of causing illness in humans. This island and the Anchorage Islets were also visited briefly during a survey of New Caledonian coral reefs in 1960 and 1962.

An aerial magnetic survey was made of the Chesterfield area in 1966, and a seismic survey in 1972, which apparently have not been followed up yet. In November 1968 another automatic meteorological station was installed on Loop Islet where 10 plants were collected by A.E. Ferré. Since then the Centre de Nouméa of the Office de la Recherche Scientifique et Technique Outre Mer has arranged for periodic surveys and others when this installation is serviced.

From 1982 to 1992 Terry Walker carried out methodical surveys of the Coral Sea islets with the intention of producing a seabird atlas. He visited the central islands of the Chesterfield Reefs in December 1990.

An amateur radio DX-pedition (TX3X) was conducted on one of the islands in October 2015.

== Known Shipwrecks on the Reef ==
Unless otherwise noted, information in this section is from Coral Sea and Northern Great Barrier Reef Shipwrecks.

Vessel	Type	Length (ft)	Beam (ft)	Draft (ft)	Date Launched	Date Wrecked	Notes
Borough Belle	Wooden Brigantine	103.8	24.1	11.8	1875	30 January 1894	210 tons. Built in Sydney. The brigantine had been badly damaged by gales and she was run ashore onto Bellona Reefs to save life on a voyage from Solomon Islands to Sydney. The crew remained at the wreck until 3 February, then set out for Australia. At an inquiry the master and part owner John Williams was commended for his able seamanship.
Chesterfield	Whaler				1791		Gave its name to Chesterfield Reef.
Clarence	Whaling brig	68	19.2	11	1841	9 June 1844	120 tons. Built at Clarence River, New South Wales. Registered at Sydney 46/1841. Captain McCardell. Lost on the Chesterfield Bank, near the Bampton Shoals. After a voyage of 600 nautical miles (1,100 km) in four boats the crew reached safety although some of the crew were speared when they landed on the Queensland coast in search of water. The whaler Woodlark assisted in the rescue of one of the boats. The schooner Elizabeth was lost attempting to salvage the Clarence the following year.
Eillan Donan	Brigantine				1863	Late December 1893	270 tons. Registered in Auckland. Believed lost on Chesterfield Reefs. The vessel was likely named for the home of the clan McRae, Eilean Donan Castle. This is one of the most photographed castles in Scotland.
Elizabeth	Schooner					1844	Lost on Chesterfield Bank, near the Bampton Shoals. While attempting to salvage the wreck of the Clarence the Elizabeth was driven out to sea while most of her crew were working on the wreck. She was never seen again. The crew reached Moreton Bay, Queensland by longboat on 26 March 1845.
Euromedha	Barque				1868	2 October 1869	345 tons. Built in Sunderland, England. Struck the eastern edge of Bampton Reef and sank rapidly. The crew was saved.
Hamlet's Ghost	Boat						Small vessel built from the salvaged timbers from the whaling schooner Prince of Denmark, wrecked on Chesterfield reef in 1863. [Holthouse]
Isabella	Barque	159	32.2	21	1860	4 July 1875	734 tons. Built in Sunderland. Master Captain Smith. Wrecked on Chesterfield Reef while en route from Newcastle NSW (departed 26 June) to Hong Kong. Crew of 16 with an additional 17 Chinese passengers on board as well as 800 tons of coal. One boat containing the captain and nine men set out for the mainland, six landed on an island and decided to await rescue while the seventeen Chinese passengers remained at the wreck. The captain's boat was rescued by the Currambene and taken to Bowen, Queensland but the other survivors were apparently forgotten. On 2 January 1876, the Laura Lind found only three of the six remaining white men alive when the schooner called at the island. Of the Chinese, ten were drowned, one died of starvation and one committed suicide because he could not obtain any opium. The Marine Board of Queensland found a fault in the chronometers had caused an error of more than 60 nautical miles (110 km) in the position of the ship and the master was exonerated.
Jessie	Wooden Barkentine	124	25.1	12.8		18 February 1893	247 tons. During a cyclone she was forced ashore at Long Island while loading guano for Launceston, Tasmania. Dangerous conditions forced her crew to seek shelter on the island, and when the weather cleared all that remained of their vessel were a few pieces of wreckage. The master and crew reached Nouméa in one of the boats.
Madeira Packet	Schooner					December 1831	108 tons. Captain Arnold. Left Sydney for New Zealand on a whaling cruise, on 4 September 1831; wrecked on Bampton Reefs. The crew took to three boats; two made it safely to Moreton Bay, the third disappeared. It appears that Captain Arnold had died on board before her loss.
Peruvian	Barque					February or March 1846	Lost at Minerva or Bellona Reefs. Carrying a load of timber, battered by heavy weather and wrecked on the reefs.
Prince of Denmark	Whaling Schooner				1789	19 March 1863	69 tons. Captain J.B. Bennett. Wrecked during a gale while approaching Chesterfield Reef. The crew used the remains of the whaler to build a new boat (which they called Hamlet's Ghost), then set sail for Brisbane, leaving eleven native members of the crew on the reef with provisions for about eighteen months. They made Moreton bay on 17 June. The boat was later converted to a pleasure yacht. There is no record of what happened to the eleven natives. [Holthouse]
Sarah S. Ridgeway	Wooden Barque						831 tons. American Registered at Wilmington, Delaware on 29 January 1895. The ship was lost on Bellona Reef while on her way from Newcastle to Singapore with coal. There was no loss of life and the crew landed at Burnett Heads, Queensland.
Siskin	Wooden Ketch	61.3	17.6	5.5	1884	Early November 1896	41 tons. Built at Balmain, New South Wales. Left Brisbane on a voyage to the Solomon Islands. Lost on the Chesterfield Group.
Tamar	Barque					1870	Lost near Chesterfield Reefs.
Thule	Whaler					10 October 1844	American, Capt. Coffin, from Nantucket, Connecticut. After 27 months at sea with 1050 barrels of sperm oil, she struck a shoal believed to be part of Bellona Reef on 10 Oct 1844.
Venture	Schooner	65.4	20.8	7	1875	August 1879	54 tons. Lost on Chesterfield Reefs.
Waireta	Schooner				1884		99 tons. Built in 1884 and registered at Auckland, New Zealand, on 21 May 1892. While landing machinery at Long Island she parted her cables in heavy weather and went ashore. A court of inquiry decided that she would not have been lost if she had been better found in ground tackle.
Fotini Carras	Screw Steamer	375.6	51.7	26.5	26 September 1918	7 June 1939	4453 Gross tons. Built in 1918 as the War Fantail in Glasgow and going through several owners and changes of names, the Fotini Carras struck Middle Bellona Reef. The Dutch ship Australlen picked up after being relayed to the site of the incident via the deputy director of navigation in Brisbane.
