= 157th meridian east =

Line of longitude

157th meridian east

The meridian 157° east of Greenwich is a line of longitude that extends from the North Pole across the Arctic Ocean, Asia, the Pacific Ocean, Australasia, the Southern Ocean, and Antarctica to the South Pole.

The 157th meridian east forms a great circle with the 23rd meridian west.

== From Pole to Pole ==
Starting at the North Pole and heading south to the South Pole, the 157th meridian east passes through:

| Co-ordinates | Country, territory or sea | Notes |
|---|---|---|
| 90°0′N 157°0′E | Arctic Ocean | Passing just east of Henrietta Island, Sakha Republic, Russia (at 77°6′N 156°43′E) |
| 77°2′N 157°0′E | East Siberian Sea | |
| 71°5′N 157°0′E | Russia | Sakha Republic; Magadan Oblast — from 66°1′N 157°0′E |
| 61°35′N 157°0′E | Sea of Okhotsk | Shelikhov Gulf |
| 57°51′N 157°0′E | Russia | Kamchatka Krai — Kamchatka Peninsula |
| 51°5′N 157°0′E | Pacific Ocean | |
| 4°42′S 157°0′E | Papua New Guinea | Takuu atoll |
| 4°48′S 157°0′E | Pacific Ocean | |
| 6°53′S 157°0′E | Solomon Islands | Choiseul Island |
| 7°16′S 157°0′E | New Georgia Sound | |
| 7°52′S 157°0′E | Solomon Islands | Island of Kolombangara |
| 8°6′S 157°0′E | Solomon Sea | Passing just west of Vonavona Island, Solomon Islands (at 8°11′N 157°0′E) |
| 11°47′S 157°0′E | Coral Sea | |
| 29°57′S 157°0′E | Pacific Ocean | |
| 60°0′S 157°0′E | Southern Ocean | |
| 69°12′S 157°0′E | Antarctica | Australian Antarctic Territory, claimed by Australia |

== See also ==
- 156th meridian east
- 158th meridian east
