= Maleivona =

Island in Solomon Islands

Coordinates: 7.4838°S 158.0506°E

Maleivona is an island in Solomon Islands; it is located in Isabel Province.
