= 22nd meridian west =

Line of longitude

22nd meridian west

The meridian 22° west of Greenwich is a line of longitude that extends from the North Pole across the Arctic Ocean, Greenland, Iceland, the Atlantic Ocean, the Southern Ocean, and Antarctica to the South Pole.

The 22nd meridian west forms a great circle with the 158th meridian east.

== From Pole to Pole ==
Starting at the North Pole and heading south to the South Pole, the 22nd meridian west passes through:

Co-ordinates	Country, territory or sea	Notes
90°0′N 22°0′W	Arctic Ocean	
82°42′N 22°0′W	Greenland	Peary Land peninsula
82°28′N 22°0′W	Independence Fjord	
81°14′N 22°0′W	Greenland	Passing through Danmark Fjord and Gael Hamke Bay
73°19′N 22°0′W	Foster Bay	
72°56′N 22°0′W	Greenland	Geographical Society Island and Traill Island
72°24′N 22°0′W	Atlantic Ocean	Greenland Sea
71°44′N 22°0′W	Greenland	Jameson Land peninsula
70°29′N 22°0′W	Atlantic Ocean	Greenland Sea
66°16′N 22°0′W	Iceland	Westfjords peninsula
65°31′N 22°0′W	Breiðafjörður	
65°23′N 22°0′W	Iceland	
65°6′N 22°0′W	Breiðafjörður	
65°1′N 22°0′W	Iceland	
64°18′N 22°0′W	Faxaflói	
64°9′N 22°0′W	Iceland	Passing just west of Reykjavík
63°50′N 22°0′W	Atlantic Ocean	
60°0′S 22°0′W	Southern Ocean	
74°9′S 22°0′W	Antarctica	British Antarctic Territory, claimed by United Kingdom

== See also ==
- 21st meridian west
- 23rd meridian west
