= Bughotu language =

Austronesian language spoken in Solomon Islands

Bughotu
- Native to: Central Solomon Islands
- Region: Santa Isabel (island), Furona Island
- Native speakers: (4,100 cited 1999)
- Language family: Austronesian: Malayo-Polynesian; Oceanic; Southeast Solomonic; Gela–Guadalcanal; Gela; Bughotu

Language codes
- ISO 639-3: bgt
- Glottolog: bugh1239

Bughotu (also spelled Bugotu) is an Oceanic language spoken in Solomon Islands. Its speakers live on the island of Santa Isabel and on the small neighbouring Furona Island.
