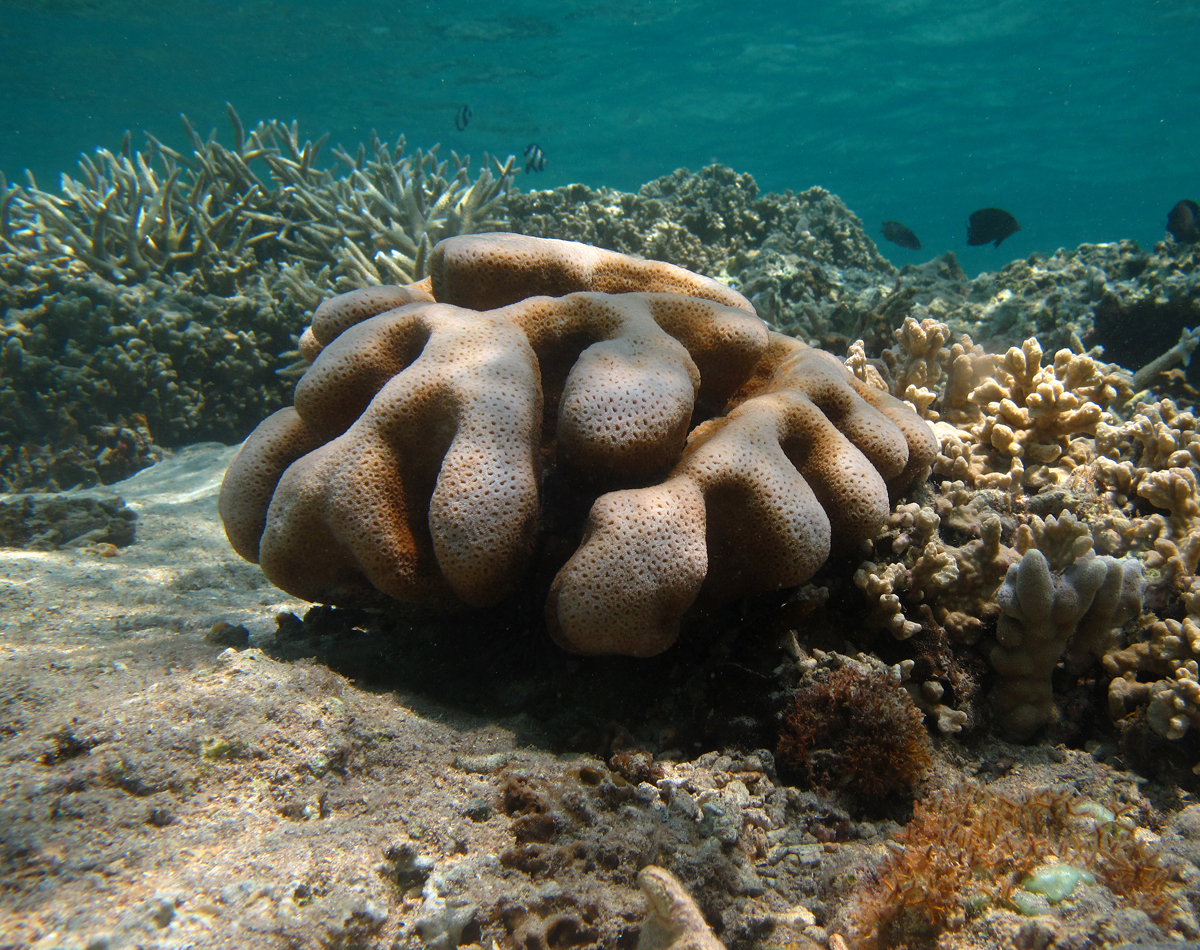
- Cyphastrea serailia off Réunion

Scientific classification
- Kingdom: Animalia
- Phylum: Cnidaria
- Subphylum: Anthozoa
- Class: Hexacorallia
- Order: Scleractinia
- Family: Merulinidae
- Genus: Cyphastrea; Milne-Edwards & Haime, 1848

Species
- See text

= Cyphastrea =

Genus of cnidarians

Cyphastrea is a genus of massive reef building stony corals in the family Merulinidae, commonly known as brain coral.

== Species ==
The World Register of Marine Species lists the following species:

- Cyphastrea agassizi (Vaughan, 1907) - Agassiz's brain coral
- Cyphastrea chalcidicum (Forsskål, 1775)
- Cyphastrea decadia Moll & Best, 1984
- Cyphastrea hexasepta Veron, Turak & DeVantier, 2000
- Cyphastrea japonica Yabe & Sugiyama, 1932
- Cyphastrea kausti Bouwmeester & Benzoni, 2015
- Cyphastrea magna Benzoni & Arrigoni, 2017
- Cyphastrea microphthalma (Lamarck, 1816)
- Cyphastrea ocellina (Dana, 1846) - ocellated brain coral
- Cyphastrea salae Baird, Hoogenboom & Huang, 2017
- Cyphastrea serailia (Forsskål, 1775)
- Cyphastrea zhongjianensis Zou, 1980
