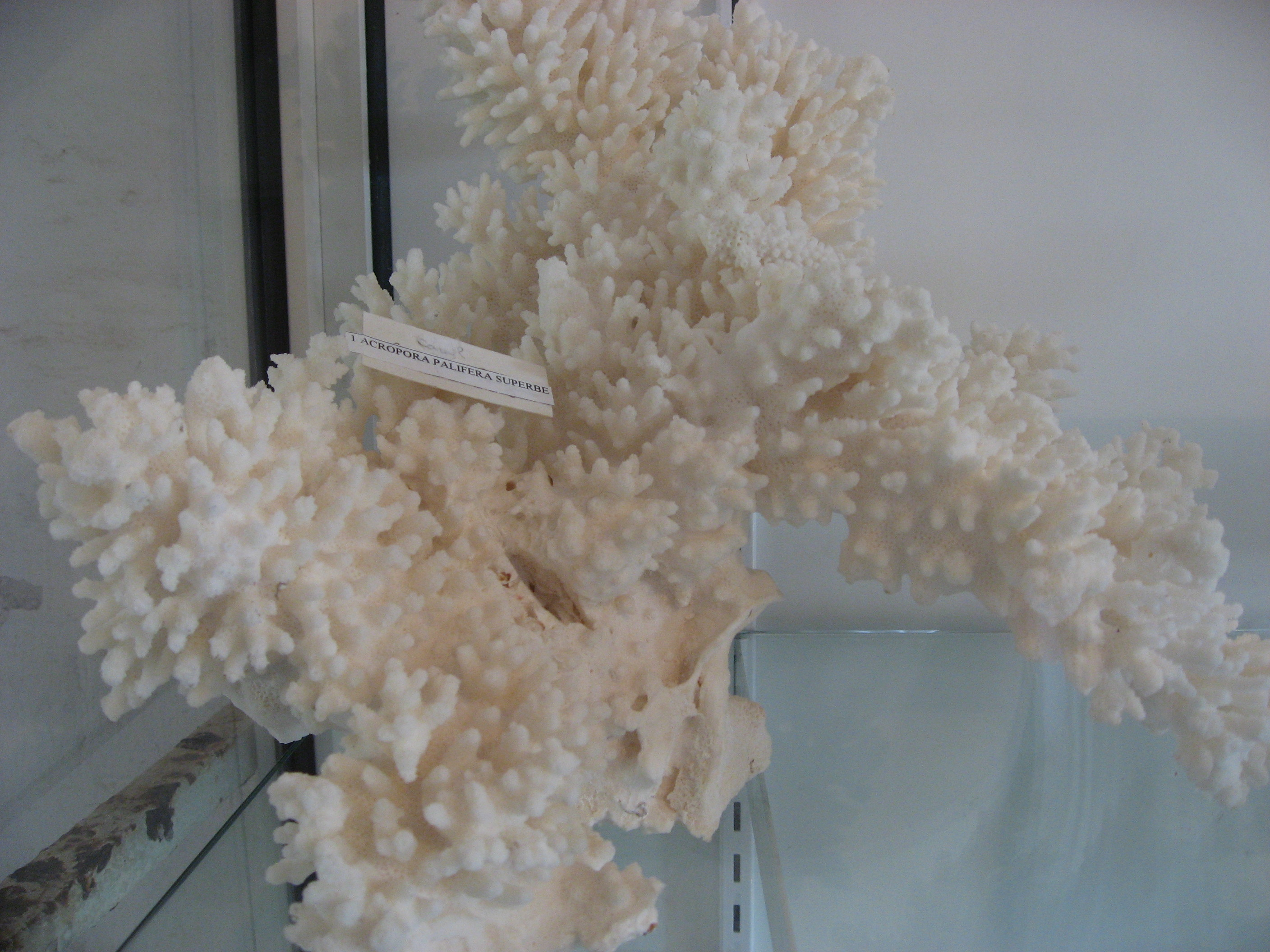
- Skeleton of Isopora palifera

Scientific classification
- Domain: Eukaryota
- Kingdom: Animalia
- Phylum: Cnidaria
- Subphylum: Anthozoa
- Class: Hexacorallia
- Order: Scleractinia
- Family: Acroporidae
- Genus: Isopora; Studer, 1878

Species
- See text

= Isopora =

Genus of corals

Isopora is a genus of small polyp stony coral in the phylum Cnidaria.

== Species ==
The World Register of Marine Species includes the following species in the genus:

- Isopora brueggemanni (Brook, 1893)
- Isopora crateriformis (Gardiner, 1898)
- Isopora cuneata (Dana, 1846)
- Isopora elizabethensis (Veron, 2000)
- †Isopora matahari Santodomingo, Wallace & Johnson, 2015
- Isopora palifera (Lamarck, 1816)
- Isopora togianensis (Wallace, 1997)
