= Kerehikapa =

Island in Solomon Islands

Coordinates: 7.453°S 158.022°E

Kerehikapa is an island in Solomon Islands; it is located in Isabel Province. It is part of the Marine Protected Area of Arnarvon Islands.

== Internet ==
On February 1, 2011, a VSAT broadband Internet system was installed at the permanent conservation office on Kerihikapa.

== Fauna ==
- Dobsonia inermis
- Macroglossus minimus
- Nyctimene major
- Pteropus woodfordi
- Pipistrellus papuanus
