= 156th meridian east =

Line of longitude

156th meridian east

The meridian 156° east of Greenwich is a line of longitude that extends from the North Pole across the Arctic Ocean, Asia, the Pacific Ocean, Australasia, the Southern Ocean, and Antarctica to the South Pole.

The 156th meridian east forms a great circle with the 24th meridian west.

== From Pole to Pole ==
Starting at the North Pole and heading south to the South Pole, the 156th meridian east passes through:

Co-ordinates	Country, territory or sea	Notes
90°0′N 156°0′E	Arctic Ocean	
77°5′N 156°0′E	East Siberian Sea	
71°5′N 156°0′E	Russia	Sakha Republic; Magadan Oblast — from 66°4′N 156°0′E
60°57′N 156°0′E	Sea of Okhotsk	Shelikhov Gulf
56°42′N 156°0′E	Russia	Kamchatka Krai — Kamchatka Peninsula
53°35′N 156°0′E	Sea of Okhotsk	
50°45′N 156°0′E	Russia	Sakhalin Oblast — island of Paramushir, Kuril Islands
50°23′N 156°0′E	Pacific Ocean	Passing just east of Bougainville Island, Papua New Guinea (at 6°42′S 155°57′E)
6°47′S 156°0′E	Solomon Islands	Ovau Island
6°49′S 156°0′E	Solomon Sea	Passing just west of Fauro Island, Solomon Islands (at 6°58′S 156°1′E); Passing just east of Shortland Island, Solomon Islands (at 7°2′S 155°51′E)
11°46′S 156°0′E	Coral Sea	Passing through the Coral Sea Islands Territory, Australia
29°58′S 156°0′E	Pacific Ocean	
60°0′S 156°0′E	Southern Ocean	
69°0′S 156°0′E	Antarctica	Australian Antarctic Territory, claimed by Australia

== See also ==
- 155th meridian east
- 157th meridian east
