= Fera Island =

Island in Solomon Islands

Coordinates: 8.1072°S 159.595°E

Fera Island is one of the chain of islands forming Buala Bay, in Isabel Province, Solomon Islands. The other islands are Juakau, Tasia, Karuo and Sulei.

Fera Airport is on Fera Island.
