= Santa Isabel (island) =

Island in Isabel Province, Solomon Islands

Coordinates: 8°01′50″S 159°10′34″E

Native name: Mahaga
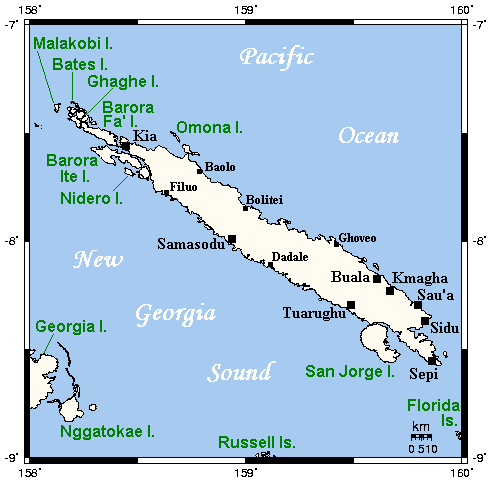
- Map of Santa Isabel, neighbouring islands, and towns and villages

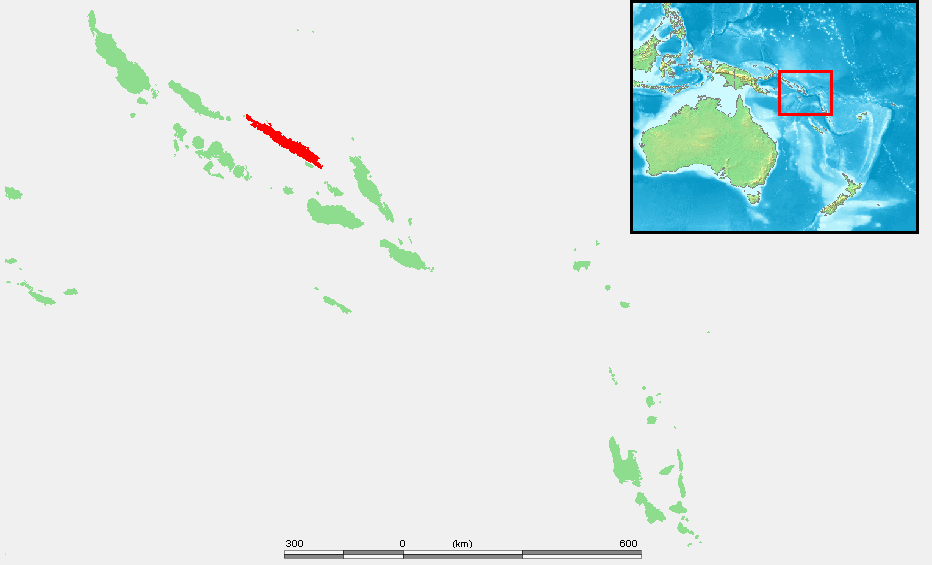

Geography
- Location: Pacific Ocean
- Archipelago: Solomon Islands archipelago
- Area: 2,999 km^{2} (1,158 sq mi)
- Highest elevation: 1,120 m (3670 ft)
- Highest point: Mount Sasari

Administration
- Solomon Islands
- Province: Isabel Province
- Largest settlement: Buala

Demographics
- Population: 35,257 (2020)
- Pop. density: 11.76/km^{2} (30.46/sq mi)

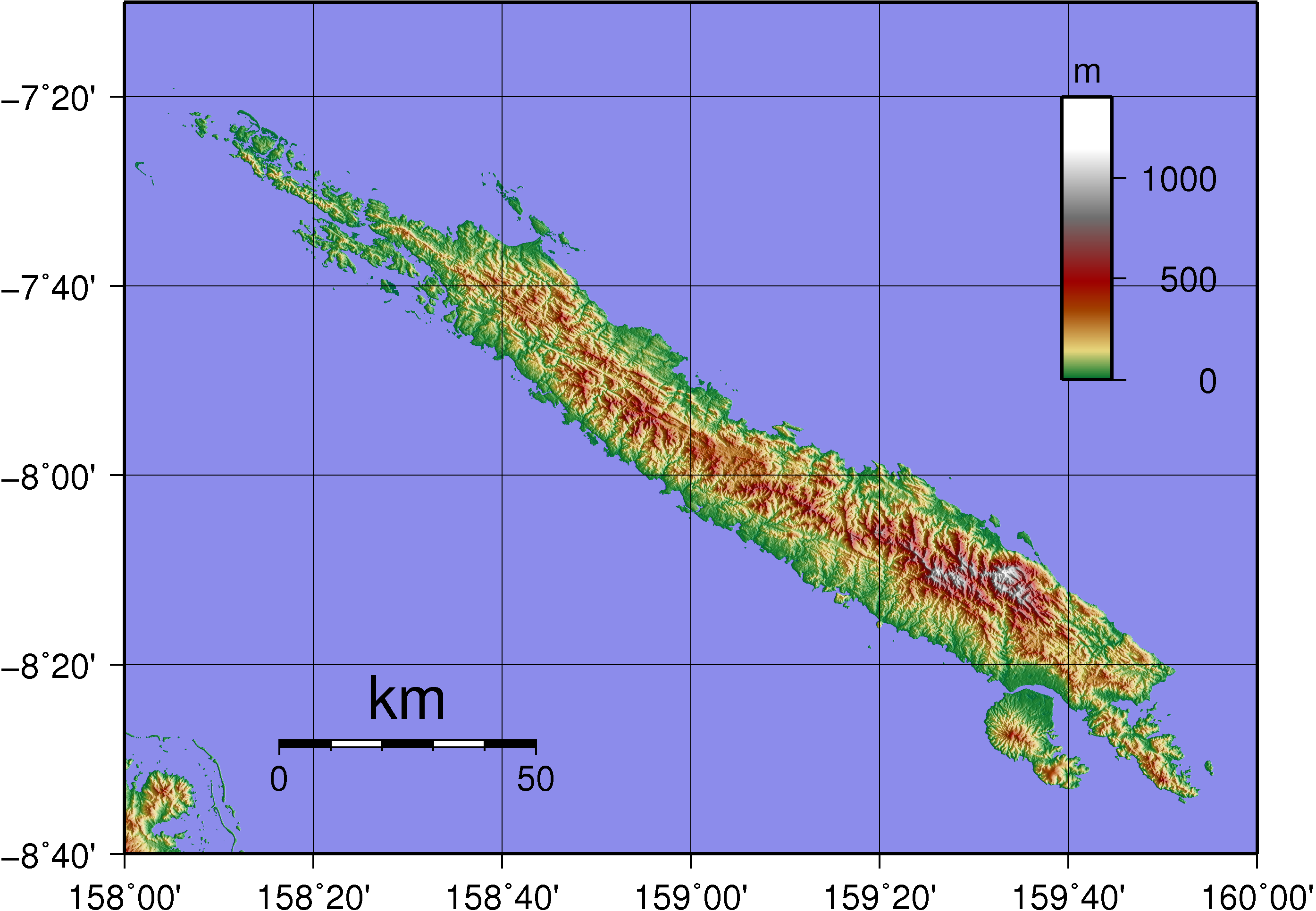
Topographical map of Santa Isabel.

Santa Isabel (also known as Isabel, Ysabel and Mahaga) is the largest island in Isabel Province, Solomon Islands. It is also the longest island, with the third largest surface area, in the country.

== Location and geographic data ==
Choiseul lies to the north-west, Malaita to the south-east. The Pacific Ocean lies to the north, and Guadalcanal (Isatabu) to the south.

The highest point in Santa Isabel is Mount Sasari, 1,220 metres (4,000 ft). The Marutho river runs down Mount Sasari to the ocean at Hofi. Almost all the rivers or streams run from that centre point except for those at the other tip of the island on the Katova side.

The administrative centre is Buala. Air transport links are provided twice weekly by Solomon Airlines, via Suavanao Airport on the peninsula adjacent to Rekata Bay on the northeast coast of Santa Isabel; and Fera Airport on neighbouring Fera Island, a few kilometres by boat from Buala.

== History ==
The first European landing in the Solomon Islands archipelago was made at Santa Isabel Island, by the Spanish explorer Álvaro de Mendaña on 7 February 1568. It was charted as Santa Isabel de la Estrella (Spanish for "St. Elizabeth of the Star"). A settlement was established by the Spaniards, and a small boat (known in the accounts as "the brigantine") was built to survey and chart the surrounding sea and islands. These local explorations led by maestre de campo Pedro Ortega Valencia and Alférez Hernando Enríquez resulted in the "discoveries" of the islands of Malaita, Guadalcanal, Savo, Vangunu, Choiseul, Makira, Ulawa, Malaupaina, Malaulalo, Ali'ite, and Ugi Island. The Spanish immediately came into contact with Solomon Islanders and at first the relationship was cordial. However, the Spanish expedition's need for fresh food and water quickly led to tension and conflict, the Solomon Islanders' subsistence economy being unable to provide continuous supplies to the Spanish.

Having found no gold and little food, and beset by attacks and sickness, the Spanish colonists shifted their colony to the site of today's Honiara on Guadalcanal, and the settlement on Santa Isabel was abandoned.

Santa Isabel islanders suffered attacks from blackbirding in the nineteenth century (the often-brutal recruitment or kidnapping of labourers for the sugar plantations in Queensland and Fiji).

In April 1885, a German Protectorate was declared over the North Solomon Islands, including Santa Isabel Island. In 1900, under the terms of Treaty of Berlin, signed on 14 November 1899, Germany transferred the North Solomon Islands (except for Bougainville and its surrounding islands) to the British Solomon Islands Protectorate in exchange for the British giving up all claims to Samoa. Missionaries settled on Santa Isabel Island under both protectorates, converting most of the population to Christianity. In the early 20th century, several British and Australian firms began large-scale coconut planting.

During World War II, the Imperial Japanese Navy established a seaplane base at Rekata Bay on the northeast coast. The base was bombed by American forces from August 1942 to August 1943. In the following month, the Japanese evacuated the base. Large bomb craters can still be seen near the former Japanese base.

Since the independence of Solomon Islands in July 1978, Santa Isabel Island has been administered as part of Isabel Province.

On 27 May 2011, seventeen men were arrested for burning down the houses in Ulubea riverside settlement, 33 houses in all, as a result of a property dispute. The number was later expanded to 31 men.

== Languages ==
The population of Santa Isabel speak as many as eight languages in addition to English and Solomon Islands Pijin.

- Blablanga language
- Bughotu language
- Cheke Holo language formerly called Marine or Maringe
- Gao language
- Kokota language
- Laghu language (extinct)
- Zabana language
- Zazao language

== Notable people ==
- Jeremiah Manele – Prime Minister since 2024, born in Santa Isabel
