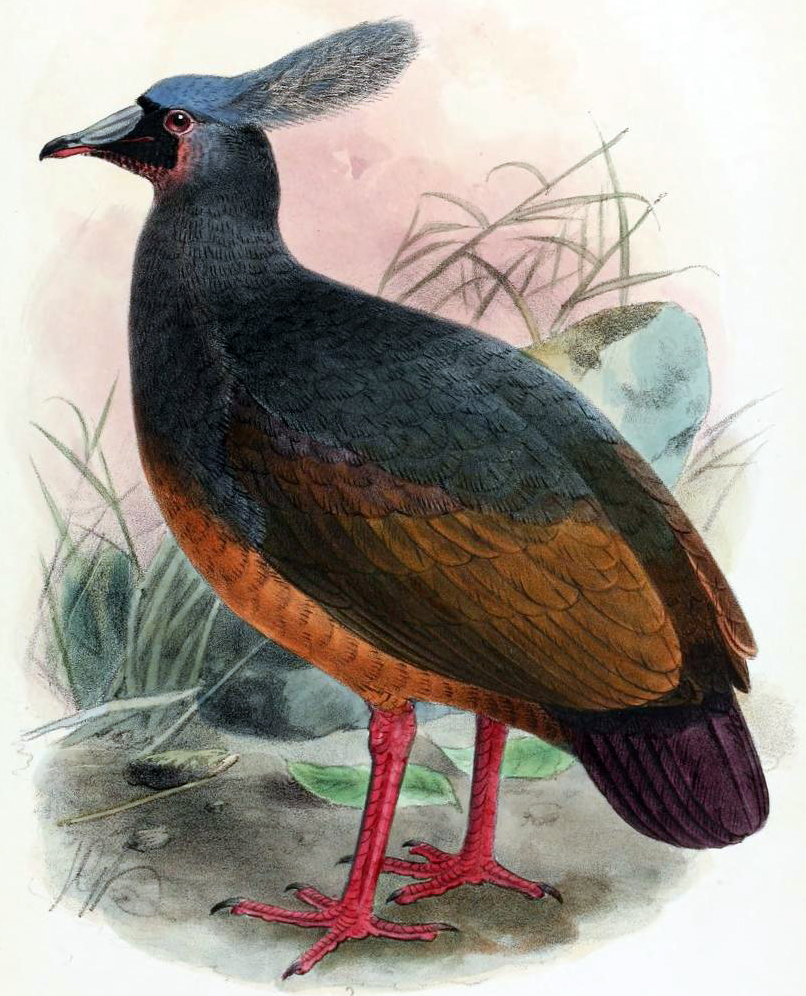
- Illustration by J. G. Keulemans, 1904

Conservation status
- Extinct (1904) (IUCN 3.1)

Scientific classification
- Kingdom: Animalia
- Phylum: Chordata
- Class: Aves
- Order: Columbiformes
- Family: Columbidae
- Genus: †Microgoura; Rothschild, 1904
- Species: †M. meeki

Binomial name
- †Microgoura meeki Rothschild, 1904
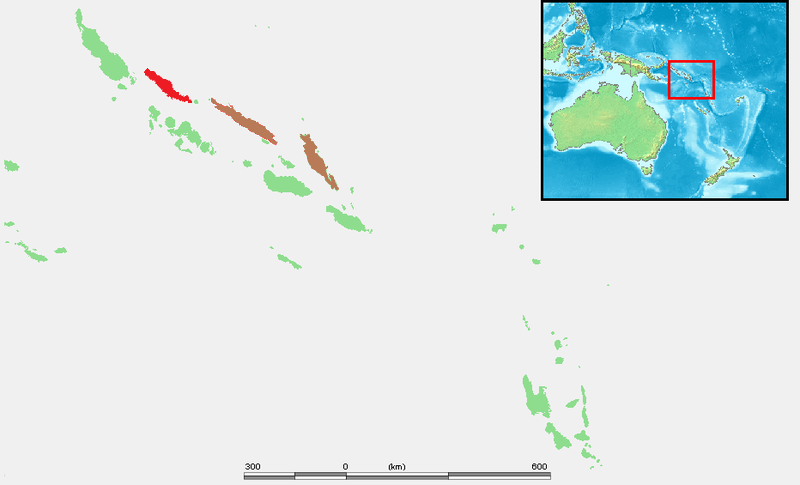
- Red denotes Choiseul, the species' confirmed range, while brown denotes Santa Isabel and Malaita, which had unconfirmed reports.

= Choiseul pigeon =

Extinct bird species from the Solomon Islands

The Choiseul pigeon (Microgoura meeki) is an extinct species of bird in the pigeon and dove family, Columbidae. It was endemic to the island of Choiseul in the Solomon Islands, although there are unsubstantiated reports that it may once have lived on several nearby islands. The last confirmed sighting was in 1904. Other common names were the Solomons crested pigeon, the Solomon Islands crowned-pigeon and the kuvojo.

The Choiseul pigeon was monotypic within the genus Microgoura. Its closest living relative is believed to be the thick-billed ground pigeon, and some authors have suggested that the Choiseul pigeon may be a link between that species and the crowned pigeons. There is no available genetic data for the Choiseul pigeon. The adult pigeon was largely blue-grey, with a buffy orange belly and a distinctive slaty-blue crest. It is unknown how this crest was held by the bird in life. The bird's head sported a blue frontal shield surrounded by black feathers and a bicoloured beak. The wings were brown and the short tail was a blackish purple. It was described as having a beautiful rising and falling whistling call.

As the bird became extinct before significant field observations could be made, not much is known about its behaviour. It is believed to have been a terrestrial species that laid a single egg in an unlined depression in the ground. It roosted in pairs or small groups of three or four in small shrubs and was reportedly very tame, allowing hunters to pick it up off its roost. The Choiseul pigeon lived in lowland forests, particularly in coastal swampy areas that lacked mangroves. It was only recorded by Albert Stewart Meek, who collected six adults and an egg from the northern part of the island in 1904. Despite many subsequent searches, the bird has not been definitively reported since. It is believed to have been rare when Meek collected his specimens. The indigenous peoples reported that the species was driven to extinction due to the introduction of cats, as the pigeon had never previously confronted a carnivorous mammal on Choiseul. The last unconfirmed report of a Choiseul pigeon was in the early 1940s, and the species is considered extinct.

== Taxonomy ==
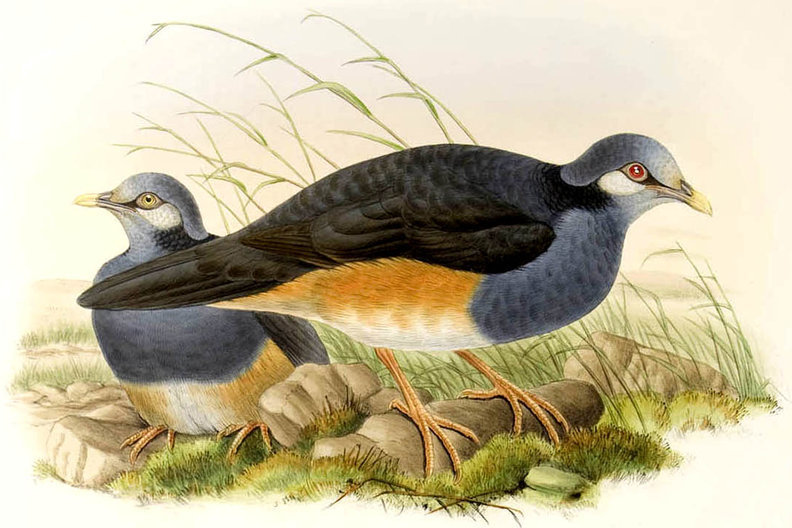
The possibly related thick-billed ground pigeon (Trugon terrestris)

The Choiseul pigeon was described by the British zoologist Walter Rothschild in 1904 on the basis of six skins—three male and three female—and an egg collected by the British naturalist Albert Stewart Meek earlier that year. It was placed in the monotypic genus Microgoura, whose name comes from the Ancient Greek word mikros "small", and goura, a New Guinean aboriginal name for the similarly crested crowned pigeons of the genus Goura. Rothschild named the species after Meek, giving the bird the specific name meeki. Though its relationships are unclear, the Choiseul pigeon is believed to have been closest to the thick-billed ground pigeon (Trugon terrestris) from Indonesia and Papua New Guinea, which has similar plumage. It has been suggested that the Choiseul pigeon was a link between the thick-billed ground pigeon and the crowned pigeons; however, other sources argue that it may not have been closely related to the crowned pigeons as its crest was quite different. Based on behavioural and morphological evidence, the British palaeontologist Jolyon C. Parish proposed that the Choiseul pigeon should be placed in the Gourinae subfamily along with the Goura pigeons, the dodo, the Rodrigues solitaire, and others in 2014. As of 2025, there is no available genetic data for the Choiseul pigeon.

Today, five skins and a partial skeleton are kept in the American Museum of Natural History, while a single skin and the egg are kept at the Natural History Museum at Tring. The Choiseul pigeon is also known as the Solomon crowned pigeon, Solomon Islands pigeon, Solomons crested pigeon, Solomon Islands crested pigeon, Choiseul crested pigeon, crested Choiseul pigeon, Meek's pigeon, Meek's ground pigeon, and dwarf goura. The indigenous peoples of Choiseul called the species either "kumku-peka" or "kukuru-ni-lua", which translates literally as "pigeon-belong-ground".

== Description ==
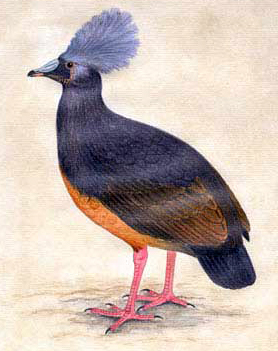
Illustration showing alternate crest arrangement

The Choiseul pigeon was about 31 cm (12 in) long. The wing of the male was 195–197 mm (7.7–7.8 in), the tail 100–105 mm (3.9–4.1 in), the culmen 34 mm (1.3 in), and the tarsus was 60 mm (2.4 in). The wing of the female was 180–190 mm (7.1–7.5 in), the tail 100 mm (3.9 in), the culmen 33 mm (1.3 in), and the tarsus was 60 mm (2.4 in). Adult Choiseul pigeons of both sexes were blue-grey overall with a buffy orange belly. The pigeon had a distinctive long, rounded crest that had a hairy texture. This crest, like the crown, was slaty-blue and emerged from the bird's hindcrown. Though many artists have speculated, it is unknown how the pigeon held its crest in life as Meek's notes did not cover this subject. John Gerrard Keulemans (who produced the illustration accompanying Rothschild's original description), depicted the crest as being flat based on Meek's specimens; other artists have presented it as spread and scraggly like that of the crowned pigeons. It has been suggested that the crests of the museum specimens were flattened during preparation.

On the bird's forehead was a naked and pale chalky-blue frontal shield. This was surrounded by short, velvety black feathers that extended from the base of the bill to the area just below and in front of the eye, while the area below the eye was a pinkish wash. The bird's chin and throat were sparsely covered with black, velvety feathers, while the neck was a slaty-blue that transitioned into a brownish-grey breast. The abdomen and undertail-coverts were a rich orange, while the undertail was a blackish-grey. The wing was slaty with a hint of brown at its base and became a warm, dark brown by the wingtips; the underwing was brown. The back was grey and transitioned into a browner rump, while the uppertail-coverts were a dark sooty-grey with blackish tips. The tail, which was short and rounded, was a very dark indigo that had a slightly purple iridescent sheen. The bill was bicoloured; the upper mandible was chalky-blue with a black tip while the lower mandible was red. The plumage of the juvenile is unknown. The bird's feet were a dull purplish-red and unfeathered up to the heel, while the iris was a dark brown.

The bird's voice was never recorded; however, after it became extinct, the indigenous peoples described it as possessing a "beautiful rising and falling whistling call given from the roost site every evening." Others described the call as a low "c-r-r-ooo", "cr-ooo", or "cr-o-o-o".

== Behaviour and ecology ==
Not much is known about the species' behaviour, as it became extinct before significant field observations could be made. It is likely that the Choiseul pigeon was a largely terrestrial species, feeding and nesting near the forest floor. The indigenous people of the town of Vundutura said that the pigeon would roost in pairs or small groups of three or four in small shrubs close to the ground. They claimed that the species was very tame, allowing local hunters to approach it and pick it up off of its perch by hand. They reported that the species had stones in its gizzard. It laid a single dark, cream-coloured egg in an unlined depression on the ground. The egg was about 43 by 31.3 mm (1.69 by 1.23 in) in size, which is considered small in proportion to the bird.

== Distribution and habitat ==
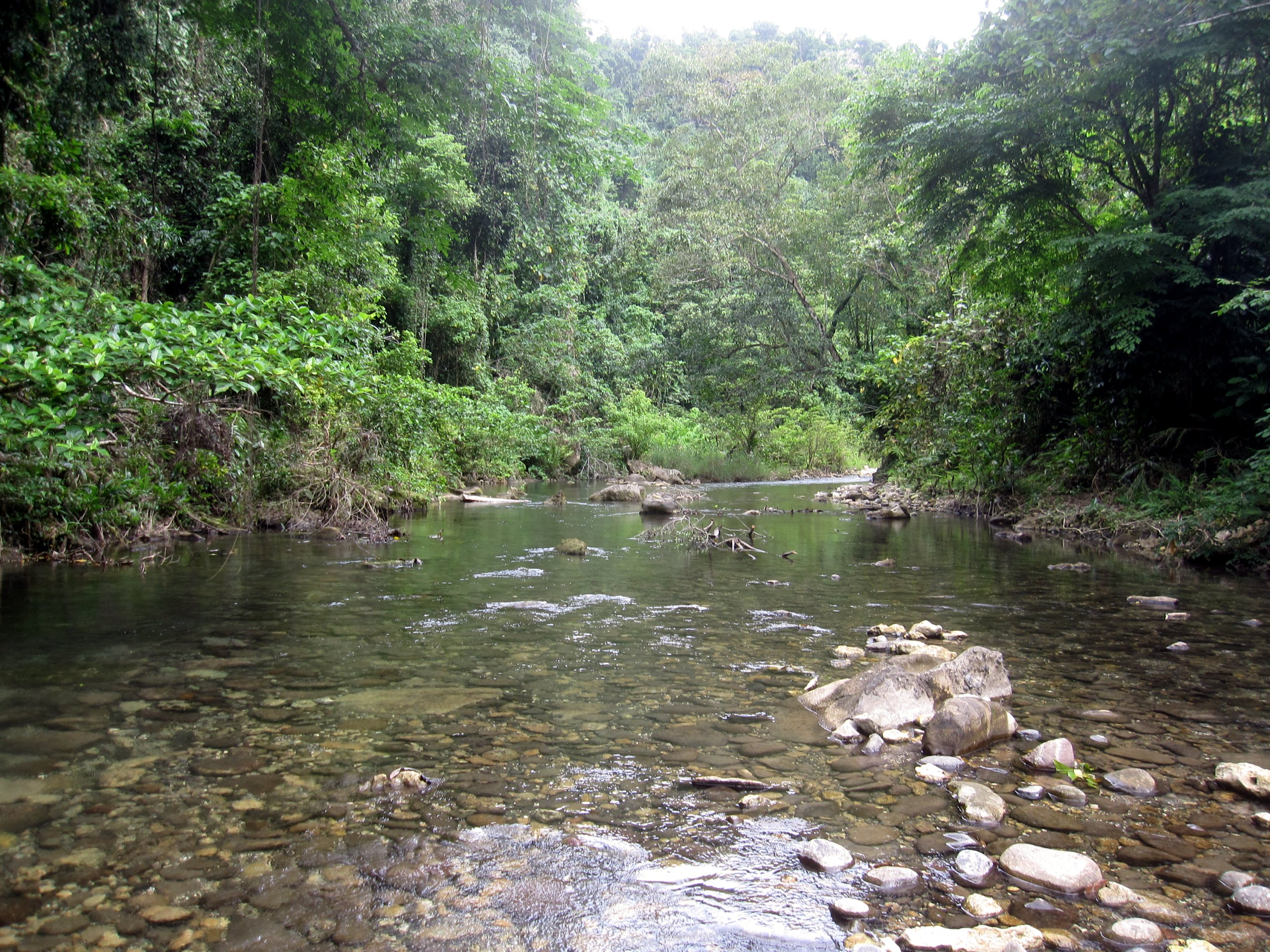
Lowland forest in the Solomon Islands

The Choiseul pigeon was non-migratory and is thought to have lived on the forest floor in lowland forests, including coastal swampy areas that lacked mangroves. The Choiseul pigeon is usually considered to have been endemic to the island of Choiseul in the Solomon Islands off the coast of New Guinea, where the only specimens were collected. The specimens Meek acquired were likely collected near Choiseul Bay in the northern part of the island. The last reports of the species from the indigenous population came from the Kolombangara River. It also reportedly lived on the neighboring islands of Santa Isabel and Malaita, and it is suspected that it may once have lived on Bougainville Island. However, these reports were never confirmed and must be considered anecdotal. It would be considered very unusual if the Choiseul pigeon were truly endemic to Choiseul as the island hosts no other endemic species, and the pigeon was never linked ecologically with another species on the island.

=== Last sightings ===
In January 1904 six specimens and an egg were collected by Albert Stewart Meek, a bird collector for Lord Walter Rothschild, near Choiseul Bay on Choiseul. Several local boys told Meek that the pigeon was also present on the nearby islands of Santa Isabel and Malaita. Though Meek did not travel to these islands, he did search for the Choiseul pigeon on the adjacent Bougainville Island, but did not find any evidence of its presence. No other specimens were ever collected or seen by Western scientists.

The Choiseul pigeon was not searched for again until briefly in 1927 and again in October 1929, when five veteran collectors belonging to the Whitney South Sea Expedition dedicated three months to searching for the pigeon in multiple locations across Choiseul without success. The indigenous people interviewed by this expedition largely believed that the pigeon was extinct in 1929. The last reported indigenous sighting was sometime in the early 1940s near Sasamungga by the Kolombangara River, although this sighting was never confirmed. Searches of the small, cat-free islands of Rob Roy Island and Wagina off Choiseul's southeast coast and Choiseul's forested coastal swampland in the 1960s by British ornithologist Shane A. Parker did not discover any signs of the pigeon. American scientist Jared Diamond searched for the bird in 1974 without success.

== Relationship with humans ==
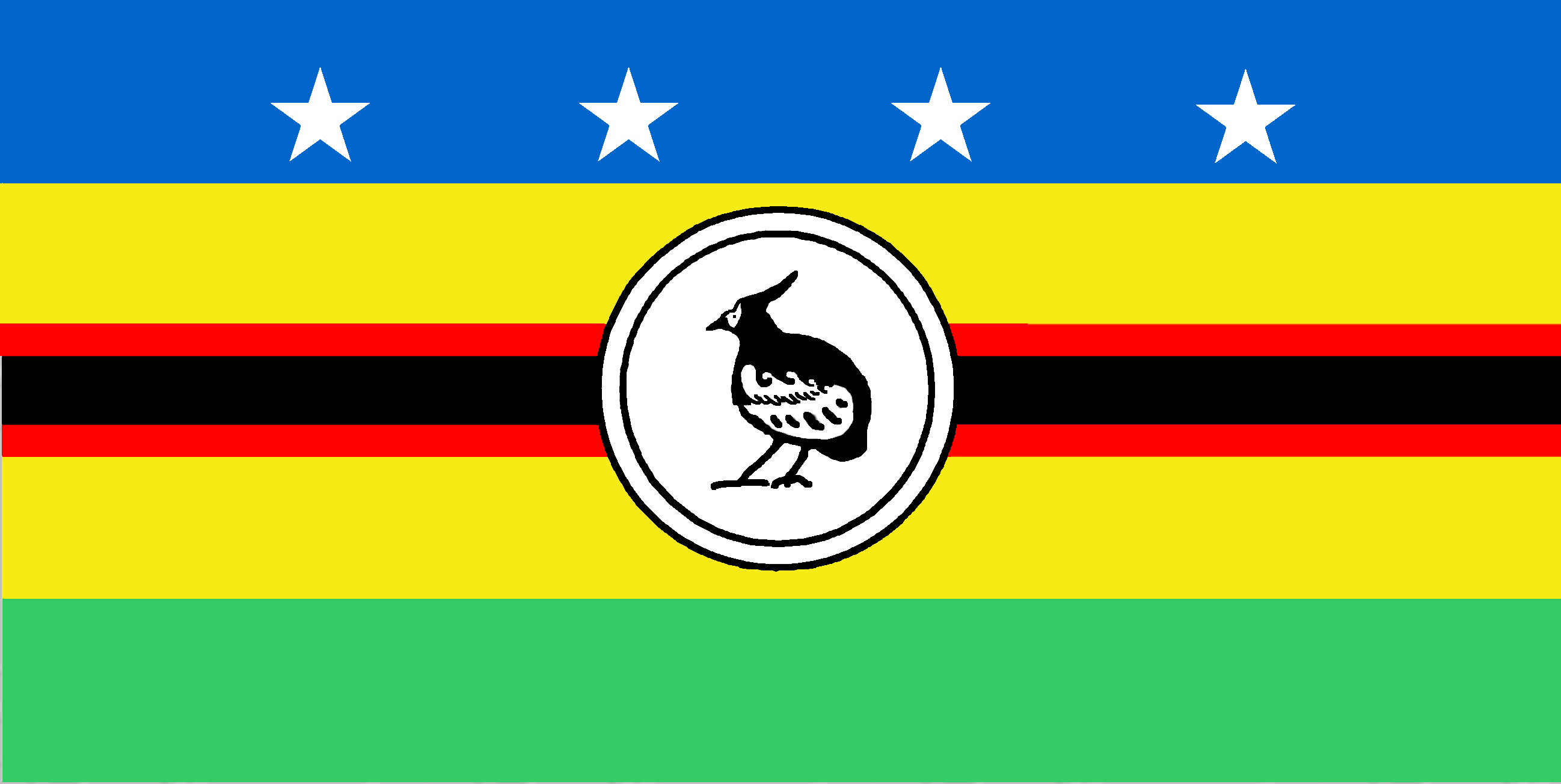
Choiseul pigeon on the flag of Choiseul Province

This pigeon was a source of food for the local people, who would locate its roosting sites either due to the bird calling or by the droppings that had accumulated below its perches. It was well-remembered by the indigenous peoples, and stories of the delicious ground-dwelling pigeon were passed down by local elders after its extinction. One indigenous person implied that the gizzard stones of the pigeon may have had value locally. After the bird's extinction, the indigenous people have occasionally confused the Choiseul pigeon with the arboreal crested cuckoo-dove in modern folklore, and several claims of the pigeon's continued existence turned out to be based on the cuckoo-dove. After its discovery, several Western bird collections highly desired its skins; the Whitney South Sea Expedition spent three months at high expense on Choiseul with the primary objective being the acquisition of the Choiseul pigeon. In 2012 the Choiseul pigeon was commemorated on a stamp from Mozambique along with several other extinct birds. The Choiseul pigeon is depicted on the flag of Choiseul Province.

=== Extinction ===
The indigenous population believed that the pigeon became extinct due to predation by feral cats and, to a lesser extent, feral dogs. As Choiseul has no indigenous carnivorous mammals, the ground-dwelling pigeon was particularly susceptible to the introduced cats. If the pigeon existed on islands that feral cats had never reached, it is believed that the clearance of its forest habitat would have led to its local extinction. As there have been no substantiated reports since 1904 despite multiple searches, the IUCN has declared it extinct. As several ornithologists had visited Choiseul and the nearby islands prior to Meek without noting any sign of the bird's existence, it is likely that the Choiseul pigeon was already close to extinction in 1904.
