= Choiseul Province =

Choiseul Province Soesol Provins (Pijin)
- Province
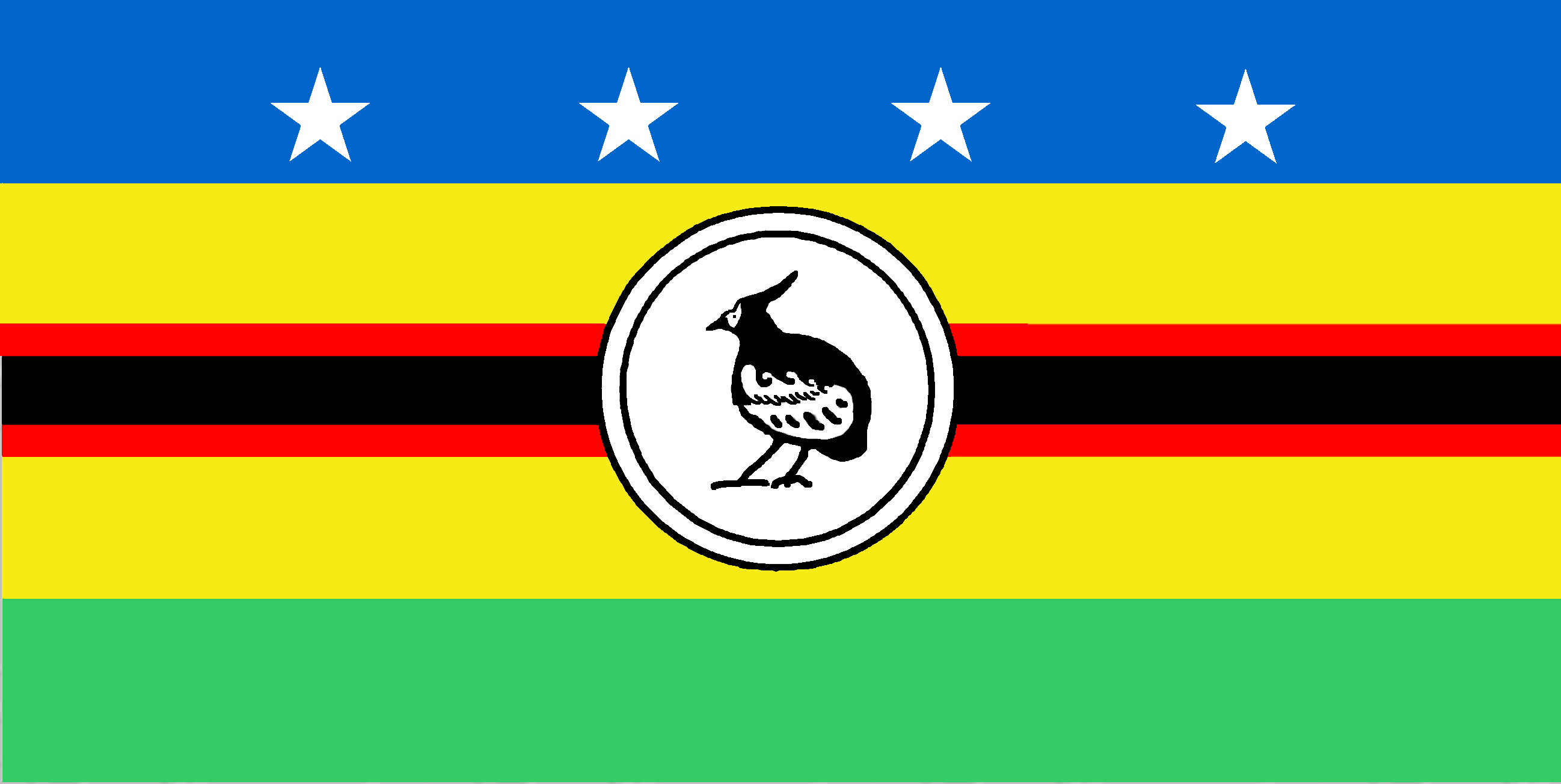
- Flag

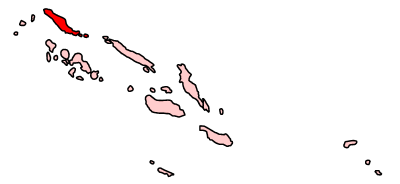
- Coordinates: 7°0′1″S 156°57′50″E
- Country: Solomon Islands
- Capital: Taro Island

Government
  - Premier: Hon. Harrison Pitakaka

Area
  - Total: 3,837 km^{2} (1,481 sq mi)

Population (2019 census)
  - Total: 30,775
  - Density: 8.021/km^{2} (20.77/sq mi)
- Time zone: UTC+11 (+11)
- ISO 3166 code: SB-CH

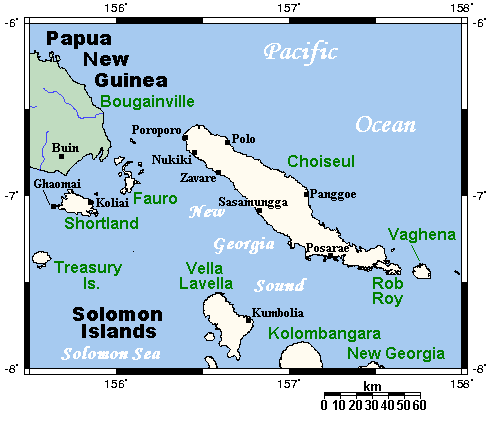
Choiseul and neighbouring islands

Choiseul Province is one of the nine provinces of Solomon Islands. It lies southeast of Bougainville (part of Papua New Guinea), west of Santa Isabel Island, and north of Vella Lavella, Kolombangara & New Georgia. It has a population of 30,775 as of 2019.

The province has three major islands: Choiseul, Wagina, and Rob Roy. Choiseul Island (commonly known as Lauru to the natives) has a land area of 3,294 square kilometres (1,272 mi^{2}), Wagina is 243 square kilometres (94 mi^{2}) and Rob Roy is 200 square kilometres (77 mi^{2}). Taro Island, the capital of the province, has an area of 1.5 square kilometres (0.58 mi^{2}).

== History ==
=== Discovery and naming ===
When the natives first arrived and discovered the big island, they called it Lauru. Then, in 1568, the Spanish explorer Álvaro de Mendaña de Neira rediscovered the island and named it San Marcos ('Saint Mark'). Mendana himself never set foot on Lauru. He called it San Marcos, because he saw the island from Santa Isabel on the Day of Saint Mark.

200 years later in 1768, the French explorer Louis Antoine de Bougainville saw the island again and named it Choiseul after the Minister of foreign affairs and statesman Choiseul.

Today, the two most common names for the island are Choiseul and Lauru. San Marcos is not commonly used in the present day.

=== Colonial era ===
Choiseul Province was initially not part of the British Solomon Islands Protectorate (BSIP). Like Buka, Bougainville (both now part of Papua New Guinea's North Solomons Province), Santa Isabel, and the Ontong Islands, it was part of the German Solomon Islands in 1884. Fifteen years later, in 1899, Germany ceded Choiseul, Isabel and Ontong Java to the British to become part of the British Solomon Islands. In 1900, Charles Morris Woodford, the Resident Commissioner for the Solomon Islands sailed to Choiseul via Isabel on a ship Torch and planted the British flag on Choiseul on 23 August 1900. Proclaiming Choiseul as part of the British Solomon.

During World War II, North West Choiseul, along the Nukiki to Voza corridor was partly occupied by Japanese military forces whose garrison was raided by US marine forces in October and November 1943. The protectorate (BSIP) set up the Choiseul Council in 1948. The council consisted of representatives of the seven sub districts in Choiseul. It met twice a year with the District Commissioner to discuss its business.

=== Modern era ===
Eagon Resource Company Limited was the first logging company to operate in Choiseul when it arrived in Moli in 1989.

The Choiseul Township Project Office was established in 2008. Starting in 2009, a short term Land Consultant has facilitated the process of acquiring perpetual estate in Parcel 015–002–4, which was purchased under the Sales and Purchase Agreement. On 21 December 2011, in the village of Poroporo, the Minister of Provincial Government and Institutional Strengthening, Hon. Walter Folotalu presided over the signing ceremony of the procurement of perpetual estate to the Provincial Government. On that day, the Minister handed over a cheque of SI$4 million as part payment of the purchase price of SI$10,040,000 for a piece of land. The payment was made to the landowners in the mainland.

On 25 June 2010, the MV. San Marcos, the second ship of Lauru Shipping is commissioned in Taro. San Marcos is a cargo boat of 35 metre, 340 tonne, 250 cubic metres loading capacity and can travel at 10 knots. The vessel was bought from Japan for SI$3.7 million (US$458,800.84), with the national government funding SI$1 million (US$124,000.23), Taiwan SI$1 million (US$12,400.02), Lauru Shipping Company SB$1.6 million (US$198,400.36) and South Choiseul Constituency SB$100,000 (US$12,400.02).

The first diesel generator house for Taro was built in 2011. It was brought to provide lights for the first Premiers' Conference to be held in Choiseul later that year. A new Provincial Assembly Hall was built and completed in 2011 with support from the PGSP funding to accommodate the Premiers' Conference in Taro. Choiseul Bay Airport was upgraded in 2011, with its first terminal being built. It was also fenced in. The terminal building was funded by PGSP. A new concrete wharf was built in Taro in 2011 to replace the old wooden wharf.

A new computer lab was built for Choiseul Bay Provincial Secondary School, the only Provincial Secondary School, in 2012.

In April 2013, the first EFTPOS machine was installed by Westpac Bank in the capital Taro as an in store service. Launching the service was Hon. Elijah Doro Muala, the then parliament member for South Choiseul. However, it was not sustainable, and is no longer available.

During the October 2013 Choiseul provincial election, 4 women candidates competed in the election. This is the first time women competed in an election at the provincial level since Choiseul became a province. None won a seat in the 14 seat Provincial Assembly.

In the 2014 financial year, the Province's annual budget was SI$15,004,189, of which SI$5,729,704 was recurrent expenditure and SI$9,274,485 was capital expenditure.

In 2025, Premier Harrison Pitakaka called for Choiseul Province to join Bougainville after its proposed 2027 independence. The two areas were once united in the Republic of the North Solomons, and share deep cultural and historical ties.

== Government ==
=== Legislative Authority ===
On 25 February 1992, a separate Choiseul province was created by separation from the Western Province.

It has had the following Premiers:

- 1992–1996: Hon. Clement Kengava
- 1996–1999: Hon. Simmy Vazarabatu
- 1999–2018: Hon. Jackson Kiloe
- 2018–2021: Hon. Watson Qoloni
- 2021–2023: Hon. Benjiman Harrison
- 2023–2024: Hon. Tongoua Tabe
- 2024–Present: Hon. Harrison Ngosu Pitakaka

=== Members to the National Parliament ===
There are three National Constituencies in Choiseul. However, Choiseul originally only had 2 constituencies (North & South), as allocated since colonial British rule. The Northwest Choiseul Constituency was created later on after intensifying political & traditional considerations, and lobbying.

Northeast Choiseul:

- Late Dr. Gideon Zoleveke (Legislative Council - BSIP)
- Late Hon. Allan Qurusu
- Hon. Manasseh Sogavare (1997–present)

Northwest Choiseul:

- 1992–1997: Hon. Alpha Kimata
- 1997–2009: Hon. Clement Kengava
- 2009–2019: Hon. Connelly Sandakabatu
- 2019–Present: Hon. Harry Kuma

South Choiseul:

- Hon. Jason Dorovolomo (Legislative Council - BSIP)
- Hon. Rev. Caleb Kotali
- Hon. Rev. Leslie Boseto
- Hon. Elijah Doro Muala (2009–2019)
- Hon. Robertson Qalokale (2020)
- vacant

Mostly, these MPs don't work together well due to the strong pressure from kin-based politics.

=== Administrative divisions ===
Choiseul Province is sub-divided into the following constituencies (or electoral districts), which are further sub-divided into wards (with populations at the 2009 and 2019 Censuses respectively):

Name		Population (2009 census)			Population (2019 census)		
Name		Total	Male	Female	Total	Male	Female
01. – South Choiseul		8,435	4,307	4,128	9,698	4,980	4,718
01.01.	Wagina	1,636	852	784	1,782	952	830
01.02.	Katupika	1,988	1,018	970	2,318	1,203	1,115
01.03.	Vasipuki	1,574	886	768	1,952	1,004	948
01.04.	Viviru	1,499	771	728	1,615	837	778
01.05.	Babatana	1,738	860	878	2,031	984	1,047
02. – North West Choiseul		8,435	4,307	4,128	9,698	4,980	4,718
02.06.	Tepazaka	1,680	893	787	2,274	1,198	1,076
02.07.	Batava	4,931	2,578	2,353	5,677	2,920	2,757
02.08.	Tavula	2,487	1,240	1,247	2,751	1,383	1,368
02.09.	Polo	1,699	860	839	2,003	999	1,004
02.10.	Bangera	1,158	576	582	1,603	831	772
03. – East Choiseul		5,982	3,078	2,904	6,769	3,552	3,217
03.11.	Susuka	1,746	908	838	1,939	1,022	917
03.12.	Senga	1,856	948	908	2,117	1,106	1,011
03.13.	Kerepangara	1,140	553	587	1,248	629	619
03.14.	Kiruega	1,240	669	571	1,465	795	670
Total		26,372	13,532	12,840	30,775	15,863	14,912

== Infrastructure ==
=== Health ===
The Choiseul Provincial Health Service (CPHS) has 26 health facilities around the province. The main referral provincial hospital is the Taro Hospital. The hospital is based on the Taro Island which is also the island capital of the province. It is the first certified Baby Friendly Hospital in the Solomon Islands in October 2010. And awarded the shield by UNICEF and WHO. The award means that Taro Hospital advocates for exclusive breastfeeding for babies up to six months before introduction of soft diet. The hospital also does not encourage artificial and bottle feeding of babies. It also has links to community groups that support, protect and promote the practice of exclusive breast feeding of babies within Taro Hospital catchment area.

The Choiseul Provincial Health Service is also very active in health promotion and education targeting the rural population. It pays emphasis on preventative activities down to the rural areas with the help of community groups, churches and donor partners.

Taro Hospital offers the following primary health programs, reproductive health on ante natal and post natal care, childhealth on immunization, nutrition and breastfeeding practices, non communicable disease, mental health services and malaria program.

=== Telecommunication ===
Solomon Telekom Company Limited is the sole provider of both landline and mobile phone communication in the province. Telekom's office is in Taro. Landline phone communication can only be found only on Taro Island. However, Telekom also covers the island with mobile phone towers. Currently, its mobile phone towers are in Pangoe Village, Kagaloga, Sasamuqa and Wagina. In June 2014, Our Telekom added two new mobile towers, one on Ropa Island, in South Choiseul and the second at Ogho village, North West Choiseul.

Two way VHF radio can also be found in the villages, churches, schools and clinics.

== Culture ==
=== Religion ===
The first missionaries that came to Choiseul were the Methodists. The first attempt by the Methodist Ministers led by Rev John Goldie was made in 1904, but, was unsuccessful. In 1905, a second attempt was made by Rev Stephen Rabone Rooney, this time on the South of Choiseul at Sasamuqa, which was successful, leading to the first mission established in Sasamuqa village in 1905. The missionaries were instrumental in the introduction of education and health to the population. The three denominations involved in Missionary work in Choiseul were the Methodists, Catholics and the Seventh Day Adventists."

Deaconess Iula Qilanoba, the first Methodist deaconess from the Solomon Islands, was a native of Choiseul Province.

=== People ===
The people consists of several Melanesian tribes including the Gilbertese who live on Wagina. In the 19th century head hunting and blackbirding were widespread in the Solomon Islands. This led to the extinction of the people on Wagina in the 1870s. Even in the 20th century the Choiseul islanders were ill-reputed as brutal cannibals so that visitors only came with armed forces to that island. In 1916, there were brutal feuds between the several tribes which were ended by the peace treaty of Sasamungga on 8 August 1921. This event, called Kulabule, is a holiday on Choiseul.

=== Music ===
Traditionally, people in Choiseul use bamboos for traditional flutes. Now, this traditional music is only performed in custom ceremonies. One of the string bands from Choiseul is the Sirovanga Boys. Their best known song being "seni memory." Another group from Choiseul in the early 2000s was the band Savoto. Their hit songs include "inaka mach" and "Ke siro."

=== Football ===
The inhabitants of Choiseul are soccer enthusiasts. They have a team called Lauru Kuvojo, which in 2005 took part at the Solomon-Cup, the national football championship of the Solomon Islands. They have finished their participation already in the preliminary round. In November 2012, the bi-annual Kuvojo Cup was held with a team representing the provincial capital Taro winning against a team from Senga ward. Most of the 14 wards throughout Choiseul sent representative teams to participate at the Kuvojo Cup tournament in both soccer and netball.

== Geography and environment ==
=== Flora and fauna ===
The flora and fauna are both characteristic of Australia and New Guinea. The biggest mammal is the endangered dugong, a seacow which occurs in the waters near Rob Roy and Taro Island. The largest reptile is the saltwater crocodile (Crocodylus porosus) known from Australia. Known birds are the Sanford's fish eagle (Haliaeetus sanfordi), the Pacific black duck (Anas superciliosa), and the eastern reef egret (Egretta sacra). Until the beginning of the 20th century, it was the only habitat of the now extinct Choiseul crested pigeon (Microgoura meeki). Choiseul is also an important breeding place for the loggerhead sea turtle (Caretta caretta). The flora is represented by mangroves and coconuts.

=== Environmental issues ===
Commercial logging continues to operate in Choiseul throughout the entire province. A nickel mine is being planned in Katupika at the Choiseul mine and will see over 2,000 hectares (7.7 mi^{2}) cleared to gain access to nickel deposits over the life of the mining operation, although no mining license has been issued as of 2020. Prospecting for gold has also occurred close to Susuka in north Choiseul. A proposal to establish over 4,000 hectares (15 mi^{2}) in north Choiseul as oil palm plantation will also have significant environmental impact.

=== Islands ===
- Bembalama
- Choiseul
- Cyprian Bridge
- Kaghau
- Laena
- Nanagho
- Nuatambu
- Rob Roy
- Saerema
- Taro
- Moli Island
- Zinoa Islands
- Supizae Island
- Parama Island
- Butuburu Island
- Kundakaniboko Island
- Wagina
