= Cyprian Bridge Island =

Island in Choiseul Province, Solomon Islands

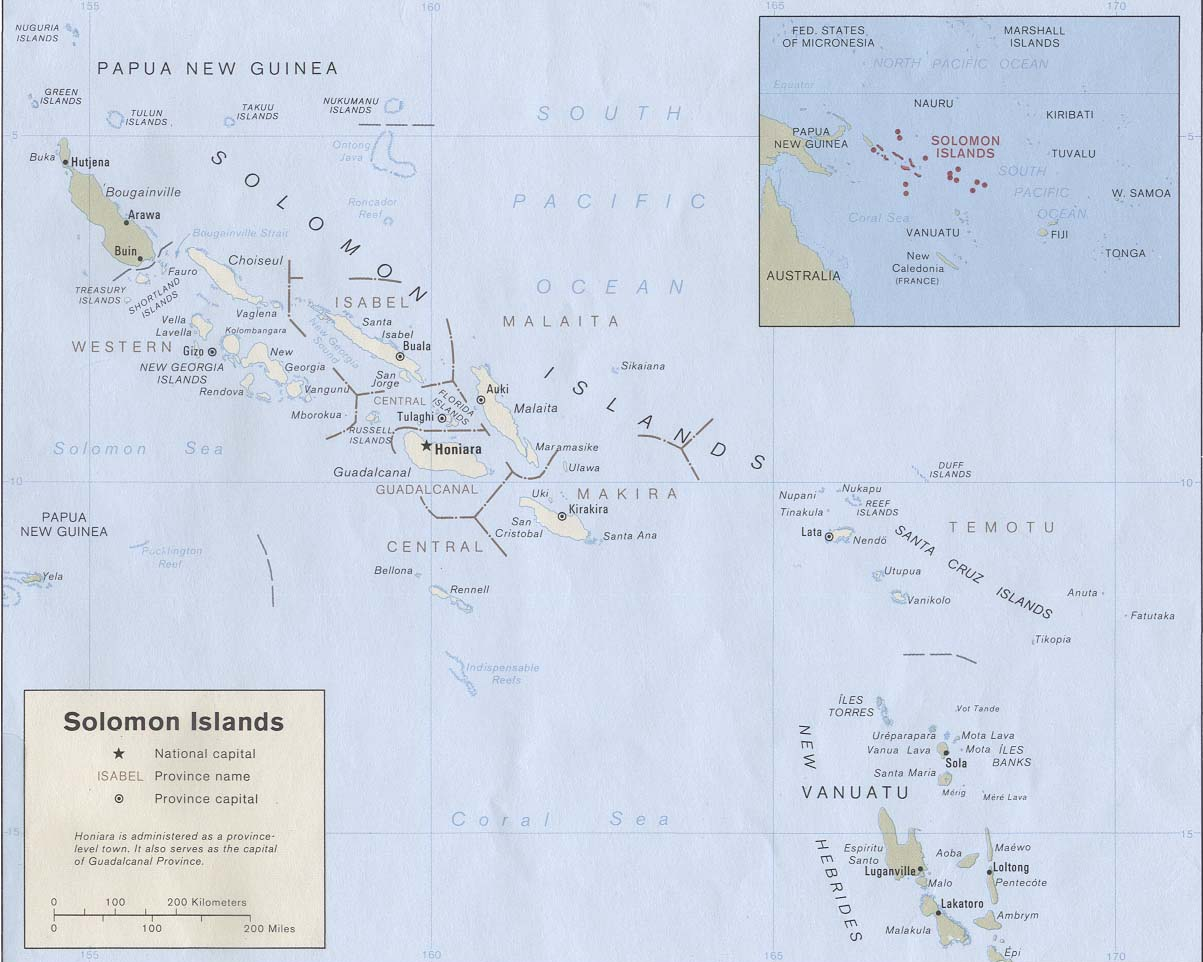
Islands and provinces of Solomon Islands in 1989 (click to enlarge).

Cyprian Bridge Island is a small, uninhabited, volcanic island in Choiseul Province, Solomon Islands. It lies at latitude 6.85°S and longitude 156.18333°E, between the islands of Fauro (about 11 km to the southwest) and Choiseul (a much larger island about 30 km to the east-northeast).

== Naming ==
The island is named after then Major Cyprian Bridge (1807-1885) a British army officer, particularly famed for his activities in the Flagstaff War against the Māori in New Zealand in 1845. He was the uncle of Admiral Sir Cyprian Bridge (1839-1924) who was the head of British Naval Intelligence.

== See also ==
- List of islands of Solomon Islands
- Uninhabited island
