= Choiseul mine =

Nickel mine in the Solomon Islands

- Location within Solomon Islands
- Location: Choiseul Province, Solomon Islands; 6°59′24.04″S 157°4′19.06″E (estimated)
- Products: Nickel

The Choiseul mine is a large mine that is in development in Katupika ward on Choiseul Island in the north of Solomon Islands in Choiseul Province. Choiseul represents one of the largest nickel reserve in Solomon Islands having estimated reserves of 63.5 million tonnes of ore grading 0.7% nickel. The 62.5 million tonnes of ore contains 440,000 tonnes of nickel metal.

The development of the mine is opposed by a Solomon Islands conservation group, as mining run off could affect seaweed farms and it could threaten the nearby Arnarvon Islands, around which is the Arnarvon Marine Conservation Area, which is a nesting ground for endangered hawksbill sea turtles.
