= Rob Roy Island =

Island in Solomon Islands

Coordinates: 7°25′S 157°35′E

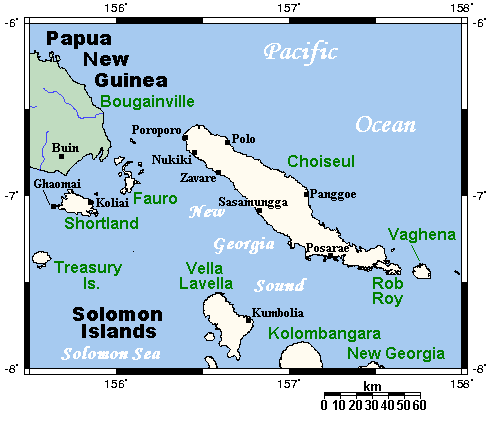
Location of Rob Roy Island (Bottom Right) and neighbouring islands

Rob Roy Island, native name Velaviru, is an island in Solomon Islands located off the South East coast of Choiseul Island; it is located in Choiseul Province.

== Geography ==
The island is covered with coconut plantation and jungle. The island is 20 km long and has a summit elevation of 150 m.

Nagosele Passage divides Rob Roy Island from Choiseul Island
