= Iula Qilanoba =

Iula, sometimes Ula, Qilanoba (1928–1998) served as the first deaconess of the United Methodist Church for the Solomon Islands.

Born in the village of Poropora in north Choiseul Island, Qilanoba completed her primary education at the Girls' Boarding School in Sasamungga, arriving there in 1948 after having it interrupted by World War II. She became a leader among her fellow students at the school, and took positions in the maternity ward, medical clinic, and nursery, allowing her to develop skills as a nurse and midwife and leading her to accompany medical field trips around the island. She also taught for several years at the same school. By the end of her education she had reached Standard 7, the only girl at the school to do so.

When the Methodist Church decided to form an order of deaconesses in the Solomon Islands in 1963, Qilanoba was the first applicant. After training for a year she completed her probation at Kokeqolo and was sent first to Roviana and then to Simbo, later joining the Mono Circuit and working for a year under the Order of St. Stephen. She returned to Choiseul when a minister for Mono became available. She was then sent to Lale on Ranonga before being sent back to her home island once again, this time as catechist, with the authority to administer the sacraments, given by the church, and to conduct marriages, given by the government. More active than her male counterparts, she would often paddle long distances to isolated areas; unusually for a Choiseul woman she was a competent canoeist, and many men deferred to her authority. Upon her retirement Qilanoba returned to the village of her birth. She remained active as a community volunteer until her death, having suffered from poor health in the last years of her life.
