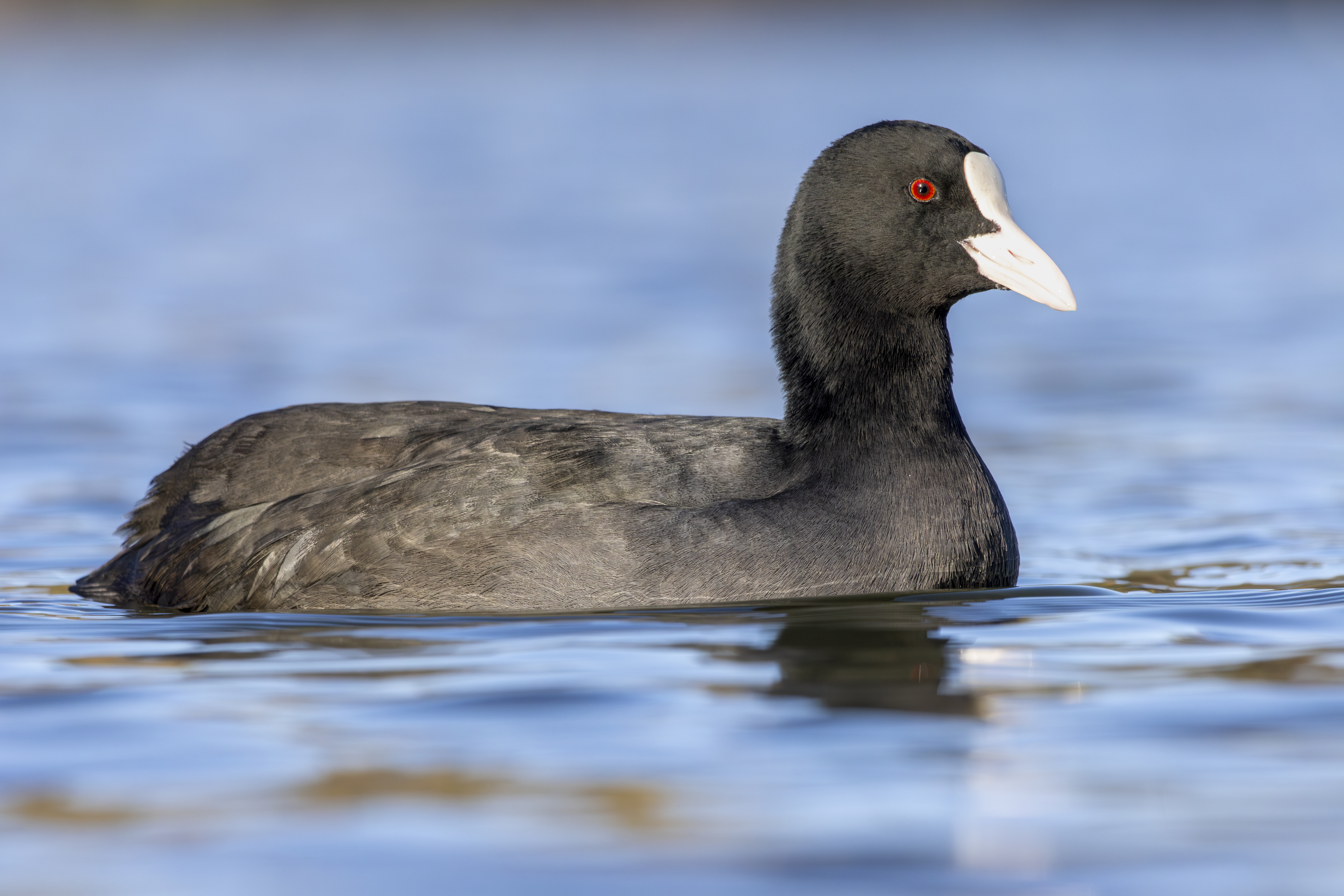
- In Paris, France

Conservation status
- Least Concern (IUCN 3.1)

Scientific classification
- Kingdom: Animalia
- Phylum: Chordata
- Class: Aves
- Order: Gruiformes
- Family: Rallidae
- Genus: Fulica
- Species: F. atra

Binomial name
- Fulica atra Linnaeus, 1758
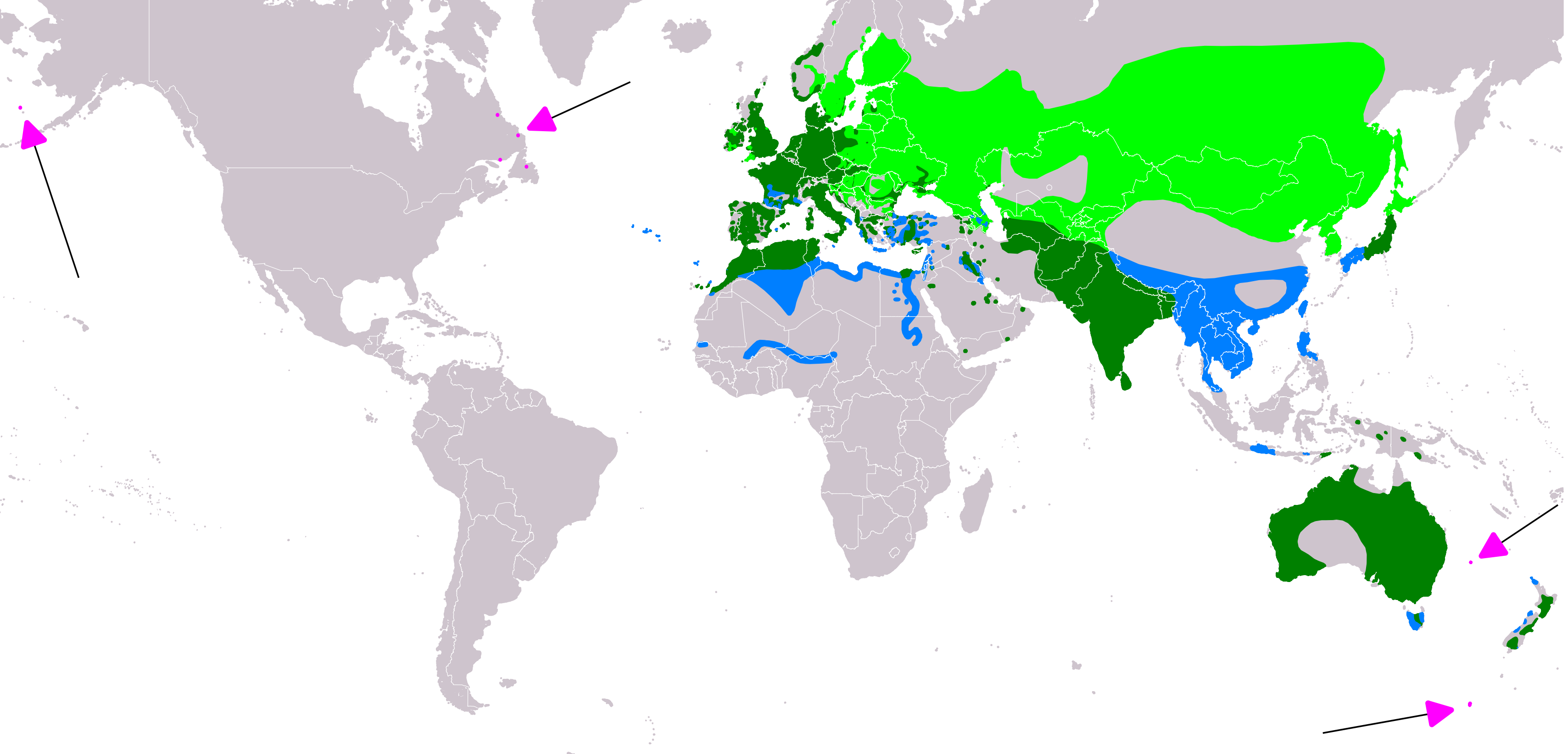
- Range Breeding Resident Non-breeding Vagrant (seasonality uncertain)

Synonyms
- Fulica aterrima Linnaeus, 1766; Fulica prior De Vis, 1888

Audio
- Call recorded in Sydney, Australia

= Eurasian coot =

Species of bird

The Eurasian coot (Fulica atra), also known as the common coot or Australian coot, is a member of the rail and crake bird family, the Rallidae. It is found in Europe, Asia, Australia, New Zealand and parts of North Africa. It has a slaty-black body, a glossy black head and a white bill with a white frontal shield. The sexes are similar in appearance.

== Taxonomy ==
The Eurasian coot was formally described by the Swedish naturalist Carl Linnaeus in 1758 in the tenth edition of his Systema Naturae under its current binomial name Fulica atra. Linnaeus specified the locality as Europe but this is now restricted to Sweden. The binomial name is from Latin: Fulica means 'coot', and atra means 'black'.

Four subspecies are recognised:

- F. a. atra Linnaeus, 1758 – Europe and north Africa to Japan, India, southeast Asia, Philippines and Borneo
- F. a. lugubris Müller, S, 1847 – Java, Bali, northwest New Guinea
- F. a. novaeguineae Rand, 1940 – central New Guinea
- F. a. australis Gould, 1845 – Australia and New Zealand

An extinct subspecies F. atra pontica has been described from the Chalcolithic (around 4800–4400 BP) from the Bulgarian Black Sea Coast.

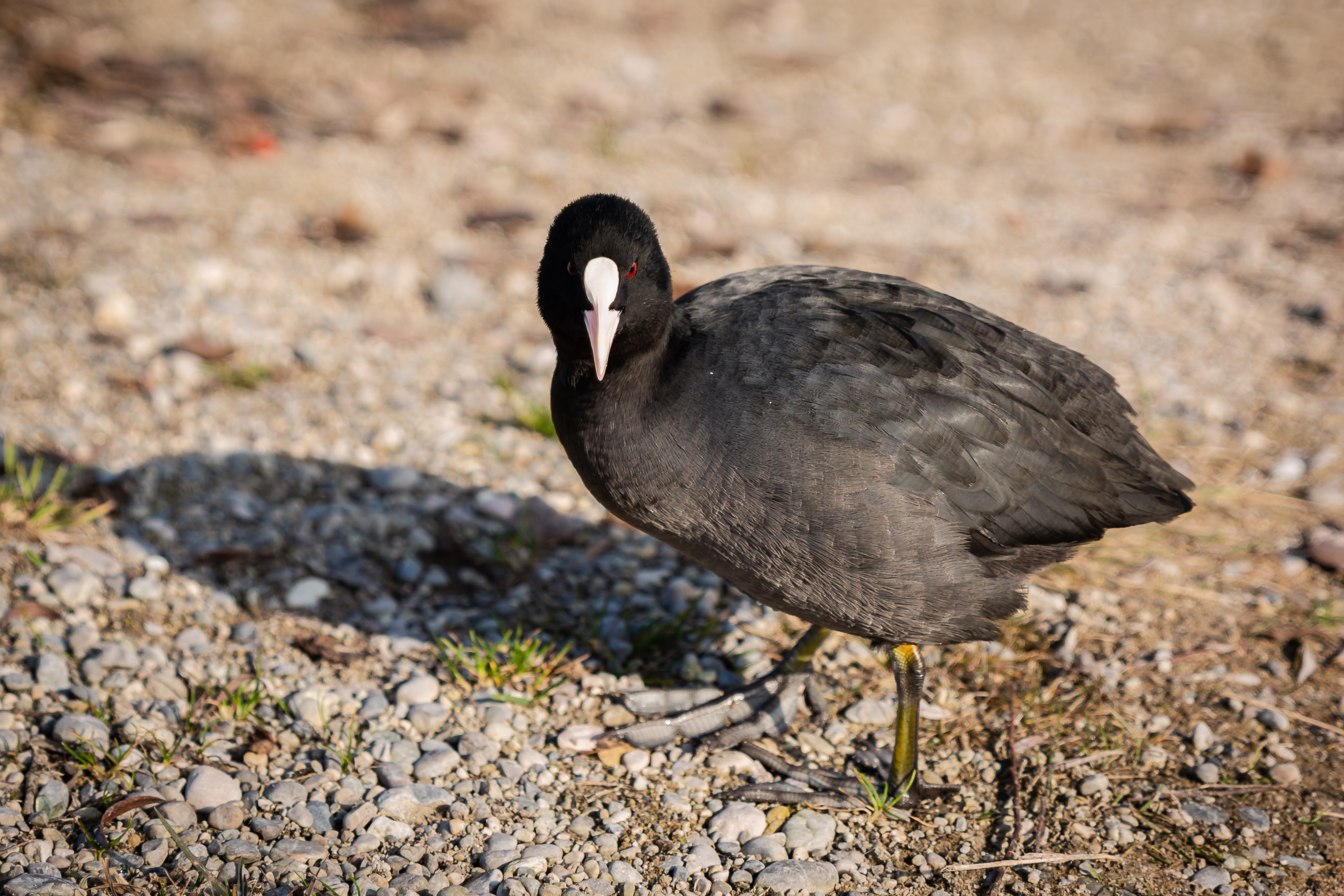
The shield

== Description ==
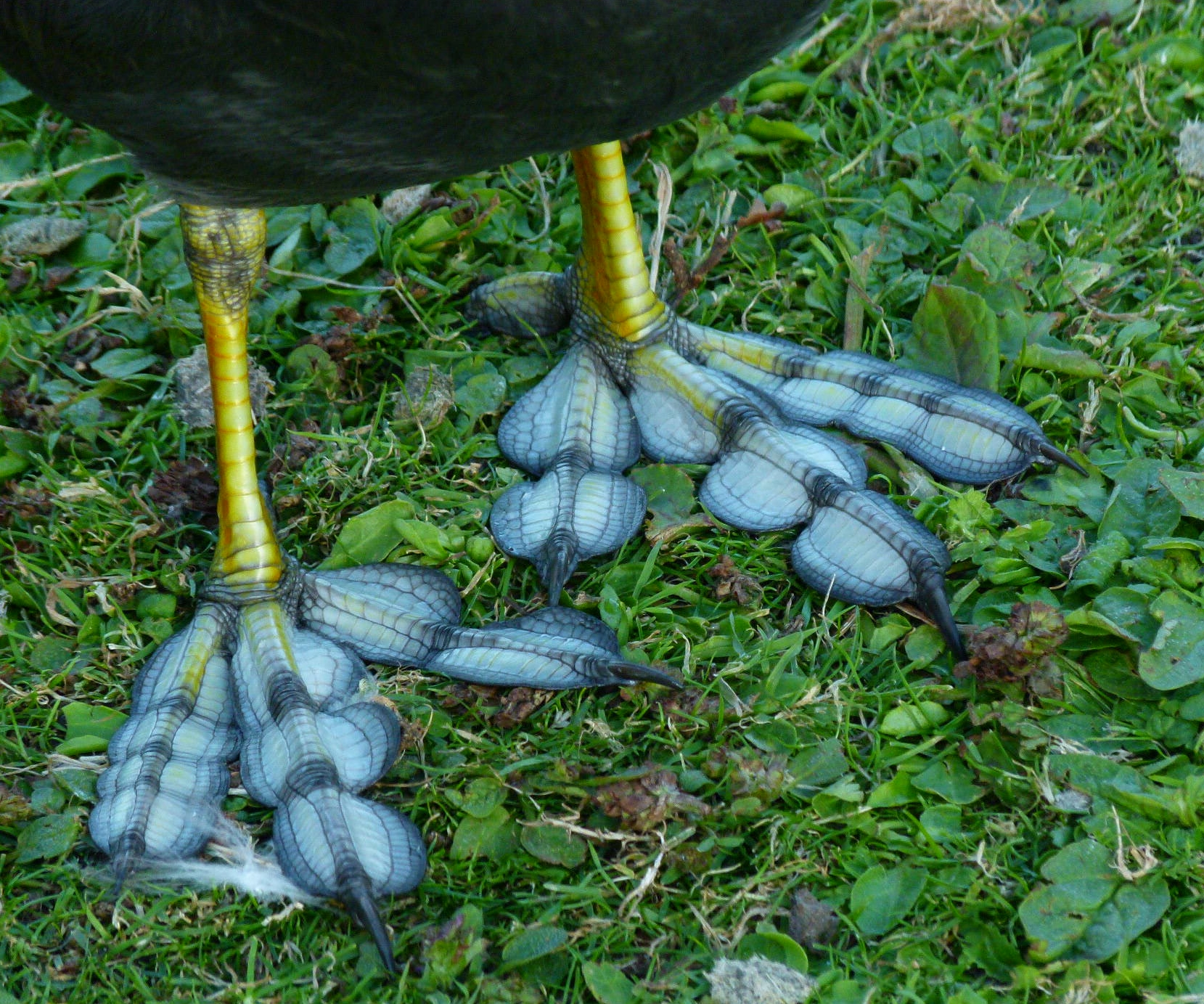
Legs and feet of Eurasian coot in St James's Park, London

The Eurasian coot is 36–38 cm (14–15 in) in length with a wing-span of 70–80 cm (28–31 in); males weigh around 890 g (31 oz) and females 750 g (26 oz). It is largely black except for the white bill and frontal shield (which gives rise to the phrase "as bald as a coot", in use as early as 1430). As a swimming species, the coot has partial webbing on its long, strong toes. The sexes are similar in appearance.

The juvenile is paler than the adult, has a whitish breast, and lacks the facial shield; the adult black plumage develops when about 3–4 months old, but the white shield is only fully developed at about one year old.

The Eurasian coot is a noisy bird with a wide repertoire of crackling, explosive, or trumpeting calls, often given at night.

== Distribution and habitat ==
The coot breeds across much of the Old World on freshwater lakes and ponds, and like its relative the common moorhen, has adapted well to living in urban environments, often being found in parks and gardens with access to water. It occurs and breeds in Europe, Asia, Australia, and Africa. The species has recently expanded its range into New Zealand. It is resident in the milder parts of its range, but migrates further south and west from much of Asia in winter as the waters freeze. It is known to occur as a vagrant in North America.

== Behaviour and ecology ==
Adults foraging in Japan

The Eurasian coot is much less secretive than most of the rail family, and can be seen swimming on open water or walking across waterside grasslands. It is an aggressive species, and strongly territorial during the breeding season, and both parents are involved in territorial defence. During the non-breeding season they may form large flocks, possibly related to predator avoidance.

It is reluctant to fly and when taking off runs across the water surface with much splashing. It does the same, but without actually flying, when travelling a short distance at speed in territorial disputes or on land to escape from intruders. As with many rails, its weak flight does not inspire confidence, but on migration, usually at night, it can cover surprisingly large distances. It bobs its head as it swims, and makes short dives from a little jump.

When fighting other waterbirds (especially other coots), the coot attacks by charging its opponent and striking them with its long legs.

=== Breeding ===
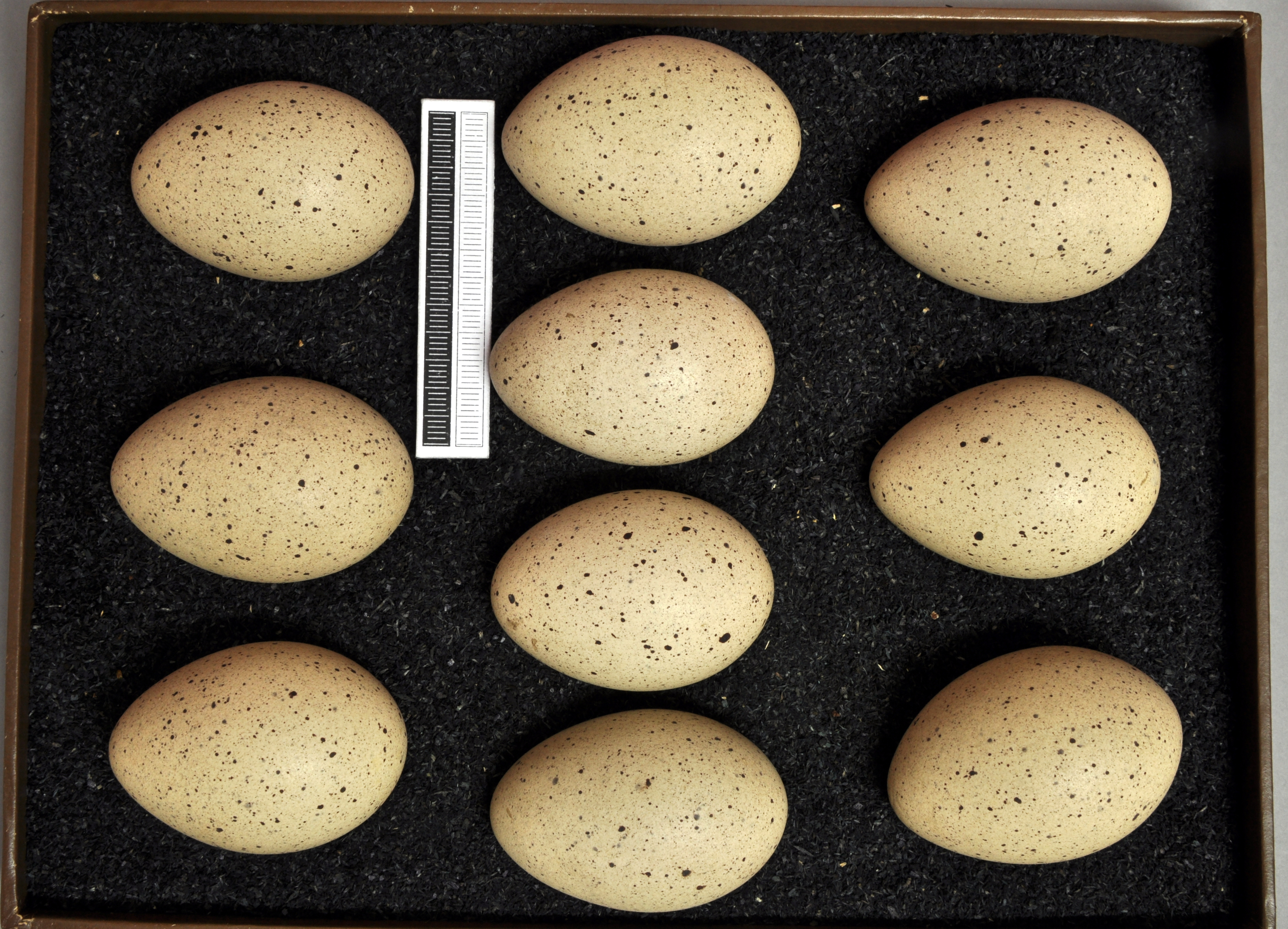
Eggs, Collection Museum Wiesbaden, Germany

The nest is a bulky structure that either floats on the water or is built in shallow water on a low or barely submerged stump or log, making a neat, large bowl. It is constructed of plant stems and leaves with a lining of finer material. Normally concealed in vegetation the nest can sometimes be placed in the open. It is built by both sexes with the male collecting most of the material which is incorporated by the female. The eggs are laid at daily intervals. The clutch usually contains between six and ten smooth and slightly glossy buff coloured eggs that are covered with black or dark brown speckles. On average they are 53 mm × 36 mm (2.1 in × 1.4 in) and weigh 38 g (1.3 oz). The eggs are incubated by both sexes beginning after the second egg is laid and hatch asynchronously after 21 to 24 days. The chicks are precocial and nidifugous. The chicks are covered with a black down. On the body the down has yellow hair-like tips. On the sides of the head, nape and throat the hair-like tips are longer and orange-red. Between the eyes and on the lores, the tips are red. The shield is bright red and the bill is red with a white tip. The young are brooded by the female for the first three to four days during which time food is brought by the male. The male also builds one or more platforms that is used for roosting and brooding the chicks. On leaving the nest, the brood is sometimes split up with each parent taking care of a separate group. The young can feed themselves when they are around 30 days and fledge at 55 to 60 days. Eurasian coots normally only have a single brood each year but in some areas such as Britain they will sometimes attempt a second brood. They first breed when they are one to two years old.

Chick mortality occurs mainly due to starvation rather than predation. Most chicks died in the first 10 days after hatching, when they are most dependent on adults for food. Coots can be brutal to their own young under pressure such as the lack of food. They will bite young that are begging for food and repeatedly do this until it stops begging. If the begging continues, they may bite so hard that the chick is killed. Coots will also lay their eggs in the nests of other coots when their environment or physical condition limits their ability to breed, or to lengthen their reproductive life.

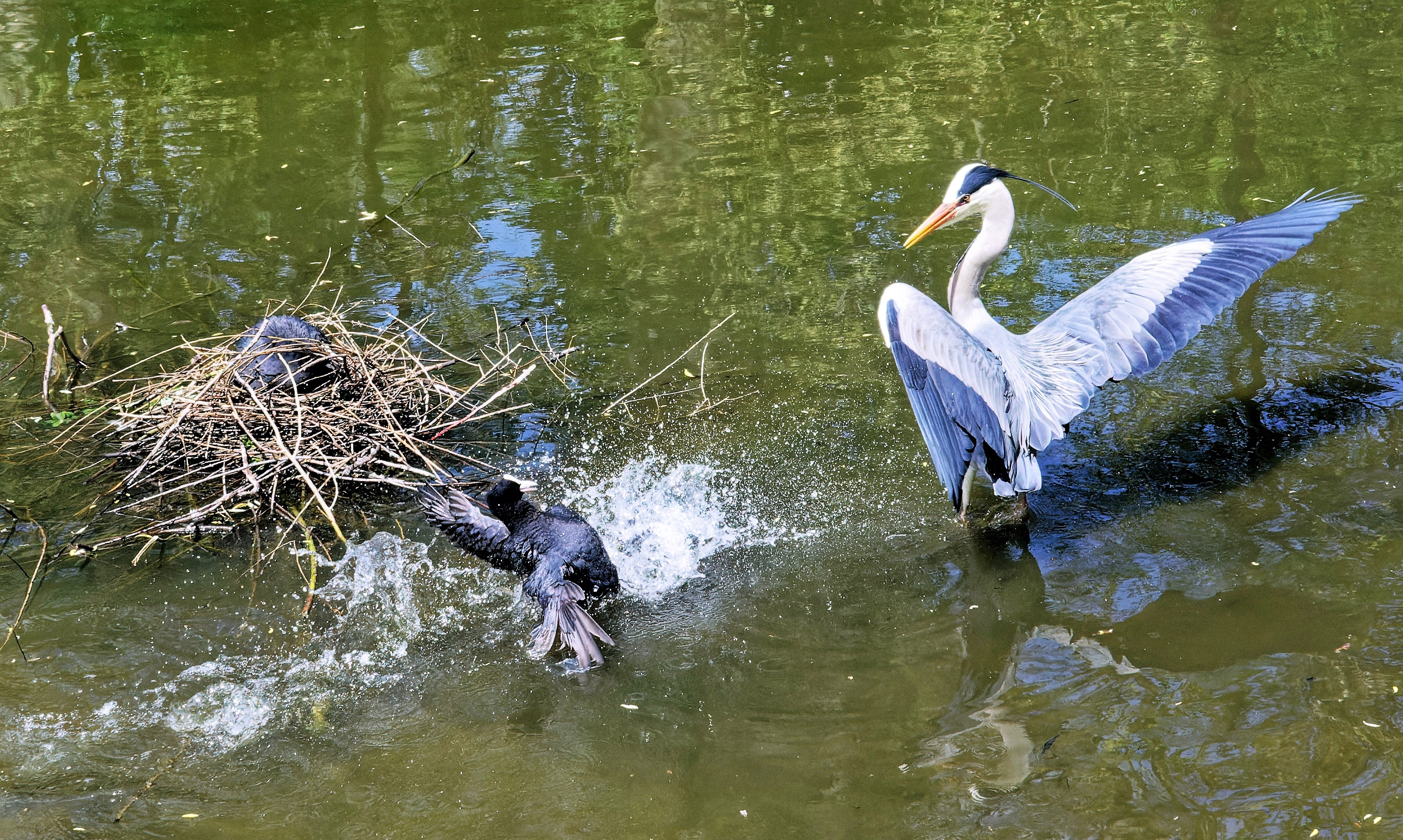
Adult defending its mate and nest from a grey heron (Ardea cinerea)

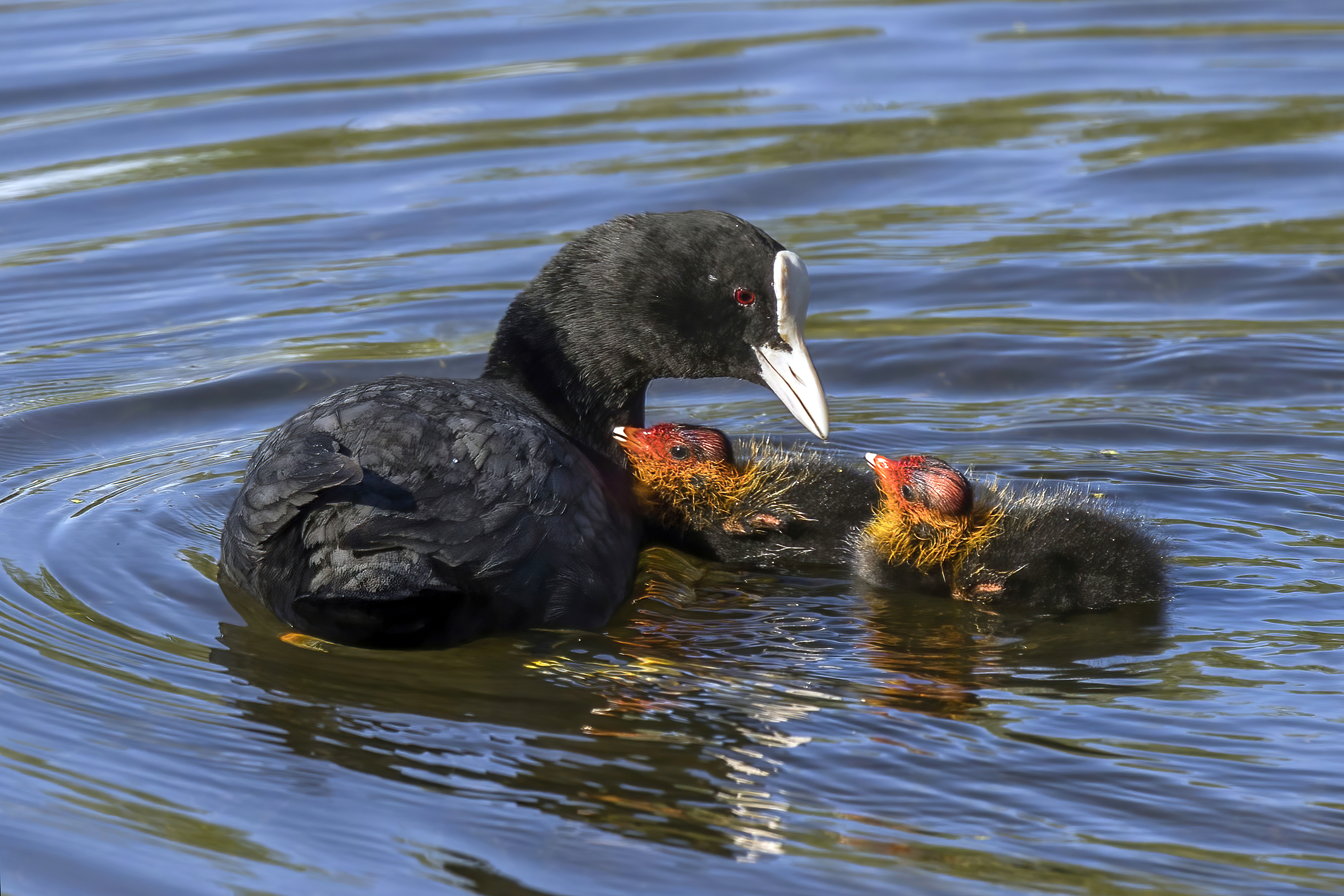
Adult with chicks, Trujillo, Spain

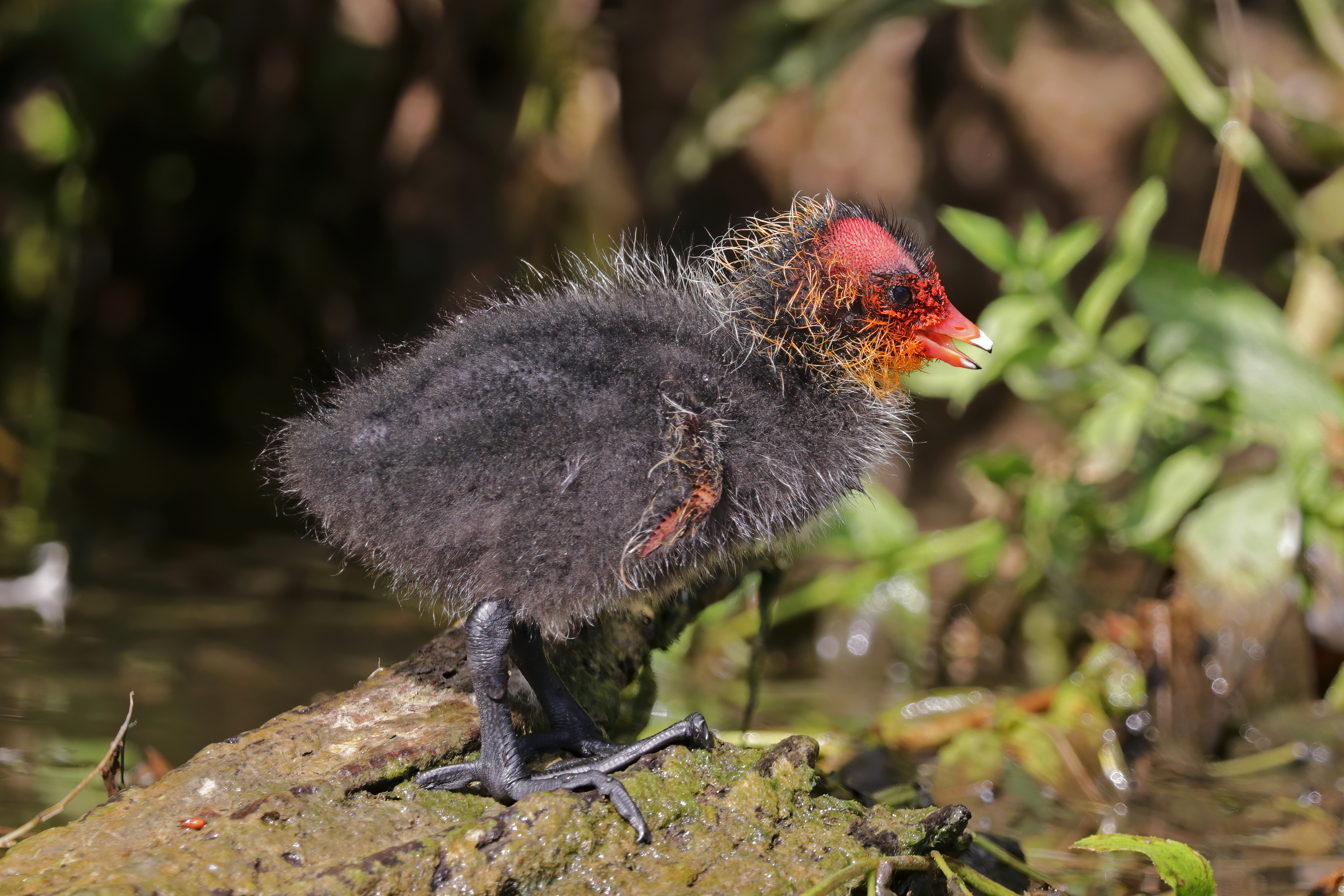
Chick in Marais Audomarois, France

Chick picking through wet leaves in Sweden

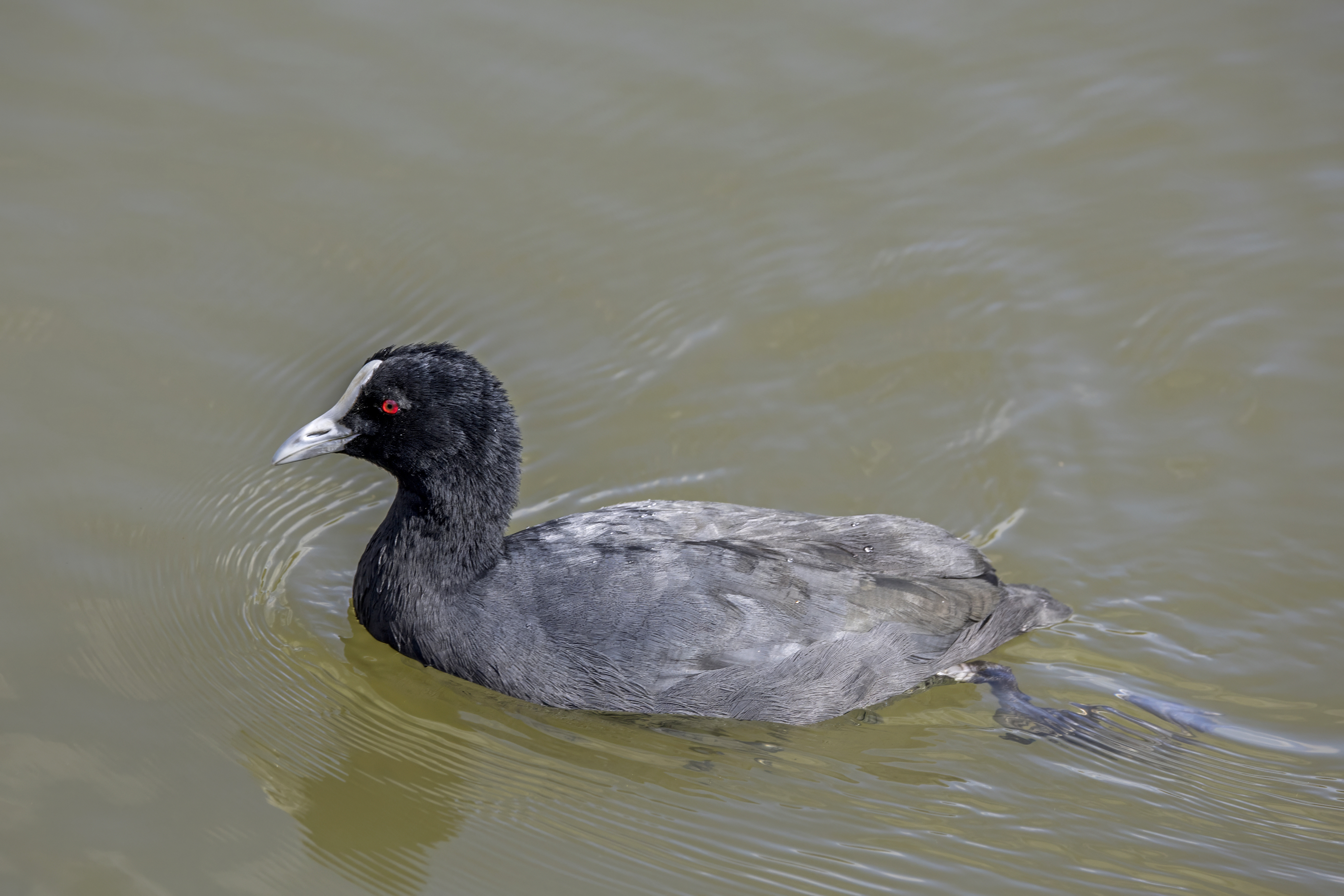
Adult F. a. australis

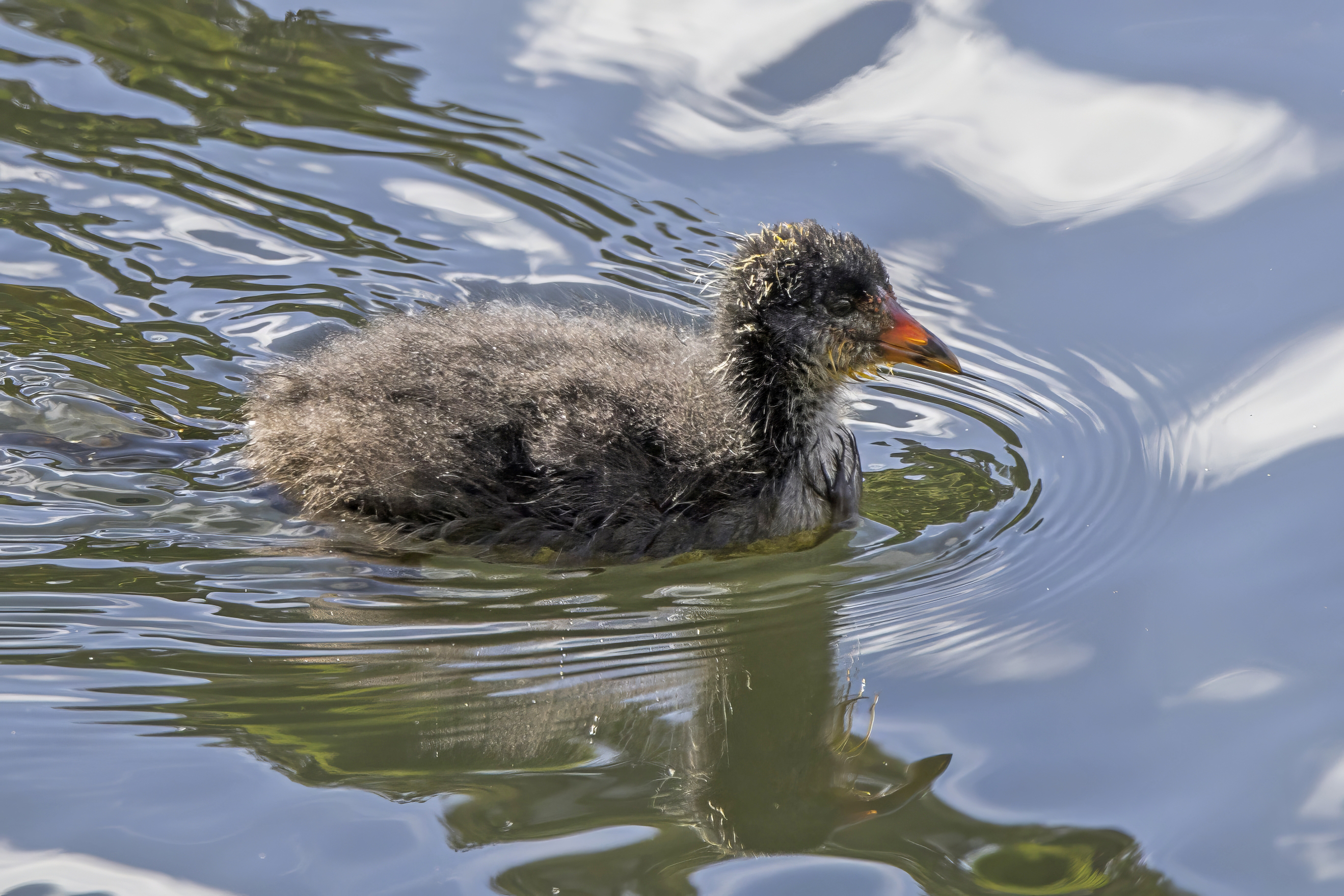
Juvenile F. a. australis

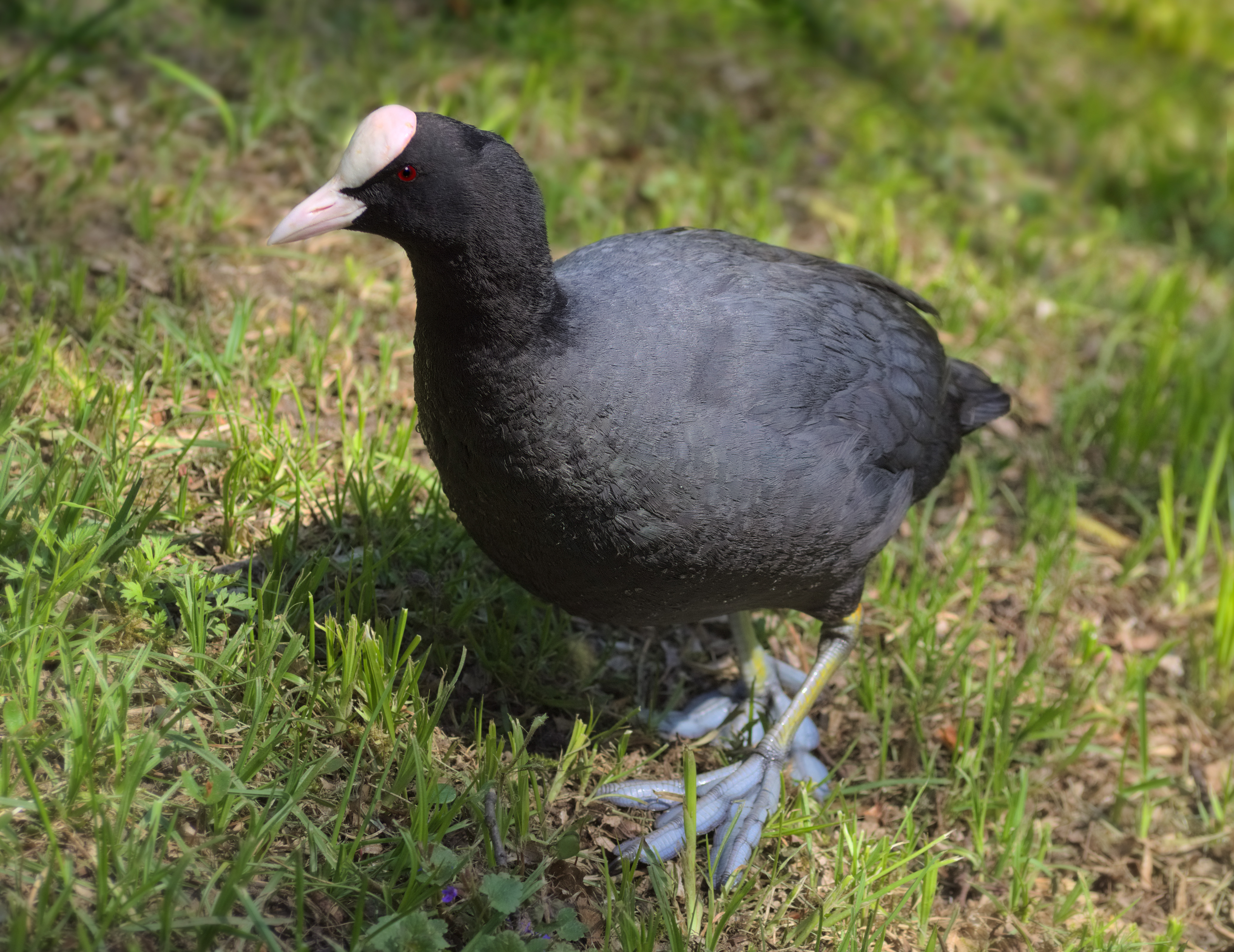
Adult F. a. atra

=== Feeding ===
The coot is an omnivore, and will take a variety of small live prey including the eggs of other water birds, as well as algae, vegetation, seeds and fruit. It shows considerable variation in its feeding techniques, grazing on land or in the water. In the water it may upend in the fashion of a mallard or dive in search of food.

== Status ==
The Eurasian coot is one of the species to which the Agreement on the Conservation of African-Eurasian Migratory Waterbirds (AEWA) applies.

== Sources ==
- Cramp, Stanley, ed. (1980). "Fulica atra Coot". Handbook of the Birds of Europe the Middle East and North Africa. The Birds of the Western Palearctic: Volume II: Hawks to Bustards. Oxford: Oxford University Press. pp. 599–610. ISBN 978-0-19-857505-4.
