= Clement Kengava =

Solomon Islands politician (born 1953)

Clement Kengava (born February 7, 1953) is a member of the National Parliament of the Solomon Islands. He represents a constituency on the island of Choiseul, and has served as Minister for Rural Development and Indigenous Affairs and as Minister for Health and Medical Services.
