= Malaita cicadabird =

Conservation status
- Not evaluated (IUCN 3.1)

Scientific classification
- Domain: Eukaryota
- Kingdom: Animalia
- Phylum: Chordata
- Class: Aves
- Order: Passeriformes
- Family: Campephagidae
- Genus: Edolisoma
- Species: E. tricolor

Binomial name
- Edolisoma tricolor Mayr, 1931

Synonyms
- Edolisoma holopolium tricolor (protonym); Coracina holopolium tricolor

Species of bird

The Malaita cicadabird (Edolisoma tricolor) is a passerine bird in the family Campephagidae that is endemic to the island of Malaita in the Solomon Islands archipelago. It was formerly considered to be a subspecies of the Solomons cicadabird.

== Taxonomy ==
The Malaita cicadabird was formally described in 1931 by the American ornithologist Ernst Mayr based on specimens collected on the island of Malaita in the Solomon Islands archipelago during the Whitney South Sea Expedition. Mayr considered his specimens to be from a subspecies of the Solomons cicadabird and coined the trinomial name Edolisoma holopolium tricolor. The bird is now elevated to species rank based on a molecular phylogenetic study published in 2018 and the differences in plumage and vocalization.
