= Frontal shield =

Type of bird anatomy

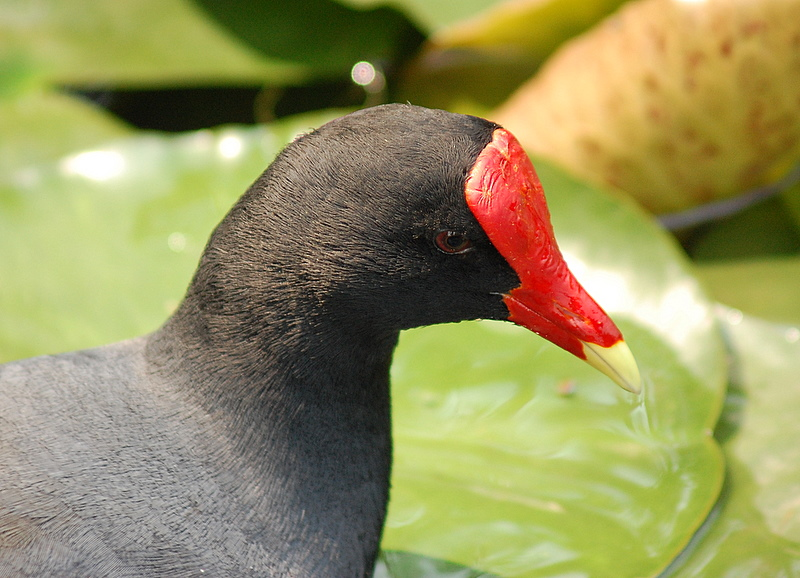
Common gallinule in Brazil

A frontal shield, also known as a facial shield or frontal plate, is a feature of the anatomy of several bird species. Located just above the upper mandible, and protruding along the forehead, it is composed of two main parts: a hard, proteinaceous callus and a soft, fleshy corium. It is thought to play roles in protection, mate identification, sexual selection, and territorial defense.

== Composition ==
The callus is a hard, keratinous section of the frontal plate located highest on the forehead. It is generally more pigmented than the surrounding corium. Underneath the callus is a Malpighian layer of tissue that connects the structure to the maxilla. This layer is supplied with blood via vessel-containing dermal papillae. It has been observed to resemble the texture of calloused human skin. The corium is a thick, dense mass of connective tissue fibers that makes up the largest portion of the frontal plate. It contains layers of cells that aide in enlarging or flattening the structure. The corium may also be pigmented, but is clearly delineated from the callus by size and texture. A posterior muscle attachment and cell layers within the corium allow it to change shape between enlarged, semi-enlarged, and flattened. The cell layers become vacuolated to cause enlargement, and may return to normal to cause flattening.

== Function ==
A strong correlation between frontal plate state and season has been observed. During winter months, the frontal plate remains flattened and small. This may help to protect the tissue from cold conditions. During the breeding season in the warmer months, the frontal plate becomes enlarged as a method to attract mates, and scare away other individuals competing for a mate. The fully enlarged form of the frontal plate can be double the size when flattened. Territorial males will enlarge their corium and raise the feathers on the back of their neck to appear larger and more threatening to competing males. Research has also suggested that the shape of the callus serves as an identifying feature for mating pairs. Birds have been observed to show aggression towards another individual in their territory until that individual's frontal plate is fully visible. After recognition, normal pair behavior commences. It consists of a hard or fleshy plate of specialised skin extending from the base of the upper bill over the forehead. The size, shape and colour may exhibit testosterone-dependent variation in either sex during the year. Functionality appears to relate to protection of the face while feeding in, or moving through, dense vegetation, as well as to courtship display and territorial defence. It is a characteristic of some water birds in the rail family, especially the gallinules and moorhens, swamphens and coots, as well as in the Jacana family. The watercock's frontal shield is extended above the head into a horn-like protuberance. A bird from a different order, the extinct Choiseul pigeon, had a blue frontal shield.

== Gallery ==
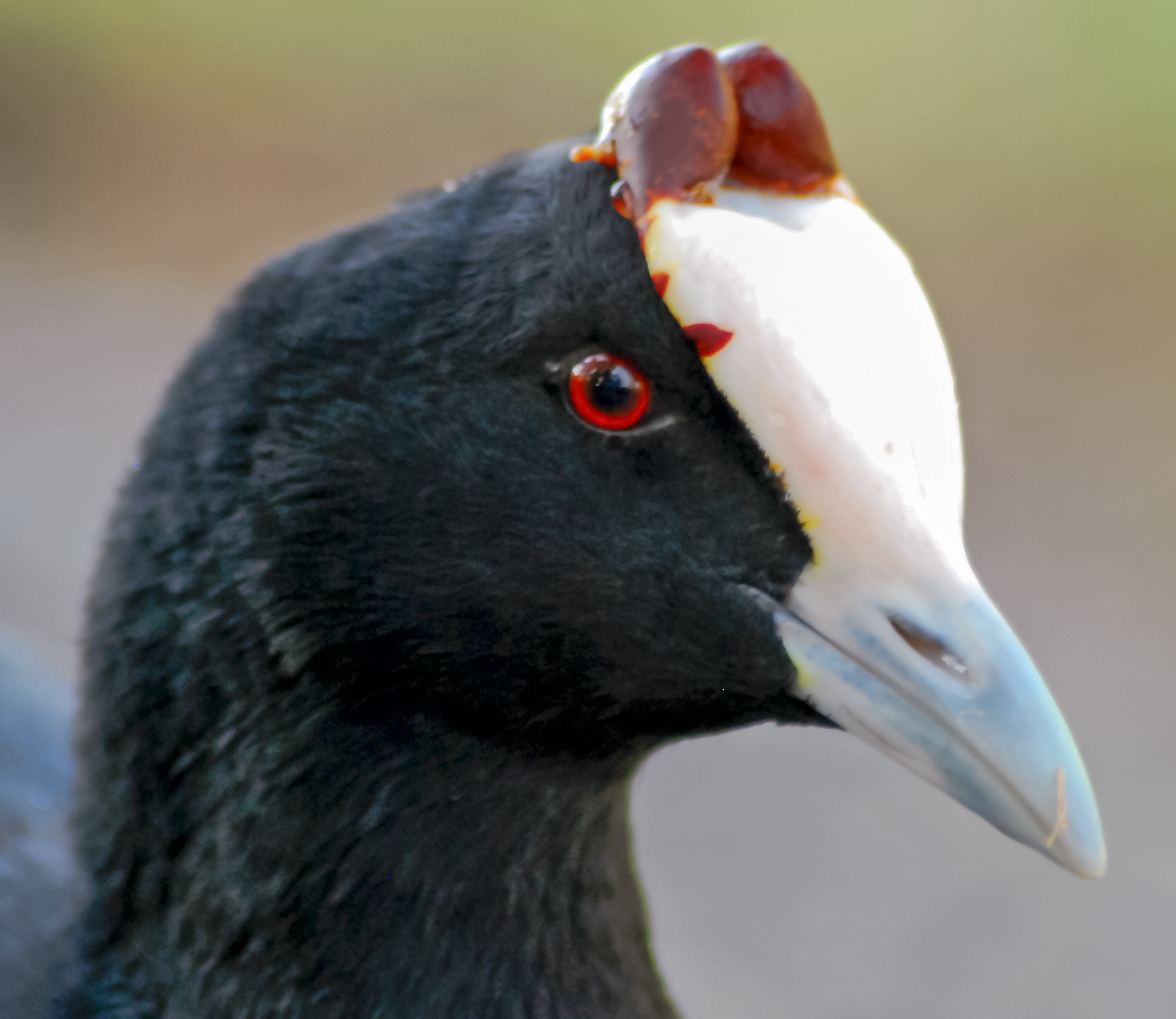
Red-knobbed coot

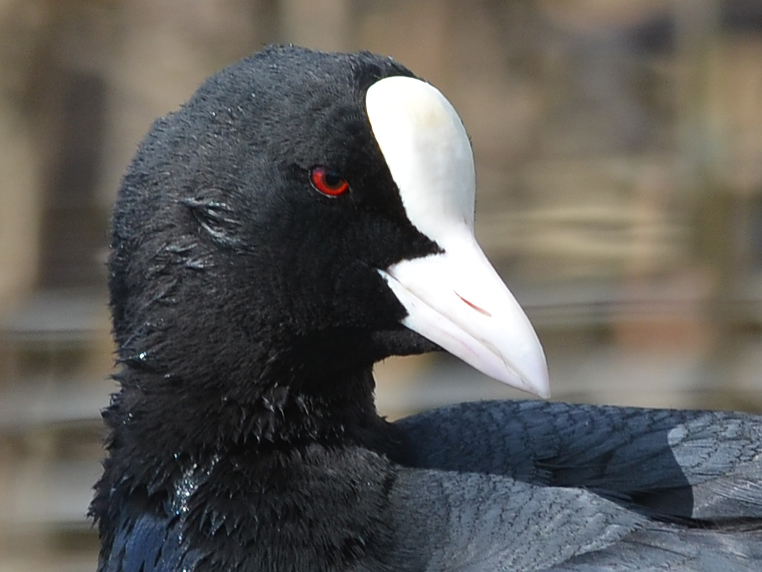
Eurasian coot

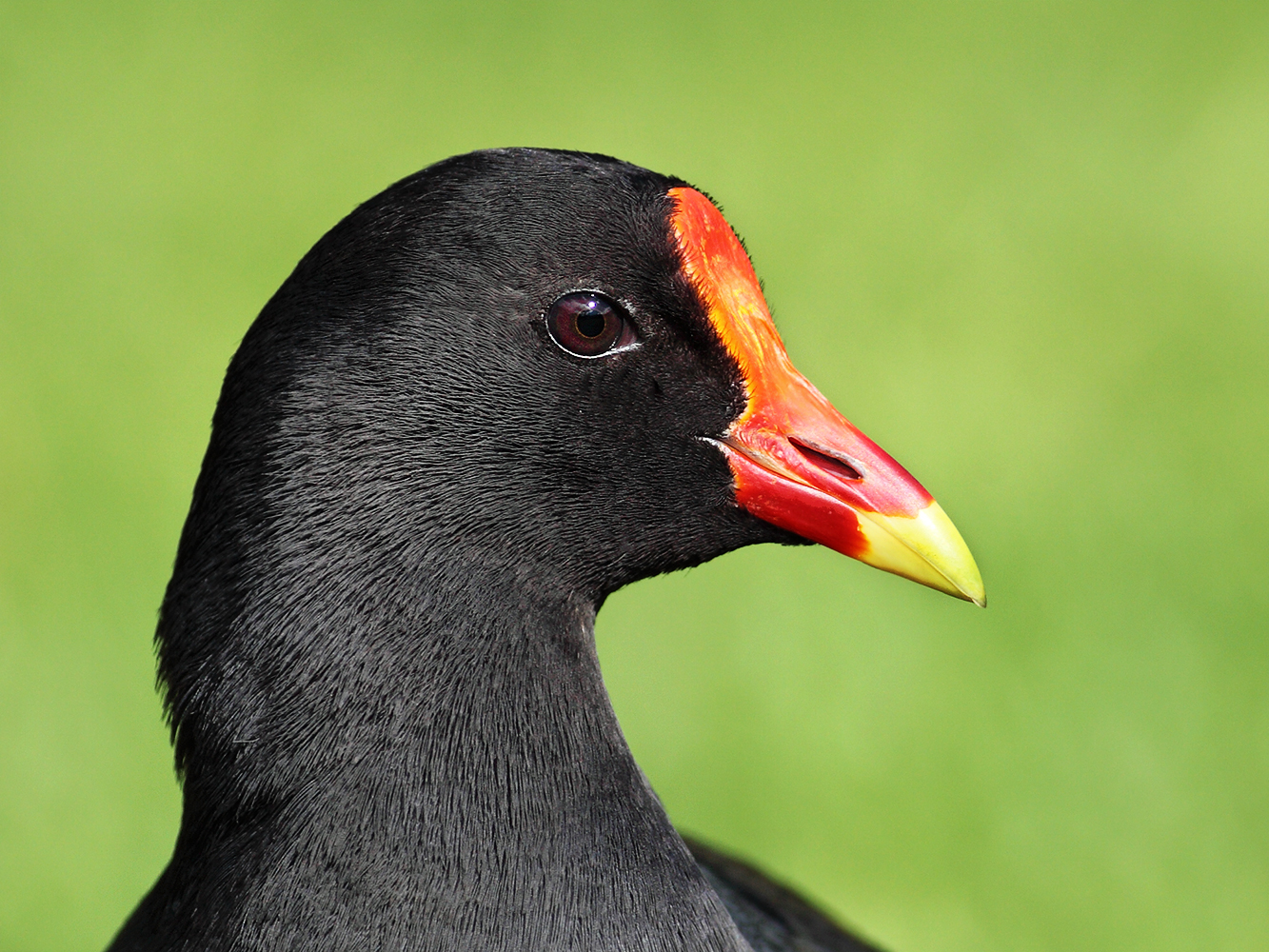
Dusky moorhen

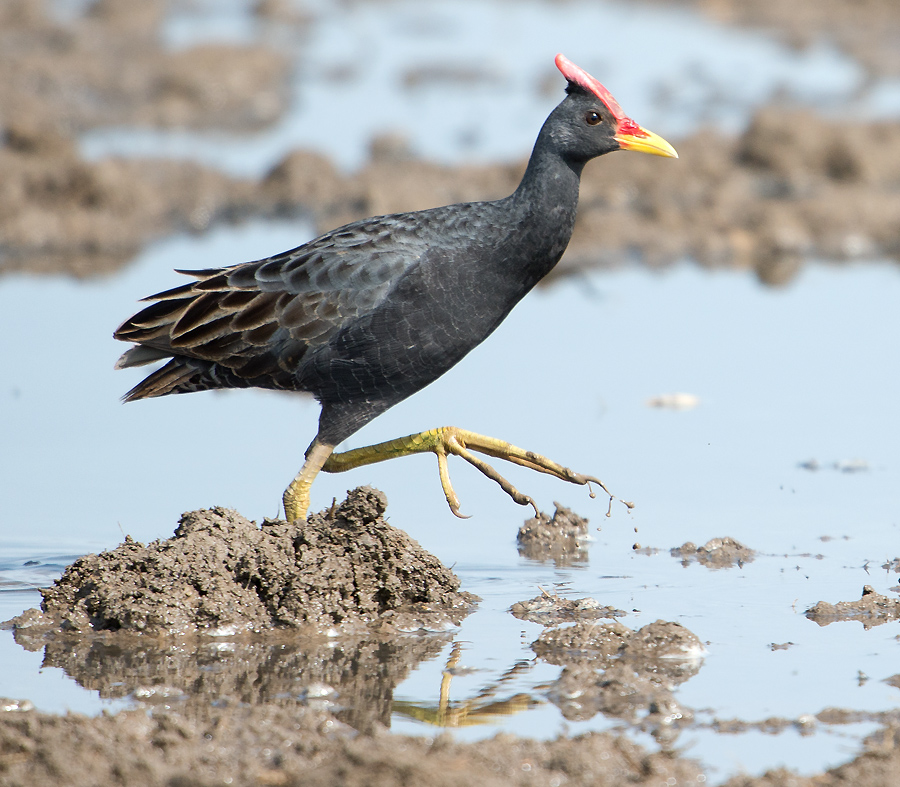
Watercock

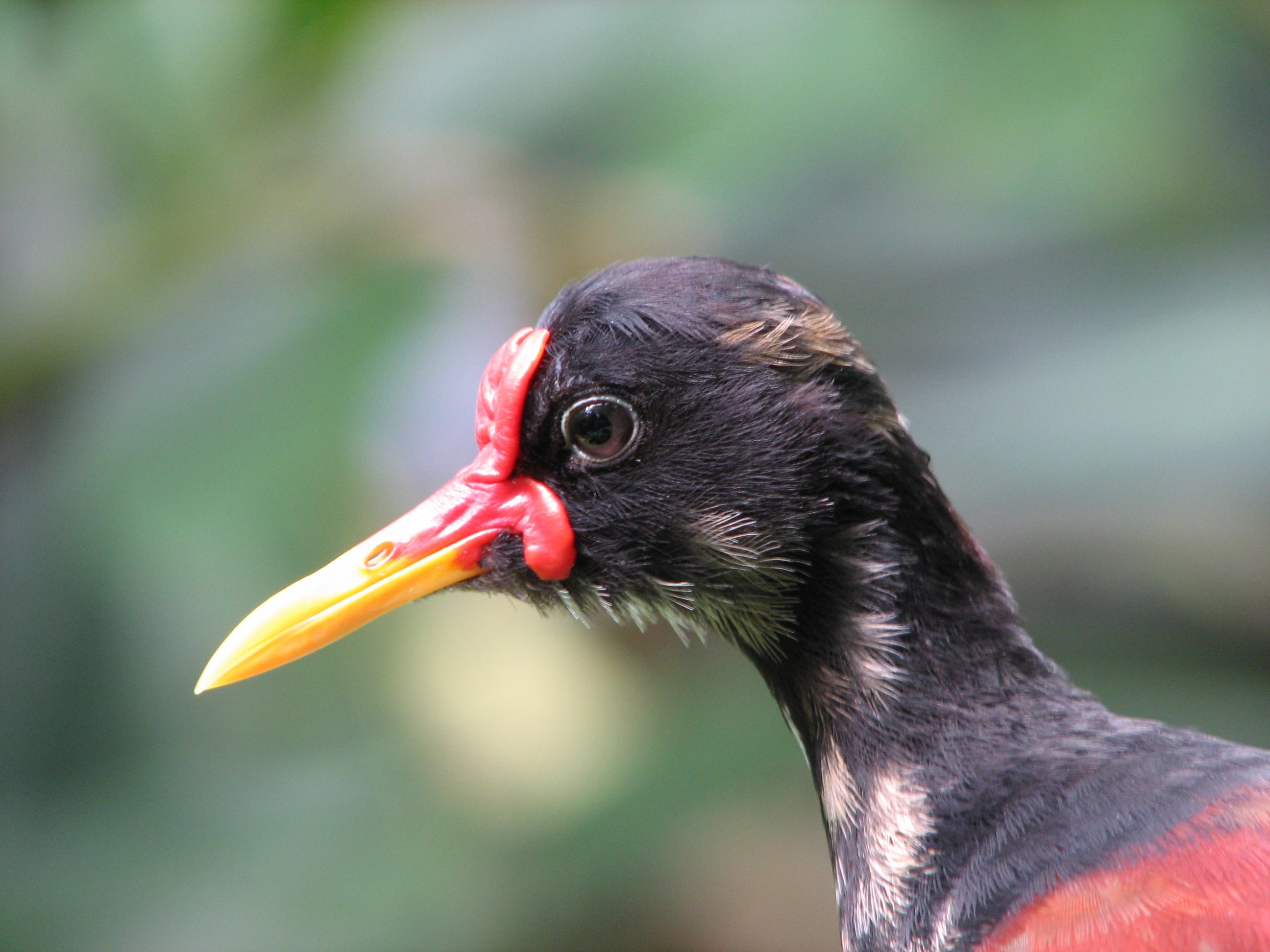
Wattled jacana

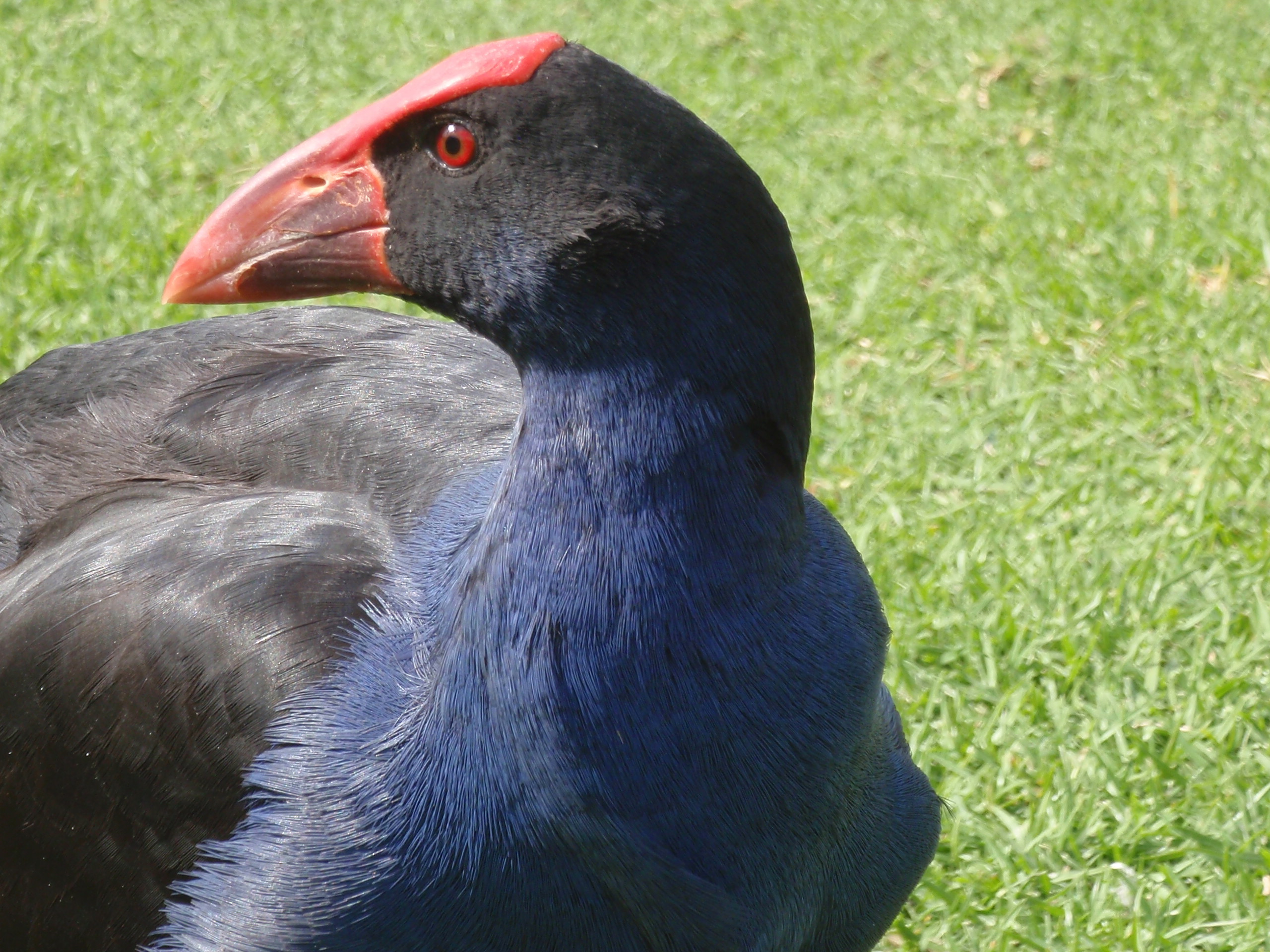
Australasian swamphen

== See also ==
- Casque (anatomy)
- Comb (anatomy)
- Crest (feathers)
- Fecal shield
- Frontal scale
- Wattle (anatomy)
