= Nuatambu =

Nuatambu Island
- Nuatambu
- Location in Solomon Islands
- Coordinates: 007°07′26.42″S 157°09′39.99″E
- Country: Solomon Islands
- Province: Choiseul Province

Population (2024)
  - Total: approximately 25 families

Nuatambu is an island in Solomon Islands in Choiseul Province. Nuatambu is home to families. In 2021, the island was reported to have been separated into two islands. As of December 2023, it shows up on Google Maps as a contiguous island.

In 1962, the island had an area of 30,080 square meters. In 2014, the area was measured as 13,980 square meters. The difference has been attributed to the rise in sea level due to climate change. In 2016, The Guardian reported the island had been diminished by sea level rise and wave action.

== Impact of sea-level rise on Nuatambu ==
Five reef islands in the Solomon Islands have been completely submerged due to rising sea levels, while an additional six islands have experienced severe coastal erosion. These lost islands varied in size from one to five hectares and were characterized by dense tropical vegetation that had thrived for at least 300 years.

Nuatambu Island, which was once home to 35 families, has seen over half of its habitable area eroded away, with 75% of its houses destroyed by the sea since 2011

== See also ==
- 2011 Tōhoku earthquake and tsunami
