= Wagina Island =

Island in Solomon Islands

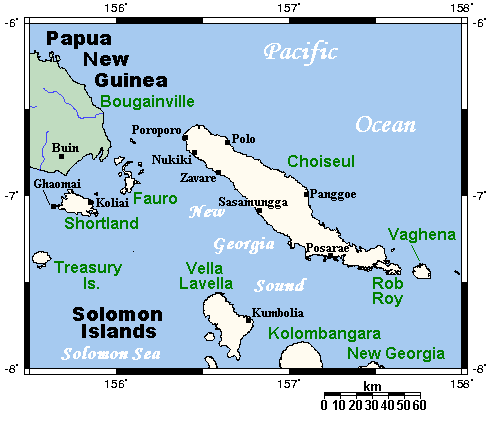

- Location within Solomon Islands

Geography
- Location: Pacific Ocean
- Coordinates: 7°26′S 157°46′E
- Archipelago: Solomon Islands
- Area: 110 km^{2} (42 sq mi)
- Highest elevation: 42 m (138 ft)

Administration
- Solomon Islands

Demographics
- Population: 1636 (2009)

Wagina Island (also Wiginna Island locally known as Vaghena Island) is a small island in the country of Solomon Islands. The easiest way to reach Wagina is by plane to Kaghau Airport, Choiseul Province, from Honiara (currently twice a week). From Kagau, it takes about 45 – 60 minutes by outboard motor canoe to Wagina.

== Population ==
There are three villages in Wagina: Kukutin, Arariki and Nikumaroro. The inhabitants of this island are ethnic I-Kiribati (Micronesians), who were relocated to the British Solomon Islands Protectorate from the islands of Orona (Hull Island) and Nikumaroro (Gardener Island) in the 1950s. This was subsequent to them having been settled on these previously uninhabited islands in the Phoenix Islands from various islands in the Gilberts archipelago in the 1930s. The original resettlement in the 1930s was on alleged grounds of overcrowding, particularly on drought-prone islands in the southern Gilberts. The second resettlement was on alleged grounds of the islands in the Phoenix group having harsh living conditions and also being prone to drought, although remoteness and costs falling on the colonial administration also played parts.
