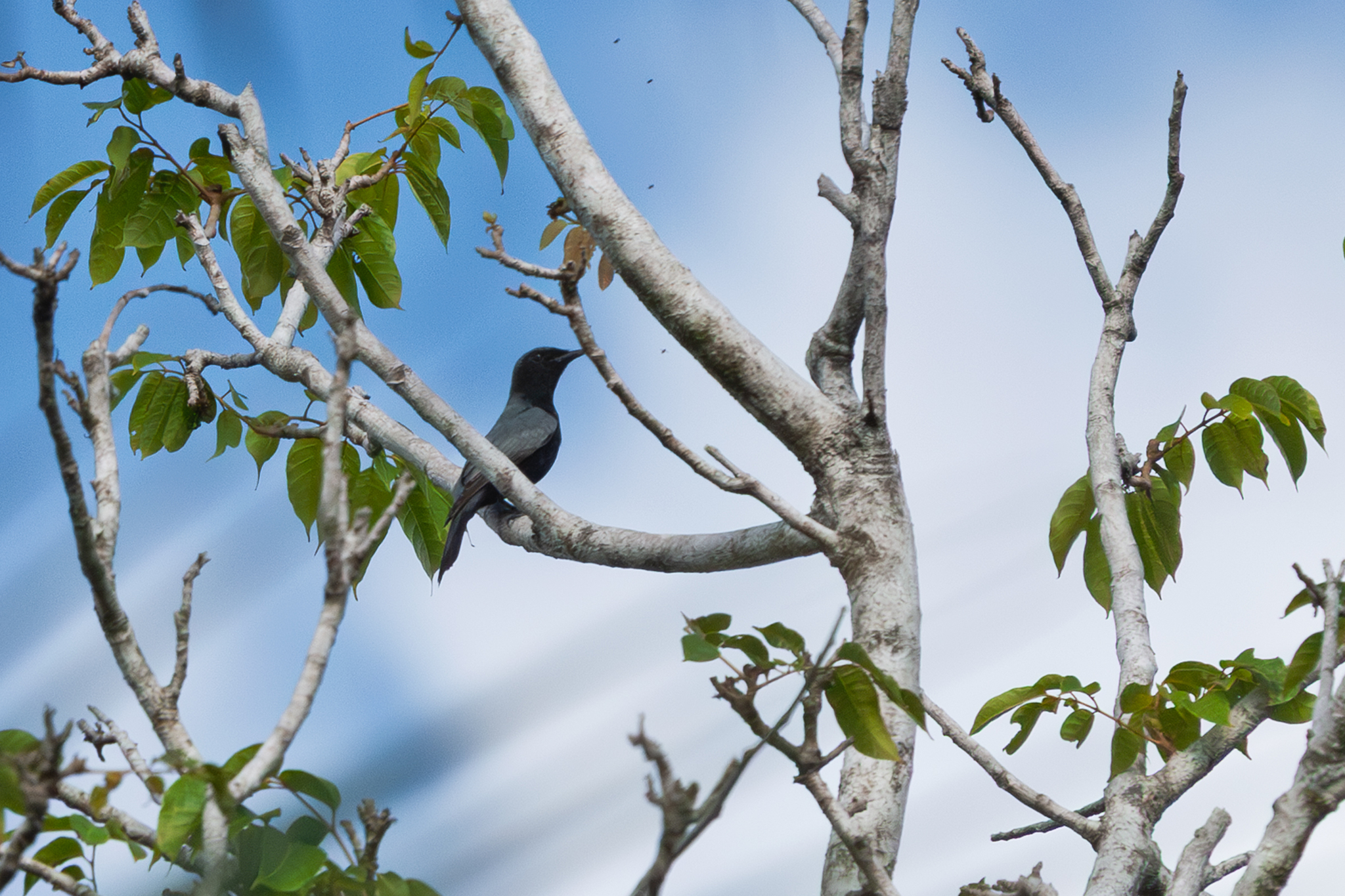

Conservation status
- Near Threatened (IUCN 3.1)

Scientific classification
- Kingdom: Animalia
- Phylum: Chordata
- Class: Aves
- Order: Passeriformes
- Family: Campephagidae
- Genus: Edolisoma
- Species: E. holopolium

Binomial name
- Edolisoma holopolium (Sharpe, 1888)

Synonyms
- Coracina holopolia

= Solomons cicadabird =

Species of bird

The Solomons cicadabird (Edolisoma holopolium), also known as Solomons cuckooshrike and black-bellied cicadabird, is a species of bird in the family Campephagidae. It is found in the north and central islands of the Solomon Islands archipelago. Its natural habitat is subtropical or tropical moist lowland forests. It is threatened by habitat loss. It was formerly considered to be conspecific with the Malaita cicadabird (Edolisoma tricolor).
