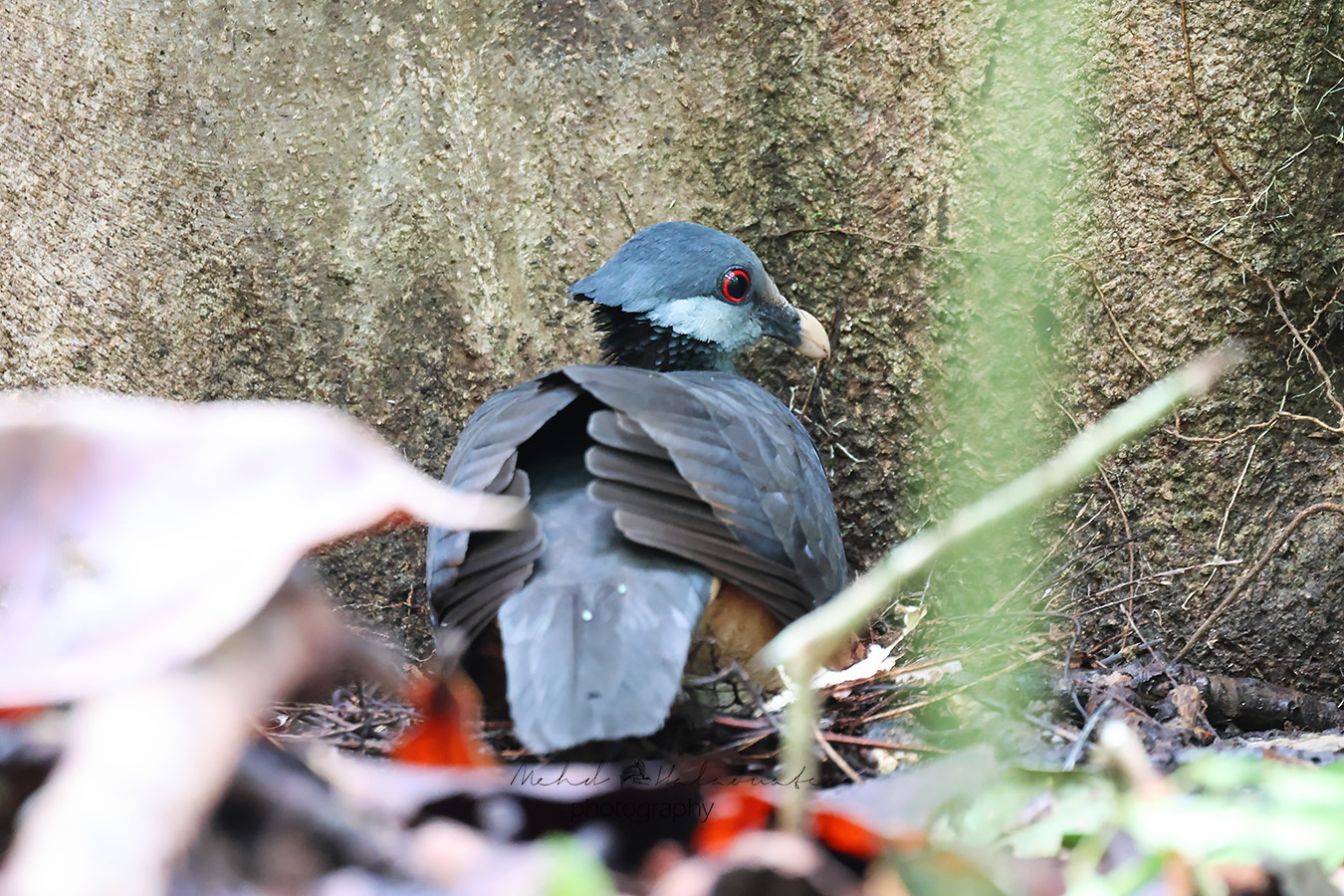

Conservation status
- Least Concern (IUCN 3.1)

Scientific classification
- Kingdom: Animalia
- Phylum: Chordata
- Class: Aves
- Order: Columbiformes
- Family: Columbidae
- Tribe: Raphini
- Genus: Trugon; Gray, 1849
- Species: T. terrestris

Binomial name
- Trugon terrestris G.R. Gray, 1849

= Thick-billed ground pigeon =

Species of bird

The thick-billed ground pigeon (Trugon terrestris), also known as the jungle pigeon or the slaty/grey ground pigeon, is a species of bird in the family Columbidae. It is monotypic within the genus Trugon. Native to New Guinea, its natural habitat is moist tropical lowland forest.

== Description ==
This robust species grows to a length of 33 cm (13 in); the sexes are similar in appearance. The upper parts are a uniform bluish-grey or brownish-grey, the breast is grey and the belly orangey-buff. The beak is broad with a pale tip, the ear coverts are pale and there is a short crest on the nape. The underwing coverts are boldly streaked in black and white but the tail is unbanded. The legs are pink.

== Distribution and habitat ==
The range is restricted to the island of New Guinea. Its habitat is lowland forest at altitudes up to about 650 m (2,000 ft). Although usually found in primary humid forest, it seems to be able to make use of partially cleared areas.

== Ecology ==
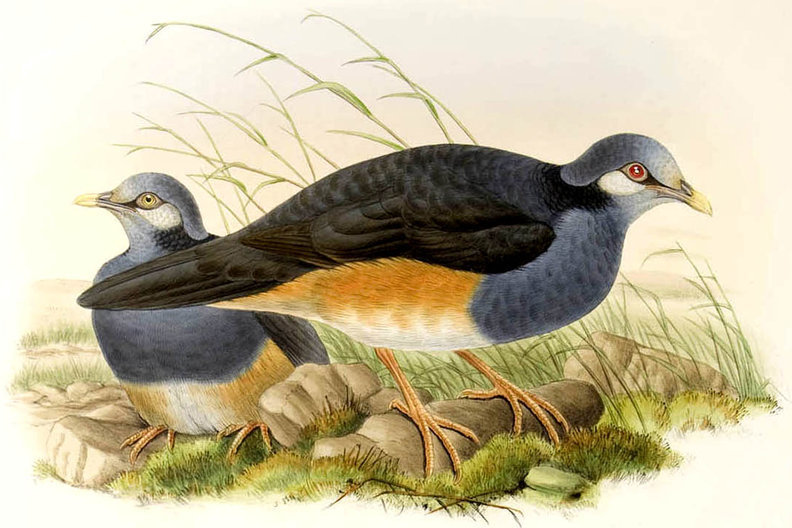
Illustration by John Gould

The thick-billed ground pigeon usually forages alone, but is sometimes seen in pairs. It is generally shy, staying mainly on the ground and running away into the undergrowth when disturbed, but launching itself vigorously into the air with rapidly beating wings when it feels threatened. It flicks its tail downwards frequently as it walks. It feeds on fruits and seeds that have fallen to the ground. It picks up fruit with its beak and hammers it on the ground to split it, exposing and eating the seeds. Small items are swallowed whole. It sometimes visits the display arenas of the magnificent bird-of-paradise in order to forage for regurgitated seeds.

This bird roosts at night on low branches. Breeding seems to take place at any time of year, with nests having been found between February and October. The nest is a hollow in the ground, perhaps concealed between the buttress roots of a large tree. It may be unlined or may incorporate a few twigs or leaves, or may be rather more elaborate. A single white egg is laid and is incubated by both parents, the male routinely sitting during the daytime. The fledged chick stays in its parents' territory for about a month.

== Status ==
The thick-billed ground pigeon is generally uncommon; in one area it was estimated that one bird was present in every 10 hectares (25 acres). Their population trend is considered to be stable. It has a very wide range and does not seem to be subject to any particular threats, so the International Union for Conservation of Nature has assessed its conservation status as being of "least concern".
