= Choiseul Island =

Island in the Solomon Islands

Choiseul
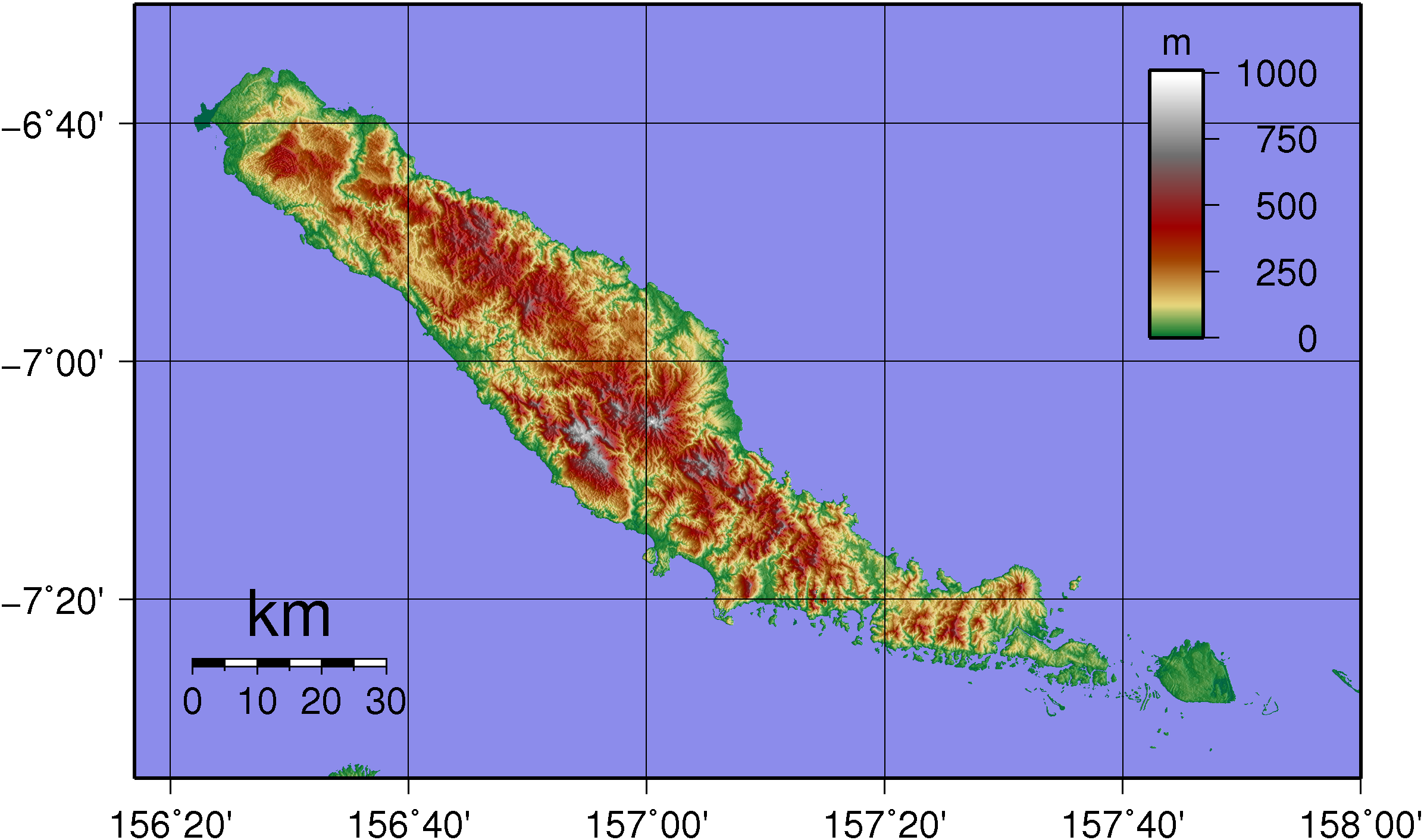
- Topographic map of Choiseul

- Location within Solomon Islands

Geography
- Location: South Pacific
- Coordinates: 7.08°S 157.0°E
- Archipelago: Solomon Islands (archipelago)
- Area: 2,971 km^{2} (1,147 sq mi)
- Highest elevation: 1,067 m (3501 ft)
- Highest point: Mount Maetambe

Administration
- Solomon Islands
- Province: Choiseul Province

Demographics
- Population: 36,719 (2020)

Choiseul Island, native name Lauru, is the largest island (2,971 km^{2} (1,147 sq mi)) of the Choiseul Province, Solomon Islands, at 7.08°S 157°E. The administrative headquarters of Choiseul Province is situated in the town of Taro, on Taro Island.

== History ==
In 1768, the French explorer Louis Antoine de Bougainville named the island after the then French foreign minister, Étienne François, duc de Choiseul.

The first recorded sighting by Europeans was by the Spanish expedition of Álvaro de Mendaña in April 1568. More precisely the sighting was due to a local voyage done by a small boat, in the accounts the brigantine Santiago, commanded by Maestre de Campo Pedro Ortega Valencia and having Hernán Gallego as pilot. They charted it as San Marcos, and also named the narrow channel separating San Jorge from Santa Isabel Island as the Ortega channel after the commander of the expedition.

In the nineteenth century Choiseul islanders suffered attacks from blackbirding (the often brutal recruitment or kidnapping of labourers for the sugar plantations in Queensland and Fiji).

In April 1885, the German Empire declared a Protectorate over the North Solomon Islands, including Choiseul. In 1900, under the terms of Treaty of Berlin, signed on 14 November 1899, Germany transferred the North Solomon Islands (except for Bougainville and its surrounding islands) to the British Solomon Islands Protectorate in exchange for the British giving up all claims to Samoa. Missionaries settled on Choiseul under both protectorates, converting most of the population to Christianity. In the early 20th century several British and Australian firms began large-scale coconut planting.

The Austrian anthropologist and photographer Hugo Bernatzik visited Choiseul in 1932. Bernatzik documented some of the few remaining ancestral customs of the island people and described them in an ethnography that he published a few years later. He also took some photographs of the islanders and brought back a stone urn with carvings, reflecting a culture that he deemed was dying in contact with the modern world.

During World War II Japanese forces occupied Choiseul in 1942. A battalion of US Marines carried out a raid on the island in October – November 1943, to divert attention away from the Landings at Cape Torokina.

Following the independence of the Solomon Islands in July 1978, Choiseul has been administered as part of Choiseul Province.

== Languages ==
The population of the island speaks Austronesian languages: Vaghua, Varisi, Ririo, Central Eastern Choiseul.

== Environment ==
=== Mount Maetambe – Kolombangara River Important Bird Area ===
This 78,398 ha site in central Choiseul has been identified by BirdLife International as an Important Bird Area (IBA) because it supports populations of threatened or endemic bird species. It covers a tract of intact forest extending from the south-western coast of the island, between the Vurulato and Sepa rivers, reaching an altitude of 800 m. This is the best example of karst limestone forest in the Solomons. The eroding limestone has formed a landscape of caves and subterranean rivers. Mount Maetambae is an extinct volcano. A potential threat to the biodiversity of the site is logging. Bird species for which the site was identified as an IBA include Melanesian scrubfowl, crested cuckoo-doves, red-knobbed imperial pigeons, Solomons boobooks, imitator goshawks, Sanford's sea eagles, ultramarine kingfishers, Solomons cockatoos, song parrots, Finsch's pygmy parrots, black-faced pittas, red-capped myzomelas, Solomons cuckooshrikes, white-winged fantails, steel-blue flycatchers, Solomons pied monarchs, chestnut-bellied monarchs, white-billed crows, yellow-throated white-eyes and midget flowerpeckers. The Solomons frogmouth has also been reported from these forests.

== See also ==
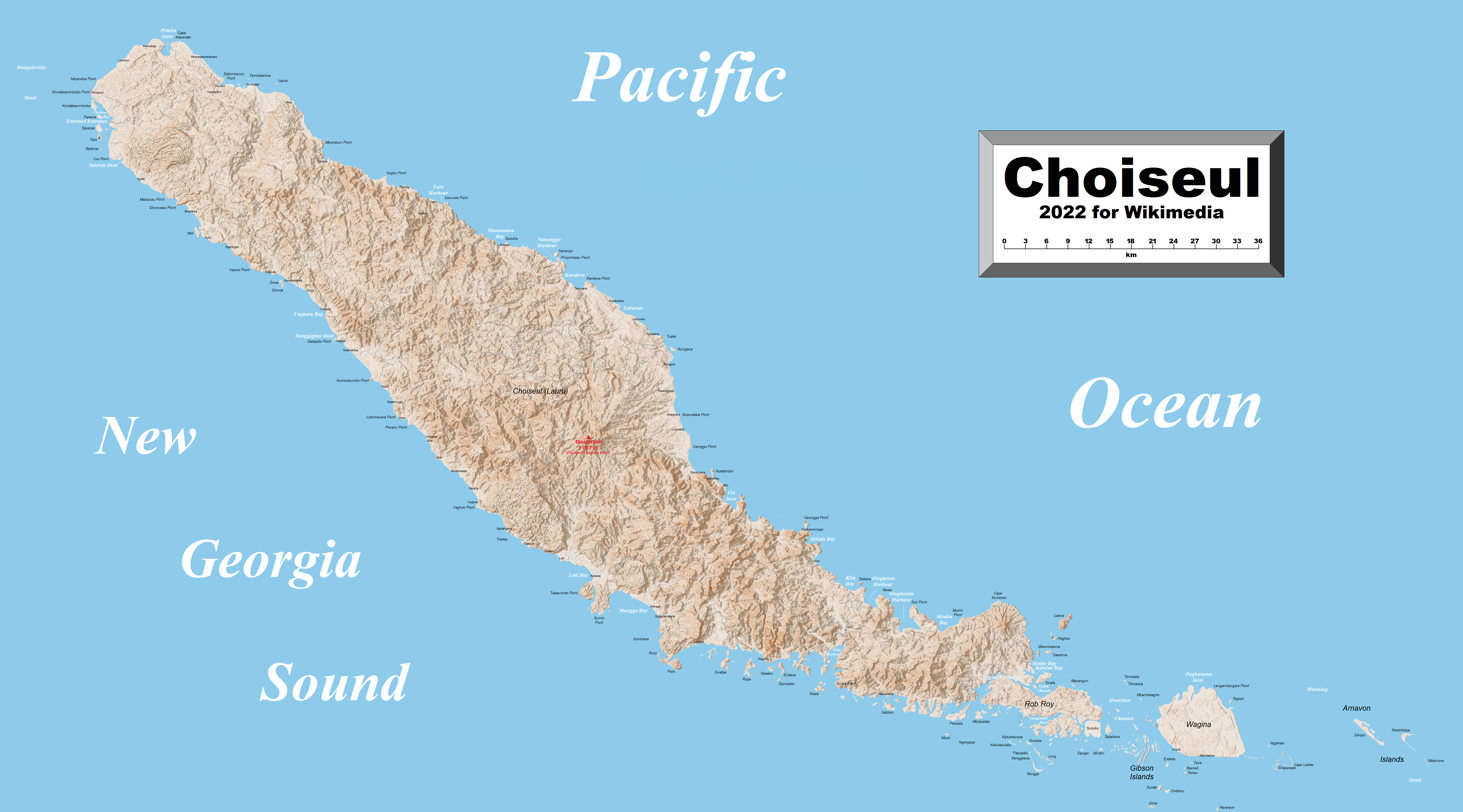
Detailed map of Choiseul

- Raid on Choiseul
- New Georgia Sound
- Choiseul pigeon
