= Asia Pacific Airlines (PNG) =

- Founded: 1991
- Operating bases: Tabubil Airport, Papua New Guinea
- Fleet size: 3
- Destinations: See Destinations below
- Parent company: National Jet Express
- Headquarters: Tabubil, Papua New Guinea
- Employees: 42

Asia Pacific Airlines is an airline based in Tabubil, Papua New Guinea. It is a subsidiary of National Jet Express. It operates domestic services, as well as flights to Cairns, Australia. Its main base is Tabubil Airport.

== History ==
The airline was established in 1991 and was registered as Fubilan Air Transport between 1996 and 2000. It has 42 employees and three Bombardier Dash 8 aircraft in Australia and Papua New Guinea.

== Fleet ==
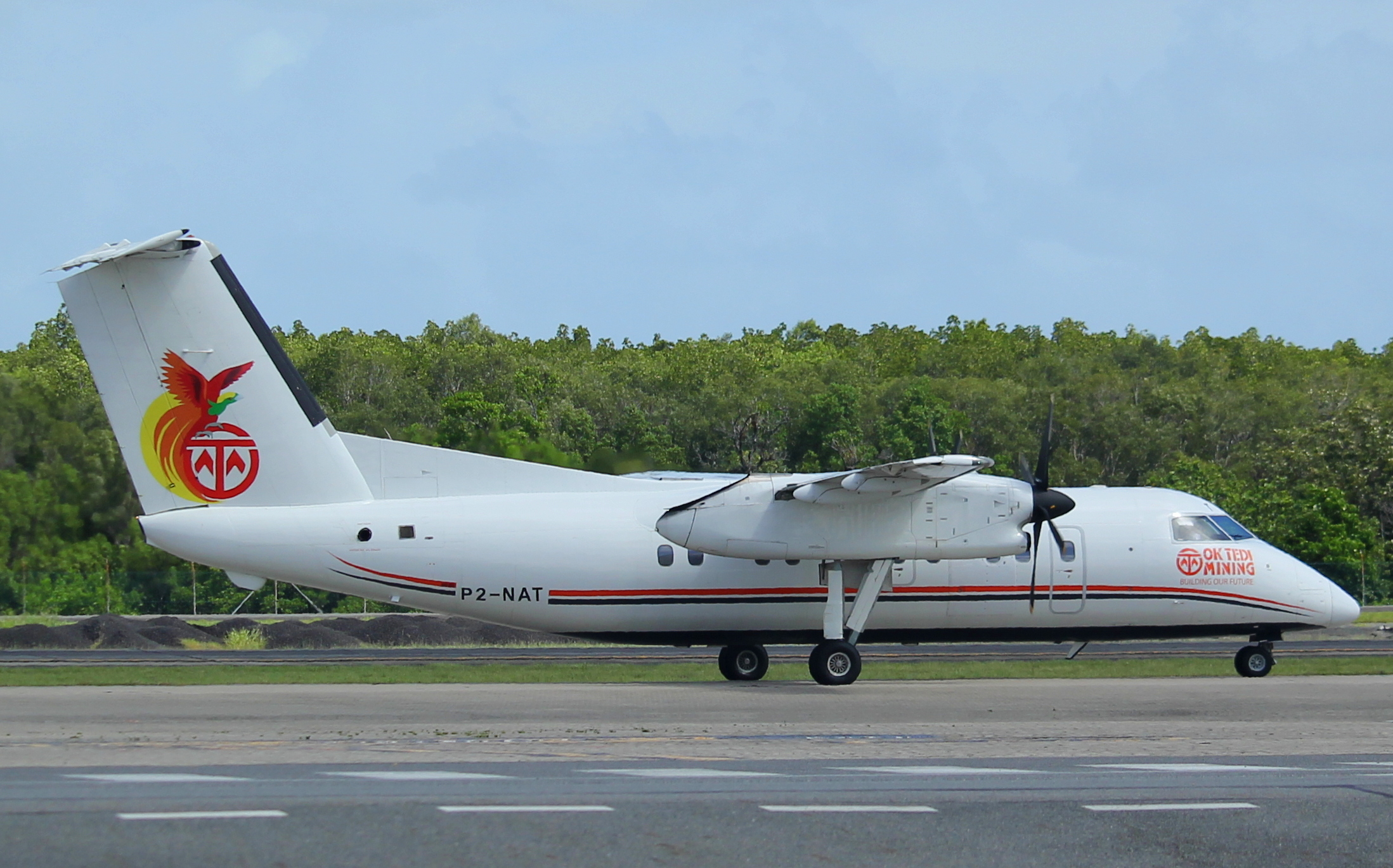
de Havilland Canada DHC-8 operated for Ok Tedi Mining Limited at Cairns Airport (2017)

As of August 2025, Asia Pacific Airlines (PNG) operates the following aircraft:

Asia Pacific Airlines fleet
Aircraft	In service	Orders	Passengers	Notes
Bombardier Dash 8-100	3	—	36	
Total	3			

== Destinations ==
Scheduled destinations for Ok Tedi Mine:

- Queensland
  - Cairns (Cairns Airport)
  - Horn Island (Horn Island Airport)
- Papua New Guinea
  - Tabubil (Tabubil Airport)
  - Port Moresby (Jacksons Airport)
  - Lae (Nadzab Airport)
  - Madang (Madang Airport)
  - Mount Hagen (Kagamuga Airport)
  - Goroka (Goroka Airport)
  - Wewak (Boram Airport)
  - Hoskins (Hoskins Airport)
  - Rabaul (Tokua Airport)
  - Buka (Buka Airport)
  - Kavieng (Kavieng Airport)
  - Manus (Momote Airport)
  - Alotau (Gurney Airport)

== See also ==
- List of airlines of Papua New Guinea
