= Airlink (Papua New Guinea) =

Regional airline (1989-2007)

| IATA | ICAO | Call sign |
|---|---|---|
| ND | — | — |
- Founded: 1989
- Commenced operations: June 1990
- Ceased operations: 27 July 2007
- Operating bases: Madang Airport
- Hubs: Rabaul Airport; Kavieng Airport; Wewak International Airport; Mount Hagen Airport
- Fleet size: See Fleet below
- Destinations: See Services below
- Headquarters: Madang, Papua New Guinea

Airlink was an airline based in Madang, Papua New Guinea that ceased operations in late July 2007. It provided high-frequency scheduled and charter services to outlying regions of Papua New Guinea. Its main base was Madang Airport, with hubs at Rabaul Airport, Kavieng Airport, Wewak International Airport and Mount Hagen Airport.

== Code data ==
- IATA Code: ND

== History ==
The airline was established in 1989 and started scheduled operations in June 1990. It bought out the assets of Talair in the New Guinea Islands Region in October 1990. The company suffered considerable hardships due to the 1994 Rabaul volcanic eruptions, including the loss of four aircraft.

=== Accidents and incidents ===
- On 30 March 2007, an Airlink Embraer EMB-110-P1 Bandeirante carrying newspapers crashed in West New Britain province between Gasmata and Kandrian. Both pilots were instantly killed whilst faulty maintenance is suspected.
- Two weeks later on 13 April 2007, Airlink Flight P2ALK, a Cessna 404 Titan crashed on landing at Goroka Airport. The three women and the pilot on board survived. The plane was in a holding pattern over the airport and waiting for low clouds to lift. Pilot error is believed to be the cause as the pilot proceeded to land in the wrong direction on a one-way strip and overran the runway.

Airlink suffered two fatal crashes in 1999, when an Islander crashed near Hoskins in West New Britain Province, killing all aboard, and a couple of months later when an Embraer EMB-110-P1 Bandeirante flew into terrain on the eastern approach to Goroka (also pilot error).

=== Shutdown ===
Airlink ceased operations on 27 July 2007 as a result of "business difficulties". It had 200 employees. The airline's operating licence had only been re-issued a few days earlier, after a period of suspension starting in May following two serious accidents (as described above). One plane had crashed in West New Britain while a second had crashed on landing in Goroka.

The loss of the airline was described as "sad and disappointing" by outgoing Madang Governor Sir Peter Barter, who said that the closure would affect the transport of people and cargo, including vital medical supplies.

== Services ==
Airlink operated services to the following domestic scheduled destinations (at January 2005): Bialla, Buka, Cape Orford, Gasmata, Gonalia, Goroka, Hoskins, Jacquinot Bay, Kandrian, Kavieng, Kiunga, Lae, Lihir Island, Madang, Mount Hagen, Namatanai, Nissan Island, Port Moresby, Rabaul, Tabubil, Tadji, Talasea, Tari, Vanimo and Wewak.

== Fleet ==
The Airlink fleet consisted of the following aircraft (at March 2007):

- 1 ATR 42-320
- 3 Britten-Norman BN-2A Islander
- 6 Embraer EMB-110-P1 Bandeirante

=== Previously operated ===
At January 2005 the airline also operated:

- Cessna 402

- DHC6 - Twin Otter
