= Ansett Airlines of Papua New Guinea =

Airline of Papua New Guinea (1936–1973)

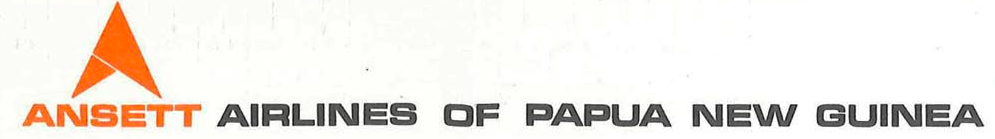
IATA	ICAO	Call sign
PN	—	—
- Commenced operations: 1936
- Ceased operations: 1973
- Operating bases: Wewak
- Parent company: Ansett Airlines of Australia

Ansett Airlines of Papua New Guinea was a Papua New Guinea airline and Ansett subsidiary founded in 1936 as Mandated Airlines.

== History ==
Ansett Airlines of Papua New Guinea was established in 1936 as Mandated Airlines when W.R. Carpenter & Co (Aerial Service) merged with Pacific Aerial Transport. The airline began operations from Salamaua. The airline was one of many companies established to link the goldfields of New Guinea to points in Australia. In February 1942 the airline ceased operations due to the Japanese invasion of Papua New Guinea with some aircraft being lost, however the airline re-started operations in 1945. In the aftermath of the war Mandated Airlines began to acquire and incorporate other airlines such as: Island Airways in 1948 and Gibbes Sepik Airways and Madang Air Services in 1960.

In January 1961 Mandated Airlines was purchased by Ansett Australian and subsequently re-branded as Ansett MAL with its route network and fleet remaining unchanged. Ansett MAL operated throughout Papua New Guinea in combination with other airline subsidiaries such as TAA Sunbird and SAATS East Indonesia. In 1968 the airline was renamed again, with Ansett Airlines of Papua New Guinea being the airlines final name. In 1970 the airline acquired Papuan Airlines. The airline finally ceased operations in 1973.

== Destinations ==
Throughout its existence Ansett Airlines of Papua New Guinea operated to:

- Aitape
- Ambunti
- Anogram
- Banz
- Brisbane
- Bulolo
- Cairns
- Erave, (Papua New Guinea), Kagua-Erave District)
- Goroka
- Hayfield
- Ialibu
- Kagua
- Kavieng
- Kundiwa
- Lae
- Lumi
- Madang
- Melbourne
- Mendi
- Minj
- Momote
- Mt Hagen
- Nuku
- Port Moresby
- Rabual
- Sydney
- Tari
- Telefomin
- Townsville
- Vanimo
- Wabag
- Wapenamenda
- Wau
- Wewak
- Yangoru

== Fleet ==
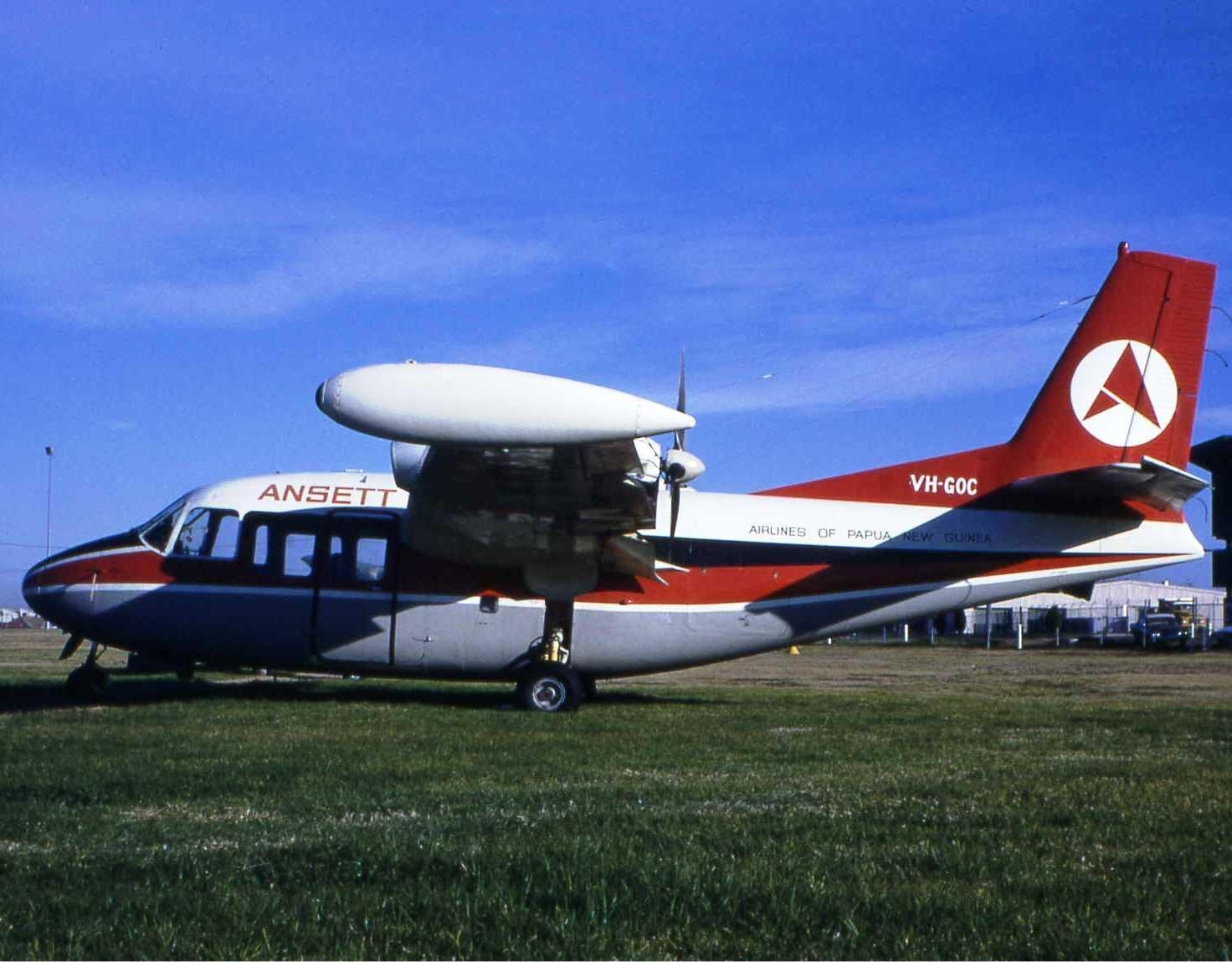
An Ansett Airlines of Papua New Guinea Piaggio P-166

Throughout its existence Ansett Airlines of Papua New Guinea operated:

- Avro 642
- Bristol Freighter
- Cessna 336
- De Havilland Dragon
- De Havilland Dove
- De Havilland Canada DHC-6 Twin Otter
- De Havilland Canada DHC-4 Caribou
- Douglas C-47
- Douglas DC-3
- Douglas DC-6
- Fokker F.27
- Let L-200 Morava
- Lockheed 414
- Piaggio P.166
- Short Skyvan

== Accidents and incidents ==
- On July 17, 1972 a Douglas C-47 veered off a runway after the aircraft's gear collapsed. The aircraft's crew escaped unharmed.
- On September 1, 1972, a Short Skyvan crashed on northeastern slope of Mt Giluwe due to poor visibility. Four people died as result of the crash.
- On October 30, 1972, a DC-3 overran the runway at Madang Airport after the aircraft encountered difficulties trying decelerate properly. There were no casualties but the aircraft was written off.
