= Tufi Airport =

Airport in Tufi, Papua New Guinea

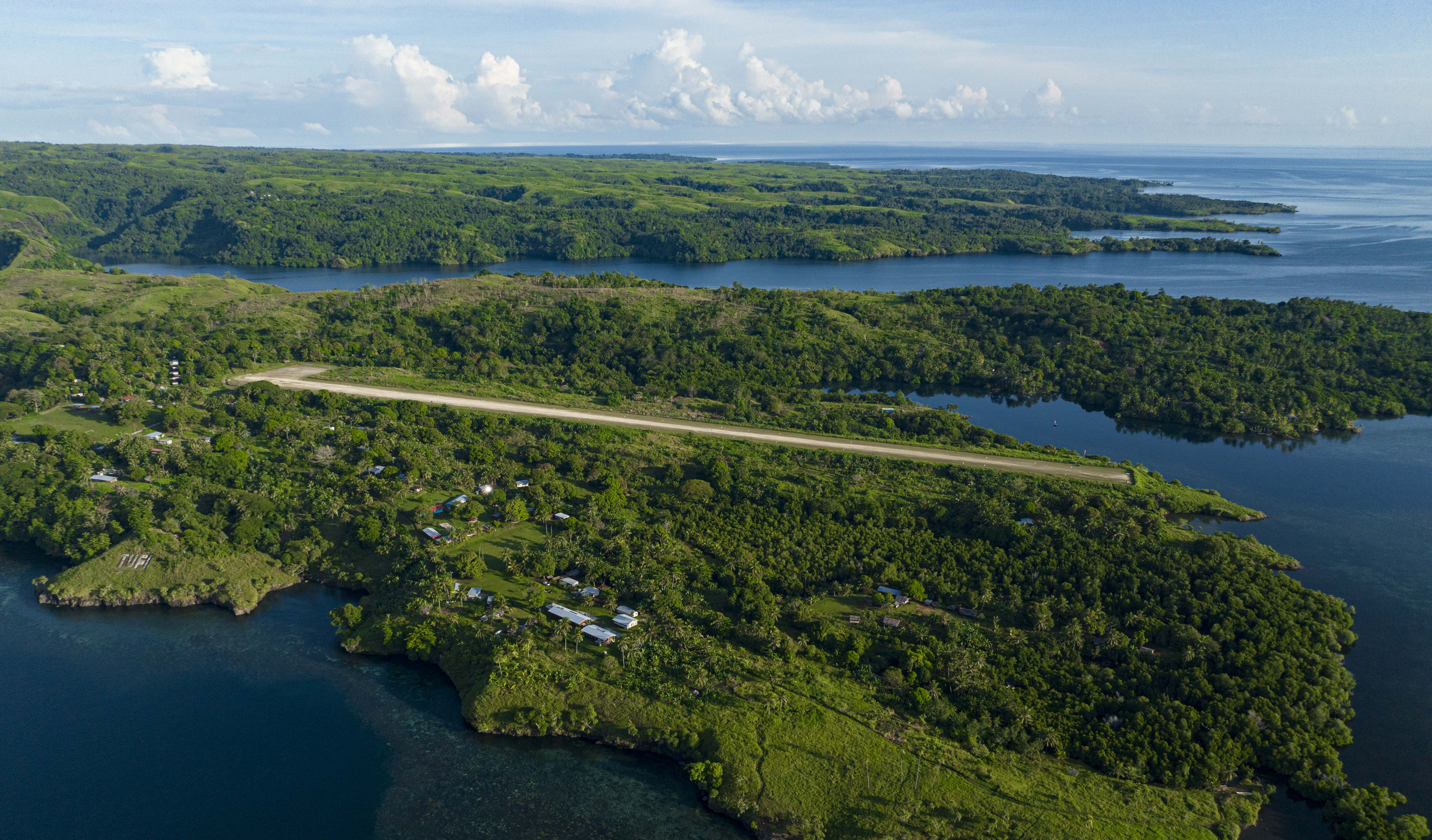
- Tufi Airstrip, looking North.
- IATA: TFI; ICAO: AYTU

Summary
- Serves: Tufi, Papua New Guinea
- Location: Tufi, Papua New Guinea
- Elevation AMSL: 125 ft (38 m)
- Coordinates: 09°04′33″S 149°19′12″E

Map
- Location of airport in Papua New Guinea

Runways
Direction	Length		Surface
Direction	ft	m	Surface
239	3,018	920	Unpaved
- Uncontrolled aerodrome. No tower or operations center, no lighting, no ILS, no refueling. Day VFR only.

Tufi Airport is an airport in Tufi, Papua New Guinea built in the 1960s by the Australian Army. It consists of a single 920 by 30 meters (3,018 ft × 98 ft) unpaved runway along a 059-239 degree axis. There is no control tower and refueling is not available. Air Niugini flights are typically scheduled on Monday (POM-PNP-TFI-POM) and Friday (POM-TFI-PNP-POM). Tropic Air also schedules irregular cargo and passenger charter flights.

== Airlines and destinations ==
Tufi Airport is connected to Girua Airport (Popondetta) and Rabaul Airport by PNG Air, and to Port Moresby International Airport by Air Niugini.
