= Lihir Island Airport =

Airport in New Ireland, Papua New Guinea

Lihir Island Regional Airport
- IATA: LNV; ICAO: AYKY

Summary
- Airport type: Public
- Elevation AMSL: 3 m (9.8 ft)
- Coordinates: 03°02′32.64″S 152°37′40.44″E

Map
- Location of airport in Papua New Guinea

Lihir Island Airport is an airport in Londolovit on Lihir Island in Papua New Guinea. The airport has a short unpaved runway long enough to handle a small jet. All flights leave at approximately 4-7am.

The airport has significantly upgraded its facilities, which now includes air conditioning, x-ray machines and a renovated waiting area. It is assumed that this is because of the introduction of a new international flight to Cairns, Australia, operated by PNG Air.

== Airlines and destinations ==
Airlines	Destinations
Air Niugini	Port Moresby, Rabaul
Hevilift	Charter: Cairns
PNG Air	Kavieng, Port Moresby, Rabaul; Charter: Cairns
