= PNG Air =

Airline in Papua New Guinea

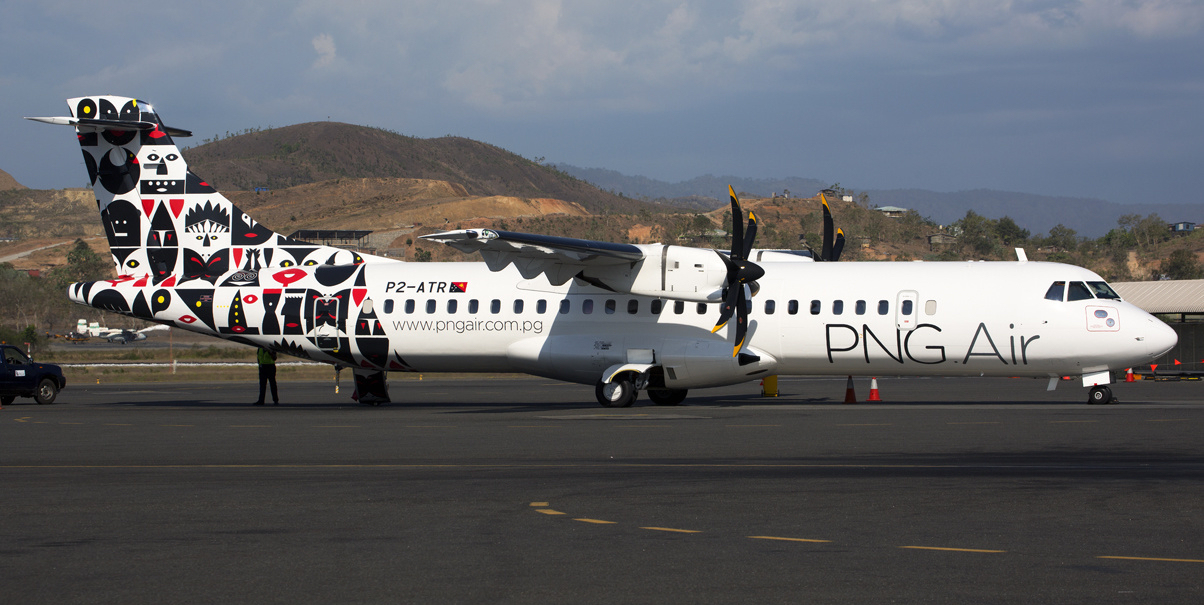
- PNG Air ATR 72
IATA	ICAO	Call sign
CG	TOK	BALUS
- Founded: 30 June 1987; 39 years ago (As Milne Bay Air)
- Hubs: Jacksons International Airport
- Fleet size: 12
- Destinations: 23
- Headquarters: Jacksons International Airport; Port Moresby, Papua New Guinea
- Key people: Augustine Mano (Chairman); Stanley Stevens (Acting Chief Executive Officer)
- Website: www.pngair.com.pg

PNG Air, formerly Airlines PNG, is an airline based on the grounds of Jacksons International Airport, Port Moresby, Papua New Guinea. It operates scheduled domestic and international flights, as well as contract corporate charter work. Its main base is Jacksons International Airport. Today its IATA code TOK is used by Toki Air.

== History ==
The airline was originally established and started operations on 30 June 1987 as Milne Bay Air. It operated as a charter company in the resource development industry. The airline obtained an RPT (scheduled passenger services) licence in September 1992 and received its airline licence in March 1997. With its headquarters and main operating base set in Port Moresby, there are also support staff in Cairns, Australia. PNG Air has 750 staff. In 2008 the airline was listed on the Port Moresby Stock Exchange.

In November 2015, the airline rebranded and unveiled a new livery. It also received its first ATR 72-600 aircraft, to become the backbone of the fleet by 2020.

== Destinations ==
PNG Air operates scheduled passenger flights to the following destinations:

Papua New Guinea

- Alotau – Gurney Airport
- Buka – Buka Airport
- Daru – Daru Airport
- Goroka – Goroka Airport
- Hoskins – Hoskins Airport
- Kiunga – Kiunga Airport
- Aropa – Kieta Airport
- Kavieng – Kavieng Airport
- Lae – Lae Airport
- Lihir Island – Lihir Island Airport
- Losuia – Losuia Airport
- Madang – Madang Airport
- Misima – Misima Airport
- Moro – Moro Airport
- Mount Hagen – Mount Hagen Airport
- Popondetta – Girua Airport
- Port Moresby – Port Moresby International Airport hub
- Rabaul / Kokopo – Rabaul Airport
- Tabubil – Tabubil Airport
- Tari – Tari Airport
- Vanimo – Vanimo Airport
- Wewak – Wewak Airport
- Wapenamanda – Wapenamanda Airport

Australia

- Cairns – Cairns Airport

== Future Destinations ==
- Kepulauan Aru – Benjina Airport

== Fleet ==
As of October 2025, PNG Air operates the following aircraft:

PNG Air fleet
Aircraft	In service	Orders	Passengers	Notes
ATR 72-600	7	—	72	
Bombardier Dash 8-100	4	—	36	
Cargo fleet
Bombardier Dash 8-100	1	—	Cargo	
Total	12	—		

== Incidents and accidents ==
- On 15 December 1992, a Milne Bay Air Britten-Norman Islander aircraft struck a mountain near Alotau, Papua New Guinea. Six people were killed.
- On 12 July 1995, a Milne Bay Air de Havilland Canada DHC-6 Twin Otter aircraft exploded and crashed into shallow water shortly after takeoff from Dagura Airport. Thirteen people were killed.
- On 11 May 1996, a Milne Bay Air Britten-Norman Islander flew into a valley surrounded by high terrain near Oumba. Pilot attempted a 180 degree turn, but crashed into trees. One passenger was killed.
- On 9 July 1996, a Milne Bay Air Twin Otter aircraft struck a mountain in cloudy conditions on approach to Mendi. Twenty people were killed.
- On 29 July 2004, an Airlines PNG Twin Otter crashed near Ononge, in cloudy conditions, killing two people.
- On 11 August 2009, Airlines PNG Flight 4684, a Twin Otter, made a failed go-around in cloudy conditions near Kokoda. The aircraft crashed into a mountain at an altitude of 5500 feet (1676 metres). All 13 people on board were killed.
- On 13 October 2011, a Dash 8-100, registration P2-MCJ, operating Airlines PNG Flight 1600 from Lae to Madang crashed 20 km south of Madang and caught fire, killing 28 of the 32 people on board.
