= MXH =

MXH or mxh may refer to:

- MXH, the IATA code for Moro Airport, Papua New Guinea
- mxh, the ISO 639-3 code for Mvuba language
