= Daru Airport =

Airport in Daru, Papua New Guinea

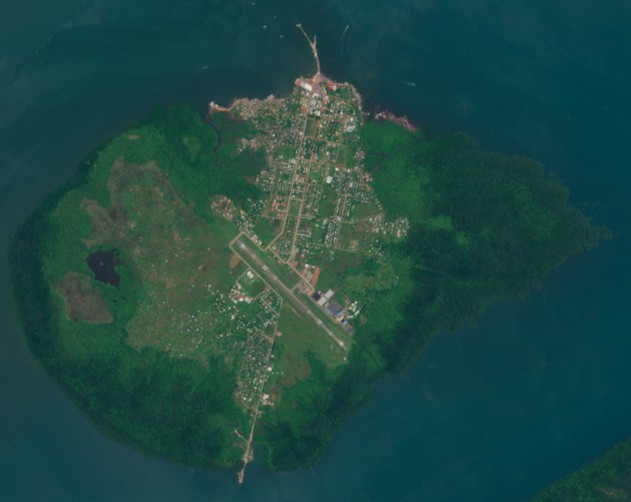
- IATA: DAU; ICAO: AYDU

Summary
- Airport type: Public
- Operator: Government
- Serves: Daru, Western Province, Papua New Guinea
- Elevation AMSL: 6 m (20 ft)
- Coordinates: 09°05′12″S 143°12′28″E

Map
- Location of the airport in Papua New Guinea

Runways
| Direction | Length | | Surface |
| Direction | m | ft | Surface |
|---|---|---|---|
| 14/32 | 1,400 | 4,593 | Asphalt |
- Source: WAD, GCM, STV

Daru Airport (IATA: DAU, ICAO: AYDU) is an airport serving Daru, the capital of the Western Province in Papua New Guinea.

The airfield was constructed before or during World War II. During the war it was used as a refuelling stop by Allied fighter aircraft. The Australian Army rebuilt the airport in 1965. Domestically, airport is served by PNG Air and Air Niugini with access to destinations including the national capital, Port Moresby. Internationally, Torres Strait Air operates flights to Horn Island, the primary airport serving in the Torres Strait Islands of Queensland, Australia.

== Airlines and destinations ==
| Airlines | Destinations |
|---|---|
| Air Niugini | Port Moresby |
| PNG Air | Balimo, Kiunga, Port Moresby, |
| Torres Strait Air | Charter: Horn Island |
