= Moro Airport =

Airport in Moro, Southern Highlands, Papua New Guinea

- IATA: MXH; ICAO: AYMR

Summary
- Location: Papua New Guinea
- Elevation AMSL: 2,741 ft (835 m)
- Coordinates: 06°21′48″S 143°14′17″E

Map
- Location in Papua New Guinea

Runways
Direction	Length		Surface
Direction	m	ft	Surface
09/27	1,820	5,971
- Source: PNG Airstrip Guide

Moro Airport is an airfield in the Southern Highlands Province of Papua New Guinea. Located near Lake Kutubu, it serves ExxonMobil's Moro oil and gas operations. The runway is unsealed, and aviation activities typically occur only during daylight hours.

== Airlines and destinations ==
Moro Airport is connected to Mount Hagen Airport and Port Moresby International Airport by PNG Air, and to Cairns Airport by Air Niugini.
