= Bialla =

Bialla may refer to:

- Biała Piska, a town in Poland
- Bialla, Papua New Guinea, a Papua New Guinean town where Airlink operates
- Bialla Rural LLG, a local-level government area of Papua New Guinea

== See also ==
- Biała (disambiguation)
