= Lae Nadzab Airport =

Domestic airport in Nadzab, Morobe Province, Papua New Guinea

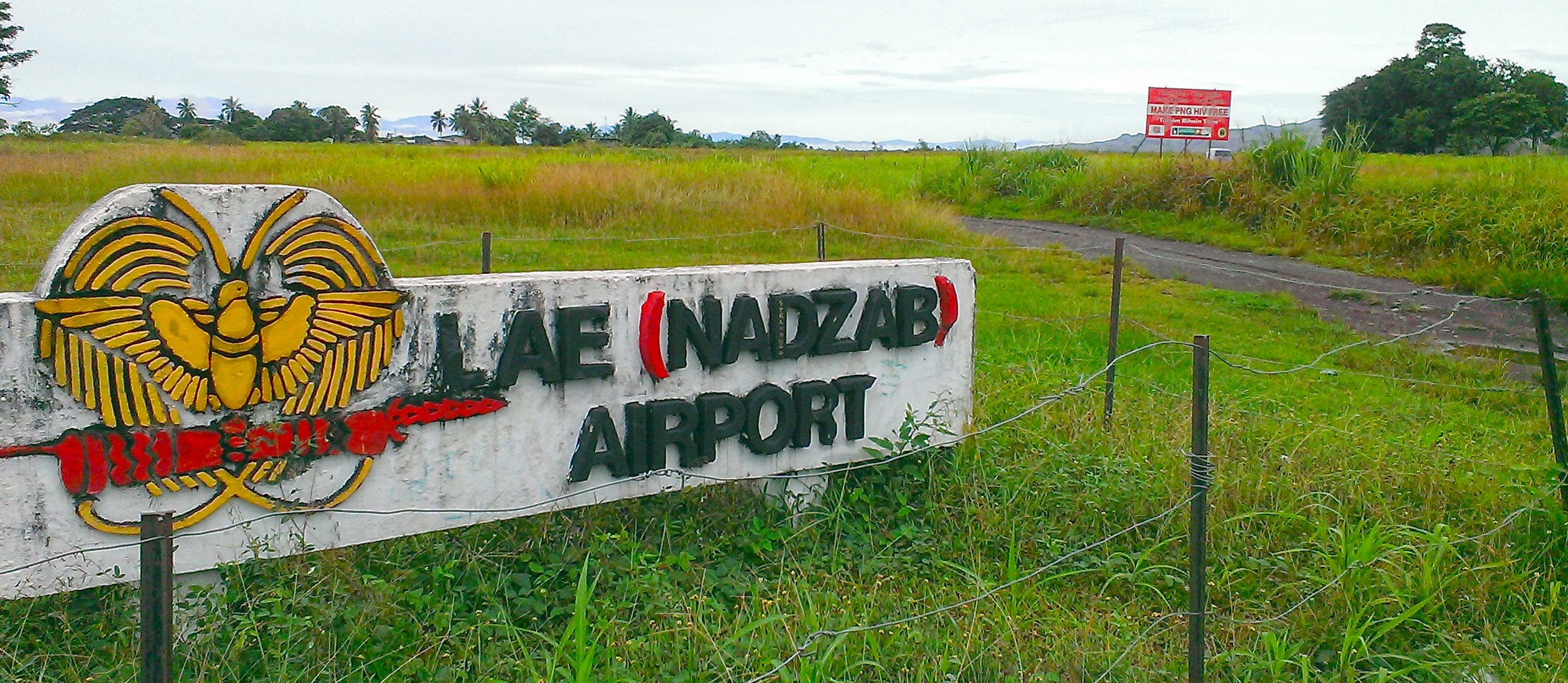
- IATA: LAE; ICAO: AYNZ

Summary
- Airport type: Public
- Elevation AMSL: 238 ft (73 m)
- Coordinates: 6°34′11″S 146°43′34″E

Map
- Location within Papua New Guinea Location within Pacific Ocean

Runways
Direction	Length		Surface
Direction	ft	m	Surface
09/27	8,004	2,439	Asphalt

Nadzab Airport, officially named Nadzab Tomodachi International Airport, is a regional airport located at Nadzab 42 kilometres (26 mi) outside Lae, Morobe Province, Papua New Guinea along the Highlands Highway. It is served by both private and regional aircraft with domestic flights. The airport replaced the Lae Airfield in 1977.

Nadzab is located on the Erap River, 5 kilometres (3.1 mi) North of the Markham River. The settlements of Gabmatsung/Gabmatzung and Gabsonkek are located on the East side of the airport.

== History ==
In about 1910 the Gabmatsung/Gabmazung Lutheran mission station was established at Nadzab. and established an airfield for use by small planes until the outbreak of the Pacific War when it became overgrown with dense kunai grass.

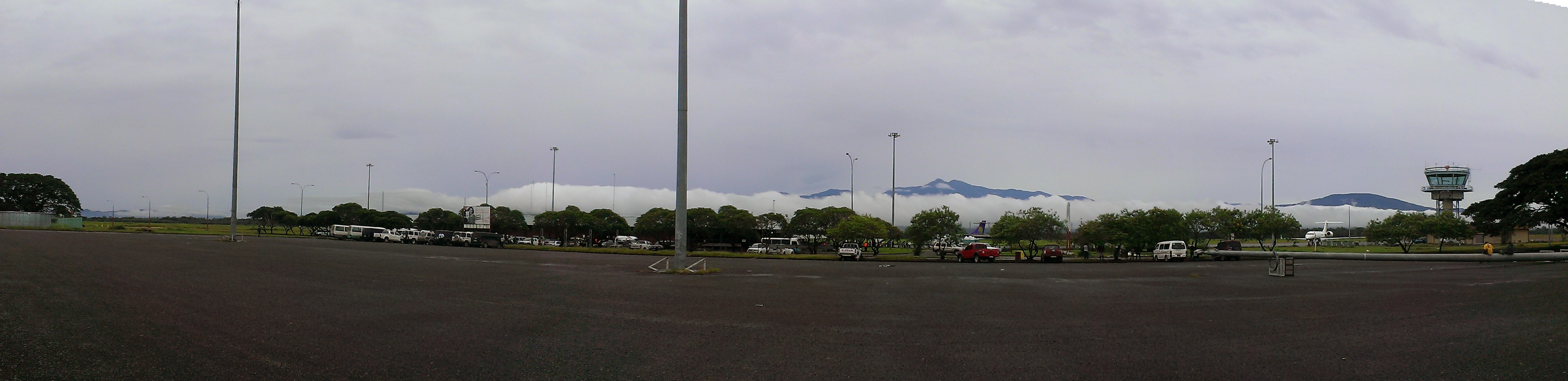
Panoramic photo of Nadzab airport in Lae, Papua New Guinea

=== World War II ===
In March 1942, the Japanese occupied Lae and Salamaua.

Between April 1943 and July 1943, the Allied Geographical Section of South West Pacific Area (command) conducted reconnaissance after the Japanese invasion. The Terrain Handbook states at page 18:

Nazdab is located twenty-seven miles NW of Lae by road 900 yds by an indefinite width. Covered with kunai grass. Good dispersal area. Emergency landing ground for heavy freight planes. Extension to 2000 yds thought possible.''

The first parachute jump for the 503rd Parachute Regiment was during the Allied paratrooper assault on 5 September 1943. In conjunction with the Amphibious Landing East of Malahang, was to be the start of the liberation of Lae from Japanese Occupation.

After Lae was liberated, the United States Army and the Royal Australian Air Force built Nadzab airport and developed it into a massive airbase complex. It was home to many United States Army Air Forces and Royal Australian Air Force units during the war when it was a forward base of operations against Japanese positions, and was vital afterwards as a staging area.

Two parallel runways were built, running roughly east to west. Number 1 Strip was located to the north. Parallel and to the south was Number 2 Strip, closest to the Markham River. Towards the end of the war, the 21st Air Depot Unit at Nadzab began to manage a storage and reclamation area for excess Allied aircraft and salvage area for repairs. The CRTC (Combat Replacement Training Center) flew out of the base into 1945 until it was turned over to the New Guinea government.

=== Post War ===
In 1962, the main strip at Nadzab was resealed by the Australian Commonwealth Department of Works and lengthened to make it suitable for Mirage fighters, even though they never materialised. However, it was always maintained by the Australian Department of Civil Aviation as an alternative to Lae in poor weather conditions.

Today, the former 'East Base' or No. 1 & No. 2 runways are still in use by Air Niugini and for civil aviation, mainly servicing Lae which is 45 kilometres (28 mi) away. Roads in the area were built by American forces.

Nadzab airport was redeveloped by Australia in the early to mid 1970s as part of an independence gift from Australia to PNG which became independent in September 1975. The Australian Department of Housing & Construction, and Department of Civil Aviation (DCA) undertook the work. Specialised airport lighting was installed by DCA engineers Byron Sullivan and Frank Martinelli.

The airport in Lae was operating at the same time as Nadzab but business was significantly lost when the new airport complex became fully operational in 1977. Fierce political squabbling over the pros and cons of Lae and Nadzab continued until 1982, when, in an unsolved mystery, the Lae airport terminal was burned down.

Lae airfield continued to be used by Air Niugini and other third-level airlines until 1987. It was also used as the base for the Papua New Guinea Defence Force until it was transferred to Port Moresby in 1992.

It was symbolically renamed in 2023 after Japanese investment and redevelopment.

== Airlines and destinations ==
Airlines	Destinations
Air Niugini	Buka, Hoskins, Lorengau, Port Moresby
North Coast Aviation	Bulolo, Finschhafen, Kabwum, Lablab, Omora, Satwag Wau, Yalumet
PNG Air	Alotau, Goroka, Hoskins, Madang, Popondetta, Port Moresby, Rabaul

== Allied units assigned to Nadzab ==
- Headquarters, Fifth Air Force (15 June – 10 August 1944)
- Headquarters, V Bomber Command (21 February – 15 August 1944)
- Headquarters, V Fighter Command (January–July 1944)
- 91st Reconnaissance Wing (30 March – 10 August 1944)
- 54th Troop Carrier Wing (18 April – 5 October 1944)
- 3d Bombardment Group (3 February – 12 May 1944)

Headquarters, 89th, 90th Bomb Squadrons, Douglas A-20 Havoc

- 22d Bombardment Group (13 January – 11 August 1944)

Headquarters, 2d, 19th, 33d, 408th Bomb Squadrons, Martin B-26 Marauder, B-25 Mitchell

- 38th Bombardment Group (4 March – 1 October 1944)

Headquarters, 71st, 405th, 822d, 823d Bomb Squadrons, North American B-25 Mitchell

- 43d Bombardment Group (4 March – 2 July 1944)

Headquarters, 64th, 65th, 403d Bomb Squadrons, Consolidated B-24 Liberator

- 90th Bombardment Group (23 February – 10 August 1944)

Headquarters, 319th, 320th, 321st, 400th Bomb Squadrons, B-24 Liberator

- 345th Bombardment Group (16 February – July 1944)

Headquarters, 499th Bomb Squadron

- 8th Fighter Group (14 March – 17 June 1944)

Headquarters, 6th, 35th, 36th Fighter Squadrons, Republic P-47 Thunderbolt, some Curtiss P-40 Warhawks

- 35th Fighter Group (5 October 1943 – 7 February 1944)

Headquarters, 39th FS, P-47 Thunderbolt, 41st FS, Bell P-39 Airacobra, P-47 Thunderbolt

- 475th Fighter Group (24 March – 15 May 1944)
- 6th Reconnaissance Group (17 February – August 1944)

Headquarters, 8th, 20th, 25th, Recon/Photo Squadrons (F-7, F-5)

- 71st Reconnaissance Group (20 January – 8 August 1944)
- 374 Troop Carrier Group (1 September – 14 October 1944)

Headquarters, 6th, 21st Troop Carrier Squadrons, Douglas C-47 Skytrain

- 375th Troop Carrier Group (1 September – 14 October 1944)
- 433d Troop Carrier Group (25 August 1943 – 17 October 1944)

Headquarters, 65th, 66th, 67th, 68th, 70th Troop Carrier Squadrons, C-47 Skytrain

- 421st Night Fighter Squadron (27 January – 28 June 1944)

Key RAAF Units at Nadzab:

- No. 77 Wing: This wing was a key element of No. 10 Operational Group (later the Australian First Tactical Air Force) and began operations from Nadzab in early 1944.
- Initially, it comprised squadrons flying Vultee Vengeance dive bombers.
- These were replaced by squadrons flying Douglas Bostons, DAP Bristol Beaufighters, and DAP Bristol Beauforts.
- No. 4 (Army Cooperation) Squadron: In early 1944, this squadron was based at Nadzab and was photographed with a CAC Boomerang fighter, serial No. 7-OE.
- RAAF Mobile Works Units: These units, such as No. 62 Mobile Works Squadron, were instrumental in the airfield's development. They worked day and night, loading gravel for surfacing and using bulldozers to clear jungle to expand and maintain the airfields.
- Allied Intelligence Bureau (Ferdinand (Note: see Edward John Hunt and Repatriation Commission [1992] AATA 85, Administrative Appeals Tribunal (Australia)))

== Accidents and incidents ==
- On 18 November 1987, Douglas C-47B Skytrain P2-006 of the Papua New Guinea Defence Force was damaged beyond repair in an emergency landing shortly after take-off. An engine had lost power and a wing was ripped off in the subsequent belly landing.

== See also ==
- United States Army Air Forces in the South West Pacific Theatre
- War Memorial collection
