= Tabubil Airport =

Airport in Tabubil, Papua New Guinea

- IATA: TBG; ICAO: AYTB

Summary
- Location: Tabubil, Papua New Guinea
- Elevation AMSL: 1,500 ft (460 m)
- Coordinates: 5°16′43″S 141°13′33″E

Map
- Location of airport in Papua New Guinea

Runways
Direction	Length		Surface
Direction	m	ft	Surface
14/32		4,500

Tabubil Airport (IATA: TBG, ICAO: AYTB) is an international airport in Tabubil, Papua New Guinea. Asia Pacific Airlines operates out of Tabubil as its hub.

== History ==
In the late 1970s, Tabubil was a small camp. Before construction of the town, Tabubil's first airstrip was in a different location, and a different angle to the airstrip that exists today. Air travel was instrumental in the development of the town, as there were no roads and the Kiunga-Tabubil Highway, which was a major logistical problem, was not constructed yet.

== Airlines and destinations ==
Asia Pacific Airlines is a local company with head offices in Tabubil, and Airlines PNG, Mission Aviation Fellowship and Air Niugini also fly to Tabubil Regularly.

Airlines	Destinations
Air Niugini	Port Moresby
Asia Pacific Airlines	Charter: Cairns, Mount Hagen, Port Moresby
PNG Air	Kiunga, Mount Hagen, Port Moresby

== Aircraft safety ==
Tabubil has a history of poor aircraft safety, and many fatal crashes have occurred in the nearby mountains. Additionally, due to weather conditions, many aircraft have had to be diverted to Kiunga and passengers transported by road or helicopter for the remainder of the journey. Some of the most publicised crashes are as follows:

20 November 1969

A Britten-Norman Islander with registration number VH-ATK operated by Aerial Tours crashed at Bolovip, around 50km east of Tabubil. Fatality rates are unknown, but the plane was unrepairable.

12 July 1983

A Britten-Norman Islander operated by Cloudlands Aviation Development with registration P2-FHP was destroyed in an unknown location and route. It is known the plane was written off, and was probably en route to or from Tabubil, as CAD existed purely to serve Tabubil before its purchase by Talair.

9 June 1993

A Britten-Norman Islander operated by Southwest Air with registration P2-SWA crashed killing 9 of its 11 occupants in Gulgubip, 30km east of Tabubil. The aircraft disintegrated on its final approach after a wing came in contact with the ground.

22 November 1994

A Britten-Norman Islander operated by Southwest Air with registration P2-SWC crashed into a mountain killing all 7 of its occupants in remote jungle, 54km ESE of Tabubil. Poor weather was cited as the cause of the crash.

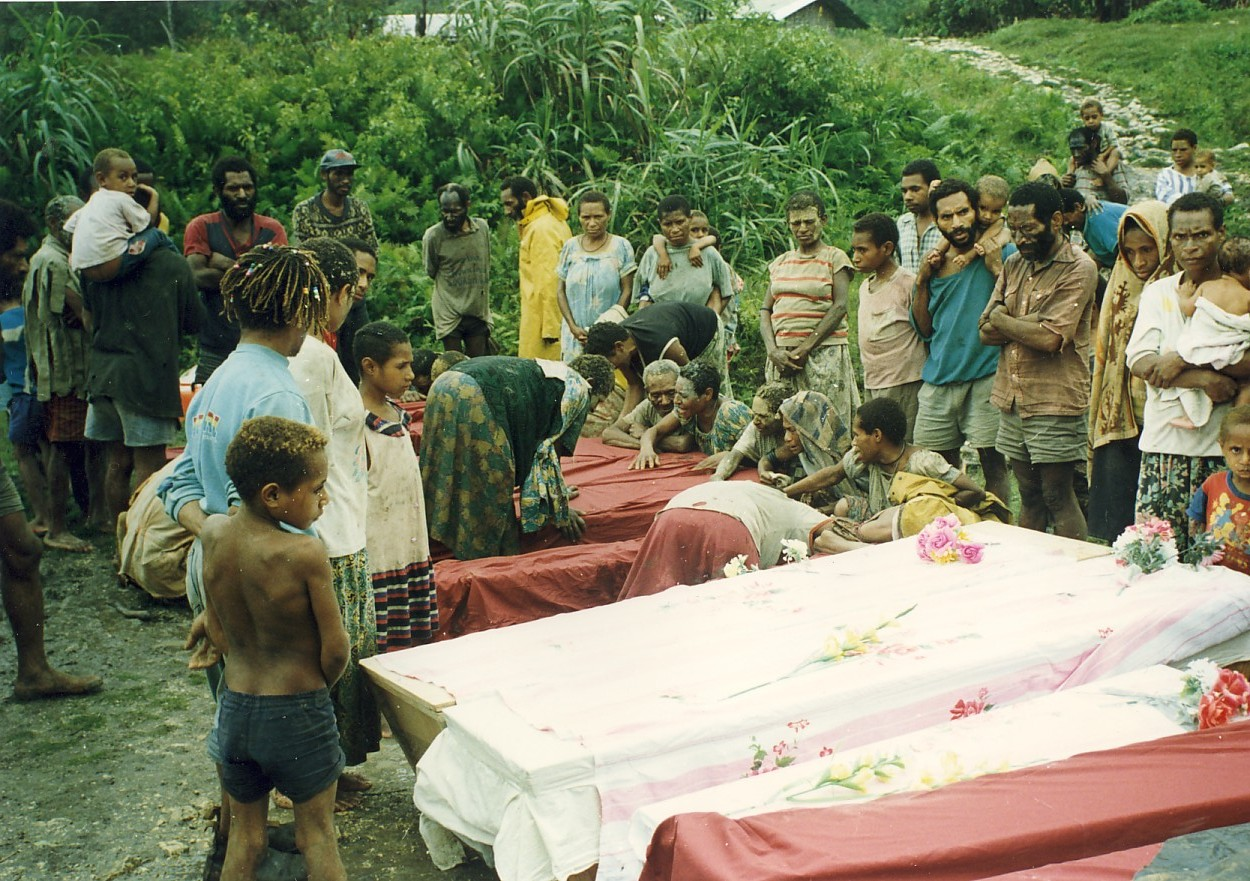
Mourners at Selbang grieve over coffins of the dead in the December 1994 crash.

17 December 1994

A de Havilland Twin Otter 200 with registration P2-MFS, operated by the Mission Aviation Fellowship crashed while en route from Tabubil to the nearby village of Selbang. 28 people were killed, including both the crew and all passengers. The aircraft struck a mountain due to poor visibility and lack of functioning instruments at 6400ft.

1 July 1995

A de Havilland Caribou operated by Vanimo Trading with registration P2-VTC crashed en route to Tabubil from Port Moresby. The plane attempted to land in bad weather at Tabubil, but had to abort due to an engine failure. The pilot decided to divert to Kiunga, but on approach to Kiunga Airport the other engine failed. One of the two crew and the only passenger on board the cargo plane perished.

22 February 2005

A de Havilland Twin Otter 300 with registration P2-MFQ, operated by the Mission Aviation Fellowship crashed en route from Tabubil to Bimin. In a scene reminiscent of the similar 1994 crash, the plane hit a mountain whilst trying to detect the village runway. The two captains, Chris Hansen, 37, and Richard West, 40 (both from New Zealand), were killed in the accident but the cabin attendant and 8 passengers survived and were able to walk to the village.

19 November 2007

A TropicAir flight from Port Moresby bound for Tabubil was hijacked. The flight contained the K2 million payroll for the Ok Tedi mine. The hijackers were employed by the bank to provide security for the money, and forced the pilots to land on Fishermans Airfield. The pilots set off a silent SOS alarm, which allowed police to close in on the plane. There was a gunfight in which one police reservist died, but the crew were unhurt, and the money recovered.
