= No. 15 Squadron RAAF =

Royal Australian Air Force squadron

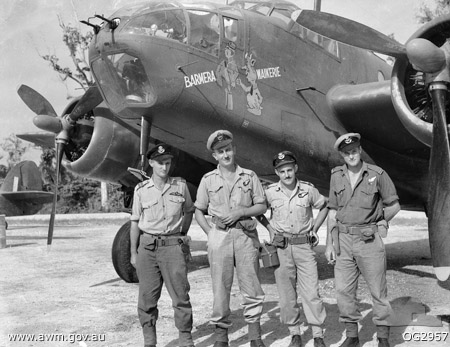
- The crew of a No. 15 Squadron Beaufort with their aircraft in 1945
- Active: 1944–1946
- Country: Australia
- Branch: Royal Australian Air Force
- Role: Maritime patrol and bomber

Aircraft flown
- Bomber: Bristol Beaufort

No. 15 Squadron was a Royal Australian Air Force (RAAF) light bomber and maritime patrol squadron of World War II. The squadron was formed in January 1944 and initially flew anti-submarine patrols off the east coast of Australia. From September that year elements of the squadron took part in the New Guinea Campaign, and the main body of the squadron moved to New Guinea in March 1945. Its duties in New Guinea included anti-submarine and anti-barge patrols as well as attacking Japanese positions. No. 15 Squadron was demobilised after the end of the war, and was formally disbanded in March 1946.

== History ==
No. 15 Squadron was formed at Camden, New South Wales, on 27 January 1944. The squadron was issued with 19 Bristol Beaufort light bombers and 380 air and ground crew, and had the roles of conducting anti-submarine patrols off the full length of the Australian east coast as well as supporting Australian Army and Royal Australian Navy operations and conducting photo reconnaissance. The unit's headquarters moved to nearby Menangle, New South Wales in late February, but returned to Camden in May.

In July 1944, No. 15 Squadron began preparations to deploy to New Guinea. An advance party departed on 21 July, but elements of the squadron remained in Australia where they continued to undertake anti-submarine patrols until the end of the war. On 25 December 1944 No. 15 Squadron Beauforts located the damaged liberty ship Robert S. Walker and her surviving crew shortly after the ship was torpedoed by the German submarine U-862 off Moruya. The liberty ship subsequently sank.

No. 15 Squadron gradually moved to New Guinea between September 1944 and March 1945, and its headquarters was relocated to Madang Airfield at Madang on 20 March 1945. A detachment was established at Middleburg Airfield off the north-west tip of New Guinea shortly afterwards. The squadron's roles in New Guinea were to conduct anti-submarine and anti-barge patrols and attack Japanese ground positions. It also conducted photo reconnaissance sorties, and carried mail and other supplies. As at late April 1945, No. 15 Squadron's headquarters was located at Madang and it had operational detachments at Middleburg, Cairns and Townsville and a rear echelon at Camden.

From 4 to 11 May 1945, a detachment of eight No. 15 Squadron aircraft was assigned to No. 71 Wing and supported the Australian Army forces engaged in the Aitape–Wewak campaign alongside other Beaufort-equipped RAAF squadrons. These aircraft operated from Tadji Airfield at Aitape. The aircraft bombed Japanese positions throughout the region, and mounted an intensive effort on 11 May to support the landing at Dove Bay. No. 71 Wing's operations were successful, though they were hampered by a continual shortage of bombs. From June many of the squadron's operations from Madang were conducted in conjunction with the P-40 Kittyhawk-equipped No. 120 (Netherlands East Indies) Squadron.

Following the end of the war on 15 August 1945, No. 15 Squadron dropped leaflets on Japanese positions. The unit also undertook transport and courier flights. The squadron received orders to return to Australia on 22 September, and its air echelon departed Middleburg Island late in the month. The sea echelon sailed on 2 October and No. 15 Squadron's headquarters arrived at Kingaroy in Queensland on 5 October. The squadron began the demobilisation process as soon as it was established at Kingaroy, and was formally disbanded there on 23 March 1946. No. 15 Squadron suffered 15 fatalities during its existence.
