= Madang Airport =

Airport in Madang, Papua New Guinea

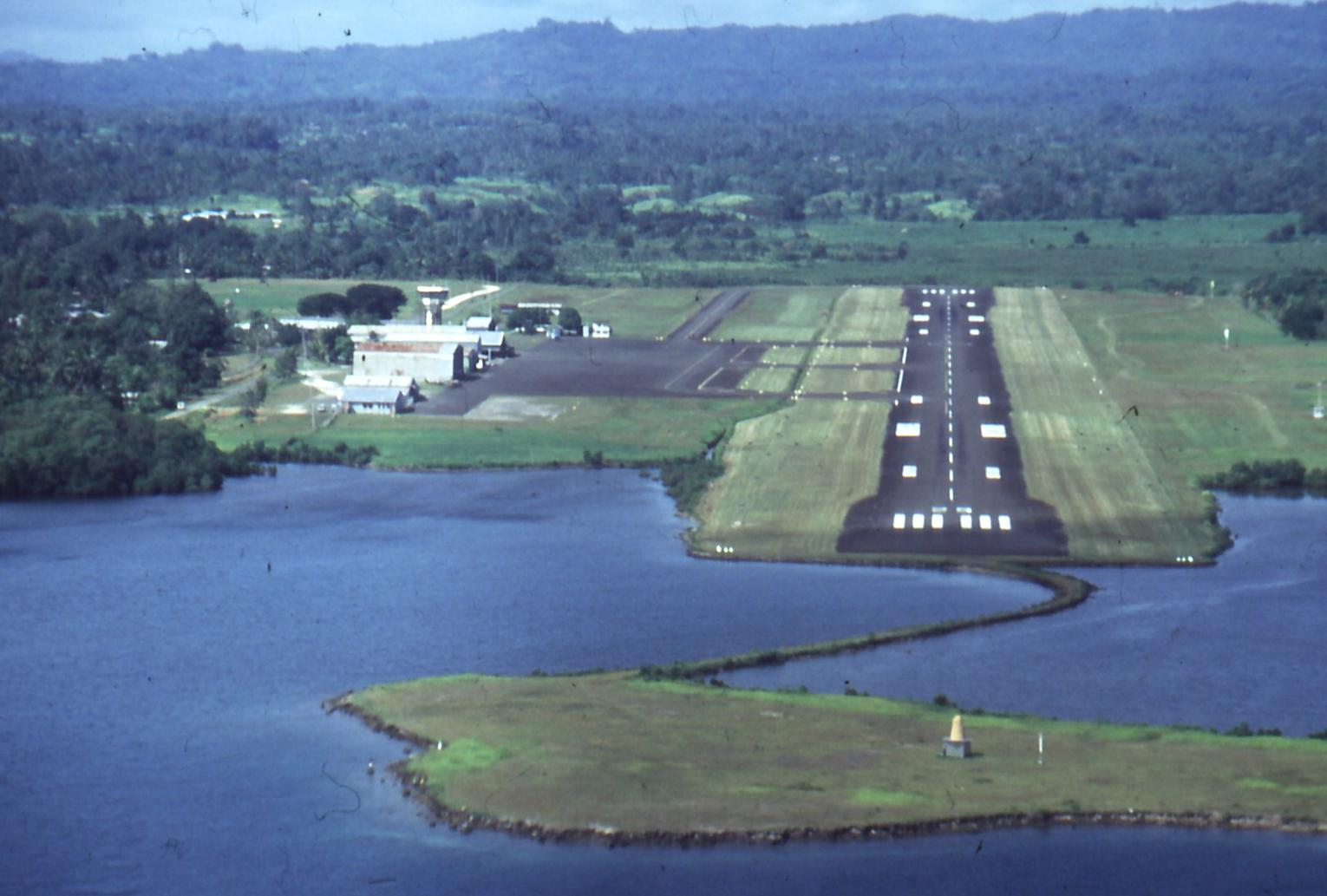
- IATA: MAG; ICAO: AYMD; WMO: 94014

Summary
- Airport type: Public
- Operator: Papua New Guinea Office of Civil Aviation
- Location: Madang
- Elevation AMSL: 18 ft (5.5 m)
- Coordinates: 05°12′30″S 145°47′00″E

Map
- Location of Madang Airport

Runways
Direction	Length		Surface
Direction	ft	m	Surface
07/25	5,174	1,577	Asphalt
- Source: World Aero Data

Madang Airport (IATA: MAG, ICAO: AYMD), is an airport located in Madang, Papua New Guinea.

== Airlines and destinations ==
Madang Airport is connected to Momote Airport (Lorengau), Port Moresby International Airport, Vanimo Airport, and Wewak Airport by Air Niugini, and to Lae Nadzab Airport by PNG Air.

== History ==
=== World War II ===
During World War II, it was occupied by the Imperial Japanese Army in January 1943 as a forward operating airfield for aircraft based at Wewak, and later expanded to a 3,250 ft × 240 ft (991 m × 73 m) runway with a single taxiway with 31 revetment areas. Bombed by the allies during late 1943 and early 1944, the airfield became unserviceable.

==== Imperial Japanese Army Air Force Units at Madang ====
Imperial Japanese Army Air Force

- 59th Sentai (Nakajima Ki-43 Oscar)
- 68th Sentai (Kawasaki Ki-61 Tony)
- 248th Sentai (Nakajima Ki-43-III Oscar)

=== Allied Liberation ===
The airport was liberated by Australian Army forces on 24 April 1944. A large amount of high octane fuel was captured and used by the Australians for use in the Royal Australian Navy motor launch boats. The airfield was repaired and used by the Royal Australian Air Force until the end of the war.

Post WW2 in 1947, the Department of Civil Aviation sent an airport manager to Madang to oversee the building of the airport. Accommodation for the workers also had to be built as well as airplane hangars and a control tower. Wooden floors on concrete slabs were laid. Knitted woven bark for the walls was floated downstream, made by the natives, who were paid in cash. When the bark hut accommodation was ready, motor mechanics, radio technicians and other workers arrived along with wives and children. Eventually packaged Hawksley houses arrived from Britain and were built in the township of Madang.

==== Royal Australian Air Force Units at Madang ====
- Headquarters, RAAF Northern Command (NORCOM)
- No. 4 Squadron RAAF (CAC Boomerang)
- No. 8 Communication Unit RAAF
- No. 15 Squadron RAAF (Bristol Beaufort)
- No. 111 Air-Sea Rescue Flight RAAF (PBY Catalina)
- No. 120 (Netherlands East Indies) Squadron RAAF
- No. 2 Medical Receiving Station RAAF
- No. 109 Mobile Fighter Sector Headquarters RAAF

=== International flights ===
In 1970s, Air Niugini operated an international flight to Jayapura (via Wewak), using Douglas DC-3 and Fokker F28 aircraft and it operated until 1980s.

In 2018, it was announced that the airport will operate a direct international flight to Jayapura.

== Accidents and incidents ==
- On 11 April 1972, Douglas C-47 VH-PNB of Trans Australia Airlines overran the runway on landing, ending up in the sea damaged beyond economic repair.
- On 17 July 1972, Douglas C-47A VH-MAE of Ansett Airlines of Papua New Guinea was damaged beyond economic repair when the starboard undercarriage collapsed on landing. The aircraft was operating a domestic cargo flight from Wapenamanda Airport.
- On 30 October 1972, Douglas C-47B VH-PNA of Ansett Airlines of Papua New Guinea overran the runway on landing. The aircraft was subsequently withdrawn from use and used for fire practice, eventually being scrapped in 1978.
- On 31 May 1995 an Air Niugini Fokker F-28 Fellowship 1000, registration P2-ANB, attempted a landing in bad weather and aquaplaned off the runway and fell into a ditch at the eastern end of the runway. The aircraft was carrying 4 crew and 35 passengers, none of whom was injured.
- On 19 October 2013 an Air Niugini Avions de Transport Regional ATR-42-300 cargo plane, registration P2-PXY, made a failed takeoff attempt and fell into Mero Creek at the western end of the runway. The right wing and engine were destroyed by fire but the three crew escaped to safety with minor injuries. There were no passengers on board.

== See also ==
- Naval Base Alexishafen
