= Telefomin Airport =

- IATA: TFM; ICAO: AYTE

Summary
- Location: Telefomin, Papua New Guinea
- Coordinates: 5°7′33.6″S 141°38′30″E

Map
- Location of airport in Papua New Guinea

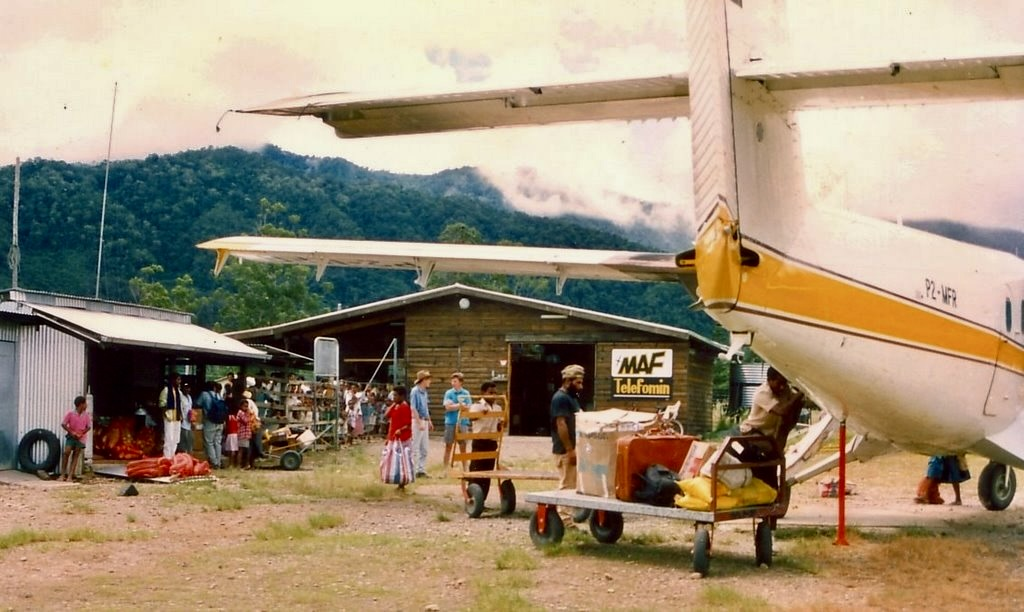

Telefomin Airport is an airport in Telefomin, Papua New Guinea. It was constructed during World War II and is the means of transportation in and out of Telefomin.

== Airlines and destinations ==
Mission Aviation Fellowship connects Telefomin Airport to Mount Hagen Airport.
