= Wewak Airport =

Airport in Papua New Guinea

- IATA: WWK; ICAO: AYWK; WMO: 94004

Summary
- Location: Wewak, Papua New Guinea
- Elevation AMSL: 15 ft (4.6 m)
- Coordinates: 03°35′01.78″S 143°40′09.07″E

Map
- Location within Papua New Guinea

Runways
Direction	Length		Surface
Direction	ft	m	Surface
10/28	5,234	1,595	Asphalt
- Source: World Aero Data

Wewak Airport (IATA: WWK, ICAO: AYWK), also known as Boram Airport or Wewak International Airport, is an airport in Wewak, Papua New Guinea.

The airport previously served international flights when Air Niugini ran a flight to Jayapura until June 1996.

== Airlines and destinations ==
Wewak Airport is connected to Mount Hagen Airport by PNG Air and Air Niugini, and to Madang Airport, Vanimo Airport, and Port Moresby International Airport by Air Niugini.
