= Kiunga Airport =

Airport in Kiunga, Western, Papua New Guinea

- IATA: UNG; ICAO: AYKI

Summary
- Location: Kiunga, Papua New Guinea
- Coordinates: 6°7′32.4″S 141°16′55.2″E

Map
- Location of airport in Papua New Guinea

Kiunga Airport (IATA: UNG, ICAO: AYKI) is an airport in Kiunga, Papua New Guinea.

== Airlines and destinations ==
Kiunga Airport is connected to Lake Murray Airport, Mount Hagen Airport, Suki Airport and Tabubil Airport by PNG Air, and to Port Moresby International Airport by PNG Air and Air Niugini.
