= Buka Airport =

Airport on Buka Island, Papua New Guinea

Buka Island Airport
- IATA: BUA; ICAO: AYBK

Summary
- Airport type: Public
- Operator: Government
- Serves: Buka Island, Papua New Guinea
- Elevation AMSL: 11 ft (3.4 m)
- Coordinates: 05°25′20″S 154°40′21″E

Map
- Location of airport in Papua New Guinea

Runways
Direction	Length		Surface
Direction	ft	m	Surface
04/22	5,125	1,562	Asphalt
- Source: DAFIF

Buka Airport (IATA: BUA, ICAO: AYBK) is an airport serving Buka Island in the Autonomous Region of Bougainville in Papua New Guinea.

It is located at the southern end of the island, near Buka Passage behind the town of Buka, and pre-war Chinatown. The airport terminal is about 1.5 kilometres from the Buka Township.

== History ==
=== World War II ===
The origins of the airfield begin in 1941 when Australian troops built gun pits around a primitive airstrip in December 1941. On 2 January 1942 with the Japanese approaching, they prepared the airfield for demolition, blowing holes in the runway, and logs and pipes to prevent aircraft from landing. The following day, orders came to repair the field for aircraft evacuating from Rabaul to land. However, the airfield was occupied by the Japanese during mid-March 1942.

On 26 July, an Imperial Japanese Navy special detachment was sent to inspect Buka Airfield, but considered it unacceptable as a prospect for a speedily constructed major airfield. Nonetheless, by December 1942 the airfield was further improved by the Japanese with bitumen surfacing, an electrical power plant, underground fuel tanks, and new pillboxes and trenches. From December onwards many hulks were at the strip. Coastwatchers reported nighttime patrol flights during full moon. Also, scouting by a Betty Bomber flying down each coast of Bougainville and returning by afternoon as part of regular reconnaissance.

On 13 May 1943 Allied reconnaissance observed 36 fighters and 6 bombers at the airstrip. On 1 October 1943 Allied reconnaissance observed 35 aircraft at Buka, including 19 dive bombers. During 1943, the airfield was attacked repeatedly by Allied bombers, widely cratering the runway, and other areas.

In January 1944, the Allies drove the Japanese out of Buka, and the airfield was used for operations against the Japanese over New Guinea. A detachment of USAAF 419th Night Fighter Squadron flew P-61 Black Widows from the airfield from 25 January – 27 May 1944 before moving forward into New Guinea.

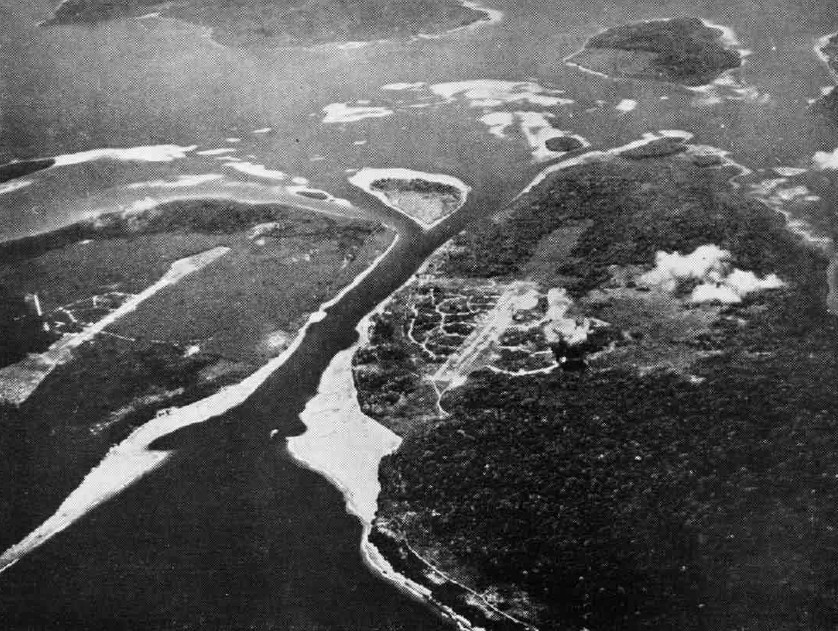
Aerial view of the Buka Passage showing Japanese-held Buka airfield (center) and Bonis airfield (left) in 1943

=== Postwar ===
Today the airport is the primary air portal into Bougainville, and even 75 years after the war, wreckage from the military use of the airfield by the Japanese and Americans is easily found in the area.

In 2004, the airport experienced some closures due to land disputes. Residents of Ieta prevented service at the airport, demanding the government pay land fees.

There used to be one navigational aid, the Buka NDB/DME situated on nearby Sohano Island. However this has been removed since December 2019.

In April 2026, President of the Autonomous Region of Bougainville, Ishmael Toroama, announced the launch of the region’s first airline, Bougainville Wings, based at Buka Airport. The airline is a joint venture between the Autonomous Bougainville Government (ABG) and Outback Aviation, with Bougainville holding a 70% stake.

== Airlines and destinations ==
Buka Airport is connected to Rabaul Airport by PNG Air and Air Niugini, and to Port Moresby International Airport and Lae Nadzab Airport by Air Niugini.

The airport services small narrow body jets or turboprop aircraft.

== Facilities ==
A small single storey terminal building houses check-in counters for both airlines serving the airport.

== See also ==
- Balalae Airport
- Bonis Airfield
- Buin Airport
- Kahili Airfield
- Kieta Airport
- USAAF in the South Pacific
