= Momote Airport =

Airport in Los Negros Island, Manus, Papua New Guinea

- IATA: MAS; ICAO: AYMO

Summary
- Airport type: Public
- Owner: PNG National Airports Corporation Limited
- Operator: PNG National Airports Corporation Ltd
- Serves: Lorengau, Manus Province
- Location: Los Negros Island, Papua New Guinea
- Elevation AMSL: 12 ft (3.7 m)
- Coordinates: 02°03′43″S 147°25′27″E

Map
- Location of airport in Papua New Guinea

Runways
Direction	Length		Surface
Direction	m	ft	Surface
16/34	1,870	6,136	Chipseal
- Source: DAFIF

Momote Airport (IATA: MAS, ICAO: AYMO) is an airport on Los Negros Island in the Admiralty Islands, Papua New Guinea. It also serves Manus Island, which is connected to Los Negros by a bridge.

== History ==
=== Hayne Airfield ===
Built by the Imperial Japanese at Momote during World War II. Known as Hayne Airfield by the Japanese, as they called Los Negros, Hayne Island. The runway was 4,100 feet (1,200 m) long × 300 feet (91 m) wide with three taxiways and 12 revetments under construction.

Occupied on 2 March 1944 by the US Army's 1st Cavalry Division as part of the Battle of Los Negros, which was part of the Admiralty Islands campaign.

==== Japanese Units based at Hayne Airfield ====
- 63rd Sentai, 3rd Chutai (Ki-43)
- 14th Sentai (Ki-21)

=== Momote Airfield ===
After liberating the airfield on 2 March 1944, the Seabees of the 40th Naval Construction Battalion repaired the airfield and the airfield became operational on 18 May 1944, although fighters were landing at the airfield only two days after occupation. The single runway was extended to 7,800 feet (2,400 m) long × 130 feet (40 m) wide with 75-foot (23 m) shoulders, constructed with a coral base with marsden matting covering 1,000 feet (300 m) at the ends of the runway. A 7,000-barrel fuel depot was set up at the airfield. The United States Navy established Aviation Repair and Overhaul Unit No.1 (AROU 1) in the spring of 1944 on Momote Airfield between Seeadler Harbor and the Bismarck Sea on Los Negros Island. AROU 1 conducted maintenance and testing of naval aircraft and supplied aircraft to naval forces for major assaults as far away as the Philippine Islands.

==== Allied Units Based at Momote Airfield ====
- Headquarters, Thirteenth Air Force, (15 June-13 September 1944)
- Headquarters, XIII Bomber Command, (June-3 September 1944)
- 5th Bomb Group Headquarters
  - 23d Bomb Squadron (B-24s)
  - 31st Bomb Squadron (B-24s)
  - 72d Bomb Squadron (B-24s)
  - 394th Bomb Squadron (B-24s)
- 307th Bombardment Group, (13 AF) (29 April-24 August 1944)
- 403d Troop Carrier Group, (13 AF) 30 August-4 October 1944
- Detachment, 419th Night Fighter Squadron, (13 AF) (27 June-18 August 1944)
- Aviation Repair and Overhaul Unit No.1 (AROU 1, USN) (est. late May 1944)
- No. 19 Squadron RNZAF (F4Us)
- No. 73 Wing RAAF
  - No. 76 Squadron RAAF (Kittyhawks)
  - No. 77 Squadron RAAF (Kittyhawks)
  - No. 79 Squadron RAAF (Spitfires)
- No. 27 Air Stores Park RAAF
- No. 114 (Mobile) Fighter Sector Headquarters RAAF
- No. 346 Radar Station RAAF

A memorial to the 1944 operation of the 1st Cavalry Division (United States) on Los Negros Island is located near the north end of the airfield.

== Facilities ==
The airport resides at an elevation of 12 feet (4 m) above mean sea level. It has one runway designated 16/34 with a chip seal surface measuring 1,870 by 45 metres (6,135 ft × 148 ft). The airport can accommodate B737 operations and night operations. The airport is sometimes used by private business jets as an alternative stop-over on the route between United States and India.

== Airlines and destinations ==
Air Niugini connects Momote Airport to Port Moresby International Airport, Kavieng Airport, Lae Nadzab Airport, and Madang Airport.

== See also ==
- USAAF in the Southwest Pacific
- Manus Island
- Admiralty Islands
- Manus Naval Base
