= Port Moresby International Airport =

Airport in Saraga, Port Moresby, Papua New Guinea

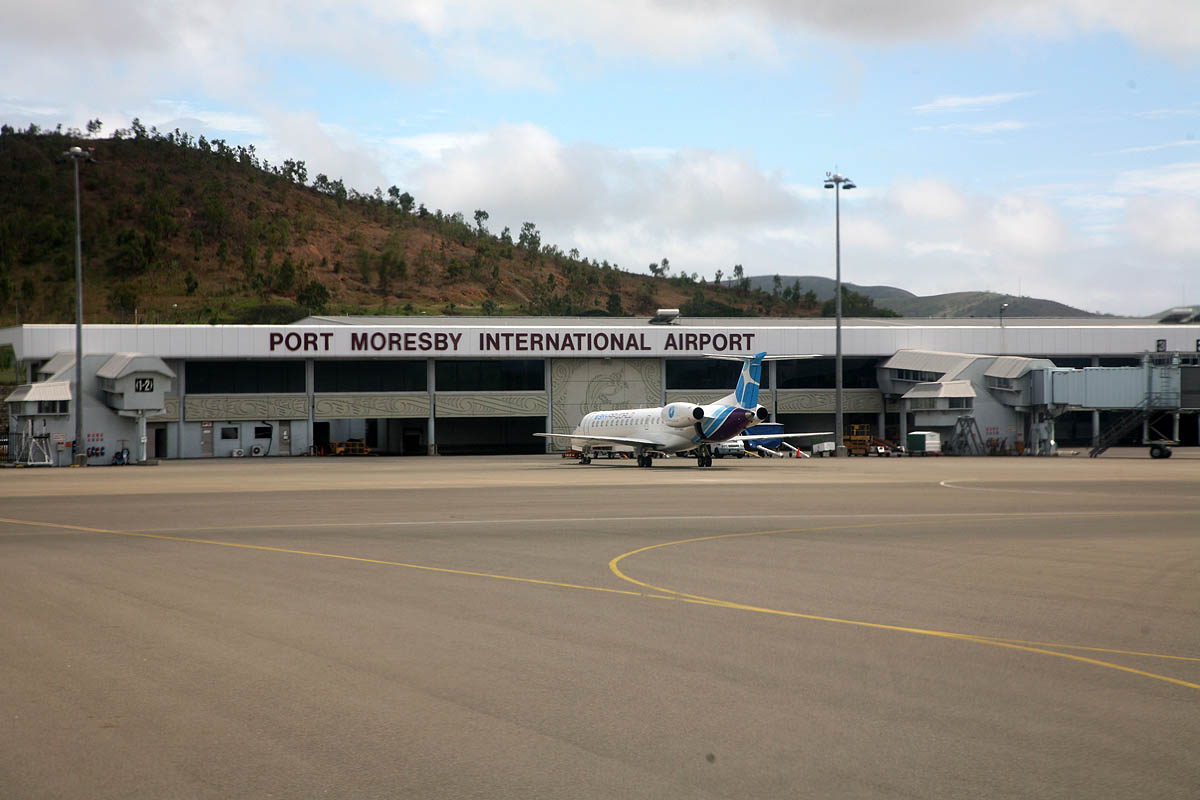
- IATA: POM; ICAO: AYPY; WMO: 94035

Summary
- Airport type: Public
- Owner: PNG National Airports Corporation Ltd
- Operator: PNG National Airports Corporation Ltd
- Serves: Port Moresby, Papua New Guinea
- Location: Saraga, Port Moresby
- Hub for: Air Niugini; PNG Air
- Elevation AMSL: 124 ft (38 m)
- Coordinates: 09°26′36″S 147°13′12″E

Map
- Location within Papua New Guinea Location within Oceania Location within Southeast Asia

Runways
Direction	Length		Surface
Direction	m	ft	Surface
14L/32R	2,750	9,022	Asphalt
14R/32L	1,300	4,265	Asphalt

Statistics (2025)
- Passenger movements: 1,600,000

Port Moresby International Airport (IATA: POM, ICAO: AYPY), also known as Jacksons International Airport, is an international airport located 8 kilometres (5 miles) outside of Port Moresby, the capital of Papua New Guinea. It is the largest and busiest airport in Papua New Guinea, with an estimated 1.6 million passengers using the airport in 2025, and is the main hub for Air Niugini, the national airline of Papua New Guinea, as well as the main hub for PNG Air. It replaced the original Port Moresby airport, in what is now the suburb of Waigani, whose airstrip remained until the 1990s but no trace of which remains, having been built over.

== History ==
Port Moresby International Airport originated as the 7 Mile Drome within the Port Moresby Airfield Complex. The strip was renamed Jackson Airfield in honour of Australian fighter ace John Francis Jackson, who was killed in action in 1942 during the New Guinea campaign.

== Terminals ==
Jacksons International Airport consists of two terminals: the Domestic Terminal, housing Air Niugini and PNG Air, and the International Terminal, servicing all other international airlines including Air Niugini's and PNG Air's international routes. The International Terminal features four aircraft parking bays, four of which are equipped with aerobridges. The two terminals are linked by a covered walkway.

== Airlines and destinations ==
=== Passenger ===
Airlines	Destinations
Air Niugini	Alotau, Auckland, Brisbane, Buka, Cairns, Daru, Goroka, Hong Kong, Honiara, Hoskins, Kavieng, Kiunga, Lae, Lorengau, Madang, Manila, Mount Hagen, Nadi, Popondetta, Port Vila, Rabaul, Singapore, Sydney, Tabubil, Tari, Tokyo–Narita, Tufi, Vanimo, Wapenamanda, Wewak
China Southern Airlines	Guangzhou
Philippine Airlines	Manila
PNG Air	Alotau, Daru, Goroka, Kiunga, Lae, Lihir Island, Mount Hagen, Popondetta, Rabaul, Tabubil, Wapenamanda
Qantas	Brisbane, Sydney
Solomon Airlines	Honiara

=== Cargo ===
Airlines	Destinations
Solomon Airlines	Honiara

== Other facilities ==
Air Niugini has its head office in the Air Niugini House, near the airport property.

== See also ==
- USAAF in the Southwest Pacific
- Kila Airfield (3-Mile Drome)
- Wards Airfield (5-Mile Drome)
- Berry Airfield (12-Mile Drome)
- Schwimmer Airfield (14-Mile Drome)
- Durand Airfield (17-Mile Drome)
- Rogers (Rarona) Airfield (30-Mile Drome)
- Fishermans (Daugo Island) Airfield
