= Hoskins Airport =

Airport in Hoskins, West New Britain, Papua New Guinea

- IATA: HKN; ICAO: AYHK

Summary
- Airport type: Public
- Location: New Britain island
- Elevation AMSL: 77 ft (23 m)
- Coordinates: 05°27′43.81″S 150°24′17.80″E

Map
- Location of airport in Papua New Guinea

Runways
Direction	Length		Surface
Direction	ft	m	Surface
12/30	5,212	1,589	Asphalt
- Source: World Aero Data

Hoskins Airport (IATA: HKN, ICAO: AYHK) is an airport in Hoskins (on the island of New Britain) in Papua New Guinea. The airport serves Kimbe - the capital of West New Britain province. Mount Pago is 16 km (9.9 mi) from the airport.

In December 2015, the Hoskins Kimbe Airport in West New Britain underwent major upgrades that have improved its airport service standards and revitalized the local economy.

The redevelopments to the Hoskins Airport include airstrip extensions, strengthened pavements, construction of a perimeter fence, installation of an eco-friendly sewerage system, solar-powered street lights, and a marketplace inside the airport boundary reserved for locals to sell their arts, crafts, and produce.

The National Airport Corporation and the Asian Development Bank coordinated the Hoskins Airport upgrade and employed the services of the local community in the project.

West New Britain Province, as a travel destination in Papua New Guinea, is well known for its world-class scuba-diving and game fishing.

The National Flag carrier Air Niugini and PNG Air operate daily flights to Hoskins Kimbe from major airports like Port Moresby, Lae, and Kokopo.

== Airlines and destinations ==
Hoskins Airport is connected to Lae Nadzab Airport and Rabaul Airport by PNG Air and by Air Niugini, and to Port Moresby International Airport by Air Niugini.
