= Tari Airport =

Airport in Tari, Papua New Guinea

Coordinates: 5.84500°S 142.94800°E

- IATA: TIZ; ICAO: AYTA

Summary
- Location: Tari
- Interactive map of Tari Airport

Tari Airport is an airport in Tari, Papua New Guinea (IATA: TIZ, ICAO: AYTA).

== Airlines and destinations ==
Air Niugini connects Tari Airport to Port Moresby International Airport.
