= Vanimo Airport =

- IATA: VAI; ICAO: AYVN

Summary
- Operator: PNG National Airports Corporation Ltd
- Serves: Vanimo
- Location: Vanimo, Papua New Guinea
- Elevation AMSL: 16 ft (4.9 m)
- Coordinates: 02°41′49.80″S 141°18′08.23″E

Map
- Location of airport in Vanimo, Papua New Guinea VAI/AYVN (Oceania)

Runways
Direction	Length		Surface
Direction	ft	m	Surface
12/30	5,775	1,760	Asphalt
- Source: World Aero Data

Vanimo Airport is an airport in Vanimo, Papua New Guinea (IATA: VAI, ICAO: AYVN).

== History ==
It became an international airport in 1980s when Air Niugini operated three-weekly flights to Port Moresby, via Jayapura and Wewak, but the service was ended due to financial crisis in Asia

== Airlines and destinations ==
Air Niugini and PNG Air connect Vanimo Airport to Wewak Airport.
