= Mount Hagen Airport =

Airport in Mount Hagen, Papua New Guinea

Kagamuga International Airport
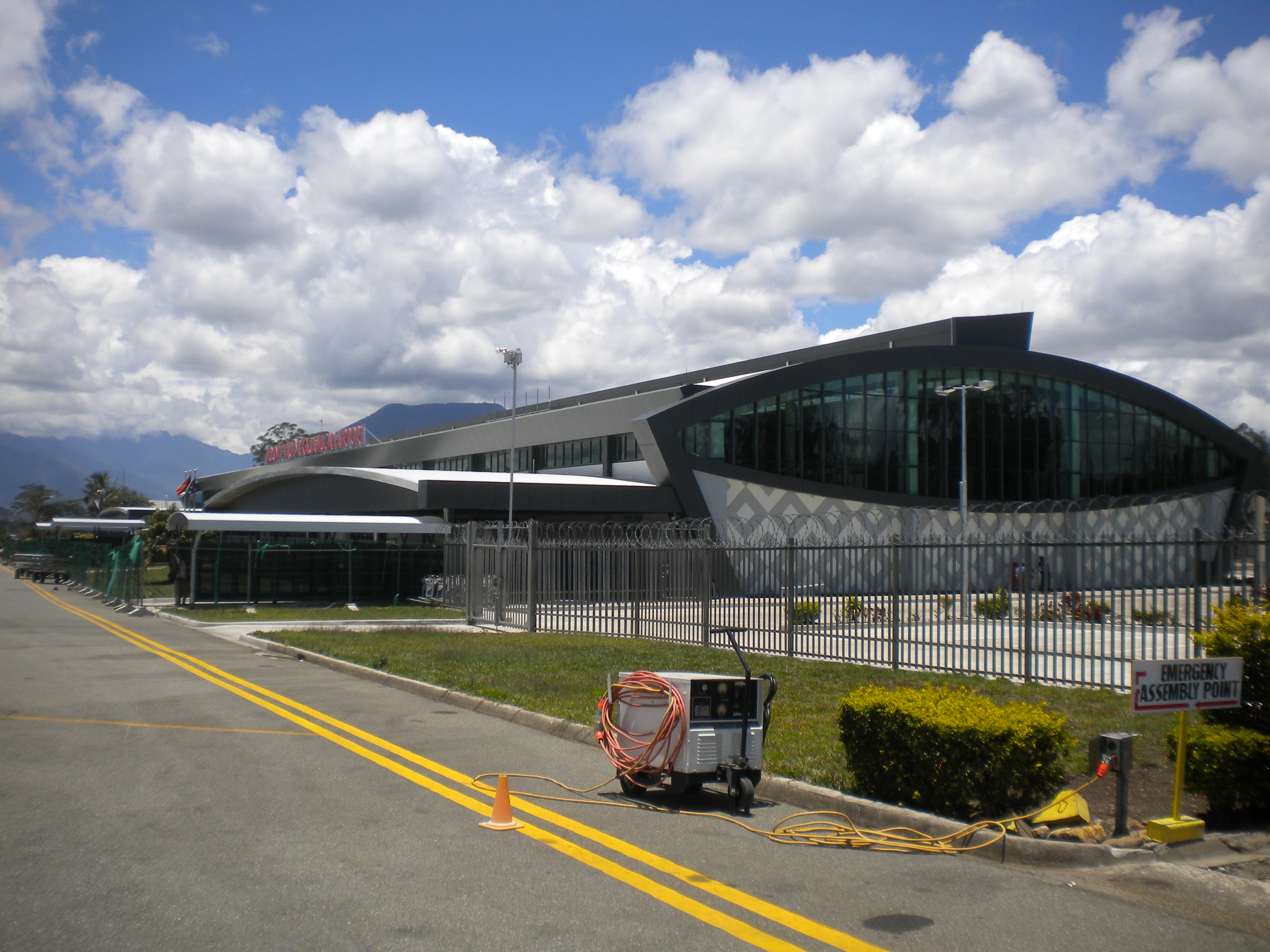
- IATA: HGU; ICAO: AYMH

Summary
- Airport type: Public
- Owner/Operator: National Airports Corporation (NAC) of Papua New Guinea
- Serves: Mount Hagen
- Location: Kagamuga, Papua New Guinea
- Elevation AMSL: 5,386 ft (1,642 m)
- Coordinates: 05°49′36.44″S 144°17′45.10″E

Map
- Location of airport in Mount Hagen, Papua New Guinea HGU/AYMH (Oceania)

Runways
| Direction | Length | | Surface |
| Direction | ft | m | Surface |
|---|---|---|---|
| 08/26 | 3,599 | 1,097 | Asphalt |
| 12/30 | 7,185 | 2,190 | Asphalt |
- Source: World Aero Data

Kagamuga International Airport (IATA: HGU, ICAO: AYMH) is the second biggest airport in Papua New Guinea (PNG) and is located in the Waghi Valley, 13 km north-east of Mount Hagen, the capital of Western Highlands Province of Papua New Guinea. The airport has one terminal and two runways, and is operated by its owner, National Airports Corporation of Papua New Guinea.

== History ==
Kagamuga Airport was built in 1934. It was used by missionaries and the Australian administration for air service to Mount Hagen. It was renovated during World War II.

The airport underwent a renovation starting in 2013. Constructed at a low level, the pre-existing terminal building was exposed to a water drainage problem and was regularly affected by waterlogging.

The reconstruction fell under the scope of the Civil Aviation Development Investment Program (CADIP) which aimed to increase the safety, accessibility and reliability of airports in PNG. The Government of PNG and the Asian Development Bank (ADB) jointly funded the airport development project.

Reconstructed at a cost of approximately 70 million Papua New Guinean kina (US$23 million), the main terminal building reopened in 2015.

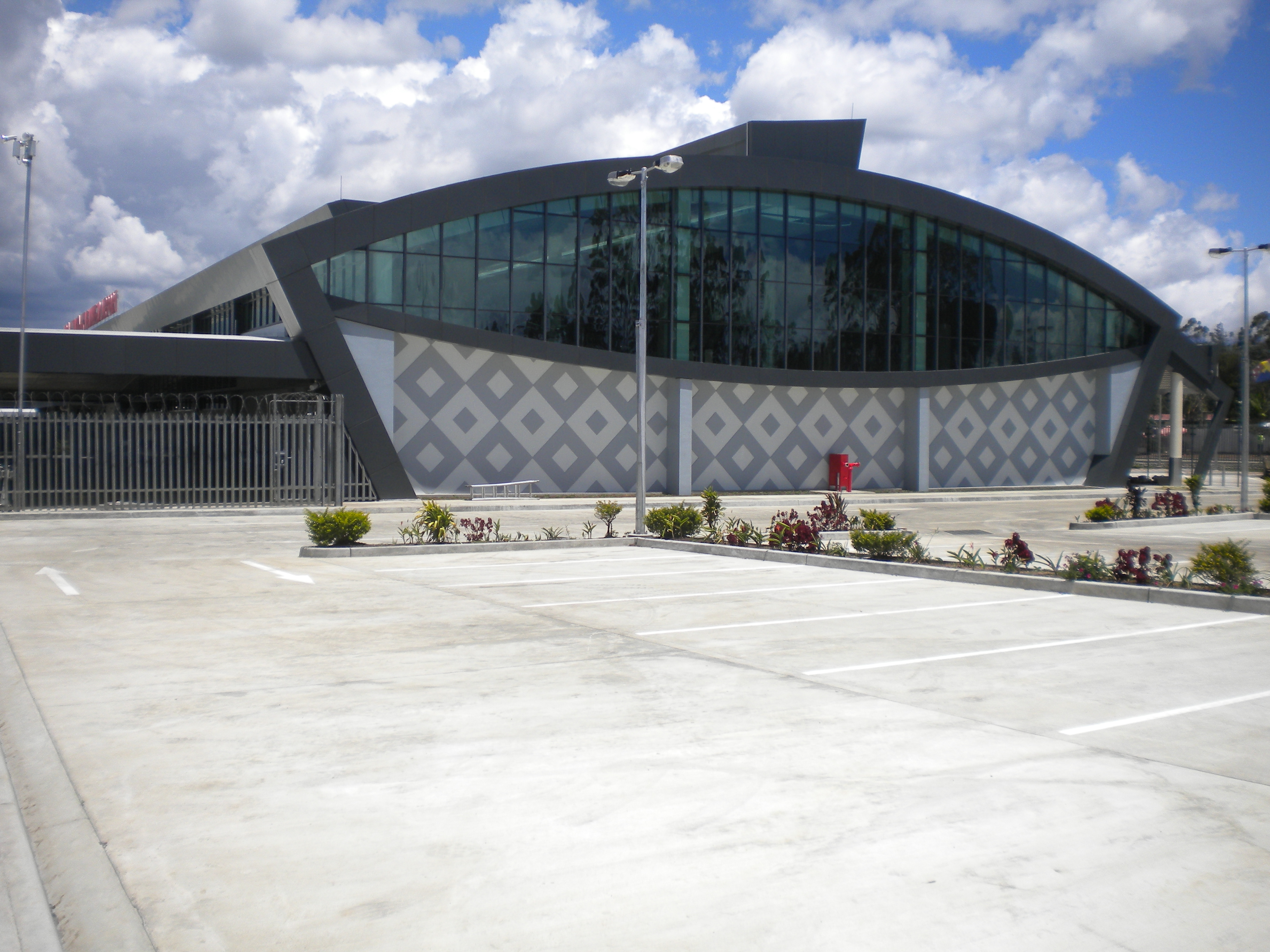
The new main terminal building

A Mount Hagen axe appears on Papua New Guinea's currency.

A local artefact, the Mount Hagen axe, provided inspiration for the design of the newly constructed terminal, with the exteriors shaped like the axe and decorated in traditional patterns. The sewerage treatment system integrated into the construction of the building converts the liquid waste into fertiliser after separating it from the solid waste.

In 2018, the airport was closed for two days due to security concerns after a dispute between guards and a local landowning group.

In 2019/2020, the Mount Hagen Kagamuga Airport was used for all the flights of Air Niugini using Wapenamanda due to maintenance work on the runways at that airport, performed by the National Airports Corporation.

== Airlines and destinations ==
| Airlines | Destinations |
|---|---|
| Air Niugini | Port Moresby, Wewak |
| Hevilift | Charter: Cairns, Port Moresby |
| MAF | Sumbai, Telefomin |
| PNG Air | Goroka, Kiunga, Moro, Port Moresby, Tabubil, Wewak |

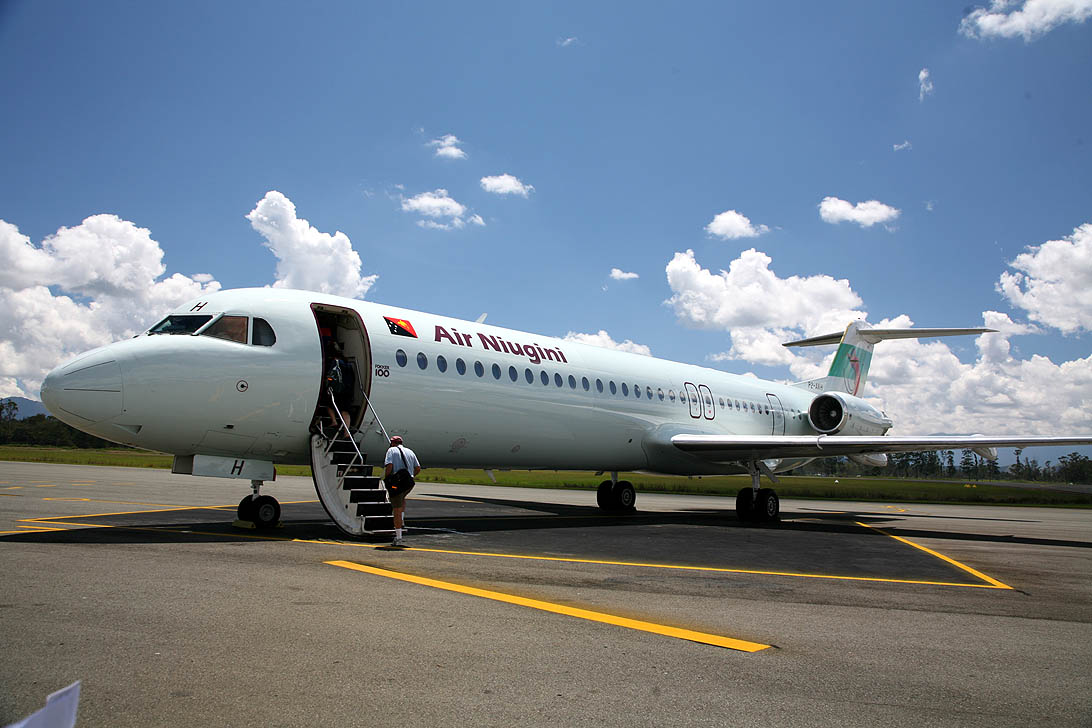
Air Niugini Fokker-100 (P2-ANH) parked at Mt. Hagen's Kagamuga Airport

Air Nuigini operates daily services to Port Moresby with Fokker 100. PNG Air operates daily services with ATR 72-600.

== Facilities ==
Kagamuga International airport has one main terminal housing Air Niugini, Hevilift, and PNG Air. The airport facility has been rebuilt from the ground up, and reopened in November 2015. In 2019, a new baggage x-ray machine was supplied, free of charge, by the Australian Department of Home Affairs. It was delivered by the Royal Australian Air Force, who used a Lockheed C-130 Hercules to transport it from Port Moresby to Mount Hagen.

== Runways ==
Kagamuga International Airport has two runways. The main runway bears the designation 12/30 and measures 2190 metres in length by 30 metres in width. The second runway is designated as 08/26 and is 1097 m long by 18 m wide.

Navigational aid equipment of both runways includes precision approach path indicator (PAPI), non-directional beacon (NDB), distance measuring equipment (DME), and approach and tower (TWR) facilities.
