= Air Niugini =

Flag carrier of Papua New Guinea

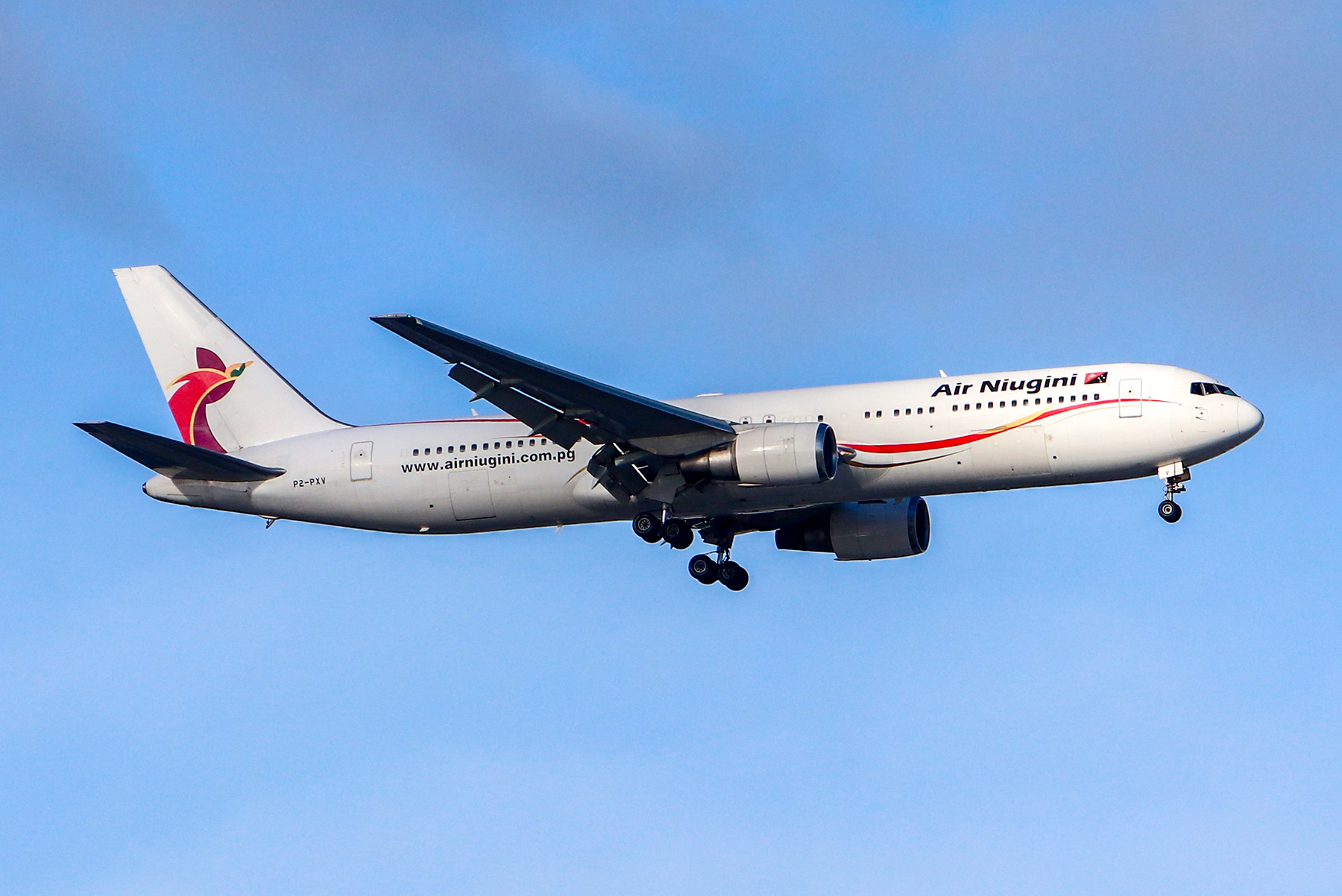
- Air Niugini Boeing 767-300ER
IATA	ICAO	Call sign
PX	ANG	NIUGINI
- Founded: November 1973; 53 years ago
- Hubs: Port Moresby International Airport
- Frequent-flyer program: Destinations
- Subsidiaries: Link PNG
- Fleet size: 25
- Destinations: 32
- Headquarters: Port Moresby, Papua New Guinea
- Key people: Alan Milne (CEO); Karl Yalo (Chairman)
- Website: airniugini.com.pg

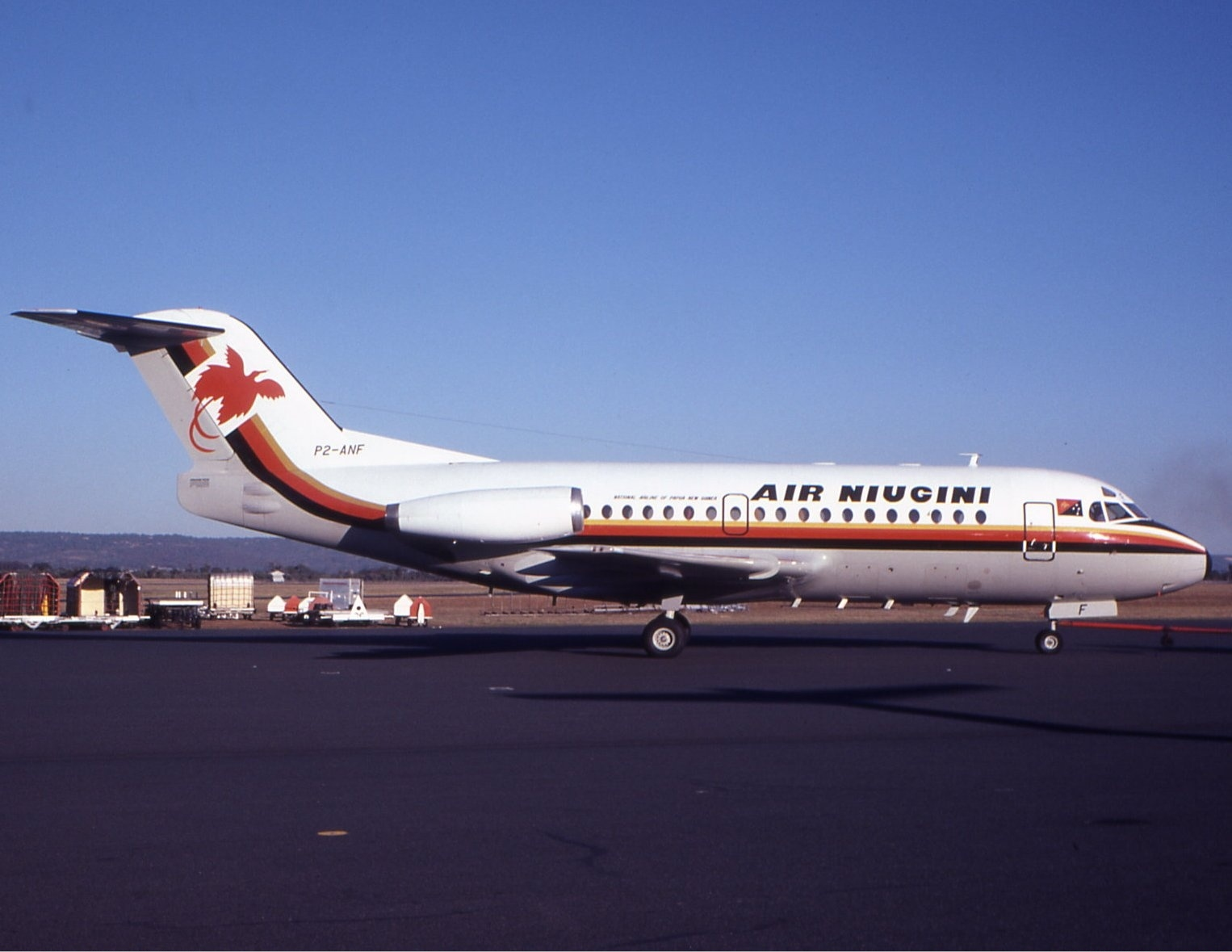
A former Air Niugini Fokker F28 in the 1980s

Air Niugini Limited is the flag carrier of Papua New Guinea, based in Air Niugini House on the site of Port Moresby International Airport, Port Moresby. It operates a domestic network from Port Moresby to 12 major airports while its subsidiary company, Link PNG, operates routes to minor airports. It also operates international services in Asia, Oceania, and Australia on a weekly basis. Its main base is Port Moresby International Airport, which is located in 7 Mile, Port Moresby, Papua New Guinea. Niugini is the Tok Pisin word for New Guinea.

== History ==
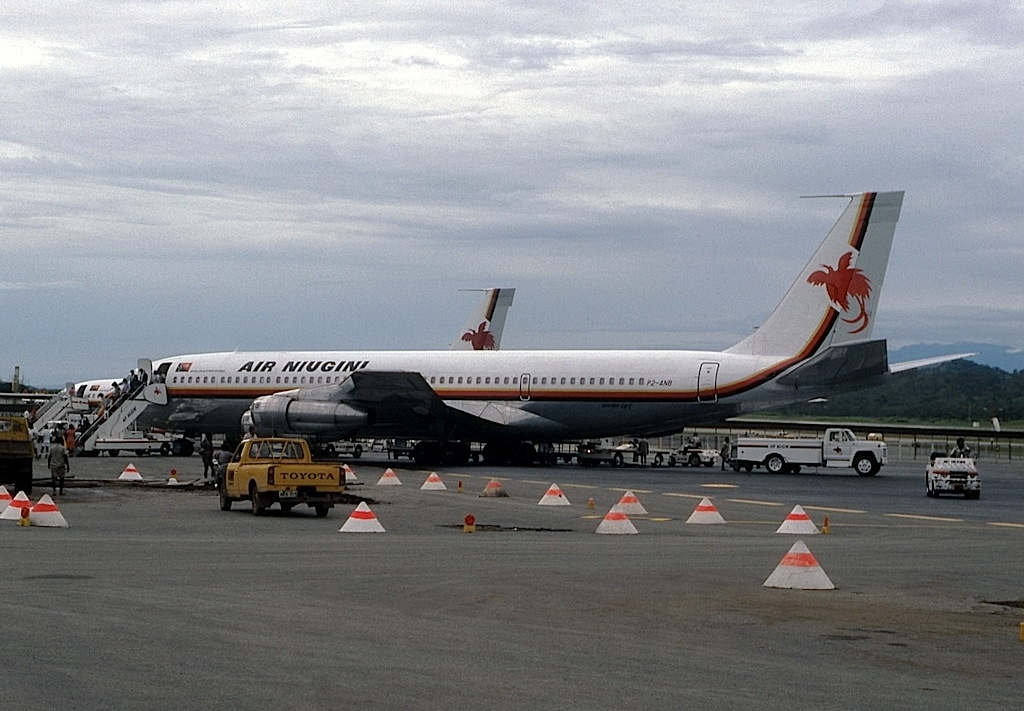
Boeing 707 at Port Moresby in 1980

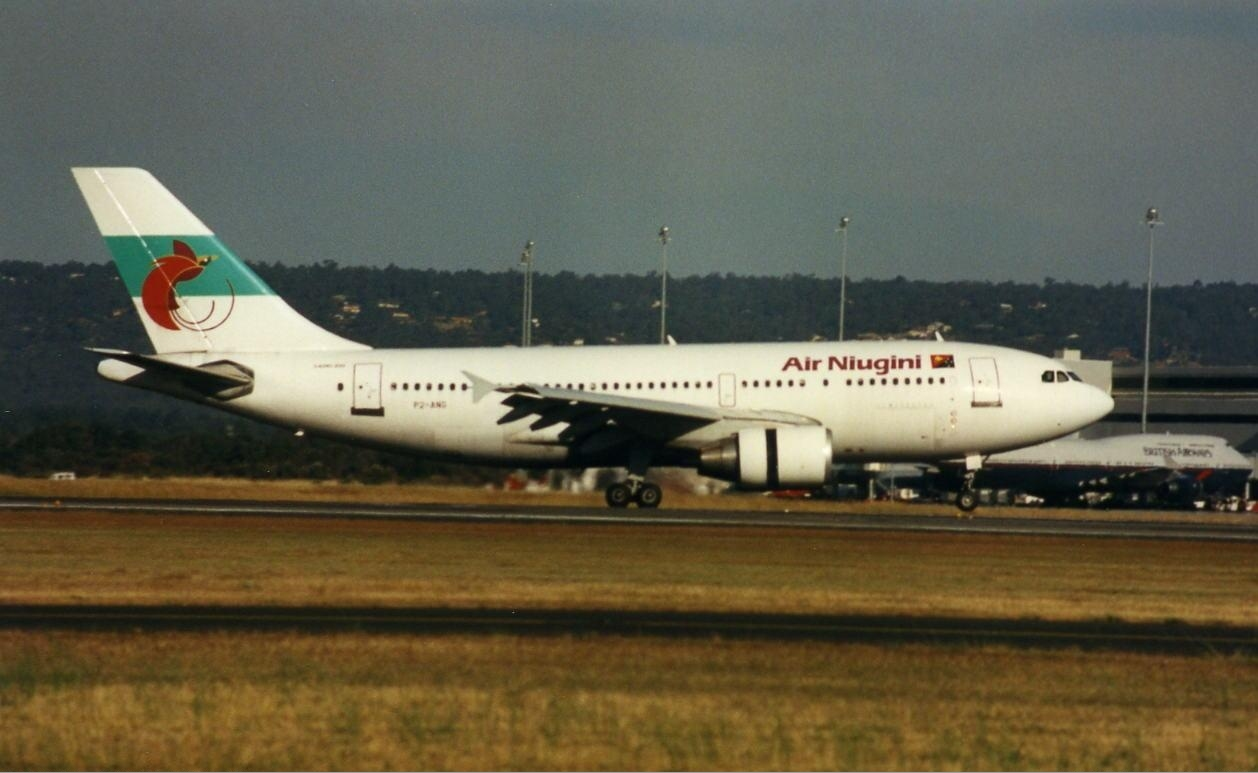
A former Air Niugini Airbus A310-300 in the 1990s

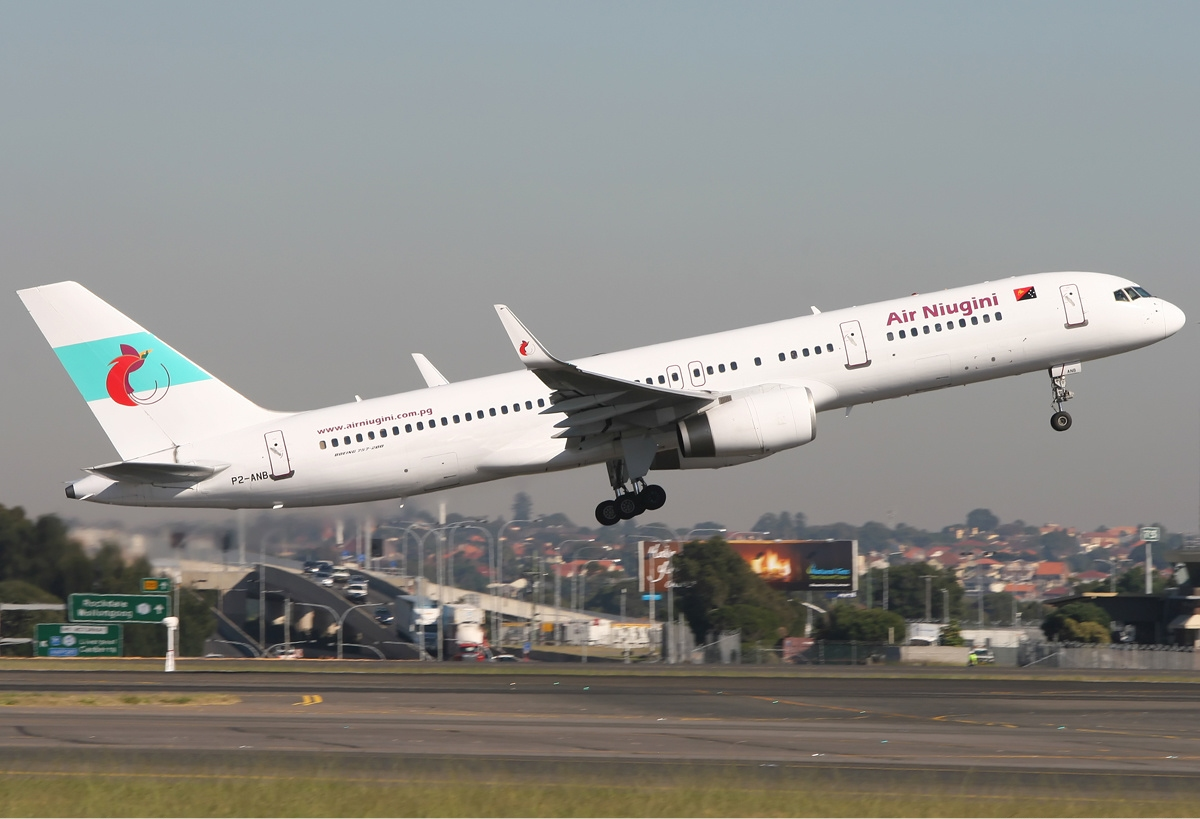
A former Air Niugini Boeing 757-200 in 2010

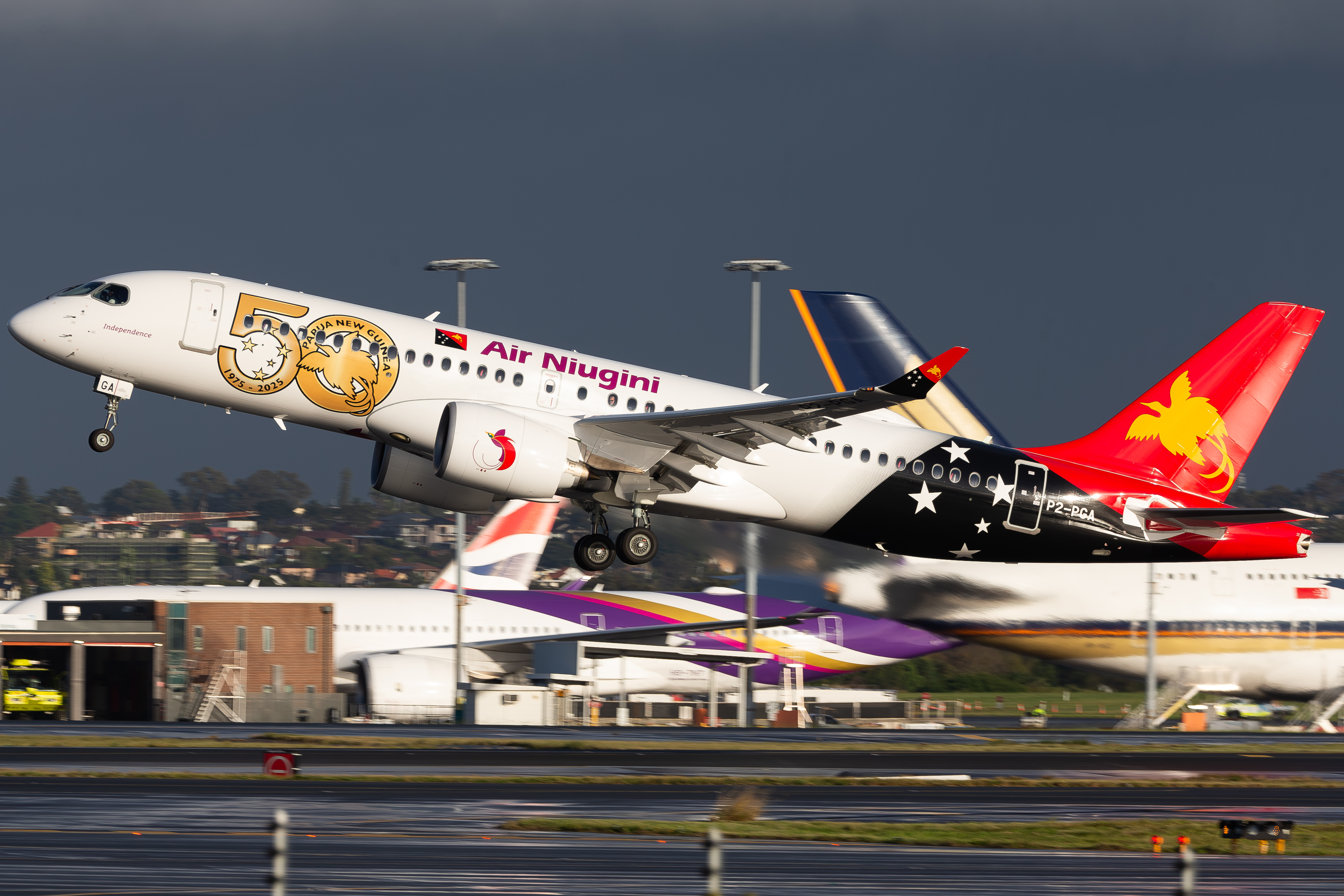
Airbus A220-300 P2-PGA departing Sydney Airport, 2026

The airline was established in November 1973 as the national airline of Papua New Guinea with the government holding 60% of the shares, with the rest divided between Australian airline companies Ansett (16%), Qantas (12%) and Trans Australia Airlines (TAA) (12%). It started as an exclusively domestic carrier, but soon expanded to offer international services. In founding the airline, the government aimed to encourage regional development in a country without an extensive road network. The airline was established using DC-3 and Fokker F27 aircraft.

International services commenced very early on in the history of the airline with a leased Boeing 720 from 6 February 1976 to 2 February 1977. This was later replaced with a Boeing 707 purchased from Qantas. During the late 1970s, internal services were performed by a combination of Fokker F28 jet and Fokker F27 turbo-prop aircraft. By the end of 1975 Air Niugini leased Boeing 727-200 type aircraft from Ansett and TAA to serve routes to Brisbane. The airline also acquired a lease of a Boeing 707 from Qantas to commence a weekly service to Manila and Hong Kong. In 1976, the government bought out the Qantas and TAA holdings and in 1980 acquired the Ansett shares to make the airline wholly government owned. The fleet of F-27s was phased out in the early 1980s with the introduction of the newly developed De Havilland Canada Dash 7 four-engine turbo-prop.

In 1979, Air Niugini opened routes to Honolulu and to Singapore via Jakarta. That same year, new facilities were opened at Jacksons Airport and new Sales Offices opened in Hong Kong, Tokyo, Europe and the United States. Air Niugini operated their Boeing 707 from Auckland to Hong Kong via Port Moresby in a tripartite agreement with Air New Zealand and Cathay Pacific. This service ran from 1981 to 1985.

In 1984, the airline replaced the two Boeing 707 aircraft with an Airbus A300 on lease from TAA. This was replaced several years later with two Airbus A310s as the carrier expanded to offer flights principally between Australian Eastern capital cities and destinations in Asia such as Singapore and Manila via their hub at Port Moresby.

The airline endured considerable hardships in the 1990s, with unrest in Bougainville and a volcanic eruption in Rabaul destabilising the company's busiest domestic services. The Asian currency crisis also made an impact, with Air Niugini posting financial losses during this decade. The government of Papua New Guinea responded by cutting jobs from the airline, suppressing wages, as well as opening offices in Asia and Europe in an attempt at having the airline run profitably. The reforms bore fruit by 2003, with the airline posting a profit of US$15.8 million for that year.

A Boeing 767 was acquired in August 2002, replacing the Airbus aircraft, and was used to offer expanded international services. Combined with aggressive pricing, this made it the most competitively priced airline on many of its routes. A sharing agreement still exists with Qantas in which that airline buys "blocks" of seats on Air Niugini's flights between Port Moresby and Australia.

The financial turnaround seems to have stymied pressure from various sectors, including the IMF and the Australian Government, to privatise the national carrier. The PNG government has voiced concerns that privatisation would jeopardise domestic routes that provide a vital service to regional people and encourage economic development, but which fail to realise a profit.

From September 2004, Fokker 100s have been introduced to start to replace the aging Fokker F28 aircraft that are used on domestic routes, the daily Cairns service, and the twice a week service to Honiara in the Solomon Islands.

In March 2006, Transport and Civil Aviation Minister Don Polye announced an open air policy, which would allow other airlines to fly international routes into and from Papua New Guinea. The policy will take effect in 2007.

In December 2007, Air Niugini returned its leased Boeing 767 aircraft to its owners, Air New Zealand. The airline briefly entered a wet lease arrangement with Viva Macau before taking up a lease with Icelandair for a Boeing 767-300ER and a Boeing 757-200W. The 757 was returned in March 2011 and replaced with two additional 767-300ER aircraft.

On 18 April 2008, flights commenced on the Sydney-Port Moresby route initially using leased Embraer 190 aircraft leased from SkyAirWorld of Australia.

On 15 October 2014, Air Niugini announced a wholly owned subsidiary airline company, Link PNG, which commenced operations on 1 November 2014 to coincide with Air Niugini's 41 years of operation. Link PNG principally services routes to provincial and district centres which were being operated by the Air Niugini Dash-8-Q200 and Q300 aircraft. 7 Fokker-70 aircraft were acquired (October 2015) from KLM and were transferred during October-December 2015.

In June 2018, people rioting in the town of Mendi following disputed election results destroyed a Link PNG Dash-8 at the town's airport.

On 14 June 2019, Air Niugini announced it would take over the Cairns-Hong Kong route that Cathay Pacific was abandoning. They would fly via Port Moresby hoping to have considerable income derived from transporting live seafood to Asian markets.

In July 2023, Air Niugini announced the order of two Boeing 787-8 as replacements for their pair of aging 767-300ER. The airline ordered six Airbus A220-100s in November 2023, with a further two A220-100s and three A220-300s to be leased. The Airbus A220s will replace Air Niugini's Fokker 70s and Fokker 100s. A SkyUp Airlines Boeing 737 was acquired under a wet lease in 2023.

On 11 September 2025, Air Niugini took delivery of the airline's first Airbus A220-300, on lease from Azorra Aviation, registered P2-PGA. Dubbed "People's Balus", the aircraft was painted in a special scheme to commemorate 50 years of Papuan independence.

On 18 February 2026, Air Niugini cancelled its order for two Boeing 787-8 Dreamliners which were to replace its the two Boeing 767-300ERs.

== Destinations ==
Air Niugini operates to 22 domestic destinations and ten international destinations in six countries across Asia and Oceania as of August 2026:

Country	City	Airport	Notes	Refs
Australia	Brisbane	Brisbane Airport		
Australia	Cairns	Cairns Airport		
Australia	Sydney	Sydney Airport		
Australia	Townsville	Townsville Airport	Terminated	
Fiji	Nadi	Nadi International Airport		
Hong Kong	Hong Kong	Hong Kong International Airport		
Indonesia	Denpasar	Ngurah Rai International Airport	Terminated	
Indonesia	Jakarta	Jakarta Airport	Terminated	
Japan	Tokyo	Narita International Airport		
New Zealand	Auckland	Auckland Airport		
Papua New Guinea	Alotau	Gurney Airport		
Papua New Guinea	Buka	Buka Airport		
Papua New Guinea	Daru	Daru Airport		
Papua New Guinea	Goroka	Goroka Airport		
Papua New Guinea	Hoskins	Hoskins Airport		
Papua New Guinea	Kavieng	Kavieng Airport		
Papua New Guinea	Kundiawa	Cimbu Airport		
Papua New Guinea	Kiunga	Kiunga Airport		
Papua New Guinea	Lae	Lae Nadzab Airport		
Papua New Guinea	Lihir	Lihir Island Airport		
Papua New Guinea	Lorengau	Lorengau Airport		
Papua New Guinea	Madang	Madang Airport		
Papua New Guinea	Mount Hagen	Mount Hagen Airport		
Papua New Guinea	Popondetta	Popondetta Airport		
Papua New Guinea	Port Moresby	Port Moresby International Airport	Hub	
Papua New Guinea	Rabaul	Rabaul Airport		
Papua New Guinea	Tabubil	Tabubil Airport		
Papua New Guinea	Tari	Tari Airport		
Papua New Guinea	Tufi	Tufi Airport		
Papua New Guinea	Vanimo	Vanimo Airport		
Papua New Guinea	Wapenamanda	Wapenamanda Airport		
Papua New Guinea	Wewak	Wewak Airport		
Philippines	Cebu	Mactan–Cebu International Airport	Terminated	
Philippines	Manila	Ninoy Aquino International Airport		
Singapore	Singapore	Changi Airport		
Solomon Islands	Honiara	Honiara International Airport		
United States	Honolulu	Honolulu International Airport	Terminated	
Vanuatu	Port Vila	Bauerfield International Airport		

=== Codeshare agreements ===
Air Niugini has codeshare agreements with the following airlines:

- Cathay Pacific
- Qantas
- Solomon Airlines

== Fleet ==
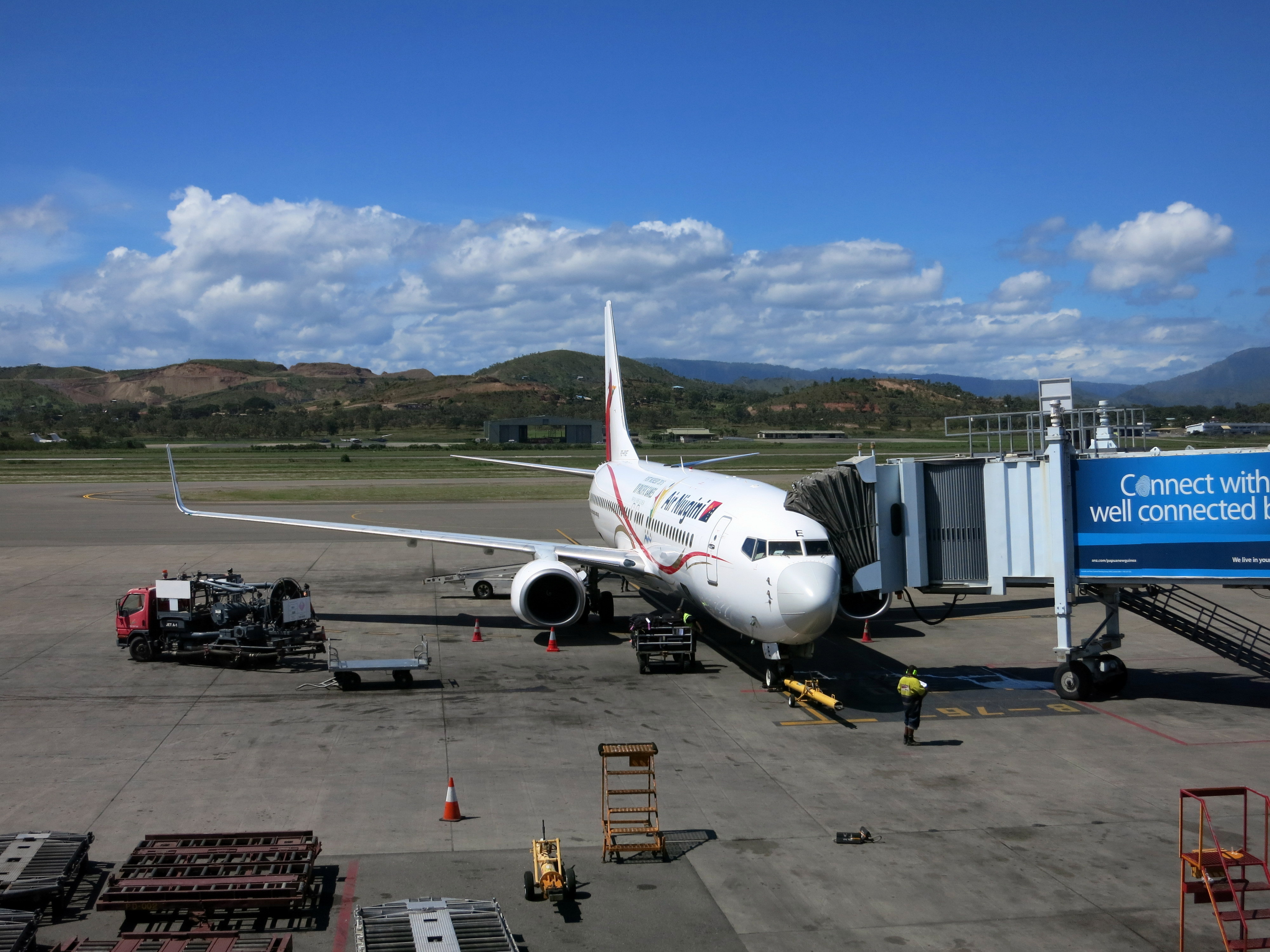
Air Niugini Boeing 737-800

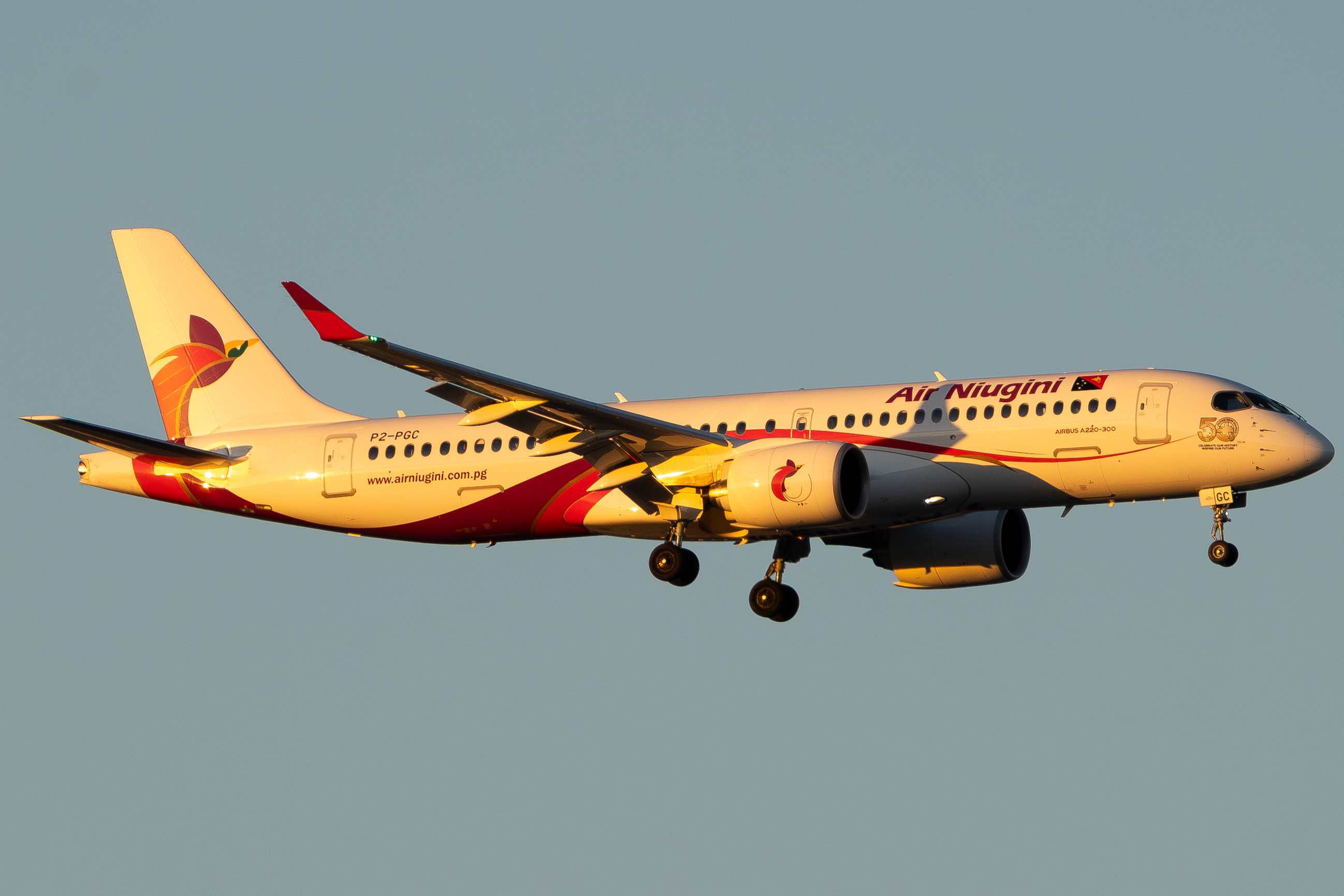
Air Niugini Airbus A220-300

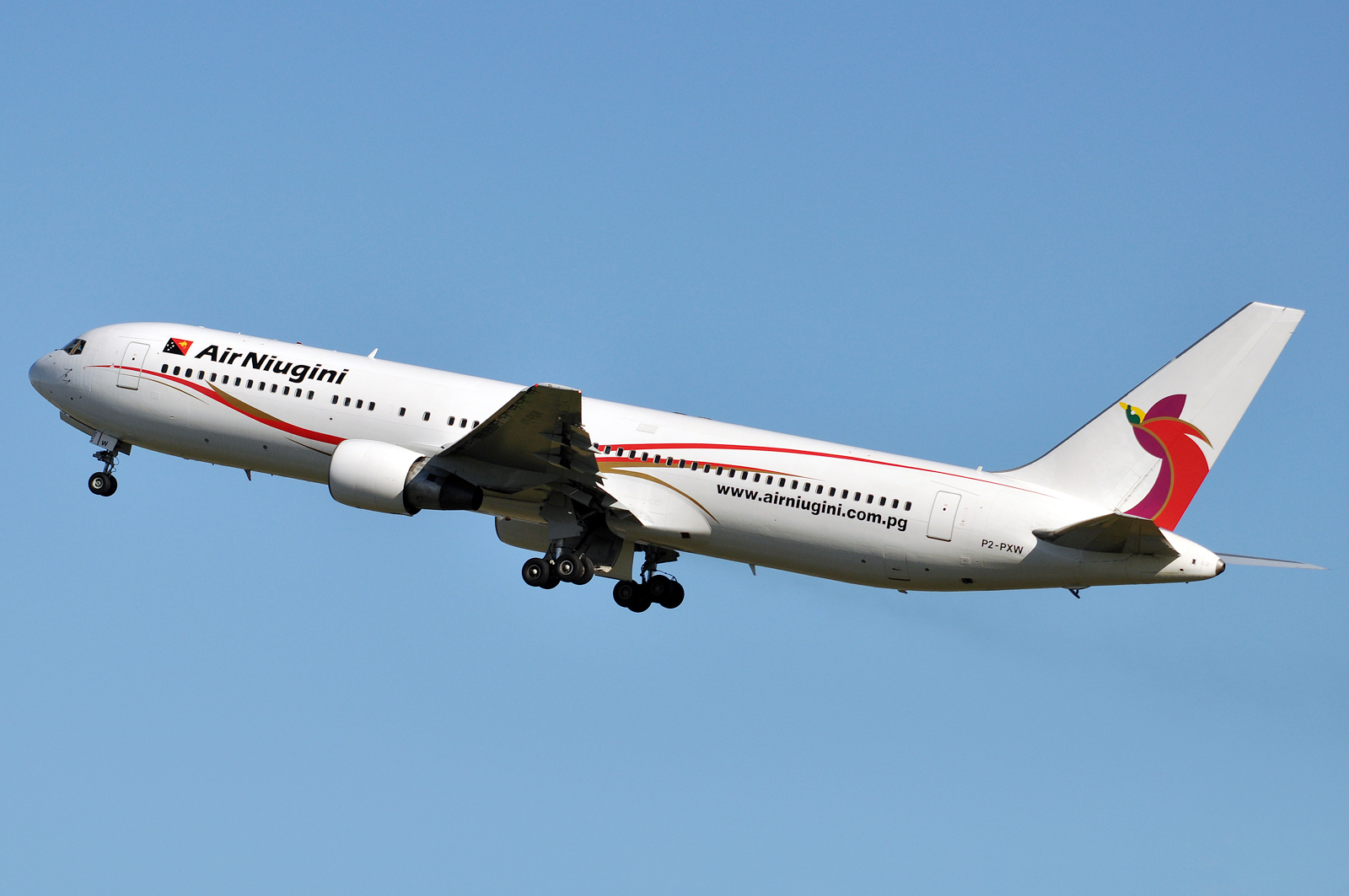
Air Niugini Boeing 767-300ER

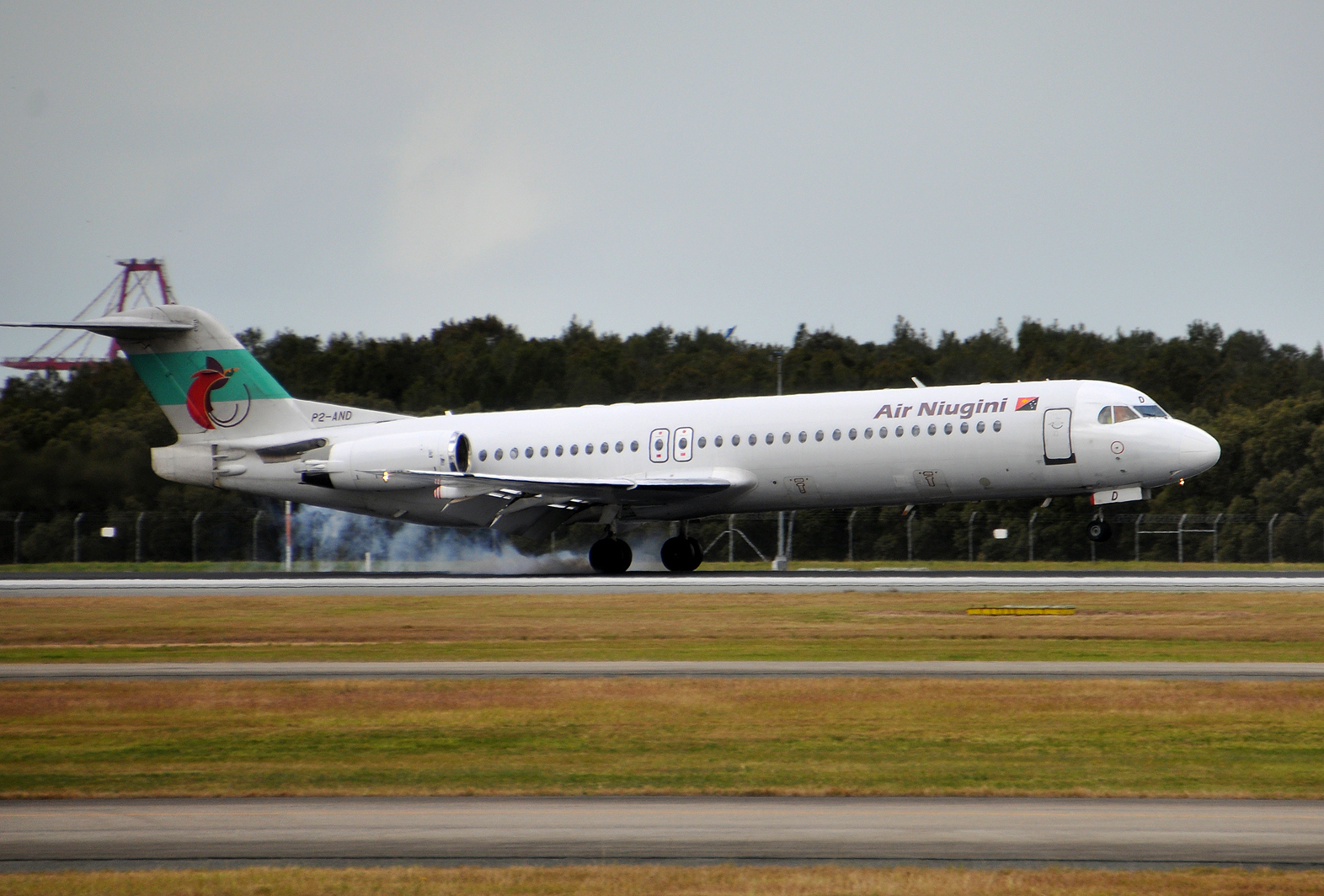
Air Niugini Fokker 100

=== Current fleet ===
As of February 2025, the Air Niugini fleet consists of the following aircraft:

Air Niugini fleet
Aircraft	In service	Orders	Passengers			Notes
Aircraft	In service	Orders	J	Y	Total	Notes
Airbus A220-100	3	5	TBA		114	Deliveries began in September 2025. To replace aging Fokker aircraft.
Airbus A220-300	-	3	8	130	138	Deliveries began in September 2025. To replace aging Fokker aircraft.
Boeing 767-300ER	2	—	28	167	195	1 leased from Loftleidir Icelandic.
Fokker 70	4	—	8	65	73	To be retired and replaced by Airbus A220.
Total		11				To be retired and replaced by Airbus A220.

In January 2026, Air Niugini canceled its order for two 787s.

== Incidents and accidents ==
On the morning of 28 September 2018, Flight PX 73 (operated by Boeing 737-800 P2-PXE) landed 443 feet (135 m) short of the runway into a lagoon off Chuuk International Airport in Weno, Chuuk of the Federated States of Micronesia. There were 47 people on board the aircraft (36 passengers and 11 crew). According to initial reports, all 47 survived, and there were no serious injuries. However, shortly after the crash, the airline reported one missing passenger. On 1 October, two days after the crash, Air Niugini announced the death of a single male passenger.

On November 21, 2026, Flight PX19, a Boeing 767-383ER carrying 146 passengers and crew from Hong Kong to Port Moresby, made an emergency landing at Francisco Bangoy International Airport in Davao City, Philippines after its right engine caught fire. There were no casualties.

== See also ==
- List of airlines of Papua New Guinea
