= Goroka Airport =

Airport in Goroka, Eastern Highlands, Papua New Guinea

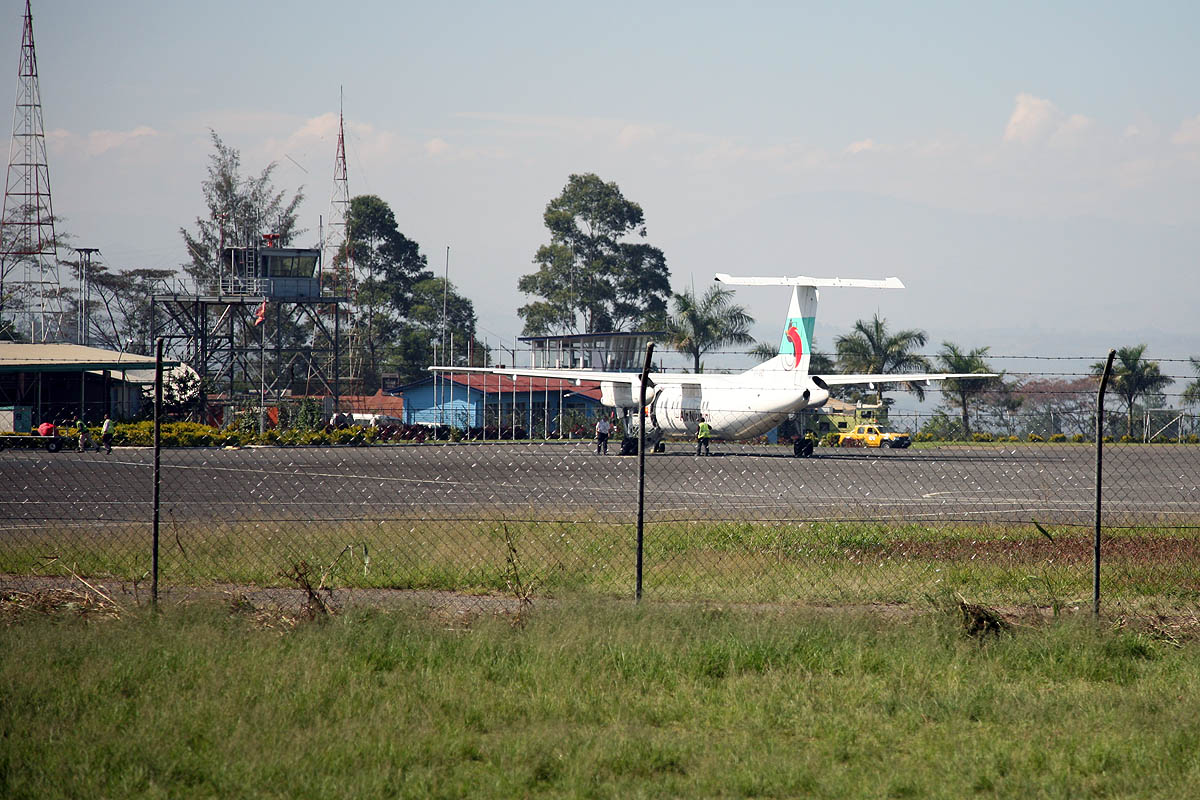
- IATA: GKA; ICAO: AYGA

Summary
- Airport type: Public
- Location: Goroka, Papua New Guinea
- Elevation AMSL: 5,199 ft (1,585 m)
- Coordinates: 06°04′54.08″S 145°23′30.77″E

Map
- Location of airport in Papua New Guinea

Runways
Direction	Length		Surface
Direction	ft	m	Surface
17R/35L	5,400	1,646	Asphalt
17L/35R	3,983	1,214	Asphalt
- Source: World Aero Data

Goroka Airport is an airport in Goroka, Papua New Guinea.

== Domestic terminal ==
The Terminal operates two flights daily to Port Moresby. The departure lounge contains a snack shop and an Avis car hire center.

An Air Niugini Travel Agent operates beside the terminal.

== Airlines and destinations ==
Goroka Airport is connected to Lae Nadzab Airport and Mount Hagen Airport by PNG Air, and to Port Moresby International Airport by Air Niugini and PNG Air.
