= Wapenamanda Airport =

- IATA: WBM; ICAO: AYWD

Summary
- Airport type: Public
- Serves: Wapenamanda
- Location: Wapenamanda, Papua New Guinea
- Elevation AMSL: 5,889 ft (1,795 m)
- Coordinates: 05°38′35.89″S 143°53′43.48″E
- Interactive map of Wapenamanda Airport

Runways
| Direction | Length | | Surface |
| Direction | ft | m | Surface |
|---|---|---|---|
| 14/32 | 5,052 | 1,540 | Asphalt |
- Source: World Aero Data

Wapenamanda Airport ((IATA: WBM, ICAO: AYWD)) is located in Wapenamanda, Enga Province, Papua New Guinea.

== Airlines and destinations ==
Air Niugini connects Wapenamanda Airport to Port Moresby International Airport.
