= Rabaul Airport =

Airport in Rabaul, East New Britain, Papua New Guinea

Rabaul Airport Tokua Airport
- IATA: RAB; ICAO: AYTK

Summary
- Airport type: Public
- Operator: Government
- Location: Rabaul, Papua-New Guinea
- Elevation AMSL: 49 ft (15 m)
- Coordinates: 04°20′25″S 152°22′46″E

Map
- Location of airport in Papua New Guinea

Runways
Direction	Length		Surface
Direction	ft	m	Surface
10/28	5,643	1,720	Asphalt
- Source: DAFIF

Rabaul Airport, also called Tokua Airport, (IATA: RAB, ICAO: AYTK) is an airport serving Kokopo and Rabaul, the current and former capitals of East New Britain Province, respectively, on New Britain island in Papua New Guinea.

== History ==
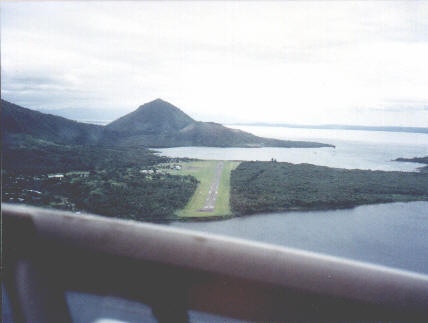
Old Rabaul Airport (17 Feb 1988)

Originally, Kokopo and Rabaul was served by the former Lakunai Airfield. It was located at the foot of the Tavurvur volcano, near Matupit island. In 1994, a volcanic eruption destroyed the town and the airport, and a new airport was subsequently built and opened at Tokua. It was located on the opposite side of the Rabaul caldera.

The former airport was located at 04°13′27″S 152°11′08″E.

A volcanic eruption closed the airport for a day in 2006.

== Facilities ==
The airport is 32 feet (10 m) above mean sea level. It has one runway designated 10/28 with an asphalt surface measuring 5,643 by 92 feet (1,720 m × 28 m).

== Airlines and destinations ==
Airlines	Destinations
Air Niugini	Buka, Kavieng, Port Moresby
PNG Air	Buka, Hoskins, Lae, Port Moresby
