= Kavieng Airport =

Airport in Kavieng, Papua New Guinea

- IATA: KVG; ICAO: AYKV

Summary
- Airport type: Public
- Location: Kavieng
- Elevation AMSL: 4.6 m (15 ft)
- Coordinates: 02°34′45″S 150°48′28″E

Map
- Location of airport in Papua New Guinea

Runways
Direction	Length		Surface
Direction	m	ft	Surface
12/30	1,782	5,846	Asphalt

Kavieng Airport (IATA: KVG, ICAO: AYKV) is located in Kavieng, New Ireland, Papua New Guinea and is located approximately 1 km away from the town centre.

Originally constructed by Australian commandos as a single runway, it was later taken and occupied by the Japanese on 23 Jan 1942, going on to expand and improve it. The airbase was regularly bombed by the Americans throughout 1943–44, the Japanese continued to actively use the airbase until 1944.

After the end of the war, it was converted to civilian use, and now possesses a modern, though small, terminal facility.

On 17 Jun, 2016 an agreement was signed with the New Ireland Provincial Government to initiate the Kavieng Airport Project, intended to upgrade the site to an international airport. To do this the existing runway was extended in width and length to meet international standards. The work was completed after some delays, with a celebration ceremony attended by the PNG Prime Minister on 22 Nov 2022.

== Airlines and destinations ==
Air Niugini connects Kavieng Airport to Port Moresby International Airport, Rabaul Airport, and Momote Airport (Lorengau).
