= List of airports in Papua New Guinea =

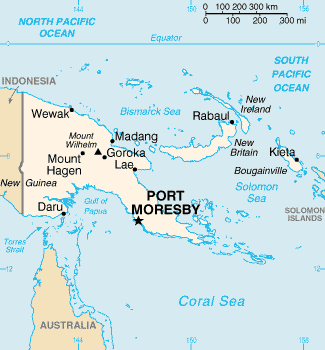
Map of Papua New Guinea

This is a list of airports in Papua New Guinea, sorted by location.

Papua New Guinea, officially the Independent State of Papua New Guinea, is a country in Oceania, occupying the eastern half of the island of New Guinea and numerous offshore islands (the western portion of the island is a part of the Indonesian provinces of Papua and West Papua). It is located in the southwestern Pacific Ocean, in a region defined since the early 19th century as Melanesia. The capital is Port Moresby.

The country has 22 province-level divisions: 20 provinces, one autonomous region (Bougainville) and the National Capital District. Each province has one or more districts, and each district has one or more local level government (LLG) areas.

== Airports ==
Airport names shown in bold indicate the airport has scheduled service on commercial airlines.

Location served	Province	ICAO	IATA	Airport name	Coordinates
**Scheduled service**					
Alotau	Milne Bay	AYGN	GUR	**Gurney Airport**	10°18.7′S 150°20.35′E
Awaba	Western	AYAW	AWB	**Awaba Airport**	08°00.86′S 142°45.06′E
Baimuru	Gulf	AYBA	VMU	**Baimuru Airport**	07°29.69′S 144°49.36′E
Balimo	Western	AYBM	OPU	**Balimo Airport**	08°03.07′S 142°56.42′E
Bosset	Western	AYET	BOT	**Bosset Airport**	07°14.45′S 141°05.54′E
Buka	Bougainville	AYBK	BUA	**Buka Airport**	05°25.29′S 154°40.49′E
Bulolo	Morobe	AYBU	BUL	**Bulolo Airport**	07°13.05′S 146°38.92′E
Daru	Western	AYDU	DAU	**Daru Airport**	09°05.25′S 143°12.5′E
Efogi	Central	AYEF	EFG	Efogi Airport	09°09.34′S 147°39.60′E
Fane	Central	AYFA	FNE	Fane Airport	08°33.07′S 147°05.11′E
Goroka	Eastern Highlands	AYGA	GKA	**Goroka Airport**	06°04.9′S 145°23.45′E
Hoskins	West New Britain	AYHK	HKN	**Hoskins Airport** (Kimbe Airport)	05°27.62′S 150°24.06′E
Itokama	Oro (Northern)	AYIK	ITK	**Itokama Airport**	09°12.01′S 148°15.88′E
Kagi	Central	AYKQ	KGW	**Kagi Airport**	09°08.22′S 147°40.2′E
Kamusi	Gulf	AYKS	KUY	**Kamusi Airport**	07°25.39′S 143°07.26′E
Kavieng	New Ireland	AYKV	KVG	**Kavieng Airport**	02°34.52′S 150°49.05′E
Kerema	Gulf	AYKM	KMA	**Kerema Airport**	07°57.9′S 145°46.22′E
Kieta	Bougainville	AYIQ	KIE	**Kieta Aropa Airport**	06°18.2′S 155°43.4′E
Kikori	Gulf	AYKK	KRI	**Kikori Airport**	07°25.52′S 144°14.87′E
Kiunga	Western	AYKI	UNG	**Kiunga Airport**	06°07.45′S 141°17.15′E
Kokoda	Oro (Northern)	AYKO	KKD	Kokoda Airport	08°53.38′S 147°43.8′E
Kunaye / Londolovit	New Ireland	AYKY	LNV	**Lihir Island Airport** (Kunaye / Londolovit)	03°02.57′S 152°37.64′E
Kundiawa	Simbu (Chimbu)	AYCH	CMU	**Chimbu Airport**	06°01.75′S 144°58.07′E
Lae	Morobe	AYNZ	LAE	**Lae Nadzab Airport**	06°34.27′S 146°43.54′E
Lake Murray	Western	AYLM	LMY	**Lake Murray Airport**	07°00.49′S 141°29.54′E
Lorengau	Manus	AYMO	MAS	**Momote Airport**	02°03.51′S 147°25.26′E
Losuia, Kiriwina Island	Milne Bay	AYKA	LSA	**Losuia Airport** (Kiriwina Airport)	08°30.65′S 151°05′E
Madang	Madang	AYMD	MAG	**Madang Airport**	05°12.6′S 145°47.22′E
Manari (Manare)	Central	AYMA	MRM	**Manari Airport**	09°11.53′S 147°37.25′E
Mendi	Southern Highlands	AYMN	MDU	**Mendi Airport**	06°08.96′S 143°39.36′E
Milei	Central	AYEI		**Milei Airport**	09°04.81′S 147°36.17′E
Misima Island	Milne Bay	AYMS	MIS	**Misima Airport**	10°41.44′S 152°50.13′E
Moro	Southern Highlands	AYMR	MXH	**Moro Airport**	06°21.75′S 143°13.86′E
Mount Hagen	Western Highlands	AYMH	HGU	**Mount Hagen Airport** (Kagamuga Airport)	05°49.84′S 144°17.99′E
Nomad River	Western	AYNR	NOM	**Nomad River Airport**	06°17.62′S 142°13.98′E
Obo	Western	AYOB	OBX	**Obo Airport**	07°35.43′S 141°19.34′E
Ononge	Central	AYQQ	ONB	**Ononge Airport**	08°40.49′S 147°15.66′E
Popondetta	Oro (Northern)	AYGR	PNP	**Girua Airport** (Popondetta Airport)	08°48.35′S 148°18.41′E
Port Moresby	National Capital District	AYPY	POM	**Jacksons International Airport** (Port Moresby)	09°27.27′S 147°12.85′E
Rabaul / Kokopo	East New Britain	AYTK	RAB	**Tokua Airport** (Rabaul Airport)	04°20.49′S 152°22.67′E
Sasereme	Gulf	AYSS	TDS	**Sasereme Airport**	07°37′22″S 142°52′8″E
Suki	Western	AYSU	SKC	**Suki Airport**	08°02.97′S 141°43.5′E
Tabubil	Western	AYTB	TBG	**Tabubil Airport**	05°16.67′S 141°13.56′E
Tapini	Central	AYTI	TPI	**Tapini Airport**	08°21.38′S 146°59.11′E
Tari	Hela	AYTA	TIZ	**Tari Airport**	05°50.66′S 142°56.8′E
Tufi	Oro (Northern)	AYTU	TFI	**Tufi Airport**	09°04.64′S 149°19.16′E
Vanimo	Sandaun (West Sepik)	AYVN	VAI	**Vanimo Airport**	02°41.29′S 141°17.87′E
Wabo	Gulf	AYWB	WAO	**Wabo Airport**	07°00′S 145°04′E
Wanigela	Oro (Northern)	AYWG	AGL	**Wanigela Airport**	09°20.34′S 149°09.42′E
Wapenamanda	Enga	AYWD	WBM	**Wapenamanda Airport**	05°38.26′S 143°53.52′E
Wewak	East Sepik	AYWK	WWK	**Wewak Airport**	03°35.1′S 143°40.05′E
Wipim	Western	AYXP	WPM	Wipim Airport	08°47.36′S 142°52.86′E
Woitape	Central	AYWT	WTP	**Woitape Airport**	08°32.86′S 147°15.12′E
**Other airports/airfields**					
Abau	Central		ABW	Abau Airport	
Agaun	Milne Bay	AYAG	AUP	Agaun Airport	09°55.85′S 149°23.14′E
Aiambak	Western	AYAK	AIH	Aiambak Airport	07°20.55′S 141°15.99′E
Aiome	Gulf	AYAO	AIE	Aiome Airport	5°08′32″S 144°43′55″E
Aiyura	Eastern Highlands	AYAY	AYU	Aiyura Airport	06°20.02′S 145°53.98′E
Bensbach	Western	AYBH	BSP	Bensbach Airport	08°51.38′S 141°15.36′E
Biangabip	Western	AYBQ	BPK	Biangabip Airport	05°31′35″S 141°44′40″E
Cape Gloucester	West New Britain	AYCG	CGC	Cape Gloucester Airport	05°27′S 148°26.5′E
Finschhafen	Morobe	AYFI	FIN	Finschhafen Airport	06°37.43′S 147°51.19′E
Gasmata	West New Britain	AYGT	GMI	Gasmata Airport	06°16.5′S 150°20′E
Mok	West New Britain	AYMK	MOK	Mok Airport	05°43.812′S 149°3.39′E
Gusap	Morobe	AYGP	GAP	Gusap Airport	06°03′S 145°55.7′E
Haelogo	Central	AYHG	HEO	Haelogo Airport	09°08.25′S 147°35.97′E
Ihu	Gulf	AYIH	IHU	Ihu Airport	07°54.01′S 145°24.01′E
Jacquinot Bay	East New Britain	AYJB	JAQ	Jacquinot Bay Airport	05°39′S 151°30′E
Kandrian	West New Britain	AYKC	KDR	Kandrian Airport	06°12.5′S 149°32.5′E
Karimui-Nomane District	Chimbu	AYRI	KMR	Karimui Airport	06°29′35″S 144°49′31″E
Manguna	East New Britain	AYNG	MFO	Manguna Airport	05°34.95′S 151°47.55′E
Nissan Island	Bougainville	AYIA	IIS	Nissan Island Airport	04°30′S 154°13.5′E
Saidor	Madang	AYSD	SDI	Saidor Airport	05°37.59′S 146°27.5′E
Salamo	Milne Bay		SAM	Salamo Airport	09°40.28′S 150°47.35′E
Samberigi	Southern Highlands	AYSM		Samberigi Airport	06°43.33′S 143°56.12′E
Sangapi	Gulf	AYSK	SGK	Sangapi Airport	05°07′30″S 144°19′23″E
Tadji / Aitape	Sandaun (West Sepik)	AYTJ	TAJ	Tadji Airport (Aitape Airport)	03°11.94′S 142°25.7′E
Talasea	West New Britain	AYVL	TLW	Talasea Airport	05°16.21′S 150°05.32′E
Vivigani, Goodenough Is.	Milne Bay		VIV	Vivigani Airfield	09°18.52′S 150°19.28′E
**Former airports/airfields**					
Lae	Morobe	AYLA		Lae Airfield (closed 1980s)	
Namatanai	New Ireland	AYNX	ATN	Namatanai Airport (closed 2000s)	03°40′S 152°26.5′E
Rabaul	East New Britain	AYRB		Rabaul Airport (destroyed 1994)	

== See also ==
- Air Niugini destinations
- Airlines PNG#Destinations
- Boridi
- Transport in Papua New Guinea
- List of airports by ICAO code: A#AY - Papua New Guinea
- Wikipedia:WikiProject Aviation/Airline destination lists: Oceania#Papua New Guinea
- List of the busiest airports in Oceania
