= Bensbach =

Bensbach may refer to:

- Bensbach Airport in Papua New Guinea
- Bensbach River in Papua New Guinea
- Bensbach's bird-of-paradise
