= ABW =

ABW, or abw, may refer to:

== Arts and media ==
- ABW, a 2001 album by Addis Black Widow
- ABW (TV station), the Australian Broadcasting Corporation's Perth TV station
- Australian Bird Watcher, an ornithological journal

== Places ==
- Abau Airport in Central Province, Papua New Guinea (IATA airport code ABW)
- Abbey Wood railway station in London, UK (National Rail code ABW)
- Aruba (ISO 3166-1 alpha-3 country code ABW)

== Technology ==
- Abandonware, software no longer supported by its owner
- AbiWord, word processor
- Advanced Brake Warning, in vehicle safety systems

== Other uses ==
- Pal language, a Papuan language of Papua New Guinea (ISO 639-3 code "abw")
- Activity Based Working, workplace strategy that provides people with a choice of settings for their work activities
- AirBridgeCargo, a Russian cargo airline
- Agencja Bezpieczeństwa Wewnętrznego, the Polish internal security agency, also known as ISA
- Alcohol by weight, used by some brewers instead of Alcohol by volume (ABV)
