= Chimbu =

Chimbu can refer to

- the Simbu Province (formerly Chimbu) of Papua New Guinea
- Kuman language (New Guinea), also known as Simbu or Chimbu
- Chimbu people, also known as Simbu or Kuman
- Chimbu River
- Chimbu Airport in Kundiawa, Papua New Guinea.
