= Aiome Airport =

Airport in Papua New Guinea

- IATA: AIE; ICAO: AYAO

Summary
- Airport type: Public
- Location: Aiome, Papua New Guinea
- Elevation AMSL: 350 ft (110 m)
- Coordinates: 5°8.55′S 144°43.88′E

Map
- Location of airport in Papua New Guinea

Runways
Direction	Length		Surface
Direction	m	ft	Surface
01/19	1,000	3,281
- Source: PNG Airstrip Guide

Aiome Airport (IATA: AIE, ICAO: AYAO) is an airport in Aiome, Papua New Guinea.

== Airlines and destinations ==
PNG Air connects Aiome Airport to Baimuru Airport, Kikori Airport, and Port Moresby International Airport.
