= Samberigi =

Samberigi may refer to:

- Samberigi, Papua New Guinea, a town in the Southern Highlands of Papua New Guinea; see List of cities and towns in Papua New Guinea
- Samberigi Airport
- Samberigi language
