= December 1979 =

Month of 1979

| << | December 1979 | | | | | >> |
| Su | Mo | Tu | We | Th | Fr | Sa |
| | | | | | | 1 |
| 2 | 3 | 4 | 5 | 6 | 7 | 8 |
| 9 | 10 | 11 | 12 | 13 | 14 | 15 |
| 16 | 17 | 18 | 19 | 20 | 21 | 22 |
| 23 | 24 | 25 | 26 | 27 | 28 | 29 |
| 30 | 31 |

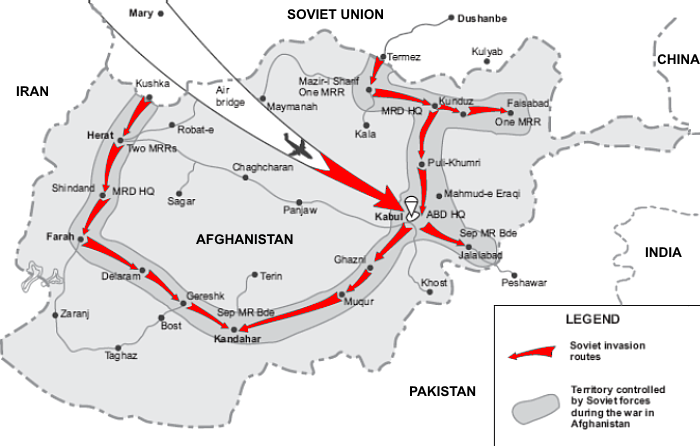
December 24, 1979: Soviet Union invades Afghanistan, begins 9 years of war

The following events occurred in December 1979 in:

== December 1, 1979 (Saturday) ==
- The Southern Illinois University Edwardsville (SIUE) Cougars won the NCAA Division I college soccer championship in the U.S., defeating the Clemson Tigers, 3 to 2, in Tampa.
- Danny Shouse, an American basketball player in the Icelandic professional basketball league scored 100 points for his Ármann team of Reykjavík in a game against Skallagrímur in the city of Borgarnes.
- Born: Richard James, Jamaican sprinter; in Boston Beach, Jamaica

== December 2, 1979 (Sunday) ==
- The U.S. Embassy in Libya was stormed by a crowd of 2,000 demonstrators in Tripoli, who knocked down the doors and set fires that caused damage to lower floors, but the American personnel inside were able to escape safely.
- Elections were held in Portugal for the 250 seats of the unicameral Assembly of the Republic. Led by Francisco de Sá Carneiro, the Aliança Democrática, a coalition of three conservative parties, captured 115 seats and soon added more from other parties for a 128-seat majority.
- Two days of voting began in Iran in a referendum on approval of the new Islamic constitution.
- Two days of voting began in Iceland for the 40 seats of the lower house and the 20 seats of the upper house of Iceland's parliament, the Althing, with participation by about 127,000 voters. The result was rejection of the minority government of Prime Minister Benedikt Gröndal and a new government would be formed by Gunnar Thoroddsen of the Progressive Party.
- Born: Yvonne Catterfeld, German singer and actress; in Erfurt, East Germany

== December 3, 1979 (Monday) ==
- Eleven people attending a rock concert were trampled to death during a crowd rush for unreserved seats before The Who rock concert at the Riverfront Coliseum in Cincinnati. The concert took place as scheduled, 45 minutes later, after coliseum officials determined that the stampede— of people forced up against a locked door— had taken place outside of the arena seating area. Those killed ranged in age from 15 to 24 years old. Lead singer Roger Daltrey said in an interview afterward, "I don't think you can point any fingers. They just tried to funnel 17,000 people into three doorways and that was mad."
- The United States dollar exchange rate with the Deutsche Mark fell to 1.7079 DM, the all-time low so far; this record would not broken until November 5, 1987.
- The Ayatollah Ruhollah Khomeini became the first Supreme Leader of Iran.
- Born:
  - Robert "Robby" Mook, American political strategist and campaign manager for Hillary's Clinton's 2016 campaign; in Sharon, Vermont
  - Daniel Bedingfield, New Zealand born British singer; in Auckland
  - Tiffany Haddish, American comedian and Grammy Award winner; in Los Angeles
- Died: Dhyan Chand, 74, Indian field hockey champion and Olympic gold medalist

== December 4, 1979 (Tuesday) ==
- U.S. President Jimmy Carter announced his intent to run for re-election in the 1980 U.S. presidential elections, and stated that Vice President Walter Mondale would again be his running mate.
- The Hastie fire in Kingston upon Hull in England, killed three boys and began the hunt for Bruce George Peter Lee, the UK's most prolific killer.

== December 5, 1979 (Wednesday) ==
- The government of Israel released Bassam Shakaa, the Palestinian mayor of the city of Nablus, 24 days after arresting him on November 11 and ordering his deportation. In the wake of the arrest, the other mayors of Palestinian cities in the occupied West Bank and the Gaza Strip had resigned in protest and begun a campaign of civil disobedience against the Israeli government. "Never before in the 12 years of Israeli occupation have Palestinian leaders acted in such unison," a reporter for The New York Times wrote, "and never before have they been able to effect such a dramatic reversal by the Israeli military authorities."
- A tentative agreement on the future of the white-ruled southern African nation of Rhodesia was reached between the British Government and representatives of the Patriotic Front, an alliance of anti-government rebel groups.
- Jack Lynch announced his resignation as Prime Minister of the Republic of Ireland.
- Died: Sonia Delaunay, 94, French design artist and co-founder of the Orphism movement

== December 6, 1979 (Thursday) ==
- Choi Kyu-hah was overwhelmingly approved as President of South Korea by a vote of 2,465 to 84 in a special electoral college assembled in Seoul to name a successor to Park Chung Hee, who had been assassinated on October 26. Choi, a former prime minister, had been serving as acting president until an election could be held.
- At least 14 people were killed and 60 others injured in Spain when an unmanned train crashed into a passenger train that had been halted near Les Franqueses del Vallès. Officials of the state-owned company Renfe Operadora had switched off the electrical power to prevent the passenger train from getting closer, while trying to stop the crewless train that had rolled out of a station and down a steep grade, and "efforts to stop the runaway train by blocking the line or switching it to a siding failed."
- Sixteen people were killed and 10 injured in Argentina in an early morning fire at the Rilke II nightclub in Rosario.
- The first elections for the House of Assembly of Saint Vincent and the Grenadines since the Caribbean nation's independence took place, as the Saint Vincent Labour Party of Prime Minister Milton Cato won 11 of 13 seats. The next day, Cato declared a state of emergency after a group of armed rebels temporarily seized the airport and the police station on one of the Grenadines, Union Island.
- The world premiere of Star Trek: The Motion Picture was held at the Smithsonian Institution in Washington, D.C., before going into nationwide release in the U.S. and Canada the next day. New York Times critic Vincent Canby commented that the title was superfluous because "I doubt anyone who sees it could possibly confuse this film with those shards of an earlier, simpler, cheaper television era."
- Born: Stephenie LaGrossa, American reality show contestant, in Philadelphia, Pennsylvania

== December 7, 1979 (Friday) ==
- South Korea's President Choi Kyu-hah revoked "Presidential Emergency Decree Number 9", which had been in place since 1974 when it was implemented by then-president Park Chung Hee. Later in the day, the South Korean government released 68 dissidents who had been imprisoned for violating the decree against criticism of the Park government. Foremost among the dissidents released was Kim Dae-jung, who would later become President of South Korea in 1998.
- The Satcom III communications satellite became useless, 12 hours after its launch the night before, when an attempt to place it into a permanent geosynchronous orbit failed. At 1:57 p.m. Eastern time (1857 UTC), technicians at the RCA Corporation sent the command to fire a small engine to place the $20,000,000 Satcom III to a point 22,300 miles (35,900 km) above the Pacific Ocean, then lost communication with the craft. With capacity for 24 relay channels, Satcom III was set to receive and forward transmissions from various companies to cable service providers.
- Born:
  - Sara Bareilles, American singer-songwriter; in Eureka, California
  - Eric Bauza, Canadian voice actor; in Scarborough, Ontario (d. 2026)
  - Jennifer Carpenter, American TV actress; in Louisville, Kentucky
- Died:
  - Cecilia Payne-Gaposchkin, 79, British-born American astronomer known for her discovery of the composition of stars
  - Shahriar Shafiq, 34, Iranian prince and former Iranian Navy captain, was shot and killed in Paris while walking along the Rue de la Villa Dupont. Shafiq, a nephew of the recently deposed Shah of Iran and son of the Shah's twin sister, Princess Ashraf, was returning home from grocery shopping when a gunman walked up to him and fired two 9mm bullets into his head. The Islamic Revolutionary Tribunal, which had sentenced Shafiq to death in absentia, took responsibility for the assassination.

== December 8, 1979 (Saturday) ==
- The government of Indonesia released 2,045 prisoners who had been detained since an unsuccessful coup d'état attempt in 1965 against the regime of President Sukarno. Another 61 political prisoners, described as by the Indonesian government as "hard core Communists", were held for trial to take place in 1980.
- The U.S. state of Louisiana elected their first Republican governor in more than a century, as U.S. Representative David C. Treen defeated Democrat Louis Lambert in a runoff election. At the time, registered Democratic Party voters outnumbered registered Republicans by a ratio of 22 to 1, but Lambert's opponents in the Democratic primary had endorsed Treen in the runoff election.
- Born: Ingrid Michaelson, American singer-songwriter, in New York City
- Died: Robert Hocq, 62, French business executive who purchased and revived the ailing Cartier jewelry firm, was killed while crossing the street outside of his office in Paris.

== December 9, 1979 (Sunday) ==
- The Arab nation of Libya, led by Muammar Gaddafi, broke relations with the Palestinian Liberation Organization (PLO) and closed its bureau in Tripoli, after PLO officials resisted Gaddafi's insistence that the Palestinian representatives rely predominantly on guerrilla warfare to achieve their goals against Israel. The break came after Gaddafi had called on Palestinian commandos in the more radical Popular Front for the Liberation of Palestine (PFLP) to destroy the Suez Canal in Egypt and to wreck Egyptian oil fields in retaliation for Egypt's peace accords with Israel.

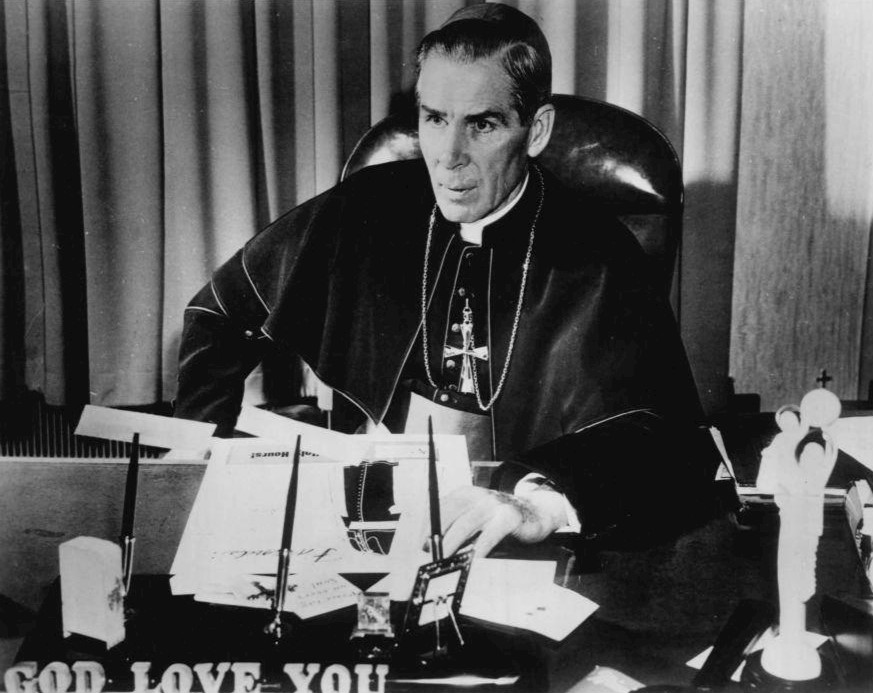
Bishop Sheen on his program Life Is Worth Living

- Died: Fulton J. Sheen, 84, American Roman Catholic Archbishop and television evangelist

== December 10, 1979 (Monday) ==
- The Kaohsiung Incident took place in Taiwan when police in the city of Kaohsiung blocked a rally in observation of the United Nations' Human Rights Day and a crowd of about 10,000 protesters. Eight opposition leaders, associated with the political magazine Formosa, were arrested. At the time, the Kuomintang was the only legal political party in Taiwan, formally the Republic of China.
- For the first time since the beginning of the Iran Hostage Crisis, one of the U.S. Embassy personnel in detention was allowed to be interviewed by the American press. U.S. Marine Sergeant William Gallegos, a guard at the besieged embassy in Tehran, was selected by his student captors to be questioned by George Lewis and Fred Francis of NBC Nightly News, and said that "The students here have been really good to us," adding "It's hard to believe, I know. We haven't been asked any questions as to what we're doing here, what really our job was. All of us can see each other. Everybody's O.K."
- South Africa's white minority government partially relaxed some of its regulations under its apartheid policy of racial segregation, declaring that private businesses such as hospitals and drive-in theaters no longer had to renew permits allowing the admission of non-White customers.

== December 11, 1979 (Tuesday) ==
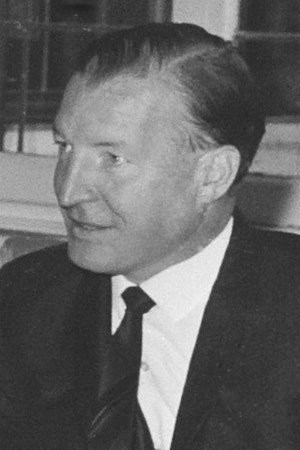
Taoiseach Charles Haughey

- Charles Haughey was elected by the Dáil Éireann (lower house of Ireland's bicameral parliament) as the new Taoiseach, or prime minister, of Ireland to replace Jack Lynch. In a vote along party lines, Haughey, leader of the Fianna Fáil political party, was approved by a margin of 82 to 62, with the opposition coming from the Fine Gael party and its leader, Garret FitzGerald.
- The multi-racial parliament of Zimbabwe Rhodesia voted, 90 to 0, to renounce the 1965 declaration of independence made by the white colonial government that had established the British colony of Southern Rhodesia as an independent nation. The vote was the last legal step to return Southern Rhodesia to colonial status, in conjunction with the ceasefire agreement worked out to end the Rhodesian Civil War, and for Lord Christopher Soames to become the first British Governor of Southern Rhodesia in more than 14 years.
- Born: Rider Strong, American TV actor and film director; in San Francisco
- Died: James J. Gibson, 75, American psychologist known for his theory of ecological psychology in visual perception

== December 12, 1979 (Wednesday) ==
- The NATO Double-Track Decision was made as members of the North Atlantic Treaty Organization decided to propose to the Warsaw Pact nations a mutual limitation of medium-range ballistic missiles and intermediate-range ballistic missiles combined. The offer was coupled with the threat that, in case of disagreement, NATO would deploy more middle-range nuclear weapons in Western Europe. This followed the so-called "Euromissile Crisis".
- The 8.2 M_{w} Tumaco earthquake shook Colombia and Ecuador with a maximum Mercalli intensity of IX (Violent), killing at least 300 people and generating a large tsunami. The 10 foot (3.0 m) high tsunami reportedly swept away the people in six fishing villages along the Colombian coast.
- South Korean Army Major General Chun Doo-hwan, Chief of Army Security Command, ordered the unauthorized arrest of the Army Chief of Staff, General Jeong Seung-hwa and several other generals after alleging their involvement in the assassination of ex-President Park Chung Hee. General Jeong's bodyguards engaged in a gunbattle with Chun's soldiers at the Defense Ministry headquarters and three people were killed, with four others seriously wounded before Jeong was taken into custody. General Chun followed with a demand that Prime Minister Shin fill the vacancies, left by the arrest of 16 senior officers, with men of Chun's choice.
- The unrecognized state of Zimbabwe Rhodesia returned to British control and resumed using the name Southern Rhodesia.

== December 13, 1979 (Thursday) ==
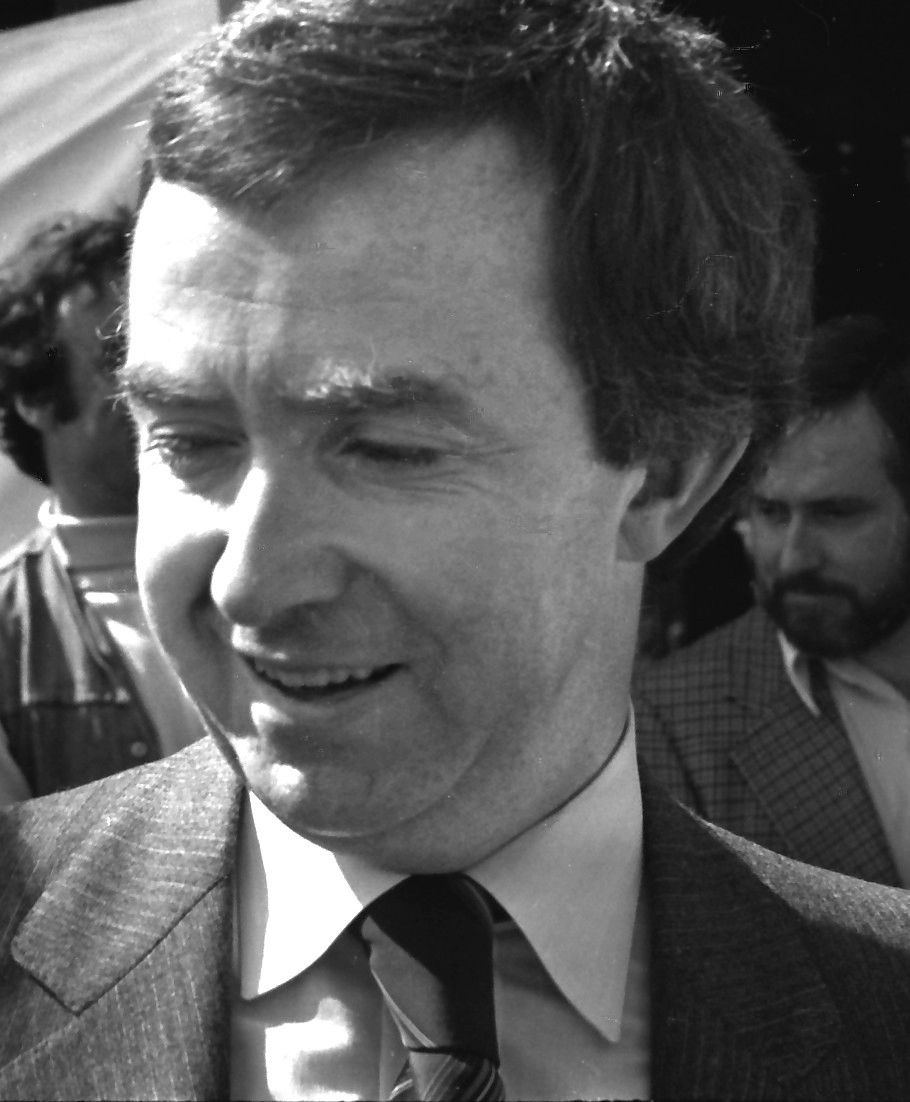
Prime Minister Clark

- The Progressive Conservative Party government of Canada's Prime Minister Joe Clark, installed less than seven months earlier, lost a vote of no confidence in the House of Commons by six votes, 139 to 133, after "its failure to make good on its promises to cut taxes and stimulate the economy." Clark then announced that he would ask Governor General Edward Schreyer to call for new elections to be held in February. The vote came a day after the government excise tax on a gallon of fuel was increased another 18 cents per gallon immediately as a means of curbing energy use, and an announcement that a 12 cent increase would be added on January 1.
- Shin Hyun-hwak became the new Prime Minister of South Korea after being nominated by President (and former Prime Minister) Choi Kyu-hah and confirmed by the National Assembly.
- Died: Jon Hall (stage name for Charles Locher), 64, American film and television actor known for the series Ramar of the Jungle

== December 14, 1979 (Friday) ==
- East Germany completed a 68-day amnesty program that it had started on October 7, 1979, the 30th anniversary of the creation of the German Democratic Republic from the Soviet occupation zone of Germany. The Communist government announced that during the amnesty period, 21,928 prisoners, or more than two-thirds of the incarcerated population, had been set free. Excluded from consideration were "murderers, war criminals, people convicted of brutal crimes and those jailed under international agreements".
- Born:
  - Chris Cheng, American marksman and sport shooter; in Mission Viejo, California
  - Michael Owen, English soccer football striker and national team member; in Chester, Cheshire

== December 15, 1979 (Saturday) ==
- The former Shah of Iran, Mohammad Reza Pahlavi, quietly departed the United States after the Republic of Panama agreed to accept him. The Shah and his family were flown to Contadora Island, one of the Pearl Islands roughly 35 miles (56 km) from the Panamanian coast.
- In a harbinger of the failure of the European Space Agency's plans to launch a rocket into orbit, a test-firing of the Ariane rocket's engines ended abruptly with an automatic shutdown.
- Born: Adam Brody, American television and film actor; in San Diego
- Died: Ethel Lackie, 72, American swimmer and 1924 Olympic gold medalist

== December 16, 1979 (Sunday) ==
- The United States ended its embargo against Rhodesia for imports and exports after 14 years.
- Born:
  - Trevor Immelman, South African professional golfer and 2008 Masters Tournament champion; in Cape Town
  - Daniel Narcisse, French team handball player and national team member; in Saint-Denis, Réunion island
- Died: Vagif Mustafazadeh, 39, Soviet Azerbaijani jazz musician

== December 17, 1979 (Monday) ==
- American film stuntman Stan Barrett became the first person to travel faster than the speed of sound on land, reaching Mach 1.01 when he attained a maximum velocity of 739.666 miles per hour (1,190.377 km/h) in a 60,000 horsepower rocket-powered vehicle on Rogers Dry Lake at California's Edwards Air Force Base. Under conditions at the time, with a temperature of 20 °F (−7 °C), the speed of sound was 731.9 miles per hour (1,177.9 km/h).
- Born: Jaimee Foxworth, American TV actress; in Belleville, Illinois

== December 18, 1979 (Tuesday) ==
- The Roman Catholic Church issued a censure against a liberal Swiss theologian and priest, Father Hans Küng, for his continued questioning of "age old tenets of the Roman Catholic faith." Father Küng, a professor at Germany's University of Tübingen, was named specifically in a Vatican declaration written in Latin and signed by Cardinal Franjo Šeper, Prefect of the Congregation for the Doctrine of the Faith, declaring that "this sacred congregation by reason of its duty is constrained to declare that Professor Hans Küng, in his writings, has departed from the integral truth of Catholic faith, and therefore he can no longer be considered a Catholic theologian nor function as such in a teaching role."
- The Black Hole, the first Walt Disney Productions film to ever receive a parental guidance (PG) rating, premiered in the United Kingdom (with an "A" rating) and was released in the United States and Canada three days later. With a total budget of $26 million for production and promotion, the film was the most expensive produced by the Disney studios up to that time.

== December 19, 1979 (Wednesday) ==
- The United States Senate followed the previous approval of the U.S. House of Representatives and voted, 53 to 44, to pass the Chrysler Corporation Loan Guarantee Act of 1979 to authorize the financial rescue of the ailing U.S. automobile manufacturer. U.S. President Carter signed the bill into law on January 7 to authorize a 1.5 billion dollar government loan.
- Mudar Badran resigned as Prime Minister of Jordan and was replaced by Abdelhamid Sharaf, a former Jordanian Ambassador to the U.S. Badran, though only 40, died of a heart attack less than eight months later, on July 4, 1980.
- Siegfried Haag, a former lawyer and member of the Red Army Faction terrorist group in West Germany, was sentenced to 15 years in prison. He would be released seven years later because of illness.
- The Academy Award-winning film Kramer vs. Kramer, starring Dustin Hoffman and Meryl Streep as a divorcing couple fighting over custody of their child, was released nationwide in the United States. New York Times critic Vincent Canby described it as "one of those rare American movies that never have to talk importantly and self-consciously to let you know that it has to do with many more things than are explicitly stated."

== December 20, 1979 (Thursday) ==
- The first advanced maneuverable reentry vehicle ballistic missile, the AMaRV, was launched as the payload of a U.S. Minuteman I and was capable of autonomously adjusting its trajectory during its descent in order to reach its target.
- A military court in South Korea sentenced seven men, led by former Korean Central Intelligence Agency director Kim Jae-kyu, to be executed for the October 26 assassination of President Park Chung Hee. Kim, who shot President Park to death during a banquet, told the court, "I do not wish to beg for my life, as I have found a cause to die for. My motive was a wish to establish a foundation for peaceful changes of government in the future."

== December 21, 1979 (Friday) ==
- Documents for a ceasefire in the Rhodesian Civil War were signed at the Lancaster House in London, to take effect on December 28. Bishop Abel Muzorewa, the Prime Minister of the biracial government that had been elected in Zimbabwe Rhodesia signed on behalf of the colonial government, while Robert Mugabe of the Zimbabwe African National Union and Joshua Nkomo of the Zimbabwe African People's Union signed for the Patriotic Front guerrilla group.
- For the first time since the founding of the People's Republic of China, the Communist government permitted the public ceremonies for consecration of a religious leader, as Bishop Michael Fu Tieshan was certified as the Roman Catholic Bishop of Beijing by the Communist government. Bishop Fu, leader of the government-approved Catholic Patriotic Association, was consecrated by eight Roman Catholic bishops from other dioceses, all of whom wore "traditional church vestments". The ceremony was not recognized by the Vatican, however, since Fu was elected by his parishioners rather than selected by the Roman Catholic Church. The Roman Catholic Archdiocese of Beijing would be reactivated by the Vatican in 1989.
- At least 43 bus passengers in the Philippines were killed while traveling home for the Christmas holiday, after the driver missed a detour and drove the vehicle off of a collapsed bridge. The bus, operated by Philippine National Railways (PNR) fell into the Marana River, near Ilagan City, when it reached a concrete bridge whose center span had been washed away by Typhoon Vera.
- The record for most consecutive games played in the National Hockey League, held by Garry Unger of the Atlanta Flames, stopped at 914 in a row when Flames' coach Al MacNeil benched Unger, marking the first time since February 24, 1968, that Unger had not appeared in a scheduled NHL game. The benching came on the same day that a reporter for the local Atlanta Constitution spoke of Unger's "selfish reputation" and wrote that the mark "seems only to dig up more talk about his lack of team play each game the streak is mentioned." Unger's record would stand for seven more years until December 26, 1986, when surpassed by Doug Jarvis of the Hartford Whalers.

== December 22, 1979 (Saturday) ==
- In the U.S., the acquisition of National Airlines company by Pan American World Airways was approved by President Jimmy Carter upon recommendation of the Civil Aeronautics Board, bringing an end to the 45-year old airline brand. All of National's flights and aircraft were re-branded as Pan Am, which became the fourth-largest air carrier in the U.S.

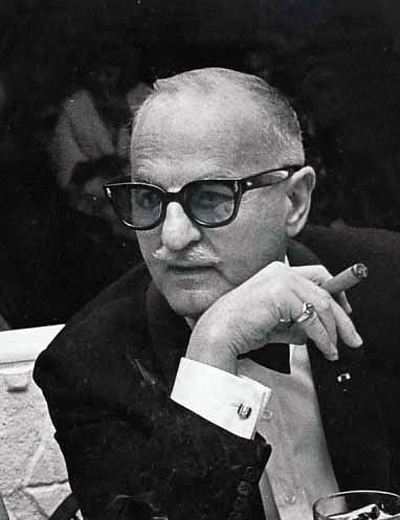
Zanuck

- Died: Darryl F. Zanuck, 77, American film producer and studio executive, winner of three Academy Awards for Best Picture (for How Green Was My Valley, Gentleman's Agreement and All About Eve)

== December 23, 1979 (Sunday) ==
- Only four people survived the crash of a Turkish Airlines flight that killed 41 people during its approach to Ankara at the end of its trip from Samsun. The Fokker F-28 jet struck a hillside near the village of Kuyumcuköy after deviating from its course.
- All 16 people on board a Douglas Airways GAF Nomad airplane were killed in Papua New Guinea when the two-engine propeller-driven aircraft over-ran the runway at the airport in Manari and plunged down a steep embankment. The flight had originated in Port Moresby.
- The highest aerial tramway in Europe, the Klein Matterhorn, opened.
- Born:
  - Jacqueline Bracamontes, Mexican beauty pageant titlist and actress; in Guadalajara
  - Kenny Miller, Scottish soccer football striker and national team member; in Edinburgh
- Died: Peggy Guggenheim, 81, American modern art collector

== December 24, 1979 (Monday) ==
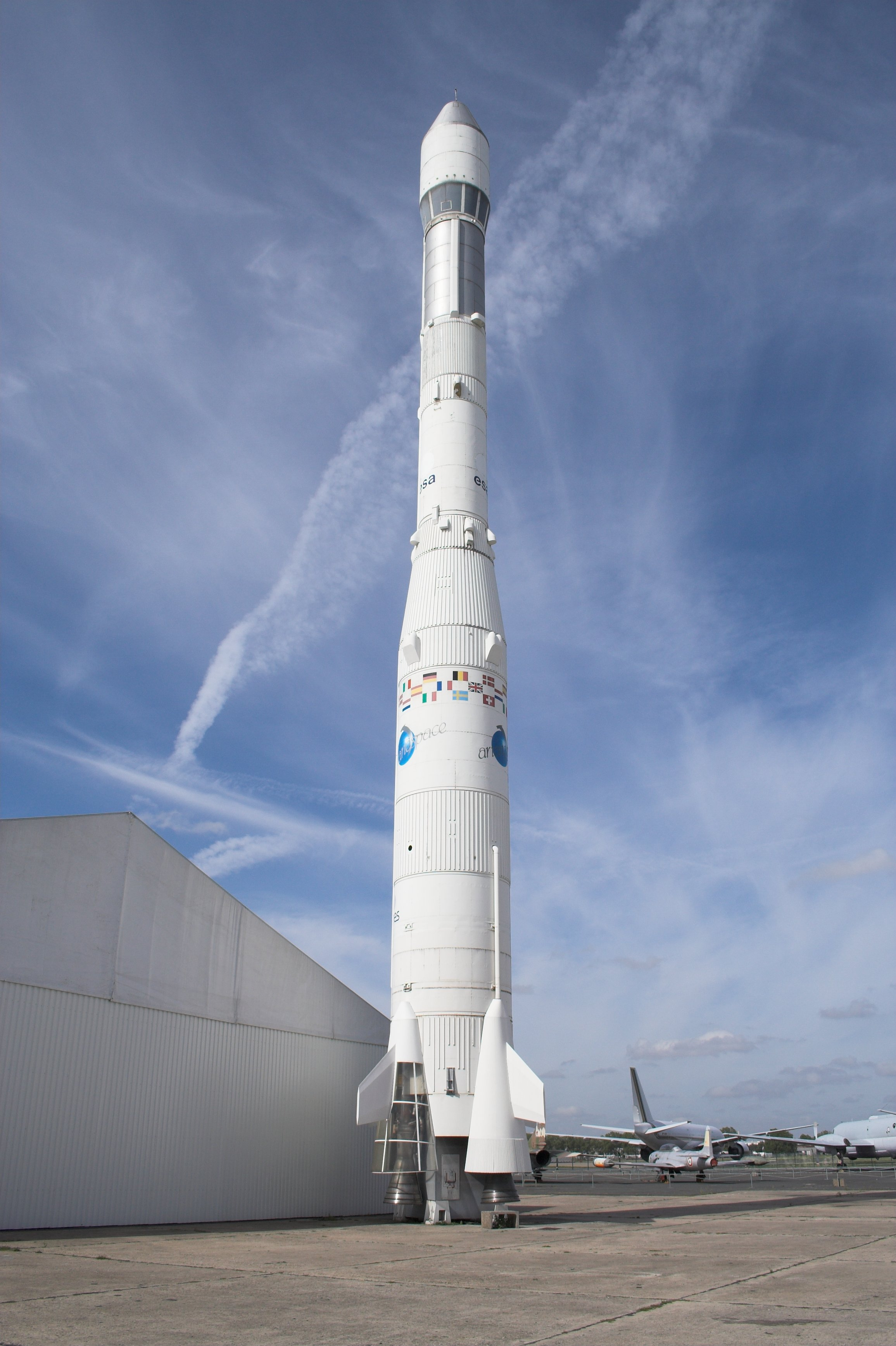
A replica of the Ariane 1 rocket on display

- The European Space Agency, financed primarily by France and nine other Western European nations, placed a rocket into Earth orbit for the first time as the unmanned Ariane 1 was launched from the Guiana Space Centre near Kourou in French Guiana.
- The Soviet Union invaded Afghanistan when 6,000 combat troops of the 40th Soviet Army were flown into the Asian nation, to prepare to replace PDPA general secretary Hafizullah Amin, who had fallen out of favor with Soviet leadership. Within three days, the troops invaded the capital city of Kabul to carry out a bloody coup d'état to kill Amin and replace him with Babrak Karmal. The invasion began a war that would last for more than nine years.
- Died: Rudi Dutschke, 39, West German political activist, from injuries sustained in a 1968 shooting. Known as "Red Rudi", Dutschke, who had been shot in the head on April 11, 1968, suffered frequent seizures and drowned in a bathtub while visiting friends in the city of Aarhus in Denmark.

== December 25, 1979 (Tuesday) ==
- All 28 crewmen of the Taiwanese freighter Lee Wang Zin were killed when the 714-foot (218 m) Taiwanese ore freighter capsized off the coast of the Canadian province of British Columbia.
- The U.S. Embassy hostages in Iran were allowed by their captors to have Christmas services, as three U.S. clergymen and a French-born Algerian archbishop spent five hours with the hostages.
- Died: Joan Blondell (Rose Joan Bluestein), 73, American film and television actress

== December 26, 1979 (Wednesday) ==
- In Rhodesia, 96 Patriotic Front guerrillas entered the capital Salisbury to monitor a ceasefire scheduled to begin December 28.
- Born: Dmitriy Vassiliev, Russian ski jumper; in Ufa, Bashkir ASSR, Soviet Union
- Died:
  - Helmut Hasse, 81, German mathematician for whom 12 mathematical functions are named, including the Hasse diagram, the Hasse norm theorem, and Hasse's theorem on elliptic curves
  - Josiah Tongogara, 41, Zimbabwean guerrilla leader of the Zimbabwe African National Liberation Army, the military wing of Robert Mugabe's Zimbabwe African National Union, was reportedly killed in an automobile accident in Mozambique while on his way to Rhodesia supervise the duties assigned to his troops as a part of the recent ceasefire. Tongogara was a passenger in a car that was driving him from Maputo to his headquarters in Chimoio, where he would have then crossed the border into Umtali. Near the Mozambican city of Massinga, Tongogara's vehicle crashed into a truck that had been abandoned on the road.

== December 27, 1979 (Thursday) ==
- Hafizullah Amin, who had been the Communist leader of Afghanistan's People's Democratic Party, and General Secretary of the People's Democratic Party of Afghanistan (PDPA), since September 14, was overthrown in a coup d'état, put on trial before a revolutionary tribunal for "crimes against the state", and executed. Former Prime Minister Babrak Karmal, who had been in exile in Czechoslovakia, flew into Kabul to become the new Party General Secretary and leader. The coup came with the support of Soviet Red Army combat troops who had been flown in to Afghanistan earlier in the week. Plans to replace Amin had started after the September coup, when Soviet ally Noor Mohammad Taraki had been overthrown and killed. The Soviet press agency TASS broadcast a speech on Radio Kabul declaring that "Today is the breaking of the machine of torture of Amin and his henchmen, wild butchers, usurpers and murderers of tens of thousands of our countrymen, and added that Amin and "his stooges" had been "agents of American imperialism."
- Ten inmates died in a fire at the Lancaster County Jail in Lancaster, South Carolina, and eight more were injured before the blaze was extinguished. The fire started at 6:00 in the evening on the second floor of the 150-year-old building that had been designed by famous American architect Robert Mills.
- 26-year-old Richard Keith Jop of Hastings, New York, fell 400 feet (120 m) to his death while standing on the snow-covered edge of the Rim Trail in Grand Canyon National Park.
- Maria de Lourdes Pintasilgo, the first female Prime Minister of Portugal, submitted her resignation to President António Ramalho Eanes, clearing the way for a new government to be formed by election victor Francisco de Sá Carneiro.
- Sam Rutigliano of the Cleveland Browns who took his team to a winning 9–7 record thanks to their amazing miracle finishes and without their star running back Greg Pruitt was named the United Press International AFC Coach of the Year.

== December 28, 1979 (Friday) ==
- A freak accident killed six employees and injured 12 more at the Jones & Laughlin Steel Company, when a ventilation fan suddenly stopped turning and the workers were overcome by carbon monoxide from a blast furnace. Among the dead were people who attempted to close a valve to stop the flow of the deadly gas.
- Jack Pardee of the Washington Redskins who took a hodgepodge team of free agents and trade acquisitions to a 10–6 record and within a few seconds of making it to the NFL Playoffs was named the United Press International NFC coach of the year.
- Born: Rob Stewart, Canadian documentary filmmaker and conservationist; in Toronto, Ontario, Canada (d. 2017)
- Died: Rafael Filiberto Bonnelly, 75, President of the Dominican Republic from 1962 to 1963

== December 29, 1979 (Saturday) ==
- The "State Sponsors of Terrorism List" was introduced by the U.S. Department of State and identified four nations in the Middle East— Syria, Libya, Iraq and South Yemen— as countries subject to diplomatic sanctions for their continuing sponsorship of international terrorism. Syria would remain on the list more than 40 years later; as of 2021, the other nations on the list are Iran, Cuba and North Korea.

== December 30, 1979 (Sunday) ==
- Time magazine announced that it had selected the Ayatollah Khomeini as its "Man of the Year" for 1979, to appear on the cover of its issue dated January 7, 1980, describing him as the individual who "has done the most to change the news, for better or worse." The magazine added that "As the leader of Iran's revolution he gave the 20th century world a frightening lesson in the shattering power of irrationality, of the ease with which terrorism can be adopted as government policy," and that "The revolution that he led to triumph threatens to upset the world balance of power more than any other political event since Hitler's conquest of Europe."
- Born: Flávio Amado, Angolan soccer football striker and national team member; in Luanda

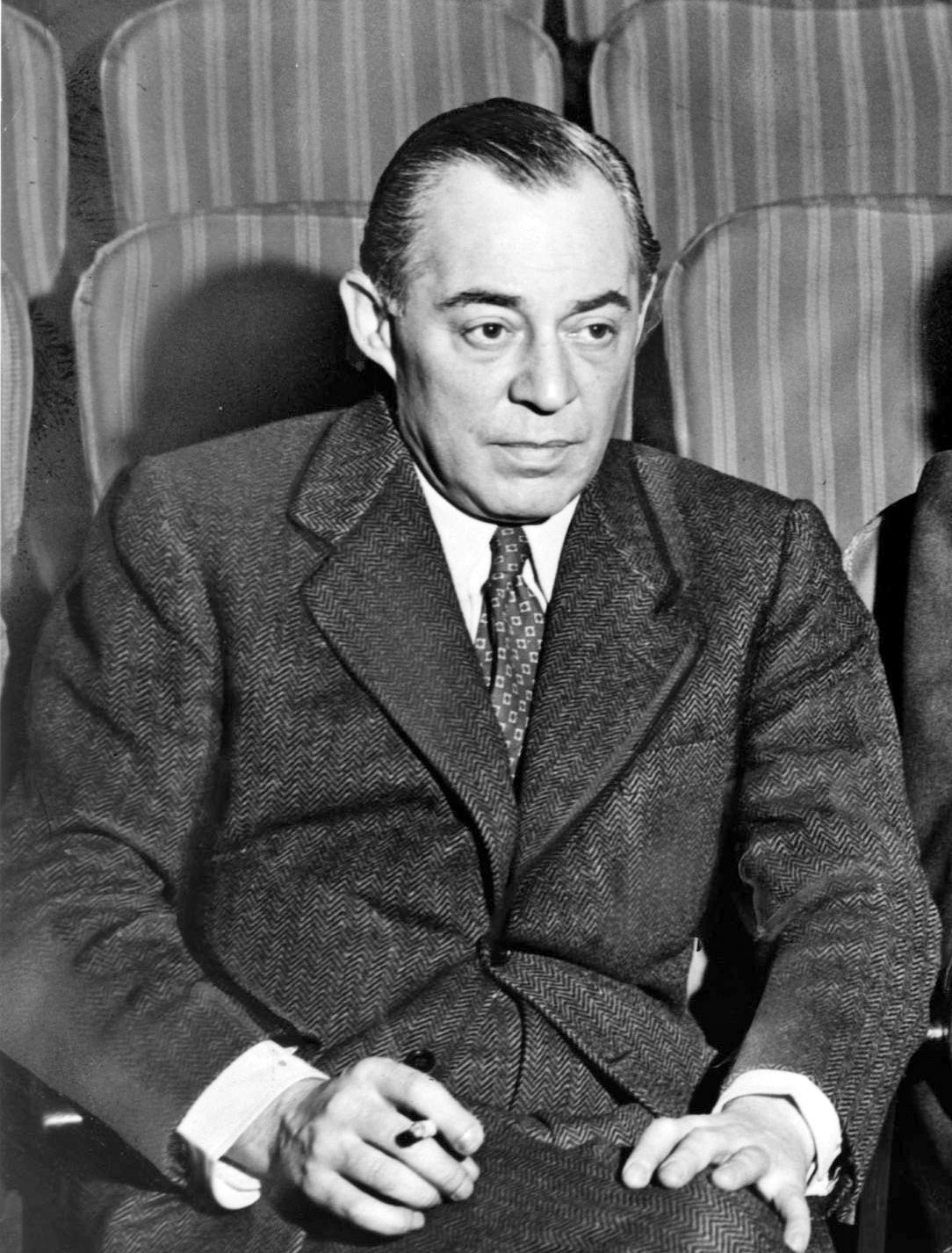
Rodgers

- Died: Richard Rodgers, 77 American musical composer and the first person to win the Tony, Oscar, Grammy and Emmy awards, as well as the Pulitzer Prize; as part of the team of Rodgers and Hart and then Rodgers and Hammerstein, he composed the music for the songs in Oklahoma!, South Pacific, The Sound of Music and other successful musicals

== December 31, 1979 (Monday) ==
- The Eiffel Tower, operated since 1889 as a private business by the Société d'Exploitation de la Tour Eiffel, came under the control of the city of Paris and to a management group of private investors.
- Born:
  - Bob Bryar, American musician, drummer of My Chemical Romance, in Chicago (d. 2024)
  - Elaine Cassidy, Irish TV and film actress; in Raheny, County Dublin
  - Josh Hawley, conservative U.S. Senator (R-Missouri); in Springdale, Arkansas
