= Awaba =

Awaba may refer to:

- Awaba, New South Wales, a suburb of Lake Macquarie in New South Wales, in Australia
- Awaba railway station, New South Wales, a train station of Lake Macquarie in New South Wales, in Australia
- Awaba Airport, an airport in Awaba, in the Western Province of Papua New Guinea
