= Bosset Airport =

Airport in Western, Papua New Guinea

- IATA: BOT; ICAO: AYET

Summary
- Airport type: Public
- Location: Bosset, Papua New Guinea
- Elevation AMSL: 60 ft (18 m)
- Coordinates: 07°14′27″S 141°05′32.4″E

Map
- Location of airport in Papua New Guinea

Runways
Direction	Length		Surface
Direction	m	ft	Surface
01/19	400	1,312
- Source: PNG Airstrip Guide

Bosset Airport (IATA: BOT, ICAO: AYET) is an airfield serving Bosset, a village in the Western province in Papua New Guinea. The airfield is located 289 nautical miles (535 km; 333 mi) west of Port Moresby, the capital and largest city of Papua New Guinea.

== Facilities ==
The airfield resides at an elevation of 60 feet (18 m) above mean sea level. It has one runway designated 01/19 which is 400 metres (1,312 ft) long.

== Airlines and destinations ==
PNG Air connects Bosset Airport to Lake Murray Airport and Obo Airport.
