= Sangapi Airport =

Airport in Madang, Papua New Guinea

- IATA: SGK; ICAO: AYSK; LID: SNI

Summary
- Airport type: Public
- Serves: Sangapi, Madang Province, Papua New Guinea
- Coordinates: 05°07′30″S 144°19′23″E

Maps
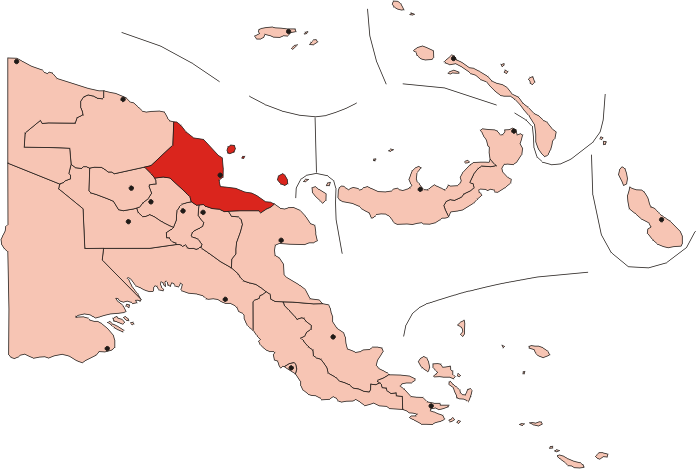
- Madang Province in Papua New Guinea

- Location of the airport in Papua New Guinea
- Source: FlightStats

Sangapi Airport (IATA: SGK, ICAO: AYSK) is an airport serving the village of Sangapi, between Jgapa and Atemble, in the Madang Province of Papua New Guinea.

== Airlines and destinations ==
PNG Air connects Sangapi Airport to Baimuru Airport, Kikori Airport, and Port Moresby International Airport.
