= OBX =

OBX may refer to:

- OBX Index, the benchmark index of the Oslo Stock Exchange
- Outer Banks, a stretch of North Carolina coastline
- Outer Banks (TV series), an action-adventure TV series set on the North Carolina coast
- Oberheim OB-X, a polyphonic analog synthesizer
- OBX, IATA airport code of Obo Airport (Papua New Guinea)
