= VMU (disambiguation) =

VMU may refer to:

- VMU, the memory card for the Dreamcast
- V_{MU}, the minimum unstick speed
- vmu, the ISO 639 code for Muluridyi, a variant of Guugu Yalandji language
- Vytautas Magnus University, a public university in Kaunas, Lithuania
- Vietnam Maritime University, a university in Haiphong, Vietnam
- Baimuru Airport, the IATA code VMU
