= IHU =

IHU may refer to:

== Universities ==
- İbn Haldun Üniversitesi, Istanbul, Turkey
- Imam Hossein University, Tehran, Iran
- Institut hospitalo-universitaire, a research university in Marseille, France
- International Hellenic University, Thessaloniki, Greece; an English-language university

== Other ==
- Ihu Airport (IATA airport code: IHU) in Papua New Guinea
- Ihu Rural LLG, Papua New Guinea, a local government
- Indian Humanist Union, in India
- Irish Hockey Union, now part of the Irish Hockey Association, Ireland
- Irish Homing Union, Ireland; a pigeon society
- SARS-CoV-2 lineage B.1.640.2, the "IHU variant" of the virus that causes COVID-19

== See also ==
- lHU (disambiguation)
