= January 1980 =

Month of 1980

<<	January 1980					>>
Su	Mo	Tu	We	Th	Fr	Sa
		1	2	3	4	5
6	7	8	9	10	11	12
13	14	15	16	17	18	19
20	21	22	23	24	25	26
27	28	29	30	31

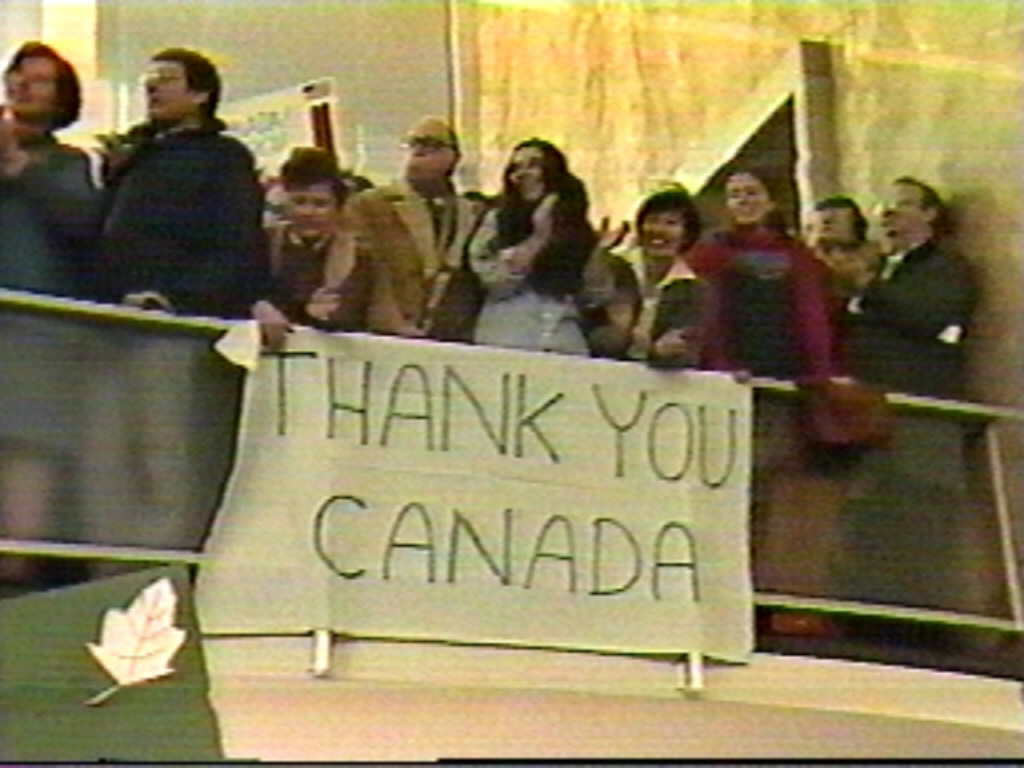
January 27, 1980: Canadian Embassy sneaks six U.S. diplomats out of Iran

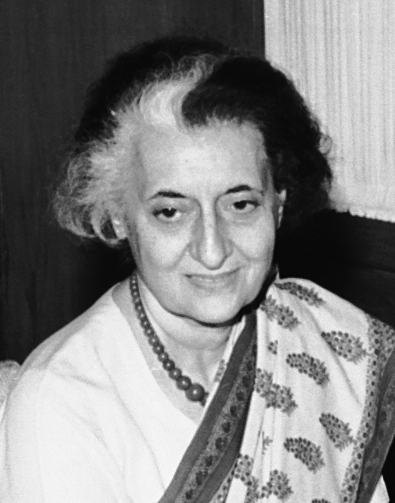
January 6, 1980: Indira Gandhi returned to power in India

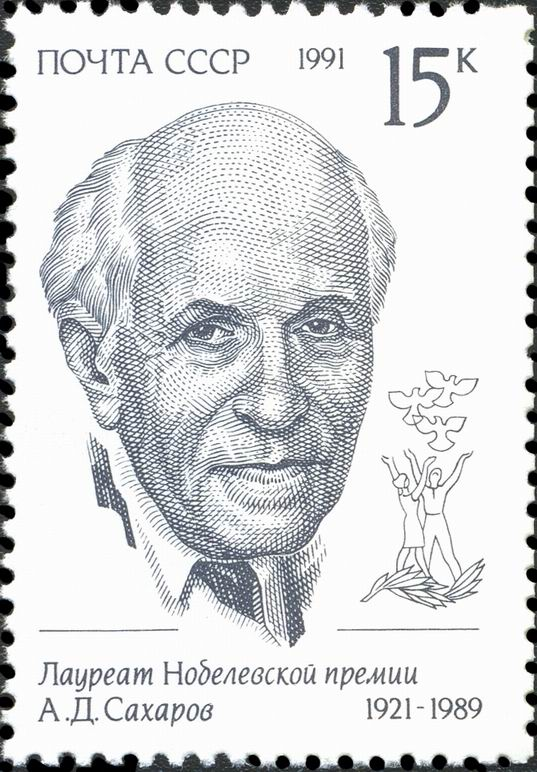
January 22, 1980: Soviet H-bomb inventor Andrei Sakharov arrested and moved to closed city

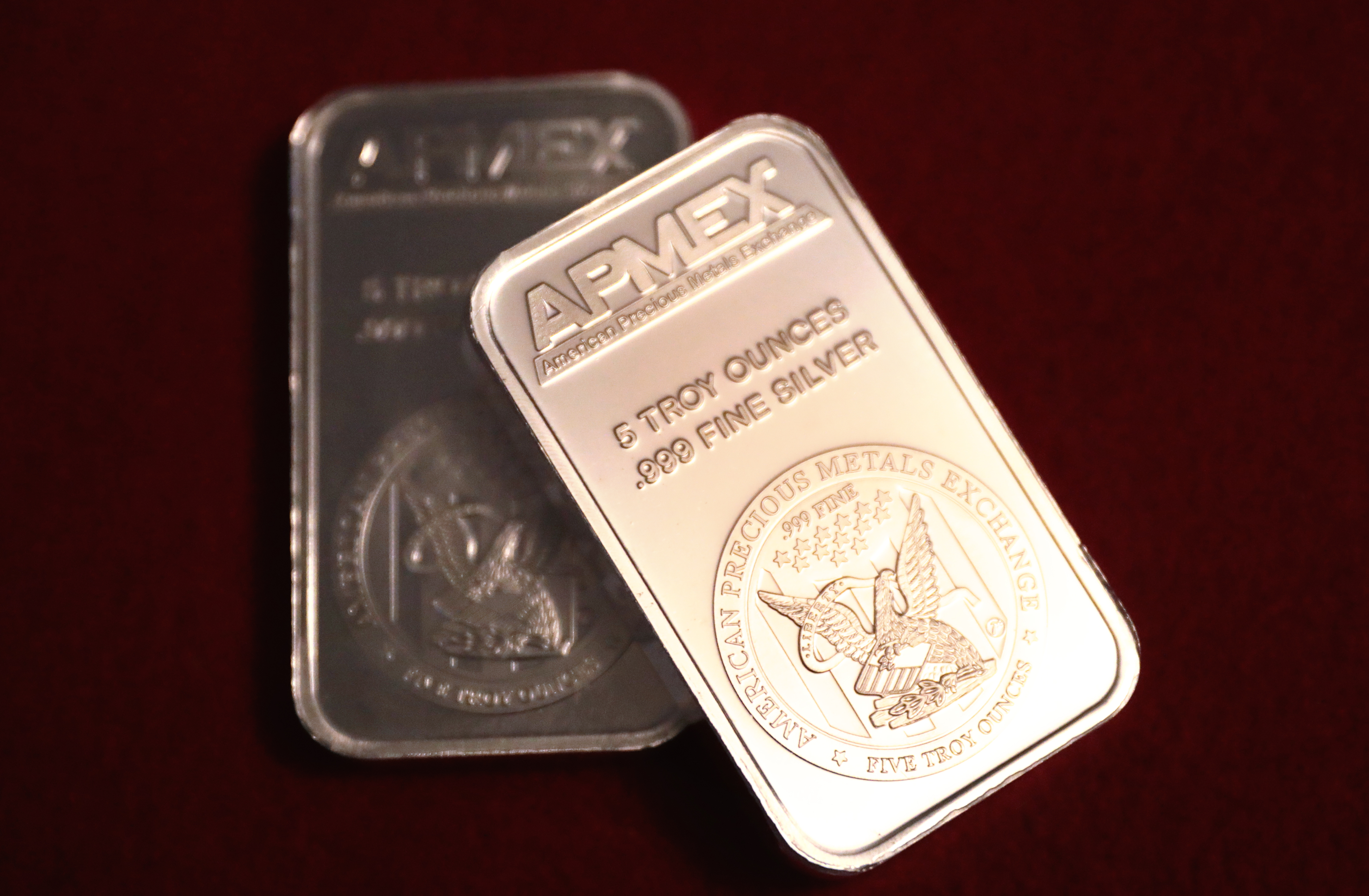
January 18, 1980: Price of silver hits record high of $52.80 per ounce

The following events happened in January 1980:

== January 1, 1980 (Tuesday) ==
- A 6.9 magnitude earthquake struck the Azores at 3:42 in the afternoon local time on the first day of the new decade (1642 UTC), and killed 61 people. Hardest hit by the quake was Terceira Island and its provincial capital, Angra do Heroísmo.
- Forty-eight people at a New Year's party in Canada were killed, and 50 others injured, in the Opémiska Community Hall fire in Chapais, Quebec. At 1:15 in the morning, one of the party goers set fire to a decorative arch, made from dried pine tree branches over the doorway, igniting a blaze that spread to Christmas trees that had been used to decorate the community hall ballroom.
- At 12:01 a.m., Massachusetts became the last of the 50 states of the U.S. to permit drivers to turn right at a red light. Massachusetts changed its law under pressure from the United States Department of Energy, which had threatened to withhold one million dollars in special funds if the state failed to amend its rules to prevent drivers from wasting fuel while idling at a light. The Massachusetts law still allowed municipalities to install a "No Turn on Red" sign at designated intersections, and the Boston Globe noted that the state paid for $100,000 worth of new signs "plus unknown installation costs"; within a week, the Department of Public Works estimated that only one-third of intersections in the state allowed a right turn.

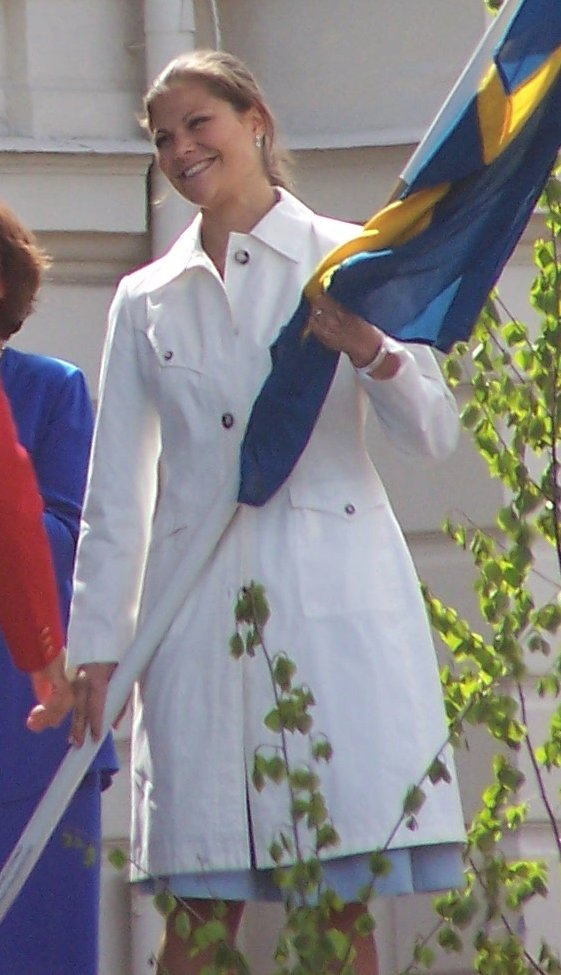
Heiress presumptive Victoria

- Changes to the Swedish Act of Succession placed Princess Victoria of Sweden first in line to the throne ("heir apparent") and therefore Crown Princess, ahead of her younger brother under the new law of absolute primogeniture. Victoria's daughter, Princess Estelle, is next in line for the throne.
- The Sino-American Mutual Defense Treaty, a mutual defense pact between the Republic of China (on the island of Taiwan) and the United States, came to an end a little less than 25 years after it had been signed on March 3, 1955, after the U.S. exercised its option for either party to terminate the treaty upon one year's notice. U.S. President Jimmy Carter had given notice on January 1, 1979, upon establishing full diplomatic relations between the U.S. and the People's Republic of China. The Supreme Court of the United States had declined to review a challenge by U.S. Senator Barry Goldwater, arguing that the treaty could not be terminated by a president without congressional approval.
- Five islands that were part of the New Hebrides protectorate attempted to secede to create the Tafea Nation (named for the first initials of the five islands (Tanna, Aniwa, Futuna, Erromango and Aneityum). The United Kingdom would intervene on May 26, 1980, and the New Hebrides would become independent as Vanuatu in July.
- The #1-ranked Ohio State Buckeyes lost to the #3-ranked USC Trojans, 17 to 16, in the Rose Bowl. In the evening, the #2 ranked Alabama Crimson Tide defeated the #6 ranked Arkansas Razorbacks, 24 to 9, in the Sugar Bowl to set up the question of whether the wire service polls would vote the mythical national college football championship to unbeaten Alabama (12–0–0) or to unbeaten but once-tied USC (11–0–1). The vote came the next day in Alabama's favor.
- Richard Petty who won his 7th NASCAR Drivers' Championship was named the 1979 Driver of the Year by the editors of Auto Racing Digest Magazine.
- The 2nd running of Dakar Rally started in Paris, with 216 vehicles and a truck class (Group T4) running as a separate category for the first time.
- The 26th Airborne Regiment of the Afghan Commando Forces rebelled against the Soviet Army in Bala Hissar, with 700 Afghan paratroopers either being killed or captured.
- Born:
  - Richie Faulkner, English heavy metal guitarist for the band Judas Priest since 2011 (replacing K. K. Downing, who had founded the band in 1969); in London
  - Mark Nichols, Canadian curler and gold medalist for the 2006 Olympic team; in Labrador City, Newfoundland
- Died:
  - Adolph Deutsch, 82, British-born American film score composer and conductor, and winner of three Academy Awards
  - Pietro Nenni, 89, Italian leftist Senator who twice served as Italy's Foreign Minister, and as the nation's Deputy Prime Minister from 1963 to 1968
  - Frank Wykoff, 70, American relay racer and member of the U.S. team that won gold medals at the 1928, 1932 and 1936 Olympic games

== January 2, 1980 (Wednesday) ==
- Both the Associated Press poll of 67 sportswriters and the United Press International poll of 38 coaches agreed that the University of Alabama Crimson Tide was the number one college football team in the United States after the postseason bowl games, which the NCAA acknowledged in the pre-playoff era as the "unofficial college football national champion". In the AP poll, Alabama received more first place votes than the University of Southern California Trojans, 46 to 21 (and 1,317 points to 1,289) and in the UPI poll, the coaches favored Alabama 28 to 9 (and 559 to 539 points), with one vote for the 11-1-0 University of Oklahoma Sooners.
- Willie Stargell of the famed 1979 MLB World Champions Pittsburgh Pirates was named The Sporting News Man of the Year.
- Bert Parks, known for 25 years as the host of the annual Miss America beauty pageant, was fired by the pageant's organizers. Although Parks, known for closing the pageant every year by singing "There She Is, Miss America", said that he knew "nothing about this at all" until being informed by a reporter, the pageant's CEO said that Parks had been sent a letter two weeks earlier that he would not be rehired for another one-year contract.
- Born:
  - Kemi Badenoch, British Secretary of State for Business and Trade; in Wimbledon, London
  - Mac Danzig, American mixed martial artist and King of the Cage lightweight champion from 2005 to 2007; in Cleveland

== January 3, 1980 (Thursday) ==
- U.S. President Jimmy Carter asked the Senate to delay further consideration of ratification of the SALT II Treaty, the second U.S. and U.S.S.R. agreement from the Strategic Arms Limitation Talks to limit the number of nuclear missiles. The treaty had been signed on June 18, 1979, but would never be ratified. Both sides would voluntarily avoid building more missiles beyond the limitations, but the U.S. would exceed the limits in 1986. On July 31, 1991, the U.S. and the U.S.S.R. would sign a new agreement to reduce their stockpile of missiles, START (the Strategic Arms Reduction Treaty), which would be ratified and later superseded by new agreements.
- The five-member Revolutionary Government Junta (JRG) that had ruled El Salvador since October 15 fell apart as two of the three civilian members resigned, leaving the Central American nation controlled by two Salvadoran colonels and one civilian, who resigned the next day. Earlier in the week, all but one of the cabinet ministers had quit in protest over the military domination of the government that had replaced the president, General Carlos Humberto Romero. All three civilian members of the junta resigned on January 3, 1980, along with 10 of the 11 cabinet ministers. The two military leaders, junta chairman Adolfo Majano and Jaime Abdul Gutiérrez, formed a second junta with three new civilians, José Morales, Héctor Dada, and José Ávalos replacing Guillermo Ungo, Mario Andino and Román Mayorga.
- Francisco de Sá Carneiro took office as Prime Minister of Portugal after his Social Democratic Party captured 128 of the 250 seats in Parliament in the December 2 election for the Assembleia da República, succeeding Maria de Lourdes Pintasilgo. Sá Carneiro would be killed in a plane crash before the end of the year, on December 4, 1980.
- Ottis Anderson, the St. Louis Cardinals running back who shattered the NFL's rookie rushing record, became the first player in NFC history to earn both the UPI Player and Rookie of the year Awards when he was a runaway choice as the conference's top first-year player.
- The first production model of the VAZ-2105 automobile, also known as Lada Riva, has been produced in Tolyatti, USSR. It represents an improved and "freshened" version of VAZ-2101, which itself was based on Fiat 124. It would go on to become the world's third best selling, single generation automobile platform, and one of the longest production run platforms, seizing production in 2015.
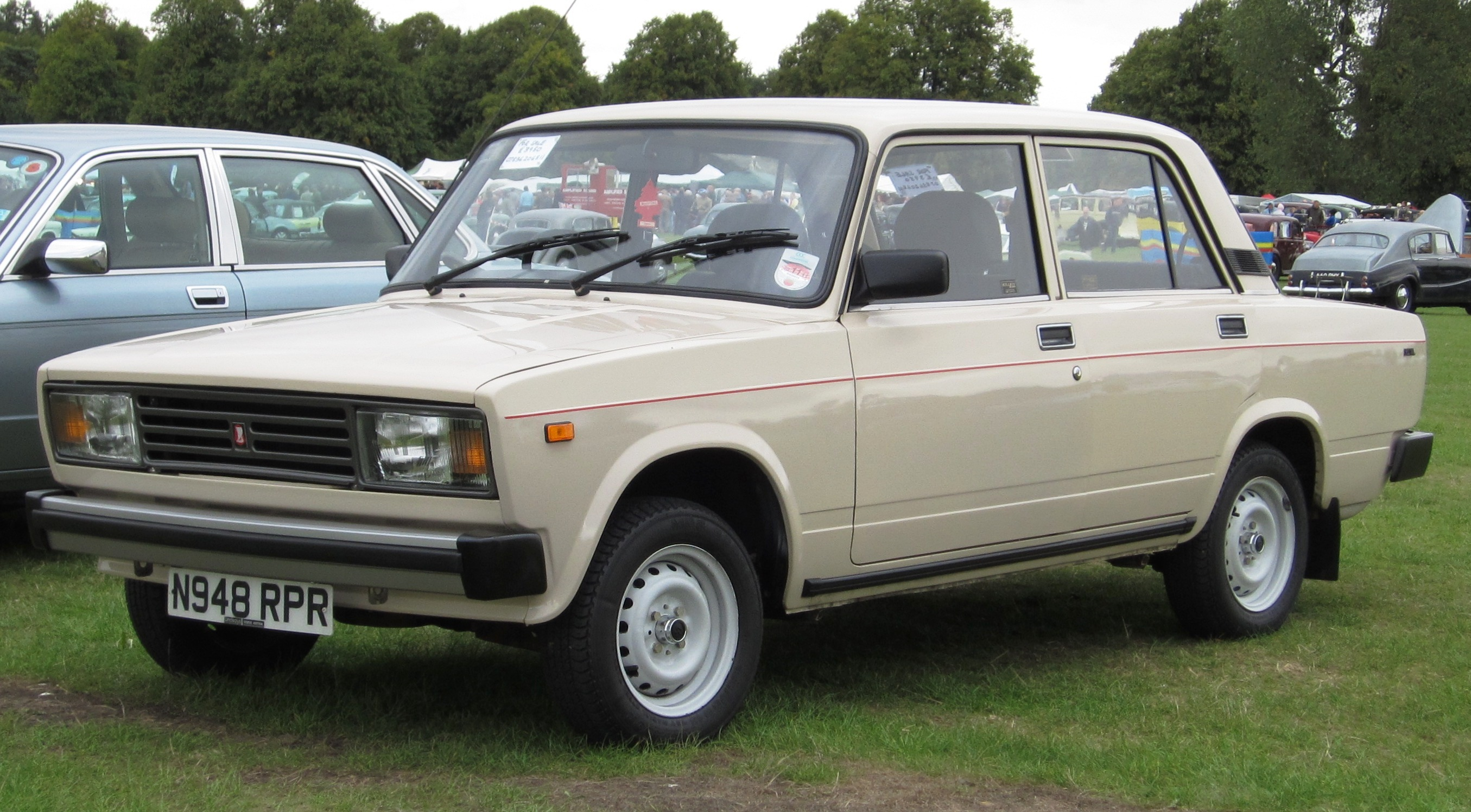
  Lada Riva
- Died: Joy Adamson (born Friederike Gessner), 69, Austro-Hungarian naturalist and author of the bestselling book Born Free, was murdered by a former employee. The media initially reported that Adamson, famous for raising Elsa the lioness from a cub to maturity, had been killed by a lion. On February 8, the employee, Paul Ekai, was charged with Adamson's murder and convicted on August 28, 1981.

== January 4, 1980 (Friday) ==
- U.S. President Carter proclaimed a grain embargo against the USSR with the support of the European Commission. The embargo, which was ineffective against the USSR (which began buying grain from other nations) bypassed by the Soviets would be lifted by Carter's successor, President Ronald Reagan, on April 24, 1981.
- Prime Minister of Mauritania Mohamed Khouna Ould Haidalla became the new head of state of the African nation, forcing out Mohamed Mahmoud Ould Louly as the Chairman of the Military Committee for National Salvation.
- Born:
  - Happy Salma, Indonesian film actress; in Sukabumi, West Java
  - D'Arcy Carden (stage name for Darcy Erokan), American TV actress and comedian, co-star of The Good Place; in Danville, California

== January 5, 1980 (Saturday) ==
- At least 29 Iranian civilians were killed in rioting against the Ayatollah Khomeini's efforts to suppress all opposition to his government rule, mostly in fighting between Sunni Muslims and the ruling Shi'ite Muslim faction in the cities of Bandar Lengeh, Tabriz and Qom.

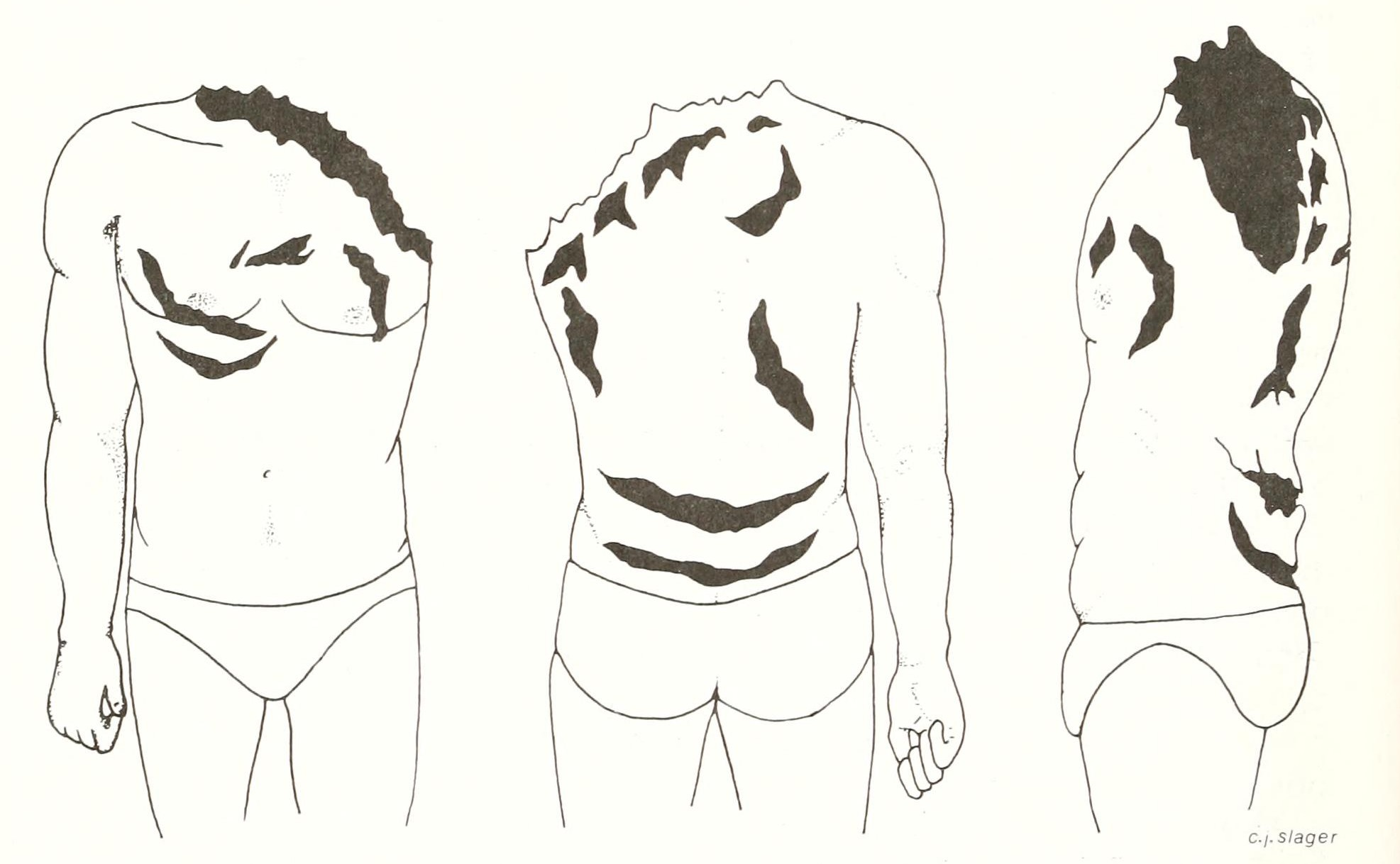
Post-mortem illustration of José Larenas Miranda's injuries.

- While hookah diving for Chilean abalones, José Larenas Miranda's injuries. was attacked and killed by an extremely large shark (probably a great white shark) at Punta Negra, near Pichidangui, Chile. The diver tried to fend the shark off, but was decapitated.
- In bowling, Mark Roth became the first person to succeed on national television on the sport's most difficult play, knocking down both pins in a 7–10 split (achieved only by using the ball to cause one pin to knock down the other). The shot came during the opening event of the 1980 PBA National Tour, the ARC Alameda Open in Alameda, California. Roth finished in fourth place.
- Start of epoch time of the Global Positioning System at 23:59:42 UTC.
- Born: Garette Ratliff Henson, American child actor known for The Mighty Ducks series of films from 1992 to 1996; in Burbank, California

== January 6, 1980 (Sunday) ==
- The regional president of Sicily, Piersanti Mattarella, was killed by the Sicilian Mafia.
- Elections were held in India for the 542 seats in the Lok Sabha returning to power Indira Gandhi's Indian National Congress, the Party won 374 of the 541 seats in the Lok Sabha, the lower house of India's Parliament, while the Janata Party of Prime Minister Charan Singh lost all but 72 of the 305 seats it had held since the 1977 election. Mrs. Gandhi returned to power as Prime Minister of India on January 14 and would remain in power until her assassination on October 31, 1984.

== January 7, 1980 (Monday) ==
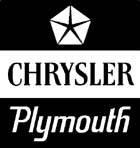

- U.S. President Carter signed the Chrysler Corporation Loan Guarantee Act of 1979 into law, providing a guaranteed federal government loan of $1.5 billion to bail out the financially ailing Chrysler Corporation. "This legislation does not violate the principle of letting free enterprise function on its own," President Carter said, "because Chrysler is unique in its present circumstance." The ten-year loan came with conditions that Chrysler would turn over $162,500,000 of its stock to its employees, in return for hourly workers to forgo $462,500,000 of bargained for wage increases, and white-collar employees yielding $125 million of future raises. Chrysler was also required to obtain $500,000,000 in additional private bank loans on top of the federal loan, and to sell $1.43 billion of its own assets to raise money. Within less than four years, Chrysler would pay off the loan, plus interest, to the United States Treasury, presenting a final check for $813,487,500 to the government on August 12, 1983.
- The United Nations Security Council voted, 13 to 2, to approve UNSC Resolution 462 to demand that the Soviet Union withdraw its troops from Afghanistan, which the USSR had invaded on December 22. The Soviets used their veto power, as one of the five permanent members of the council, to negate the resolution. Two days later, the Security Council approved (12 to 2) Resolution 463, a motion (by Mexico and the Philippines) to submit the question to the entire General Assembly for consideration, a procedural move that could not be vetoed.
- Sister Carolyn Farrell became the first nun to govern an American city, after the city council selected her as the new Mayor of Dubuque, Iowa. Sister Carolyn was part of the Sisters of Charity of the Blessed Virgin Mary.
- National Airlines, one of three U.S. carriers that had scheduled passenger flights to Europe prior to the 1978 deregulation of the industry, was purchased by Pan American World Airways for $437,000,000. Pan Am acquired National's fleet of 43 Boeing 727 jets and 16 DC-10 jumbo jets, but also worsened its financial problems and would cease operations on December 4, 1991.
- On the Icelandic coast guard vessel ICGV Týr a third engineer stabbed and killed 2 men aged 18 and 22 and jumped overboard in 1-3 °C (34-37 °F) Degree sea
- Died:
  - Simonne Mathieu, 71, French tennis player who won the women's French Championships singles title in 1938 and 1939, and had 11 doubles titles at the French Open and at Wimbledon
  - Dov Yosef, 80, Canadian-born Israeli politician in nine ministries from 1948 to 1966

== January 8, 1980 (Tuesday) ==
- At its convention in New Orleans, the NCAA voted to sponsoring its own tournaments for Division II and Division III schools for five women's college sports (basketball, tennis, swimming, volleyball and field hockey), a move that would eventually force the AIAW out of the business.
- Born:
  - Adam Goodes, Indigenous Australian rules football star, with 372 games in a 16-season VFL/AFL career, later named the 2014 Australian of the Year; in Wallaroo, South Australia
  - Sam Riley, English film actor, in Menston, West Yorkshire
- Died: John W. Mauchly, 72, American physicist and computer engineer who designed the first general purpose digital computers, including ENIAC and the first UNIVAC. He and his business partner, J. Presper Eckert, began the first computer manufacturing company, the Eckert–Mauchly Computer Corporation.

== January 9, 1980 (Wednesday) ==
- In Saudi Arabia, 63 Islamist insurgents were beheaded in eight different cities for their part in the siege of the Great Mosque in Mecca on November 24. The leader of the siege, Juhayman al-Otaybi, was decapitated in public in Mecca. Other public beheadings took place in the cities of Riyadh, Medina, Buraidah, Dammam, Abha, Ha'il and Tabuk.
- Born: Sergio García, Spanish professional golfer, 2017 Masters Tournament champion; in Borriol

== January 10, 1980 (Thursday) ==
- The first shipment of U.S. weapons under Operation Cyclone — primarily .303 British Enfield rifles intended for the mujahideen of Afghanistan in their fight against the Soviet Army — arrived in neighboring Pakistan two weeks after the invasion.
- The New England Journal of Medicine published the letter "Addiction Rare in Patients Treated with Narcotics", which would later be later misused to downplay the general risk of addiction to opioids.
- Boston Bruins ice hockey goalie Jim Stewart had one of the worst starts for any professional athlete, playing his first, and only, National Hockey League game. In the 20-minute first period, the St. Louis Blues got the puck past Stewart five times, at 1:08, 2:55, 3:46, 15:27 and 16:42, two of them between Stewart's legs and the final one after Stewart had fallen. Stewart said afterward, "I couldn't stop a basketball." Marco Baron came in at the end of Stewart's 20-minute NHL career, and St. Louis went on to win, 7 to 4.
- Died:
  - George Meany, 85, American labor union leader and the first president of the AFL-CIO, from 1955 to 1979, following the merger of his American Federation of Labor with the Congress of Industrial Organizations
  - Robert "Bo" Rein, 34, American college football coach, was killed in a freak airplane accident after being hired to coach LSU for the 1980 season. Rein and pilot Lewis Benscotter had flown from Baton Rouge, Louisiana, to Shreveport for the coach to recruit a high school player and had left at 9:20 that evening to make the 206 mi (332 km) return trip, expected to take an hour. Benscotter climbed in altitude to avoid a severe thunderstorm and he and Rein apparently passed out as they reached an altitude of 28,000 feet (8,500 m), apparently from deoxygenation from a failure in the cabin pressurization. Chased by a U.S. Air Force fighter, the Cessna Conquest then continued on automatic pilot for 1,400 miles (2,300 km) until running out of fuel and crashing into the Atlantic Ocean, 100 miles (160 km) east of Cape Charles, Virginia, more than three hours later.

== January 11, 1980 (Friday) ==
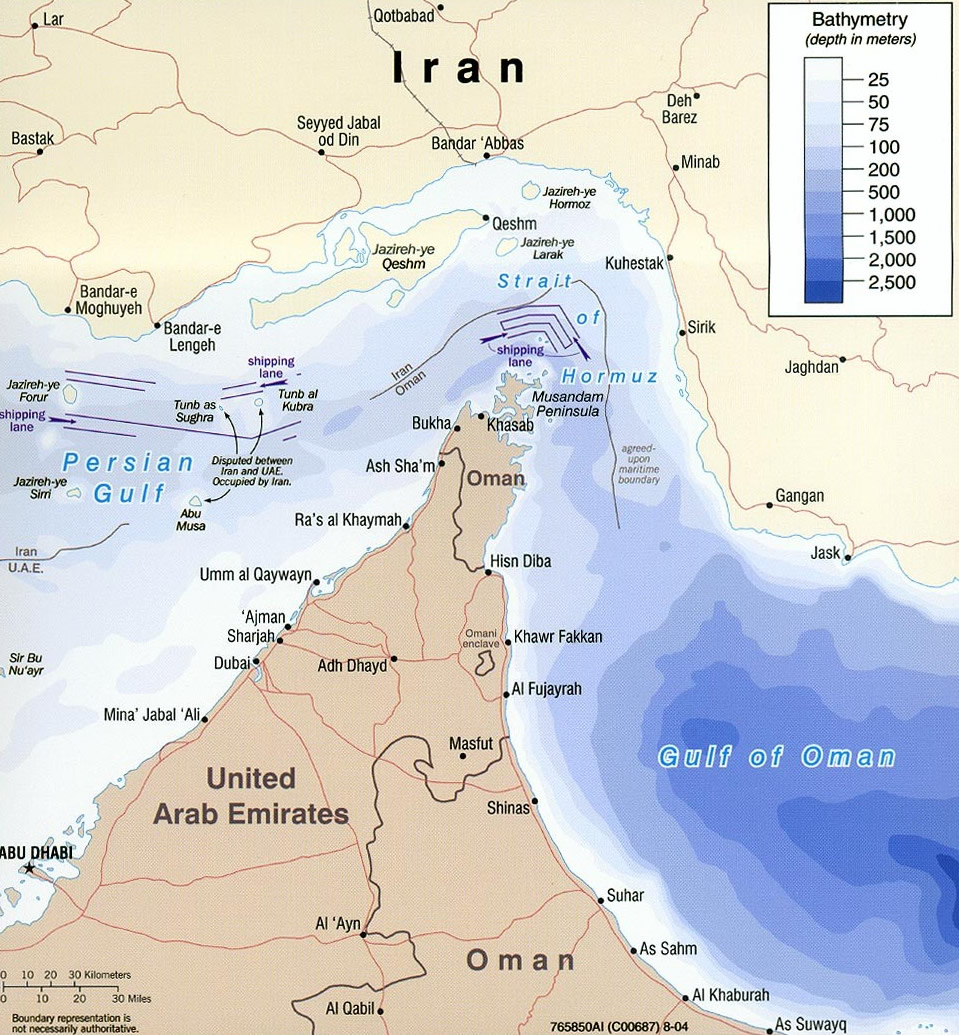
The Strait of Hormuz

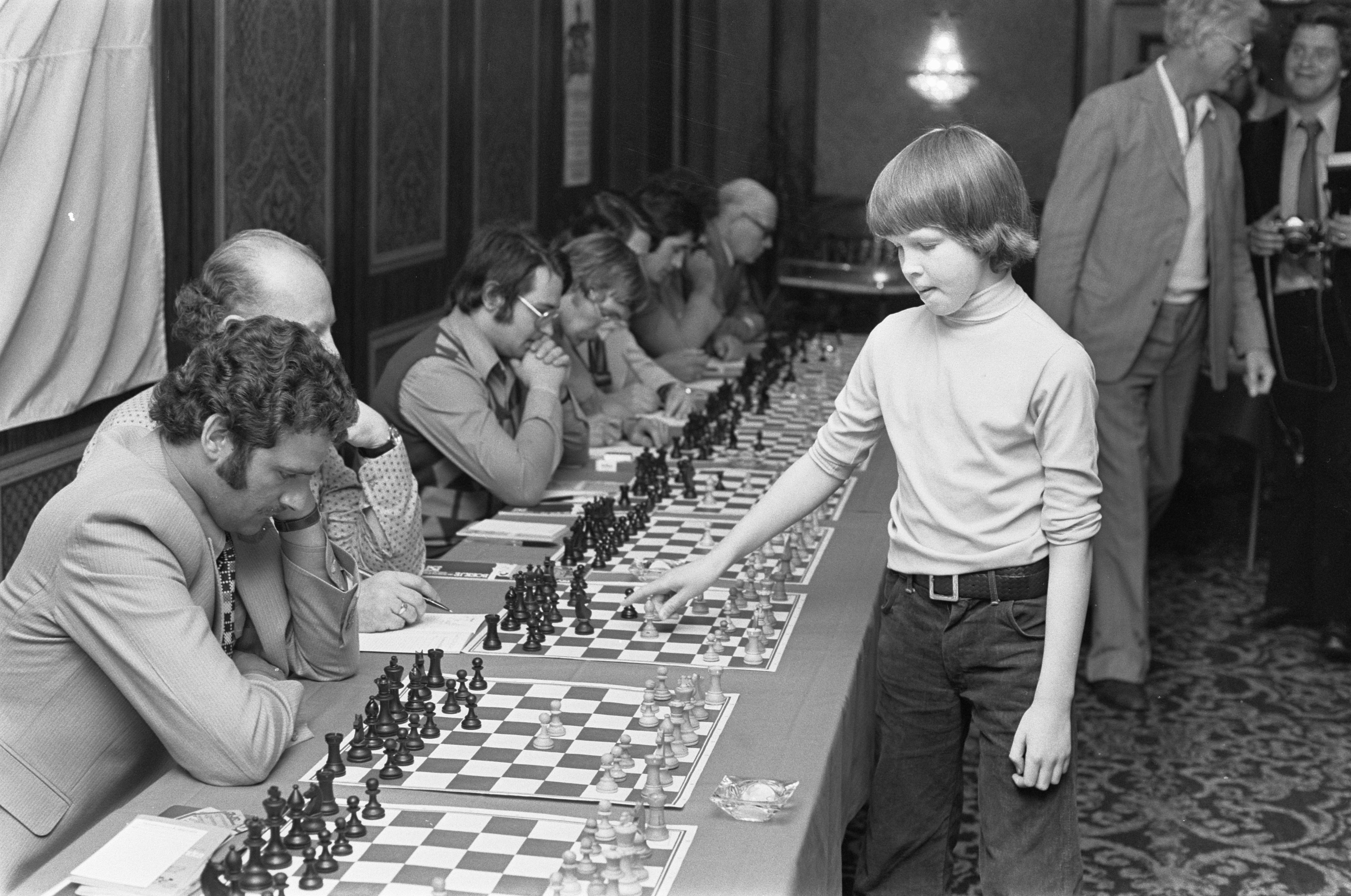
Nigel Short at 11

- Iran's Commerce Minister, Reza Sadr, issued a blunt warning to the United States against any attempt at a blockade of the Strait of Hormuz to enforce an economic embargo. "If the American fleet blocks the mouth of the Persian Gulf," Sadr said, "that will result in war".
- The France–Tonga Maritime Delimitation Convention to set a maritime border marking the offshore territory between the Kingdom of Tonga and the French territory of Wallis and Futuna.
- Nigel Short, 14, became the youngest chess player to be awarded the degree of International Master. Short, a student in Leigh, Lancashire, England, had won the annual Hastings Premier tournament after top seeded player Ulf Andersson of Sweden conceded defeat in the final. Short would be declared a Grandmaster in 1984.
- Born:
  - Lovieanne Jung, American softball player, 2004 Olympic gold medalist and 2002 and 2006 World Championship medalist; in Honolulu
  - The Giannini sextuplets, Italian siblings who were the second set of sextuplets to survive infancy (after the Rosenkowitz sextuplets born on January 11, 1974, in South Africa (Letizia, Linda, Fabrizio, Francesco, Giorgio and Roberto), in Florence
- Died:
  - Barbara Pym, 66, English novelist
  - Celia Sánchez, 49, Cuban revolutionary activist

== January 12, 1980 (Saturday) ==
- West Germany's new Green Party (Die Grünen) held its founding Congress at Karlsruhe as an activist for environmentalism and for the peace movement. A London correspondent noted that "West Germany has a new political force, the likes of which this country has not seen since the war." The delegates voted to approve the Four Pillars (Vier Grundwerten) of the Green Party (Social justice, Ecological wisdom, Grassroots democracy and Nonviolence), and elected Petra Kelly as their first leader. From 1998 to 2005, it would be part of the ruling coalition of Germany with the Social Democratic party.
- Born: Amerie (stage name for Amerie Marie Rogers), American R & B singer and actress; in Fitchburg, Massachusetts
- Died: Finn Ronne, 80, Norwegian polar explorer

== January 13, 1980 (Sunday) ==
- For the second time in a week, the Soviet Union used its United Nations Security Council veto power. A resolution, sponsored by the United States, calling for economic sanctions against Iran until the release of hostages from Tehran's U.S. Embassy, was approved 10 to 2 (with two abstentions) but the Soviets then cast a veto, killing the measure.
- Joshua Nkomo, leader of the Zimbabwe African People's Union, returned to Zimbabwe Rhodesia after his exile in neighboring Zambia, and prepared to compete in the pre-independence parliamentary elections.
- The U.S. offered $400,000,000 of military and economic aid to Pakistan to protect the Islamic nation from the Soviet Union, which had invaded neighboring Afghanistan three weeks earlier.
- Three people— an American and two French tourists— were injured by a terrorist bomb at the New York City office of Aeroflot, the Soviet Union's national airline. At 6:07 in the evening, a man in a ski mask threw a package into the airline's office at 545 Fifth Avenue. Callers claiming to be from the Jewish Defense League and from the anti-Castro Omega 7 group took credit.
- Died: Andre Kostelanetz, 78, Russian-born American orchestra conductor

== January 14, 1980 (Monday) ==
- Indira Gandhi returned to office as Prime Minister of India, taking an oath of office and an oath of secrecy administered by President Neelam Sanjiva Reddy at Ashoka Hall within the Rashtrapati Bhavan presidential palace in New Delhi. With her Congress Party in control of 351 of 525 seats in the Lok Sabha, her return for the first time since 1977 allowed her to rule "from a position of strength unequaled by any government in India's history."
- The United Nations General Assembly voted, 104 to 18, in favor of the measure contained in the vetoed United Nations Security Council Resolution 462. The resolution did not mention the Soviet Union directly, but "strongly deplored" the invasion of Afghanistan and called for "the immediate, unconditional and total withdrawal of the foreign troops in Afghanistan". Eighteen nations abstained, and 12 were absent from the vote.
- Born:
  - Carlos Alvarado Quesada, President of Costa Rica 2018 to 2022; in San José
  - Hiroshi Tamaki, Japanese film and TV actor; in Nagoya
  - Cory Gibbs, American soccer football defender, U.S. national team player; in Fort Lauderdale, Florida
- Died:
  - Rachel Fuller Brown, 81, American chemist who developed (along with Elizabeth Lee Hazen) nystatin, the first useful antifungal antibiotic.
  - Robert Ardrey, 71, American author known for his 1961 paleoanthropology book African Genesis and the 1966 followup, The Territorial Imperative

== January 15, 1980 (Tuesday) ==
- The Islamic Republic of Iran ordered all foreign television journalists to leave the country by midnight on Friday.
- Brandon Tartikoff, who would turn around the fortunes of the third-place NBC television network during the 1980s, became chief of programming for the network at the age of 31, when he was named as the new President of NBC Entertainment.
- In an unusual show of vigilante justice, a mob of about 300 people in the town of Belford Roxo in Rio de Janeiro state beat two robbers to death. The two thieves had boarded a bus, forced passengers in the impoverished town to give up money at gunpoint, and then were chased by an outraged mob. One thief was shot four times by a victim. The two men had taken less than ten dollars.

== January 16, 1980 (Wednesday) ==
- As the Iran Hostage Crisis continued, Walter Cronkite closed his CBS Evening News broadcast with the words "And that's the way it is, Wednesday, January 16th, 1980, the 74th day of captivity for 50 Americans in Iran. This is Walter Cronkite, CBS News. Good night." For the rest of the crisis, Cronkite would continue the tally at the end of each broadcast, until January 20, 1981, "the 444th day of captivity for 50 Americans in Iran".
- Farragut, Tennessee, was incorporated as a municipality by residents of the East Tennessee community who wished to avoid annexation by adjacent Knoxville. The town has a population of about 23,000 in 2020.
- Born:
  - Lin-Manuel Miranda, American Broadway musical producer and actor, multiple Tony Award, Grammy Award and Emmy Award winner as well as the Pulitzer Prize; known for writing the music and lyrics for, and starring in the title role, in Hamilton; in New York City
  - Albert Pujols, Dominican-born Major League Baseball first baseman, three time National League MVP; as José Alberto Pujols Alcántara in Santo Domingo

== January 17, 1980 (Thursday) ==
- The oil tanker Salem was scuttled by its own crew and sank in the ocean, after violating an embargo against delivering oil to South Africa and unloading 192,000 tons of oil at Durban. After the delivery of oil, the Salem was allegedly filled with seawater. The owners later tried to make an insurance claim against Lloyd's of London for $56,300,000.
- Born:
  - Zooey Deschanel, American film and TV actress; in Los Angeles
  - Maksim Chmerkovskiy, Ukrainian-born American professional dancer; in Odessa

== January 18, 1980 (Friday) ==
- The price of silver hit its peak ($52.80 per troy ounce on the Chicago Board of Trade (CBOT)) during trading as brothers Nelson Bunker Hunt, William Herbert Hunt and Lamar Hunt attempted to corner the market by buying one-third of the world's silver in what economists would later describe as "one of the most serious manipulations of an American futures market to occur in this century." At the start of 1979, the price had been $6.08 per troy ounce. After January 18, the price steadily declined, with a massive selloff on March 27, 1980, now referred to as Silver Thursday.
- The Almö Bridge, connecting the Swedish city of Tjörn to the mainland, collapsed after the Norwegian freighter MS Star Clipper struck the bridge arch at 1:27 in the morning and took out its main span. Eight motorists were killed when, driving through a fog and unaware that the bridge was out, plunged to their deaths 41 metres (135 ft) below into the waters of the Hake Fjord. Police on the mainland sealed off their side of the bridge within 14 minutes. According to a report of the Associated Press, "A policeman on Tjorn Island was telephoned at home some 10 minutes after the accident, but it took him 50 minutes to get dressed and drive to the site to block the other end, police said."
- Born:
  - Julius Peppers, American football defensive end and NFL star; in Wilson, North Carolina
  - Estelle (stage name for Estelle Fanta Swaray), British singer and songwriter; in London
  - Jason Segel, American TV comedian and actor known for How I Met Your Mother; in Los Angeles
- Died:
  - Cecil Beaton, 76, English costume designer for stage and film, winner for four Tony Awards and three Academy Awards
  - Barbara Britton, 59, American film, radio and television actress best known as one of the title characters in the Mr. and Mrs. North broadcast series; from pancreatic cancer

== January 19, 1980 (Saturday) ==
- The remains of King Alfonso XIII of Spain, who reigned for almost 45 years before being dethroned and forced to leave the country in 1931, were buried in his native land almost 40 years after his death. The former king had been buried in Italy after his death on February 28, 1941. On orders of his grandson, King Juan Carlos I, Alfonso's casket was brought to the Mediterranean port of Cartagena on the Spanish Navy frigate Asturias and then flown to the burial site at El Escorial.
- Wilt Chamberlain's record, for 122 National Basketball Association games with 50 or more points scored by a player, was broken by the rest of the NBA players in history. Freeman Williams of the San Diego Clippers scored 51 points in a 137 to 123 loss to the Phoenix Suns, marking "only the 123rd time that a player other than Wilt has reached the 50 mark. In other words, it has taken all other NBA players 31 years... to 'break' Wilt's record."
- The Pro Football Hall of Fame welcomes 4 new inductees: Herb Adderley of the famed Green Bay Packers, Deacon Jones who coined the word sack, Bob Lilly of the Dallas Cowboys and Jim Otto one of the Oakland Raiders originals.
- Born: Jenson Button, British race car driver and winner of the 2009 Formula One World Championship; in Frome, Somerset
- Died:
  - William O. Douglas, 81, U.S. Supreme Court Justice from 1939 to 1975
  - Dana X. Bible, 88, American college football coach

== January 20, 1980 (Sunday) ==
- The Pittsburgh Steelers pro football team defeated the Los Angeles Rams, 31 to 19, to win Super Bowl XIV and their fourth NFL title in six seasons. Played in Pasadena, California, at the Rose Bowl Stadium, the game was watched by 103,985 spectators, a record that still stands, as well as an estimated 76,200,000 viewers on television. The Rams led the game at the end of each of the first three quarters (7–3, 13–10 and 19–17), but Pittsburgh scored two touchdowns in the fourth quarter, putting the game out of reach with a less than two minutes to play.
- The collapse of wooden bleachers during a bullfight in the Colombian town of Sincelejo, and the subsequent stampede of panicked survivors who trampled those people who were on the ground, killed 222 spectators. An estimated 40,000 fans were at the bullring, the largest in the South American nation, and about 3,000 had been standing on the section that fell. Investigators concluded that the ground beneath the supporting beams had been softened by recent heavy rains.
- U.S. President Carter informed the United States Olympic Committee that he wanted the USOC not to participate in the Summer Olympic Games, scheduled to open in Moscow on July 19, as a response to the Soviet Union's invasion of Afghanistan. "The course I am urging is necessary to help secure the peace of the world at this critical time," he wrote in a letter to USOC President Robert Kane, adding "If our response to aggression is to continue with international sports as usual in the capital of the aggressor, our other steps to deter aggression are undermined." Within one week, the U.S. Congress passed a non-binding resolution of support for a deadline giving the Soviet Union until February 20 to withdraw invading troops from Afghanistan, with 386-12 approval in the House and 88-4 approval in the Senate.
- In Ljubljana, as Yugoslavian head of state Josip Broz Tito became worse in his illness, his left leg was amputated.
- Born:
  - Philippe Gagnon, Canadian Paralympic gold medalist and swimmer; in Saguenay, Quebec
  - Philippe Cousteau Jr., U.S. environmentalist, journalist and TV personality; in Santa Monica, California

== January 21, 1980 (Monday) ==
- The price of gold reached a record high of $887.50 per troy ounce shortly after the opening of the Commodity Exchange (COMEX) in New York City (equivalent to $2,943 in 2020), before dropping during the day to close at $851.00. The price on the London Bullion Market Association trading floor closed at a record of $843.00 per troy ounce ($2,249.50 when adjusted for inflation). In 2019, the price would close at $1,523 per tr.oz.
- All 128 people on board Iran Air Flight 291 were killed when the Boeing 727 jet crashed on its approach to Tehran after a 90-minute flight from Mashhad, Iran's second largest city. At 7:11 in the evening, the jet went down in the Elburz Mountains about 18 miles (29 km) from the Tehran-Mehrabad Airport.

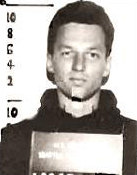
Boyce

- American spy Christopher John Boyce, convicted in 1977 of selling classified documents to the Soviet Union, escaped from the federal prison in Lompoc, California, where he was serving a 40-year sentence. Boyce eluded capture for almost two years, committing 17 bank robberies in an attempt to finance an escape to the U.S.S.R., before being arrested by U.S. Marshals on August 21, 1981. Boyce, nicknamed "the Falcon" and the subject of a book and the 1985 film The Falcon and the Snowman, would be released in 2002 to a halfway house in San Francisco, then paroled on March 14, 2003, after having served 25 years of an 89-year prison sentence.
- The song I Got You by Split Enz, which would go on to become the best-selling single in Australian history up to that time, was released.
- Born:
  - Nana Mizuki, Japanese pop singer and voice singer; in Niihama, Ehime
  - Kevin McKenna, Canadian soccer football centre back and Canadian national team player; in Calgary
- Died: Georges Painvin, 93, French cryptanalyst who broke the German ADFGVX cipher during World War One

== January 22, 1980 (Tuesday) ==
- Andrei Sakharov, Soviet nuclear physicist and human rights activist, was arrested in Moscow and then deported to the city of Gorky, off limits at the time to foreigners. Sakharov, who had publicly criticized the Soviet invasion of Afghanistan, was leaving his apartment to attend a meeting when police stopped his car and drove him to the office of prosecutor general Aleksandr Rekunkov, who informed him of his relocation to Gorky. Yelena Bonner, Sakharov's wife, was allowed to go with him and the two were then taken to Domodedovo Airport and then flown to the exile city. Sakharov, the chief designer of the Soviet Union's first hydrogen bomb, would live in exile in Gorky until December 19, 1986, and would live for almost three more years in Moscow until his death on December 14, 1989.
- The Guardia Nacional of El Salvador fired into a crowd of anti-government protesters in San Salvador, killing at least 22 people and possibly as many as 50, while wounding hundreds of others.
- Born: Christopher Masterson, American TV actor known for Malcolm in the Middle; in Hempstead, New York

== January 23, 1980 (Wednesday) ==
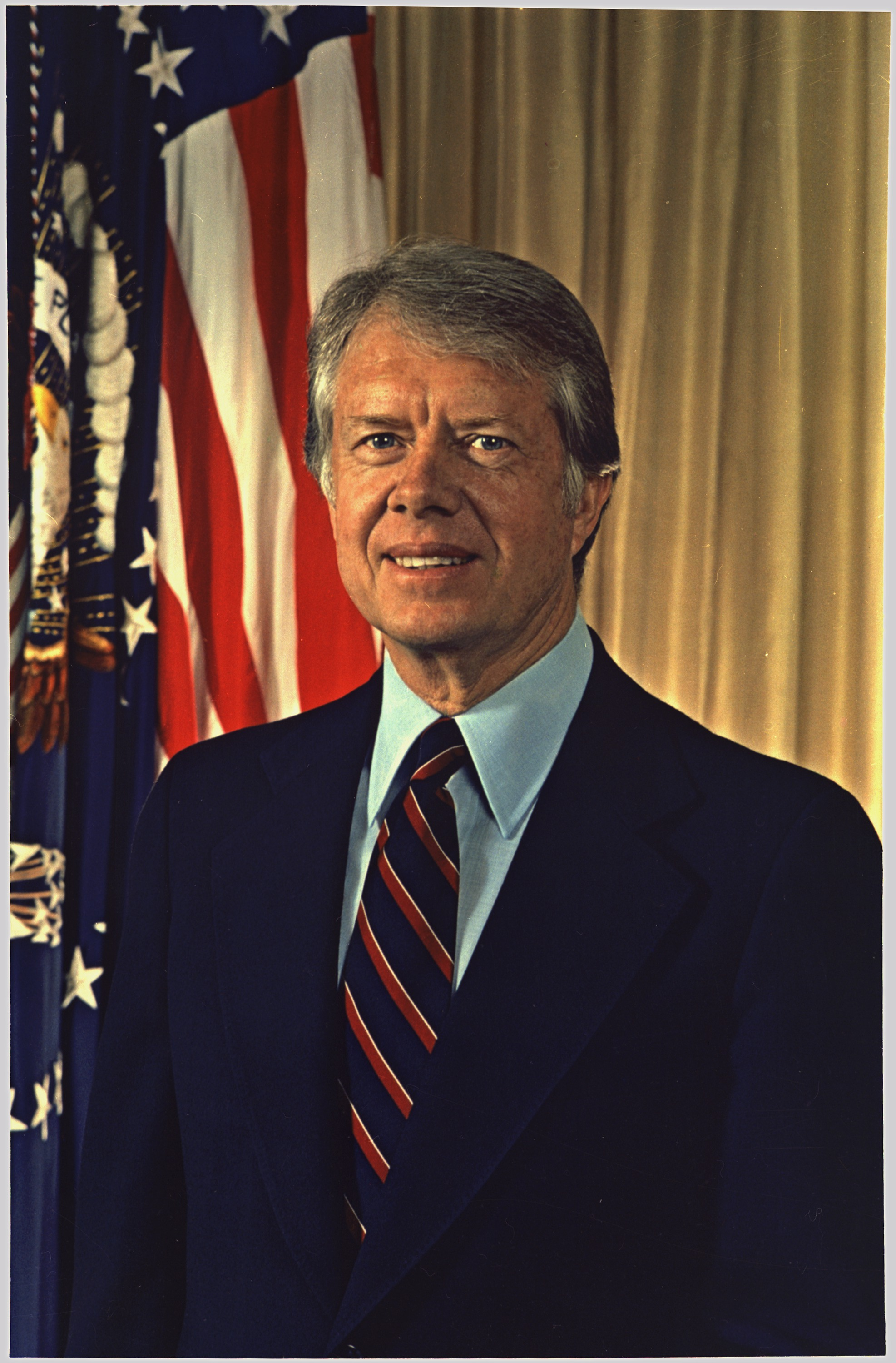
U.S. President Carter

- At his annual State of the Union Address to Congress, U.S. President Carter announced a change in American foreign policy, defining what the press referred to as "The Carter Doctrine", which was summed up in a single sentence: "An attempt by any outside force to gain control of the Persian Gulf region will be regarded as an assault on the vital interests of the United States of America, and such an assault will be repelled by any means necessary, including military force."
- Freddy Kottulinsky on Volkswagen Iltis and Cyril Neveu on Yamaha XT 500 finished first in their classes on 1980 Paris–Dakar Rally.
- Died: Lil Dagover (stage name for Martha Seubert), 92, popular German film actress

== January 24, 1980 (Thursday) ==
- The United States announced that it would begin the sale of military equipment (but not weapons) to the People's Republic of China.
- Only one of the 44 people aboard a Burmese Air Force airplane survived after the Fairchild FH-227B crashed shortly after takeoff. One of the turboprop's two engines failed as the plane departed from Mandalay on a flight to Rangoon (now Yangon) and the aircraft struck the roof of a factory.

== January 25, 1980 (Friday) ==
- Voters in Iran participated in that nation's first presidential election and overwhelmingly favored Foreign Minister Abolhassan Banisadr, the candidate endorsed by Iran's spiritual leader, the Ayatollah Khomeini. Banisadr received more than 75 percent of the votes in a field of eight candidates. The second-place finisher, Ahmad Madani received less than 16 percent. Banisadr was inaugurated as the Islamic Republic's first President on February 5, but would serve only 16 months before being removed from office by the Majlis. After a month in hiding, Banisadr was able to fly out of Iran and would eventually live in exile in France.
- At 11:00 in the evening Eastern Time, Black Entertainment Television (BET) began telecasting as the first cable channel aimed at African American audiences. Robert L. Johnson, President of BET, said in a press release "The creation of a black television network means that, for the first time in this nation's history, black Americans will have access to a network that programs specifically to their entertainment and informational interests." The initial offering, available to 350 cable systems and 4,500,000 households, was the 1974 film Visit to a Chief's Son. BET originally operated only two hours per week, on Friday nights, offering unedited films, along with commercials. The next two programs were 1977's Which Way Is Up? on February 1 and Scott Joplin on February 8.
- Born:
  - Christian Olsson, Swedish Olympic gold medalist (in 2004) and professional track and field athlete; in Gothenburg
  - Xavi (Xavier Hernández Creus), Spanish soccer football midfielder with 133 appearances for the Spanish national team; in Terrassa, Barcelona province
  - Michelle McCool, American professional wrestler and WWE Women's Champion; in Palatka, Florida

== January 26, 1980 (Saturday) ==
- Israel and Egypt established diplomatic relations, and exchanged ambassadors one month later on February 26. Egypt opened its ports and airports to Israeli planes and ships. In return, Israel completed its withdrawal of troops from two-thirds of the Sinai peninsula that it had been occupying since 1967, redeploying them to an area east of a line running from El Arish to Ras Muhammad National Park.
- American singer Frank Sinatra performed in Brazil at Maracanã Stadium in Rio de Janeiro before his largest audience ever, a crowd of 140,000 people, with an 18-song set.
- At a track meet in New Zealand at Auckland, U.S. athlete Mary Decker broke the record for the fastest one mile run by a woman, covering the distance in 4 minutes and 21.7 seconds, three-tenths of a second faster than the 1979 record set by Natalia Mărășescu of Romania.
- Born: Danny Dietz, U.S. Navy SEAL and Navy Cross awardee, in Aurora, Colorado (killed in action, 2005)
- Died: Justas Paleckis, 81, Lithuanian Communist who formally surrendered the Republic of Lithuania to annexation by the Soviet Union in 1940, after being installed by Soviet occupiers as the nation's last president. He then became the first Chairman of the Presidium of the Lithuanian SSR until retiring in 1967.

== January 27, 1980 (Sunday) ==
- Disguised as a Canadian film crew, four United States diplomats and their spouses — Joseph and Kathleen Stafford, Mark and Cora Lijek, Bob Anders and Lee Schatz — used fake Canadian passports to escape from Tehran, Iran, as they boarded Swissair Flight 363 at 5:30 in the morning and flew to Zürich. On November 4, five members of the group had escaped from the back of the U.S. Embassy compound during a rainstorm, even as it was being taken over by student demonstrators, and were joined by a sixth who had been working in a nearby office. For almost three months, they were protected by Kenneth D. Taylor, Canada's Ambassador to Iran and in the home of Canada's chief immigration officer, John Sheardown. The New York Times was aware of the six Americans, but the editors agreed with the U.S. Department of State not to reveal the story. Antonio J. Mendez of the U.S. Central Intelligence Agency's Office of Technical Service provided the fake passports, along with disguise materials and clothing "to match what might be expected of a film crew", and then escorted the six Americans to the Mehrabad Airport. The event would be dramatized in the 2012 film Argo.
- The border between Egypt and Israel was opened for the first time since the founding of Israel in 1948. A woman named Geula Gilboa was the first Israeli citizen to cross into Israel by land, traveling across the border at El Arish, where she was welcomed by Egyptian officials. Egypt's President Anwar Sadat and Israel's Prime Minister Menahem Begin announced the agreement on November 21, 1977.
- A group of 300 Tunisian rebels crossed from Libya into Tunisia and attacked Gafsa, killing 20 people.
- Robert Mugabe, leader of the Zimbabwe African National Union, returned to Rhodesia after more than four years in exile to run in the upcoming national elections, and was greeted in Salisbury by a crowd of 200,000 people, noted as a larger crowd than that which had greeted his rival, Joshua Nkomo. ZANU won the control in parliamentary elections and Mugabe became the first Prime Minister of the Republic of Zimbabwe on April 18.
- David Sutton, a coin shop owner in Everett, Washington, became the first victim of Charles T. Sinclair, the "Coin Shop Killer".
- Born: Marat Safin, Russian-born professional tennis player, winner of the 2000 U.S. Open and the 2005 Australian Open, and the ATP #1 ranked player for nine weeks in 2000; in Moscow
- Died:
  - Giuseppe "Peppino" De Filippo, 76, Italian comedian and film actor
  - Sir Eric Wyndham White, 67, British economist and the first executive secretary of GATT (General Agreement on Tariffs and Trade)

== January 28, 1980 (Monday) ==
- Twenty-three of the 50 crew died when the U.S. Coast Guard cutter USCGC Blackthorn collided with the oil tanker SS Capricorn in Tampa Bay and then capsized. At 8:21 in the evening, the cutter and the much larger tanker impacted. The anchor of Capricorn tore into the hull of Blackthorn, then separated, pulling the cutter downward and leaving a large hole that filled with water. Within three minutes, by 8:24, the Coast Guard cutter sank along with the crew who had not been able to evacuate. A shrimp boat, The Bayou rescued 22 of the 27 survivors from chilly waters.

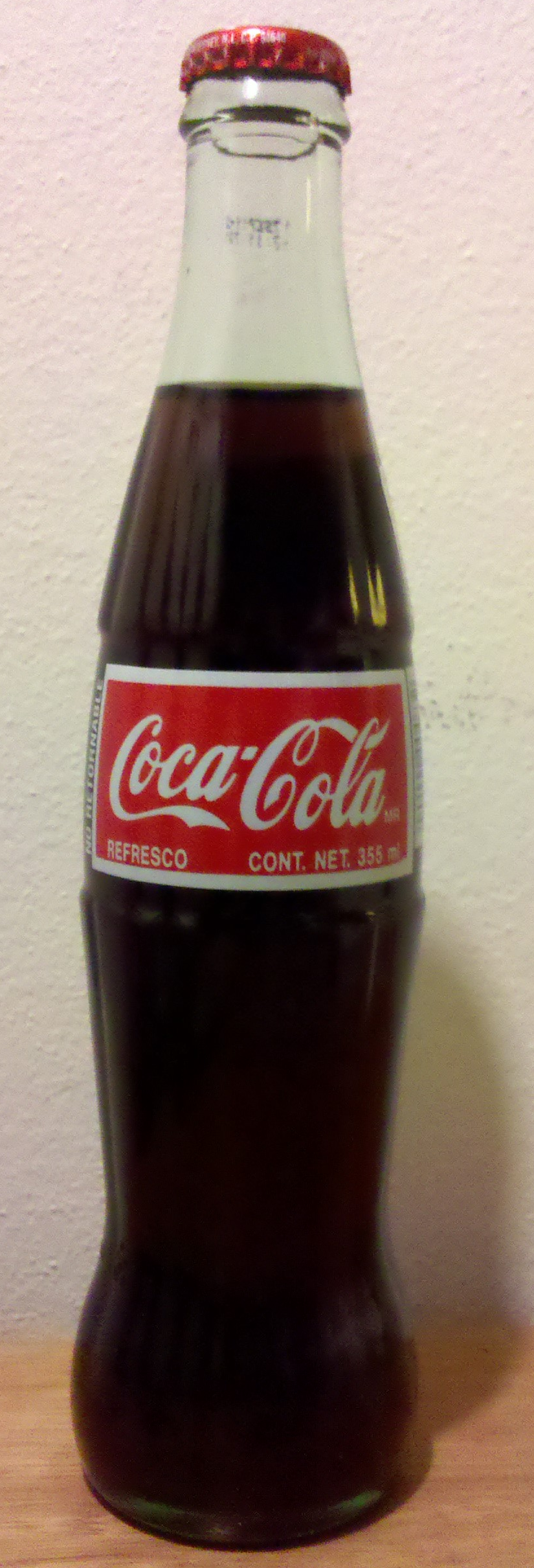
A Coca-Cola with sucrose

- The Coca-Cola Company announced that it would cease sweetening its beverages with sucrose from cane sugar, and began substituting high-fructose corn syrup, which caused a slight, but noticeable, change in the flavor. A spokesman said, "The sugar from corn is just an alternative sweetener as was the case years ago when beet sugar became an alternate sugar to sugar cane. It is an alternative sweetener and in most cases is expected to result in a less expensive sweetener system which may help offset other increased costs."
- Born:
  - Nick Carter, American pop musician and founding member of the Backstreet Boys; in Jamestown, New York
  - Yasuhito Endō, Japanese soccer football midfielder with the most appearances (152) for the national team; in Kagoshima
- Died:
  - Franco Evangelisti (composer), 54, Italian electronic music composer
  - James J. Saxon, 65, U.S. Comptroller of the Currency from 1961 to 1967

== January 29, 1980 (Tuesday) ==
Rubik's Cube

- The Rubik's Cube made its international debut at The British Toy and Hobby Fair, Earl's Court, London.
- The song Call Me by Blondie, which would become the best-selling single of the U.S. in the Billboard Hot 100, was released.
- Born: Jason James Richter, American child actor known for the Free Willy series of films; in Medford, Oregon
- Died:
  - Jimmy Durante, 86, American film, radio and television comedian
  - Kroger Babb, 73, American exploitation film promoter

== January 30, 1980 (Wednesday) ==
- South Africa removed the last of its troops from Zimbabwe. The South African Army declined to disclose how many soldiers it had at Beitbridge on the north side of the railroad bridge of the same name over the Limpopo River, a strategic spot that controlled the main artery of commerce into Zimbabwe.
- The Belgrano III Base was inaugurated by the Argentine Army in Antarctica on Berkner Island, a section of ice on top of an underwater island as part of the Filchner–Ronne Ice Shelf. The base was shut down on January 15, 1984, because the ice it was on was becoming more unstable.
- Born:
  - Wilmer Valderrama, American-Venezuelan TV actor known for NCIS and That '70s Show; in Miami
  - Lee Zeldin, American attorney and congressman, in East Meadow, New York
- Died:
  - Professor Longhair (stage name for Henry Roeland Byrd), 61, African-American jazz pianist; from a heart attack
  - Warren Smith, 47, American rockabilly music and country music singer; from a heart attack
  - Maria Bolognesi, 56, Italian Roman Catholic evangelist known for her visions of Jesus Christ; beatified in 2012, from a heart attack

== January 31, 1980 (Thursday) ==
- Spain's Embassy in Guatemala was invaded and set on fire during an attempt by Guatemalan commandos to free 10 people taken hostage by the Committee for Peasant Unity. Eight of the hostages and 28 of the occupiers were burned to death after a fire swept through the second floor. Spain severed all diplomatic relations with Guatemala after the incident.
- Kang Shi'en, a Vice Premier of the People's Republic of China and chief of the nation's Economic Commission, made the first statement from the Chinese government that the nation's population had reached one billion people. Kang's remarks came in an address to a group of delegates from Norway's shipping industry, when he said "Even if we succeed in restricting the population, we will have 1 billion, 200 million people by the year 2000. We already have 1 billion." Western analysts noted that Kang's estimate "presumably includes the 17 million people on Taiwan, which the Peking government considers a part of China." The official number as of the Census of July 1, 1982 was that the mainland population was 1,008,180,738 people, a figure announced in the newspaper People's Daily on October 27, 1982.

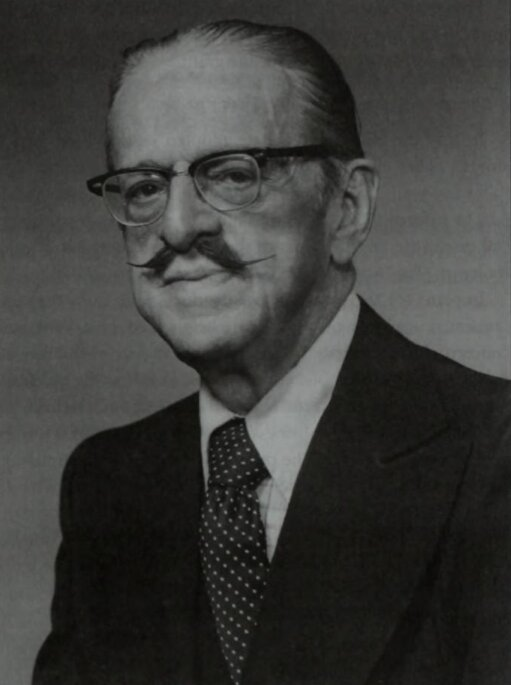
Flood

- U.S. Representative Daniel J. Flood of Pennsylvania resigned from Congress after being censured for his conviction for bribery.
- Queen Queen Juliana of the Netherlands announced that she would abdicate the throne on April 30, her 71st birthday, in favor of her eldest daughter, Crown Princess Beatrix. Juliana, who had ascended the throne on September 4, 1948, upon the abdication of her mother, Queen Wilhelmina, timed the nationally televised announcement for Beatrix's 42nd birthday.
