= Kamusi Airport =

Airport in Kamusi, Western, Papua New Guinea

- IATA: KUY; ICAO: AYKS

Summary
- Location: Kamusi, Papua New Guinea
- Coordinates: 7°25′10.56″S 143°7′19.92″E
- Interactive map of Kamusi Airport

Kamusi Airport is an airport in Kamusi, Papua New Guinea. Located in the Western Province, in the central part of the country, Kamusi Airport is situated 500 km northwest of the nation's capital, Port Moresby. It is positioned at an elevation of 27 meters above sea level.

The area surrounding Kamusi Airport is flat. There are fewer than 2 people per square kilometer in the vicinity of Kamusi Airport. The surrounding area is mostly covered by forest.

== Airlines and destinations ==
PNG Air connects Kamusi Airport to Awaba Airport and Kikori Airport.
