= LHU =

LHU may refer to:

- Lạc Hồng University, Dong Nai, Vietnam
- Langer Heinrich Uranium Mine, Namibia; see Mining in Namibia
- Liverpool Hope University, Liverpool, England, UK
- Lock Haven University of Pennsylvania, Lock Haven, Pennsylvania, USA
- Lunghwa University of Science and Technology, a university in Taiwan
- Lahu language (ISO 639 code lhu)
- Loharu Junction railway station (station code: LHU), Loharu, India
- lhu, Load Half (U), an RISC-V instruction

== See also ==
- IHU (disambiguation)
