= Woitape Airport =

- IATA: WTP; ICAO: AYWT

Summary
- Location: Woitape, Papua New Guinea
- Coordinates: 8°33′45″S 147°15′09″E

Map
- Location of airport in Papua New Guinea

Woitape Airport is an airfield serving Woitape, in the Central Province of Papua New Guinea.

== Airlines and destinations ==
PNG Air connects Woitape Airport to Tapini Airport and Port Moresby International Airport.
