= Tapini Airport =

Airport in Tapini, Central, Papua New Guinea

- IATA: TPI; ICAO: AYTI

Summary
- Location: Tapini, Papua New Guinea
- Coordinates: 8°21′24″S 146°59′21″E

Map
- Location of airport in Papua New Guinea

Tapini Airport is an airfield serving Tapini, in the Central Province of Papua New Guinea.

== Airlines and destinations ==
PNG Air connects Tapini Airport to Woitape Airport and Port Moresby International Airport.
