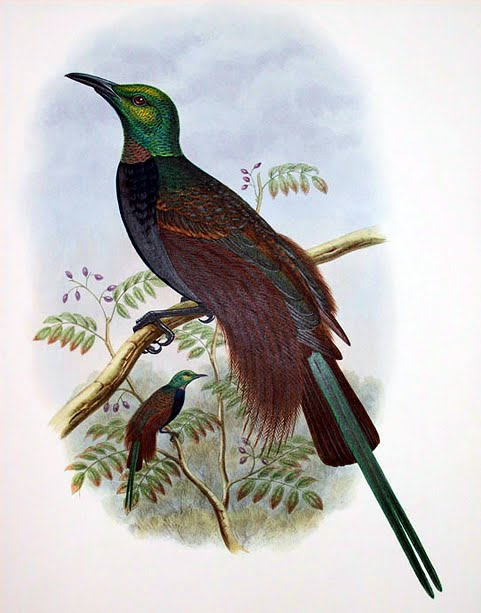

Scientific classification
- Domain: Eukaryota
- Kingdom: Animalia
- Phylum: Chordata
- Class: Aves
- Order: Passeriformes
- Superfamily: Corvoidea
- Family: Paradisaeidae
- Hybrid: Ptiloris magnificus × Paradisaea minor

Synonyms
- Janthothorax bensbachi Büttikofer, 1894

= Bensbach's bird-of-paradise =

Hybrid bird

Bensbach's bird-of-paradise, also known as Bensbach's riflebird, is a bird in the family Paradisaeidae that is often now considered an intergeneric hybrid between a magnificent riflebird and lesser bird-of-paradise. However, some authors, such as Errol Fuller, believe that it was a distinct and possibly extinct species.

== History ==
Only one adult male specimen is known of this bird, held in the Netherlands Natural History Museum and coming from the Arfak Mountains of north-western New Guinea. It is named after Jacob Bensbach, Dutch Resident at Ternate, who presented the specimen to the museum.
