= Suki Airport =

Airport in Western Province, Papua New Guinea

- IATA: SKC; ICAO: AYSU

Summary
- Location: Suki, Papua New Guinea
- Coordinates: 08°02′47.5″S 141°43′19.7″E

Map
- Location of airport in Papua New Guinea

Suki Airport (IATA: SKC, ICAO: AYSU) is an airport in Suki, in the Western Province of Papua New Guinea.

== Airlines and destinations ==
PNG Air connects Suki Airport to Daru Airport and Obo Airport.
