= Kikori Airport =

Airport in Kikori, Gulf, Papua New Guinea

- IATA: KRI; ICAO: AYKK

Summary
- Location: Kikori, Papua New Guinea
- Elevation AMSL: 40 ft (12 m)
- Coordinates: 07°25′29″S 144°14′59″E
- Interactive map of Kikori Airport

Runways
| Direction | Length | | Surface |
| Direction | ft | m | Surface |
|---|---|---|---|
| 12/30 | 2,297 | 700 |

Kikori Airport is an airport in Kikori, Papua New Guinea (IATA: KRI, ICAO: AYKK). Believed to be originally built during the Second World War, it fell into disuse. In about 1965 work began to upgrade it due to the closure of the Catalina flying-boat service. The airstrip, tar sealed, was opened about 1967. By 1999, the bitumen had been largely eroded (probably due to the high rainfall) and had been covered with Marsden Matting. It was still in service as late as 2002.

== Airlines and destinations ==
PNG Air connects Kikori Airport to Baimuru Airport, Balimo Airport, Kamusi Airport, Kerema Airport, and Mount Hagen Airport.
