= List of the busiest airports in Oceania =

This is a list of the busiest airports in Oceania, ranked and broken down by its total passengers per year, which includes arrival, departure and transit passengers.

== Statistics ==
Airports Council International's full-year figures are as follows. Note that all the statistics are taken from the year 2017, unless stated otherwise in the notes section.

Rank	Airport	City	Country	Code (IATA/ICAO)	Total passengers	Notes
1	(Australia) Sydney Airport	Sydney	Australia	SYD/YSSY	41,870,000	
2	(Australia) Melbourne Airport	Melbourne	Australia	MEL/YMML	36,706,000	Data taken in early 2016
3	(Australia) Brisbane Airport	Brisbane	Australia	BNE/YBBN	23,205,702	
4	(New Zealand) Auckland Airport	Auckland	New Zealand	AKL/NZAA	20,025,922	Data taken from April 2018
5	(United States) Daniel K. Inouye International Airport	Honolulu	United States	HNL/PHNL	19,950,707	Data taken from 2016
6	(Australia) Perth Airport	Perth	Australia	PER/YPPH	13,690,610	
7	(Australia) Adelaide Airport	Adelaide	Australia	ADL/YPAD	8,090,000	
8	(New Zealand) Christchurch Airport	Christchurch	New Zealand	CHC/NZCH	6,566,598	
9	(Australia) Gold Coast Airport	Gold Coast	Australia	OOL/YBCG	6,457,086	
10	(United States) Kahului Airport	Kahului	United States	OGG/PHOG	6,444,000	
11	(New Zealand) Wellington Airport	Wellington	New Zealand	WLG/NZWN	6,049,194	
12	(Australia) Cairns Airport	Cairns	Australia	CNS/YBCS	4,898,189	
13	(Guam) Antonio B. Won Pat International Airport	Hagåtña	Guam	GUM/PGUM	3,800,000	Data taken from 2018
14	(United States) Kona International Airport	Kona	United States	KOA/PHKO	3,283,000	
15	(Australia) Canberra Airport	Canberra	Australia	CBR/YSCB	2,995,470	
16	(United States) Lihue Airport	Lihue	United States	LIH/PHLI	2,899,000	
17	(Australia) Hobart Airport	Hobart	Australia	HBA/YMHB	2,440,792	
18	(Fiji) Nadi International Airport	Nadi	Fiji	NAN/NFFN	2,291,635	Data taken from 2017
19	(New Zealand) Queenstown Airport	Queenstown	New Zealand	ZQN/NZQN	2,140,669	Data taken from June 2018
20	(Australia) Darwin Airport	Darwin	Australia	DRW/YPDN	2,057,307	Data taken from 2015
21	(Australia) Townsville Airport	Townsville	Australia	TSV/YBTL	1,497,946	Data taken from 2015
22	(Papua New Guinea) Jacksons International Airport	Port Moresby	Papua New Guinea	POM/AYPY	1,400,000	Data taken from 2015
23	(United States) Hilo International Airport	Hilo	United States	ITO/PHTO	1,306,000	
24	(Australia) Launceston Airport	Launceston	Australia	LST/YMLT	1,272,198	Data taken from 2015
25	(Australia) Newcastle Airport	Newcastle	Australia	NTL/YWLM	1,257,210	
26	(France) (French Polynesia) Faa'a International Airport	Papeete	French Polynesia	PPT/NTAA	1,195,105	Data taken from 2015
27	(New Zealand) Nelson Airport	Nelson	New Zealand	NSN/NZNS	1,000,373	
28	(New Caledonia) La Tontouta International Airport	Nouméa	New Calédonia	NOU/NWWW	538,791	
29	(New Caledonia) Nouméa Magenta Airport	Nouméa	New Calédonia	GEA/NWWM	454,540	

== See also ==
- World's busiest airports by passenger traffic
- World's busiest airports by traffic movements
- World's busiest airports by cargo traffic
- World's busiest airports by international passenger traffic
- World's busiest city airport systems by passenger traffic
