= Balimo Urban LLG =

Local-level government in Papua New Guinea

- District map of Western Province
- Country: Papua New Guinea
- Province: Western Province
- Time zone: UTC+10 (AEST)

Balimo Urban LLG is a local-level government (LLG) of Western Province, Papua New Guinea. It is served by Balimo Airport.

== Wards ==
- 80. Balimo Urban
