= Sasereme Airport =

Airport in Western Province, Papua New Guinea

- IATA: TDS; ICAO: AYSS

Summary
- Airport type: Public
- Location: Sasereme, Papua New Guinea
- Time zone: Pacific/Port_Moresby (GMT +10:00) ({{{utc}}})
- Elevation AMSL: 37.00 m (121.39 ft)
- Coordinates: 07°37′22″S 142°52′8″E

Map
- Location of airport in Papua New Guinea
- Source: IATA https://www.world-airport-codes.com/papua-new-guinea/sasereme-82011.html

Sasereme Airport (IATA: TDS, ICAO: AYSS) is an airport in Sasereme, in the Western Province of Papua New Guinea.

== Airlines and destinations ==
PNG Air connects Sasereme Airport to Awaba Airport, Balimo Airport, and Kerema Airport.
