= Advanced Brake Warning =

Advanced Brake Warning Systems are a technology developed in Israel in 1989 which display additional signalling information, such as by actuating the brake lights when a driver suddenly and abruptly releases the accelerator pedal in preparation for a panic stop.

Other proposed systems advocate a different signal (brake lights brighter or blinking) during a hard panic stop or when a vehicle is no longer moving at all.

While these concepts were advocated to various regulatory bodies in the U.S. and Europe during the 1990s, the idea has met with limited enthusiasm and much opposition. Many of the objections assert that drivers do not have time to assimilate extra information sent by non-standard signalling apparatus and that even the advanced warning of a brake light being actuated by the driver's foot suddenly leaving the accelerator could generate enough false alerts to render the impact of such a system meaningless.

The systems are therefore not approved even as aftermarket devices in many western markets and there is little prospect of them being required to be installed on new cars by automobile manufacturers anytime in the near future.
