= Ihu Airport =

Airport in Gulf, Papua New Guinea

- IATA: IHU; ICAO: AYIH

Summary
- Serves: Ihu, Papua New Guinea
- Elevation AMSL: 12 m / 39 ft
- Coordinates: 07°53′51″S 145°23′46″E

Map
- Airport in Papua New Guinea

Runways
Direction	Length		Surface
Direction	m	ft	Surface
12/30	807	2,648
- Source: PNG Airstrip Guide, GCM, WAD, STV

Ihu Airport (IATA: IHU, ICAO: AYIH) is an airfield serving Ihu, in the Gulf Province of Papua New Guinea.
