= Balimo Airport =

Airport in Western, Papua New Guinea

- IATA: OPU; ICAO: AYBM

Summary
- Airport type: Public
- Location: Balimo, Papua New Guinea
- Elevation AMSL: 100 ft (30 m)
- Coordinates: 08°03.07′S 142°56.42′E

Map
- Location of airport in Papua New Guinea

Runways
Direction	Length		Surface
Direction	m	ft	Surface
10/28	1,390	4,560
- Source: PNG Airstrip Guide

Balimo Airport (IATA: OPU, ICAO: AYBM) is an airfield serving Balimo, in the Western Province of Papua New Guinea.

== Airlines and destinations ==
PNG Air connects Balimo Airport to Daru Airport, Kerema Airport, and Sasereme Airport.
