= Lake Murray Airport =

Airport in Western, Papua New Guinea

Coordinates: 7°0′35.71″S 141°29′38.41″E

- IATA: LMY; ICAO: AYLM

Summary
- Location: Lake Murray, Papua New Guinea
- Interactive map of Lake Murray Airport

Lake Murray Airport (IATA: LMY, ICAO: AYLM) is an airport at Lake Murray, Papua New Guinea.

== Airlines and destinations ==
PNG Air connects Lake Murray Airport to Kiunga Airport and Obo Airport.
