= Samberigi Airport =

Airport in Samberigi, Southern Highlands, Papua New Guinea

- IATA: none; ICAO: AYSM

Summary
- Location: Samberigi, Papua New Guinea
- Elevation AMSL: 3,800 ft / 1,158 m
- Coordinates: 6°43.33′S 143°56.12′E

Map
- Location of airport in Papua New Guinea

Runways
Direction	Length		Surface
Direction	m	ft	Surface
12/30	579	1,900
- Source: PNG Airstrip Guide

Samberigi Airport is an airfield serving Samberigi, in the Southern Highlands Province of Papua New Guinea.

It is a one-way airstrip on the slopes of Mt Murray.
