= Chimbu Airport =

- IATA: CMU; ICAO: AYCH

Summary
- Airport type: Public
- Operator: Government
- Location: Kundiawa, Papua New Guinea
- Elevation AMSL: 4,974 ft (1,516 m)
- Coordinates: 06°01′27″S 144°58′13″E

Map
- Location of airport in Papua New Guinea

Runways
Direction	Length		Surface
Direction	ft	m	Surface
03/21	3,330	1,015	Asphalt
- Source: DAFIF

Chimbu Airport (IATA: CMU, ICAO: AYCH) is an airport serving Kundiawa, the capital of the Simbu Province in Papua New Guinea.

== Airlines and destinations ==
Air Niugini connects Chimbu Airport to Port Moresby International Airport.
