= Bensbach Airport =

Airport in Western, Papua New Guinea

- IATA: BSP; ICAO: AYBH

Summary
- Location: Bensbach, Papua New Guinea
- Elevation AMSL: 30 ft / 9 m
- Coordinates: 8°51.38′S 141°15.36′E

Map
- Location of airport in Papua New Guinea

Runways
Direction	Length		Surface
Direction	m	ft	Surface
14/32	845	2,772
- Source: PNG Airstrip Guide

Bensbach Airport is an airfield serving Bensbach, in the Western Province of Papua New Guinea. It was built to service the nearby Bensbach Wildlife Lodge and opened in February 1977.
