= Abau Airport =

Airport in Papua New Guinea

- IATA: ABW; ICAO: none

Summary
- Location: Abau, Papua New Guinea
- Elevation AMSL: 10 ft / 3 m
- Coordinates: 10°10′S 148°42′E

Map
- Location of airport in Papua New Guinea

Runways
Direction	Length		Surface
Direction	ft	m	Surface
	2,500	762

Abau Airport (IATA: ABW) is an airport in Abau, Papua New Guinea.
