= Baimuru Airport =

Airport in Gulf, Papua New Guinea

- IATA: VMU; ICAO: AYBA

Summary
- Airport type: Public
- Location: Baimuru, Papua New Guinea
- Elevation AMSL: 10 ft (3.0 m)
- Coordinates: 07°29.69′S 144°49.36′E

Map
- Location of airport in Papua New Guinea

Runways
Direction	Length		Surface
Direction	m	ft	Surface
04/22	900	2,953	Grass
- Source: PNG Airstrip Guide

Baimuru Airport (IATA: VMU, ICAO: AYBA) is an airfield serving Baimuru, in the Gulf Province of Papua New Guinea. It is at an elevation of 10 feet (3 m) above mean sea level and has a 900-metre (2,953 ft) long runway designated 04/22.

== Airlines and destinations ==
PNG Air connects Baimuru Airport to Kerema Airport and Kikori Airport.
