= Awaba Airport =

Airport in Western, Papua New Guinea

- IATA: AWB; ICAO: AYAW

Summary
- Airport type: Public
- Location: Awaba, Papua New Guinea
- Elevation AMSL: 60 ft (18 m)
- Coordinates: 08°00.86′S 142°45.06′E

Map
- Location of airport in Papua New Guinea

Runways
Direction	Length		Surface
Direction	m	ft	Surface
18/36	705	2,313
- Source: PNG Airstrip Guide

Awaba Airport (IATA: AWB, ICAO: AYAW) is an airfield serving Awaba, in the Western Province of Papua New Guinea.

== Airlines and destinations ==
PNG Air connects Awaba Airport to Daru Airport and Sasereme Airport.
