= Obo Airport (Papua New Guinea) =

Airport in Obo, Western, Papua New Guinea

- IATA: OBX; ICAO: AYOB

Summary
- Location: Obo, Papua New Guinea
- Coordinates: 7°35′25.91″S 141°19′27″E

Map
- Location of airport in Papua New Guinea

Obo Airport (IATA: OBX, ICAO: AYOB) is an airport in Obo, Papua New Guinea.

== Airlines and destinations ==
PNG Air connects Obo Airport to Lake Murray Airport and Suki Airport.
