= Kerema Airport =

Airport in Kerema, Gulf, Papua New Guinea

- IATA: KMA; ICAO: AYKM

Summary
- Airport type: Public
- Location: Kerema, Papua New Guinea
- Elevation AMSL: 10 ft (3.0 m)
- Coordinates: 07°57′49″S 145°46′17″E
- Interactive map of Kerema Airport

Runways
Direction	Length		Surface
Direction	ft	m	Surface
14/32	3,044	928	Asphalt
- Source: World Aero Data

Kerema Airport is an airport in Kerema, Papua New Guinea (IATA: KMA, ICAO: AYKM).

== Accidents and incidents ==
On 6 February 2025, a twin-engine aircraft operated by TropicAir veered off the runway during takeoff at the airport due to strong winds. No injuries were reported among its eight passengers and crew.

== Airlines and destinations ==
PNG Air connects Kerema Airport to Balimo Airport, Sasereme Airport, and Port Moresby International Airport.
