= List of airports in Solomon Islands =

This is a list of airports in the nation state of Solomon Islands, sorted by location. Other airports within the Solomon Islands archipelago but outside of Solomon Islands can be found at list of airports in Papua New Guinea

== Airports ==
Airport names shown in bold indicate the airport has scheduled service on commercial airlines.

Location	Province	ICAO	IATA	Airport name
Afutara, Malaita Island	Malaita	AGAF	AFT	Afutara Airport
Anuha Island, Nggela Islands	Central		ANH	Anuha Airport
Arona, Ulawa Island	Makira-Ulawa	AGAR	RNA	**Ulawa Airport** (Arona Airport)
Atoifi, Malaita Island	Malaita	AGAT	ATD	**Uru Harbour Airport** (Atoifi Airport)
Auki, Malaita Island	Malaita	AGGA	AKS	**Auki Gwaunaru'u Airport**
Avu Avu	Guadalcanal	AGGJ	AVU	Avu Avu Airport
Balalae, Shortland Island	Western	AGGE	BAS	**Balalae Airport**
Barora, New Georgia Island	Western		RRI	Barora Airport
Batuna, Vangunu Island	Western	AGBT	BPF	Batuna Airport
Anua, Bellona Island	Rennell and Bellona	AGGB	BNY	**Bellona/Anua Airport**
Choiseul Bay, Taro Island	Choiseul	AGGC	CHY	**Choiseul Bay Airport**
Maringe, Fera Island (near Santa Isabel Island)	Isabel	AGGF	FRE	**Fera Airport** (Fera/Maringe Airport)
Gatokae (Nggatokae Island), New Georgia Islands	Western	AGOK	GTA	Gatokae Aerodrome (Gatokae Airport)
Geva, Vella Lavella Island	Western	AGEV	GEF	Geva Airport
Gizo, Ghizo Island	Western	AGGN	GZO	**Nusatupe Airport** (Gizo Airport)
Honiara, Guadalcanal Island	Guadalcanal	AGGH	HIR	**Honiara International Airport** (formerly Henderson Field)
Kaghau Island	Choiseul	AGKG	KGE	**Kaghau Airport**
Kirakira, Makira Island	Makira-Ulawa	AGGK	IRA	**Kirakira Airport** (Ngorangora Airstrip)
Kukudu (Kukundu), Kolombangara	Western	AGKU	KUE	Kukudu Airport
Kwai Harbour	Malaita		KWR	Kwai Harbour Airport
Marau, Guadalcanal Island	Guadalcanal	AGGU	RUS	Marau Airport
Lomlom, Reef Islands	Temotu	AGLM	LLM	**Lomlom Airport**
Parasi, Marau Sound Island	Guadalcanal	AGGP	PRS	Marau Airport (Parasi Airport)
Mbambanakira, Guadalcanal Island	Guadalcanal	AGGI	MBU	Mbambanakira Airport (Babanakira Airfield)
Mono Island, Treasury Islands	Western	AGGO	MNY	**Mono Airport**
Munda, New Georgia Island	Western	AGGM	MUA	**Munda Airport**
Onepusu	Malaita		ONE	Onepusu Airport
Ontong Java	Malaita	AGGQ		Ontong Java Airport
Ramata Airport (Ramata Island)	Western	AGRM	RBV	**Ramata Airport** (Ramata Island Airstrip)
Tingoa, Rennell Island	Rennell and Bellona	AGGR	RNL	**Rennell/Tingoa Airport**
Ringgi Cove, Kolombangara	Western	AGRC	RIN	Ringgi Cove Airport (Vila Airport)
Santa Ana Island (Owaraha)	Makira-Ulawa	AGGT	NNB	**Santa Ana Airport**
Santa Cruz Islands, Nendo Island	Temotu	AGGL	SCZ	**Luova Airport** (Santa Cruz Airport)
Savo Island	Central		SVY	Savo Airport
Seghe, New Georgia Island	Western	AGGS	EGM	**Seghe Airport**
Suavanao, Santa Isabel Island	Isabel	AGGV	VAO	**Suavanao Airport**
Tarapaina	Malaita		TAA	Tarapaina Airport
Tulagi Island (Tulaghi)	Central		TLG	Tulagi Island Airport
Viru, New Georgia Island	Western		VIU	Viru Airport (Viru Harbour Airstrip)
Yandina, Mbanika Island, Russell Islands	Central Province	AGGY	XYA	Yandina Airport

== See also ==
- Transport in Solomon Islands
- List of airports by ICAO code: A#AG - Solomon Islands
- Wikipedia:WikiProject Aviation/Airline destination lists: Oceania#Solomon Islands
