= List of airports by ICAO code: A =

List of airports by ICAO code: A - B - C - D - EB-EG - EH-EY - FA-FM - FN-FZ - G - H - ~~I~~ - J - KA-KH - KI-KP - KR-KZ - LA-LJ - LK-LZ - M - N - O - P - Q - R - SA-SC - SD-SH - SI - SJ - SK-SM - SN-SP - SQ - SS-SU - SV-SY - T - U - V - W - ~~X~~ - YA-YG - YH-YQ - YR-YZ - Z

== AF - Special ==
- AFIL – Code for flight plans filed while already enroute

== AG - Solomon Islands ==
Also see airport category and list.

ICAO	IATA	Airport name	Community	Province or territory	Coordinates
AGAF	AFT	Afutara Airport	Afutara	–	09°11′28″S 160°56′57″E
AGAR	RNA	Ulawa Airport	Arona	Ulawa Island	09°51′38″S 161°58′47″E
AGAT	ATD	Uru Harbour Airport (Atoifi Airport)	Atoifi	Malaita	08°52′24″S 161°00′41″E
AGBA	VEV	Barakoma Airport	Barakoma	–	07°54′41″S 156°42′20″E
AGBT	BPF	Batuna Airport	Batuna	–	08°33′44″S 158°07′09″E
AGEV	GEF	Geva Airport	Geva	–	07°34′33″S 156°35′50″E
AGGA	AKS	Auki Gwaunaru'u Airport	Auki	–	08°41′52″S 160°40′51″E
AGGB	BNY	Bellona/Anua Airport	Bellona/Anua	–	11°18′06″S 159°47′53″E
AGGC	CHY	Choiseul Bay Airport	Choiseul Bay	Taro Island	06°42′43″S 156°23′46″E
AGGD; AGGI	MBU	Mbambanakira Airport	Mbambanakira	–	09°44′51″S 159°50′23″E
AGGE	BAS	Balalae Airport	Shortland Island	–	06°59′33″S 155°53′18″E
AGGF	FRE	Fera/Maringe Airport	Fera Island	Santa Isabel Island	08°06′26″S 159°34′39″E
AGGH	HIR	Honiara International Airport (formerly Henderson Field)	Honiara	Guadalcanal	09°25′41″S 160°03′17″E
AGGJ	AVU	Avuavu Airstrip	Avu Avu	–	09°52′05″S 160°24′37″E
AGGK	IRA	Kirakira Airport	Kirakira	–	10°26′58″S 161°53′54″E
AGGL	SCZ	Santa Cruz/Graciosa Bay/Luova Airport	Santa Cruz/Graciosa Bay/Luova	Santa Cruz Island	10°43′11″S 165°47′52″E
AGGM	MUA	Munda Airport	Munda	New Georgia Island	08°19′41″S 157°15′47″E
AGGN	GZO	Nusatupe Airport	Gizo Island	–	08°05′55″S 156°51′51″E
AGGO	MNY	Mono Airport	Mono Island	–	07°24′58″S 155°33′55″E
AGGP	PRS	Parasi Airport	Marau Sound	–	09°38′29″S 161°25′31″E
AGGQ	OTV	Ontong Java Airport	Ontong Java	–	05°30′53″S 159°31′35″E
AGGR	RNL	Rennell/Tingoa Airport	Rennell/Tingoa	Rennell Island	11°33′00″S 160°03′46″E
AGGS	EGM	Seghe Airport	Seghe	–	08°34′42″S 157°52′31″E
AGGT	NNB	Santa Ana Airport	Santa Ana	–	10°50′53″S 162°27′15″E
AGGU	RUS	Marau Airport	Marau Sound Island	–	09°51′42″S 160°49′30″E
AGGV	VAO	Suavanao Airport	Suavanao	–	07°35′09″S 158°43′53″E
AGGY	XYA	Yandina Airport	Yandina	–	09°05′34″S 159°13′08″E
AGIN	–	Isuna Heliport	Isuna	–	09°48′21″S 159°57′46″E
AGJO	JJA	Jajao Airport	Jajao	–	08°12′54″S 159°16′00″E
AGKG	KGE	Kaghau Airport	Kaghau Island	–	07°19′58″S 157°35′13″E
AGKU	KUE	Kukudu Airport	Kukudu	–	08°01′35″S 156°56′53″E
AGLM	LLM	Lomlom Airport	Lomlom	Temotu	10°17′52″S 166°19′41″E
AGOB	MHM	Manaoba Island Baenalu Airport	Malaita	–	08°19′29″S 160°48′00″E
AGOK	GTA	Gatokae Aerodrome	Gatokae	–	08°44′21″S 158°12′11″E
AGRC	RIN	Ringgi Cove Airport	Ringgi Cove	–	08°07′31″S 157°08′35″E
AGRM	RBV	Ramata Airport	Ramata Island	–	08°10′05″S 157°38′33″E
AGTI	TLG	Tulaghi Heliport	Tulagi	–	09°06′29″S 160°08′57″E
AGVH	VIU	Viru Harbour Airstrip	Viru	–	08°30′06″S 157°41′24″E

== AN - Nauru ==
Also see airport category and list.

ICAO	IATA	Airport name	Community	Province or territory	Coordinates
ANYN	INU	Nauru International Airport	Yaren	–	00°32′51″S 166°55′09″E

== AY - Papua New Guinea ==
Also see airport category and list.

ICAO	IATA	Airport name	Community	Province or territory	Coordinates
AYAA	RNA	Ama Airport	Ama	Ama	04°06′02″S 141°40′10″E
AYAF	AFR	Afore Airstrip	Afore	–	09°08′32″S 148°23′27″E
AYAG	AUP	Agaun Airport	Agaun	Milne Bay	09°55′51″S 149°23′08″E
AYAI	ATP	Aitape Airport	Aitape	Sandaun	03°08′39″S 142°20′45″E
AYAK	AIH	Aiambak Airport	Aiambak	–	07°20′33″S 141°15′59″E
AYAN	ADC	Andakombe Airport	Andakombe	–	07°08′14″S 145°44′41″E
AYAO	AIE	Aiome Airport	Aiome	–	05°08′33″S 144°43′53″E
AYAW	AWB	Awaba Airport	Awaba	–	08°00′52″S 142°45′04″E
AYAX	AEK	Aseki Airport	Aseki	–	07°21′03″S 146°11′38″E
AYAY	AYU	Aiyura Airport	Aiyura	Eastern Highlands	06°20′16″S 145°54′14″E
AYBA	VMU	Baimuru Airport	Baimuru	Gulf	07°29′41″S 144°49′22″E
AYBH	BSP	Bensbach Airport	Bensbach	–	08°51′23″S 141°15′22″E
AYBK	BUA	Buka Airport	Buka	Buka Island	05°25′14″S 154°40′33″E
AYBM	OPU	Balimo Airport	Balimo	Balimo	08°03′04″S 142°56′25″E
AYBQ	BPK	Biangabip Airport	Biangabip	–	05°31′35″S 141°44′40″E
AYBU	BUL	Bulolo Airport	Bulolo	Bulolo	07°12′58″S 146°38′58″E
AYCG	CGC	Cape Gloucester Airport	Cape Gloucester	West New Britain	05°27′33″S 148°25′57″E
AYCH	CMU	Chimbu Airport	Kundiawa	Simbu	06°01′27″S 144°58′13″E
AYDU	DAU	Daru Airport	Daru	Western	09°05′12″S 143°12′28″E
AYEE	EMI	Emirau Airport	Emirau Island	–	01°38′30″S 149°58′30″E
AYEF	EFG	Efogi Airport	Efogi	Central	09°09′20″S 147°39′36″E
AYEI		Milei Airstrip	Milei	Central	09°04′45″S 147°36′07″E
AYET	BOT	Bosset Airport	Bosset	Western	07°14′27″S 141°05′32″E
AYFA	FNE	Fane Airport	Fane	Central	08°33′04″S 147°05′07″E
AYFI	FIN	Finschhafen Airport	Finschhafen	Morobe	06°37′20″S 147°51′15″E
AYFR	FAQ	Frieda River Airport	Frieda River	Sandaun	04°36′32″S 141°57′37″E
AYGA	GKA	Goroka Airport	Goroka	–	06°04′54″S 145°23′31″E
AYGJ	GAZ	Guasopa Airport	Guasopa	Milne Bay	09°14′00″S 152°57′00″E
AYGN	GUR	Gurney Airport	Alotau	Milne Bay	10°18′41″S 150°20′01″E
AYGP	GAP	Gusap Airport	Gusap	Morobe	06°03′13″S 145°57′37″E
AYGR	PNP	Girua Airport	Popondetta	Oro	08°48′16″S 148°18′32″E
AYGT	GMI	Gasmata Airport	Gasmata	West New Britain	06°16′30″S 150°20′00″E
AYHG	HEO	Haelogo Airport	Haelogo	Central	09°08′12″S 147°35′54″E
AYHK	HKN	Hoskins Airport	Kimbe	West New Britain	05°27′44″S 150°24′18″E
AYIA	IIS	Nissan Island Airport	Nissan Island	–	04°30′00″S 154°13′36″E
AYIH	IHU	Ihu Airport	Ihu	Gulf	07°53′51″S 145°23′46″E
AYIK	ITK	Itokama Airport	Itokama	Northern	09°12′05″S 148°15′51″E
AYIQ	KIE	Aropa Airport	Kieta	–	06°18′18″S 155°43′40″E
AYJB	JAQ	Jacquinot Bay Airport	Jacquinot Bay	East New Britain	05°39′09″S 151°30′25″E
AYKA	LSA	Losuia Airport	Kiriwina	–	08°30′18″S 151°04′48″E
AYKC	KDR	Kandrian Airport	Kandrian	West New Britain	06°12′30″S 149°32′30″E
AYKI	UNG	Kiunga Airport	Kiunga	–	06°07′32″S 141°16′55″E
AYKK	KRI	Kikori Airport	Kikori	–	07°25′29″S 144°14′59″E
AYKM	KMA	Kerema Airport	Kerema	–	07°57′49″S 145°46′17″E
AYKP	KKD	Kokoda Airport	Kokoda	–	08°52′59″S 147°44′00″E
AYKQ	KGW	Kagi Airport	Kagi	Central Province	09°08′09″S 147°40′09″E
AYKS	KUY	Kamusi Airport	Kamusi	Western	07°25′11″S 143°07′20″E
AYKV	KVG	Kavieng Airport	Kavieng	New Ireland	02°34′45″S 150°48′28″E
AYKY	LNV	Lihir Island Airport	Lihir Island	–	03°02′33″S 152°37′40″E
AYLM	LMY	Lake Murray Airport	Lake Murray	–	07°00′36″S 141°29′38″E
AYMA	MRM	Manari Airport	Manare	Central	09°11′27″S 147°37′18″E
AYMC	MYX	Menyamya Airport	Menyamya	Morobe	07°12′41″S 146°01′11″E
AYMD	MAG	Madang Airport	Madang	–	05°12′30″S 145°47′00″E
AYMH	HGU	Mount Hagen Airport	Mount Hagen	Western Highlands	05°49′36″S 144°17′45″E
AYMJ	MPG	Makini Airport	Makini	Morobe	06°31′56″S 147°39′04″E
AYMK		Mok Airport	Mok	West New Britain	05°44′00″S 149°03′00″E
AYMN	MDU	Mendi Airport	Mendi	–	06°08′52″S 143°39′26″E
AYMO	MAS	Momote Airport	Los Negros Island	–	02°03′43″S 147°25′27″E
AYMR	MXH	Moro Airport	Moro	Southern Highlands	06°21′48″S 143°14′17″E
AYMS	MIS	Misima Island Airport	Misima Island	Milne Bay	10°41′21″S 152°50′17″E
AYNG	MFO	Manguna Airport	Manguna	East New Britain	05°34′40″S 151°47′33″E
AYNR	NOM	Nomad River Airport	Nomad River	Western	06°17′39″S 142°14′00″E
AYNX	ATN	Namatanai Airport	Namatanai	New Ireland	03°40′13″S 152°26′21″E
AYNZ	LAE	Lae Nadzab Airport	Lae	Morobe	06°34′11″S 146°43′34″E
AYOB	OBX	Obo Airport	Obo	–	07°35′26″S 141°19′27″E
AYPY	POM	Port Moresby International Airport	Port Moresby	National Capital	09°26′36″S 147°13′12″E
AYQQ	ONB	Ononge Airport	Ononge	Central	08°40′23″S 147°15′43″E
AYRB	~~RAB~~	Rabaul Airport (old) (destroyed)	Rabaul, New Britain	–	04°13′27″S 152°11′08″E
AYRI	KMR	Karimui Airport	Karimui	Chimbu	06°29′36″S 144°49′33″E
AYSD	SDI	Saidor Airport	Saidor	Madang	05°37′43″S 146°27′54″E
AYSK	SGK	Sangapi Airport	Sangapi	Madang	05°07′30″S 144°19′23″E
AYSM		Samberigi Airport	Samberigi	Southern Highlands	06°43′20″S 143°56′07″E
AYSS	TDS	Sasereme Airport	Sasereme	Western	07°37′22″S 142°52′08″E
AYSU	SKC	Suki Airport	Suki	Western	08°02′48″S 141°43′20″E
AYTA	TIZ	Tari Airport	Tari	Hela	05°50′42″S 142°56′53″E
AYTB	TBG	Tabubil Airport	Tabubil	Western	05°16′43″S 141°13′33″E
AYTE	TFM	Telefomin Airport	Telefomin	–	05°07′34″S 141°38′30″E
AYTI	TPI	Tapini Airport	Tapini	Central	08°21′24″S 146°59′21″E
AYTJ	TAJ	Tadji Airport	Aitape	Sandaun	03°12′00″S 142°26′00″E
AYTK	RAB	Tokua Airport	Rabaul	East New Britain	04°20′25″S 152°22′46″E
AYTN	TKW	Tekin Airport	Tekin	–	05°14′37″S 142°09′57″E
AYTS	TSW	Tsewi Airport	Tsewi	Morobe	07°04′10″S 146°07′37″E
AYTU	TFI	Tufi Airport	Tufi	Oro	09°04′33″S 149°19′12″E
AYTW	TWY	Tawa Airport	Tawa	Morobe	07°26′46″S 146°06′24″E
AYVL	TLW	Talasea Airport	Talasea	West New Britain	05°16′21″S 150°00′32″E
AYVN	VAI	Vanimo Airport	Vanimo	Sandaun	02°41′50″S 141°18′08″E
AYWB	WAO	Wabo Airport	Wabo	Gulf Province	06°59′20″S 145°04′29″E
AYWD	WBM	Wapenamanda Airport	Wapenamanda	Enga	05°38′36″S 143°53′43″E
AYWG	AGL	Wanigela Airport	Wanigela	Oro	09°20′15″S 149°09′20″E
AYWK	WWK	Wewak International Airport	Wewak	East Sepik	03°35′02″S 143°40′09″E
AYWT	WTP	Woitape Airport	Woitape	Central	08°33′45″S 147°15′09″E
AYWU	WUG	Wau Airport	Wau	Morobe	07°20′43″S 146°43′08″E
AYXP	WPM	Wipim Airport	Wipim	Western	08°47′17″S 142°52′58″E
AYYR	KSX	Yasuru Airport	Yasuru	Morobe	06°36′05″S 146°10′52″E
AYZN	SIZ	Sissano Airport	Sissano	Sandaun	02°59′57″S 142°02′40″E
