= Cyclone Namu =

South Pacific and Australian region cyclone in 1986

Severe Tropical Cyclone Namu
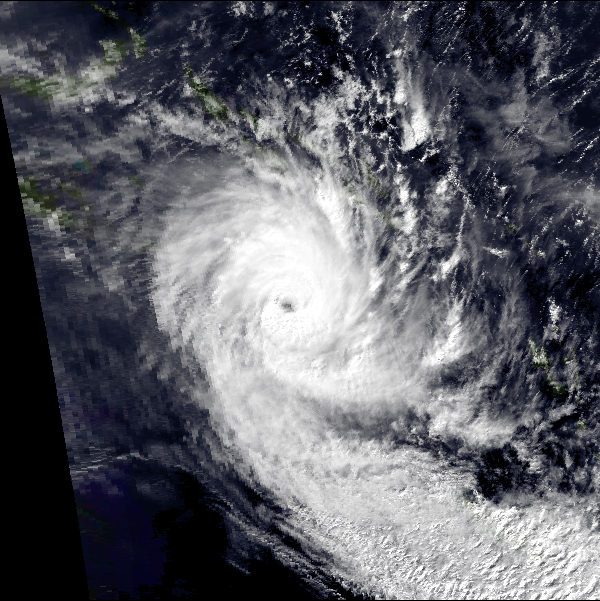
- Cyclone Namu at its peak intensity on 20 May

Meteorological history
- Formed: 15 May 1986
- Dissipated: 22 May 1986

Category 3 severe tropical cyclone
- 10-minute sustained (BOM)
- Highest winds: 130 km/h (80 mph)
- Lowest pressure: 960 hPa (mbar); 28.35 inHg

Category 3 severe tropical cyclone
- 10-minute sustained (FMS)
- Highest winds: 150 km/h (90 mph)
- Lowest pressure: 955 hPa (mbar); 28.20 inHg

Category 2-equivalent tropical cyclone
- 1-minute sustained (SSHWS/JTWC)
- Highest winds: 155 km/h (100 mph)
- Lowest pressure: 958 hPa (mbar); 28.29 inHg

Overall effects
- Fatalities: 63–150 total
- Damage: SI$25 million
- Areas affected: Solomon Islands; Vanuatu; New Caledonia
- IBTrACS
- Part of the 1985–86 South Pacific and the Australian region cyclone seasons

Severe Tropical Cyclone Namu was considered to be one of the worst tropical cyclones to impact the Solomon Islands on record, after it caused over 100 deaths within the island nations. It was first noted as a weak tropical depression to the north of the Solomon Islands during 15 May 1986. Over the next couple of days, the storm steadily intensified while meandering. After briefly moving west, the storm attained Category 2 intensity on the Australian intensity scale on 18 May, as it moved through the island chain on the next day. Cyclone Namu attained peak intensity of 150 km/h (90 mph). After retaining its peak intensity for a day, Namu turned south and weakened steadily. By 21 May, the winds of Cyclone Namu had been reduced to only 80 km/h (50 mph). Continuing to weaken, Namu turned east and dissipated on 22 May, away from the island chain.

The system impacted the Solomon Islands, Vanuatu and New Caledonia and caused over 100 deaths, as well as varying amounts of damage to the island nations. As a result, the name Namu was later retired from the lists of tropical cyclone names for the South Pacific by the World Meteorological Organization.

The storm's slow motion allowed for prolonged periods of heavy rainfall, resulting in phenomenal flooding across the Solomon Islands. The islands of Malaita and Guadalcanal experienced the most significant damage from Namu. Coastal areas of the former were severely damaged by rough seas and strong winds, especially along the eastern side where entire villages were destroyed. Meanwhile, on the island of Guadalcanal, a village of 43 people had only 5 survivors. Moreover, Cyclone Namu flooded 75% of Guadalcanal's plains. In addition, 22% of homes were either damaged or destroyed on the island.

Across the Solomon Island group, schools, buildings, electricity, water supplies, roads, communication systems, forests, and agriculture sustained widespread damage. In some regions, nearly all homes were destroyed. Mudslides destroyed roads, bridges, water pipes and drainage systems. Crops such as cocoa, copra, coffee, and rice were destroyed. Villages throughout the entire island group sustained severe damage. Overall, approximately 90,000 people, one third of the country's population, were reported as homeless. In all, Cyclone Namu was responsible for at least 150 deaths, mostly from flooding and landslides. Property damage and economic losses across the Solomon Islands totaled $25 million and $100 million (1986 USD) respectively. During the aftermath of the storm, the government of the Solomon Islands declared a national state of emergency. Meanwhile, the United Kingdom, Papua New Guinea, the United States, and Japan also sent supplies and goods to the Solomon Islands.

== Meteorological history ==
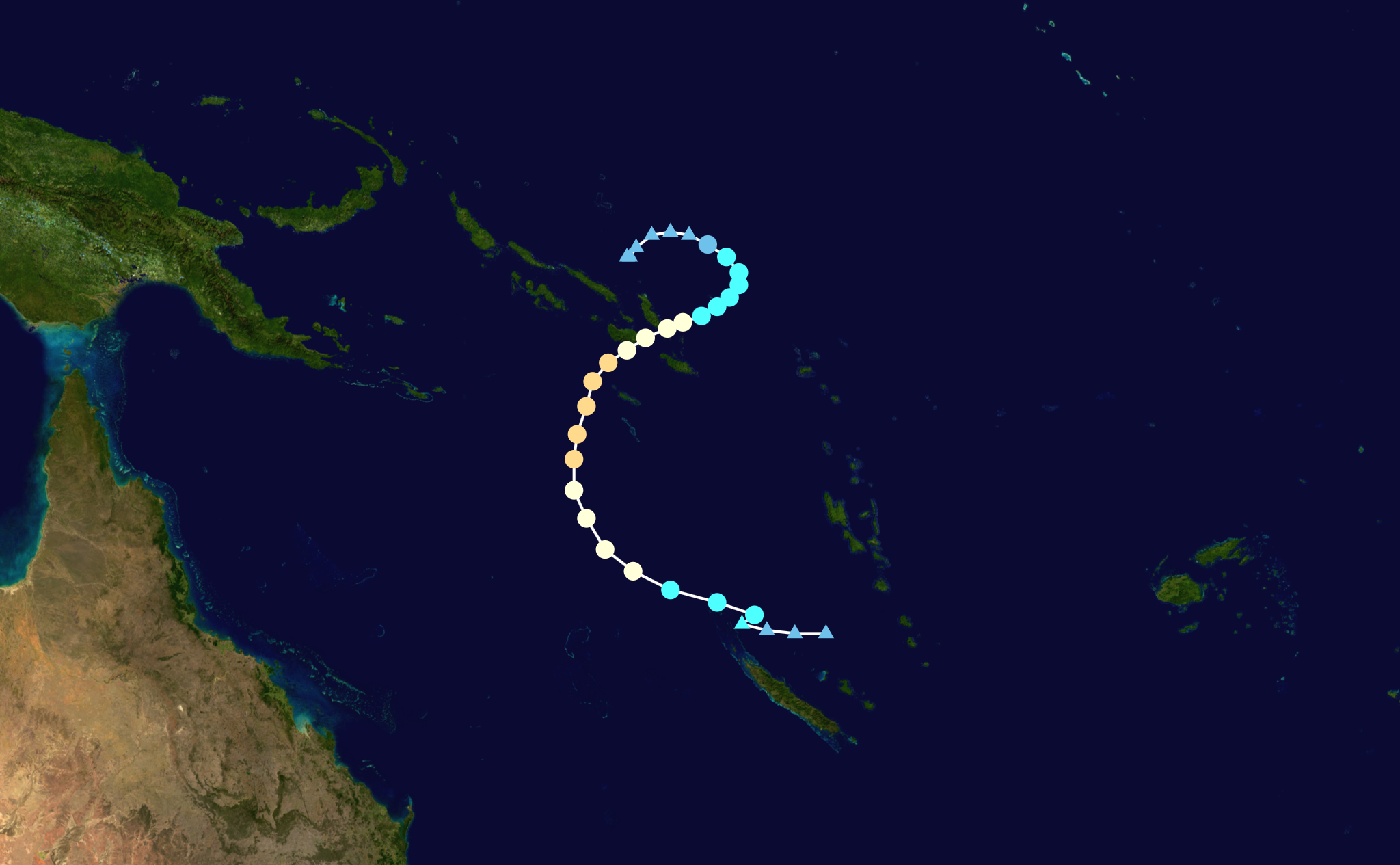
Map plotting the storm's track and intensity, according to the Saffir–Simpson scale Map key Saffir–Simpson scale Tropical depression (≤38 mph, ≤62 km/h) Tropical storm (39–73 mph, 63–118 km/h) Category 1 (74–95 mph, 119–153 km/h) Category 2 (96–110 mph, 154–177 km/h) Category 3 (111–129 mph, 178–208 km/h) Category 4 (130–156 mph, 209–251 km/h) Category 5 (≥157 mph, ≥252 km/h) Unknown Storm type Tropical cyclone Subtropical cyclone Extratropical cyclone, remnant low, tropical disturbance, or monsoon depression

On 15 May 1986, the Fiji Meteorological Service (FMS) started to publicly monitor a tropical depression that developed within a monsoon trough to the north of Malaita in the Solomon Islands. The system initially moved eastwards away from the archipelago and showed signs of weakening, as clouds associated with the system dissipated and there were no banding features present. As a result, the FMS was doubtful about the presence of gale-force winds and suspended issuing warnings on the system but continued to monitor it. During 17 May, the system showed signs of reintensifying as it turned and started to move south-westwards back towards the island nation. Later that day, the United States Joint Typhoon Warning Center (JTWC) initiated advisories on it and designated it as Tropical Cyclone 33P, before the FMS reinitiated advisories on the system as it started to rapidly intensify. At around 21:00 UTC (08:00 SIT, 18 May), the FMS determined that the depression had become a tropical cyclone and named it Namu. After being named, Namu intensified as it moved south-westwards towards the Solomon Islands before it passed near or over Manawai Harbour on Malaita at about 14:00 UTC (01:00 SIT, 19 May). The system subsequently changed direction and moved southwards parallel to Malaita's east coast before it crossed the island to the north of Maka.

After crossing Malaita, Namu emerged into the Indispensable Strait, where it was thought to have developed a small ring of marginal hurricane-force winds. According to eyewitness reports obtained after the event, the system made landfall on the island of Guadalcanal near the Marau Sound at about 16:00 UTC (03:00 SIT). Around two hours later, the FMS reported that Namu had peaked with 10-minute sustained winds of 150 km/h (90 mph), which made it a Category 3 severe tropical cyclone on the modern-day Australian scale. While over Guadalcanal, the system appeared to slow down or become near-stationary for three hours as it approached Avuavu before it turned and moved southwards into the Solomon Sea on 19 May. After entering the Solomon Sea, Namu moved out of the South Pacific tropical cyclone basin and into the Australian region, where the Australian Bureau of Meteorology took over the primary warning responsibility from the FMS. The system subsequently passed about 35 km (25 mi) to the northwest of Bellona as it came under the influence of westerly winds that steered it southeastwards. On 20 May, a broad and ragged eye appeared on satellite imagery; however, it quickly became obscured by high clouds. Later that day, the JTWC reported that Namu had peaked with 1-minute sustained wind speeds of 155 km/h (100 mph), which made it a Category 2 hurricane on the Saffir-Simpson hurricane wind scale. During the following day, the system moved back into the South Pacific basin, where it passed to the northeast of Noumea in New Caledonia and rapidly weakened into a depression as it interacted with cooler air. The system was subsequently lost by the FMS during 22 May as it merged with an eastwards-moving trough near southern Vanuatu, before the system was last noted by the JTWC during the following day.

== Effects ==
Namu's main effects were felt in the Solomon Islands, where at least 100 people were reported dead, while the cyclone also caused heavy rainfall and various road closures in New Caledonia. The system was also expected to affect southern Vanuatu, which prompted the FMS to issue special weather bulletins for the island nation on 21 May; however, these were terminated later that day as Namu rapidly weakened.

=== Solomon Islands ===
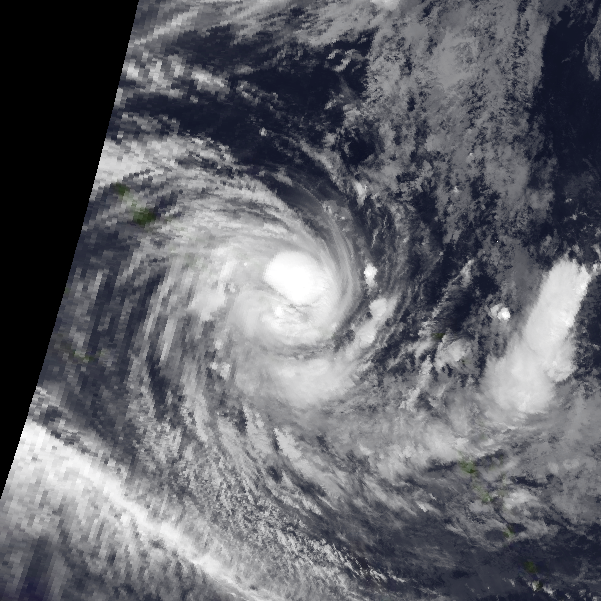
Namu moving over the Solomon Islands on 18 May

Namu caused over 100 deaths, thousands of injuries and widespread damage to electrical and water supplies, buildings, crops, roads, communication systems and forests, leaving over 90 000 people homeless.

==== Preps ====
The FMS began issuing special weather bulletins for the Solomon Islands Meteorological Service (SIMS) on 15 May, advising that the system had gale-force winds associated with it and would affect Malaita and smaller islands. However, these bulletins were suspended the next day after the system weakened and it became doubtful that any gales were associated with the depression. After the depression was named Namu on 17 May, the FMS resumed issuing special weather bulletins, which advised the SIMS of the threat posed by Namu to the island nation. Over the next few days, these bulletins were revised accordingly and advised the SIMS which areas would be affected by gale-, storm- and hurricane-force winds and the threat of flooding from rain or storm surge. These bulletins were then used by the SIMS to prepare various gale and tropical cyclone warnings, which were broadcast in both English and Pidgin by the Solomon Islands Broadcasting Corporation. Initially, expectations were for a run-of-the-mill tropical cyclone of moderate intensity to impact the Solomon Islands.

As the system approached and moved over the island nation on 18 May, the National Disaster Council was convened to oversee the relief effort. Ahead of the system's impact on Guadalcanal, authorities decided to close Henderson Field to civilian aircraft, while the Honiara Central Hospital evacuated patients, as the hospital was located on a coastal strip that was vulnerable to river flooding and seawater inundation.

==== Weather ====
Namu impacted the Solomon Islands between 18 and 21 May with torrential and prolonged rainfall, high seas, gale- to hurricane-force winds and gusts of over 150 km/h (93 mph), which caused flooding, landslides, mudslides, tidal and wind surges throughout the island nation. In particular, the FMS estimated that storm- or hurricane-force winds had impacted Malaita, Guadalcanal, Bellona as well as other smaller islands that Namu's center had passed within 50 to 65 km (30 to 40 mi) of. They also estimated that gale-force winds had impacted the area between San Cristóbal, the Russell Islands and Santa Isabel. However, the FMS noted that most of the deaths and damage were caused by Namu's slow movement across the island nation, which brought prolonged torrential rainfall, flooding and mudslides. It was later estimated that parts of Guadalcanal had received over 600 mm (24 in) of rainfall, while the weather station at Henderson Field recorded a rainfall total of 353 mm (13.9 in) between 18 and 21 May. Flooding caused meandering rivers to cut straight paths, bringing tons of mud, silt and waste debris to rich farming areas and swamping rice crops under floodwaters. Many people were caught off guard by the cyclone's sudden increase in winds and the prolonged heavy rain, especially in remote areas where weather forecasts were difficult to disseminate because of communication problems.

==== Sikaiana ====
On 17 May, as Namu moved southwestwards, Sikaiana became the first atoll impacted, where the storm destroyed traditional houses made of palm fronds. Additionally, the storm surge washed over the island and polluted wells, which compounded ongoing problems with access to freshwater. Reports indicated that the islanders relied on coconut milk over the following weeks until HMAS Brunei delivered relief supplies and over 200 drums of freshwater on 4 June.

==== Malaita ====
After impacting Sikaiana, Namu moved south-westwards towards the southern part of Malaita, where it seemed to slow down and remain near-stationary for around five hours. High winds associated with Namu, damaged roofs and defoliated the hills over central, southern and western Malaita, while waves damaged the coastline.

==== Gudalcanal ====
Within the island nation meandering rivers changed their course and cut a straight path, which brought mud, silt and debris to rich farming areas. The floods also exposed a site of an American and Japanese World War 2 ammunition dump on Guadalcanal from Henderson Field to Red Beach.

==== Rennell and Bellona ====
Namu passed just to the west of the Rennell and Bellona Province, with both islands in the province feeling the effects of the cyclone. On Rennell Island, 20 houses were destroyed while both the school and the airstrip were damaged by storm surge, high winds and heavy rain. The damage to Bellona was considered more serious with 160 traditional houses destroyed by storm surge, high winds and heavy rain.

==== Impact ====
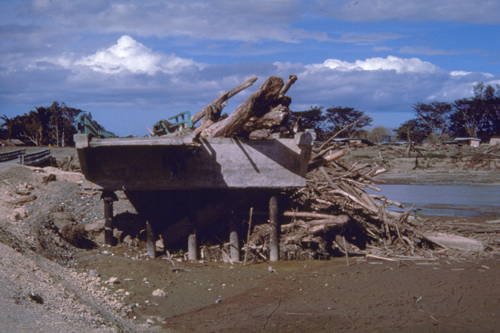
Bridge damaged by Namu

Along the eastern coast of the island, damage was massive; entire villages were destroyed. Gardens were devastated and walking pathways were blocked. In Babanakira, 5 people died.

On the island of Guadalcanal, a single mudslide was responsible for killing 38 villagers. Of the 43 people that lived in the small town of Valebaibai, only 5 survived, all of whom narrowly escaped. Moreover, 14 dead bodies were found in the central and southern areas of Guadalcanal on 21 May when flood waters began to recede.

Deep flood water covered 75% of the island's (Guadalcanal) coastal plain these waters cut off channels and destroyed coastal villages. Furthermore, the Lungga, Ngalimbiu, Mberande, and Nggurambusu rivers sustained the worst flood damage; water depth in some of the aforementioned rivers reached 8 m (26 ft). Many trees were brought down due to high winds. Also, numerous plantations were destroyed across the island. However, little beach erosion occurred on the island. Moreover, 22% of homes on the island were either damaged or destroyed. One bridge was also destroyed on the island. Offshore Honiara, the capital of the nation, two ships [one was 60 ft (20 m) long and the other was 120 ft (35 m) long] each sank during the storm. Throughout the capital, several schools were destroyed. The two bridges that connected the city with the island of Guadalcanal were destroyed, thus leaving Honiara isolated. Furthermore, about 5,000 homeless were left homeless across the city, 2,000 of whom sought refuge in a local college due to the storm. Although no people were to have confirmed to have died in the city, five children were reported missing in one of the capital's suburbs, Ngalimera.

In both Guadalacal and Malatia, extensive areas of irrigated rice crops were submerged under floodwaters and mud. In some areas, nearly all homes were destroyed. Mudslides and logs destroyed roads, bridges, water pipes and drainage systems. Crops such as cocoa, copra, coffee, and rice were destroyed, resulting in thousands of dollars in damage. Additionally, communication between the outer and island of the Solomon group was completely destroyed.

In all, approximately 90,000 people, one third of the country's population, were reportedly homeless. Of the 25,000 "traditional" houses on the Solomon Island, 6,000 (26%) were destroyed. Most of the fatalities were due to landslides and flooding. Property damaged totaled $25 million (1986 USD) and the storm also caused US $100 million in economic losses in the Solomon Islands.

==== Death toll ====
Namu is commonly thought to have caused 150 deaths when it impacted the Solomon Islands; however, this death toll is disputed, with different totals listed in reliable sources. In December 1986, the Solomon Islands National Disaster Council published its final report on the system, which stated that Namu had caused about 103 deaths; however, only 63 of these were documented as dead or missing. In July 1991, Russell Blong and Deirdre Radford of Macquarie University published the results of an extensive survey of natural disasters in the Solomon Islands, which "positively identified" 111 deaths directly associated with Cyclone Namu.

== Aftermath ==
During 19 May, the Government of the Solomon Islands declared a state of national disaster and decided that the emergency period would run until 31 May. These aircraft arrived during 21 May, when Henderson Field Airport reopened for emergency operations, after flood waters had receded and the mud and debris had been removed.

Within a week following the storm, access to fresh water was resorted to the archipelago; doctors believed that had these services not been restored, widespread disease would have been reported. The government declared 2 June a national day of mourning for the victims of the storm.

During 26 May, Henderson Field was reopened for commercial flights

Moreover, a commercial aircraft provided supplies to the 200 inhabitants of Sikiana Island, which had run out of food a week after the storm. In all, a total of 17 coastal trading vessels, four helicopters, and six aircraft were used to transport food, tents and medical supplies to the needy. It was estimated that the homeless would require aid such as food for six months.

Elsewhere, in Honiara, the local ministry asked each resident to pay $50 so that the roofs that were damaged by the system could be repaired. The cleanup process took a long time; a year after the storm, bulldozers were reportedly still removing broken logs and not all roads had been repaired. Following the storm, disease spread to isolated part of the Solomon Islands; many animals died and hundreds of children were hospitalised because of the outbreak of disease.

In the initial aftermath of the system, residents tried to help themselves by patching up water pipes with bamboo, string and rubber strips.

=== International aid ===
Initially the Solomon Islands Government made bilateral requests for food, blankets, medical supplies, clothing and kitchen utensils to Australia, New Zealand and the United Nations.

However, it did not formally request the United Nations Disaster Relief Organisation to launch an international appeal for disaster relief until 23 May.

New Zealand subsequently donated an initial NZ$1 million, while the Australian High Commission subsequently donated an initial AU$1.2 million worth of relief supplies. This included two C-130 Hercules cargo planes from the Royal Australian Air Force, a detachment party, relief supplies and two Iroquois helicopters.

On 23 May the European Commission granted the island nation €100,000 (SB$154,221) to purchase basic necessities.

The International Monetary Fund loaned $1.3 million USD to the nation. Australian relief planes had dropped food to 4,000 victims in the highlands on the main island of Guadalcanal and New Zealand provided nearly 30,000 lb (13,610 kg) of rice, canned meat and tea to the devastated region. New Zealand engineers were brought in to assess damage to roads and bridges and start removal of 40 ft (10 m) high debris along the waterfronts of the island chain. Other countries, including the United Kingdom, Papua New Guinea, the United States, and Japan also sent supplies and goods to the Solomon Islands. Overall, US$8.6 million was provided to the Solomons and 71,000 lb (32,205 kg) worth of supplies were provided to victims of the cyclone.

== Medical assistance ==
As a result of damage to health facilities and fears of outbreaks of malaria, dysentery and other diseases, the Solomon Islands Government requested medical personnel and equipment from the international community. Japan and New Zealand responded by sending medical teams to Avuavu and western Guadalcanal, while the Australian Defence Force started preparing to send a team on 25 May in response to a specific request from the National Disaster Council. Around the same time, the Royal Australian Air Force requested to deploy a team primarily to report on the health of deployed personnel, with the capacity to assist other medical teams if needed.

== Longer-term aftermath ==
On 4 June, the Government of the Solomon Islands lifted the emergency period, four weeks after the system had impacted the islands. After the emergency period was lifted, outside assistance that had been brought in to assist with relief efforts were gradually withdrawn, including armed services from Australia and New Zealand. However, external assistance from Australia and New Zealand amongst others, was still needed due to the Solomon Islands reliance on overseas aid in general. As a result, a two-day meeting took place in Honiara during July, at which the Solomon Islands Government requested and was promised about 13.5 million for 20 rehabilitation programs. Pledges of assistance were made by Australia, Britain, New Zealand, the European Economic Community and agencies of the United Nations and the United States of America. These programs included projects to replace rural primary schools flattened by the cyclone, bridges and water supply systems swept away by Namu.

During March 1987, volunteers from the Australian Rotarians, commenced an eighteen-month project to build 93 schools in the Solomon Islands.

Questions were raised during the systems aftermath over whether or not excessive deforestation worsened the impact of the flood. The government denied reports that deforestation had any link to the catastrophe.

In October 1986, the European Commission decided to pay the island nation an €8 million (SB$12.3 million) advance to help cover a €18 million (SB$27.8 million) loss in export earnings for copra and palm products.

In January 1987, the European Commission approved a €1.72 million (SB$3.66 million) grant from the European Development Fund to improve, restore and rehabilitate rural infrastructure damaged by the cyclone.

=== French aid ===
During December 1986, the then Solomon Islands Prime Minister Sir Peter Kenilorea resigned, after allegations surfaced that he had channelled aid from France for Cyclone Namu towards the rebuilding of his village. However, the allegation was never proven.

== See also ==
- Cyclone Zoe - impacted the Solomon Islands as a Category 5 severe tropical cyclone.
- List of off-season South Pacific tropical cyclones
- List of wettest tropical cyclones
