= Solomon Airlines =

Flag carrier of Solomon Islands

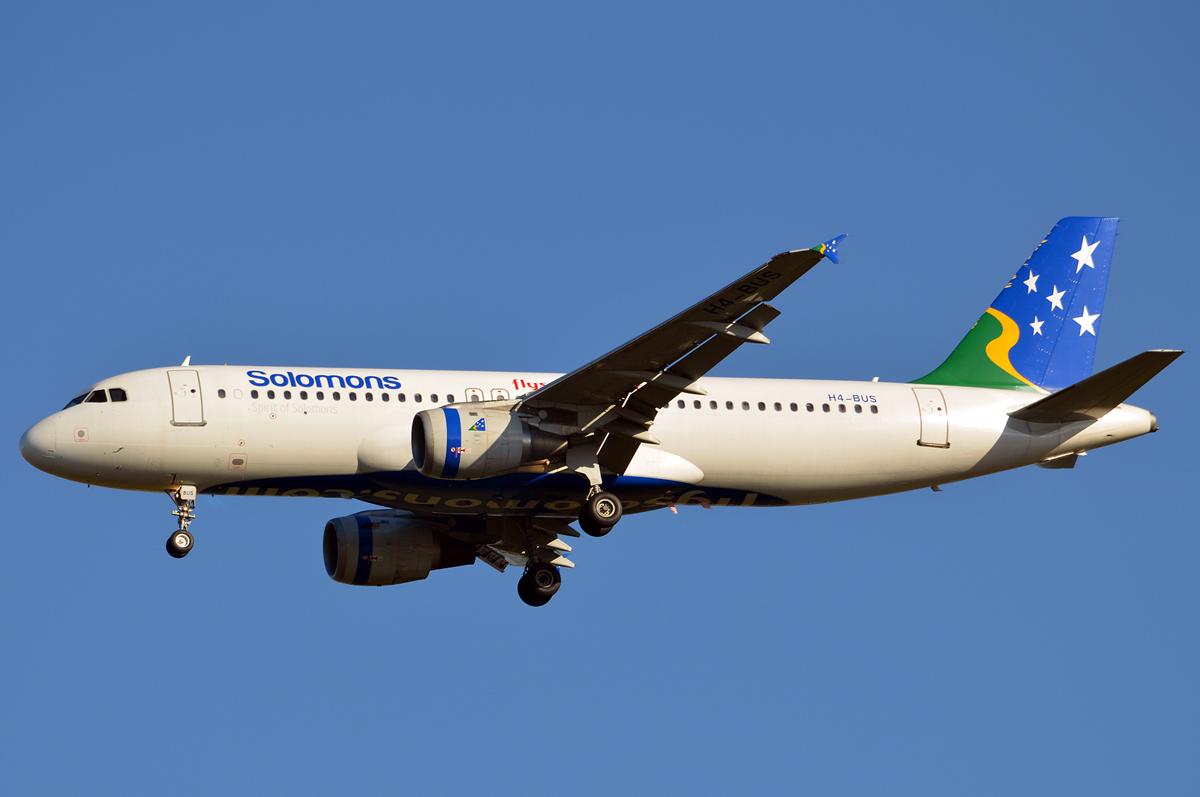
IATA	ICAO	Call sign
IE	SOL	SOLOMON
- Founded: 1962; 64 years ago
- Hubs: Honiara International Airport
- Fleet size: 7
- Destinations: 33
- Headquarters: Honiara, Solomon Islands
- Key people: Matthew Findlay (CEO)
- Website: www.flysolomons.com

Solomon Airlines is the flag carrier of Solomon Islands, based in Honiara.

== History ==
Solomon Airlines was established in 1962 as a charter airline by Laurie Crowley. Crowley had a charter operation in Papua New Guinea with occasional charter flights to the Solomons using a single Piper Aztec. As no commercial aircraft were based in Solomon Islands, Crowley decided to start an airline and called it Megapode Airlines.

Papua New Guinea-based Macair purchased Megapode in 1968, and changed the airline's name to Solomon Islands Airways, with the acronym of SOLAIR, and changed the operation from a charter airline to a regular schedule. Under Macair, SOLAIR served the island of Bougainville, Papua New Guinea, with two De Havilland Doves and two Beechcraft Barons.

In 1975, Macair (including its SOLAIR subsidiary) were bought by Dennis Buchanan, owner of Talair in Papua New Guinea, and in 1976, the airline received two Beechcraft Queen Air 80 airplanes. At the time, the Solomon Islands Government bought 49 percent of the airline's shares and with rights to purchase the remaining 51 percent by the next five years.

For the next five years, growth was slow but steady. A brand new Fairchild Swearingen Metroliner was bought, and services were established to Vanuatu.

In 1984, the government decided to purchase all of the airline's remaining shares, and two De Havilland Canada DHC-6 Twin Otters and one Embraer EMB 110 Bandeirante were leased from Talair. Soon after full government take-over, the three leased planes were returned. In 1987, the sale of the airline and its assets Pacific Car Rental (a subsidiary of Avis) and the tour company Hunts of the Pacific, were completed.

The new ownership was met with skepticism and distrust by airline workers, and many trained personnel left the company, including some on the managerial level. The government was faced with the task of rebuilding the airline, and it started doing so by investing 2 million dollars to buy two DHC-6-300 Twin Otters. Soon, a new livery was introduced, and the name was changed to "Solomon Airlines" officially.

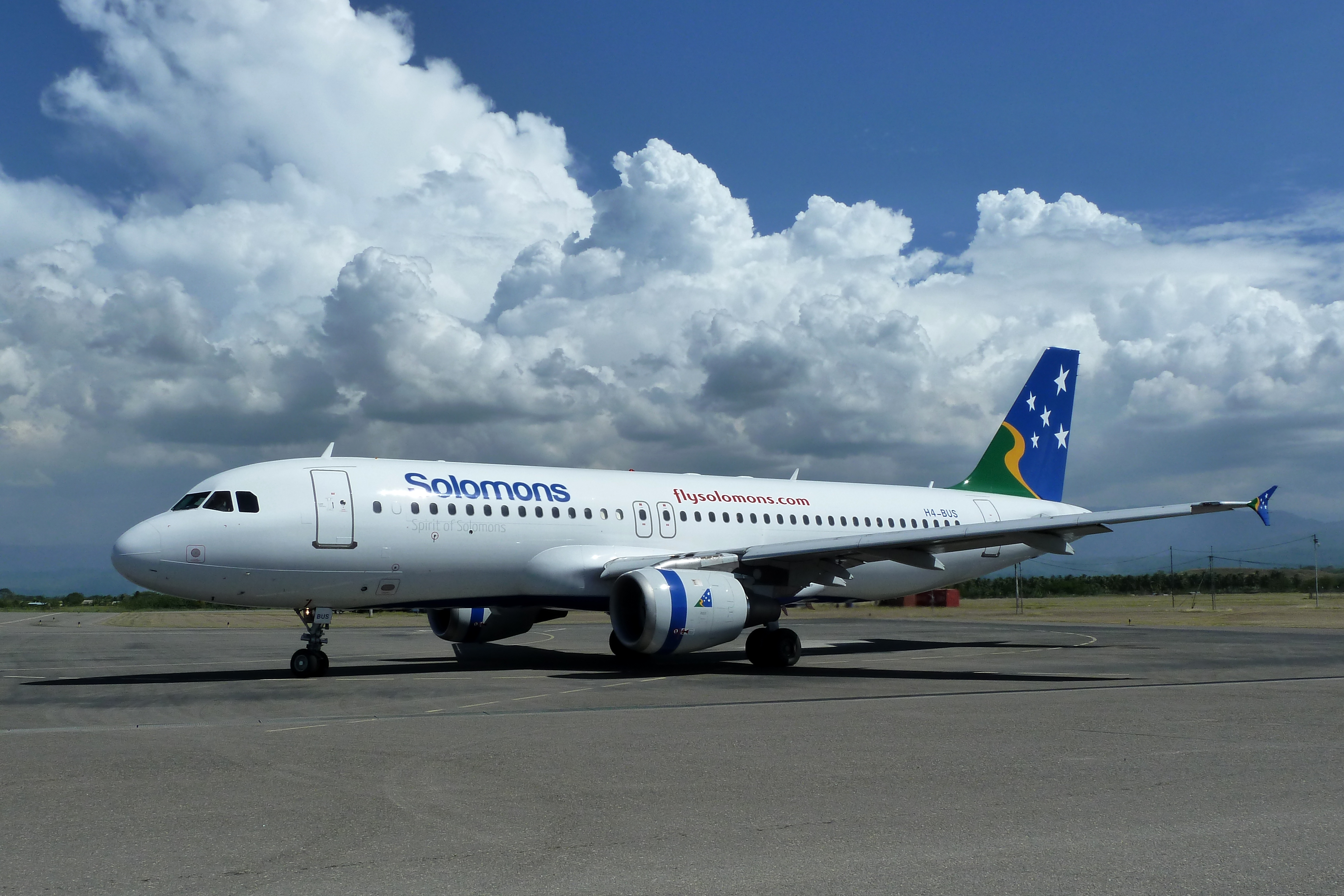
Solomon Airlines Airbus A320-211 at Honiara International Airport in 2012

A joint venture with Qantas followed, and then Solomon Airlines entered the jet age by leasing a Boeing 737 from Air Pacific. Solomon Airlines and Air Pacific soon also made a joint venture, but when Air Pacific announced in 1989 it was planning to substitute its Boeing 737 with a Boeing 767 to upgrade international services, Solomon Airlines was forced to lease one from another company, and so it decided on leasing a 737 owned by International Lease Finance Corporation. Since then, the airline has operated with leased 737s alongside its own turbo-props.

In 1999, after ethnic violence broke out in the Solomons, the United Nations imposed sanctions which severely damaged the airline's international operations, and at one point, the airline was forced to retain only is scheduled services to Brisbane. Since the end of the conflict, the airline has reestablished its international network.

In November 2006, Solomon Airlines obtained a Boeing B737-300 aircraft including pilots and cabin crew, leased by the Spanish AirClass Airways.

For the months of January and February 2009, Solomon Airlines leased a De Havilland Canada Dash 8 seating 40, from Vincent Aviation of Wellington, New Zealand while one of its Twin Otter aircraft was undergoing heavy maintenance at Honiara.

In August 2009, Solomon Airlines obtained an Airbus A320-200 aircraft including pilots, leased by Strategic Airlines. When the lease with Strategic Airlines expired Solomon Airlines acquired an Airbus A320-211 and obtained its own Air Operators Certificate.

On 7 June 2016, Solomon Airlines suspended all operations, including international and domestic flights and ground operations, stranding passengers at Honiara. The airline's CEO, Ron Sum Sum, said that the grounding was caused by the government's failure to pay millions of dollars in arrears. The airline resumed operations two days later.

On 12 May 2023, CEO Gus Kraus confirmed that the airline was looking to acquire a second A320-200 to expand services and cater to an expected increase in demand from the 2023 Pacific Games to be held in Honiara later in the year.

On 22 May 2024, Solomon Airlines began launching weekly direct flights between Auckland, New Zealand and Port Vila, Vanuatu to fill the gap caused by the bankruptcy of Vanuatuan national carrier, Air Vanuatu. New Zealand has several Vanuatuan RSE (Recognised Seasonal Employer) workers who were stranded because of Air Vanuatu's liquidation.

On 19 January 2026, Solomon Airlines announced direct flights between Christchurch, New Zealand and Port Vila, Vanuatu set to commence in July 2026.

== Destinations ==
Solomon Airlines currently operates regular return services from Honiara to Brisbane, Nadi, Port Vila, Port Moresby (codeshare only), and Tarawa, Kiribati.

Solomon Airlines also operates an extensive domestic network around Solomon Islands.

=== Current destinations ===
Country	City	Airport	Notes	Refs
Australia	Brisbane	Brisbane Airport		
Australia	Sydney	Sydney Airport	Suspended	
Fiji	Nadi	Nadi International Airport	via Port Vila	
Kiribati	Tarawa	Bonriki International Airport		
New Zealand	Auckland	Auckland Airport	via Port Vila	
New Zealand	Christchurch	Christchurch Airport	Terminated	
Papua New Guinea	Port Moresby	Port Moresby International Airport		
Solomon Islands	Atoifi	Uru Harbour Airport		
Solomon Islands	Auki	Auki Gwaunaru'u Airport		
Solomon Islands	Avu Avu	Avu Avu Airport		
Solomon Islands	Balalae	Balalae Airport		
Solomon Islands	Bellona Island	Bellona/Anua Airport		
Solomon Islands	Choiseul Bay	Choiseul Bay Airport		
Solomon Islands	Fera Island	Fera Airport		
Solomon Islands	Gizo	Nusatupe Airport		
Solomon Islands	Honiara	Honiara International Airport	Hub	
Solomon Islands	Kaghau	Kaghau Airport		
Solomon Islands	Kirakira	Kirakira Airport		
Solomon Islands	Marau	Marau Airport		
Solomon Islands	Mbambanakira	Mbambanakira Airport		
Solomon Islands	Mono	Mono Airport		
Solomon Islands	Munda	Munda International Airport		
Solomon Islands	Ngatokae	Gatokae Aerodrome		
Solomon Islands	Ontong Java	Ontong Java Airport		
Solomon Islands	South Malaita	Parasi Airport		
Solomon Islands	Ramata	Ramata Airport		
Solomon Islands	Rennell	Rennell/Tingoa Airport		
Solomon Islands	Santa Ana	Santa Ana Airport		
Solomon Islands	Santa Cruz Islands	Santa Cruz/Graciosa Bay/Luova Airport		
Solomon Islands	Seghe	Seghe Airport		
Solomon Islands	Suavanao	Suavanao Airport		
Solomon Islands	Ulawa Island	Ulawa Airport		
Solomon Islands	Yandina	Yandina Airport		
Vanuatu	Espiritu Santo	Santo International Airport		
Vanuatu	Port Vila	Bauerfield International Airport		

=== Codeshare agreements ===
Solomon Airlines has codeshare agreements with the following airlines:

- Air Kiribati
- Air Niugini
- Air Vanuatu
- Fiji Airways
- Qantas

== Livery ==
The airline's original livery consisted of an overall white fuselage, with a cheatline extending up onto the vertical fin in colours mirroring those of the national flag. The vertical fin was mainly royal blue, with five white stars prominently displayed. The single word "Solomons" was carried above the window line forward, along with the national flag.

With the acquisition of the Airbus A320 in 2011 a decision was made to "refresh" the livery. The new livery consists of an all-white fuselage with the single word "Solomons" carried above the forward windows and "Spirit of Solomons" in grey below the forward window line. The tail and winglets have a stylised version of the national flag. The underside of the fuselage has a large white flysolomons.com on a blue background.

== Fleet ==
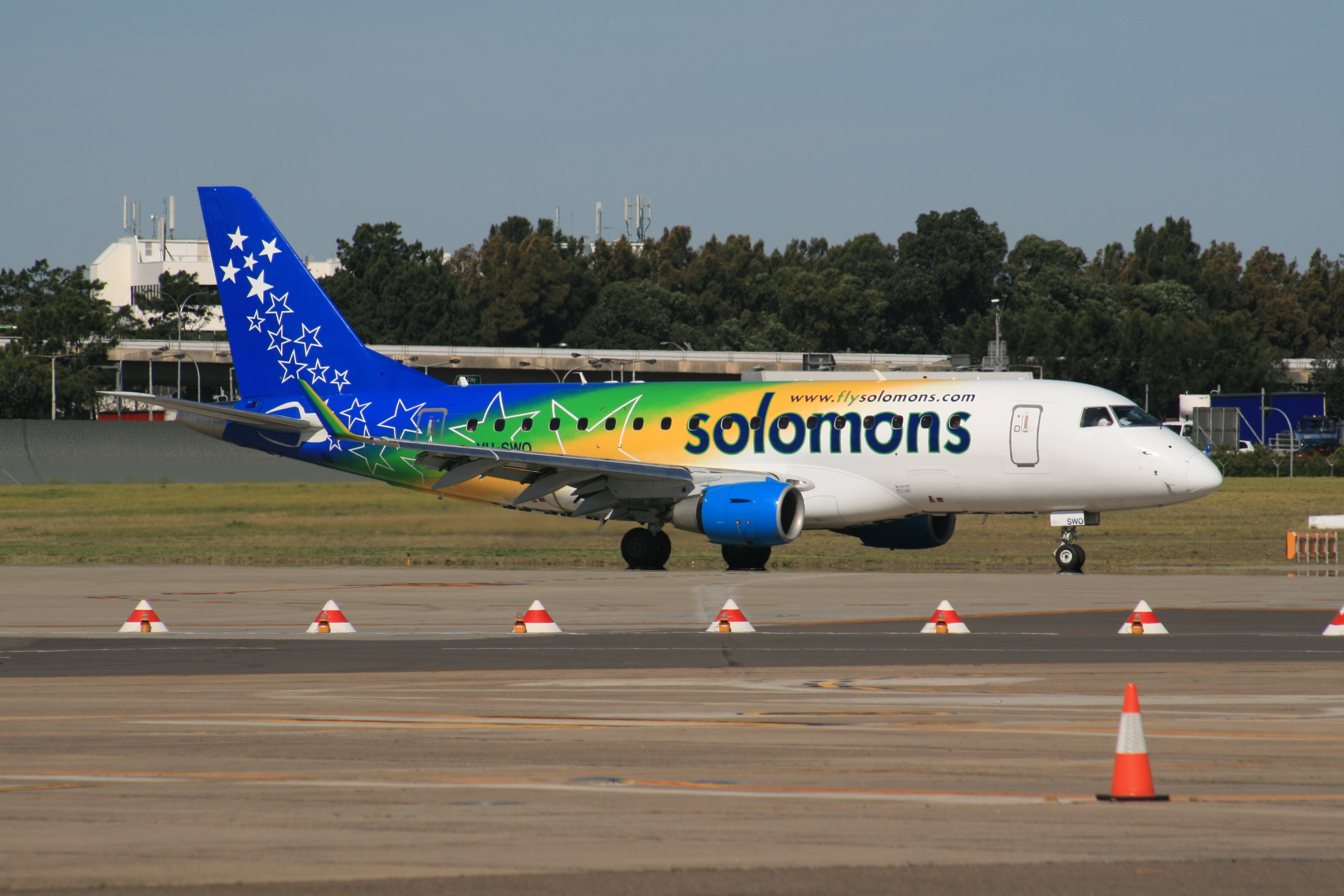
Solomon Airlines Embraer E170 on wet-lease during 2007

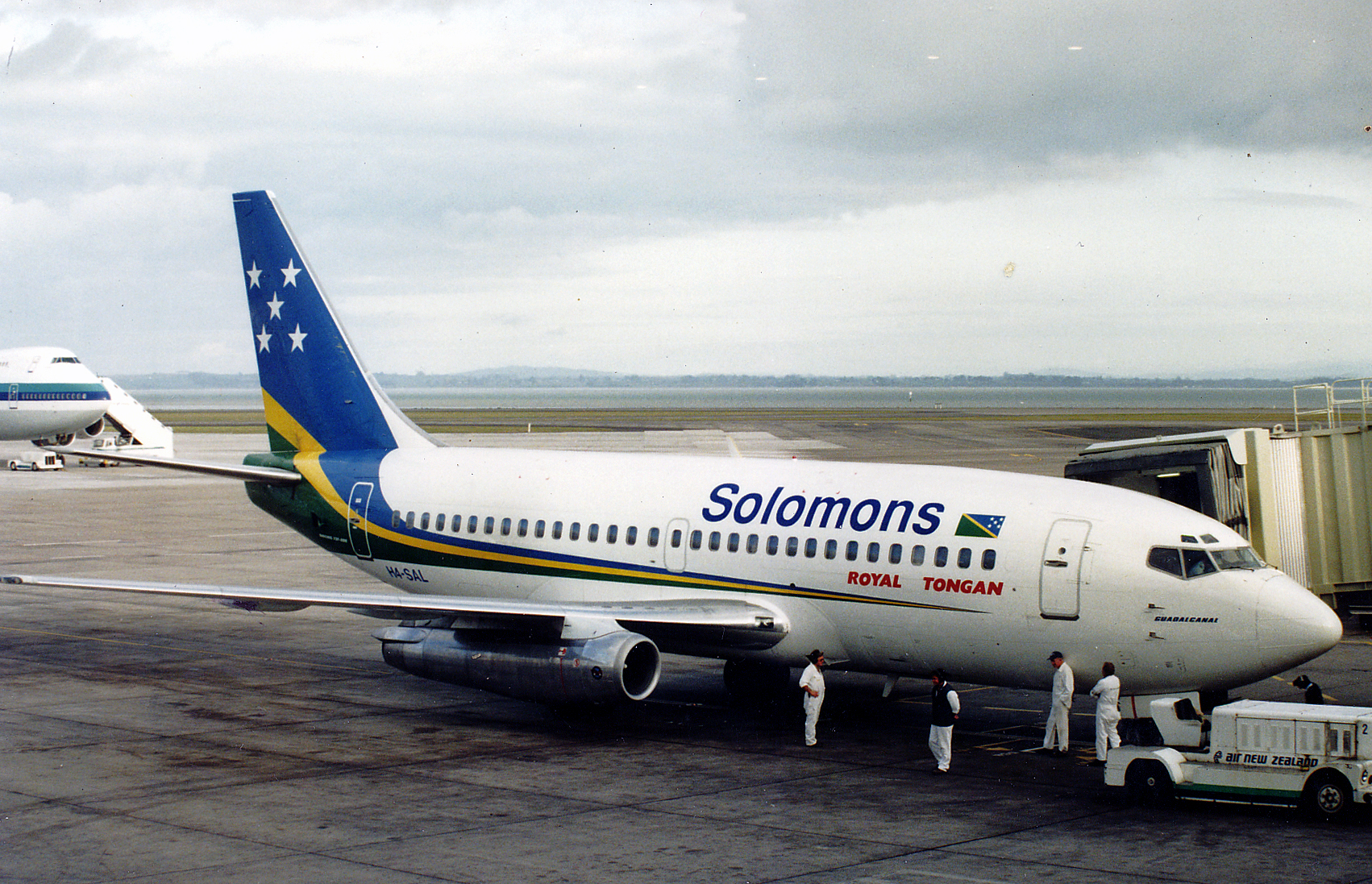
Solomon Airlines operated the Boeing 737 seen at Auckland Airport in 2000

As of August 2025, Solomon Airlines operates the following aircraft:

Solomon Airlines fleet
Aircraft	In service	Orders	Passengers	Notes
Airbus A320-200	2	—		
De Havilland Canada DHC-6-300 Twin Otter	4	—		
De Havilland Canada DHC-8-100	1	—		
Total	7	—		

=== Historical fleet ===
In the past, Solomon Airlines operated:

- Boeing 737-200
- Boeing 737-300
- Boeing 737-400
- Embraer E170

== Accidents ==
Solomon Airlines have lost two aircraft during their history. These were a BN-2A Islander in 1978 near Bellona Island and a DH6 Twin Otter in 1991 over Guadalcanal, resulting in 26 fatalities.
