= Choiseul Bay Airport =

- IATA: CHY; ICAO: AGGC

Summary
- Airport type: Public
- Location: Choiseul Bay, Taro Island, Solomon Islands
- Coordinates: 06°42′43″S 156°23′46″E

Map
- Location within Solomon Islands

Choiseul Bay Airport (IATA: CHY, ICAO: AGGC) is an airport at Choiseul Bay on Taro Island, part of the Choiseul Province in the Solomon Islands.

The airport has scheduled flights provided by Solomon Airlines, using DHC-6 Twin Otter aircraft.

== Airlines and destinations ==
Solomon Airlines connects Choiseul Airport to Nusatupe Airport (Gizo) and Honiara International Airport.

== See also ==
- List of airports in the Solomon Islands
