= Ramata =

Ramata may refer to:

- Ramata (film), a 2007 feature-length fiction film directed by Léandre-Alain Baker
- Ramata Airport, an airport on Ramata Island in the Solomon Islands
- Ramata Diakité, a Malian Wassoulou musician
- Ramata Island, an island in the Solomon Islands
- Ramata parish, an administrative unit of the Valmiera district, Latvia
- Ramatha, a former Roman Catholic titular bishopric in Palestine
