= Kologhona =

- Village
- Location in Guadalcanal
- Coordinates: 9°44′23″S 159°50′10″E
- Country: Solomon Islands
- Province: Guadalcanal
- Island: Guadalcanal
- Time zone: UTC+11 (UTC)
- Climate: Af

Kologhona is a small town on the southern side of Guadalcanal, Solomon Islands, to the north of Mbolonda Bay. The Itina River flows nearby and it is served by Mbambanakira Airport.
