= RBV =

RBV may refer to:

- Ramata Airport (IATA airport code RBV), Ramata Island, Solomon Islands
- Reserve Bank of Vanuatu, the central bank of Vanuatu
- Resource-based view, a managerial framework used to determine the strategic resources a firm can exploit to achieve sustainable competitive advantage
