= MNY =

MNY or mny may refer to:

- Manyawa language (ISO 639-3: mny)
- Mono Airport (IATA: MNY)
- Maybelline New York
