= KGE =

KGE may refer to:

- KGE, the IATA code for Kaghau Airport, an airport on Kaghau Island in the Solomon Islands
- KGE, the National Rail code for Kingsknowe railway station, Edinburgh, Scotland
- Komering language, which has the ISO 639 language code kge
