= Santa Ana Airport =

Santa Ana Airport may refer to:

- Santa Ana Airport (Colombia) in Cartago, a city in the Valle del Cauca Department of Colombia
- Santa Ana Airport (Solomon Islands) on Santa Ana, an island in the Makira-Ulawa Province of the Solomon Islands
- John Wayne Airport (SNA), in Santa Ana, Orange County, California, United States
- Santa Ana del Yacuma Airport in Santa Ana del Yacuma, Bolivia
