= Munda Airport =

International airport in Munda, Solomon Islands

Munda International Airport
- IATA: MUA; ICAO: AGGM

Summary
- Serves: Munda
- Location: New Georgia
- Elevation AMSL: 10 ft (3.0 m)
- Coordinates: 08°19′40.69″S 157°15′47.13″E
- Interactive map of Munda International Airport

Runways
Direction	Length		Surface
Direction	ft	m	Surface
07/25	6,890	2,100	Asphalt

Munda International Airport (IATA: MUA, ICAO: AGGM) is an international airport adjacent to the town of Munda, Western Province in Solomon Islands.

Originally built by Japanese forces during World War II and further developed by the U. S. Naval Construction Battalions 24 and 73 following its capture. After the war, the airfield became a commercial airport for regional flights. In 2013, a US$20 million New Zealand government aid and development project significantly modernized and repaired the air strip, which was in disrepair. The upgrade included the removal of a large amount of unexploded ordnance left behind by vacating Japanese and US forces. In 2019, $6 million in further upgrades were funded by the New Zealand government in order to upgrade the airport to international standards, allowing the airport to receive international flights. The main economic purpose of the upgrade is to serve as an alternate field for international flights to Honiara International Airport, significantly reducing the fuel load and improving the economics of the flight. For example, prior to the Munda upgrade, a flight from Brisbane to Honiara had to carry sufficient fuel to return to Brisbane because that was the nearest viable alternate.

In 2023, a new international terminal building was opened.

In 2024, the airport saw its first international flights from Brisbane.

== Airlines and destinations ==
Solomon Airlines connects Munda Airport to Brisbane Airport (in Australia), Balalae Airport, Nusatupe Airport (Gizo), Honiara International Airport, Mono Airport, Ramata Airport, Seghe Airport, and Suavanao Airport.

=== World War II ===
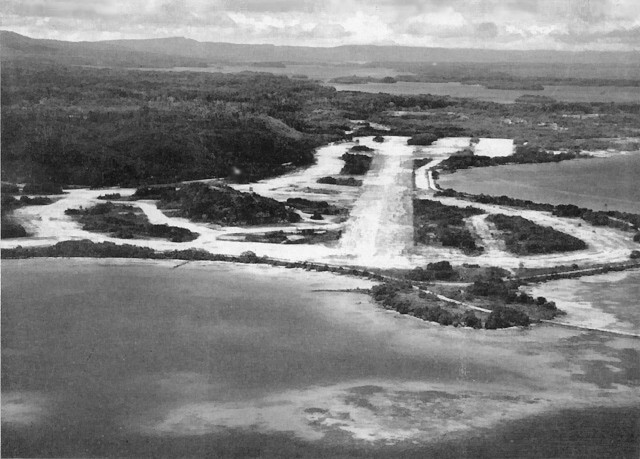
Looking eastward, over Munda Field, toward the scene of battle, this post-war picture shows how the jungle has already begun to encroach on what was the busiest Allied airstrip in the Solomons. Within a year dense vegetation had already obscured Bibilo Hill, while once bare Kokengolo (to the centre left of the photograph) sprouts a thick growth.

The Munda Point airfield was first built in World War II by Japanese forces. A Japanese directive in late October 1942 called for an air base to be built at Munda Point, about 150 miles (240 km) northwest of Guadalcanal and Henderson Field.

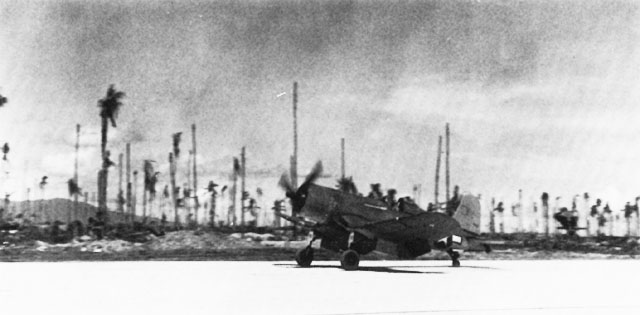
The first fighter plane to land on Munda was a VMF-215 Corsair flown by Maj Robert G. Owens, Jr., on August 14, 1943.

Construction began in mid-November with a great emphasis on keeping the forward airfield secret. The majority of the airfield work was done before clearing the main runway and surfacing it with crushed coral. By wiring the tops of palm trees to keep them in place, allowing work to initially escape detection. Finally the trunks were cut away, and runway completed.

Despite these efforts, reports of the strip were relayed to Guadalcanal via a Solomon Island coastwatcher resident in Munda, Danny Kennedy, who notified the British Solomon Island Defence Force in Honiara by radio. Subsequent aerial reconnaissance spotted increased barge traffic and evidence of crushed coral being prepared at the strip, but the Japanese succeeded in buying enough time to complete a single 1,094 feet (333 m) by 44 feet (13 m) all weather runway for fighters operational on 17 December 1942.

Opened on 1 December 1942, it was used by the Japanese Navy and Japanese Army Air Force as a forward operating base. As soon as it was operational, the airfield was hampered by the observation of Australian, New Zealand and Solomon Islander coastwatchers in the area, including Kennedy and D.C. Horton who was observing the airfield from Rendova. It was heavily bombed from the air by the Allies prior to the American landing.

Munda airfield, also known as Munda or Munda Point Airfield, was the principal objective of the New Georgia campaign. Following the Allied Landings on Rendova on 30 June 1943, the Drive on Munda Point during July and the Japanese New Georgia counterattack in Mid-July, Munda airfield was captured by the US Army XIV Corps forces after fierce fighting in the jungle area. The high ground around the airfield was captured on August 5, 1943.

Once seized, Seabees from the 47th and 63rd Naval Construction Battalions improved and expanded the airbase for U.S. operations. The first American aircraft landed at Munda on August 14, 1943 with landings by F4U Corsairs piloted by Robert Owen of VMF-215, a 44th Fighter Squadron (44th FS) P-40 Warhawk and a J2F Duck with Marine Brigadier General Francis P. Mulcahy aboard.

Known American air units stationed at Munda Airfield were:

- United States Navy

VC-24 operating SBDs
VC-40 operating TBFs
VF-33 operating F6Fs
VF-38 operating F6Fs
CASU 14 (Carrier Aircraft Service Unit)
VB-98 operating SBDs
VB-148 operating PV-1s
VB-140 operating PV-1s

- United States Army Air Forces

5th Bombardment Group, 4 February-7 April 1944
307th Bombardment Group, 28 January-29 April 1944

- United States Marine Corps

ComAir New Georgia
VMSB-236 operating SBDs
VMF-124 operating F4Us
VMF-213 operating F4Us
VMF-214 operating F4Us
VMF-215 operating F4Us
VMF-221 operating F4Us
MABS-1
VMSB-142 operating SBDs
VMTB-232 operating TBFs
VMSB-341 operating SBDs
VMTB-143 operating TBFs

== See also ==
- Ondonga Airfield
- USAAF in the South Pacific
