= Seghe Airport =

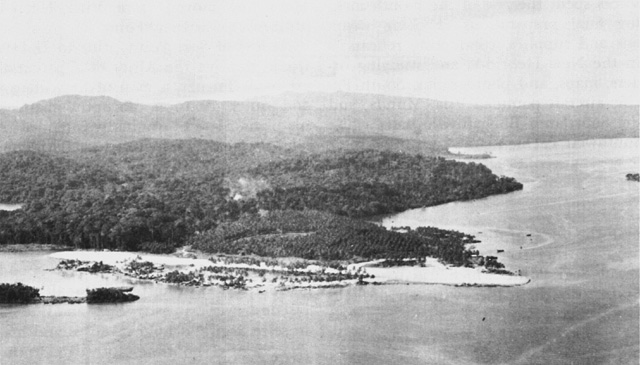
- Aerial view of Segi Point Airfield (1940s)
- IATA: EGM; ICAO: AGGS

Summary
- Location: Seghe, Solomon Islands
- Coordinates: 8°34′42″S 157°52′31″E
- Interactive map of Seghe Airport

Seghe Airport is an airport in Seghe in the Solomon Islands (IATA: EGM, ICAO: AGGS).

The Segi Point area was secured by the 4th Marine Raider Battalion on 30 June 1943 in the opening phase of the New Georgia Campaign. The 47th Naval Construction Battalion (Seabees) landed with the Marines and immediately began construction of a fighter airstrip. Bad weather and poor soil conditions delayed construction, but by 18 July a coral-surfaced 3,300 feet (1,000 m) by 150 feet (46 m) runway was ready for use. By the end of July taxiways and revetments had been completed. In August the runway was widened to 200 feet (61 m) and two 42,000 US gallons (160,000 L; 35,000 imp gal) gas tanks had been constructed and by September 52 hardstands had been completed.

The field was then used as a fighter strip to support the Rendova and Munda Point Landings.

USAAF units based at Segi Point included:

- 44th Pursuit Squadron operating P-40s

US Navy units based at Segi Point included:

- VB-305 operating SBDs
- VF-33 operating F6Fs
- VF-38 operating F6Fs
- VF-40 operating F6Fs

== Airlines and destinations ==
Solomon Airlines connects Seghe Airport to Nusatupe Airport (Gizo), Honiara International Airport, and Munda Airport.
