= Anuha Island Resort =

Resort in the Solomon Islands

Coordinates: 9°00′S 160°10′E

Anuha Island Resort is located on Anuha Island in the Florida Group in the Solomon Islands and is pronounced Anuca by the locals. The Island itself is located approximately 35 miles from Honiara, and approximately 15 minutes from Henderson airfield. The resort was burned down over a land ownership dispute in 1988. More recently, plans have existed to re-open the resort under the legal ownership and guidance of the Solomon Island Tourism Ltd group. Private security forces are included in the redevelopment plan.

Anuha Island is surrounded by a shallow lagoon, leading out to a surrounding coral reef. Anuha Island remains a popular dive location with nearby wrecks at Guadalcanal.

As of 2014, Anuha Island is under the legal ownership of Solomon Island Tourism Ltd and is moving forward with redevelopment plans.

== Resort history ==
The resort was styled in timber, thatching and bamboo - Melanesian style. Accommodation was offered through exclusive private villas with ocean views, individually decorated by the locals. The central resort area comprised a reception, boutique shop, main restaurant and cocktail bar, and outdoor eating areas and pool area.

The resort was successfully developed and managed by Pacific Resorts Ltd in 1983, by Queensland based businessmen, John Donnelly and Peter Cornish. It was a major draw-card for tourism in the region. Ownership later changed hands over the course of the Resort's history. Anuha Island Resort played host to a number of well-known celebrities. Transportation to the resort was through Anuha's private airline and its own charter boat fleet. The resort generated its own electricity and water supply.

== Sources ==
- Sofield, T.H.B.: 'Anuha Island Resort: A Case Study Of Failure', in R. Butler and T. Hinch (editors), 'Tourism and Indigenous People', London, Routledge, 1996.
- Anuha Island Resort website.
- Smith Plans Injunction Against Sky Airworld Plans, Solomon Times Online, 16 December 2008.
- Sofield, Trevor H. B. (2003). Empowerment for Sustainable Tourism Development. Emerald Group Publishing. p. 235. ISBN 978-0-08-043946-4.
