= Penjuku =

- Coordinates: 8°46′09″S 158°08′11″E
- Country: Solomon Islands
- Province: Western Province

Penjuku is a coastal village on the island Nggatokae of the New Georgia Group in Western Province, Solomon Islands. The estimated terrain elevation above sea level is some 7 meters.
