= Anua Airport =

Airport in Bellona Island, Solomon Islands

Bellona/Anua Airport
- IATA: BNY; ICAO: AGGB

Summary
- Location: Bellona Island
- Coordinates: 11°18′06″S 159°47′53″E
- Interactive map of Bellona/Anua Airport

Bellona/Anua Airport is an airport on Bellona Island in the Solomon Islands (IATA: BNY, ICAO: AGGB).

== Airlines and destinations ==
Solomon Airlines connects Anua Airport to Honiara International Airport and Rennell/Tingoa Airport.
