= List of cities, towns and villages in Solomon Islands =

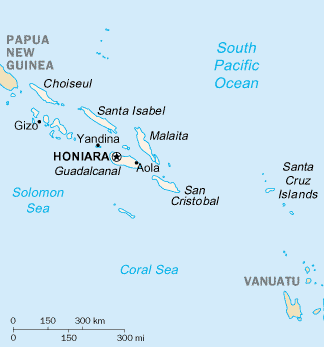
A map of Solomon Islands.

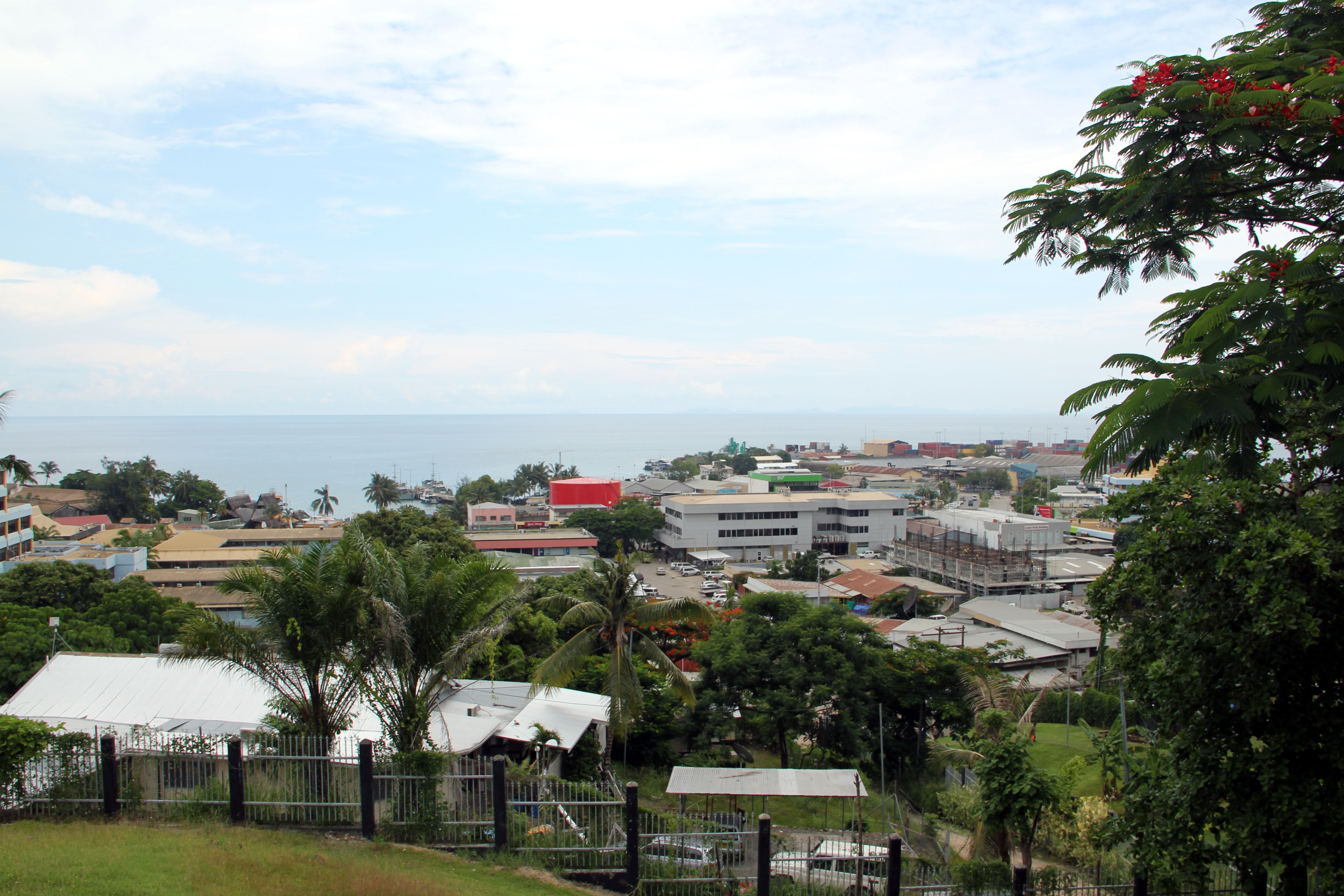
The capital, Honiara.

This is a list of populated places in the nation state of Solomon Islands, it excludes areas within the Solomon Islands archipelago that fall under a different jurisdiction, such as Bougainville.

The nation only has one metropolitan area as of 2019, the Honiara Urban Area. This had a population of 169,721 in 2019, and includes the entire capital territory, and the Guadalcanal Province wards of Tandai and Malango.

== Populated places ==
City, town or village	Coordinates	Census 2019	Island	Province
Auki (ʻAoke)	8°46′S 160°42′E	7,020	Malaita	Malaita Province
Buala	8°10′S 159°37′E	1,342	Santa Isabel	Isabel Province
Gizo (Ghizo)	8°06′S 156°51′E	4,260	Ghizo Island	Western Province
Honiara	9°26′S 159°55′E	129,569	Guadalcanal	Guadalcanal Province
Kirakira	10°26′S 161°53′E	2,107	Makira	Makira-Ulawa Province
Lata	10°43′S 165°50′E	1,806	Nendö	Temotu Province
Malango	9°26′S 160°3′E	15,560	Guadalcanal	Guadalcanal Province
Munda	8°20′S 157°16′E	1,748	New Georgia	Western Province
Noro	8°13′S 157°13′E	7,204	New Georgia	Western Province
Nusa Roviana	8°21′S 157°19′E	1,396	Roviana	Western Province
Tandai	9°27′S 159°57′E	24,592	Guadalcanal	Guadalcanal Province
Taro Island	6°43′S 156°26′E	1,053	Taro Island	Choiseul Province
Tigoa (Tingoa)	11°32′S 160°02′E	881	Rennell Island (Mungaba)	Rennell and Bellona Province
Tulagi (Tulaghi)	9°05′S 160°09′E	1,481	Tulagi	Central Province
