= Auki Gwaunaru'u Airport =

Airport in Auki / Gwaunaru'u, Solomon Islands

- IATA: AKS; ICAO: AGGA

Summary
- Location: Auki / Gwaunaru'u
- Elevation AMSL: 5 ft (1.5 m)
- Coordinates: 8°41′52″S 160°40′51″E
- Interactive map of Auki Gwaunaru'u Airport

Runways
Direction	Length		Surface
Direction	ft	m	Surface
	3,100	945

Auki Gwaunaru'u Airport (IATA: AKS, ICAO: AGGA) is an airport located a dozen kilometers to the north of Auki, which is the capital of the Malaita Province on the north-west coast of Malaita Island, one of the largest among the Solomon Islands.

== Airlines and destinations ==
Solomon Airlines connects Auki Airport to Uru Harbour Airport (Atoifi), Honiara International Airport, and Manaoba Airport.
