= Luova Airport =

Airport in Santa Cruz Islands, Solomon Islands

- IATA: SCZ; ICAO: AGGL

Summary
- Location: Santa Cruz Islands
- Coordinates: 10°43′11″S 165°47′52″E
- Interactive map of Luova Airport

Santa Cruz/Graciosa Bay/Luova Airport is an airport serving Nendo, the largest of the Santa Cruz Islands, in the Solomon Islands (IATA: SCZ, ICAO: AGGL).

The airport is served by Solomon Airlines, which has flights on Tuesdays and Fridays.

== Airlines and destinations ==
Solomon Airlines connects Luova Airport to Honiara International Airport and Lomlom Airport.
