= Balalae Airport =

- IATA: BAS; ICAO: AGGE

Summary
- Airport type: Grass airstrip suits STOL Twin Otter aircraft has forest either side, station building is a small rain shelter with bench seats. No roads, serviced by outboard dinghies for transport to surrounding island communities
- Owner: local community of shortland islands western province
- Operator: Solomon Airlines
- Serves: Among other centres, Nila rural training centre -Shortland Island
- Location: Balalae Island, shortland Western Province, Solomon Islands
- Coordinates: 6°59′33″S 155°53′18″E
- Interactive map of Balalae Airport

Balalae Airport is a small civil airport on Balalae Island operated by Solomon Airlines. It is located in the northwest of the Solomon Islands, part of the Shortland Islands and south of Bougainville Island (IATA: BAS, ICAO: AGGE). It serves the nearby Shortland Islands and Fauro Island. It's a 1.75 km long sandy coral airstrip only 5 feet (or 1.5 meters) above sea level with a small customs area. It was built by prisoners of war, mostly British captured during the siege of Singapore, under the command of the Japanese during their occupation of the Solomons to protect the stronghold of Rabaul. In about June 1943, all Allied prisoners remaining on the island were killed and buried in mass graves. 436 bodies of unidentified soldiers were exhumed post-war. During 1943, Isoroku Yamamoto planned to arrive on the airport from Rabaul to increase morale after the defeat at the Battle of Guadalcanal. He was shot down while passing Bougainville Island during Operation Vengeance, during the Guadalcanal campaign.

== Airlines and destinations ==
Solomon Airlines connects Balalae Airport to Nusatupe Airport (Gizo), Mono Airport, and Munda Airport.
