= Transport in Solomon Islands =

Most internal transport in Solomon Islands is conducted through boat travel between islands. Road transport infrastructure is rudimentary, with few paved roads.

The state of the country's transportation infrastructure has been a priority for a number of international development projects. In 2018, the Asian Development Bank began a comprehensive Land and Maritime Connectivity Project in the islands, to provide long term support to the country's transportation infrastructure. After commuters complained about poor public bus services in the capital city, in 2025, the Japan International Cooperation Agency launched the Capacity Improvement of Urban Transport Management Project in Honiara, to establish a safe and convenient bus system for the city's residents. In June 2025, the Australian government committed SBD 60 million to upgrade the country's road infrastructure.

== Statistics ==
Railways: 0 km

Highways:
total: 1,360 km
paved: 33 km
unpaved: 1,327 km (includes about 800 km of private plantation roads) (2002)

Ports and harbors: Aola Bay, Honiara, Lofung, Noro, Viru Harbor, Yandina

Merchant marine: none (1999 est.)

Airports: 36 (2012)

Airports - with paved runways:
total: 1
1,524 to 2,437 m: 1 (Honiara International Airport) (2012)

Airports - with unpaved runways:
total: 35
1,524 to 2,437 m: 1
914 to 1,523 m: 9
under 914 m: 25 (2012)

Heliports
total: 3 (2012)
