= Tingoa Airport =

Airport in Solomon Islands

Rennell/Tingoa Airport
- IATA: RNL; ICAO: AGGR

Summary
- Serves: Tigoa, Rennell Island, Solomon Islands
- Elevation AMSL: 20 m (66 ft)
- Coordinates: 11°33′00″S 160°03′46″E

Map
- Location of the airport in Solomon Islands

Runways
Direction	Length		Surface
Direction	m	ft	Surface
12/30	672	2,206	Grass
- Sources: GCM, STV

Rennell/Tingoa Airport is an airport in Tigoa on Rennell Island in the Solomon Islands (IATA: RNL, ICAO: AGGR).

== Airlines and destinations ==
Solomon Airlines connects Tingoa Airport to Bellona/Anua Airport and Honiara International Airport.
