= Taro Island =

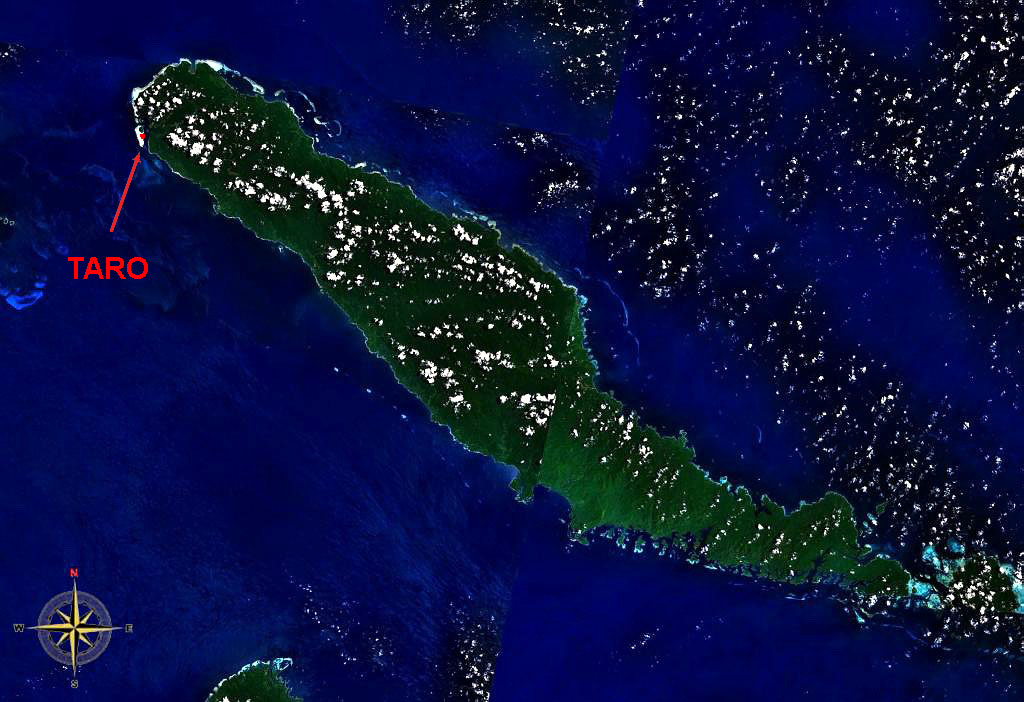
- Taro, in red left, and Choiseul, centre.

- Location in Solomon Islands
- Coordinates: 06°42′41″S 156°23′47″E
- Country: Solomon Islands
- Province: Choiseul

Area
  - Total: 0.44 km^{2} (0.17 sq mi)
- Elevation: 2 m (6.6 ft)

Population (2019)
  - Total: 1,053
  - Density: 2,400/km^{2} (6,200/sq mi)

Taro Island is a small island in Solomon Islands with 1,053 inhabitants as of 2019. It is the capital of Choiseul Province and is located in Choiseul Bay off the northwest coast of Choiseul Island. The island, which averages 2 meters (6 ft 7 in) above sea level, is threatened by rising sea levels.

== History ==
In 1994, work on a new town, Choiseul Bay Town, was started, but it has received little support from the government of the Solomon Islands. The Sui River flows through the area, which is a swampy forest with mangroves. The land the project sits on can accommodate around 5,000 people.

A tsunami created by the 2007 Solomon Islands earthquake hit the island, but no one was killed. Islanders found shelter on the area where Choiseul Bay Town is meant to be built.

== Geography ==
Taro Island is 100 acres in size. The island is less than 2 meters (6 ft 7 in) above sea level. Only 5% of the island, two hectares, is higher than 3 metres above sea level. Rising sea levels threaten to submerge the island.

In 2016, John A. Church, Colin Woodroffe, and other Australian researchers from CSIRO predicted that Taro Island would become the first provincial capital globally to relocate residents and services due to the threat of sea level rise.

== Government ==
Taro Island is the capital of the Choiseul Province, which was created in 1992. Jackson Kiloe was elected premier of the island in 1999.

== Infrastructure ==
The island had a hospital, police station, school, courthouse, and four churches in 2015. There are three streets. Choiseul Bay Airport is located on the island and is serviced by Solomon Airlines. 24-hour access to electricity first occurred on the island in the 2010s after solar panels were installed.

== Demographics ==
There were around 600 permanent residents in 2015. In 2019, the island had a population of 800 to 1,200. There were 1,053 residents in Taro As of 2019.

== Works cited ==
=== News ===
- "The vanishing island". The Sydney Morning Herald. 2015. Archived from the original on 9 July 2025.
- Rowling, Megan (15 August 2014). "Township in Solomon Islands Is 1st in Pacific to Relocate Due to Climate Change". Scientific American. Archived from the original on 10 July 2025.

=== Web ===
- "Solomon Islands". Solomon Airlines. Archived from the original on 27 January 2007.
- "The relocation of Taro Island". Architectural League of New York. 1 October 2019. Archived from the original on 9 July 2025.
