= Suavanao Airport =

Airport in Solomon Islands

- IATA: VAO; ICAO: AGGV

Summary
- Location: Suavanao, Solomon Islands
- Coordinates: 7°35′09″S 158°43′53″E
- Interactive map of Suavanao Airport

Suavanao Airport is an airport on Santa Isabel Island in the Solomon Islands (IATA: VAO, ICAO: AGGV).

It has a short, unpaved airstrip that can only be used by small aircraft. Near the airstrip, there is a small wooden cabin with no electricity or means of communication with the mainland.

Used mainly by residents of Santa Isabel Island, the airport is served by Solomon Airlines, with one flight a week most of the year. The main destination from Suavanao Airport is Honiara. It also provides a fast connection to a resort on Papatura Island.

== Airlines and destinations ==
Solomon Airlines connects Suavanao Airport to Fera Airport, Honiara International Airport, Kagau Island Airport, and Munda Airport.
