= Fera Airport =

- IATA: FRE; ICAO: AGGF

Summary
- Location: Fera Island, Solomon Islands
- Coordinates: 8°06′26″S 159°34′39″E
- Interactive map of Fera Airport

Fera Airport is an airport on Fera Island in the Solomon Islands (IATA: FRE, ICAO: AGGF). The airport is a roughly 3,000 foot long grass strip, and there are no roads to and from the terminal block, which was completed in April 2012. It is a 15-minute boat ride to Buala on Santa Isabel Island. Solomon Airlines flies to Fera three times weekly from Honiara.

== Airlines and destinations ==
Solomon Airlines connects Fera Airport to Honiara International Airport and Suavanao Airport.
