= Kirakira Airport =

Kirakira Airport Ngorangora Airstrip
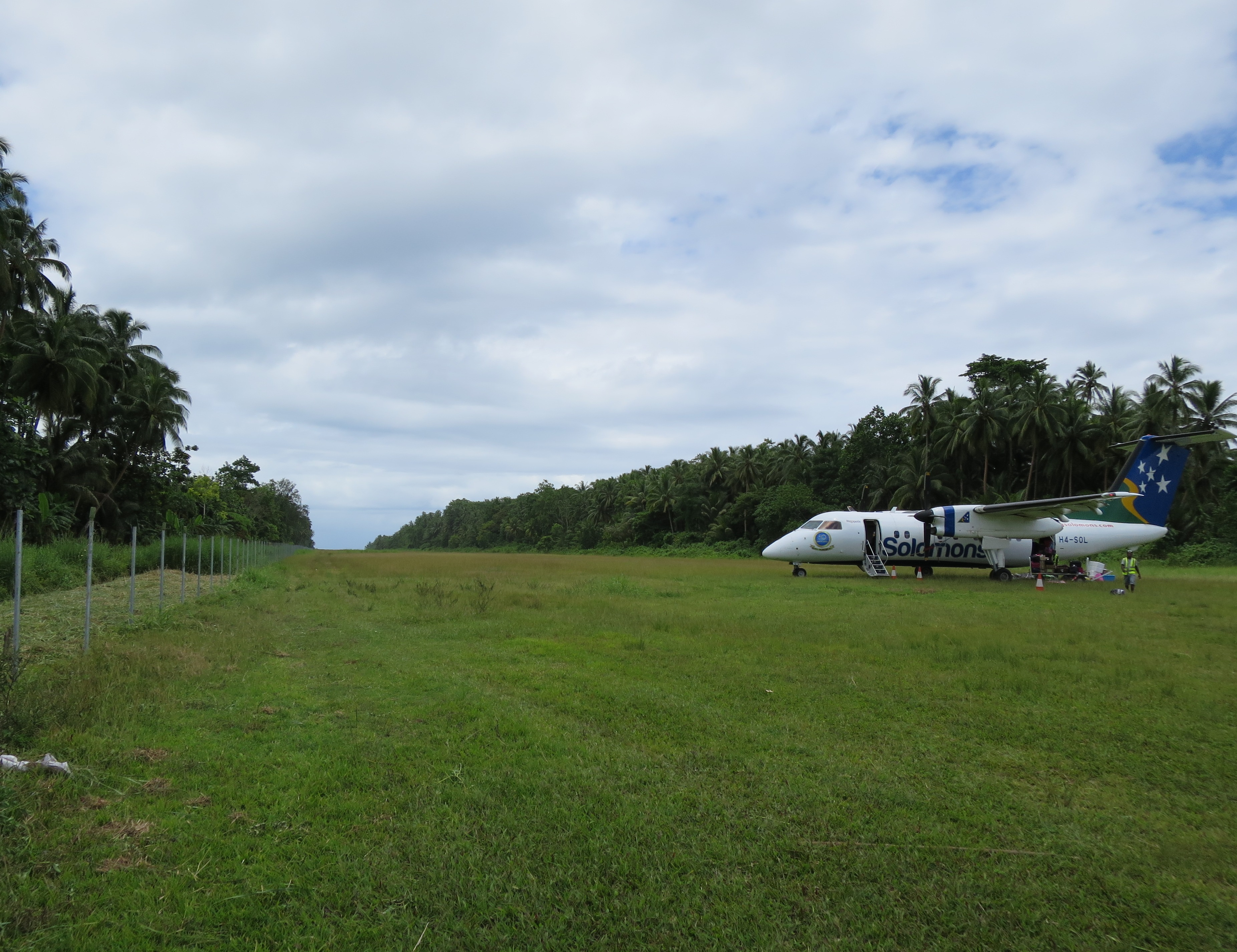
- IATA: IRA; ICAO: AGGK

Summary
- Airport type: Public
- Location: Kirakira, Makira Island, Solomon Islands
- Elevation AMSL: 8 ft (2.4 m)
- Coordinates: 10°26′58″S 161°53′54″E
- Interactive map of Kirakira Airport

Kirakira Airport (IATA: IRA, ICAO: AGGK) is an airport located at Kirakira on the island of Makira (formerly San Cristobal), part of the Makira-Ulawa Province in the Solomon Islands. It is also known as Ngorangora Airstrip and was constructed in the late 1950s. The airport has scheduled flights provided by Solomon Airlines, using De Havilland Canada Dash 8 aircraft.

== Airlines and destinations ==
Solomon Airlines connects Kirakira Airport to Honiara International Airport.
