= Ulawa Airport =

Airport in Arona, Ulawa Island, Solomon Islands

- IATA: RNA; ICAO: AGAR

Summary
- Location: Arona, Ulawa Island
- Coordinates: 09°51′38″S 161°58′47″E
- Interactive map of Ulawa Airport

Runways
Direction	Length		Surface
Direction	ft	m	Surface
06/24	2,952	900

Ulawa Airport is an airport in Arona on Ulawa Island in the Solomon Islands (IATA: RNA, ICAO: AGAR).

== Airlines and destinations ==
Solomon Airlines connects Ulawa Airport to Honiara International Airport.
