= Avuavu Airstrip =

Airstrip in Guadalcanal Province, Solomon Islands

- IATA: AVU; ICAO: AGGJ

Summary
- Airport type: Public
- Location: Avuavu, Guadalcanal Province, Solomon Islands
- Coordinates: 9.86795°S 160.41044°E
- Interactive map of Avuavu Airstrip

Avuavu Airstrip (also known as Avu Avu Airstrip or Avu'Avu Airstrip) is an airstrip in Avu Avu, Guadalcanal Province, Solomon Islands. It has the IATA code AVU and the ICAO code AGGJ. The airstrip is currently closed and undergoing rehabilitation for a planned reopening to domestic flights, with efforts supported by the Solomon Islands Government, Guadalcanal Province, and local communities.

== History ==
Construction of Avuavu Airstrip began in the mid-1960s following a survey of the site in 1964. The airstrip was constructed by the local council and surrounding communities and was completed in 1965. It officially opened on 4 March 1966, becoming the ninth airfield established in the British Solomon Islands Protectorate and the first to be constructed by a local council. The airstrip was established to provide air access to the remote Weather Coast region of Guadalcanal, and was used for passenger services, medical evacuations, and the transport of supplies.

The airstrip was historically served by Megapode Airways, which extended scheduled flights to Avuavu in 1966, and later by Solomon Islands Airways (SOLAIR) as part of its domestic network during the early 1970s.

Following the decline of air services to the area, Avuavu Airstrip became inactive. In the 2020s, efforts began to rehabilitate the airstrip and restore domestic air services to the region, with support from the Solomon Islands Government, Guadalcanal Province, and local communities.

== Facilities ==
Avuavu Airstrip has one grass runway, numbered 14/32, measuring 750 metres (2,461 ft) in length and 30 metres (98 ft) in width. The airstrip is situated at an elevation of 25 feet (8 m) above mean sea level.
