= Lomlom Airport =

Airport in Lomlom, Reef Islands, Solomon Islands

- IATA: LLM; ICAO: AGLM

Summary
- Location: Lomlom, Reef Islands
- Coordinates: 10°17′52″S 166°19′41″E
- Interactive map of Lomlom Airport

Lomlom Airport is an airport serving Lomlom, in the Reef Islands, in the Solomon Islands (IATA: LLM, ICAO: AGLM). The airport opened in 2018.

== Airlines and destinations ==
Solomon Airlines connects Lomlom Airport to Honiara International Airport.
