= Santa Ana Airport (Solomon Islands) =

- IATA: NNB; ICAO: AGGT

Summary
- Location: Santa Ana Island, Solomon Islands
- Coordinates: 10°50′53″S 162°27′15″E
- Interactive map of Santa Ana Airport

Santa Ana Airport (IATA: NNB, ICAO: AGGT) is an airport on Santa Ana, an island in the Makira-Ulawa Province in the Solomon Islands. The airport has scheduled flights provided by Solomon Airlines, using DHC-6 Twin Otter aircraft.

== Airlines and destinations ==
Solomon Airlines connects Santa Ana Airport to Honiara International Airport.
