= Ulawa Island =

Island in Solomon Islands

Coordinates: 9°46′S 161°57′E

Ulawa
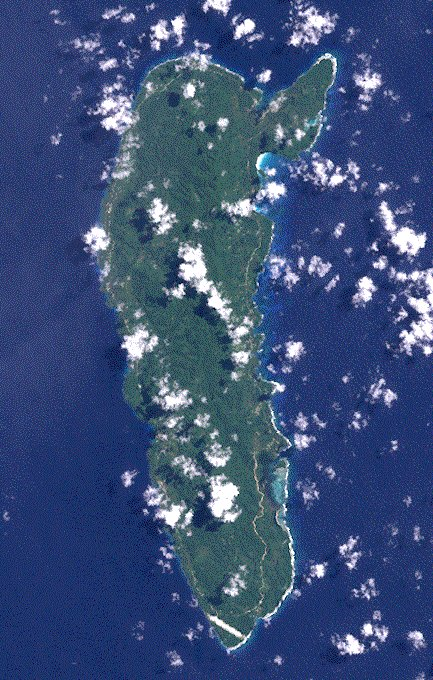

Geography
- Location: South Pacific Ocean
- Archipelago: Solomon Islands (archipelago)
- Area: 65.92 km^{2} (25.45 sq mi)
- Highest elevation: 181 m (594 ft)

Administration
- Solomon Islands
- Province: Makira-Ulawa Province

Demographics
- Population: 3,297 (2009)

Ulawa Island is an island in Solomon Islands. It is located near Malaita Island and belongs to Makira-Ulawa Province. The island has an area of 65.92 square kilometres (25 square miles).

A hilly island, its highest point is 181 metres (594 feet) above sea level. Average temperatures are around 27 °C year-round, and the island receives an annual average rainfall of some 2,800 mm (110.24 inches).

A dialect of the Saʼa language is spoken on Ulawa Island.

== History ==
First recorded sighting by Europeans was by the Spanish expedition of Álvaro de Mendaña in May 1568. More precisely the sighting and also landing in Ulawa was due to a local voyage done by a small boat, in the accounts the brigantine Santiago, commanded by Alférez Hernando Enríquez and having Hernán Gallego as pilot. They charted it as La Treguada and reported that the name given to it by the natives was Uraba.

== Transportation ==
The island is served by Ulawa Airport, with flights on Solomon Airlines. Its major port is in the Su'u Moli Harbour, with passenger and cargo boats making trips to the island once every week.
