= Uru Harbour Airport =

Airport in Solomon Islands

- IATA: ATD; ICAO: AGAT

Summary
- Airport type: Private
- Elevation AMSL: 24 ft (7.3 m)
- Coordinates: 08°52′24″S 161°00′41″E

Map
- Location in the Solomon Islands

Runways
Direction	Length		Surface
Direction	m	ft	Surface
06/24	737	2,418	Grass

Uru Harbour Airport (IATA: ATD, ICAO: AGAT), or Atoifi Airport, is a private airport located in Atoifi, Malaita, Solomon Islands.

== Airline and destination ==
Solomon Airlines connects Uru Harbour Airport to Honiara International Airport and Manaoba Airport.
