= Seghe, Solomon Islands =

Town in the Solomon Islands

Coordinates: 8°34′33″S 157°52′35″E

Seghe is a town on the island of New Georgia, Solomon Islands.

== Transportation ==
The town is served by Seghe Airport, with flights on Solomon Airlines.
