= Marau Airport =

- IATA: RUS; ICAO: AGGU

Summary
- Operator: Solomon Airlines
- Serves: Marau Sound, Guadalcanal Island
- Location: Marau, Solomon Islands
- Coordinates: 9°51′42″S 160°49′30″E
- Interactive map of Marau Airport

Runways
Direction	Length		Surface
Direction	ft	m	Surface
	2,000	610

Marau Airport is an airport on Marau Sound Island in the Solomon Islands. It is served by Solomon Airlines services to Honiara (IATA: RUS, ICAO: AGGU).
