= Kaghau Airport =

- IATA: KGE; ICAO: AGKG

Summary
- Location: Kaghau, Solomon Islands
- Coordinates: 7°19′58″S 157°35′13″E
- Interactive map of Kaghau Airport

Kaghau Airport is an airport on Kaghau Island in the Solomon Islands (IATA: KGE, ICAO: AGKG). Sometimes, it can be called Kagau Airport, or Kagau Island Airport.

== Airlines and destinations ==
Solomon Airlines connects Kaghau Airport to Honiara International Airport and Suavanao Airport.
