= Nggatokae Island =

Island in Solomon Islands

Coordinates: 8°46′S 158°11′E

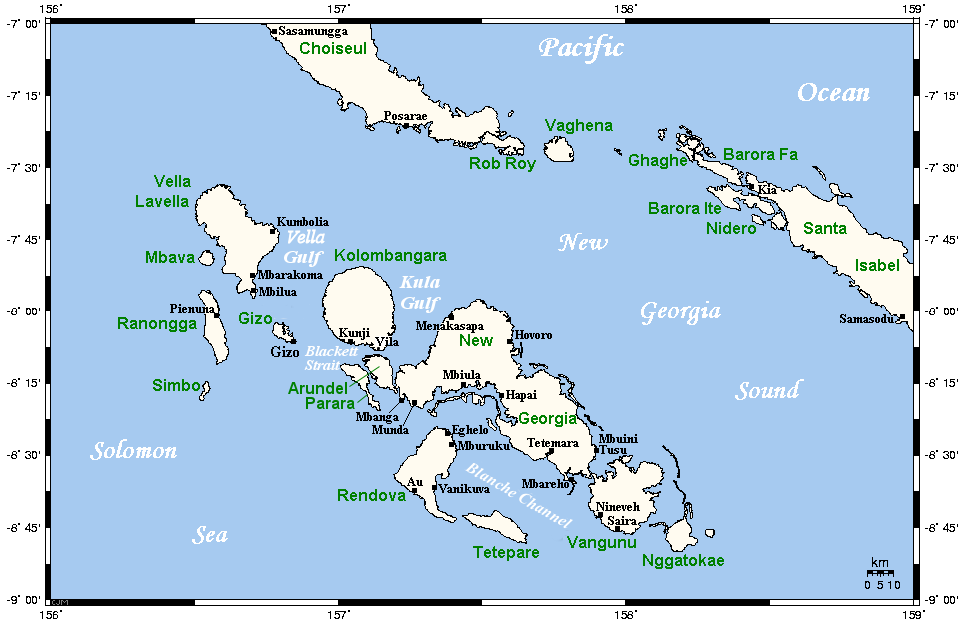
New Georgia Islands

Nggatokae Island is an island in the New Georgia Islands within Western Province, Solomon Islands. It is served by Gatokae Aerodrome.

The island is an extinct volcano, the highest peak is Mount Mariu (887 metres (2,910 ft)).

The island has an area of 93 square kilometres (36 sq mi), and a population of 2,367 (1999 census).

== Gallery ==
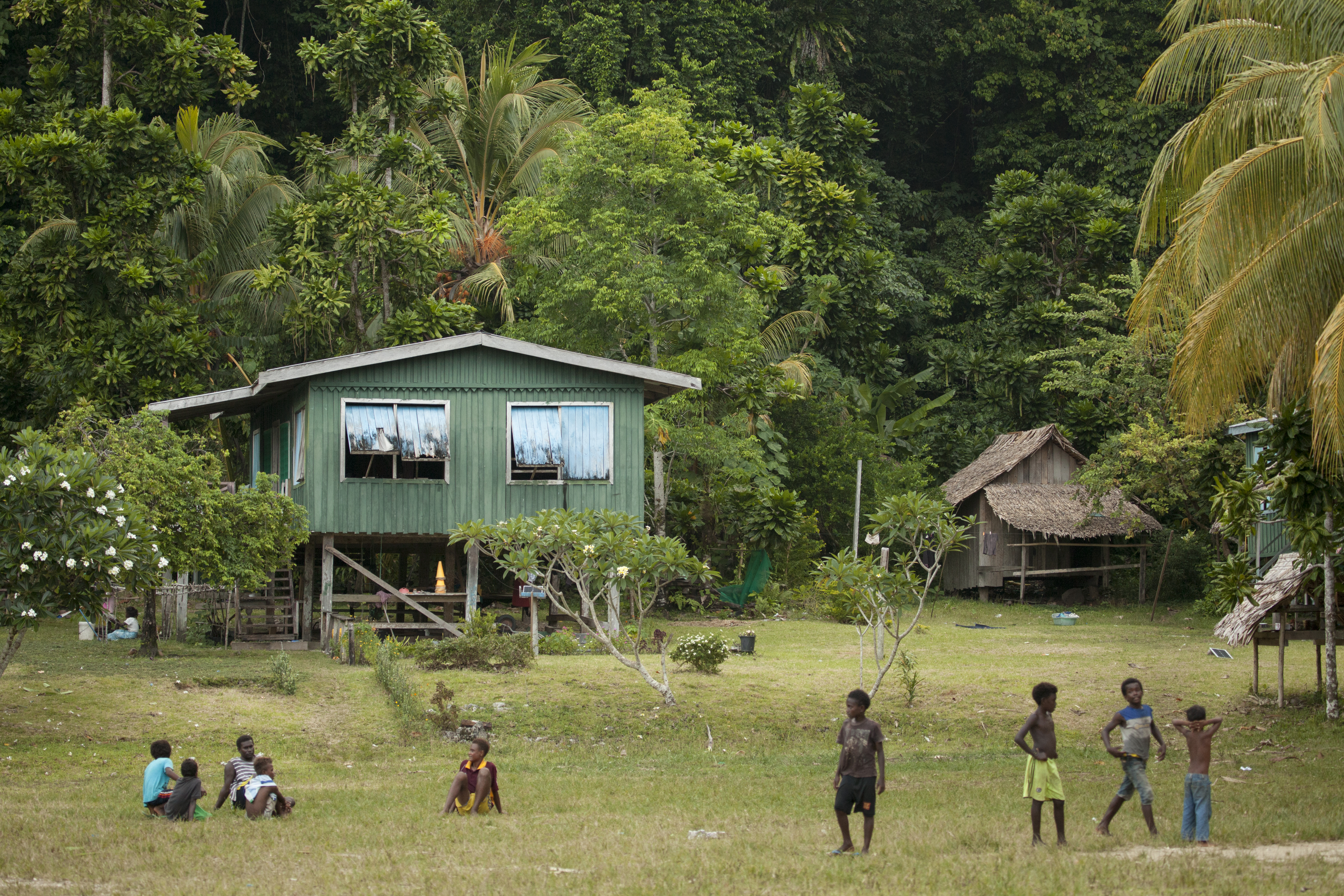
People interact on a large open field outside the schoolhouse. This field is used for many different activities and acts as a recreational area for villagers

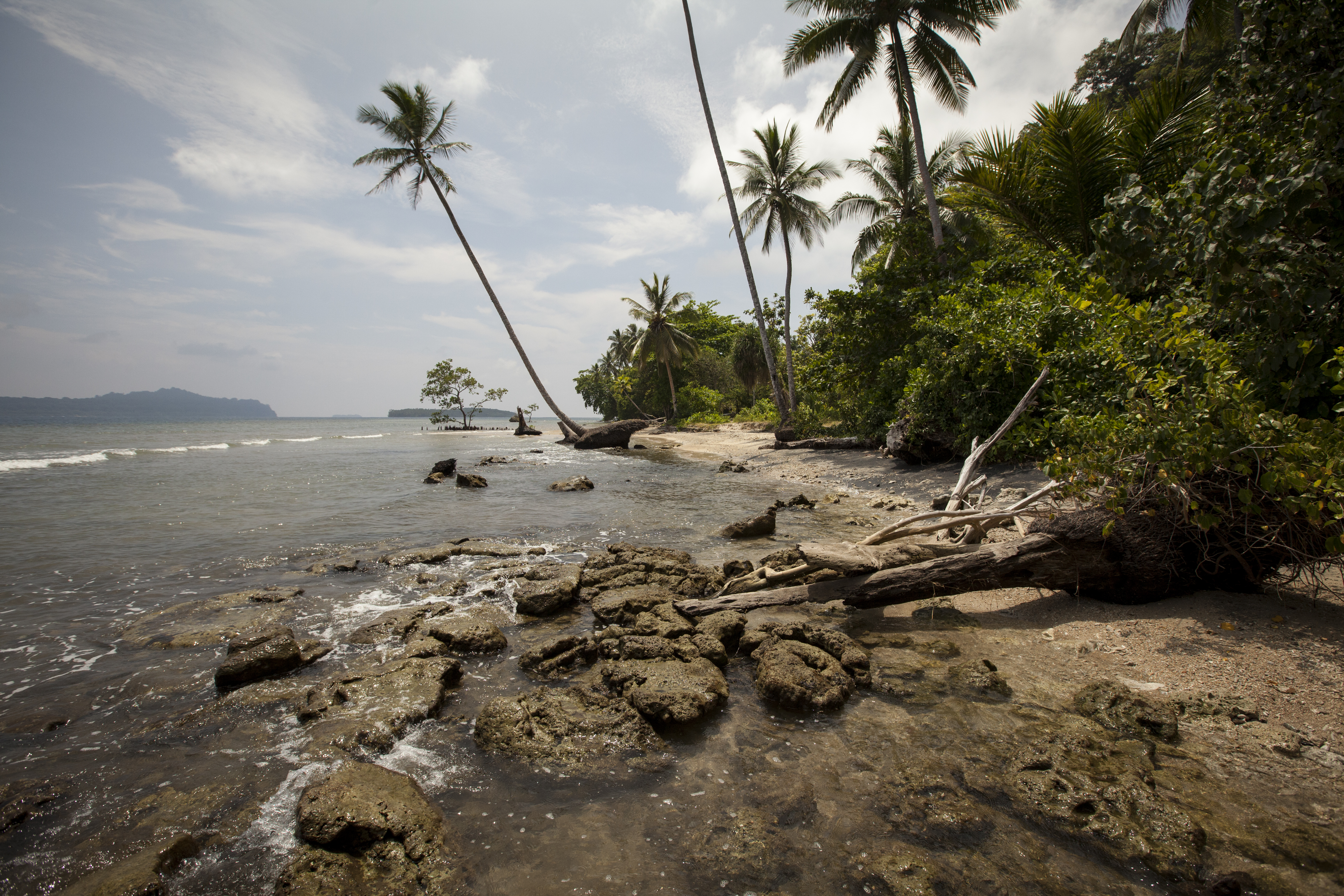
This image represents a dramatic and present visual of coastal erosion happening on the island of Nggatokae in the Western Province of the Solomon Islands.

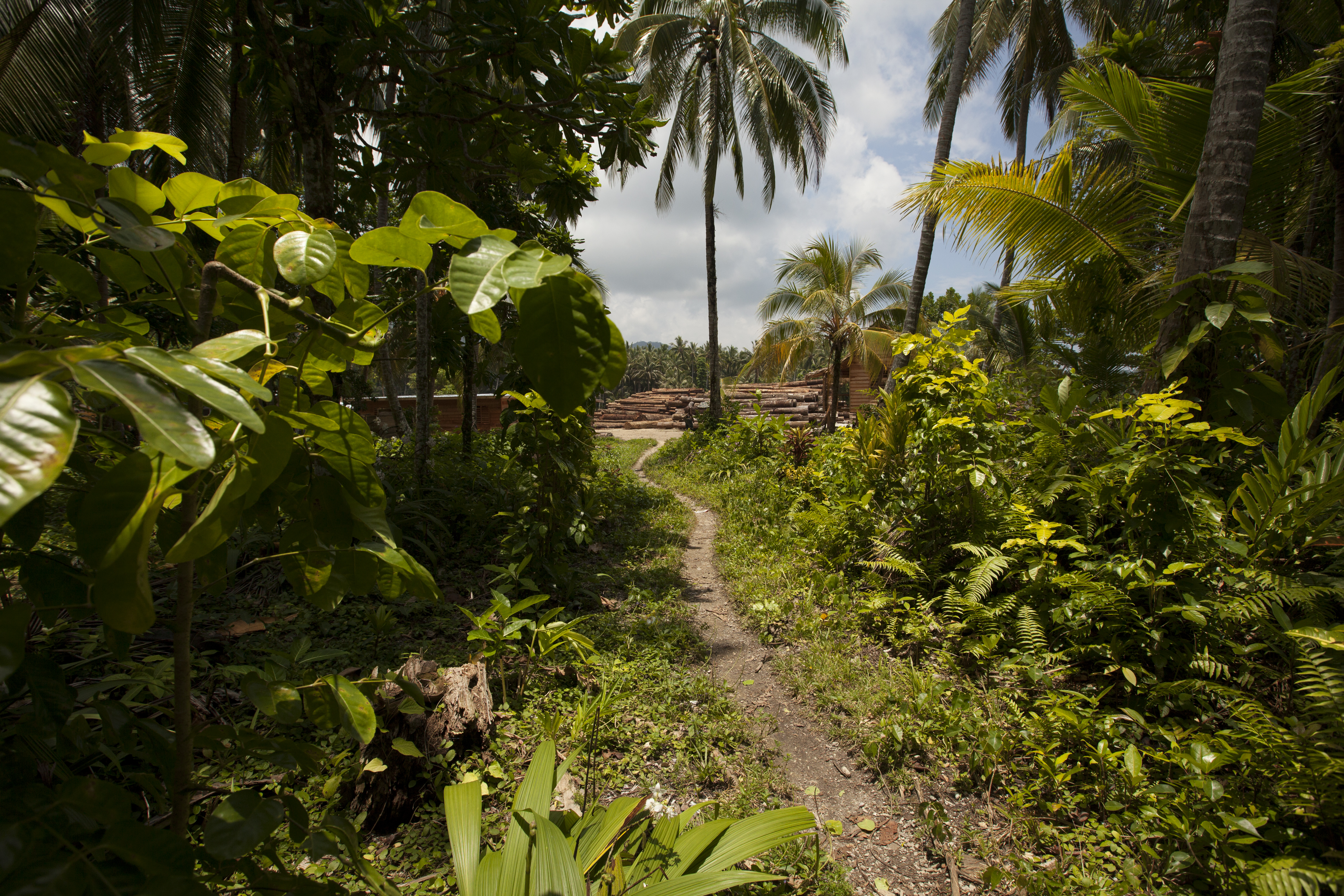
This path leads to a logging camp that is harvesting old growth forest on the island of Nggatokae in the Western Province of the Solomon Islands.

== See also ==
- Western Province topics
- Penjuku, a coastal village
