= Afutara Airport =

- IATA: AFT; ICAO: AGAF

Summary
- Serves: Afutara
- Location: Malaita Province, Solomon Islands
- Coordinates: 09°11′28″S 160°56′57″E

Map
- Location of the airport in Solomon Islands

Runways
| Direction | Length | | Surface |
| Direction | ft | m | Surface |
|---|---|---|---|
| (07/25) | 1,536 | 468 | grass |
- Source: Great Circle Mapper

Afutara Airport is an airport near the village of Afutara on Malaita in the Solomon Islands (IATA: AFT, ICAO: AGAF). It is 37.89 miles from Auki airport. Commercial flights are currently suspended by Solomon Airlines.
