= Mono Airport =

Airport in Mono Island, Solomon Islands

- IATA: MNY; ICAO: AGGO

Summary
- Location: Mono Island
- Coordinates: 7°24′58″S 155°33′55″E
- Interactive map of Mono Airport

Mono Airport is an airport on Stirling Island in the Solomon Islands (IATA: MNY, ICAO: AGGO).

== Airlines and destinations ==
Solomon Airlines connects Mono Airport to Nusatupe Airport (Gizo) and Munda Airport.

== History ==
Following the Allied invasion of the Northern Solomon Islands on October 25–27, 1943, an airstrip was built on Stirling Island by the 87th Naval Construction Battalion. Stirling Airfield was then used to support a campaign to neutralize Japanese air power at Rabaul.

Stirling Airfield, January 1944

Also known as "Coronus Strip", the airfield was used by:

- 42d Bombardment Group, 20 January–August 1944
- 347th Fighter Group, 15 January-15 August 1944
- Special Task Air Group STAG-1 (TDR)
- VMB-413 operating PBJs
- VMD-254 operating PB4Ys

Stirling Airfield is still in use today by the Solomons Airlines.

== See also ==
- USAAF in the South Pacific
