= Gatokae Aerodrome =

- IATA: GTA; ICAO: AGOK

Summary
- Location: Gatokae, Solomon Islands
- Coordinates: 8°44′21″S 158°12′11″E

Map
- Location within Solomon Islands

Gatokae Aerodrome is an airport on Nggatokae Island, Solomon Islands (IATA: GTA, ICAO: AGOK).
