= Ramata Airport =

- IATA: RBV; ICAO: AGRM

Summary
- Location: Ramata Island, Solomon Islands
- Coordinates: 8°10′05″S 157°38′33″E
- Interactive map of Ramata Airport

Ramata Airport is an airport on Ramata Island in Solomon Islands (IATA: RBV, ICAO: AGRM).

Solomon Airlines serves the airport weekly. Flights from Honiara to Ramata take 1 hour and 20 minutes.

== Airlines and destinations ==
Solomon Airlines connects Ramata Airport to Munda Airport.
