= Ramata Island =

Island in Solomon Islands

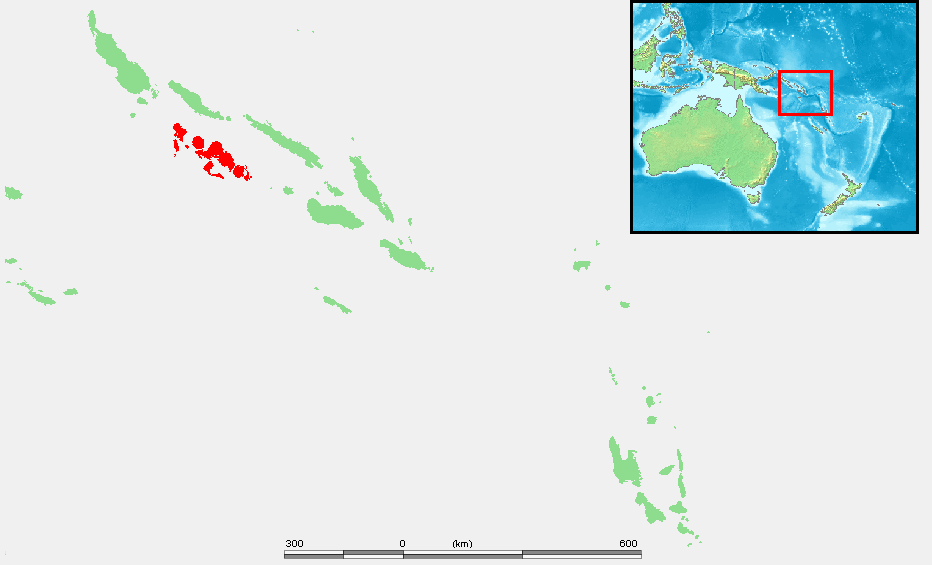

Geography
- Coordinates: 8.1745°S 157.65337°E
- Archipelago: Solomon Islands

Administration
- Solomon Islands

Ramata Island is a small island about 4 kilometres (2.5 mi) long and less than 500 metres (1,600 ft) wide lying just off the New Georgia in Solomon Islands.

The island is served by weekly flights to and from Ramata Airport. The island is part of the chain that separates the north Marovo Lagoon, the longest island fringed lagoon in the world, from the Solomon Sea. A sports fishing lodge run by Solomon Islanders caters to tourists.
