= Marau Sound =

Island in Solomon Islands

Coordinates: 09°48′16″S 160°50′36″E

Marau Sound is a sound in Solomon Islands; it is located at the eastern end of Guadalcanal Island, in Guadalcanal Province.

In 1896 a large and profitable trading station was established on Tavanipupu (Crawford) Island in Marau Sound. It is now the site of the Tavanipupu Resort, which was visited by the Duke and Duchess of Cambridge in 2012.
