= Bellona Island =

Island in Solomon Islands

Bellona
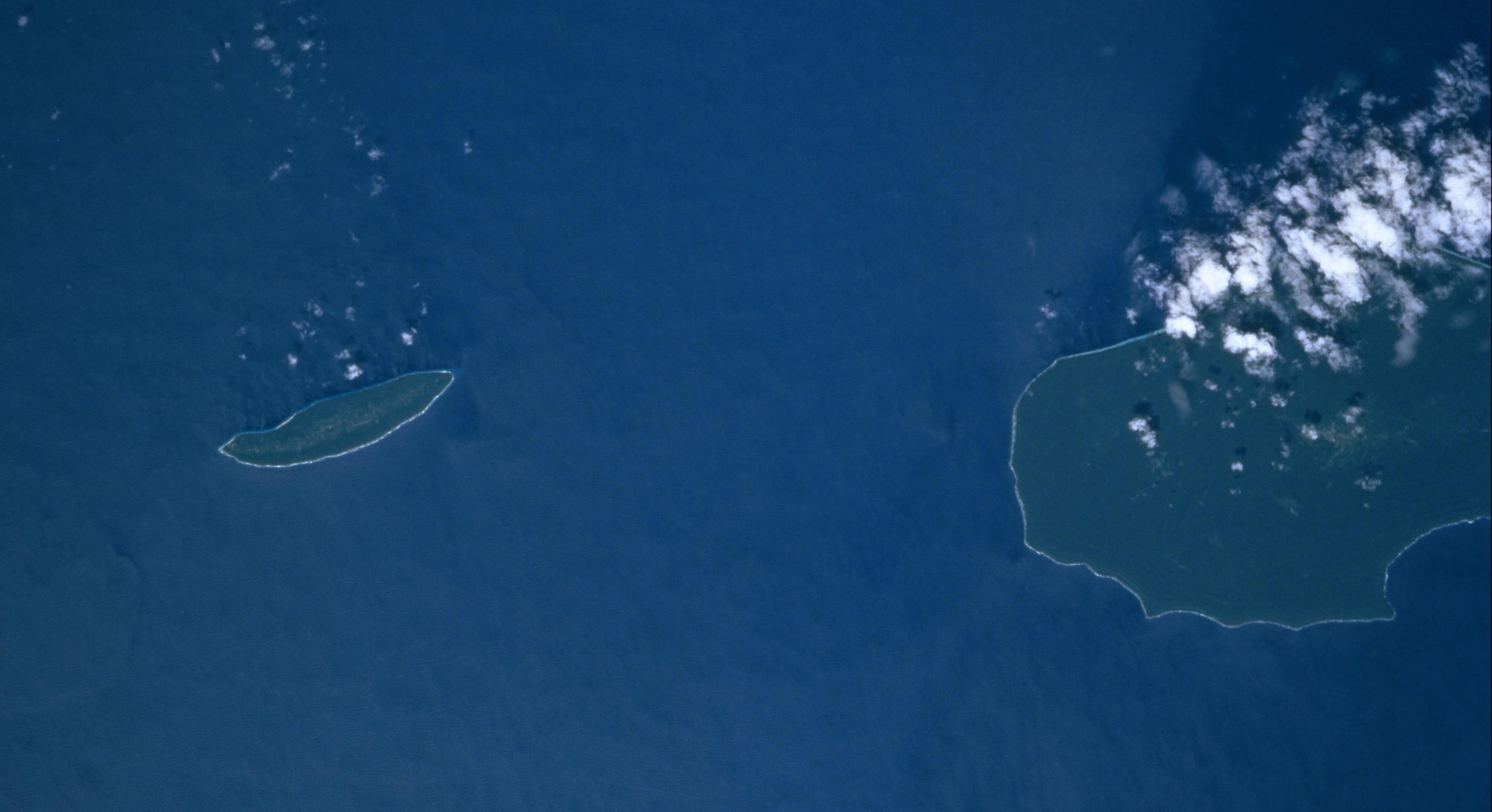
- Bellona is the small island on the left side; the northern end of Rennell Island can be seen on the right of the picture.

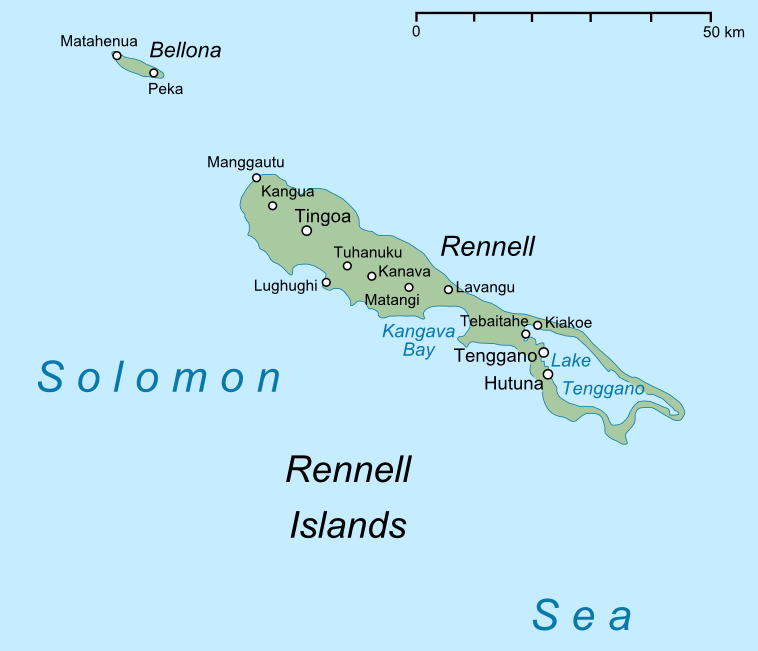
- Bellona Island is to the north of Rennell Island

- Location of Bellona Island in Solomon Islands

Geography
- Location: Pacific Ocean
- Coordinates: 11.30°S 159.80°E
- Archipelago: Solomon Islands
- Area: 17 km^{2} (6.6 sq mi)
- Length: 10 km (6 mi)
- Width: 2.5 km (1.55 mi)

Administration
- Solomon Islands
- Province: Rennell and Bellona

Bellona Island (indigenous name Mungiki) is an island within Rennell and Bellona Province, in Solomon Islands. Its length is about 10 km (6.2 mi) and its average width 2.5 km (1.6 mi). Its area is about 17 km^{2} (6.6 sq mi). It is almost entirely surrounded by 30–70 m (100–230 ft) high cliffs, consisting primarily of raised coral limestone.

== Population ==
Bellona Island is one of the Polynesian islands of the Solomon Islands archipelago, located over 100km South of the island of Guadalcanal. There are three districts namely Matangi (East), Ghongau (Central) and Sa'aiho (West). The island has seven original tribes in the center of the island namely: Nuku'Angoha, Ngikobaka, Baitanga, Tongaba, Sa'apai, Hangekumi, and Ghongau, with two subregions namely Ngutuanga Bangitakungu and Ngutuanga Bangika'ango. There are over ten traditional villages on Bellona Island namely:

- Matahenua/Matamoana (west)
- Honga'ubea
- Tongomainge
- Saukapoi
- Matabaingei
- Ngotokanaba
- Pauta
- Nuku'Angoha (Nuku clinic)
- Ngongona
- Ghongau
- Ahenoa
- Matangi
- NukuTonga (East)
- Tehakapaia
- Pangangiu
- Peka

Bellona Island is the sister island of Rennell Island. It is a Polynesian-inhabited outlier island of the Solomons, a predominantly Melanesian country with two ethnic minority groups of Polynesian and Micronesian communities. It is thus counted among the Polynesian outliers. The nearby Bellona Shoals were the site of several shipwrecks. On the western end of the island there were sacred stone-gods, at a place called Ngabenga- west Bellona. The stone-gods were destroyed by Seventh-day Adventist missionaries in 1938. This island was named in 1792 after Capt. Mathew Boyd's ship The Bellona. However, its original name is Mungiki.

== See also ==
- Polynesian outliers
- British Solomon Islands

== Literature ==
- Subsistence on Bellona Island (Mungiki): A Study of the Cultural Ecology of a Polynesian Outlier in the British Solomon Islands Protectorate by Sofus Christiansen. Publisher: Aarhus University Press, Pub. Date: January 1975, ISBN 978-87-480-0090-2
