= Mbambanakira Airport =

- IATA: MBU; ICAO: AGGD

Summary
- Location: Mbambanakira, Solomon Islands
- Coordinates: 9°44′51″S 159°50′20″E
- Interactive map of Mbambanakira Airport

Mbambanakira Airport is an airport on Mbambanakira in the Solomon Islands (IATA: MBU, ICAO: AGGD).
