= Choiseul Bay =

Bay in the Solomon Islands

Choiseul Bay is a bay in the northwestern part of Choiseul Island, Solomon Islands, at 6.7°S 156.4333333°E.

== See also ==
- Raid on Choiseul
