= Nusatupe =

Island in Solomon Islands

Nusatupe is an island in Western Province, Solomon Islands, about 2 km east of Ghizo Island. Nusatupe is a populated Island, including Nusatupe Airport personnel, people operating island tourist facilities, and WorldFish Headquarters staff.

== Airport ==
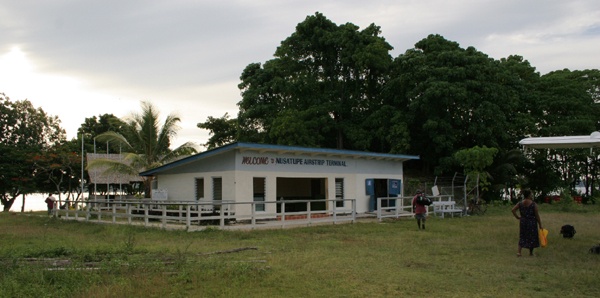
Musatupe airport, servicing nearby Ghizo Island

Nusatupe Airport (IATA: GZO, ICAO: AGGN) is a regular Solomon Airlines destination. It was constructed during World War II to support USAAF operations by flattening two islands and joining them together using the spoil. It was subsequently redeveloped in 2013 under a New Zealand aid programme, removing an abrupt level change midway to provide a level strip, though the terminal is yet to be upgraded. A boat shuttle service ferries passengers to Gizo. Private boats are able to load from the jetty. In January 2023 it was rated as the "best airstrip in the South Pacific" by the Coral Sea Foundation.
