= Honiara International Airport =

International airport in Honiara, Guadalcanal, Solomon Islands

Honiara International Airport (formerly Henderson Field)
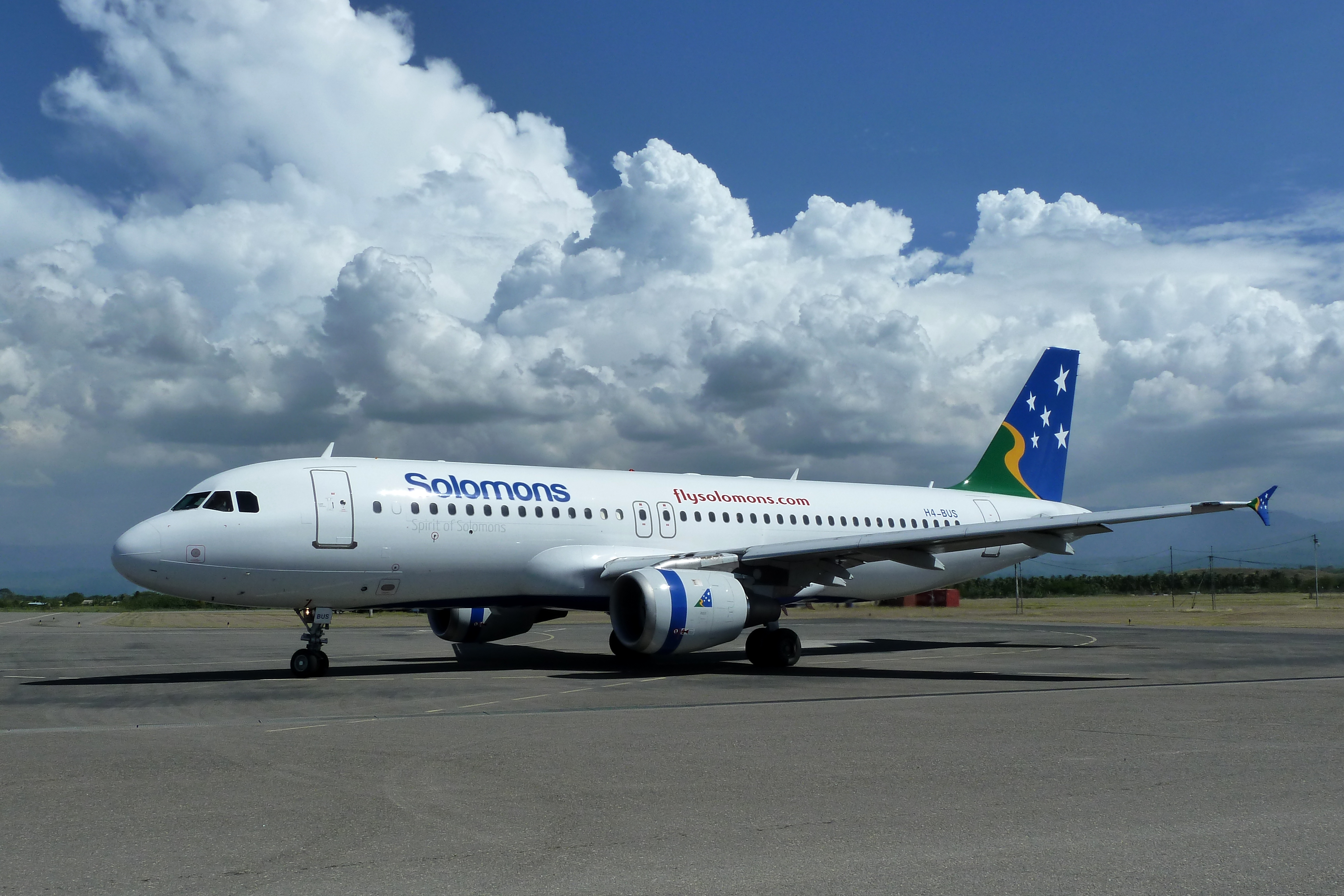
- Solomon Airlines Airbus A320-211 at Honiara Airport in 2012
- IATA: HIR; ICAO: AGGH

Summary
- Airport type: Civilian
- Location: Guadalcanal
- Elevation AMSL: 28 ft (8.5 m)
- Coordinates: 09°25′41″S 160°03′17″E
- Website: flysolomons.com/plan/honiara-airport

Map
- Location of the airport in Solomon Islands HIR (Oceania)

Runways
Direction	Length		Surface
Direction	ft	m	Surface
06/24	7,218	2,200	Asphalt
- Source: WAD

Honiara International Airport (IATA: HIR, ICAO: AGGH), formerly known as Henderson Field, is an airport in the province of Guadalcanal in the nation of Solomon Islands. It is the primary international airport in the country, the second being Munda Airport in Western Province, which serves as its alternate. It is located 8 kilometres (5 miles) from the capital, Honiara.

== History ==
A magnitude 7.0 earthquake struck 57 kilometres (35 mi) southwest of Honiara on 22 November 2022. The ceiling of the terminal was damaged but the structure remained intact. The affected areas were closed for repairs.

== Airlines and destinations ==
=== Passenger ===
Airlines	Destinations
Air Niugini	Port Moresby, Port Vila
QantasLink	Brisbane
Solomon Airlines	Port Moresby

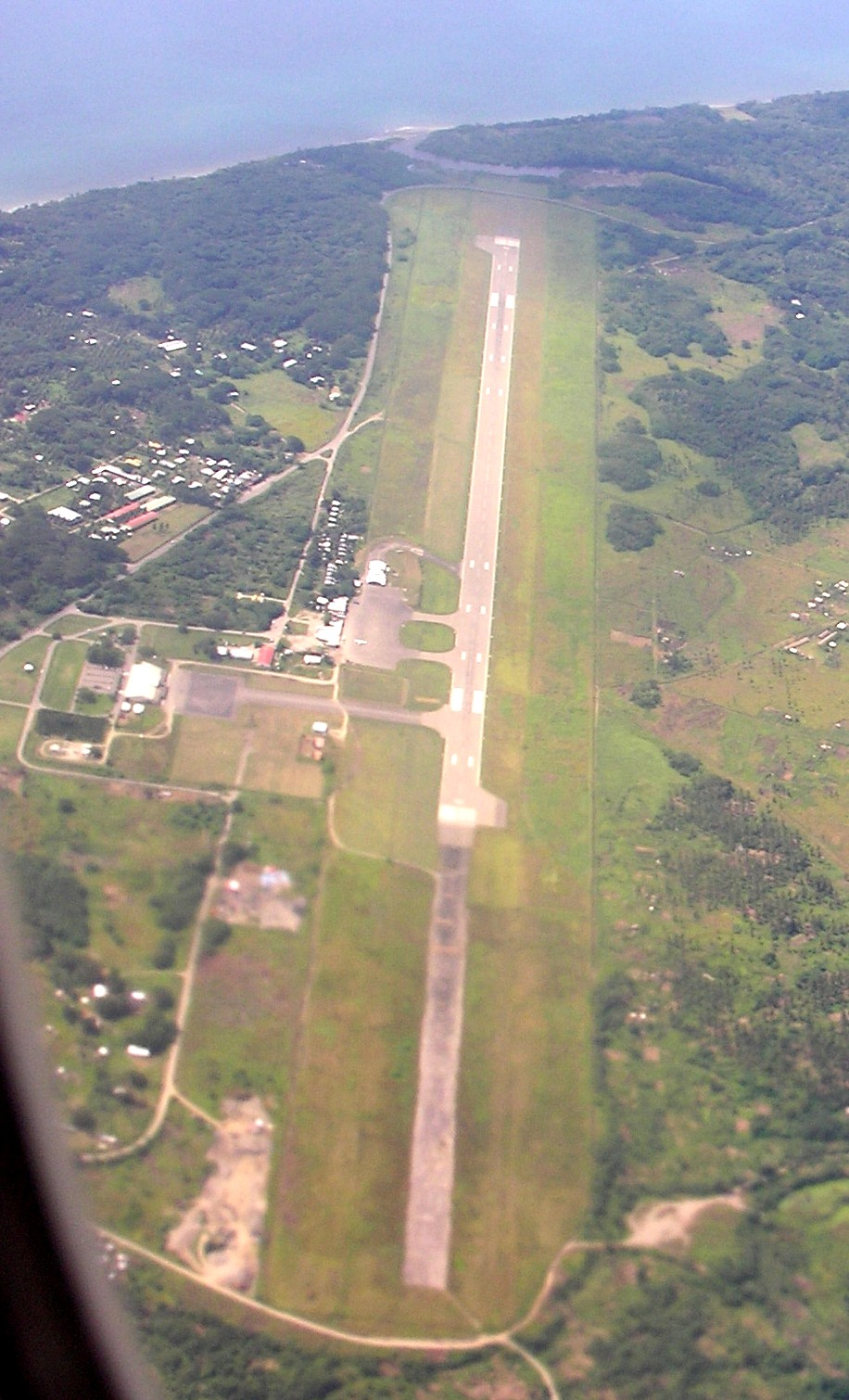
Aerial view of Honiara International Airport looking to east
