= List of airports by IATA code: U =

IATA	ICAO	Airport name	Location served
-UA-
UAB	LTAG	Incirlik Air Base	Adana, Turkey
UAC		San Luis Río Colorado Airport	San Luis Río Colorado, Sonora, Mexico
UAE		Mount Aue Airport	Mount Aue, Papua New Guinea
UAH	NTMU	Ua Huka Airport	Ua Huka, Marquesas Islands, French Polynesia
UAI	WPDB	Suai Airport	Suai, Timor-Leste
UAK	BGBW	Narsarsuaq Airport	Narsarsuaq, Greenland
UAL	FNUA	Luau Airport	Luau, Angola
UAM	PGUA	Andersen Air Force Base	Hagåtña (Agana), Guam
UAP	NTMP	Ua Pou Airport	Ua Pou, Marquesas Islands, French Polynesia
UAQ	SANU	Domingo Faustino Sarmiento Airport	San Juan, San Juan, Argentina
UAR	GMFB	Bouarfa Airport	Bouarfa, Morocco
UAS	HKSB	Samburu Airport (Buffalo Spring Airport)	Samburu, Kenya
UAX		Uaxactun Airport	Uaxactun, Guatemala
-UB-
UBA	SBUR	Mário de Almeida Franco Airport	Uberaba, Minas Gerais, Brazil
UBB	YMAA	Mabuiag Island Airport	Mabuiag Island, Queensland, Australia
UBI		Buin Airport	Buin, Papua New Guinea
UBJ	RJDC	Yamaguchi Ube Airport	Ube, Honshu, Japan
UBN	ZMCK	Chinggis Khaan International Airport	Sergelen, Töv, Mongolia
UBP	VTUU	Ubon Ratchathani Airport	Ubon Ratchathani, Thailand
UBR	WAJU	Ubrub Airport	Ubrub, Indonesia
UBS	KUBS	Columbus-Lowndes County Airport	Columbus, Mississippi, United States
UBT	SDUB	Ubatuba Airport (Gastão Madeira Airport)	Ubatuba, São Paulo, Brazil
UBU	YKAL	Kalumburu Airport	Kalumburu, Western Australia, Australia
-UC-
UCB		Ulanqab Airport	Ulanqab, Inner Mongolia, China
UCC	KUCC	Yucca Airstrip (FAA: NV11)	Mercury, Nevada, United States
UCE		Eunice Airport (FAA: 4R7)	Eunice, Louisiana, United States
UCK	UKLC	Lutsk Airport	Lutsk, Ukraine
UCN	GLBU	Buchanan Airport	Buchanan, Liberia
UCT	UUYH	Ukhta Airport	Ukhta, Komi Republic, Russia
UCY	KUCY	Everett–Stewart Regional Airport	Union City, Tennessee, United States
-UD-
UDA	YUDA	Undara Airport	Undara, Queensland, Australia
UDD	KUDD	Bermuda Dunes Airport	Palm Springs, California, United States
UDE	EHVK	Volkel Air Base	Uden, Netherlands
UDI	SBUL	Ten. Cel. Av. César Bombonato Airport	Uberlândia, Minas Gerais, Brazil
UDJ	UKLU	Uzhhorod International Airport	Uzhhorod, Ukraine
UDN	LIPD	Campoformido Airport	Udine, Friuli-Venezia Giulia, Italy
UDR	VAUD	Maharana Pratap Airport	Udaipur, Rajasthan, India
-UE-
UEE	YQNS	Queenstown Airport	Queenstown, Tasmania, Australia
UEL	FQQL	Quelimane Airport	Quelimane, Mozambique
UEN	USDU	Urengoy Airport	Urengoy, Yamalo-Nenets Autonomous Okrug, Russia
UEO	ROKJ	Kumejima Airport	Kumejima, Okinawa Islands, Japan
UES	KUES	Waukesha County Airport (Crites Field)	Waukesha, Wisconsin, United States
UET	OPQT	Quetta International Airport	Quetta, Pakistan
-UF-
UFA	UWUU	Ufa International Airport	Ufa, Bashkortostan, Russia
-UG-
UGA	ZMBN	Bulgan Airport	Bulgan, Mongolia
UGB		Ugashik Bay Airport	Pilot Point, Alaska, United States
UGC	UTNU	Urgench International Airport	Urgench, Uzbekistan
UGI		San Juan (Uganik) Seaplane Base (FAA: WSJ)	Uganik, Alaska, United States
UGL	SCGC	Union Glacier Blue-Ice Runway	Heritage Range, Ellsworth Mountains, Antarctica
UGN	KUGN	Waukegan National Airport	Waukegan, Illinois, United States
UGO	FNUG	Uíge Airport	Uíge, Angola
UGS		Ugashik Airport (FAA: 9A8)	Ugashik, Alaska, United States
UGT	ZMBR	Bulagtai Airport	Bulagtai, Mongolia
UGU		Bilogai Airport	Bilogai, Indonesia
-UH-
UHE	LKKU	Kunovice Airport	Uherské Hradiště, Czech Republic
-UI-
UIB	SKUI	El Caraño Airport	Quibdó, Colombia
UIH	VVPC	Phu Cat Airport	Qui Nhơn, Vietnam
UII	MHUT	Útila Airport	Útila, Honduras
UIK	UIBS	Ust-Ilimsk Airport	Ust-Ilimsk, Irkutsk Oblast, Russia
UIL	KUIL	Quillayute Airport	Forks, Washington, United States
UIN	KUIN	Quincy Regional Airport (Baldwin Field)	Quincy, Illinois, United States
UIO	SEQM	Mariscal Sucre International Airport	Quito, Ecuador
UIP	LFRQ	Quimper–Cornouaille Airport (Pluguffan)	Quimper, Brittany, France
UIQ	NVVQ	Quoin Hill Airfield	Quoin Hill, Vanuatu
UIR	YQDI	Quirindi Airport	Quirindi, New South Wales, Australia
UIT		Jaluit Airport (FAA: N55)	Jaluit Atoll, Marshall Islands
-UJ-
UJE		Ujae Airport	Ujae Atoll, Marshall Islands
UJN	RKTL	Uljin Airport	Uljin, South Korea
UJU	ZKUJ	Uiju Airfield	Uiju, North Korea
-UK-
UKA	HKUK	Ukunda Airport (Diani Airport)	Ukunda, Kenya
UKB	RJBE	Kobe Airport	Kobe / Osaka, Honshu, Japan
UKE	VEUK	Utkela Airport	Bhawanipatna, Kalahandi district, Odisha, India
UKG	UEBT	Ust-Kuyga Airport	Ust-Kuyga, Yakutia, Russia
UKH	OOMK	Mukhaizna Airport	Mukhaizna, Oman
UKI	KUKI	Ukiah Municipal Airport	Ukiah, California, United States
UKK	UASK	Oskemen Airport (Ust-Kamenogorsk Airport)	Oskemen (Ust-Kamenogorsk), Kazakhstan
UKN		Waukon Municipal Airport (FAA: Y01)	Waukon, Iowa, United States
UKR	OYMK	Mukeiras Airport	Mukayras, Yemen
UKS	UKFB	Sevastopol International Airport	Sevastopol
UKT	KUKT	Quakertown Airport	Quakertown, Pennsylvania, United States
UKU		Nuku Airport	Nuku, Papua New Guinea
UKX	UITT	Ust-Kut Airport	Ust-Kut, Irkutsk Oblast, Russia
-UL-
ULA	SAWJ	Capitán José Daniel Vazquez Airport	Puerto San Julián, Santa Cruz, Argentina
ULB	NVSU	Ulei Airport	Ulei, Vanuatu
ULD	FAUL	Ulundi Airport	Ulundi, South Africa
ULE		Sule Airport	Sule, Papua New Guinea
ULG	ZMUL	Ölgii Airport	Ölgii, Mongolia
ULH	OEAO	Prince Abdul Majeed bin Abdulaziz Domestic Airport	Al-'Ula, Saudi Arabia
ULI		Ulithi Airport (FAA: TT02)	Ulithi, Federated States of Micronesia
ULK	UERL	Lensk Airport	Lensk, Yakutia, Russia
ULL		Glenforsa Airfield	Mull, Scotland, United Kingdom
ULM	KULM	New Ulm Municipal Airport	New Ulm, Minnesota, United States
ULN	ZMUB	Buyant-Ukhaa International Airport	Ulaanbaatar, Mongolia
ULO	ZMUG	Ulaangom Airport	Ulaangom, Mongolia
ULP	YQLP	Quilpie Airport	Quilpie, Queensland, Australia
ULQ	SKUL	Heriberto Gíl Martínez Airport	Tuluá, Colombia
ULS		Mulatos Airport	Mulatos, Colombia
ULU	HUGU	Gulu Airport	Gulu, Uganda
ULV	UWLL	Ulyanovsk Baratayevka Airport	Ulyanovsk, Ulyanovsk Oblast, Russia
ULX		Ulusaba Airstrip	Ulusaba, South Africa
ULY	UWLW	Ulyanovsk Vostochny Airport	Ulyanovsk, Ulyanovsk Oblast, Russia
ULZ	ZMDN	Donoi Airport	Uliastai, Mongolia
-UM-
UMA		Punta de Maisí Airport	Maisí, Cuba
UMC		Umba Airport	Umba, Papua New Guinea
UME	ESNU	Umeå Airport	Umeå, Sweden
UMI	SPIL	Quince Mil Airport	Quince Mil, Peru
UMM	PAST	Summit Airport	Summit, Alaska, United States
UMR	YPWR	RAAF Woomera Airfield	Woomera, South Australia, Australia
UMS	UEMU	Ust-Maya Airport	Ust-Maya, Yakutia, Russia
UMT	PAUM	Umiat Airport	Umiat, Alaska, United States
UMU	SSUM	Orlando de Carvalho Airport	Umuarama, Paraná, Brazil
UMY	UKHS	Sumy Airport	Sumy, Ukraine
UMZ	KMEZ	Mena Intermountain Municipal Airport	Mena, Arkansas, United States
-UN-
UNA	SBTC	Una-Comandatuba Airport	Una / Comandatuba Island, Bahia, Brazil
UNC		Unguía Airport	Unguía, Colombia
UND	OAUZ	Kunduz Airport	Kunduz, Afghanistan
UNE	FXQN	Qacha's Nek Airport	Qacha's Nek, Lesotho
UNG	AYKI	Kiunga Airport	Kiunga, Papua New Guinea
UNI	TVSU	Union Island Airport	Union Island, Saint Vincent and the Grenadines
UNK	PAUN	Unalakleet Airport	Unalakleet, Alaska, United States
UNN	VTSR	Ranong Airport	Ranong, Thailand
UNR	ZMUH	Öndörkhaan Airport	Öndörkhaan, Mongolia
UNT		Unst Airport	Unst, Scotland, United Kingdom
UNU	KUNU	Dodge County Airport	Juneau, Wisconsin, United States
-UO-
UOA	NTTX	Mururoa Airport	Moruroa (Mururoa), Tuamotus, French Polynesia
UOL	WAMY	Pogogul Airport	Buol, Indonesia
UOS	KUOS	Franklin County Airport	Sewanee, Tennessee, United States
UOX	KUOX	University-Oxford Airport	Oxford, Mississippi, United States
-UP-
UPB	MUPB	Playa Baracoa Airport	Havana, Cuba
UPG	WAAA	Sultan Hasanuddin International Airport	Makassar, Indonesia
UPL	MRUP	Upala Airport	Upala, Costa Rica
UPN	MMPN	Ignacio López Rayón International Airport	Uruapan, Michoacán, Mexico
UPP	PHUP	Upolu Airport	Hawi, Hawaii, United States
UPR		Upiara Airport	Upiara, Papua New Guinea
UPV	EGDJ	RAF Upavon	Upavon, England, United Kingdom
-UR-
URA	UARR	Oral Ak Zhol Airport	Oral (Uralsk), Kazakhstan
URB		Castilho Airport (Urubupunga Airport)	Castilho, São Paulo, Brazil
URC	ZWWW	Ürümqi Diwopu International Airport	Ürümqi, Xinjiang, China
URD	EDQE	Burg Feuerstein Airport	Burg Feuerstein, Bavaria, Germany
URE	EEKE	Kuressaare Airport	Kuressaare, Estonia
URG	SBUG	Rubem Berta International Airport	Uruguaiana, Rio Grande do Sul, Brazil
URI	SKUB	Uribe Airport	La Uribe, Colombia
URJ	USHU	Uray Airport	Uray, Khanty-Mansi Autonomous Okrug, Russia
URM	SVUM	Uriman Airport	Uriman, Venezuela
URN	OAOG	Urgun Airport	Urgun, Afghanistan
URO	LFOP	Rouen Airport (Vallée de Seine Airport)	Rouen, Upper Normandy, France
URR	SKUR	Urrao Airport	Urrao, Colombia
URS	UUOK	Kursk Vostochny Airport	Kursk, Kursk Oblast, Russia
URT	VTSB	Surat Thani Airport	Surat Thani, Thailand
URU		Uroubi Airport	Uroubi, Papua New Guinea
URY	OEGT	Gurayat Domestic Airport	Qurayyat (Gurayat), Saudi Arabia
URZ	OARG	Uruzgan Airport	Khas Uruzgan, Afghanistan
-US-
USA	KJQF	Concord Regional Airport (FAA: JQF)	Concord, North Carolina, United States
USC		Union County Airport/Troy Shelton Field (FAA: 35A)	Union, South Carolina, United States
USH	SAWH	Ushuaia – Malvinas Argentinas International Airport	Ushuaia, Tierra del Fuego, Argentina
USI	SYMB	Mabaruma Airport	Mabaruma, Guyana
USJ	UAAL	Usharal Airport	Usharal, Kazakhstan
USK	UUYS	Usinsk Airport	Usinsk, Komi Republic, Russia
USL	YUSL	Useless Loop Airport	Useless Loop, Western Australia, Australia
USM	VTSM	Samui Airport	Ko Samui, Thailand
USN	RKPU	Ulsan Airport	Ulsan, South Korea
USO		Usino Airport	Usino, Papua New Guinea
USQ	LTBO	Uşak Airport	Uşak, Turkey
USR	UEMT	Ust-Nera Airport	Ust-Nera, Yakutia, Russia
USS	MUSS	Sancti Spíritus Airport	Sancti Spíritus, Cuba
UST	KSGJ	Northeast Florida Regional Airport (FAA: SGJ)	St. Augustine, Florida, United States
USU	RPVV	Francisco B. Reyes Airport	Busuanga, Philippines
-UT-
UTA	FVMU	Mutare Airport	Mutare, Zimbabwe
UTB	YMTB	Muttaburra Airport	Muttaburra, Queensland, Australia
UTC	EHSB	Soesterberg Air Base	Utrecht, Netherlands
UTD		Nutwood Downs Airport	Nutwood Downs, Northern Territory, Australia
UTG	FXQG	Quthing Airport	Quthing, Lesotho
UTH	VTUD	Udon Thani International Airport	Udon Thani, Thailand
UTI	EFUT	Utti Airport	Utti, Finland
UTK		Utirik Airport (FAA: 03N)	Utirik Atoll, Marshall Islands
UTM	KUTA	Tunica Municipal Airport (FAA: UTA)	Tunica, Mississippi, United States
UTN	FAUP	Upington Airport	Upington, South Africa
UTO	PAIM	Indian Mountain LRRS Airport	Utopia Creek, Alaska, United States
UTP	VTBU	U-Tapao International Airport	Rayong, Thailand
UTS	UUYX	Ust-Tsilma Airport	Ust-Tsilma, Komi Republic, Russia
UTT	FAUT	Mthatha Airport	Mthatha (Umtata), South Africa
UTU		Ustupo Airport	Ustupo, Panama
UTW	FAQT	Queenstown Airport	Queenstown, South Africa
-UU-
UUA	UWKB	Bugulma Airport	Bugulma, Tatarstan, Russia
UUD	UIUU	Baikal International Airport	Ulan-Ude, Buryatia, Russia
UUK	PAKU	Ugnu-Kuparuk Airport (FAA: UBW)	Kuparuk, Alaska, United States
UUN	ZMBU	Baruun-Urt Airport	Baruun-Urt, Mongolia
UUS	UHSS	Yuzhno-Sakhalinsk Airport (Khomutovo Airport)	Yuzhno-Sakhalinsk, Sakhalin Oblast, Russia
UUU		Manumu Airport	Manumu, Papua New Guinea
-UV-
UVA	KUVA	Garner Field	Uvalde, Texas, United States
UVE	NWWV	Ouvéa Airport (Ouloup Airport)	Ouvéa, New Caledonia
UVF	TLPL	Hewanorra International Airport	Vieux Fort, Saint Lucia
UVI	SSUV	União da Vitória Airport	União da Vitória, Paraná, Brazil
UVL	HEKG	El Kharga Airport	Kharga Oasis, Egypt
UVO		Uvol Airport	Uvol, Papua New Guinea
-UY-
UYL	HSNN	Nyala Airport	Nyala, Sudan
UYN	ZLYL	Yulin Yuyang Airport	Yulin, Shaanxi, China
UYU	SLUY	Uyuni Airport (Joya Andina Airport)	Uyuni, Bolivia
-UZ-
UZC	LYUZ	Užice-Ponikve Airport	Užice, Serbia
UZM		Hope Bay Aerodrome (TC: CHB3)	Hope Bay, Nunavut, Canada
UZR		Urzhar Airport	Urzhar (Urdzhar), Kazakhstan
UZU	SATU	Curuzú Cuatiá Airport	Curuzú Cuatiá, Corrientes, Argentina
