= URZ =

URZ may refer to:

- IATA airport code for Uruzgan Airport, in Khas Uruzgan, Afghanistan, from the List of airports by IATA code: U
- URZ AP (Univerzální Ruční Zbraň Automatická Puška), an assault rifle of Czechoslovak origin
- "urz", ISO 639-3 language code of the language of the Uru-Eu-Wau-Wau people

== See also ==
- Brime de Urz, a municipality located in the province of Zamora, Castile and León, Spain
- Quintanilla de Urz, a municipality located in the province of Zamora, Castile and León, Spain
