= VMSB-243 =

Marine Scout Bombing Squadron 243
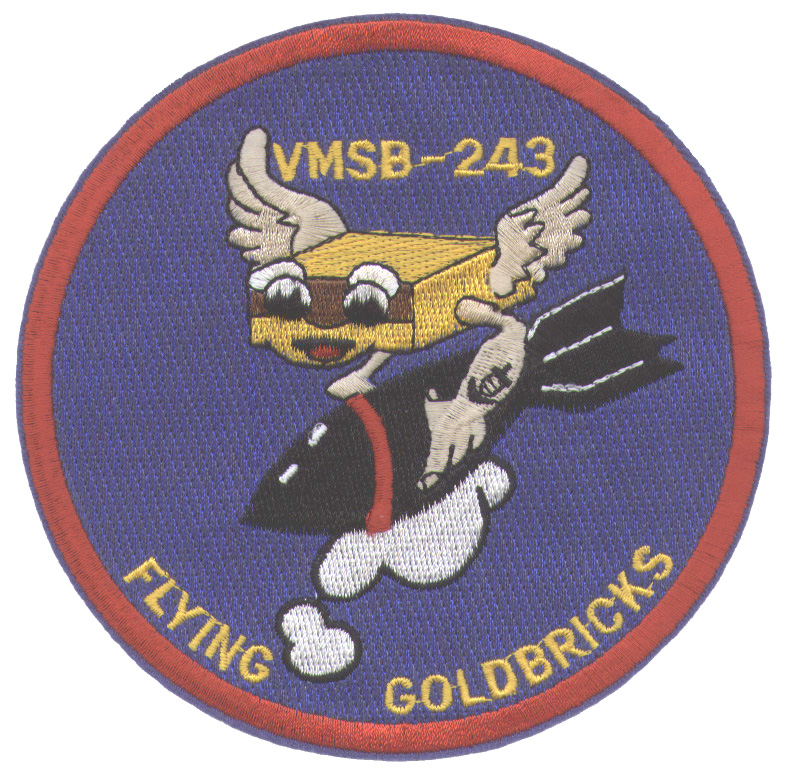
- VMSB-243 Insignia
- Active: 1 June 1942 – 25 September 1945
- Country: United States
- Allegiance: United States of America
- Branch: United States Marine Corps
- Type: Dive Bomber squadron
- Role: Reconnaissance; Air Interdiction; Close air support
- Part of: Inactive
- Nickname: Flying Goldbricks
- Engagements: World War II * Bougainville campaign (1943-45) * Philippines campaign (1944–45)

Aircraft flown
- Bomber: SBD Dauntless

Marine Scout Bombing Squadron 243 (VMSB-243) was a dive bomber squadron in the United States Marine Corps. The squadron, also known as the "Flying Goldbricks", fought in World War II during the Battle of Bougainville and later in the Philippines campaign (1944–45). They were deactivated shortly after the end of the war on 25 September 1945.

== History ==
VMSB-243 was commissioned at Marine Corps Air Station Santa Barbara on 1 June 1942. On 18 January 1943 the squadron departed San Diego for Marine Corps Air Station Ewa, Hawaii. Upon arrival at Ewa they were split into two echelons with one going to Johnston Atoll and the other to Palmyra Atoll. The squadron remained split until September 1943 when they returned to MCAS Ewa.

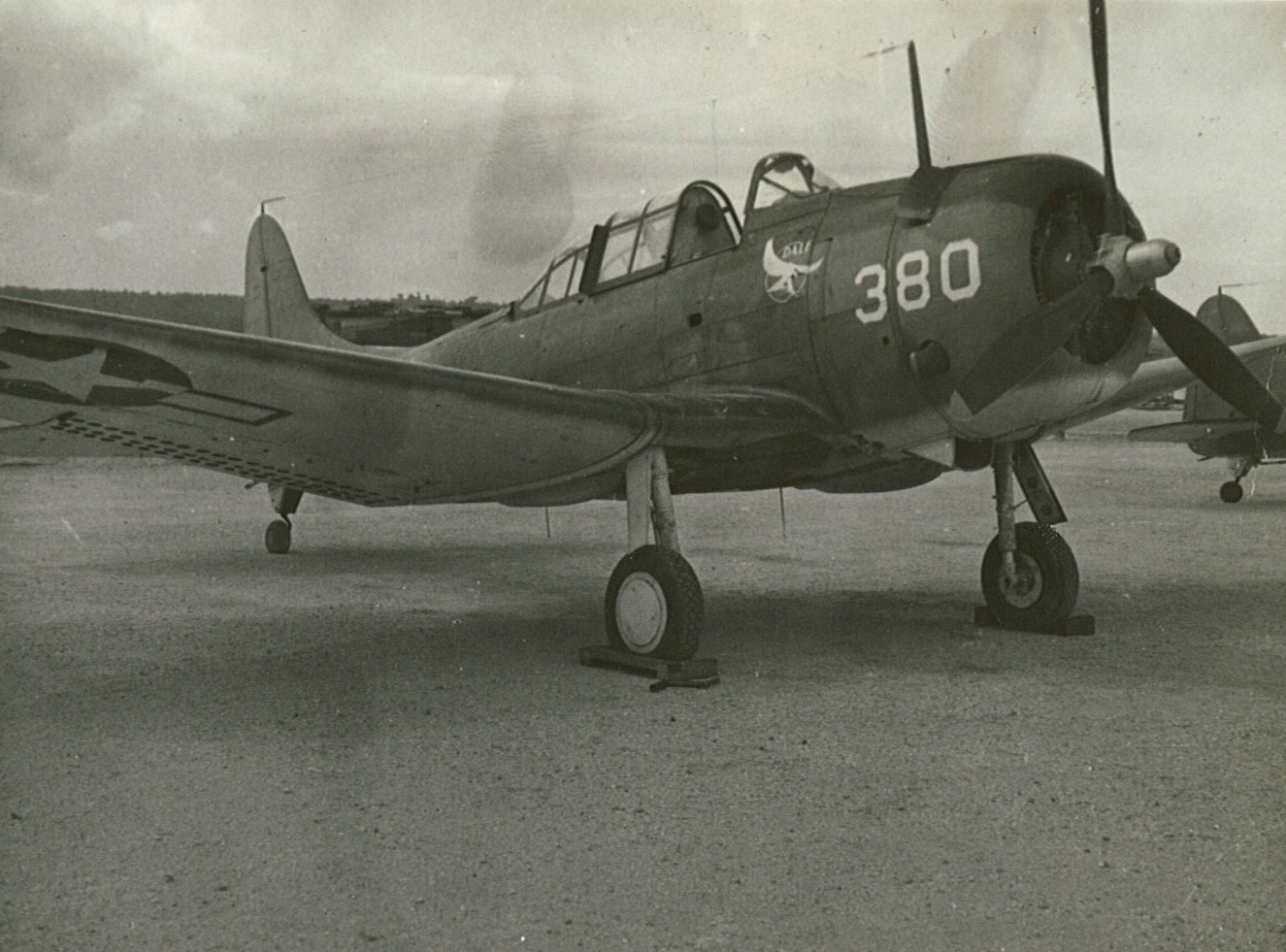
A Douglas SBD-5 Dauntless of VMSB-243.

On 26 October 1943 the squadron departed for the South Pacific, The flying echelon of the squadron was based out of Munda (Solomon Islands) while the ground echelon was based at Efate. From here they attacked Ballale, Kahili and Kara in support of the Bougainville Campaign. In December 1943 the flight echelon joined the ground echelon on Efate where they remained until March 1944.

In June 1944 the squadron moved to Emirau. The squadron remained here until the end of the year when they began moving for the Philippines to take part in the campaign to retake the country. The squadron fought through the entire campaign as part of Marine Aircraft Group 32 and later MAGSZAM.

The squadron ended World War II in the Philippines and deployed back to MCAS Santa Barbara in September 1945 and were decommissioned shortly after that.

== Unit awards ==
A unit citation or commendation is an award bestowed upon an organization for the action cited. Members of the unit who participated in said actions are allowed to wear on their uniforms the awarded unit citation. VMSB-243 has been presented with the following awards:

Ribbon	Unit Award
	Navy Unit Commendation with one Bronze Star
	Asiatic-Pacific Campaign Medal
	World War II Victory Medal
	National Defense Service Medal

== See also ==
- United States Marine Corps Aviation
- List of active United States Marine Corps aircraft squadrons
- List of decommissioned United States Marine Corps aircraft squadrons
