= UBR =

UBR may refer to:

- Unspecified Bit Rate, a traffic contract used to guarantee quality of service for networks
- Universal broadband router, an alternate name for a cable modem termination system
- Uniform Business Rate, see Business rates in England and Wales
- "U.B.R. (Unauthorized Biography of Rakim)", a song by Nas from the album Street's Disciple
- Unmatched Brutality Records
- University Boat Race
- Ubrub Airport, Indonesia (by IATA airport code)
- UDDI Business Registry (UBR), also known as the Public Cloud, is a conceptually single system built from multiple nodes having their data synchronized through replication.
