= UNK =

Unk or UNK may refer to:

- Unk (1982–2025), American DJ and rapper
- unk, the ISO 639-3 code for Enawene Nawe language
- UNK NBA, a clothing brand
- UNK proton accelerator, a particle accelerator near Moscow
- River Unk, Shropshire, river in Shropshire, England
- University of Nebraska at Kearney, often abbreviated UNK
  - Nebraska–Kearney Lopers
- Unalakleet Airport (IATA Code UNK), Alaska

== See also ==
- UNC (disambiguation)
