= Egegik Airport =

Airport in Alaska, United States

- IATA: EGX; ICAO: PAII; FAA LID: EII

Summary
- Airport type: Public
- Owner: City of Egegik
- Serves: Egegik, Alaska
- Elevation AMSL: 92 ft (28 m)
- Coordinates: 58°11′08″N 157°22′32″W

Map
- Location of airport in Alaska EGX (North America)

Runways
Direction	Length		Surface
Direction	ft	m	Surface
12/30	5,600	1,707	Gravel
3/21	1,500	457	Gravel

Statistics
- Based aircraft: 0
- Passengers: 1,304
- Freight: 305,000 lbs
- Source: Federal Aviation Administration; Source: Bureau of Transportation

Egegik Airport (IATA: EGX, ICAO: PAII, FAA LID: EII) is a city-owned, public-use airport serving Egegik, a city in the Lake and Peninsula Borough of the U.S. state of Alaska. Scheduled passenger service is available at this airport.

As per Federal Aviation Administration records, the airport had 1,182 passenger boardings (enplanements) in calendar year 2008, 1,213 enplanements in 2009, and 1,305 in 2010. It is included in the National Plan of Integrated Airport Systems for 2011–2015, which categorized it as a general aviation airport (the commercial service category requires at least 2,500 enplanements per year).

Although most U.S. airports use the same three-letter location identifier for the FAA and IATA, this airport is assigned EII by the FAA and EGX by the IATA. The airport's ICAO identifier is PAII.

== Facilities and aircraft ==
Egegik Airport has two runways with gravel surfaces: 12/30 is 5,600 by 100 feet (1,707 x 30 m) and 3/21 is 1,500 by 75 feet (457 x 23 m). There are three aircraft based at this airport, all single-engine.

== Airlines and destinations ==
Airlines	Destinations
Grant Aviation	King Salmon, Pilot Point, Ugashik Bay

=== Statistics ===
Carrier shares: January – December 2016
Carrier	Passengers (arriving and departing)
Grant	1,270(97.01%)
PenAir	40(2.99%)

Top domestic destinations: January – December 2016

== See also ==
- List of airports in Alaska
