= Indian Mountain Air Force Station =

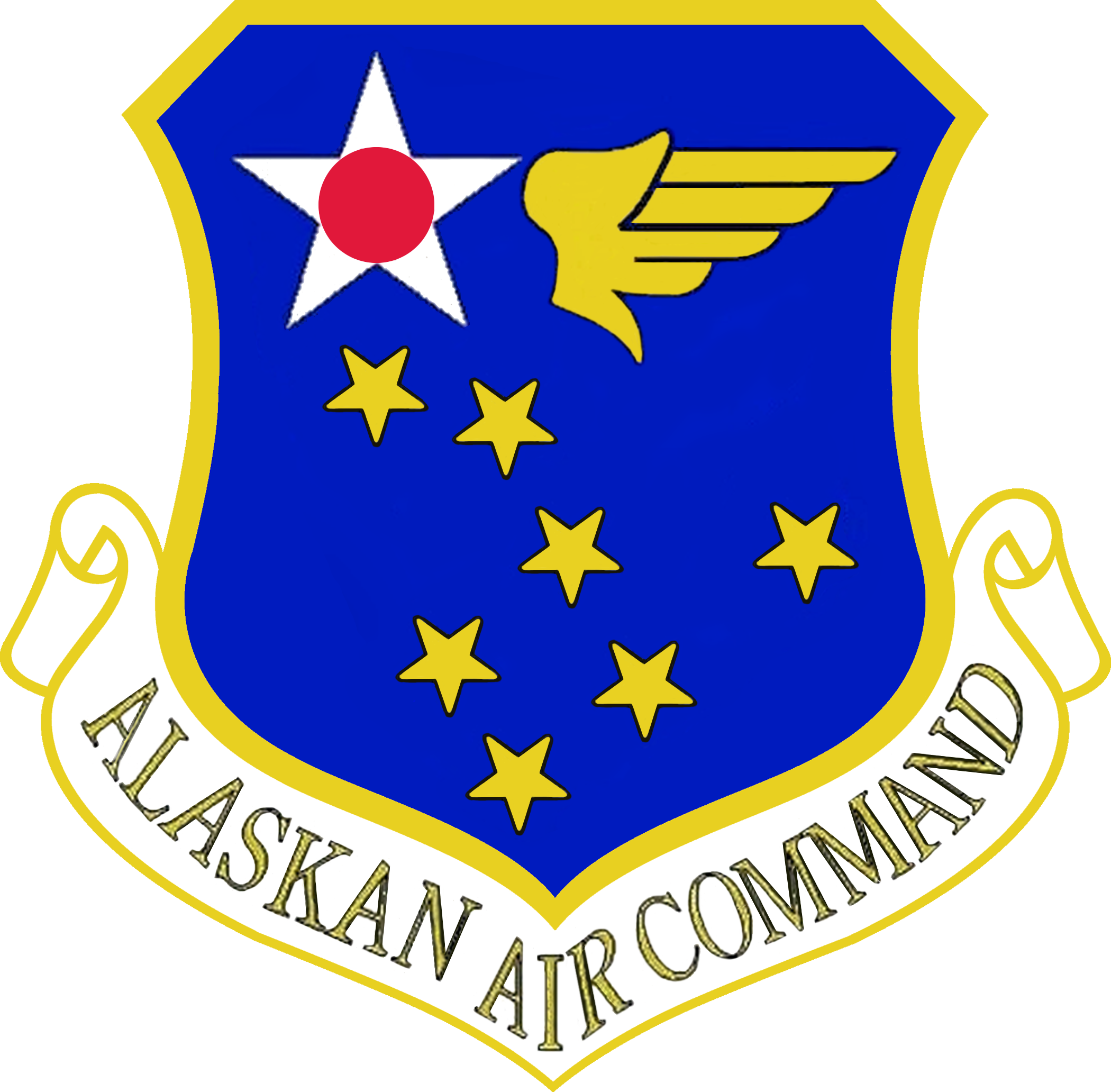
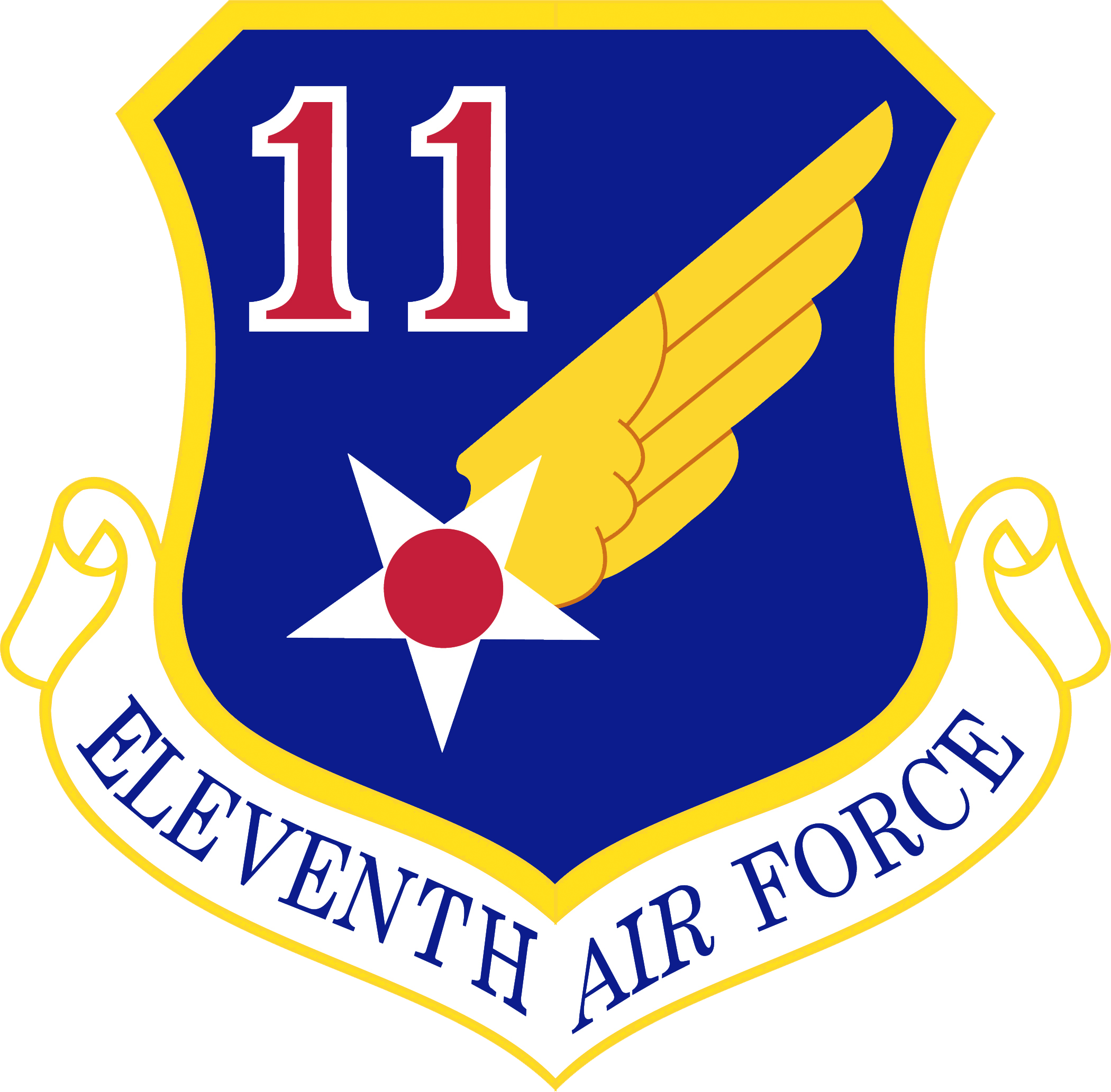
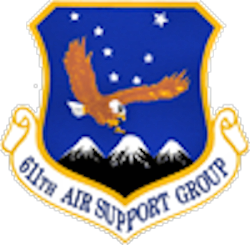
Indian Mountain Long Range Radar Site formerly Indian Mountain Air Force Station
- Part of Eleventh Air Force (PACAF)

Site information
- Type: Air Force Station
- Controlled by: United States Air Force

Location
- Location of Indian Mountain AFS, Alaska
- Coordinates: 66°04′17″N 153°41′04″W

Site history
- Built: 1951
- In use: 1951-Present

Garrison information
- Garrison: 708th Aircraft Control and Warning Squadron (1953–1983)

Indian Mountain Air Force Station (AAC ID: F-16, LRR ID: A-03) is a closed United States Air Force General Surveillance Radar station. It is located 15.8 miles (25.4 km) east of Hughes, Alaska.

The radar surveillance station was closed on 1 November 1983, and was re-designated as a Long Range Radar (LRR) site as part of the Alaska Radar System. Today, it remains active as part of the Alaska NORAD Region under the jurisdiction of the 611th Air and Space Operations Center, Elmendorf AFB, Alaska. It is one of fifteen Long Range Radar Sites within Alaska maintained and operated by ARCTEC, a subsidiary of Arctic Slope Regional Corporation.

== History ==
Indian Mountain AFS was a continental defence radar station constructed to provide the United States Air Force early warning of an attack by the Soviet Union on Alaska. It was one of the 10 original AC&W surveillance stations constructed as part of the establishment of a permanent air defense system in Alaska during the early 1950s.

Construction of the station, began in September 1950 and was completed in November 1953. The Army Corps of Engineers undertook the project. The location of the station made construction a challenge. Military engineer construction personnel built a 9.1 mile road to the top of the mountain where the radars were located (upper camp) and a base station and airstrip (lower camp). The lower camp 65°59′34″N 153°42′15″W, located at the confluence of the Indian River and Utopia Creek, included a runway opened in May 1952 with a 12-percent slope, the steepest remote site runway. The upper camp, at the summit of Indian Mountain (elevation 4,234 feet), could be reached by the road.

The station consisted of a power/heating plant, water and fuel storage tanks, gymnasium and other support office buildings. Two other buildings contained living quarters, work areas, and recreational facilities plus opportunities for such sports as skiing, skating, horseshoes, and basketball. The station buildings were, except for the civil engineering building connected by heated hallways. As a result, personnel stationed there, with only very few exceptions, were able to wear "summer" uniforms year round, unless they had a need to go outside during the winter season. The coverings of the station's three radar towers were heated from within to keep the covering from becoming brittle from extreme cold, and thus subject to being damaged or destroyed by high winds. Tours at the station were limited to one year because of the psychological strain and physical hardships.

The airstrip was adjacent to the station, a 4,100' gravel/dirt airstrip capable for medium transport (C-119, C-123, C-130) aircraft to fly in supplies, equipment, mail and personnel. Mail was usually delivered twice a week. The inaccessibility made the personnel at the site responsible for maintenance if anything went wrong. Water mains occasionally froze and ruptured.

The 708th Aircraft Control and Warning Squadron (AC&W Sq), activated in November 1953, provided information 24/7 to the air defense Direction Center at Murphy Dome AFS near Fairbanks, where it was analyzed to determine range, direction altitude speed and whether or not aircraft were friendly or hostile. Radars operated at the station were an AN/FPS-3, AN/FPS-20, AN/FPS-6, and an AN/PS-6B.

Communications were initially provided by a high frequency radio system which proved unreliable because of atmospheric disturbances. The Alaskan Air Command (AAC), after investigating various options, decided to build the White Alice Communications System, a system of Air Force-owned tropospheric scatter and microwave radio relay sites operated by the Air Force Communications Service (AFCS). The Indian Mountain site 66°04′07″N 153°41′23″W was located near the top camp radars and was activated in 1957. It was inactivated in 1979, and replaced by an Alascom owned and operated satellite earth terminal as part of an Air Force plan to divest itself of the obsolete White Alice Communications System and transfer the responsibility to a commercial firm.(Peymann)

Over the years, the equipment at the station was upgraded or modified to improve the efficiency and accuracy of the information gathered by the radars. In 1983, Indian Mountain AFS received a new AN/FPS-117 minimally attended radar under Alaskan Air Command's SEEK IGLOO program. It was designed to transmit aircraft tracking data via satellite to the Alaskan NORAD Regional Operations Control Center (ROCC) at Elmendorf AFB.

No longer needed, the 708th AC&W Sq was inactivated on l November 1983 and the station re-designated as a Long Range Radar (LRR) Site. In 1990, jurisdiction of the Indian Mountain LRR Site was transferred to Pacific Air Forces' (PACAF)Eleventh Air Force with the redesignation of AAC.

In 1998 PACAF initiated "Operation Clean Sweep", in which abandoned Cold War stations in Alaska were remediated and the land restored to its previous state. After years of neglect the facilities at the station had lost any value they had when the site was closed. The site remediation of the radar, support and White Alice communication station was carried out by the 611th Civil Engineering Squadron at Elmendorf AFB, and remediation work was completed by 2005.

== Current status ==
Today very little of the former Indian Mountain Air Force Station remains. The site is controlled by PACAF's 611th Air and Space Operations Center, based at Elmendorf AFB. The site is generally unattended; a few civilian contractors that access the site by former support airstrip, now the Indian Mountain LRRS Airport (ICAO: PAIM, TC LID: UTO) and provide maintenance and support when needed to maintain the radar system.

- Site is continuously attended by contractors to maintain the runway, power station, roads, buildings, radar and facilities.

== Air Force units and assignments ==
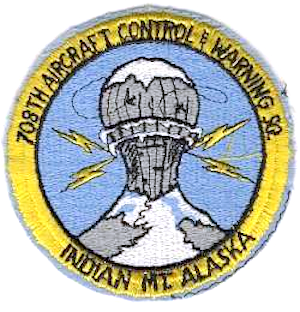
Emblem "A" of the 708th Aircraft Control and Warning Squadron

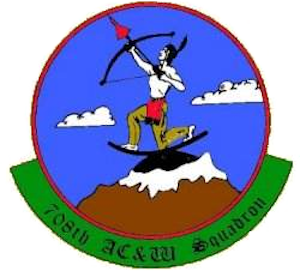
Emblem "B" of the 708th Aircraft Control and Warning Squadron

=== Units ===
- 708th Aircraft Control and Warning Squadron

Activated, 8 December 1952
Inactivated, 1 November 1983

=== Assignments ===
- 160th Aircraft Control and Warning Group, 8 December 1952
- 548th Aircraft Control and Warning Group, 5 February 1953
- 11th Air Division, 18 April 1953
- 5001st Air Defense Group 20 September 1954
- 10th Air Division, 1 October 1955
- 5060th Aircraft Control and Warning Group, 1 November 1957
- 11th Air Division, ca. 1 July 1959
- 5070th Air Defense Wing, 1 August 1960
- Alaskan Air Command, 1 November 1961
- 708th Aircraft Control and Warning Squadron, 1961
- 531st Aircraft Control and Warning Group (later 11th Tactical Control Group, 11th Tactical Control Wing, 11th Air Control Wing, 611th Air Operations Group, 611th Air and Space Operations Center) 15 July 1977
- 807th Engineer Aviation Battalion
- 925th Engineer Aviation Group
