= Kara, Papua New Guinea =

Town on Bougainville Island in Papua New Guinea

Coordinates: 6°42′44″S 155°40′33″E

Kara is a town in southern Bougainville in Papua New Guinea, north of Buin. Buin Airport, formerly known as Kara Airfield, is situated nearby.
