= Ugashik Airport =

Airport in Alaska, United States

- IATA: UGS; ICAO: none; FAA LID: 9A8

Summary
- Airport type: Public
- Owner: State of Alaska DOT&PF - Central Region
- Serves: Ugashik, Alaska
- Elevation AMSL: 25 ft (7.6 m)
- Coordinates: 57°31′24″N 157°23′46″W

Map
- Location of airport in Alaska

Runways
Direction	Length		Surface
Direction	ft	m	Surface
6/24	3,100	945	Gravel

Statistics (2009)
- Aircraft operations: 1,450
- Source: Federal Aviation Administration

Ugashik Airport (IATA: UGS, FAA LID: 9A8) is a state-owned public-use airport located one nautical mile (2 km) north of the central business district of Ugashik, in the Lake and Peninsula Borough of the U.S. state of Alaska. It is included in the National Plan of Integrated Airport Systems for 2011–2015, which categorized it as a general aviation airport.

== Facilities and aircraft ==
Ugashik Airport covers an area of 60 acres (24 ha) at an elevation of 25 feet (8 m) above mean sea level. It has one runway designated 6/24 with a gravel surface measuring 3,100 by 60 feet (945 x 18 m). For the 12-month period ending February 28, 2009, the airport had 1,450 aircraft operations, an average of 120 per month: 52% general aviation and 48% air taxi.

== See also ==
- List of airports in Alaska
- Ugashik Bay Airport (IATA/FAA: UGB) – 57°25′31″N 157°44′24″W
- Pilot Point Airport (FAA: PNP, IATA: PIP, ICAO: PAPN) – 57°34′49″N 157°34′19″W
