= UNC =

UNC is a three-letter abbreviation that may refer to:

== Education ==
- University of North Carolina, a multi-campus public university system in the U.S.
  - University of North Carolina at Chapel Hill, a public research university
  - PBS North Carolina, a public television network serving North Carolina
- University of Northern California, Lorenzo Patiño School of Law, in Sacramento, California, U.S.
- University of Northern Colorado, in Greeley, Colorado, U.S.
- National University of Córdoba (Universidad Nacional de Córdoba), in Argentina
- National University of Cajamarca (Universidad Nacional de Cajamarca), in Peru
- University of New Caledonia, in Nouméa, New Caledonia
- University of Nueva Caceres, in Naga City, Philippines
- Universitas Nicolai Copernici, Latin name of Nicolaus Copernicus University in Toruń, Poland

== Political parties ==
- Cameroonian National Union (Union Nationale Camerounaise), in Cameroon
- Union for the Congolese Nation (Union pour la nation congolaise), in the Democratic Republic of the Congo
- United National Congress, in Trinidad and Tobago
- United National Convention, centrist political party in Ghana during the Third Republic (1979–1981)

== Other uses ==
- Uncirculated grade in notaphily
- United Nations Command, a multinational military force to support South Korea during and after the Korean War
- Unified National Coarse screw thread , a Unified Thread Standard
- Uniform Naming Convention, for Microsoft Windows systems
- United Nuclear Corporation, in the U.S. 1961–1997
- UNC (biology), a set of proteins in C. Elegans
- Unguía Airport, in Colombia (see IATA code: UNC)
- "Unc", a shortened form of uncle, originating in African-American Vernacular English and becoming broadly popular in the 2020s
