= Kahili Airfield =

Former WW2 military airport on Bougainville Island, Papua New Guinea

- Buin, Bougainville Island
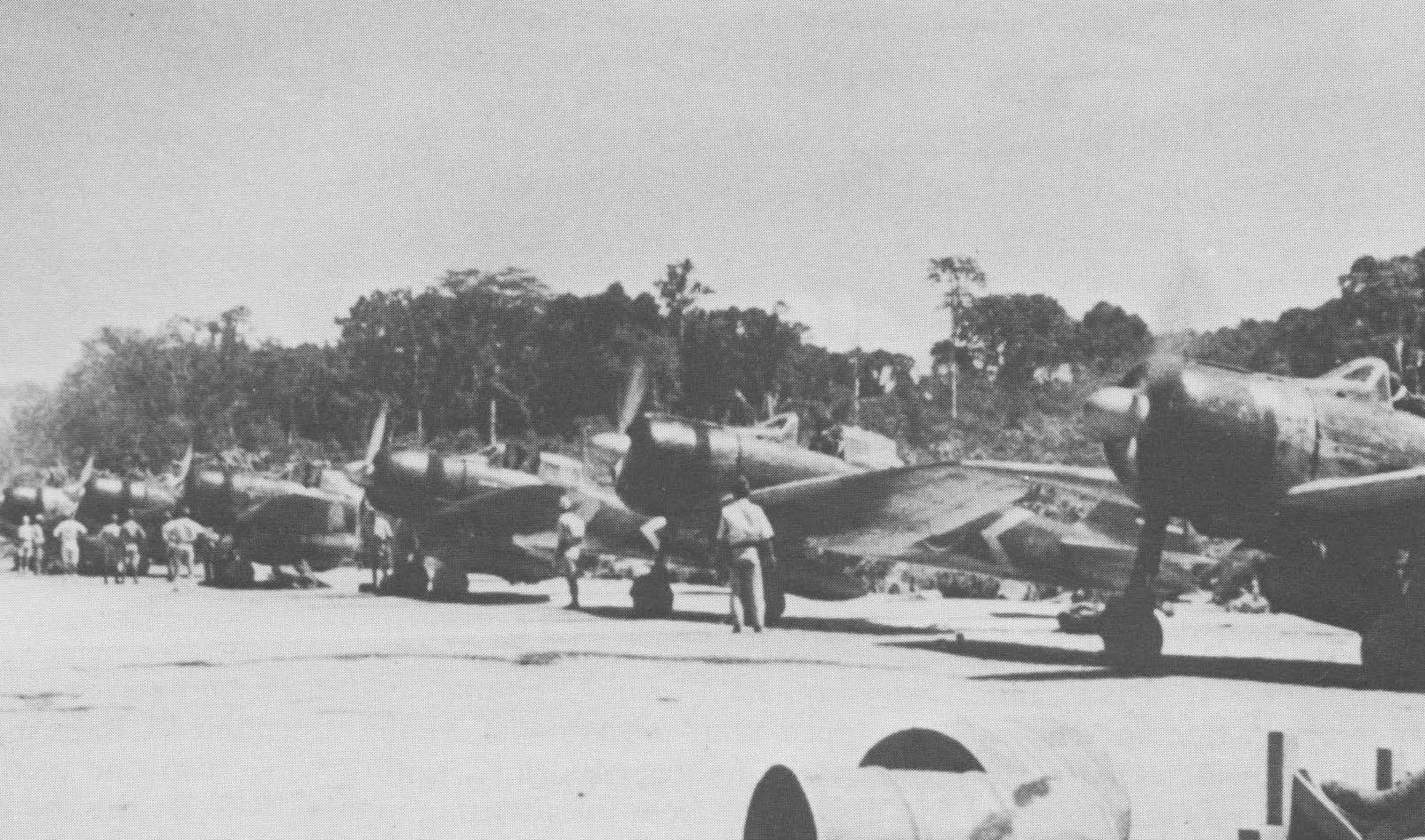
- A6Ms from the Carrier Zuikaku at Kahili in 1943

Site information
- Type: Military Airfield
- Controlled by: Imperial Japanese Navy Air Service
- Condition: abandoned

Location
- Coordinates: 06°43′48.27″S 155°41′1.13″E

Site history
- Built: 1942
- In use: 1942-45
- Materials: coral and bitumen
- Battles/wars: Operation I-Go; Bougainville Campaign

Kahili Airfield, also known as Buin Airfield, was an airfield located near Buin, Bougainville Island, Papua New Guinea.

== History ==
The airfield was constructed by the Imperial Japanese Navy Air Service in November 1942. The airfield was later neutralized by Allied air bombing from 1943 and was abandoned after the cessation of hostilities.

Japanese Units based at Kahili Airfield included:

- 11th Air Fleet
- 201st Kokutai (A6M Zero)
- 204th Kokutai (A6M Zero)
- 582nd Kokutai (D3A Val)
- Hiyo Detachment (A6M Zero)

== See also ==
- Buin Airport
- Buka Airport
- Kieta Airport
