= Aropa Airport =

Airport in Papua New Guinea

- IATA: KIE; ICAO: AYIQ

Summary
- Location: Kieta, Bougainville Island, Papua New Guinea
- Elevation AMSL: 11 ft (3.4 m)
- Coordinates: 06°18′18″S 155°43′40″E

Map
- Location of airport in Papua New Guinea

Runways
Direction	Length		Surface
Direction	m	ft	Surface
14/32	1,645	5,397	Asphalt
- Source: PNG Airstrip Guide

Aropa Airport (or Kieta Airport) is an airport in Kieta, Bougainville Island, Papua New Guinea.

== History ==
The original grass airfield was occupied and expanded by the Imperial Japanese in spring 1942. It then became the target of Allied air bombing from mid-1943 to mid-1944.

After World War II the airport became one of Bougainville's main airports.

The airport was partially destroyed during the Bougainville Crisis of the 1990s and had been closed since then.

For many years the airfield was disused and overgrown with bush.

In February 2012 the owners announced their intention to reopen the airport. In a ceremony held on December 12, 2014 the airport was officially reopened by the Prime Minister of Papua New Guinea, Peter O'Neill, and by the president of the Autonomous Region of Bougainville, John Momis.

For the time being the airport can only accommodate aircraft the size of Bombardier Dash 8 or smaller.

== Airlines and destinations ==
PNG Air connects Aropa Airport to Rabaul Airport.

== See also ==
- Buin Airport
- Buka Airport
- Kahili Airfield

== Bibliography ==
- Odgers, George (1968). Volume II – Air War Against Japan, 1943–1945. Australia in the War of 1939–1945. Canberra: Australian War Memorial. Archived from the original on 22 October 2008.
