= Ugashik Bay Airport =

Airport in Alaska, United States

- IATA: UGB; ICAO: none; FAA LID: UGB

Summary
- Airport type: Public
- Owner: BLM--Division of Lands
- Serves: Pilot Point, Alaska
- Elevation AMSL: 132 ft (40 m)
- Coordinates: 57°25′31″N 157°44′24″W

Map
- Location of airport in Alaska

Runways
Direction	Length		Surface
Direction	ft	m	Surface
12/30	5,280	1,609	Gravel

Statistics (2005)
- Aircraft operations: 50
- Source: Federal Aviation Administration

Ugashik Bay Airport (IATA: UGB, FAA LID: UGB) is a public use airport located 11 nautical miles (13 mi, 20 km) south-southwest of the central business district of Pilot Point, near Ugashik Bay in the Lake and Peninsula Borough of the U.S. state of Alaska. It is owned by the Bureau of Land Management.

== Facilities and aircraft ==
Ugashik Bay Airport has one runway designated 12/30 with a gravel surface measuring 5,280 by 125 feet (1,609 x 38 m). For the 12-month period ending December 31, 2005, the airport had 50 aircraft operations, an average of 4 per month, all general aviation.

== Airline and destination ==
The following airline offers scheduled passenger service:

Airlines	Destinations
Grant Aviation	Chignik Lake, Egegik, King Salmon, Pilot Point

== See also ==
- Ugashik Airport (FAA: 9A8, IATA: UGS) - 57°31′24″N 157°23′46″W
- Pilot Point Airport (FAA: PNP, IATA: PIP, ICAO: PAPN) - 57°34′49″N 157°34′19″W
- List of airports in Alaska
