= Indian Mountain LRRS Airport =

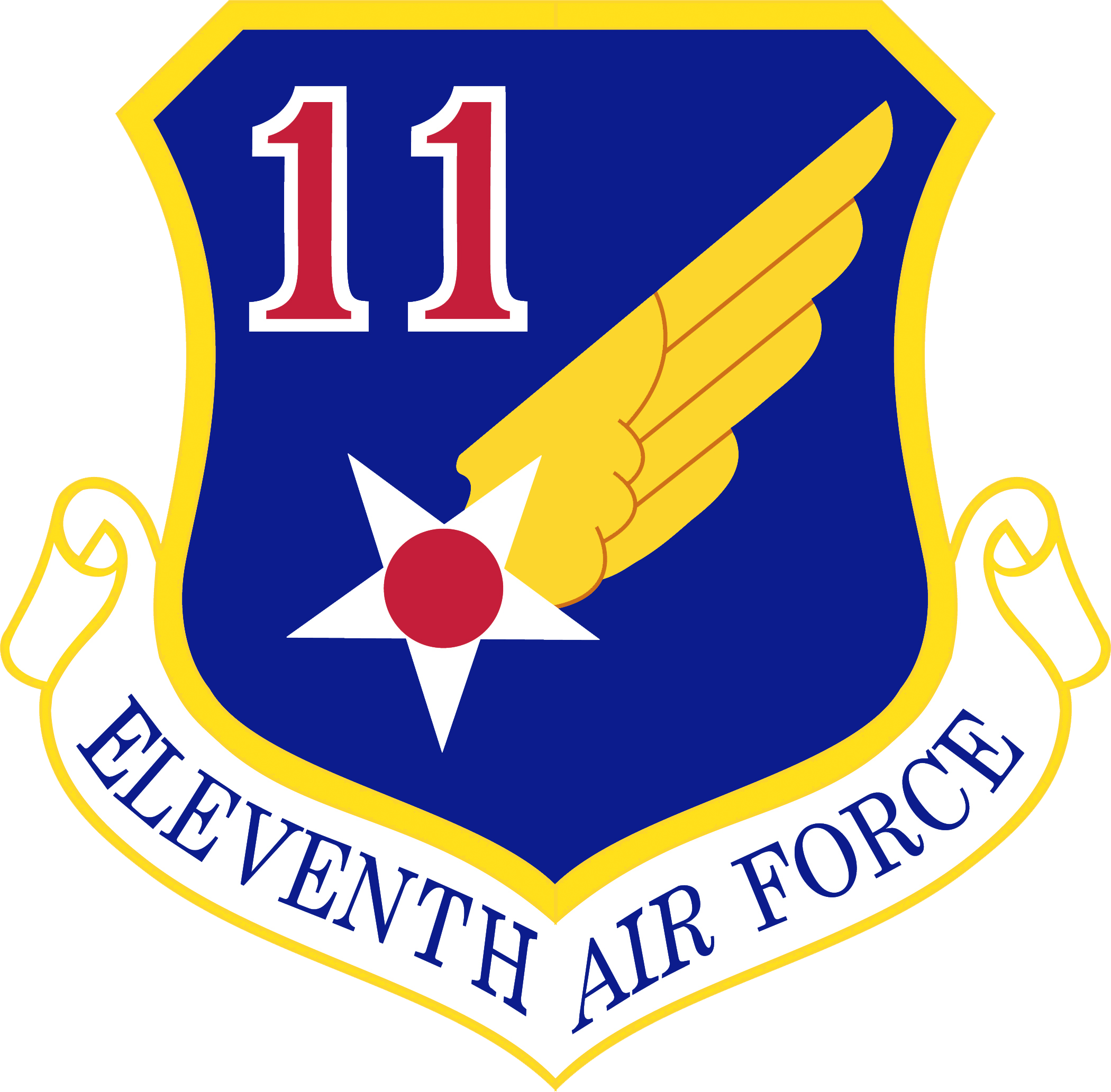
Indian Mountain LRRS Airport
- IATA: UTO; ICAO: PAIM; FAA LID: UTO

Summary
- Airport type: Military
- Owner: U.S. Air Force
- Location: Utopia Creek, Alaska
- Elevation AMSL: 1,273 ft (388 m)
- Coordinates: 65°59′34″N 153°42′14″W

Map
- Location of airport in Alaska

Runways
Direction	Length		Surface
Direction	ft	m	Surface
6/24	4,196	1,279	Gravel
- Source: Federal Aviation Administration

Indian Mountain LRRS Airport (IATA: UTO, ICAO: PAIM, FAA LID: UTO) is a military airstrip located south of Utopia Creek, in the Yukon–Koyukuk Census Area of the U.S. state of Alaska. The airstrip is also located 15.8 miles (25.4 km) east-southeast of Hughes, Alaska. It is not open for public use.

== Overview ==
Indian Mountain Airport is a United States Air Force military airstrip. Its mission is to provide access to the Indian Mountain Long Range Radar Station for servicing and other requirements.

The airstrip was constructed in 1952 during the construction of the Indian Mountain Air Force Station. During the station's operational use as a manned radar station, it provided transportation for station personnel and for supplies and equipment to be airlifted to the station. With the manned radar station's closure in 1983, the airstrip now provides access to the unattended site for maintenance personnel and other requirements.

It is not staffed by any support personnel, and is not open to the public. During the winter months, it may be inaccessible due to the extreme weather conditions at the location.

== Facilities ==
Indian Mountain LRRS has one runway designated 6/24 with a gravel surface measuring 4,196 by 148 feet (1,279 x 45 m).

== Airlines and destinations ==
Airlines	Destinations
Everts Air	Fairbanks
