= Quintanilla de Urz =

Coordinates: 42°02′N 5°51′W

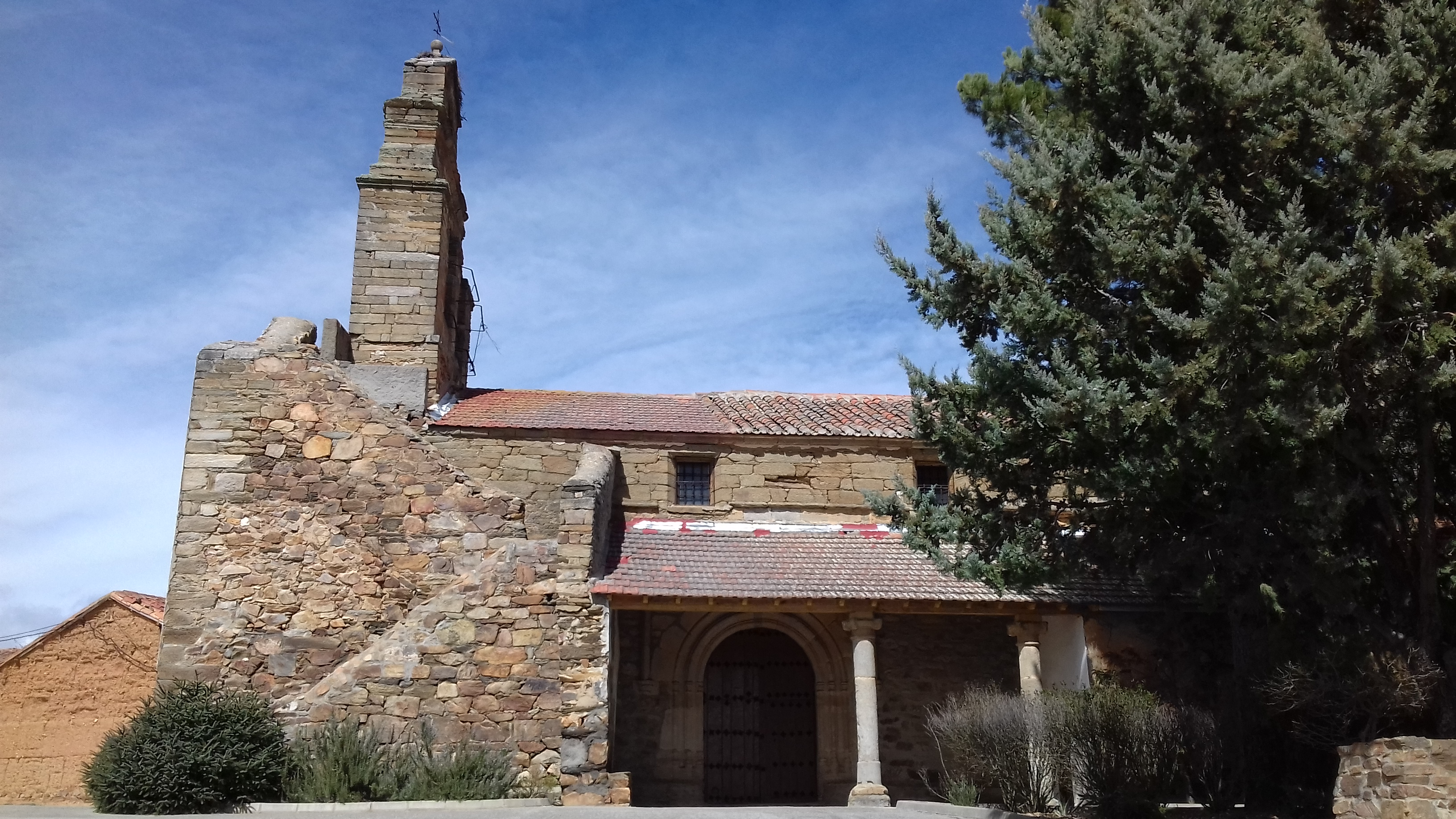
- Interactive map of Quintanilla de Urz
- Country: Spain
- Autonomous community: Castile and León
- Province: Zamora
- Municipality: Quintanilla de Urz

Area
  - Total: 10 km^{2} (3.9 sq mi)

Population (2025-01-01)
  - Total: 98
  - Density: 9.8/km^{2} (25/sq mi)
- Time zone: UTC+1 (CET)
  - Summer (DST): UTC+2 (CEST)

Quintanilla de Urz is a municipality located in the province of Zamora, Castile and León, Spain. According to the 2004 census (INE), the municipality has a population of 146 inhabitants.
