= Buin Airport =

Airport in Bougainville, Papua New Guinea

- IATA: UBI; ICAO: none

Summary
- Serves: Kara, Bougainville Island
- Location: Papua New Guinea
- Coordinates: 06°44′00″S 155°41′06″E
- Interactive map of Buin Airport

Buin Airport (IATA:UBI) was an airport located near Kara, Bougainville Island, Papua New Guinea.

== History ==
Kara Airfield Toripoil Airfield
- Buin, Bougainville Island

Site information
- Type: Military Airfield
- Controlled by: Imperial Japanese Navy Air Service
- Condition: abandoned

Location
- Coordinates: 06°44′00″S 155°41′06″E

Site history
- Built: 1943
- In use: 1943-88
- Materials: coral and bitumen
- Battles/wars: Operation I-Go; Bougainville Campaign

=== World War II ===
The airfield was constructed by the Imperial Japanese Navy Air Service in 1943 and known as Kara Airfield and Toripoil Airfield.

=== Postwar ===
The airport was used by Air Niugini and other local carriers for air service to the Buin area, however the airport was destroyed during the Bougainville Crisis.

== See also ==
- Buka Airport
- Kahili Airfield
- Kieta Airport
