= Umiat Airport =

- IATA: UMT; ICAO: PAUM; FAA LID: UMT

Summary
- Airport type: Public
- Owner: State of Alaska DOT&PF - Northern Region
- Serves: Umiat, Alaska
- Elevation AMSL: 267 ft / 81 m
- Coordinates: 69°22′16″N 152°08′06″W

Map
- Location of airport in Alaska

Runways
Direction	Length		Surface
Direction	ft	m	Surface
6/24	5,583	1,702	Gravel

Statistics (2006)
- Aircraft operations: 200
- Source: Federal Aviation Administration

Umiat Airport (IATA: UMT, ICAO: PAUM, FAA LID: UMT) is a state owned, public use airport located in Umiat, in the North Slope Borough of the U.S. state of Alaska. The original runway was created by Seabees of Construction Battalion Detachment 1058 in 1945. They built it to facilitate the resupply of their drilling operation at Umiat.

As per the Federal Aviation Administration, this airport had 197 passenger boardings (enplanements) in calendar year 2008, 569 in 2009, and 107 in 2010.

== Facilities and aircraft ==
Umiat Airport covers an area of 290 acres (117 ha) at an elevation of 267 feet (81 m) above mean sea level. It has one runway designated 6/24 with a gravel surface measuring 5,583 by 100 feet (1,702 x 30 m). For the 12-month period ending January 1, 2006, the airport had 200 aircraft operations, an average of 16 per month: 50% air taxi and 50% general aviation.

== Statistics ==
Carrier shares: January – December 2013
Carrier	Passengers (arriving and departing)
Hageland	190(91.67%)
Era Aviation	20(8.33%)

Top domestic destinations: Jan. – Dec. 2013
Rank	Destination	Airport	Passengers	
Rank	Destination	Airport	2013	2012
1	Deadhorse, AK	Deadhorse Airport (SCC)	20	20
2	Fairbanks, Alaska	Fairbanks International (FAI)	<10	<10
3	Anchorage, AK	Ted Stevens Anchorage International (ANC)	<10	<10

== See also ==
- List of airports in Alaska
