= Umiat, Alaska =

Unincorporated community in the state of Alaska, United States

Umiat
- Unincorporated community
- Location within the state of Alaska
- Coordinates: 69°22′01″N 152°08′39″W
- Country: United States
- State: Alaska
- Borough: North Slope

Government
  - Borough mayor: Josiah Patkotak
  - State senator: Donald Olson (D)
  - State rep.: Robyn Burke (D)
- Elevation: 259 ft (79 m)
- Time zone: UTC-9 (Alaska (AKST))
  - Summer (DST): UTC-8 (AKDT)
- FIPS code: 02-80250
- GNIS ID: 1411508

Umiat (OO-mee-yat) is an unincorporated community in North Slope Borough, Alaska, United States. It is located on the Colville River, 140 miles southwest of Deadhorse in the Arctic Circle. The town is not accessible by road or rail, only by air or river.

== History ==
The word "umiat" means boats in the Iñupiaq language.

In 1944, the Naval Oil Reserve was set up and it later became an air force base, which is now closed.

In 1946, the Umiat oil pool was discovered in an anticlinal trap and estimated to hold more than 70 million barrels (11 million cubic meters) oil, but was never produced.

In 2009 Governor Parnell budgeted for a proposed road to Umiat branching off of the Dalton Highway.

Umiat has become a center in the summer for research by the BLM and USGS concerning climate change. Research also goes on in the impact that development has on the Arctic tundra. As the NPRA is managed by BLM, they watch the impact that the ice roads and ice-drilling pads have on plant and animal life in the area.

Umiat has no permanent residents, being a camp and fuel stop for aircraft and helicopters operating in the area. The camp is run by a locally owned company that provides oilfield services in the area, their crew consists in the summer of approximately 10 people who work on a two weeks on two weeks off schedule. At any given time, there are between 20 and 30 people lodged and fed there.

The camp operates from the middle of May to the middle of September. The camp has access to the internet, news and entertainment by satellite.

Accommodations are "ATCO" units that are permanently placed; a cafeteria style kitchen is in one of the units.

== Climate ==
Umiat has a subarctic climate (Köppen: Dsc), with long, severely cold winters and short summers with warm days but cool nights (despite the midnight sun.) January is the coldest month, and average temperatures remain below 0 °F (−18 °C) until mid-April. Severe cold can persist well into spring; on April 5, 1995, the temperature fell to −50 °F (−46 °C). Precipitation is irregular and snow has occurred in every month but July. Yearly low temperatures run even colder than Utqiaġvik, Alaska on average. Umiat is the weather station with the lowest average annual temperature in the United States.

Climate data for Umiat, Alaska (1981–2010 normals, extremes 1945–present)
Month	Jan	Feb	Mar	Apr	May	Jun	Jul	Aug	Sep	Oct	Nov	Dec	Year
Record high °F (°C)	41 (5)	37 (3)	40 (4)	51 (11)	79 (26)	88 (31)	92 (33)	90 (32)	75 (24)	52 (11)	43 (6)	37 (3)	92 (33)
Mean maximum °F (°C)	18.8 (−7.3)	20.6 (−6.3)	23.8 (−4.6)	36.8 (2.7)	57.6 (14.2)	80.2 (26.8)	82.0 (27.8)	77.0 (25.0)	61.9 (16.6)	38.9 (3.8)	20.4 (−6.4)	20.4 (−6.4)	83.5 (28.6)
Mean daily maximum °F (°C)	−11.9 (−24.4)	−10.7 (−23.7)	−4.8 (−20.4)	14.5 (−9.7)	36.2 (2.3)	61.4 (16.3)	68.3 (20.2)	59.5 (15.3)	43.6 (6.4)	19.7 (−6.8)	−0.8 (−18.2)	−6.9 (−21.6)	22.3 (−5.4)
Daily mean °F (°C)	−21.3 (−29.6)	−20.2 (−29.0)	−16.9 (−27.2)	2.4 (−16.4)	26.5 (−3.1)	49.2 (9.6)	55.0 (12.8)	47.9 (8.8)	35.0 (1.7)	11.5 (−11.4)	−8.5 (−22.5)	−16.5 (−26.9)	12.0 (−11.1)
Mean daily minimum °F (°C)	−30.7 (−34.8)	−29.8 (−34.3)	−29.0 (−33.9)	−9.7 (−23.2)	16.8 (−8.4)	37.0 (2.8)	41.8 (5.4)	36.2 (2.3)	26.3 (−3.2)	3.3 (−15.9)	−16.2 (−26.8)	−26.2 (−32.3)	1.6 (−16.9)
Mean minimum °F (°C)	−52.5 (−46.9)	−54.6 (−48.1)	−50.2 (−45.7)	−36.0 (−37.8)	−7.5 (−21.9)	24.7 (−4.1)	30.8 (−0.7)	22.6 (−5.2)	11.9 (−11.2)	−23.3 (−30.7)	−42.5 (−41.4)	−50.9 (−46.1)	−58.3 (−50.2)
Record low °F (°C)	−62 (−52)	−66 (−54)	−63 (−53)	−50 (−46)	−22 (−30)	9 (−13)	24 (−4)	5 (−15)	−6 (−21)	−38 (−39)	−56 (−49)	−58 (−50)	−66 (−54)
Average precipitation inches (mm)	0.38 (9.7)	0.19 (4.8)	0.24 (6.1)	0.24 (6.1)	0.05 (1.3)	0.33 (8.4)	0.76 (19)	0.95 (24)	0.31 (7.9)	0.56 (14)	0.39 (9.9)	0.41 (10)	4.81 (122)
Average snowfall inches (cm)	4.5 (11)	2.4 (6.1)	2.3 (5.8)	1.9 (4.8)	1.2 (3.0)	0.2 (0.51)	0.0 (0.0)	0.2 (0.51)	2.6 (6.6)	8.5 (22)	5.2 (13)	4.2 (11)	33.2 (84)
Average precipitation days (≥ 0.01 inch)	3.7	2.2	1.7	2.0	0.8	2.4	3.3	5.2	3.5	6.3	4.6	4.1	39.8
Source 1: NOAA
Source 2: XMACIS2 (mean maxima/minima 1981–2010), WRCC (snowfall)

== Transportation ==
Umiat Airport is a state owned, public use airport located in Umiat.
