= Brime de Urz =

Place in Castile and León, Spain

Coordinates: 42°02′N 5°52′W

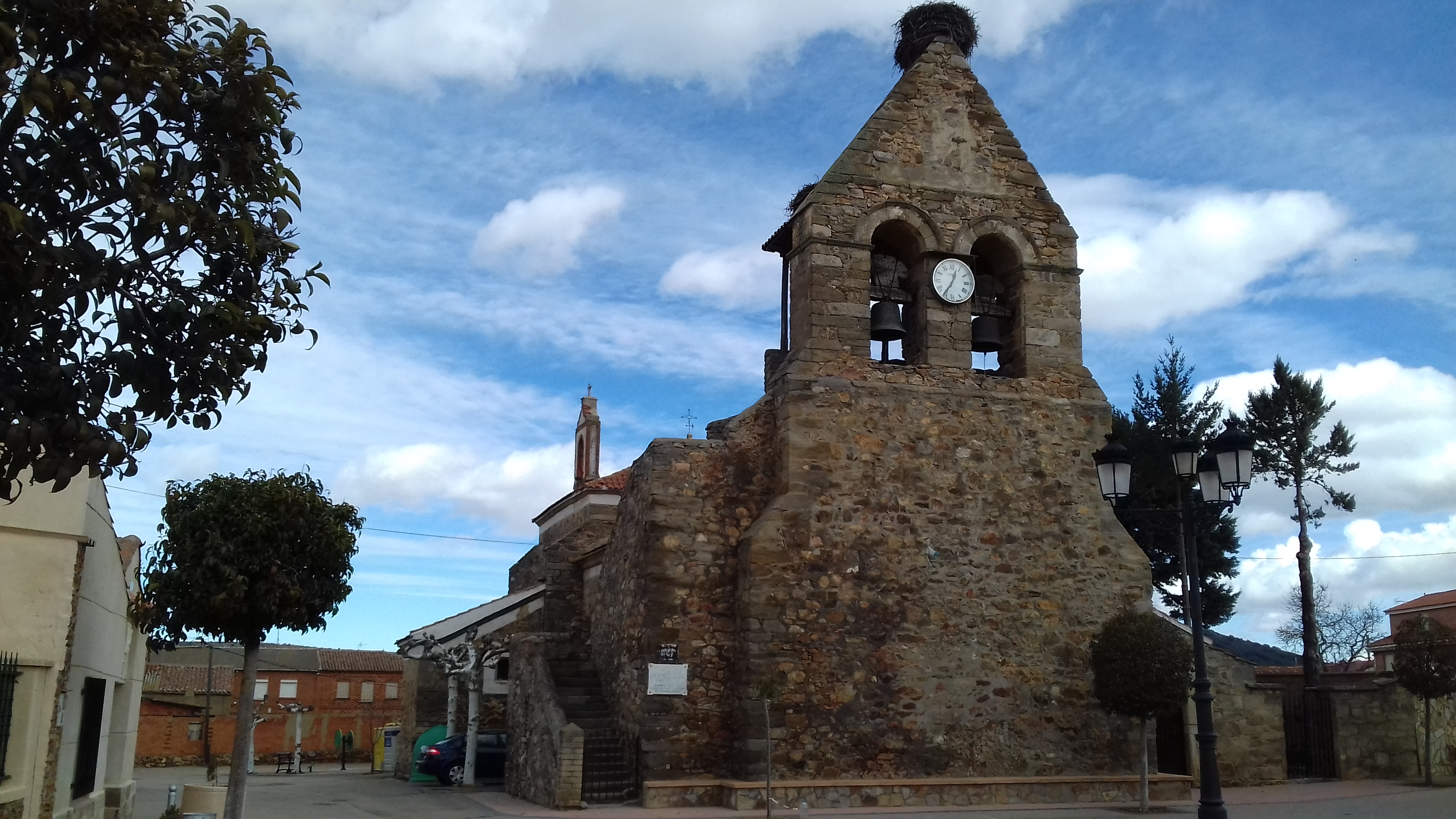
- Interactive map of Brime de Urz
- Country: Spain
- Autonomous community: Castile and León
- Province: Zamora
- Municipality: Brime de Urz

Area
  - Total: 14 km^{2} (5.4 sq mi)

Population (2025-01-01)
  - Total: 96
  - Density: 6.9/km^{2} (18/sq mi)
- Time zone: UTC+1 (CET)
  - Summer (DST): UTC+2 (CEST)

Brime de Urz is a municipality located in the province of Zamora, Castile and León, Spain. According to the 2004 census (INE), the municipality has a population of 153 inhabitants.
