= Uljin Airport =

Partially finished airport near Uljin County, South Korea

Coordinates: 36°46′12″N 129°27′55″E

Uljin Airfield (IATA: UJN, ICAO: RKTL) (Korean: 울진비행장) is a partially finished airport near Uljin County, South Korea.

== History ==
Construction was suspended in 2005 after the airport was 85% complete. The Board of Audit and Inspection halted construction after it was determined no airline wanted to use the airport. The airport subsequently gained international media attention. As of 2009, there were plans to maybe use the airport for pilot training.

== Facilities ==
The airport features single runway (17/35) which is 1,800 metres (5,900 ft) long and 45 metres (150 ft) wide. The runways are equipped with ILS. arp elevation is 175ft.
