= Buin, Papua New Guinea =

Buin
- Town
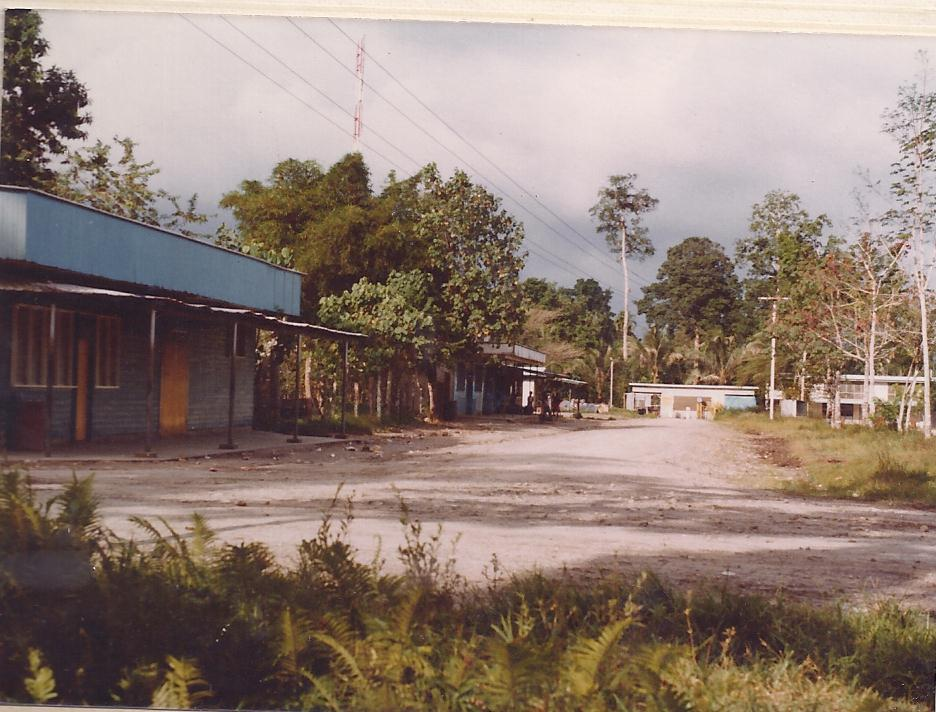
- Main Street, 1978

- Location in Papua New Guinea
- Coordinates: 6.746°S 155.685°E
- Country: Papua New Guinea
- Province: Autonomous Region of Bougainville
- District: South Bougainville District

Population (2018)
  - Total: 750
- Time zone: UTC+10 (AEST)
- Climate: Af: Tropical rainforest climate

Buin is a town on Bougainville Island, and the capital of the South Bougainville District, in the Autonomous Region of Bougainville, in eastern Papua New Guinea. The island is in the northern Solomon Islands Archipelago of the Melanesia region, in the South Pacific Ocean.

It is a government-established town in the jungle, now inland from the coast, where its sea-landing predecessor of the same name was located. The town is in an autonomous region of Papua New Guinea established in 2000, and was the former North Solomons Province (1976–2000).

== History ==
Buin and Bougainville Island gained world attention with the Japanese Army's occupation in 1942, World War II, and the subsequent American counterattack in November 1943.

After the war, the present-day town of Buin was established, inland to the north from its original location, which had been a minimal point of sea-landing on the coast.

In 1943, Imperial Japanese Navy Admiral Isoroku Yamamoto was flying over Buin in his G4M "Betty" bomber. A squadron of American P-38 Lightnings flying up from Guadalcanal ambushed Yamamoto’s bomber, killing him when the "Betty" crashed.

During the late 1960s, Buin became a regional center of government, commercial, and education activity. After Bougainville Copper, Ltd., was established, it came to national prominence as the source of a large proportion of the country's financial base. The town was isolated from contact and commercial activity during the 1990s Bougainville Civil War. In 2000, it fell within the Autonomous Region of Bougainville in Papua New Guinea, upon the Autonomous Region's establishment.

=== German New Guinea ===
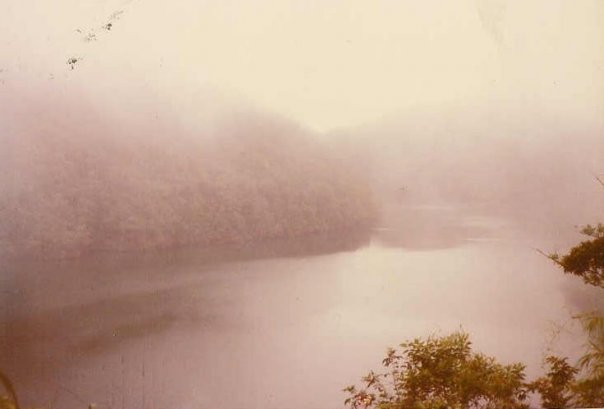
Lake Loloru, a volcanic crater lake northeast of Buin, where south Bougainvillean people believe deceased souls live.

Buin was within German New Guinea from 1884 to 1919. Three anthropologists explored traditional cultures in Bougainville in the 1930s, one in Siwai, the ethnically and culturally closely related region immediately to the west of the later Buin; another in the region of the long-established east-coast town of Kieta to the north. They published widely read books.

One Chinese trade-store family arrived during German period before World War I, four of whose members ultimately continued running Buin trade stores until the political and military crisis which began in 1988. The Germans, though not the later Australians, permitted Chinese immigration.

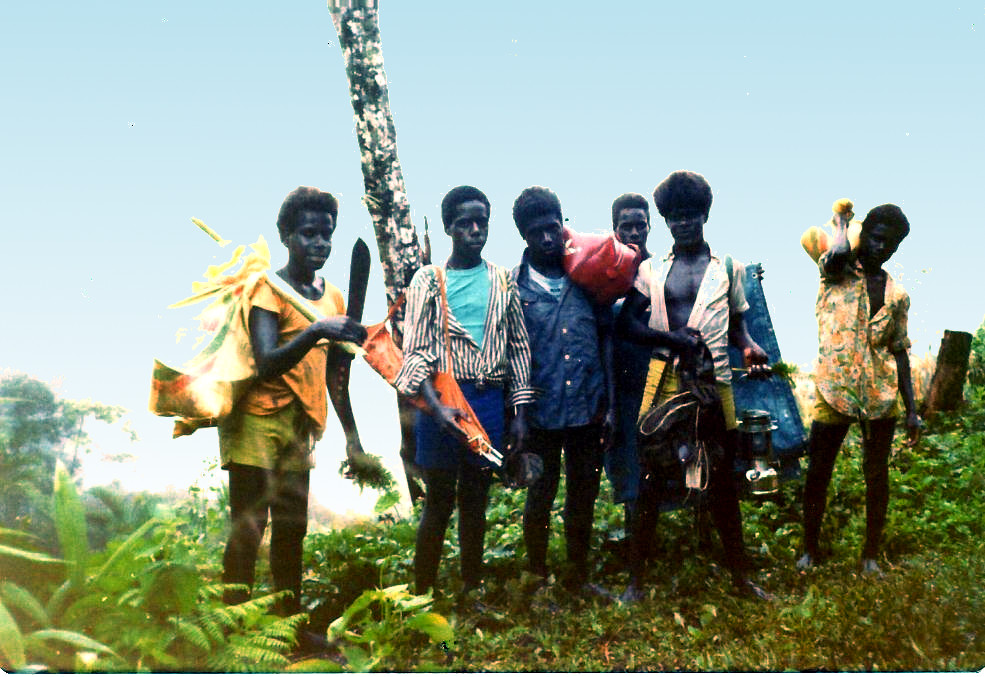
Buin and Siwai boys visiting Lake Loloru.

Roman Catholics and Methodists (from 1968 the United Church in Papua New Guinea and the Solomon Islands) established missions early in German times in the region of what later became Buin, a small number of other Christian denominations also later establishing a smaller presence. A Roman Catholic nunnery was very early established immediately adjacent to the later Buin airfield. Pre-Christian traditional beliefs of course remained alive, including the firm one that souls of the deceased remained alive on Lake Loloru in a volcano northeast of the later Buin, and powerful men continued taking multiple wives. On the other hand, a strong tradition of intelligent and talented women having considerable influence remained vastly important. Indigenous Roman Catholic nuns and female Methodist ministers became deeply appreciated.

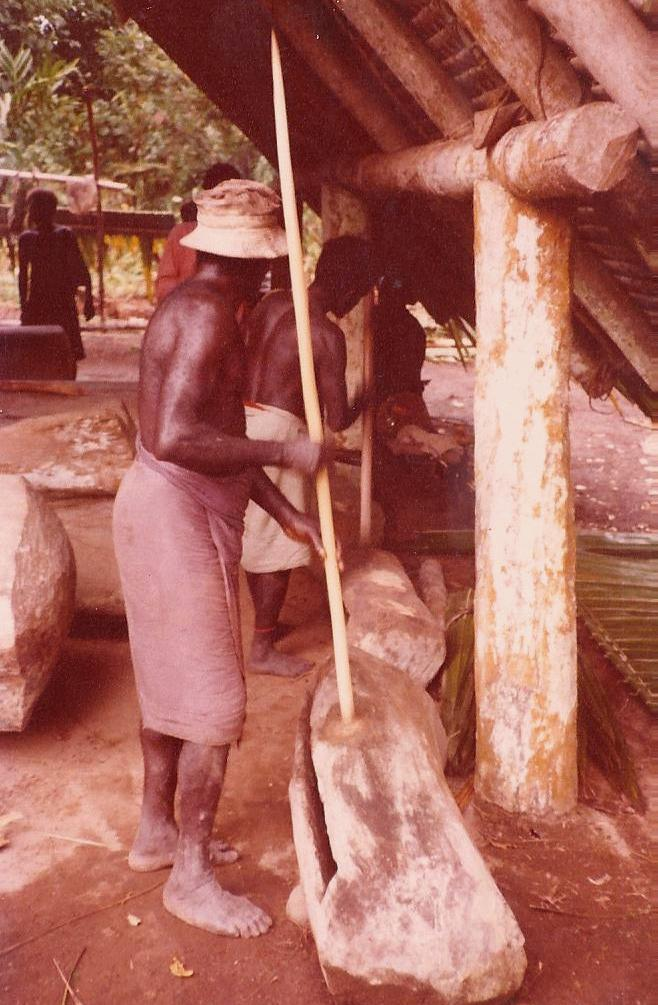
Men of a village immediately outside Buin engaging in traditional drumming, conveying coded messages.

=== Territory of New Guinea ===
Buin was within the Territory of New Guinea, a Mandate of the League of Nations, that consisted of the northeastern part of the island of New Guinea and a number of outlying islands. It was wholly controlled by Australia during 1920–1942 and during 1945–1949 and mostly occupied by Japan during World War II, between 1942 and 1945.

In 1914, Australia seized German New Guinea which included Bougainville and Buka as the northernmost two islands of the Solomon Islands, which Germany and Great Britain had divided between them, the south of which had been taken by Great Britain. Despite Australia's remaining a British colony until the Statute of Westminster of 1931, affirmed its independence when the "autonomous Communities within the British Empire [became] equal in status, in no way subordinate one to another" within a "British Commonwealth of Nations" despite Australia's not accepting such sovereignty until 1942 with the Statute of Westminster Adoption Act 1942. Australia took virtually no steps to develop this remote part of Papua and New Guinea, apart from minimally developing the small towns of Kieta, Buka Town, and Buin (initially on the south coast), and permitting plantations to be established from Kieta up the coast to Buka.

Indeed, one of the most widely read books on pre-World War II Bougainville was Douglas L. Oliver’s A Solomon Island Society: Kinship and Leadership Among the Siwui [sic] of Bougainville, a lengthy report of his 1938–39 anthropological study of a village in Siwai. Oliver made no mention of the coastal port of Buin, though would necessarily have been where he landed and entered. Nor did he mention it in his Bougainville: A Personal History or Black Islanders: A Personal Perspective of Bougainville 1937–1991.

The Vienna-born and ultimately also US-based anthropologist Richard Thurnwald, (1869–1954), “one of the most productive ethnologists of his time,” wrote two published studies of people in the region of today’s Buin, both in English: Profane Literature of Buin and Pigs and Currency in Buin (1934)

For the societies of Buin…colonial rule signified a political revolution. Until after World War I these societies were hierarchical. A chiefly class, possibly descended from earlier invaders, ruled over a lower class of bondsmen and a middle class of minei or people born of mixed marriages between the other two classes. A bondsman was his chief’s property, and could be sold simply for the use of his severed head; he was not permitted to look at the wife or daughter of a chief, and partly for this reason, the people lived in scattered hamlets rather than villages. Australian patrol officers were soon insisting however, that the people live in villages, and that the houses be built in straight lines. A lined village was the Australian idea of neat orderly living, but it was bitterly resisted by the chiefs because they feared the indecency of their women being seen by bondsmen.

=== World War II ===
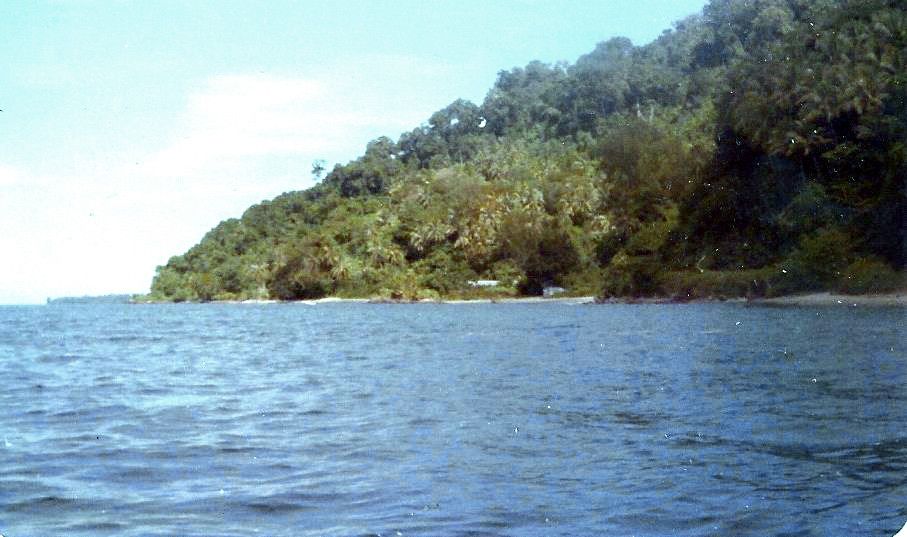
Buin's site until World War II and what is called by prewar references as Buin in anthropological books.

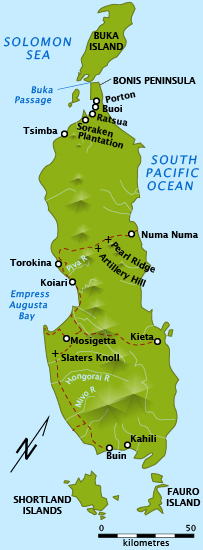
Bougainville and Buka in 1945 when Buin was on the coast and Kahili still had significance, later being only a minor Methodist and then United Church regional center.

The Imperial Japanese Army occupied Bougainville in early 1942, building two air bases on the southern end of the island, one at the site of what would become Buin after the War and the other at Kahili.

The Japanese established themselves in the north adjacent to the Buka Passage, in the east around Kieta, and in the south at Buin early in March 1942….For the first year of their occupation they concentrated mainly on airfields at either end of the island. They paid little attention to the interior, supplying coastal garrisons by barge….The native population throughout much of the island had little to do with the Japanese until well into 1943. Most of those in the southern and northern areas in direct contact with the occupiers accommodated themselves to their conquerors and worked in the various building projects needed by the Japanese army and naval units.”

The northern tip of the island was the home of the third air base, and the fourth was across the Buka passage on Buka. Buin briefly attained worldwide attention when on 18 April 1943 a Japanese Navy airplane carrying Fleet Admiral Isoroku Yamamoto, then on a tour of forward bases, was shot down near there. The architect of the Japanese Navy's air attack on Pearl Harbor that brought the USA into the war, Yamamoto was the commander-in-chief of the Imperial Japanese Navy. The ambush was carried out by P-38 Lightnings flying from Guadalcanal. Yamamoto's airplane crashed just north of the later site of Buin.

"It was obvious to the planners that Japanese air power sited at Rabaul and at the Bougainville fields of Kahili, Buin, Kieta, and Buka must be neutralized before the Empress Augusta Bay operation could take place.”

In November, 1943, U.S. Marines under the command of Admiral William F. Halsey, Jr., landed on Bougainville. The Americans were looking for airfields to help support operations up the Solomons chain. Instead of attempting to seize the Japanese airfields against the teeth of the Japanese defenses, Halsey landed his 14,000 Marines at Empress Augusta Bay, bypassing the Japanese strongpoints. There they worked inland and built their own airfields at Torokina and Piva, setting up a defensive perimeter around them. Halsey left the northern and southern portions of Bougainville in Japanese hands. “The timing of the Treasuries operation [by the New Zealanders and Americans, to gain control from the Japanese of the Treasuries Islands, immediately to the south of Bougainville]…was also designed to confuse the Japanese as to the major location of the major effort in the northern Solomons and to keep them from shifting any significant number of troops away from the Buin area….

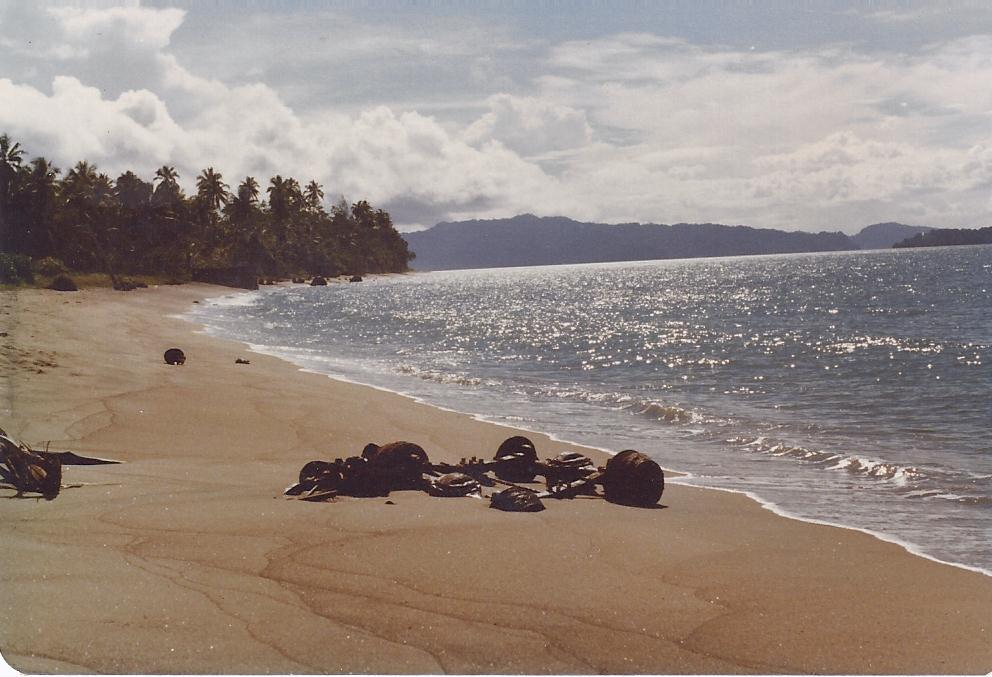
World War II remains decades later.

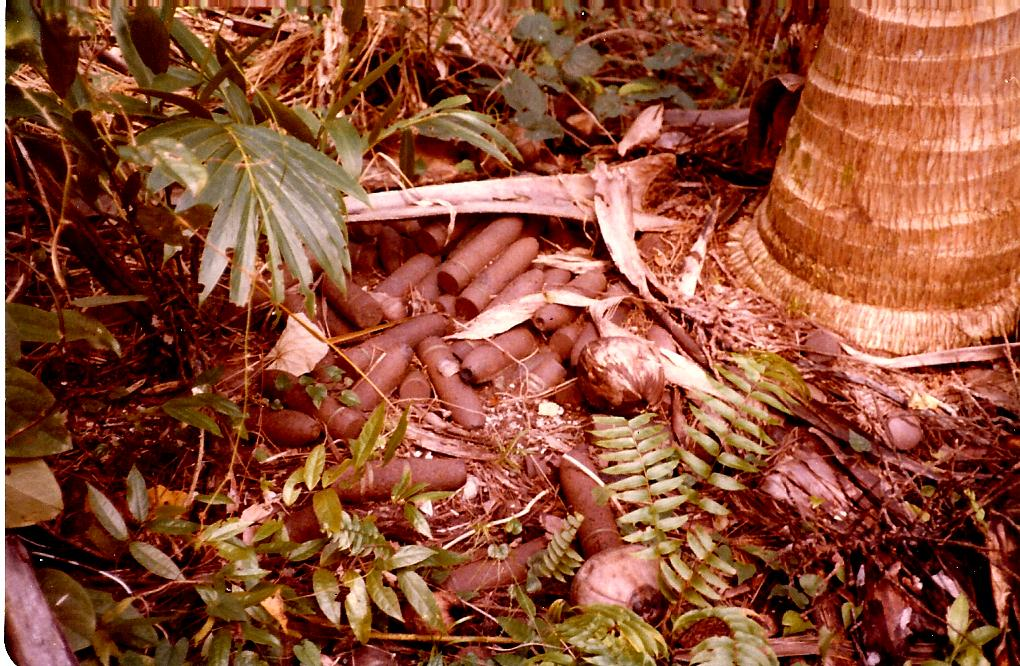
World War II military shells near Buin.

“On Bougainville [by mid-1944] the Japanese were forced to retreat north to Bonis Peninsula and Buka island, and south around Buin.” In late 1944, the Australian Army took over responsibility for clearing of Japanese troops from the island, and they slowly began to advance south from Torokina towards Buin where the main Japanese forces were located. “By the end of June [1945] in the major area of operations, southern Bougainville,…it was estimated…that the Japanese army had dwindled to approximately 14,000 men…. Over eight thousand were in the Buin area, now only thirty miles from the advancing Australians."

Stiff Japanese resistance and heavy rains, however, brought the advance to a halt in July 1945, just after the Australians reached the Mivo River. As a result Buin remained under Japanese control until the end of the war in August 1945. The northern and western Solomons long remained world-famous because two later presidents of the USA served in the U.S. Navy in this area, Lt. Richard Nixon on Green Island just north of Buka, and Lt. John F. Kennedy on a patrol torpedo boat based on Rendova Island.

During the 1970s, there were expeditions to Buin by large groups of Japanese to find the bones of fathers and grandfathers killed in South Bougainville during the war, to cremate the remains, and take them home to Japan. Many also visited Yamamoto's wrecked airplane and obtained accommodation at the Buin High School, bringing substantial gifts of books for the school library.

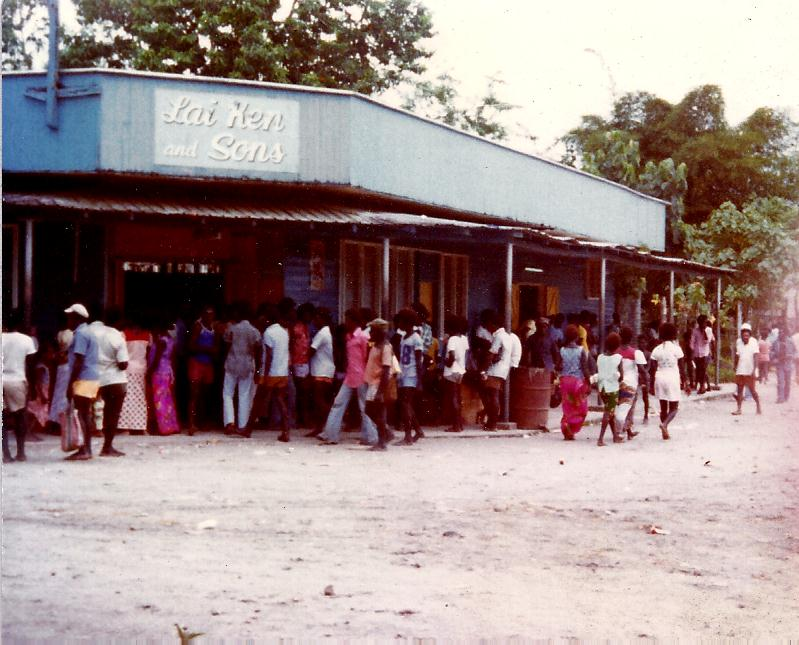
Buin trade store on a Saturday morning, 1978

=== Post-World War II development ===
“To replace and improve livestock destroyed during the war, the Department [of Agriculture] built pig-breeding centres at Lae, Madang, Wewak, Aitape, Manus, Sohano and Buin; and day-old chickens were flown in from Australia, reared, and distributed.” “Around…[1967], developments in timber and road metal in the Buin area of South Bougainville were handled with … contempt for villagers.

In order to try and entrench itself among Bougainvilleans, CRA [Bougainville Copper Ltd.] suavely hired a miscellany of experts, including at least three noted anthropologists. One of these, professor Douglas Oliver of Harvard and the East-West Centre of Hawaii, had already written a masterly ethnographic study of the Siwai of South Bougainville dating back to 1938–39. His published advice to CRA shows no awareness of the political implications of mining, but merely a facile optimism that the people he portrayed to CRA shareholders as simply primitive and superstitious ‘will probably get used to the Company’s presence.’”

Bougainville Copper commenced operation of the mine at Panguna in 1972. Australia had begun to take interest in Bougainville with the establishment of Bougainville Copper. This was when development of Buin became serious, together with that of the by-then long-established Kieta and additional towns in the region. These included the new Arawa, which became the capital when provincial status was established in 1975 — substantially at the urging of the Buin political leader, figure of national eminence in Papua New Guinea and Roman Catholic priest, (Father) John Momis.

Although large expatriate plantations were established from Arawa northwards along the northeastern coast to and including Buka, such activity did not occur in the Buin region, although a Chinese-run trade store was established during the German period, and four family members continued running trade stores at Buin, one continuing until the crisis beginning in 1988.

==== Early provincial self-government ====
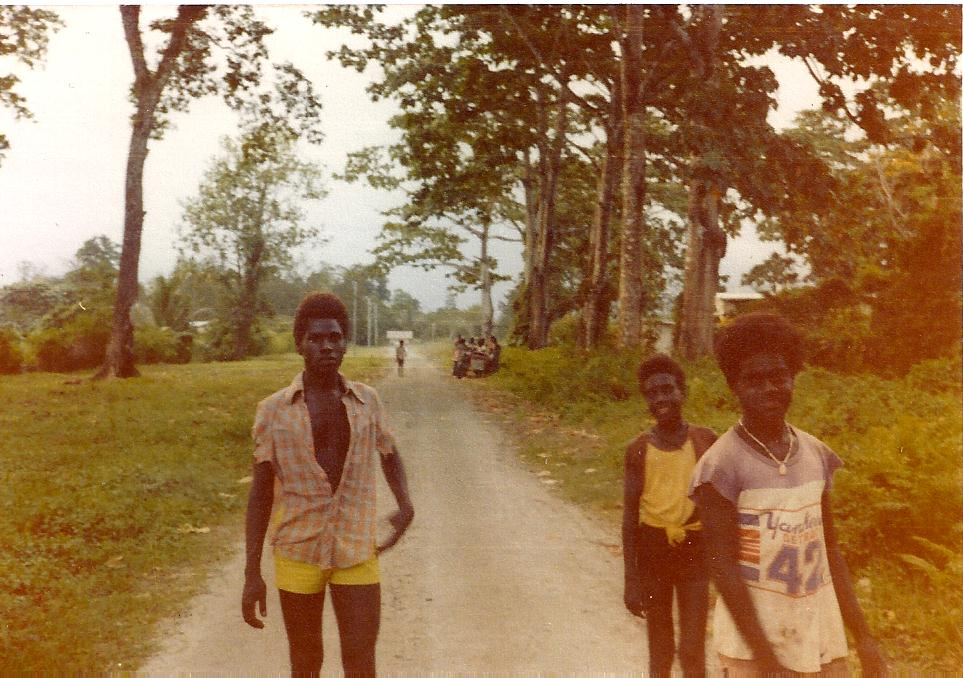
Buin High School students en route from town to school, 1978

In 1973, Papua New Guinea was granted self-government, and then independence in September 1975 from Australian government rule on orders by the United Nations, some 30 years ahead of plan. Not long thereafter, Bougainville declared independence from Papua New Guinea, causing PNG to invade Bougainville with the military support of both the Australian and New Zealander governments in an attempt to secure control of the lucrative Panguna Copper Mine, from which the Papua New Guinea government and Australian shareholders obtained significant wealth. In times of economic vitality before road transportation existed, from southern Bougainville through Buin northeast to Kieta and Arawa, people went to Buin, and in the days before it became common to hear and speak Tok Pisin (until recently referred to in English as New Guinea Pidgin, and still by Anglophone Papua New Guineans), one could hear not only Buin's Telei language, but also a great deal of Siwai's Korokoro Motuna.

==== Local autonomy ====
When Bougainville again declared independence from Papua New Guinea in 1990, Buin erupted with a storm of local activity, including the destruction of the local council building blocks, and large craters being dug out of the local airport with bulldozers to ensure that PNG forces could not land there. The local goal (?) being torn apart and carried down the main street of Buin and dumped in front of the council buildings. The locals formed a strong rebel army, and they fought back and through a bloody and horrible series of battles, PNG and its allies Australia and New Zealand were ejected from the island, which reportedly still widely yearns to become an independent state.

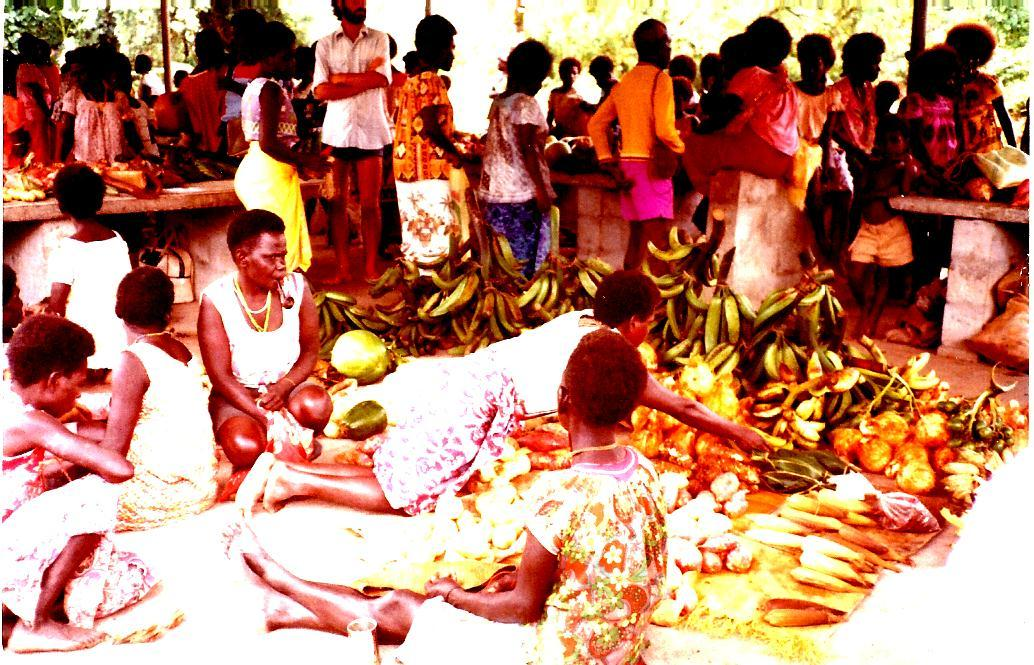
Buin Saturday market in 1978

== Economy ==
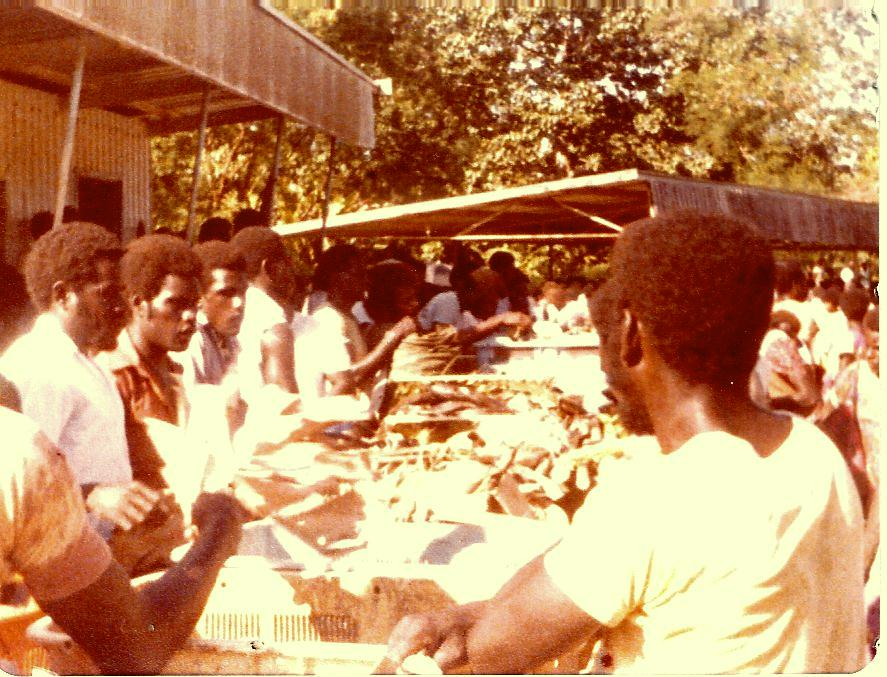
Shortland Island fishermen at Saturday Buin market

=== Commerce and town social activities ===
During its heyday, Buin was an affluent town. Access to Kieta and Arawa for selling cocoa and buying supplies, previously accessible only by northwest road via Panguna through mountains, became available more directly on a new highway from Buin northeast along the coast. There were a medical clinic and active government offices. Its main street had four trade stores, three run by Chinese and white Australian families (ethnically Chinese having been resident in PNG since German rule before the beginning of World War I in 1914), and one run by the local people. There was a bank, a men's pub, and a large Saturday fish, fruit, and vegetable market. Despite its lack of a hotel, foreign tourists arrived frequently, including aforementioned Japanese seeking remains of forefathers from World War II, and coming both from Kieta and Arawa on the eastern coast of Bougainville and from the south in the Solomons by boat. The obligatory local drinking pub, a post office, and a running subbranch of the Bank of Papua New Guinea, local weekly market filled with local trade including local fruit (guava, paw-paw (papaya), and mangoes), vegetables (cumu, taro, sweet potatoes, and pumpkin), fish of all types brought by Shortland Islanders, local fresh water crayfish, and fowl, including domestic chickens and local wild fowls. Bats and possums were often featured as well.

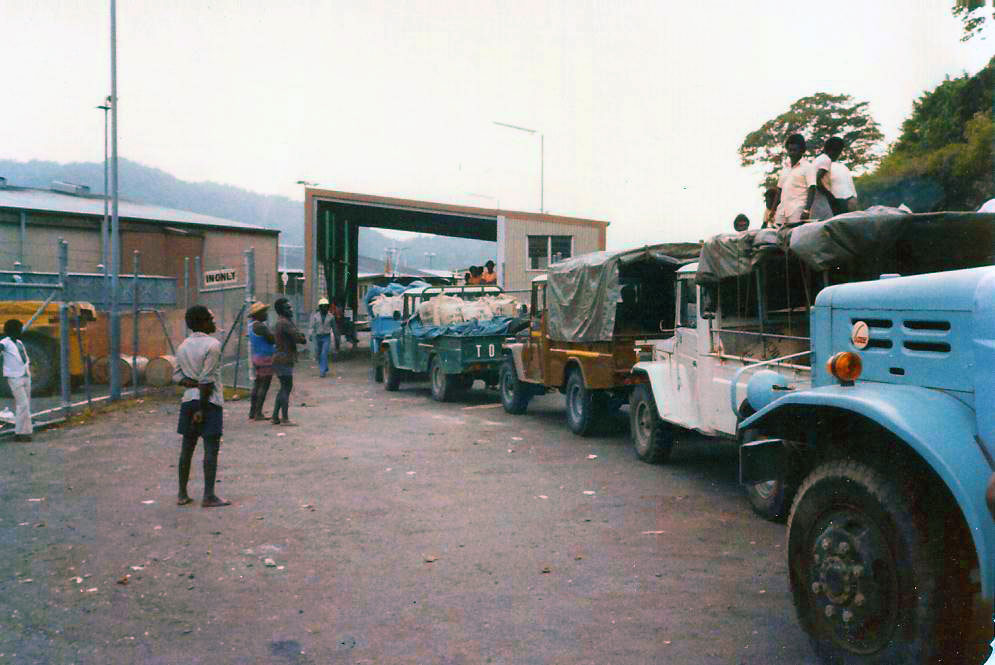
Buin and Siwai villagers delivering cocoa to Arawa port when road along the east coast had not yet been built.

Encounters with local people, both town and nearby village dwellers, were common. There was a thriving Saturday market with fruit and vegetables brought by nearby villagers, fish and shellfish by Treasury Islanders, the international boundary not being closely monitored. The precise national border between Bougainville and the rest of the Solomons can be confusing, and international maps can be openly mistaken. The Google map on the Internet shows no national border between Bougainville and Shortland Island and with the light official policing of such matters, so far from border crossing points, fishermen wishing to sell at the Buin Saturday markets would not encounter any border guards wish to see passports. “In the last two decades of the 19th century, the national border between Bougainville, part of German New Guinea, and the rest of the Solomons, a British colony, changed several times. The islands of Bougainville and Buka in the Solomons Group were added in 1886 and remain[ed] as part of Papua New Guinea in 1979, but the Shortland Islands, Choiseul and Ysabel were German only from 1886 until 1899. In a deal … concluded in 1899, Britain extended her Solomons border northwards to the Buin Straight south of Bougainville.” Village women always wore blouses to Saturday markets as to religious services, though as elsewhere in Bougainville and Buka they often went topless when not attending such functions.

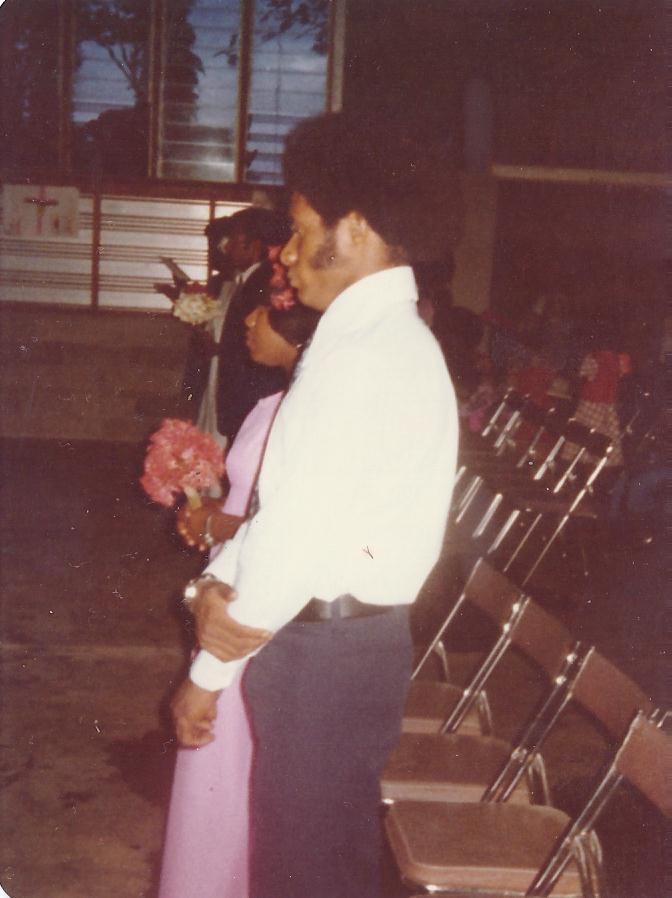
Wedding of Papuan Anglican groom and Buin Roman Catholic bride in Buin Catholic church

== Culture ==
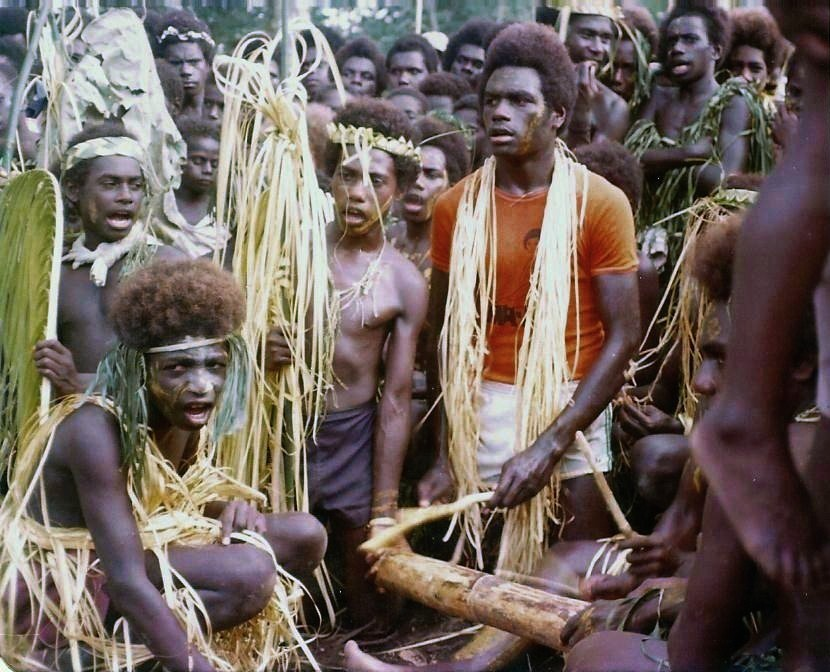
Buka men performing at a Buin civic folk festival

The eminent anthropologist Douglas Oliver, who visited and extensively studied southern Bougainville's peoples and cultures from the 1930s through the 1980s, wrote many books including Southern Bougainville (1968) which has been summarized "The Greater Buin Plain of southern Bougainville provides a complex picture of similarities and diversity. From northwest to southeast, a clearly marked range in emphasis from maternal to paternal ties and descent is paralleled by a shift in the bases of the status hierarchy, from kinship and age (northwest) to greater stress on renown and a system of inherited class-status. These are considered in relation to differences in leadership. Defining "political" broadly on the criterion of a group's corporate title(s) to the territory it normally occupies, the paper suggests that, in addition to cumulative change, all of these factors can be seen in terms of cyclical change between two sharply contrasting types of political unit."

=== Religion ===
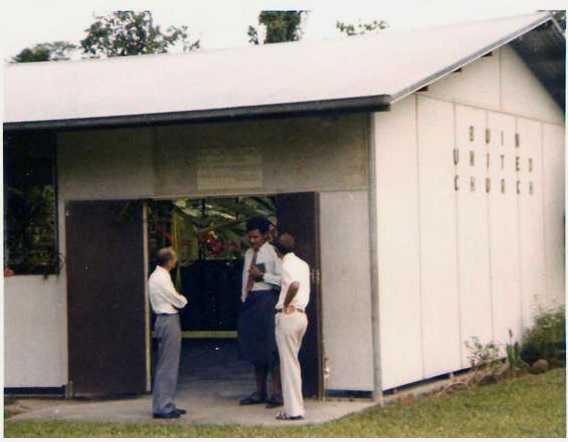
Buin United Church in 1977. The ministers are from Fiji.

A Roman Catholic parish church and a United Church congregational church both thrived. Anglican clergmeny would visit to participate in intermarriages of local Roman Catholics with resident Papuans; a Canadian Anglican archbishop visited en route to a world conference in England, causing a long-term link to be established between Canada and the southern Solomons, where Australia did not greatly contribute. Douglas Oliver, an anthropologist of Harvard University and later the University of Hawaii who gained world fame with A Solomon Island Society, 1938 after study in Siwai and The Pacific Islands was frequently consulted by Bougainville Copper and often visited Buin in the 1970s, where well-read people were pleased to meet and talk with him, inter alia as to his knowledge of by then past traditions which he knew from his aboriginal studies in Siwai in 1938–39. There was an annual folk festival on the parkland immediately south of town and next to the high school, with folk dancing and traditional music from all Bougainvillean ethnic groups having access, often including a few New Guinea Highlands people in traditional festive dress. Buin High School had a massive folk festival on its school grounds open to the public, with entertainment and sales pavilions.

=== Education ===
Very well established primary, high, and building and technical schools functioned, the high school with a province-wide enrollment of some 450 students. Secondary school students had once been forbidden by Australian Marist Brothers to speak indigenous languages though foreign teachers of nationalities other than Australian — British and Canadian — urged that such rule be modified; students were allowed to speak their own languages on weekends and they soon picked up New Guinea Pidgin ("Tok Pisin," as Australian academics lately insist it be called in English) for communicating in languages other than their own—secondary students were from all over Bougainville and Buka with a few from elsewhere in the New Guinea Islands and mainland New Guinea whose parents were employees in Bougainville -— or English and New Guinea Pidgin. Academic standards were remarkably high, with the 80 grade-10 graduates initially moving on to post-grade 10 schools elsewhere in the country at a rate of a handful of 80 but it quickly moving to over 75. Unlike in Enga Province and elsewhere in the New Guinea Highlands where Australian academic supervisors insisted that day students be allowed to take books home despite the warning that that would result in parents tearing them up to roll cigarettes, Buin High School students rejoiced in ample library books, borrowed them both at school and to take home, and read them thoroughly. Sporting activities at Buin High were extremely lively on well-kept fields, as were cultural exhibitions and exchanges and choir singing.

The vocational school teaching building and mechanical skills, with Filipino teaching staff, thrived.

== Climate ==
Buin has a tropical rainforest climate (Af) with heavy to very heavy rainfall year-round. Unlike many places in Papua New Guinea, Buin and the southern coast of Bougainville island experience a rainfall maximum during the south-east monsoon (low sun season).

Climate data for Buin
Month	Jan	Feb	Mar	Apr	May	Jun	Jul	Aug	Sep	Oct	Nov	Dec	Year
Mean daily maximum °C (°F)	30.7 (87.3)	30.7 (87.3)	30.6 (87.1)	30.2 (86.4)	29.9 (85.8)	29.3 (84.7)	29.0 (84.2)	29.4 (84.9)	29.6 (85.3)	30.1 (86.2)	30.5 (86.9)	30.9 (87.6)	30.1 (86.1)
Daily mean °C (°F)	27.1 (80.8)	27.1 (80.8)	27.1 (80.8)	26.9 (80.4)	26.8 (80.2)	26.2 (79.2)	26.1 (79.0)	26.2 (79.2)	26.3 (79.3)	26.7 (80.1)	27.0 (80.6)	27.2 (81.0)	26.7 (80.1)
Mean daily minimum °C (°F)	23.6 (74.5)	23.5 (74.3)	23.6 (74.5)	23.6 (74.5)	23.7 (74.7)	23.2 (73.8)	23.2 (73.8)	23.0 (73.4)	23.1 (73.6)	23.3 (73.9)	23.5 (74.3)	23.5 (74.3)	23.4 (74.1)
Average precipitation mm (inches)	281 (11.1)	265 (10.4)	339 (13.3)	256 (10.1)	284 (11.2)	345 (13.6)	544 (21.4)	433 (17.0)	341 (13.4)	317 (12.5)	269 (10.6)	226 (8.9)	3,900 (153.5)
Source: Climate-Data.org

== Notable Buin people ==
- John Momis

== See also ==
- Buin Rural LLG
- Bougainville Island
- Bougainville Campaign
- Solomon Islands campaign

== Gallery ==
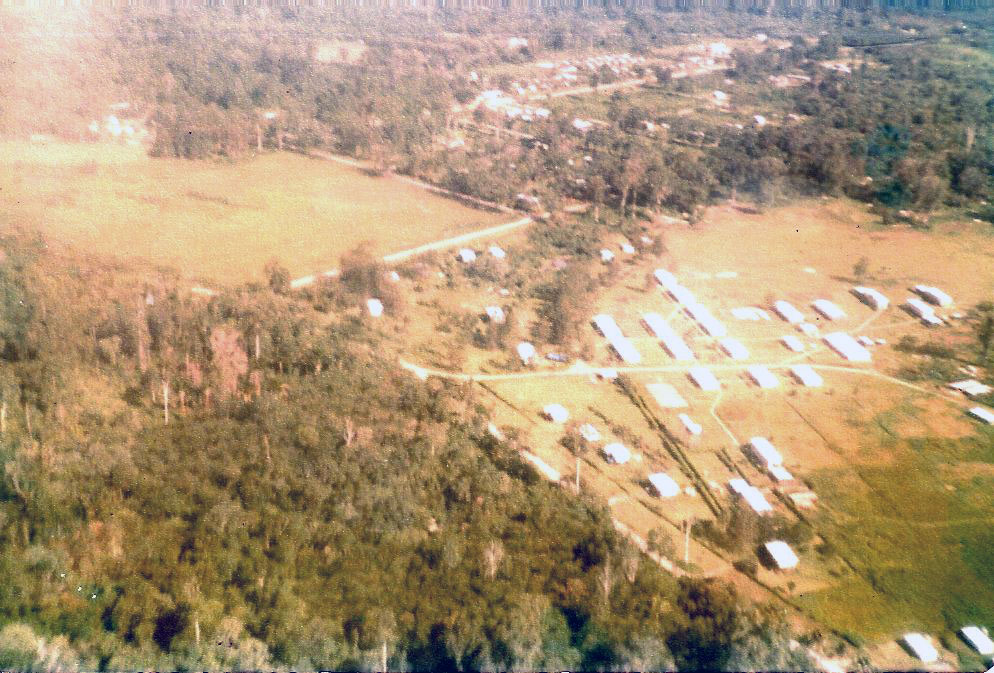
Buin High School from the air with the town beyond, February 1977

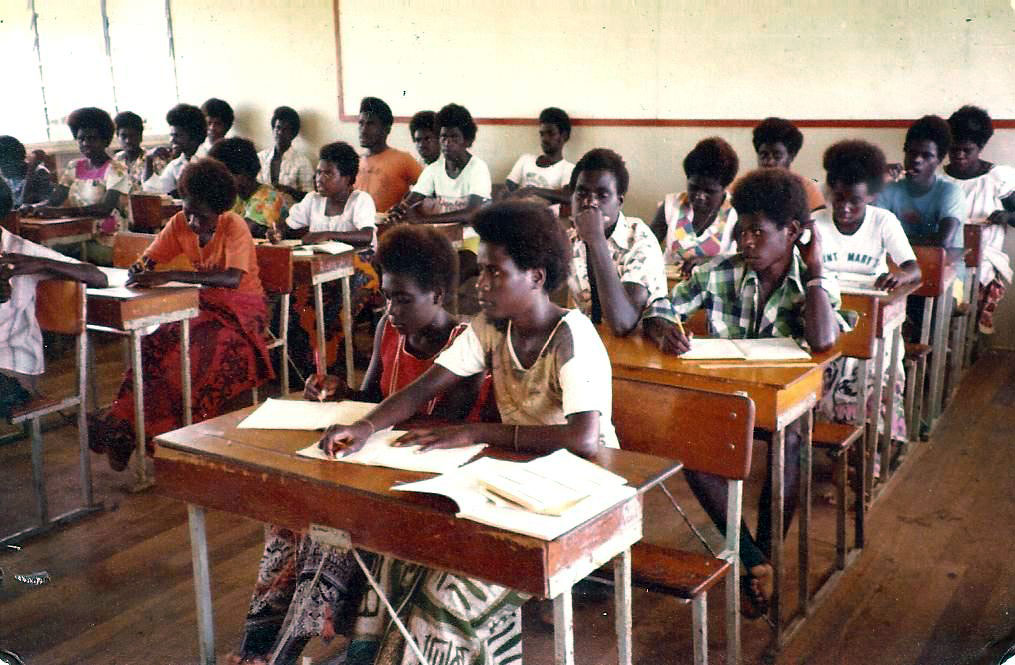
Buin High School students in class.

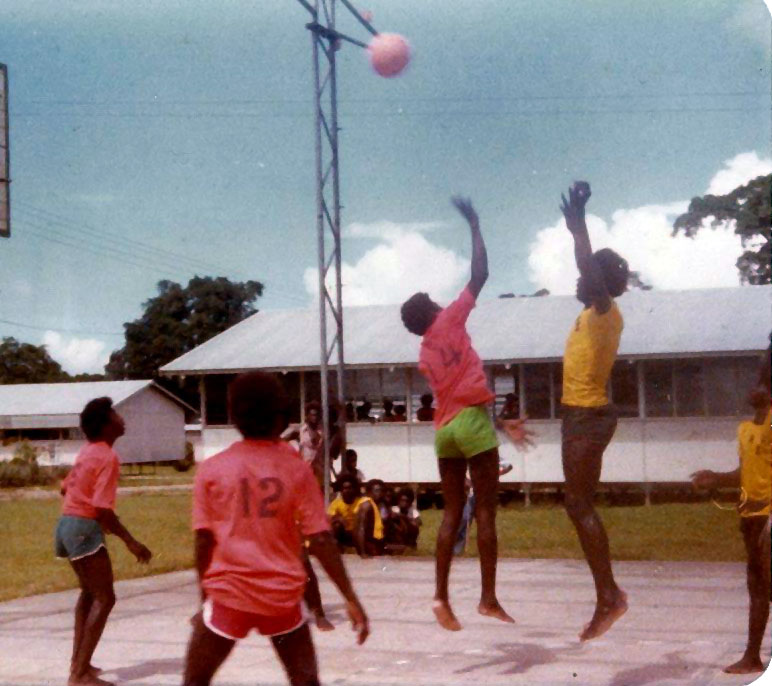
Buin High School students playing basket ball.

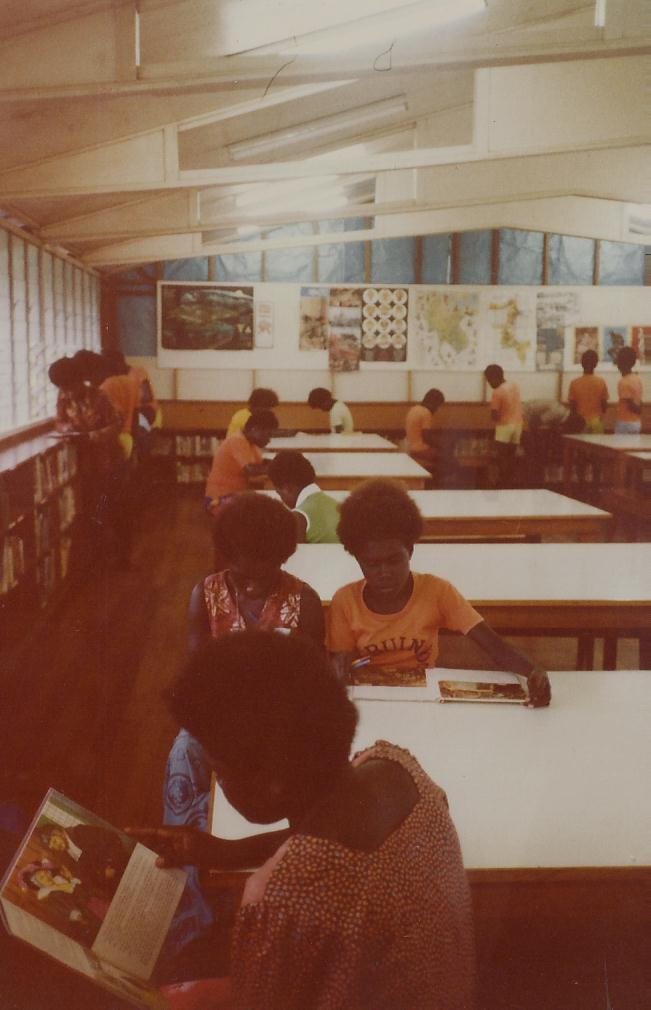
Buin High School library 1978 when graduates' admission to post-grade 10 education institutions was 95%

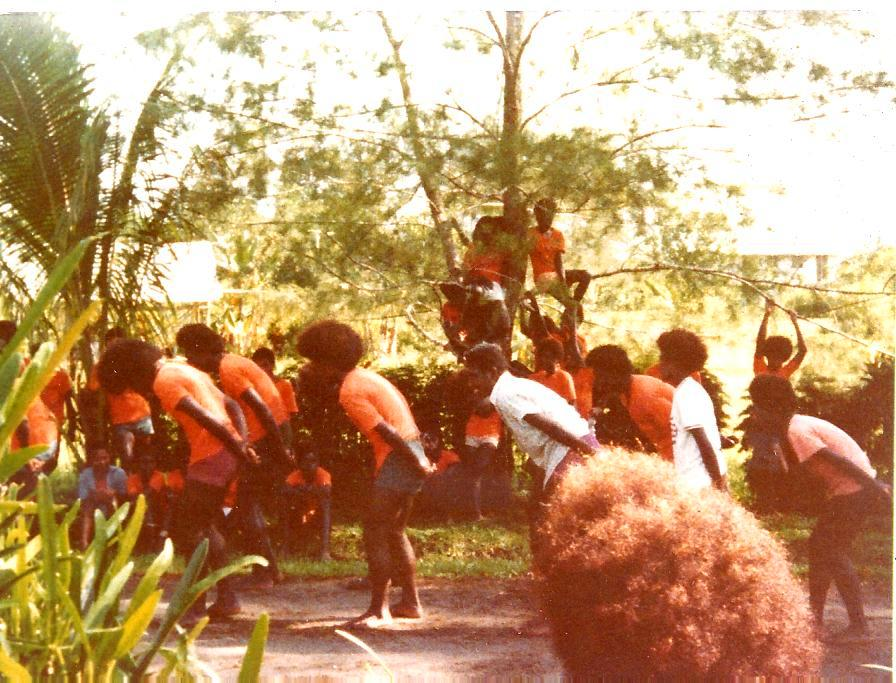
Buka students dancing at Buin High School, 1978 demonstrating amiable interaction among people

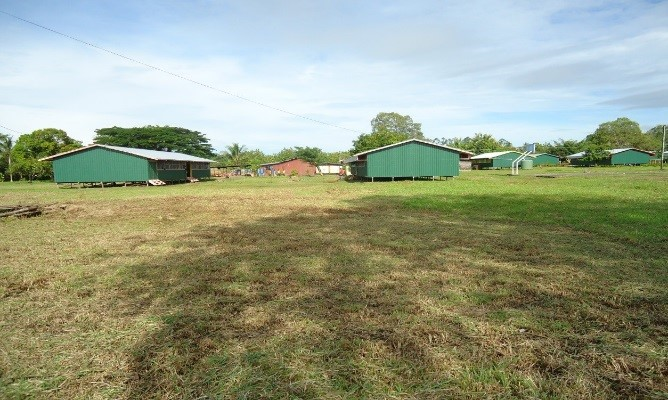
Buin High School classroom buildings having been restored in 2013
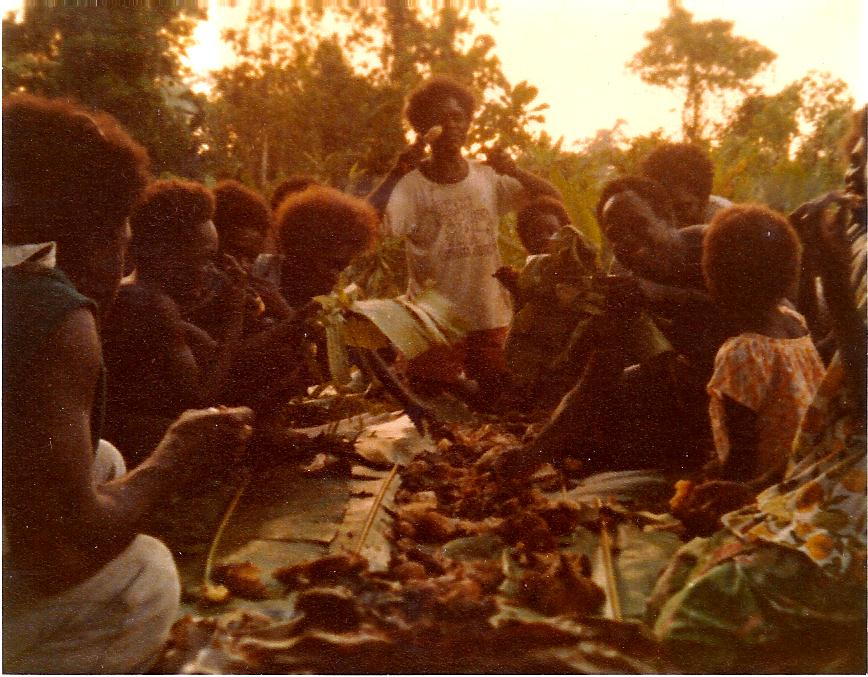
Christmas dinner near a south Bougainvillean village: turkey, but cooked in traditional style in the ground

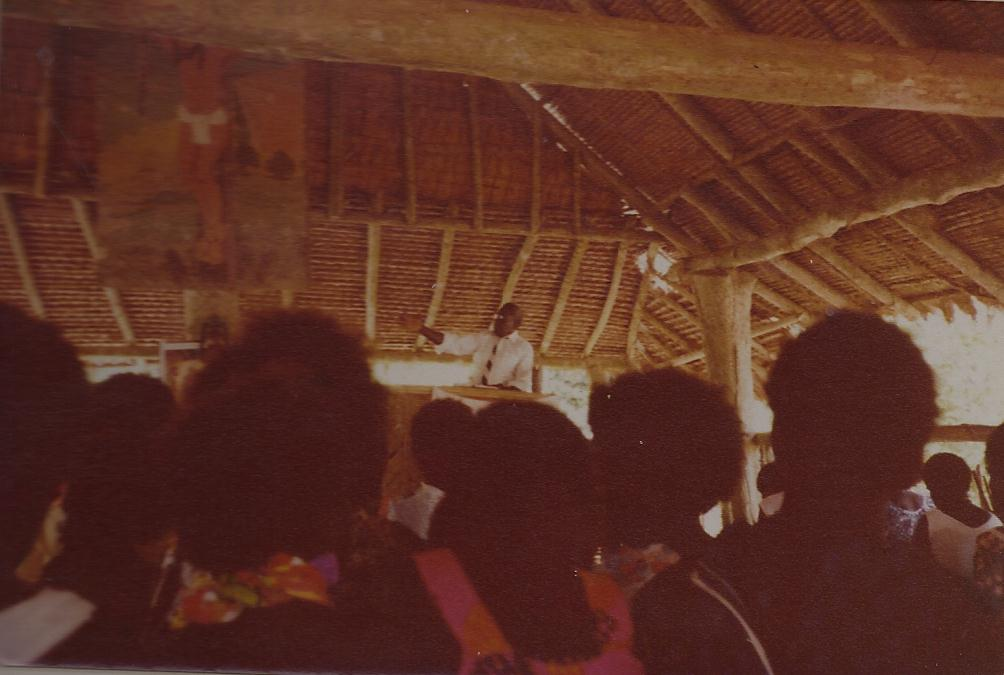
United Church village preacher

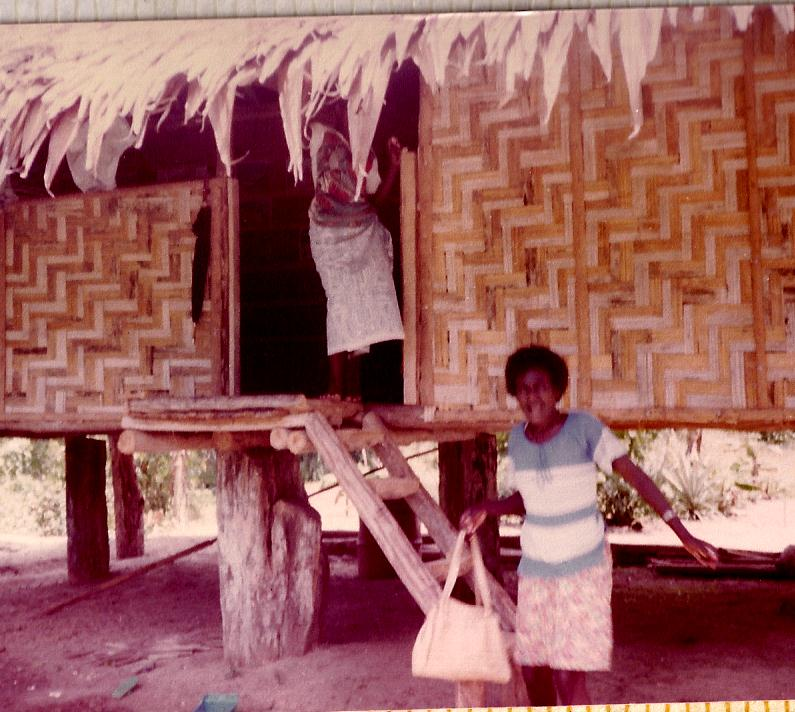
Female minister of the United Church

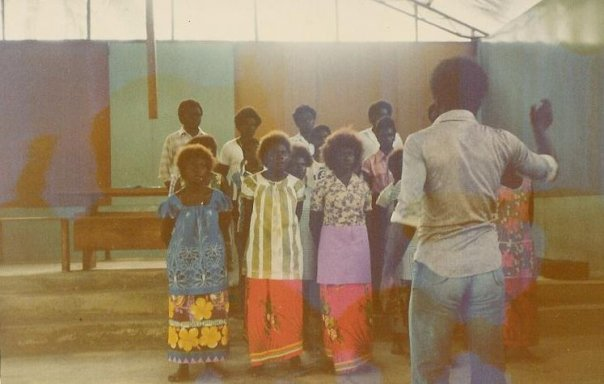
A village United Church congregation's choir

== Notes ==
=== References ===
- Long, Gavin (1963). The Final Campaigns. Australia in the War of 1939–1945, Series 1—Army. Volume VII (1st ed.). Canberra: Australian War Memorial. OCLC 1297619.
- Merriam Webster's New Geographical Dictionary, Third Edition. Springfield, Massachusetts: Merriam-Webster, Incorporated, 1997. ISBN 0-87779-546-0.
- Odgers, George (1988). Army Australia: An Illustrated History. Frenchs Forest: Child & Associates. ISBN 0-86777-061-9.
