= Pilot Point Airport =

Airport in Alaska, United States

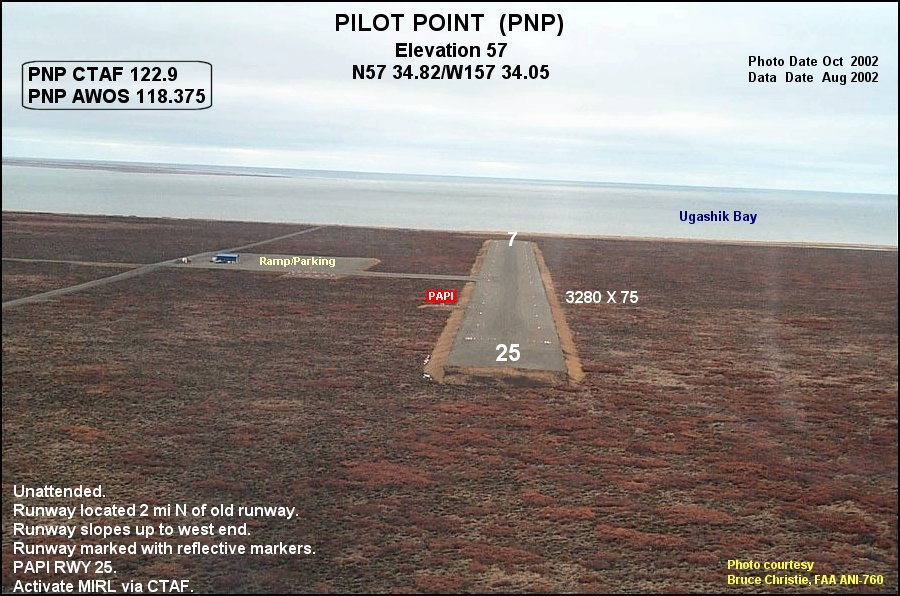
- View from east, looking west
- IATA: PIP; ICAO: PAPN; FAA LID: PNP

Summary
- Airport type: Public
- Owner: State of Alaska DOT&PF - Central Region
- Serves: Pilot Point, Alaska
- Elevation AMSL: 57 ft (17 m)
- Coordinates: 57°34′49″N 157°34′19″W

Map
- Location of airport in Alaska

Runways
Direction	Length		Surface
Direction	ft	m	Surface
7/25	3,280	1,000	Gravel

Statistics (2005)
- Aircraft operations: 5,300
- Enplanements (2008): 738
- Source: Federal Aviation Administration

Pilot Point Airport (IATA: PIP, ICAO: PAPN, FAA LID: PNP) is a state-owned, public-use airport located in Pilot Point, a city in the Lake and Peninsula Borough of the U.S. state of Alaska. Scheduled airline service to King Salmon Airport is provided by Grant Aviation.

As per Federal Aviation Administration records, this airport had 738 commercial passenger boardings (enplanements) in calendar year 2008, an increase of 9% from the 678 enplanements in 2007. Pilot Point Airport is included in the FAA's National Plan of Integrated Airport Systems (2009–2013), which categorizes it as a general aviation facility.

Although most U.S. airports use the same three-letter location identifier for the FAA and IATA, this airport is assigned PNP by the FAA and PIP by the IATA (which assigned PNP to Girua Airport in Popondetta, Papua New Guinea).

== Facilities and aircraft ==
Pilot Point Airport has one runway designated 7/25 with a gravel surface measuring 3,280 by 75 feet (1,000 x 23 m). The airport was previously located at 57°33.79′N 157°33.51′W where it had an 3,100-by-50-foot (945 m × 15 m) runway also designated 7/25.

For the 12-month period ending December 31, 2005, the airport had 5,300 aircraft operations, an average of 14 per day: 66% general aviation and 34% air taxi.

== Airlines and destinations ==
Airlines	Destinations
Grant Aviation	King Salmon, Port Heiden, Ugashik Bay

== Accidents and incidents ==
On 1 July 1981, Douglas R4D N111ST of United Aircraft Services crashed shortly after take-off while on a flight to Anchorage International Airport, following the failure of the port engine. All three people on board were killed. The aircraft was on a cargo flight laden with fish.

== See also ==
- List of airports in Alaska
