= Breeze =

Breeze often refers to:

- A gentle to moderate wind
- Sea breeze, an onshore afternoon wind, caused by warm air rising over the land in sunny weather

Breeze or The Breeze may also refer to:

== Places ==
- Breeze Center, a shopping center in Songshan District, Taipei, Taiwan
- Breeze Creek, a river in California
- Breeze Lake, a lake in California
- Breeze Nan Jing, shopping mall in Songshan District, Taipei, Taiwan
- Gulf Breeze, Florida, a city in Santa Rosa County

== People ==
- Breeze (rapper), American rapper
- Alan Breeze (1909–1980), English singer of the British dance band era
- Andrew Breeze (born 1954), British academic
- Ben Breeze (born 1974), English rugby union player
- Brady Breeze (born 1997), American football player
- Carl Breeze (born 1979), British auto racing driver
- Claude Breeze (born 1938), Canadian figurative painter
- David Breeze (born 1944), British archaeologist, teacher and scholar
- Ernest Breeze (1910–1984), English footballer
- Evan Breeze (1798–1855), Welsh poet and schoolmaster
- Gabriel Breeze (born 2003), English footballer
- Jared Breeze (born 2005), American child actor
- Jean "Binta" Breeze (1956–2021), Jamaican dub poet and storyteller
- Joe Breeze (born 1953), American bicycle framebuilder, designer and advocate
- Lynn Breeze, British illustrator and author.
- Maddie Breeze, British sociologist and lecturer
- Marc Breeze (born 1987), Welsh rugby union player
- Mark Breeze or DJ Breeze, British disc jockey
- Matthew Breeze (born 1972), Australian football referee
- Michaela Breeze (born 1979), British weightlifter
- Roger Breeze (1946–2016), English veterinary scientist
- Samuel Breeze (1772–1812), Welsh Baptist minister
- Tyler Breeze (born 1988), Canadian pro wrestler
- William Breeze (born 1955), American author and publisher on magick and philosophy

== Arts, entertainment, and media ==
=== Music ===
- "Breeze", a song by Megumi Hayashibara released with "Don't Be Discouraged"
- Breezin', an album by George Benson
- Breezing (album), an album by Sonny Red
- The Breeze: An Appreciation of JJ Cale, an album by Eric Clapton

=== Press and publishing ===
- Breeze Publications, publisher based in Lincoln, Rhode Island
- Daily Breeze, daily newspaper published in Hermosa Beach, California, United States
- The Breeze (newspaper), the official student newspaper of James Madison University in Harrisonburg, Virginia

=== Radio ===
- In Australia
  - The Breeze (Australia), a radio network broadcasting to remote Queensland and New South Wales, Australia
  - Macquarie Sports Radio 1278, in Melbourne, former branding from 1992 to 1993
- In Canada
  - CHLG-FM, in Vancouver, British Columbia
  - CKRA-FM, in Edmonton, Alberta
  - CKUL-FM, in Halifax, Nova Scotia
- In England
  - The Breeze (radio network), a small network of radio stations operating in South and South West England
  - The Breeze (radio station), a pair of former radio stations in southern England
- In New Zealand
  - The Breeze (New Zealand radio station), a radio station in New Zealand
- In the United States
  - The Breeze, an iHeartRadio music service
  - KBEB, in Sacramento
  - KISQ, in San Francisco
  - WCON (AM), in Cornelia, Georgia
  - WGXI, in Plymouth, Wisconsin
  - WPBZ-FM, in Rensaller, New York
  - WTSS, in Buffalo from 2018 to 2023
  - WWZY, in Long Branch, New Jersey, former branding from 2003 to 2013
  - WXXF, in Loudonville, Ohio

=== Television ===
- Breeze TV, a New Zealand music TV channel that was launched by The Breeze radio station
- Granada Breeze, a defunct British television channel

== Brands and enterprises ==
- Breeze, a brand of mobile phones marketed by Pantech
- Breeze Airways, an airline in the United States that began operating in 2021
- Breeze detergent
- Breeze Energy, a UK-based retail electricity and gas supplier specialising in sustainable energy

== Software ==
- Breeze (app), a mobile app for online dating
- Breeze, a mobile banking application on the iPhone developed by Standard Chartered Bank
- Macromedia Breeze, a former name of Adobe Acrobat Connect presentation software

== Transport ==
- Breeze (ship)
- Breeze Airways
- Breeze Card, a smart card used in Atlanta, Georgia
- Carnival Breeze, a cruise ship
- Plymouth Breeze, a car model
- Solar Wings Breeze, a hang glider model
- The Breeze, a former nickname of the catamaran ferry HSC Virgen de Coromoto
- The Breeze, a bus service of the Cape Cod Regional Transit Authority
- BREEZE, a bus service managed by North County Transit District

== Other uses ==
- Breeze BC, a basketball team based in Miami, Florida
- Breeze block, a concrete masonry unit made from recovered fly-ash
- Horse-fly, various strong-bodied dipterous insects of the family Tabanidae
- DC Breeze, an open professional ultimate team based in the District of Columbia

== See also ==
- Breezy (disambiguation)
- Brees (surname), includes a list of people with the name
