= Breese (surname) =

Breese is a surname. Notable people with the surname include:

- Charles Breese (RAF officer) (1889–1941), English naval and air force officer
- Charles Breese (1867–1932), Welsh solicitor, antiquarian and politician
- Chic Breese (1872–1929), Australian rules footballer
- Dave Breese (1926–2002), American evangelist
- Dilys Breese (1932–2007), English television producer
- Edward Y. Breese (1912–1979), American writer
- Gareth Breese (born 1976), Jamaican cricketer
- Kidder Breese (1831–1881), American naval officer
- Llywelyn Breese (fl. 1870s), American politician
- Quentin Breese (1918–1962), American boxer
- Samuel Livingston Breese (1794–1870), American rear-admiral
- Sidney Breese (1800–1878), American politician and lawyer
- Thomas Breese (1793–1846), American naval officer
- Tom Breese (born 1991), English mixed martial artist
- Vance Breese (1904–1973), American aviation engineer and test pilot

== See also ==
- Brees (surname)
