= Breese =

Breese may refer to:

== People ==
- Breese (surname), a list of people
- Breese J. Stevens (1834–1903), American politician and lawyer

== Places ==
- Breese, Germany, a municipality
- Breese, Illinois, United States, a city
- Breese Township, Clinton County, Illinois

== Other uses ==
- USS Breese, a United States Navy destroyer
- M-Squared Breese, an ultralight aircraft

== See also ==
- Breeze (disambiguation)
