= Edward Buller =

Edward Buller may refer to:

- Sir Edward Buller, 1st Baronet (1764–1824), politician and vice-admiral in the Royal Navy
- Sir Edward Manningham-Buller, 1st Baronet (1800–1882), politician
- Ed Buller, British record producer and musician
- Edward Buller, pen-name of popular fiction writer Edward Y. Breese (1912–1979)

== See also ==
- Buller (surname)
