= Breezy Point =

Breezy Point can refer to a community in the United States:

- Breezy Point, Minnesota, a city in Crow Wing County
- Breezy Point, Queens, New York, a neighborhood on the Rockaway Peninsula

== See also ==
- Point Breeze (disambiguation)
- Breezy (disambiguation)
