= Breeze Song Gao =

Shopping mall in Xinyi, Taipei, Taiwan

- 微風松高
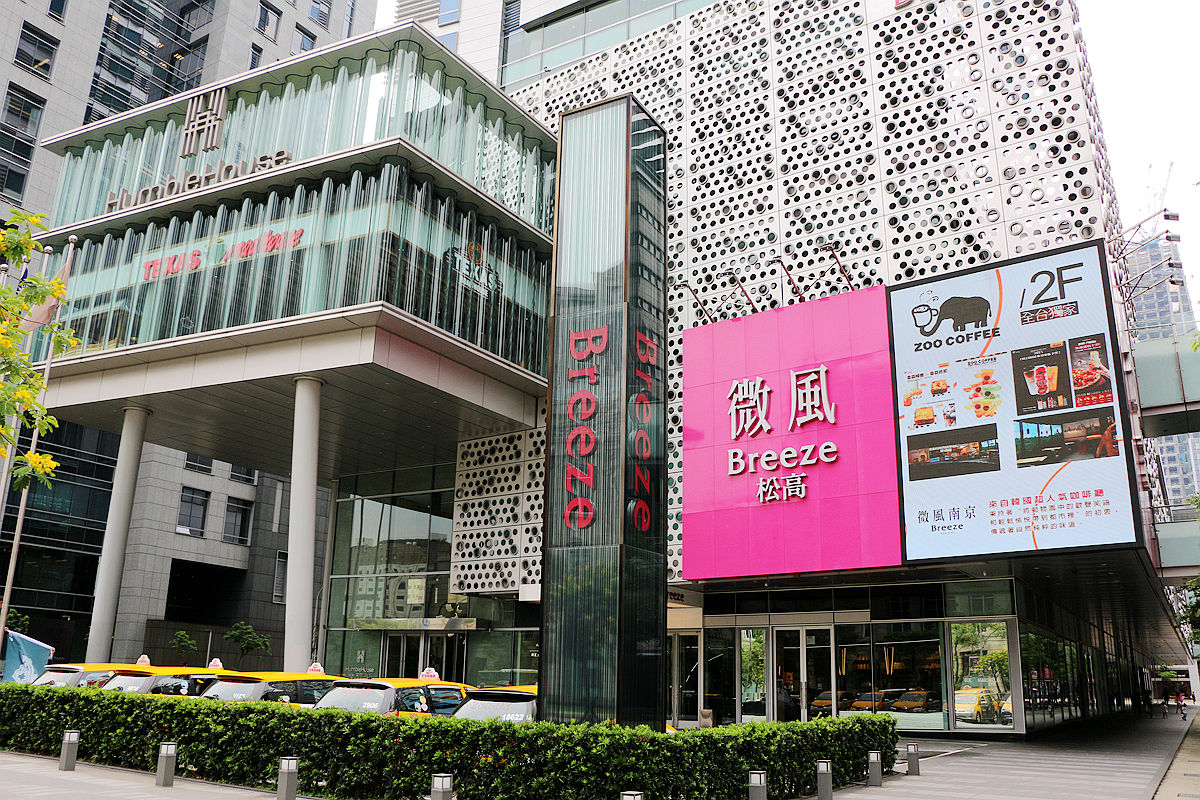
- Location: No. 16, Songgao Road, Xinyi, Taipei, Taiwan
- Coordinates: 25.03881149805675°N 121.56733386872126°E
- Opened: 24 October 2014
- Manager: Breeze Center
- Floors: 4 floors above ground 2 floors below ground
- Public transit: Taipei City Hall metro station
- Website: www.breezecenter.com

Breeze Song Gao (Chinese: 微風松高) is a shopping mall in Xinyi District, Taipei, Taiwan that opened on 24 October 2014. Located within walking distance of Taipei City Hall metro station, Breeze Song Gao has a total floor area of 12,540 m^{2} (135,000 sq ft), with business floors ranging from four floors above ground to two floors below ground. Its target customer group is young people aged 16 to 30. There are 126 stores in the mall, with the first H&M store introduced in Taiwan. In 2019, the first Kura Sushi store in Xinyi District was introduced.

== History ==
The original location is the Xinyi store planned to be opened by Momo department store, which is in the same building as the Humble House Taipei. In August 2013, the Fubon Group resold the management rights of the mall to Breeze Group due to the poor investment of Momo department store Xinyi store, and Breeze took over the lease of Fubon Life A10.

== Gallery ==
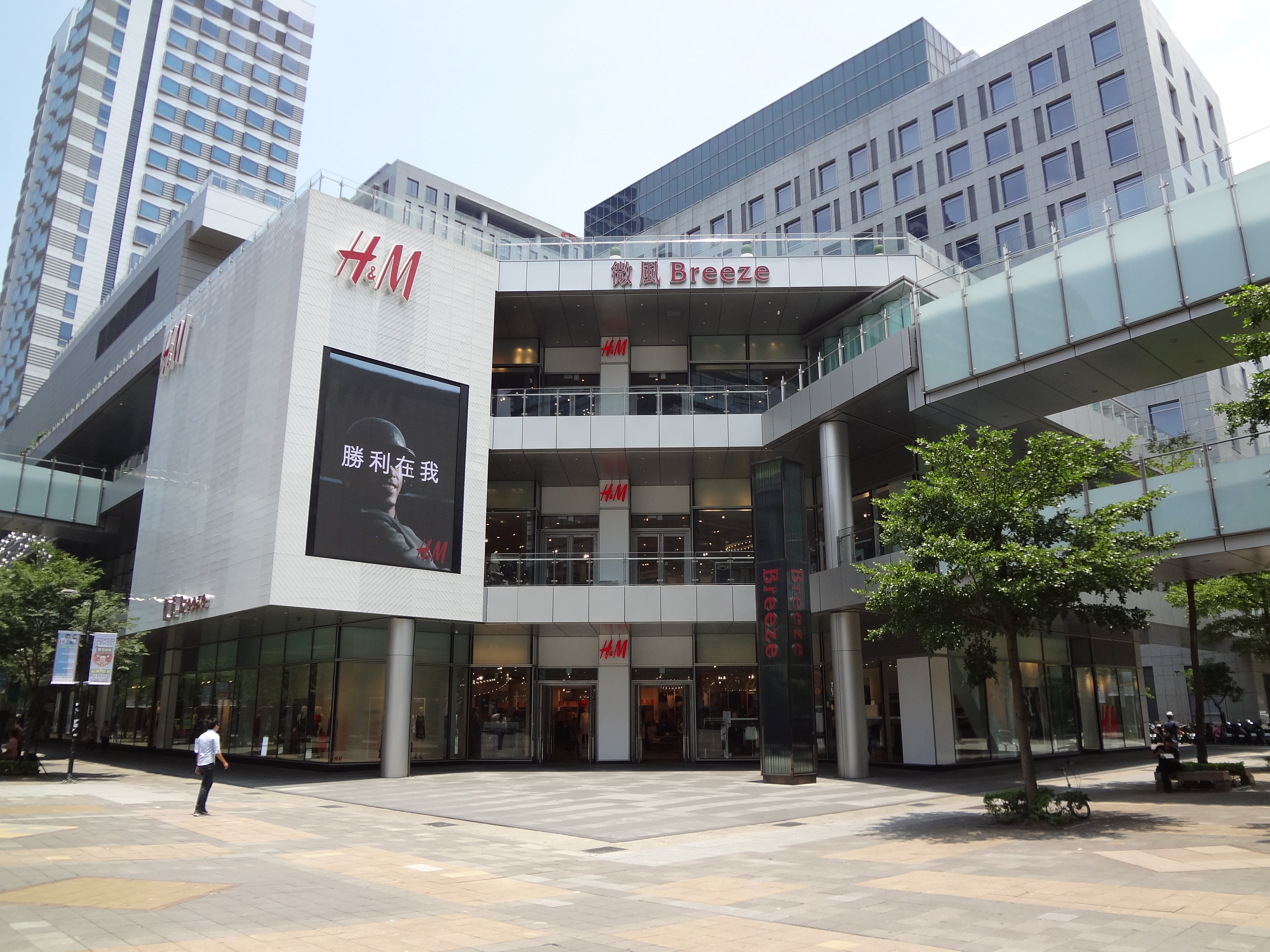
Exterior

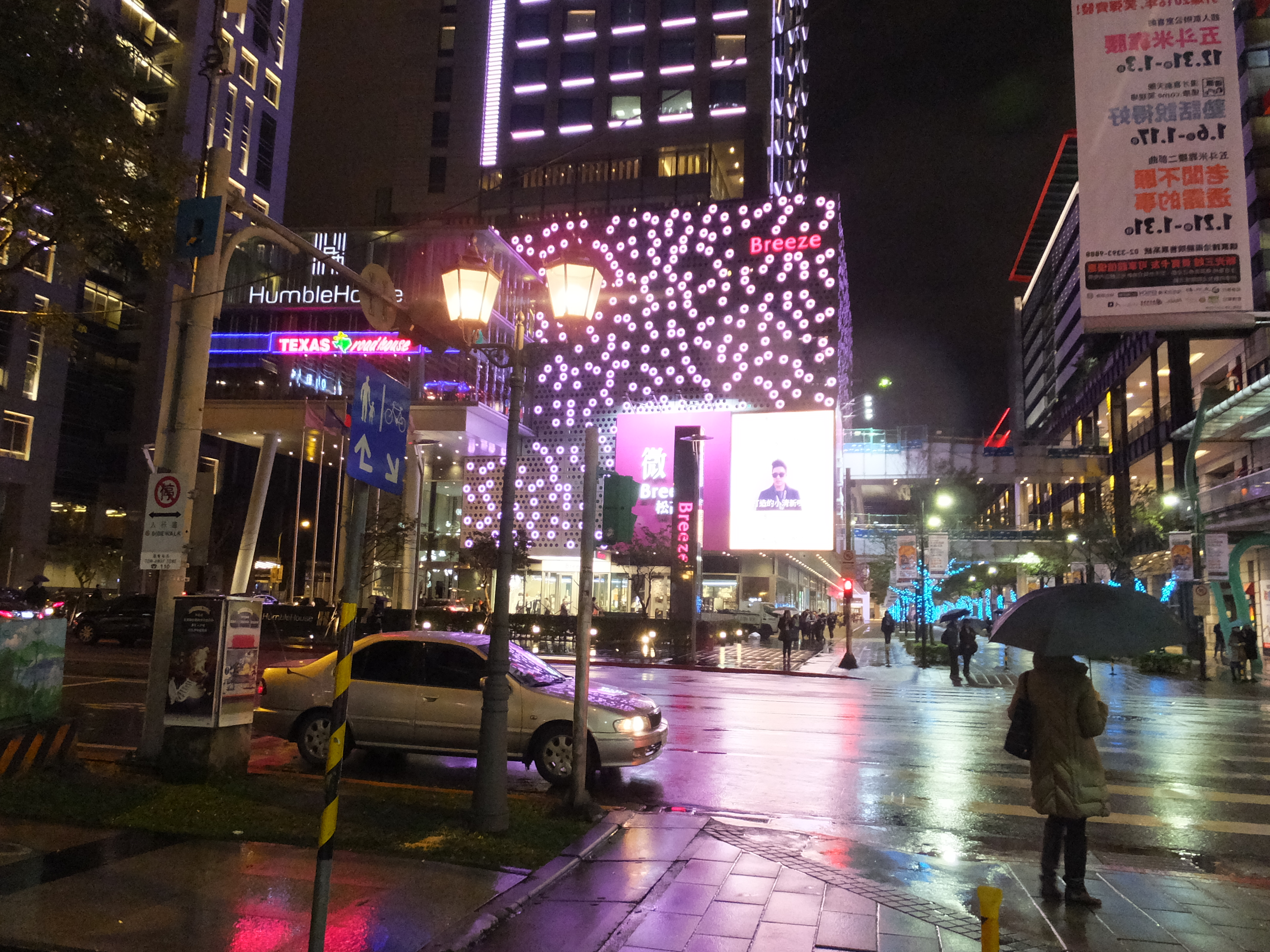
At night

== See also ==
- List of tourist attractions in Taiwan
- List of shopping malls in Taipei
- Breeze Center
- Breeze Nan Jing
