= 2003–04 Heineken Cup pool stage =

- Season: 2003–04 Heineken Cup
- Date: 5 December 2003 – 1 February 2004

Qualifiers
- Seed 1: (France) Toulouse
- Seed 2: (England) London Wasps
- Seed 3: (Ireland) Munster
- Seed 4: (Wales) Llanelli Scarlets
- Seed 5: (France) Biarritz Olympique
- Seed 6: (France) Stade Français
- Seed 7: (England) Gloucester
- Seed 8: (Scotland) Edinburgh

The pool stage of the 2003–04 Heineken Cup.

== Pool 1 ==
Team	P	W	D	L	Tries for	Tries against	Try diff	Points for	Points against	Points diff	TB	LB	Pts
(France) Stade Français	6	4	0	2	11	8	3	134	80	54	1	1	18
(England) Leicester Tigers	6	3	0	3	17	10	7	137	115	22	3	0	15
(Ireland) Ulster	6	3	0	3	10	9	1	109	106	3	1	1	14
(Wales) Newport Gwent Dragons	6	2	0	4	5	16	−11	67	146	−79	0	1	9

5 December 2003
16:00

Stade Français (France)	26–15	(England) Leicester Tigers

Stade Jean-Bouin
Attendance: 11,848

7 December 2003
14:30

Newport Gwent Dragons (Wales)	24–15	(Ireland) Ulster
Try: Breeze; Montgomery; Con: Jarvis	Report	Pen: Humphreys (5)

Rodney Parade
Attendance: 5,500

12 December 2003
19:30

Ulster (Ireland)	22–20	(France) Stade Français
Try: Wallace; Con: Humphreys; Pen: Humphreys (5)	Report	Try: Rabadan; Pen: Domínguez (4); Drop: Liebenburg

Ravenhill
Attendance: 10,243

14 December 2003
15:00

Leicester Tigers (England)	34–3	(Wales) Newport Gwent Dragons

Welford Road
Attendance: 15,093

10 January 2004
14:30

Newport Gwent Dragons (Wales)	20–12	(France) Stade Français

Rodney Parade
Attendance: 5,782

11 January 2004
13:00

Ulster (Ireland)	33–0	(England) Leicester Tigers
Try: Howe; Ward (2); Stewart; Con: Humphreys (2); Pen: Humphreys (3)	Report

Ravenhill
Attendance: 12,300

17 January 2004
15:00

Leicester Tigers (England)	49–7	(Ireland) Ulster
Try: Lloyd (2); Back; Van der Westhuyzen; Johnson; Con: Vesty (3); Pen: Vesty (6)	Report	Try: Topping; Con: Humphreys

Welford Road
Attendance: 16,815

18 January 2004
15:00

Stade Français (France)	37–0	(Wales) Newport Gwent Dragons

Stade Jean-Bouin
Attendance: 8,888

24 January 2004
16:00

Stade Français (France)	13–10	(Ireland) Ulster
Try: Marconnet; Con: Domínguez; Pen: Domínguez (2)	Report	Try: Humphreys; Con: Humphreys; Pen: Humphreys

Stade Jean-Bouin
Attendance: 10,284

24 January 2004
17:00

Newport Gwent Dragons (Wales)	20–26	(England) Leicester Tigers

Rodney Parade
Attendance: 8,319

30 January 2004
19:45

Leicester Tigers (England)	13–26	(France) Stade Français

Welford Road
Attendance: 16,815

30 January 2004
19:45

Ulster (Ireland)	22–0	(Wales) Newport Gwent Dragons
Try: Shields; Humphreys; Howe; Con: Humphreys (2); Pen: Humphreys

Ravenhill
Attendance: 11,925

== Pool 2 ==
Team	P	W	D	L	Tries for	Tries against	Try diff	Points for	Points against	Points diff	TB	LB	Pts
(France) Toulouse	6	5	0	1	18	7	11	157	65	92	4	1	25
(Scotland) Edinburgh	6	5	0	1	14	7	7	130	89	41	2	0	22
(England) Leeds Tykes	6	1	0	5	5	11	−6	66	122	−56	0	1	5
(Wales) Neath-Swansea Ospreys	6	1	0	5	6	18	−12	78	155	−77	0	0	4

7 December 2003
13:00

Edinburgh (Scotland)	23–16	(France) Toulouse

Meadowbank Stadium
Attendance: 3,520

7 December 2003
14:30

Leeds Tykes (England)	29–20	(Wales) Neath Swansea Ospreys

Headingley Stadium
Attendance: 3,755

12 December 2003
19:30

Neath Swansea Ospreys (Wales)	16–32	(Scotland) Edinburgh

St Helen's
Attendance: 1,822

12 December 2003
19:30

Toulouse (France)	19–3	(England) Leeds Tykes

Stade Ernest Wallon
Attendance: 12,500

9 January 2004
19:30

Edinburgh (Scotland)	19–9	(England) Leeds Tykes

Meadowbank Stadium
Attendance: 5,056

10 January 2004
16:00

Toulouse (France)	29–6	(Wales) Neath Swansea Ospreys

Stade Ernest Wallon
Attendance: 11,600

16 January 2004
19:45

Neath Swansea Ospreys (Wales)	11–29	(France) Toulouse

The Gnoll
Attendance: 4,378

18 January 2004
13:00

Leeds Tykes (England)	0–23	(Scotland) Edinburgh

Headingley Stadium
Attendance: 3,354

23 January 2004
19:30

Edinburgh (Scotland)	33–15	(Wales) Neath Swansea Ospreys

Meadowbank Stadium
Attendance: 4,820

25 January 2004
13:00

Leeds Tykes (England)	22–31	(France) Toulouse

Headingley Stadium
Attendance: 4,352

31 January 2004
15:00

Neath Swansea Ospreys (Wales)	10–3	(England) Leeds Tykes

St Helen's
Attendance: 3,312

31 January 2004
16:00

Toulouse (France)	33–0	(Scotland) Edinburgh

Stade Ernest Wallon
Attendance: 18,184

== Pool 3 ==
Team	P	W	D	L	Tries for	Tries against	Try diff	Points for	Points against	Points diff	TB	LB	Pts
(France) Biarritz Olympique	6	4	0	2	18	12	6	139	97	42	3	1	20
(Ireland) Leinster	6	4	0	2	13	11	2	142	113	29	1	1	18
(Wales) Cardiff Blues	6	2	0	4	13	13	0	123	132	−9	0	3	11
(England) Sale Sharks	6	2	0	4	6	14	−8	75	137	−62	0	1	9

6 December 2003
15:00

Leinster (Ireland)	32–6	(France) Biarritz

Lansdowne Road
Attendance: 7,200

6 December 2003
17:00

Sale Sharks (England)	26–24	(Wales) Cardiff Blues

Edgeley Park
Attendance: 10,541

12 December 2003
19:45

Cardiff Blues (Wales)	19–24	(Ireland) Leinster

Cardiff Arms Park
Attendance: 5,000

13 December 2003
18:30

Biarritz (France)	31–3	(England) Sale Sharks

Parc des Sports Aquil
Attendance: 7,000

9 January 2004
19:45

Leinster (Ireland)	22–23	(England) Sale Sharks

Lansdowne Road
Attendance: 14,200

10 January 2004
18:00

Biarritz (France)	35–20	(Wales) Cardiff Blues

Parc des Sports Aquil
Attendance: 5,321

17 January 2004
14:30

Cardiff Blues (Wales)	21–20	(France) Biarritz

Cardiff Arms Park
Attendance: 4,974

18 January 2004
15:00

Sale Sharks (England)	16–23	(Ireland) Leinster

Edgeley Park
Attendance: 10,417

23 January 2004
19:45

Leinster (Ireland)	20–17	(Wales) Cardiff Blues

Lansdowne Road
Attendance: 23,463

25 January 2004
15:00

Sale Sharks (England)	0–15	(France) Biarritz

Edgeley Park
Attendance: 6,421

31 January 2004
15:00

Cardiff Blues (Wales)	22–7	(England) Sale Sharks

Cardiff Arms Park
Attendance: 5,242

31 January 2004
16:00

Biarritz (France)	32–21	(Ireland) Leinster

Parc des Sports Aquil
Attendance: 8,500

== Pool 4 ==
Team	P	W	D	L	Tries for	Tries against	Try diff	Points for	Points against	Points diff	TB	LB	Pts
(Wales) Llanelli Scarlets	6	5	0	1	17	5	12	160	72	88	2	1	23
(England) Northampton Saints	6	4	0	2	13	4	9	121	54	67	1	1	18
(France) Agen	6	2	0	4	8	7	1	83	94	−11	1	2	11
(Scotland) The Borders	6	1	0	5	4	26	−22	39	183	−144	0	0	4

5 December 2003
19:45

Llanelli Scarlets (Wales)	14–9	(England) Northampton Saints

Stradey Park
Attendance: 9,128

6 December 2003
19:30

Agen (France)	27–8	(Scotland) Borders

Stade Armandie
Attendance: 7,000

13 December 2003
15:00

Northampton Saints (England)	25–10	(France) Agen

Franklin's Gardens
Attendance: 11,523

14 December 2003
13:00

Borders (Scotland)	10–41	(Wales) Llanelli Scarlets

Netherdale
Attendance: 3,250

9 January 2004
19:30

Llanelli Scarlets (Wales)	19–15	(France) Agen

Stradey Park
Attendance: 9,438

10 January 2004
15:00

Northampton Saints (England)	20–3	(Scotland) Borders

Franklin's Gardens
Attendance: 11,713

16 January 2004
19:30

Borders (Scotland)	3–39	(England) Northampton Saints

Netherdale
Attendance: 3,420

17 January 2004
16:00

Agen (France)	22–15	(Wales) Llanelli Scarlets

Stade Armandie
Attendance: 7,000

23 January 2004
20:00

Agen (France)	6–19	(England) Northampton Saints

Stade Armandie
Attendance: 8,000

24 January 2004
15:00

Llanelli Scarlets (Wales)	53–7	(Scotland) Borders

Stradey Park
Attendance: 7,393

1 February 2004
15:00

Northampton Saints (England)	9–18	(Wales) Llanelli Scarlets

Franklin's Gardens
Attendance: 12,031

1 February 2004
15:00

Borders (Scotland)	8–3	(France) Agen

Netherdale
Attendance: 1,325

== Pool 5 ==
Team	P	W	D	L	Tries for	Tries against	Try diff	Points for	Points against	Points diff	TB	LB	Pts
(Ireland) Munster Rugby	6	5	0	1	22	5	17	172	76	96	4	0	24
(England) Gloucester	6	5	0	1	22	11	11	197	100	97	4	0	24
(France) Bourgoin	6	1	0	5	13	22	−9	119	191	−72	2	1	7
(Italy) Benetton Treviso	6	1	0	5	13	32	−19	104	225	−121	1	0	5

6 December 2003
14:30

Benetton Treviso (Italy)	12–33	(England) Gloucester

Stadio Comunale di Monigo
Attendance: 3,500

6 December 2003
18:00

Bourgoin (France)	17–18	(Ireland) Munster

Stade Pierre Rajon
Attendance: 9,200

13 December 2003
15:00

Gloucester (England)	49–13	(France) Bourgoin

Kingsholm
Attendance: 9,492

13 December 2003
17:00

Munster (Ireland)	51–0	(Italy) Benetton Treviso

Thomond Park
Attendance: 9,000

10 January 2004
14:30

Benetton Treviso (Italy)	42–33	(France) Bourgoin

Stadio Comunale di Monigo
Attendance: 3,320

10 January 2004
17:00

Gloucester (England)	22–11	(Ireland) Munster

Kingsholm
Attendance: 11,000

17 January 2004
17:00

Munster (Ireland)	35–14	(England) Gloucester

Thomond Park
Attendance: 13,500

18 January 2004
15:00

Bourgoin (France)	35–19	(Italy) Benetton Treviso

Stade Pierre Rajon
Attendance: 4,350

24 January 2004
14:30

Benetton Treviso (Italy)	20–31	(Ireland) Munster

Stadio Comunale di Monigo
Attendance: 5,500

21 January 2004
19:30

Bourgoin (France)	18–37	(England) Gloucester

Stade Pierre Rajon
Attendance: 6,500

31 January 2004
17:00

Gloucester (England)	42–11	(Italy) Benetton Treviso

Kingsholm
Attendance: 10,176

31 January 2004
17:00

Munster (Ireland)	26–3	(France) Bourgoin

Thomond Park
Attendance: 14,000

== Pool 6 ==
Team	P	W	D	L	Tries for	Tries against	Try diff	Points for	Points against	Points diff	TB	LB	Pts
(England) London Wasps	6	5	0	1	22	8	14	186	85	101	3	1	24
(Wales) Celtic Warriors	6	4	0	2	11	10	1	123	118	5	2	2	20
(France) Perpignan	6	3	0	3	13	11	2	119	115	4	2	1	15
(Italy) Ghial Rugby Calvisano	6	0	0	6	13	30	−17	115	225	−110	1	2	3

5 December 2003
19:15

Celtic Warriors (Wales)	34–25	(Italy) Calvisano

Brewery Field
Attendance: 2,500

7 December 2003
15:00

London Wasps (England)	28–7	(France) Perpignan

Adams Park
Attendance: 8,133

13 December 2003
14:30

Calvisano (Italy)	33–52	(England) London Wasps

Centro Sportivo San Michele
Attendance: 2,500

13 December 2003
16:00

Perpignan (France)	26–19	(Wales) Celtic Warriors

Stade Aime Giral
Attendance: 8,862

10 January 2004
19:00

Perpignan (France)	48–7	(Italy) Calvisano

Stade Aime Giral
Attendance: 9,174

11 January 2004
15:00

London Wasps (England)	9–14	(Wales) Celtic Warriors

Adams Park
Attendance: 7,502

16 January 2004
19:15

Celtic Warriors (Wales)	12–17	(England) London Wasps

Brewery Field
Attendance: 10,000

17 January 2004
14:30

Calvisano (Italy)	11–17	(France) Perpignan

Centro Sportivo San Michele
Attendance: 2,700

23 January 2004
19:15

Celtic Warriors (Wales)	16–15	(France) Perpignan

Brewery Field
Attendance: 6,500

25 January 2004
15:00

London Wasps (England)	46–13	(Italy) Calvisano

Adams Park
Attendance: 8,402

1 February 2004
14:00

Calvisano (Italy)	26–28	(Wales) Celtic Warriors

Centro Sportivo San Michele
Attendance: 2,300

1 February 2004
14:00

Perpignan (France)	6–34	(England) London Wasps

Stade Aime Giral
Attendance: 13,400

== Seeding and runners-up ==
Seed	Pool Winners	Pts	TF	+/-
1	(France) Toulouse	25	18	+92
2	(England) London Wasps	24	22	+101
3	(Ireland) Munster	24	22	+97
4	(Wales) Llanelli Scarlets	23	17	+88
5	(France) Biarritz Olympique	20	18	+42
6	(France) Stade Français	18	11	+54
Seed	Pool Runners-up	Pts	TF	+/-
7	(England) Gloucester	24	22	+96
8	(Scotland) Edinburgh	22	14	+41
–	(Wales) Celtic Warriors	20	11	+5
–	(England) Northampton Saints	18	13	+67
–	(Ireland) Leinster	18	13	+29
–	(England) Leicester Tigers	15	17	+22

== See also ==
- 2003-04 Heineken Cup
