= Point Breeze =

Point Breeze may refer to:

- Point Breeze, Philadelphia, Pennsylvania
- Point Breeze, Pittsburgh, Pennsylvania
- Point Breeze, the New Jersey estate of Joseph Bonaparte
- Point Breeze, an unincorporated community in Kingwood Township, New Jersey
- Point Breeze, the mouth of the Oak Orchard River in New York

== See also ==
- Breezy Point (disambiguation)
