= Breeze Nan Jing =

Shopping mall in Songshan, Taipei, Taiwan

- 微風南京
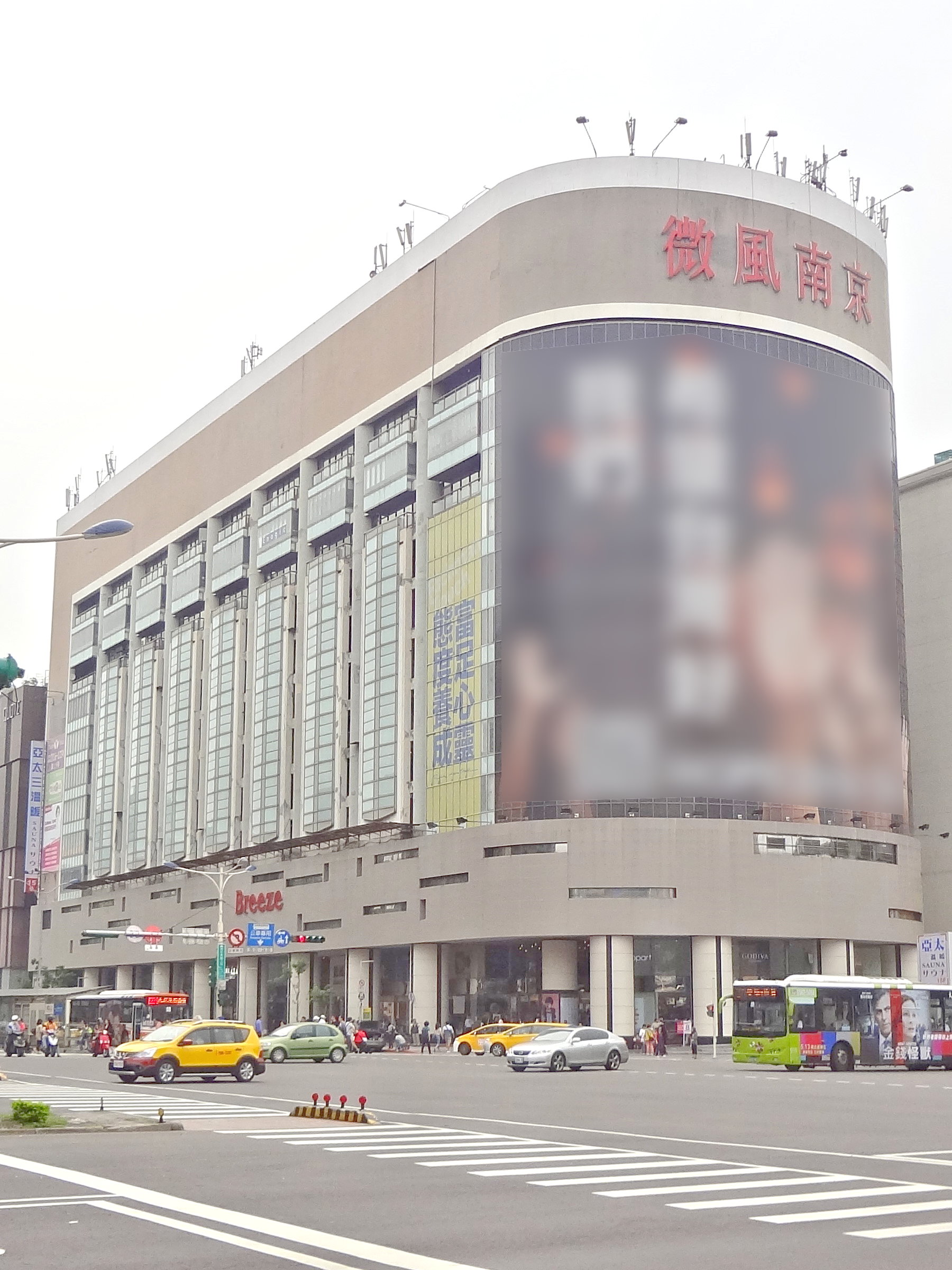
- Location: No. 337, Section 3, Jingdong 3rd Road, Songshan, Taipei, Taiwan
- Coordinates: 25°03′07″N 121°32′53″E
- Opened: September 1, 2013
- Manager: Breeze Center
- Architect: Chu-Yuan Lee
- Floors: 15 floors above ground 2 floors below ground
- Public transit: Taipei 101–World Trade Center metro station
- Website: www.breezecenter.com

Breeze Nan Jing (Chinese: 微風南京) is a shopping mall in Songshan District, Taipei, Taiwan that opened on September 1, 2013. It was first opened in 1983 and previously known as Asiaworld Shopping Mall. Core stores of the mall include Muji, Starbucks, and Uniqlo.

== History ==
- The building of the mall was designed by Chu-Yuan Lee and construction began in December 1978.
- The mall officially opened in January 1983 and was named Asiaworld Shopping Mall.
- In January 2010, the mall was renamed to Momo Mall.
- On September 1, 2013, the mall was renamed again to Breeze Nan Jing, and was operated by Breeze Center.

== Gallery ==
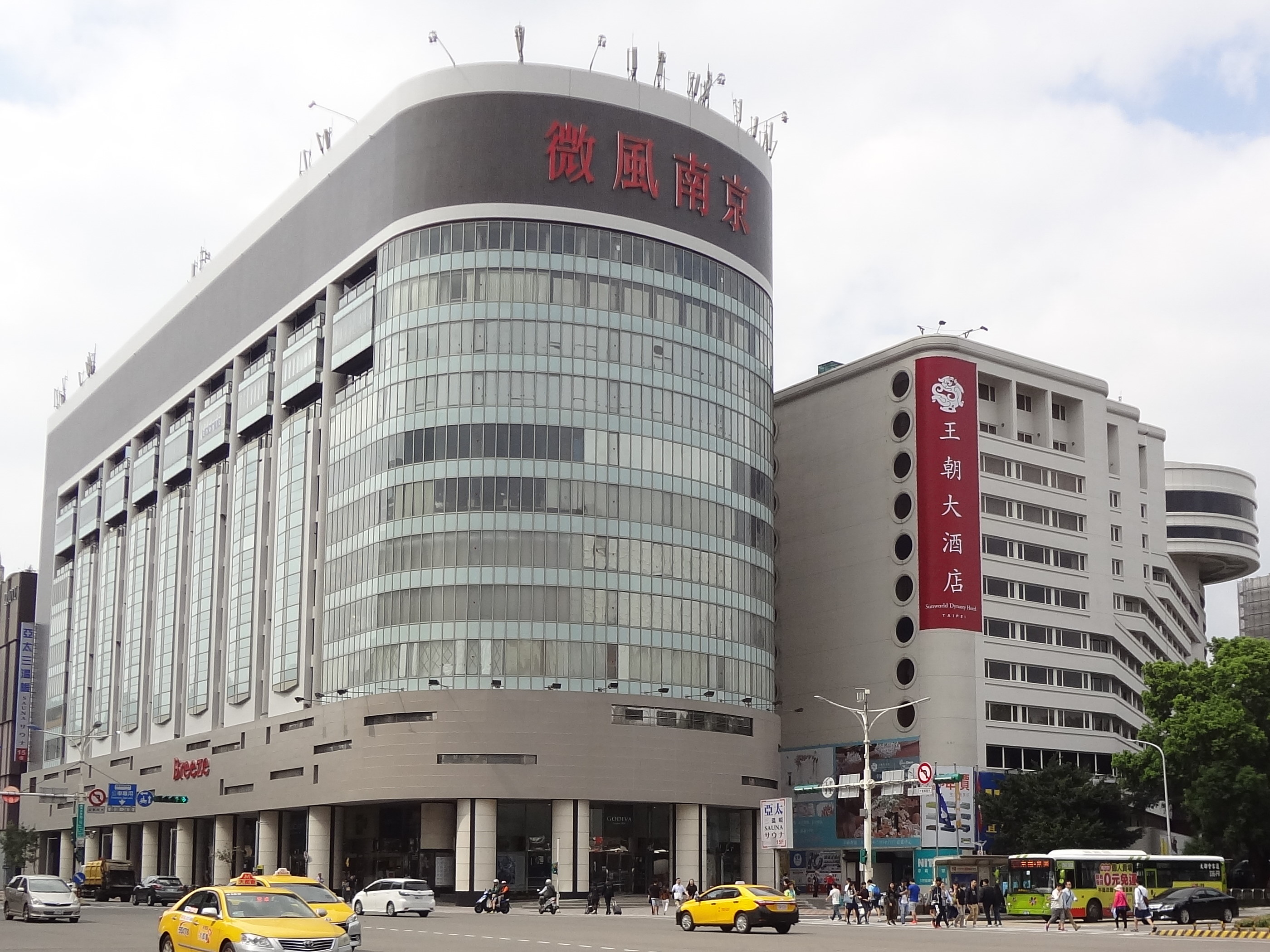
Exterior

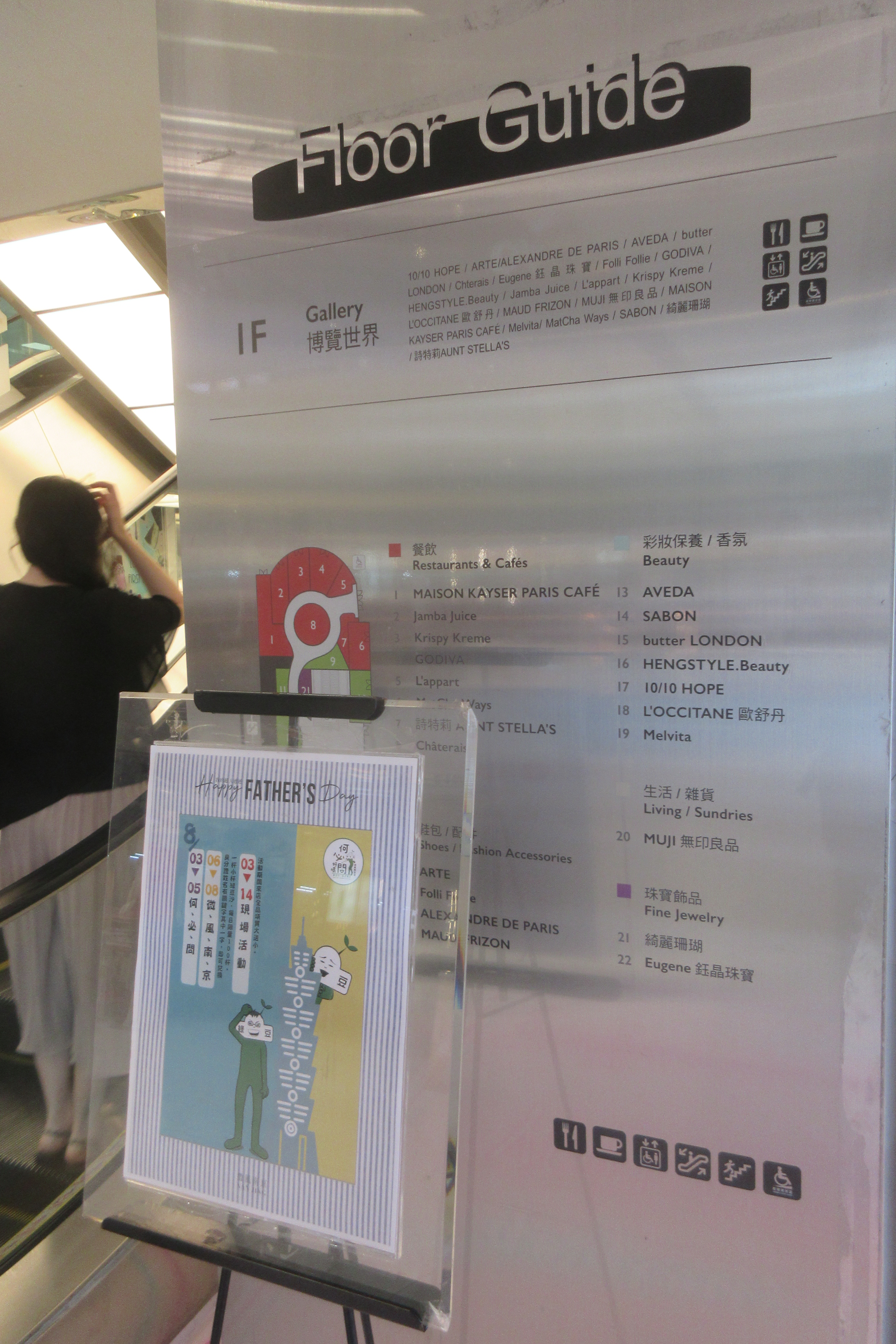
Floor Guide

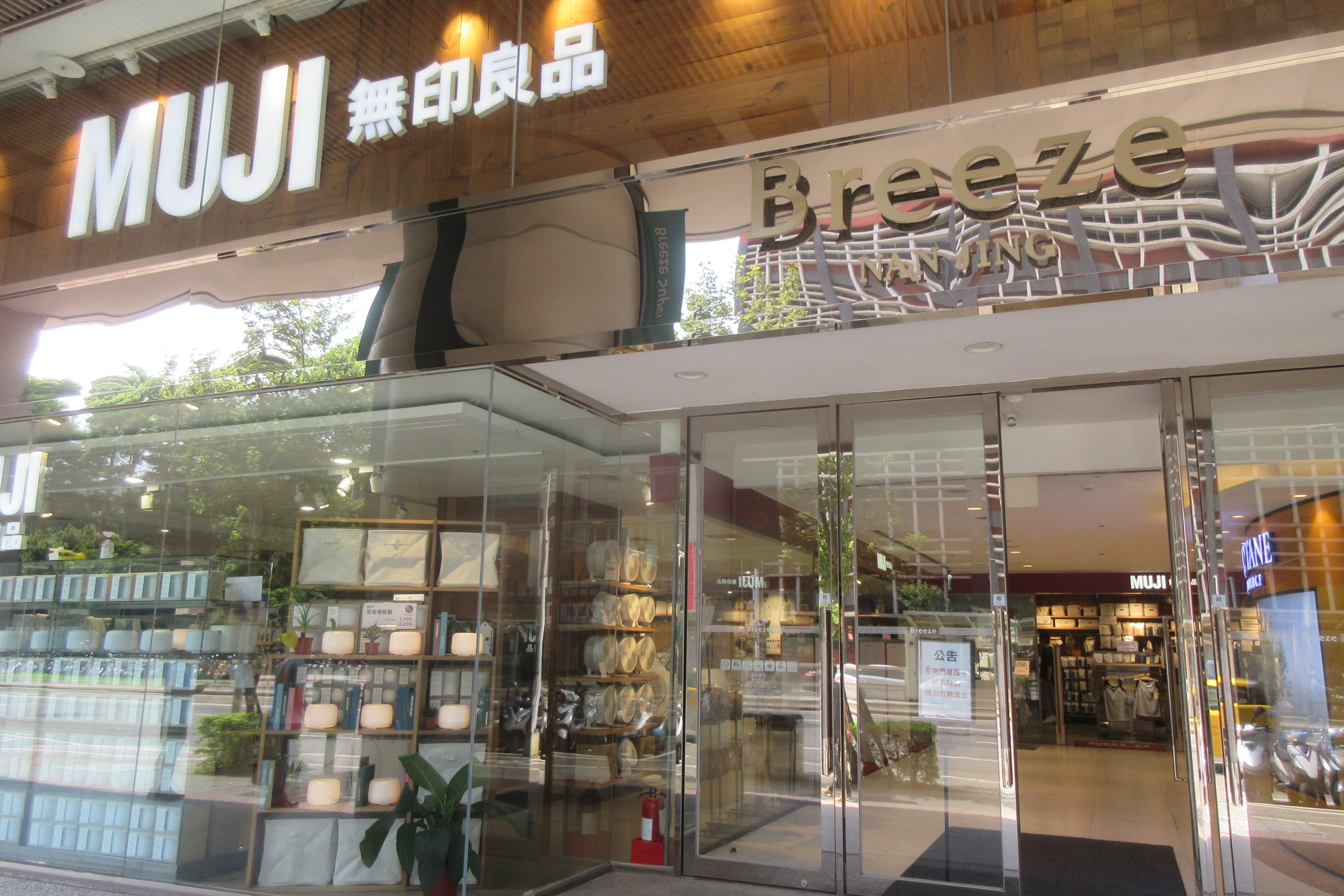
Muji

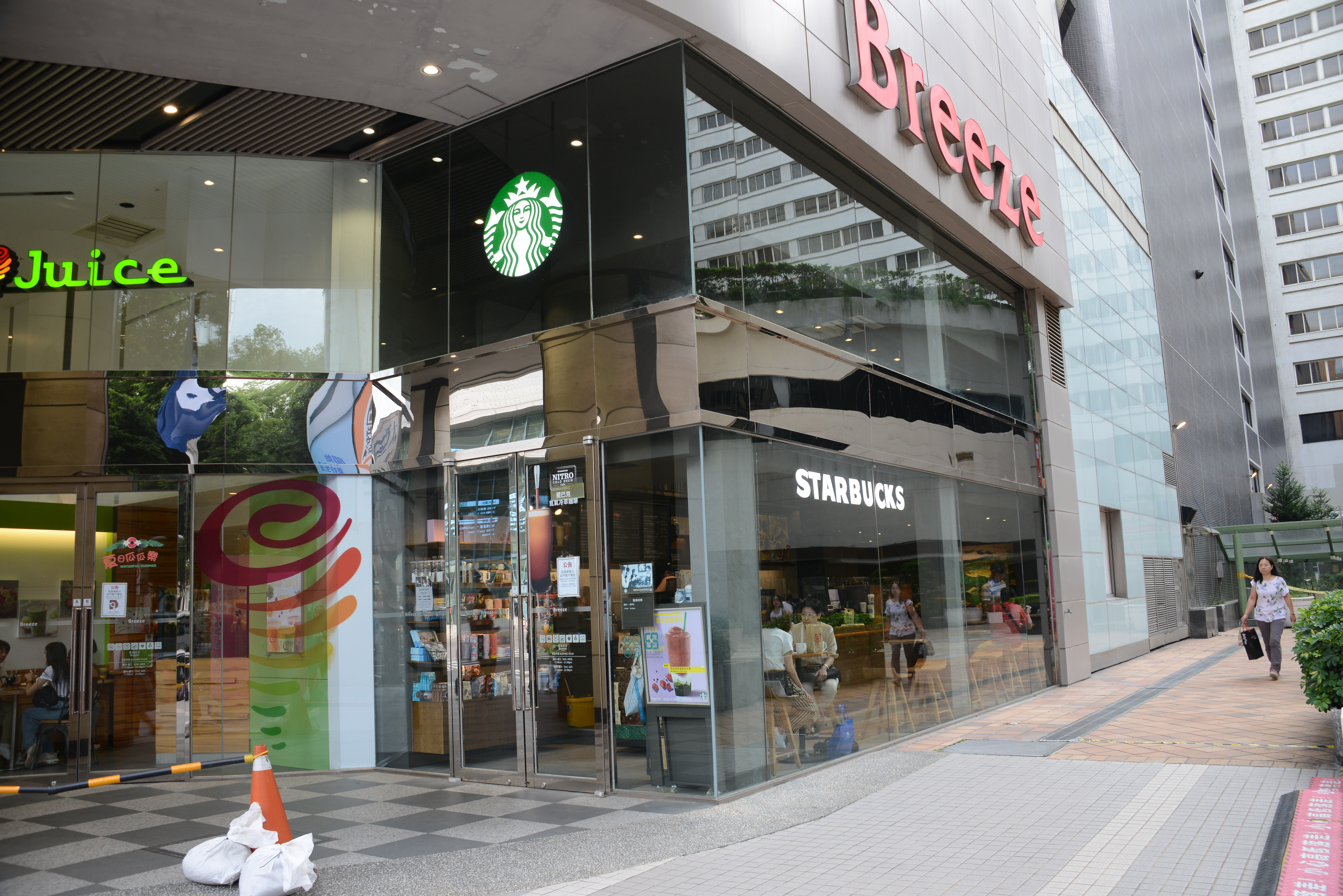
Starbucks

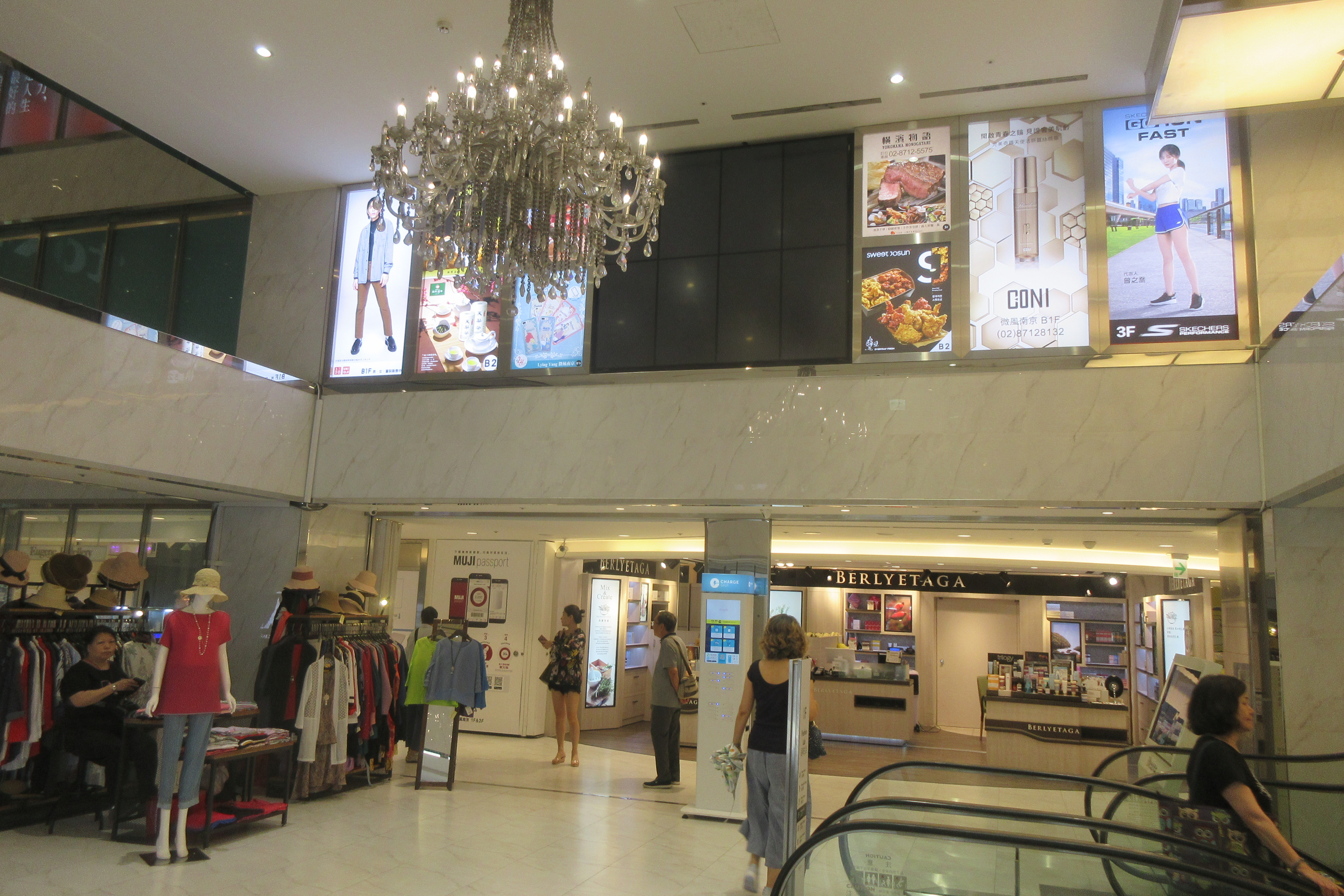
Interior

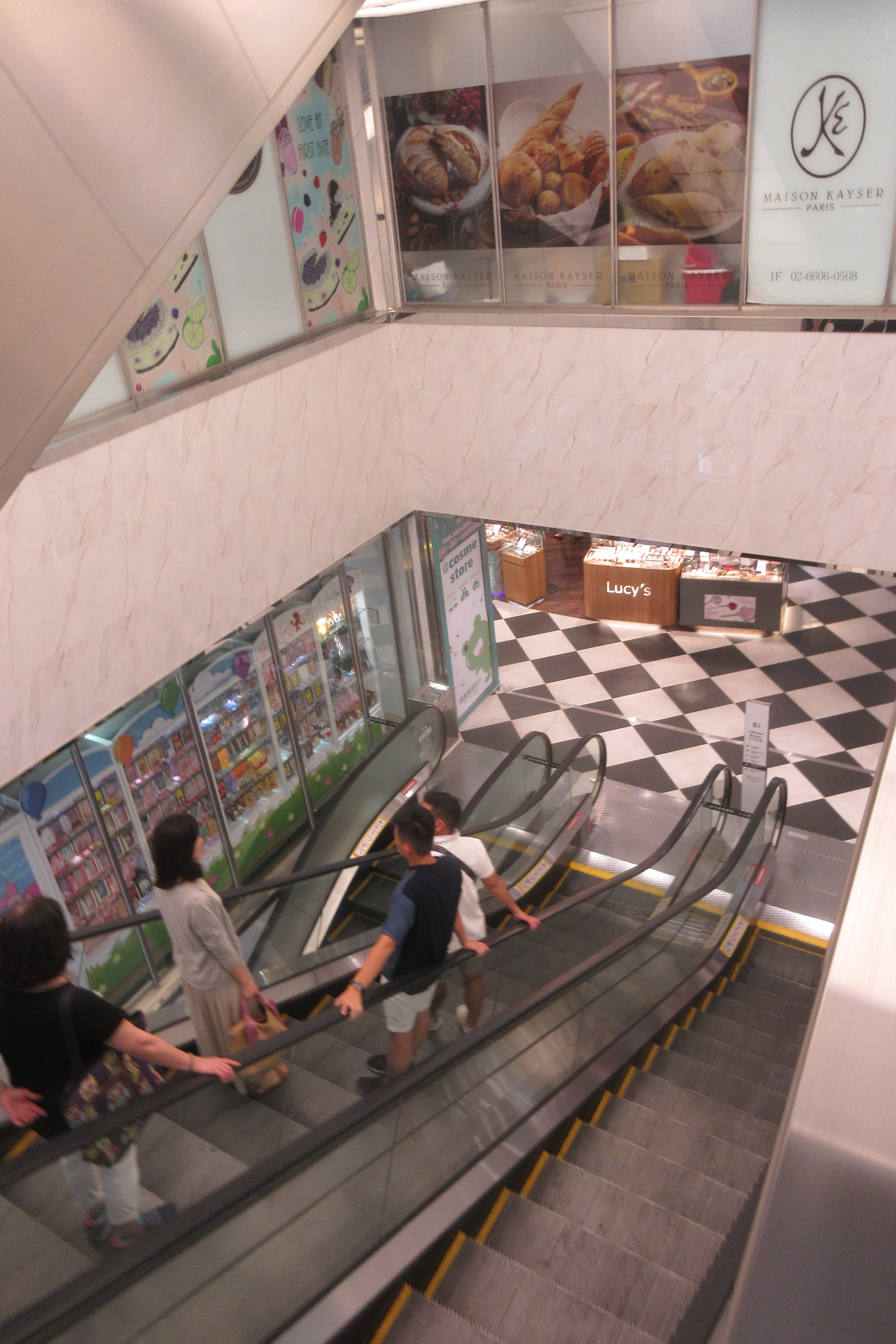
Atrium

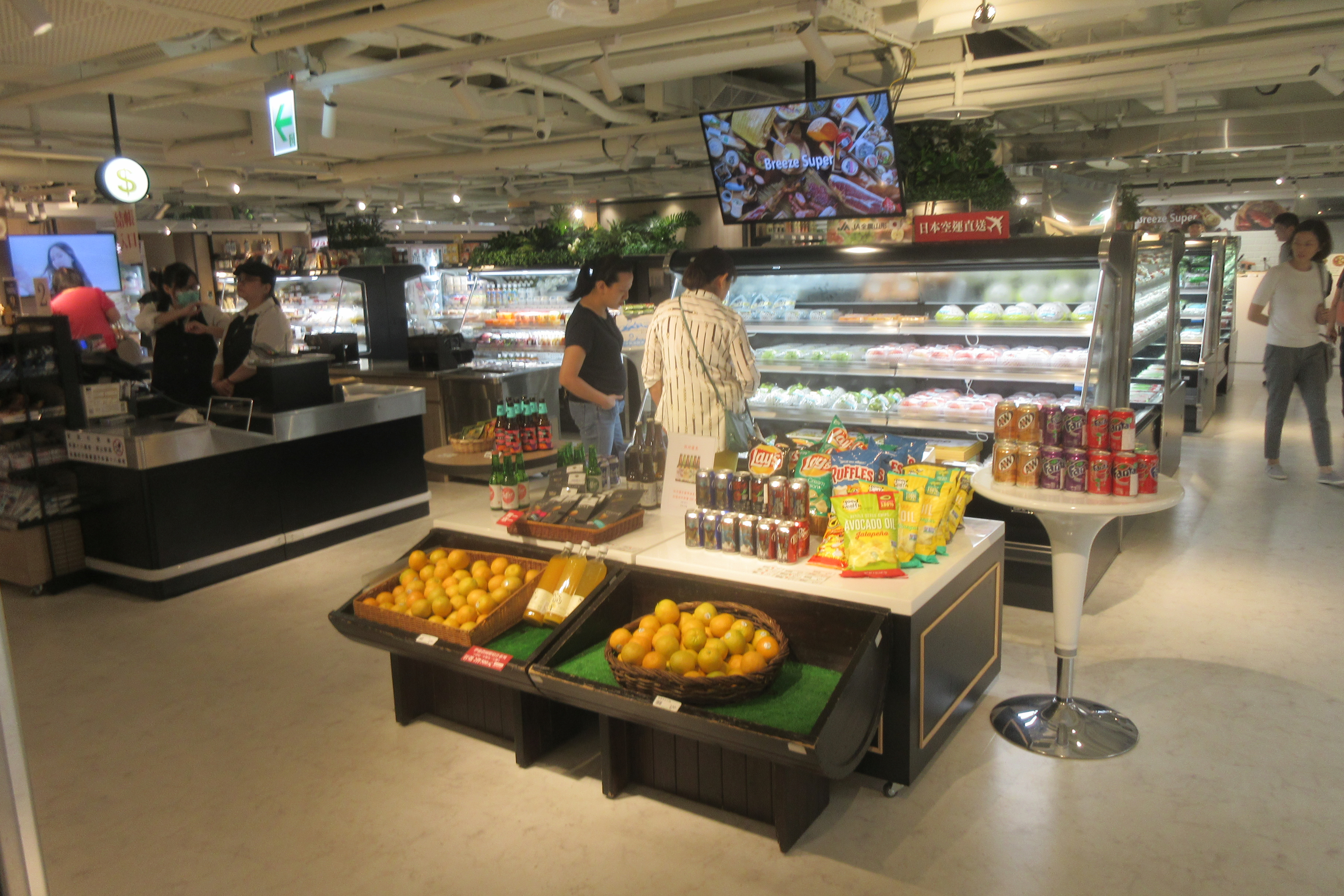
Food Hall

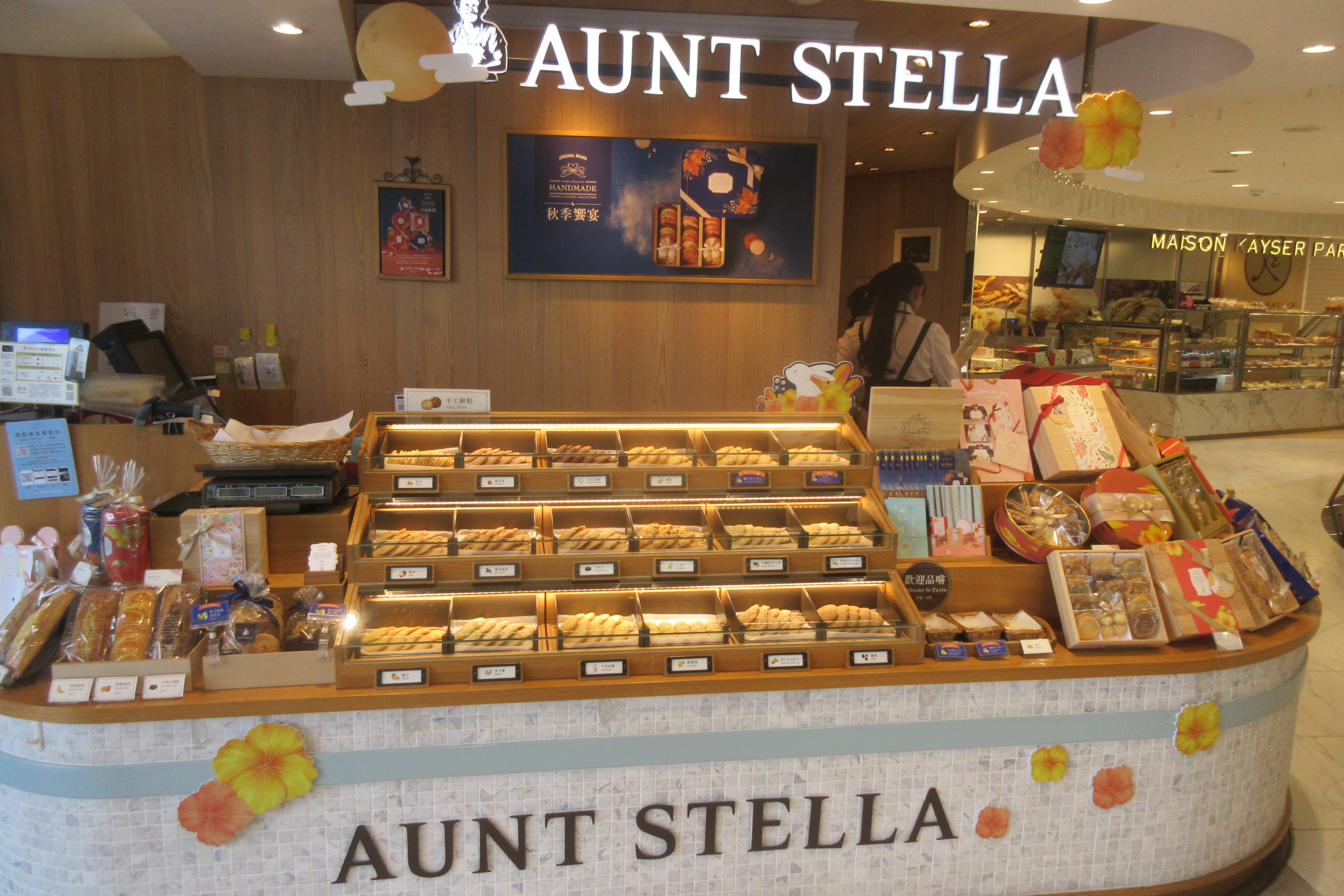
Aunt Stella

== See also ==
- List of tourist attractions in Taiwan
- List of shopping malls in Taipei
- Breeze Center
- Breeze Song Gao
