= USS Breese =

Wickes-class destroyer

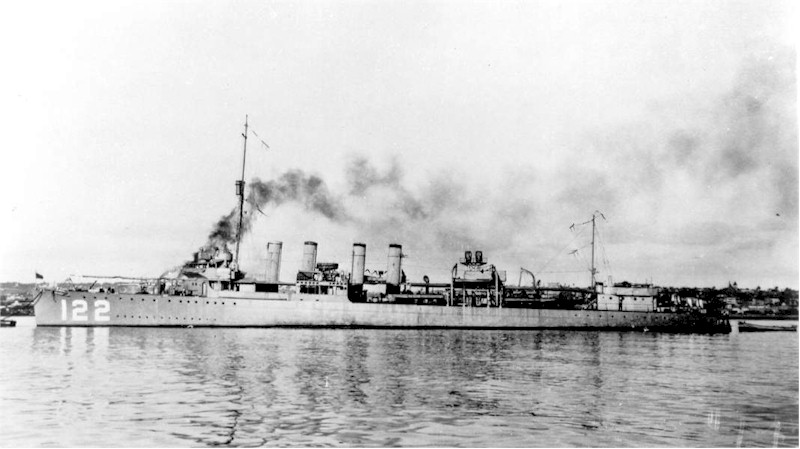
- USS Breese moored to a buoy circa 1920.

History

United States
- Name: Breese
- Namesake: Kidder Breese
- Builder: Newport News Shipbuilding and Dry Dock Company, Newport News, Virginia
- Cost: $1,342,900.09 (hull & machinery)
- Laid down: 10 November 1917
- Launched: 11 May 1918
- Commissioned: 23 October 1918
- Decommissioned: 17 June 1922
- Reclassified: Light minelayer (DM-18), 5 January 1931
- Recommissioned: 1 June 1931
- Decommissioned: 15 January 1946
- Stricken: 7 February 1946
- Fate: Sold for scrapping 16 May 1946

General characteristics
- Class & type: Wickes-class destroyer
- Displacement: 1,213.1 tons
- Length: 314 ft 5 in (95.83 m)
- Beam: 31 ft 8 in (9.65 m)
- Draft: 9 ft 4 in (2.84 m)
- Speed: 35 knots (65 km/h; 40 mph)
- Complement: 122 officers and enlisted
- Armament: 4 × 4 in (100 mm) guns; 2 × 3 in (76 mm) guns; 12 × 21 in (533 mm) torpedo tubes

USS Breese (DD-122) was a Wickes-class destroyer in the United States Navy during World War I, and later redesignated, DM-18 in World War II. She was the only ship named for Captain Kidder Breese.

Commissioned as a destroyer in 1919, she undertook a number of patrol and training duties along the East Coast of the United States until being decommissioned in 1922. Overhauled in 1931, she returned to service with the United States Pacific Fleet on training and patrol for the next 10 years. She was present during the attack on Pearl Harbor, and following this she supported several operations during the war, laying minefields and sweeping for mines in the Pacific. Following the end of the war, she was sold for scrap in 1946 and broken up.

== Design and construction ==
Breese was one of 111 Wickes-class destroyers built by the United States Navy between 1917 and 1919. She, along with ten of her sisters, were constructed at Newport News Shipbuilding shipyards in Newport News, Virginia using specifications and detail designs drawn up by Bath Iron Works.

She had a standard displacement of 1,213 tonnes (1,194 long tons; 1,337 short tons) an overall length of 314 feet 5 inches (95.83 m), a beam of 31 feet 8 inches (9.65 m) and a draft of 9 feet 4 inches (2.84 m). On trials, Harding reached a speed of 33.2 knots (61.5 km/h; 38.2 mph). She was armed with four 4"/50 caliber guns, two 3"/23 caliber guns, and twelve 21-inch torpedo tubes. She had a regular crew complement of 122 officers and enlisted men. She was driven by two Parsons or Westinghouse turbines, and powered by four Normand boilers.

Specifics on Breese's performance are not known, but she was one of the group of Wickes-class destroyers known unofficially as the 'Liberty Type' to differentiate them from the destroyers constructed from detail designs drawn up by Bethlehem, which used Curtis steam turbines and Yarrow boilers. The Bethlehem destroyers deteriorated badly in service, and in 1929 all 60 of this group were retired by the Navy. Actual performance of these ships was far below intended specifications especially in fuel economy, with most only able to make 2,300 nautical miles (4,260 km; 2,647 mi) at 15 knots (28 km/h; 17 mph) instead of the design standard of 3,100 nautical miles (5,741 km; 3,567 mi) at 20 knots (37 km/h; 23 mph). The class also suffered problems with turning and weight. Ships such as Breese, however, performed better than this.

Breese was the only U.S. Navy ship to be named for Kidder Breese, who had been a U.S. Navy officer during the Mexican–American War and later the Civil War.

== Service history ==
=== Interwar period ===
Breese was launched on 11 May 1918 out of Newport News, Virginia. She was sponsored by Gilbert McIlvaine, daughter of Breese; and commissioned 23 October 1918. After her commissioning, she reported to the United States Atlantic Fleet and cruised for several days as an escort for convoys supporting World War I, before the end of the conflict on 11 November. Returning to Norfolk, Virginia at the end of the war, she was assigned to Destroyer Division 12 and served off the coast of Cuba on training exercises during the spring of 1919. In July 1919, Destroyer Division 12 was assigned to the United States Pacific Fleet, based at San Diego, California. For the next year, she served with Destroyer Squadron 4 and, from June 1920, began operating in Rotating Reserve. From October 1920 to June 1922, she participated in division maneuvers and fleet maneuvers with the Pacific Fleet's main battle force, and she was placed out of commission 17 June 1922.

On 5 January 1931, Breese was redesignated as a light minelayer, with the hull classification symbol of DM-18. Following an overhaul and conversion at Mare Island Navy Yard, she was recommissioned on 1 June 1931. She then returned to San Diego for sea trials and standardization tests in her new role. These completed, she departed for Pearl Harbor. She was assigned to Mine Division 1 of the Pacific Fleet, and operated out of Hawaiian waters. She conducted several training exercises, including with the submarine divisions where she served as a target ship. She also served as a station ship for aircraft. She returned to San Diego in June 1937, and placed out of commission and in reserve on 12 November 1937. On 25 September 1939, Breese was again recommissioned and assigned to Mine Division 5 of the Pacific Fleet. On 2 November 1939, she arrived at Puget Sound Navy Yard and began to conduct Neutrality Patrol off the Oregon and Washington coasts. Throughout 1940, she cruised to different bases along the coastline of Alaska with the commander of the Alaskan Sector aboard. Upon returning, she rejoined Mine Division 5 in San Francisco and steamed for Hawaii, returning there on 10 December 1940. Attached to Mine Division 2 in the Pacific Fleet, she took part in training exercises in the operating area and on the Maui range during much of 1941.

=== World War II ===
On 7 December 1941, Breese was moored in the Middle Loch, northwest of Ford Island. She was moored to Buoy D-3 alongside a nest of three other minelayers which were also converted Wickes destroyers; Ramsay, Montgomery, and Gamble. At the outbreak of the attack, her crew was distracted by the initial assault on Ford Island and was buzzed by a flight of Nakajima B5N torpedo bombers. Breese quickly loaded her machine guns and began firing at 07:57. She and many of the other ships in the area were quickly able to mobilize a strong anti-aircraft defense which lasted throughout the morning. She was credited with hits on several Japanese aircraft and damaging at least one midget submarine. Breese was undamaged in the attack.

Following the attack on Pearl Harbor, she remained berthed in the harbor until leaving on 26 December, carrying mail and orders for other ships. She rendezvoused with Southard at the mouth of the harbor to offload this, then steamed east on patrol.

On 6 June 1942, she took on 84 survivors of the carrier Yorktown which had sunk in the aftermath of the Battle of Midway. During the summer of 1942, she operated out of the South Pacific On 3 August 1942, she, along with minesweepers Gamble and Tracy, were laying mines in Segond Channel, Espiritu Santo. Destroyer Tucker entered the strait on escort patrol, having not been notified of the minefield, when she struck one of the mines and sank. Breese, which was moored in the channel, rendered aid. On 30 September 1942, she was on a nighttime exercise off Espiritu Santo when she was damaged in a collision with the cruiser San Francisco. She carried out minesweeping duties during the consolidation of the Solomon Islands from 1–13 May 1943, where she was assigned to Task Group 36.5 alongside Gamble, Preble, and Radford. They laid mined in Blackett Strait to guard the western approaches to Kula Gulf.

She supported Allied efforts around New Georgia-Rendova Vangunu from 29 June to 25 August. Assigned to Task Unit 36.2.2, she, Preble and Gamble laid mines off Shortland Harbor, Bougainville. She then supported the occupation and defense of Cape Torokina conducting minesweeping duties there from 1 to 8 November. She later supported the Leyte landings from 12 to 24 October 1944. She was subsequently among the ships to support the Lingayen Gulf landings from 4 to 18 January 1945. She supported the Battle of Iwo Jima from 7 February to 7 March. She undertook mine duties supporting the Battle of Okinawa between 25 March and 30 June. In her final act of the war, she steamed in support of the United States Third Fleet near mainland Japan between 5 and 31 July. In August and September 1945 Breese swept mines in the East China Sea and Kyūshū-Korean area following the end of the war.

On 7 November 1945, Breese steamed to the west coast arriving 26 November. She transited the Panama Canal and arrived at New York City on 13 December. She was decommissioned on 15 January 1946 and sold for scrap on 16 May 1946. She received ten battle stars for her service in World War II.

== Sources ==
- Dictionary of American naval fighting ships / Vol.1, Historical sketches : letters A through B, Washington, D.C.: Department of the Navy, 1959, OCLC 551573855, archived from the original on 30 January 2006
- Cressman, Robert J. (1999), Official Chronology of the United States Navy in World War II, Annapolis, Maryland: Naval Institute Press, ISBN 978-1557501493
- Friedman, Norman (2003), United States Destroyers: An Illustrated Design History, Annapolis, Maryland: Naval Institute Press, ISBN 978-1-55750-442-5
- Gardiner, Robert; Gray, Randal (1985), Conway's All the World's Fighting Ships 1906–1921, Volume 2, Annapolis, Maryland: Naval Institute Press, ISBN 978-0-87021-907-8
- McWilliams, Bill (2011), Sunday in Hell: Pearl Harbor Minute by Minute, New York City, New York: E. Rights/E-Reads, Ltd. Publishers, ISBN 978-1617564123
