= Roger Breeze =

Roger G.Breeze
- Born: October 10, 1946
- Died: June 14, 2016 (aged 69)
- Resting place: Staten Island, New York
- Education: Manchester Grammar School; University of Glasgow
- Scientific career
- Fields: Respiratory diseases of animals, biological weapons defense
- Workplaces: Plum Island Animal Disease Center
- Thesis: Fog fever and acute respiratory syndromes of cattle (1973)
- Doctoral advisor: H.M. Pirie

Roger Gerrard Breeze (10 October 1946 – 14 June 2016) was an English veterinary scientist who was an expert on bio-terrorism, and a critic of mass culling to combat foot and mouth disease in animals.

Breeze graduated from Manchester Grammar School then went to the University of Glasgow (1964–1973), where he received his Bachelor of Veterinary Medicine and Surgery and a PhD in Veterinary Pathology. He remained at the university as a lecturer from 1968 until 1977. He subsequently moved to Washington State University, where he was professor and chair of the Department of Microbiology and Pathology from 1977 to 1987, then deputy director at the University of Washington Technology Center from 1984 to 1987.

Breeze moved into the service of the US federal government in 1987, becoming director of the Plum Island Animal Disease Center which was part of the Agricultural Research Service (ARS) of the United States Department of Agriculture (USDA). In 1995, he became Area Director of the ARS, and then in 1998, Associate Administrator.

In 1988, for his work on biodefence at Plum Island, Breeze received the Distinguished Executive Award from President Clinton. This award is given to members of the Senior Executive Service to reward exemplary service.

From 2004 to 2015, Breeze was CEO, owner and president of Centaur Science Group. From 2011, Breeze was Bio-Security Deputy Program Director at the Lawrence Livermore National Laboratory.

== Selected works ==
- Breeze, Roger Gerrard (1973). Fog fever and acute respiratory syndromes of cattle (PhD). University of Glasgow.
- Breeze, R.G.; Pirie, H.M.; Selman, I.E.; Wiseman, A. (October 1974). "Fog fever: Provocation tests with Dictyocaulus viviparus". Journal of Comparative Pathology. 84 (4): 577–588. doi:10.1016/0021-9975(74)90049-8. PMID 4282616.
- Breeze, RG; Pirie, HM; Selman, IE; Wiseman, A (January 1975). "Fog fever in cattle: cytology of the hyperplastic alveolar epithelium". Journal of Comparative Pathology. 85 (1): 147–56. doi:10.1016/0021-9975(75)90093-6. PMID 165224.
- Breeze, RG; Carlson, JR (1982). "Chemical-induced lung injury in domestic animals". Advances in Veterinary Science and Comparative Medicine. 26: 201–31. PMID 6758539.
- Breeze, RG (April 2006). "Technology, public policy and control of transboundary livestock diseases in our lifetimes". Revue Scientifique et Technique. 25 (1): 271–92. doi:10.20506/rst.25.1.1666. PMID 16796054.
