= Evan Breeze =

Welsh poet and schoolmaster (1798–1855)

Evan Breeze (1798–1855) was a Welsh poet and schoolmaster. He used the bardic name Ieuan Cadfan.

His published works include Yr Odlydd Cysurus, cyfaill i'r trallodus yn cynnwys amrywiol ddyriau, cofiant am amrai anwylion…carolau…emynau, etc. a volume of religious poems which was published in 1839 by H. Jones, Llanrwst. Breeze also preached at the local Wesleyan chapel.

He died and was buried in Llanerfyl in 1855.
