= Breeze (ship) =

Replica 19th C ship in New Zealand

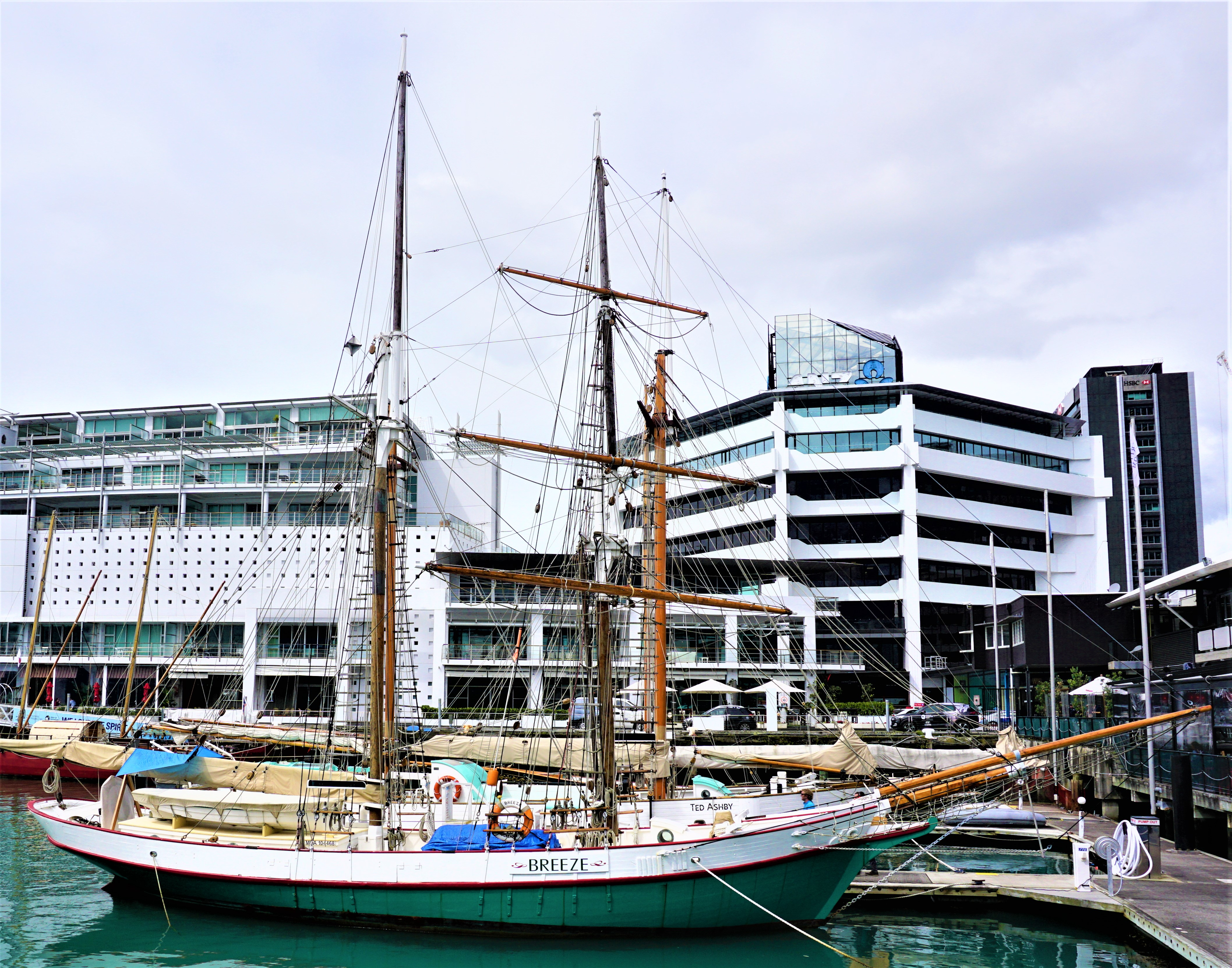
- Breeze berthed at the New Zealand Maritime Museum

History

New Zealand
- Name: Breeze
- Owner: 1981–1989: Ralph Sewell; 1989–present: New Zealand Maritime Museum
- Port of registry: Auckland, New Zealand
- Builder: Ralph Sewell

General characteristics
- Type: Brigantine
- Displacement: 25.4 tonnes
- Length: 60 ft (18.3 m)
- Beam: 16.6 ft (5.1 m)
- Draught: 6 ft (1.8 m)

Breeze is a replica 19th-century brigantine built by Ralph Sewell and his family in Coromandel. It is one of four seaworthy ships berthed at the New Zealand Maritime Museum Hui Te Ananui a Tangaroa. It launched in 1981.

== History ==
=== Construction ===
Breeze was built by Ralph Sewell in Tiki Landing in the Coromandel. While originally training as a boat builder, Sewell had worked on pipe organ construction projects for years. Constructing Breeze was his first foray back into boat building, after constructing organs such as the St Marks's Church organ at Te Aroha, and the Wellington Town Hall organ. He built it in the tradition of 19th-century coastal traders. Rodney Wilson described the project to be "[...] driven by a desire to produce something public, to contribute to the community's knowledge and feeling for its maritime past." This was echoed by Sewell himself in an article he wrote for Sea Spray magazine in August 1981, describing Breeze as an 'adventure ship' for with the purpose of teaching sailing techniques and building communities of those with like-minded interests in sailing and the sea.

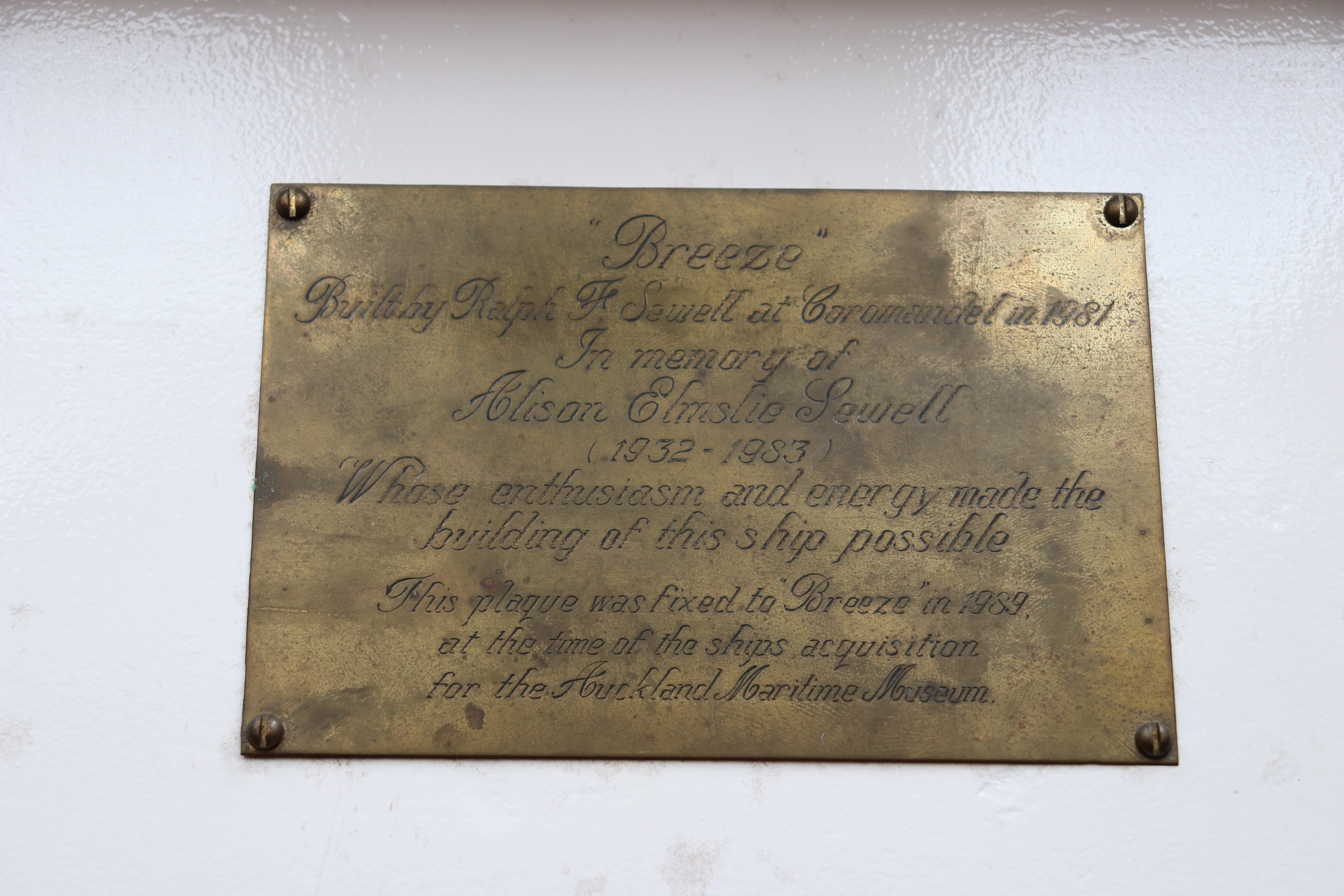
Plaque on Breeze in the memory of Alison Sewell

Sewell wrote extensively about the construction of Breeze. Committed to sticking to traditional methods of construction, Sewell chose not to use any machinery to build the boat. Further, Tiki Landing was also windmill powered. He writes "We are building Breeze out of best Coromandel kauri in traditional manner, using adze, drawknife, slick, wooden German jack plane and caulking iron." Breeze is constructed with kauri, totara and pōhutukawa. It has 11 sails, and the bow below the waterline, allowing Breeze to travel more efficiently but still remain buoyant enough to support the weight of the sails. There was no machinery on the boat either, bar a vintage six-cylinder Lister auxiliary engine. Prior to building Breeze, Sewell built ketch Ripple in a similar fashion. The lack of machinery on the boat "put the emphasis on good seamanship, physical effort and self-sufficiency," Sewell wrote.

=== Early life ===
Sewell had trouble selling Breeze because it had not completed a marine survey test, and was unable to carry passengers. The marine survey was about the cost of the boat. Bob Hawkins wrote that Breeze had "[...] not been completed to marine survey standards which limited her operation as a training vessel." Sewell formed a sailing club of enthusiasts and volunteers to sail Breeze, called 'Breeze Sailing Club.' In this club was Captain Jim Cottier, Peter Sewell (one of Sewell's sons), and Bob Hawkins.

=== Anti-nuclear protests ===
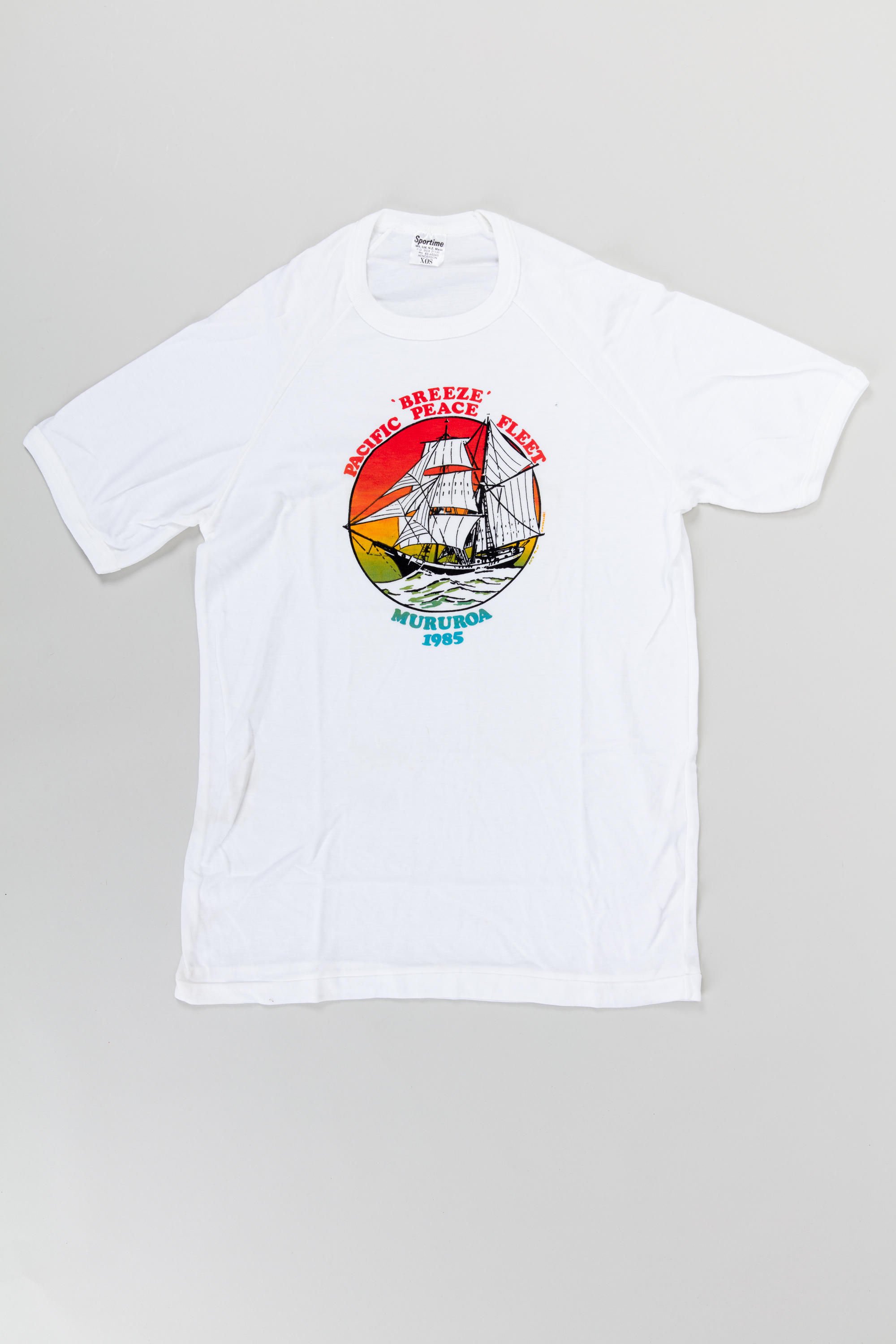
T-shirt from Moruroa protests, worn on Breeze (from NZMM online collections)

After the bombing of the Rainbow Warrior by French agents in 1985, Sewell let Captain Jim Cottier sail the Breeze to Moruroa as part of the peace flotilla to protest French nuclear testing in place of Rainbow Warrior. Jim Cottier had been with the Breeze since Sewell's construction of the boat and part of the committee and was familiar in sailing it, and had previously sailed to Moruroa in July 1972 on Tamure. He had also sailed there in the Spirit of Peace in 1973.

The crew included Rob Morton (first mate), Mike Stickland, Jody Lusk, Alice Heather, Tony Atkinson (the ship's doctor), Richard Rae, Turi Blake, Robyn McWilliams and Brian Latham (cameraman). They left Admiralty Steps, Auckland following Vega and Alliance on 7 September 1985 carrying "several hundred letters of protest to be delivered to Tahiti." Also sailing with Breeze was Varangian and Greenpeace. The flotilla engaged with the French navy and both Greenpeace and Breeze were barred from sailing into Tahiti's ports and docking at Pape'ete. Breeze was still able to deliver the letters to Oscar Temaru at sea. They returned to New Zealand on 17 November 1985.

Breeze also carried food, water and other provisions. During their trip, they frequently exchanged and received supplies from other boats in the peace flotilla (Greenpeace), as well as Tahitians who rowed out to meet them.

Jody Lusk, one of the crew who sailed to Moruroa, also took part in the Moruroa Peace Flotilla in 1995, sailing on the MV Greenpeace as a chef. She has also worked on Rainbow Warrior II.

After it returned from French Polynesia, Breeze resided in the Kerikeri inlet until Sewell and the Maritime Museum brokered a sale. Roger Morris captained Breeze to Auckland on 3 September 1989.

=== New Zealand Maritime Museum ===
Breeze was acquired by the New Zealand Maritime Museum in 1989, and is either docked at the museum wharf, or used by the maritime museum for voyages around the Waitematā Harbour. There were major works and repairs completed before taking resident in Hobson Wharf as part of the Museum. Its acquisition and participation in events in the Auckland harbour representing the New Zealand Maritime Museum was documented in many articles in Bearings, a magazine published by the Auckland Maritime Museum. Breeze participated in events such as the Russell Tall Ships Regatta, opening ceremonies at Auckland Anniversary Day and the Auckland Anniversary Regatta.

Breeze came first and took handicap honours at the 1990 Tall Ships Race, captained by Jim Cottier. In the same year, Breeze also participated in Auckland Anniversary Day Regatta, captained by Robert Hawkins. In the same year, Breeze's Duradon sails were replaced by Peter Sewell and Shore Sails with cotton-polyester sails.

Breeze won the 1991 Tall Ships Race in Russell, and competed in the friendly competition, the Hobson Wharf Heritage Vessel Race on 24 February 1991, where it did not take home any prizes. It competed against Ripple. The boats raced from Orakei Wharf to Princes Wharf.

Breeze was unable to participate in the 1992 Russell Tall Ships Race, Auckland Anniversary Day Regatta, or Mahurangi Regatta as it was participating in a recreation of the arrival of Abel Tasman in February. Money was raised to install a new engine. Breeze participated in the handing over ceremony of Hobson Wharf in March 1992. The Breeze did not attend the 2019 Russell Tall Ships Race.

In 1992, Breeze sailed down to Nelson to take part in sesquicentennial celebrations. She sailed around North Cape and Cape Reinga before heading down towards the West Coast and Marlborough Sounds to Nelson. Both Rob Morton and Roger Morris were onboard. They left from the Viaduct Basin in January and arrived in Nelson at the end of the month. Morton described the trip for Bearings, writing "We cruised from one bay to the next, up to the shop at Totara North and back. We caught kahawai and climbed up hills, splashed around under waterfalls and generally took it easy." At the time of Morton's article, there were plans in place to replace Breeze's engine.

On 18 December 2000, Breeze was finally granted a MNZ certificate which allowed it to carry passengers on paid trips. Under this certificate, passengers can not be carried outside of Auckland harbour limits, so longer trips were opportunities for volunteers to gain experience. Breeze undergoes annual maintenance at the Vos/Sanford slipway in Westhaven. Until 2016, Breeze made regular trips to the Bay of Islands.

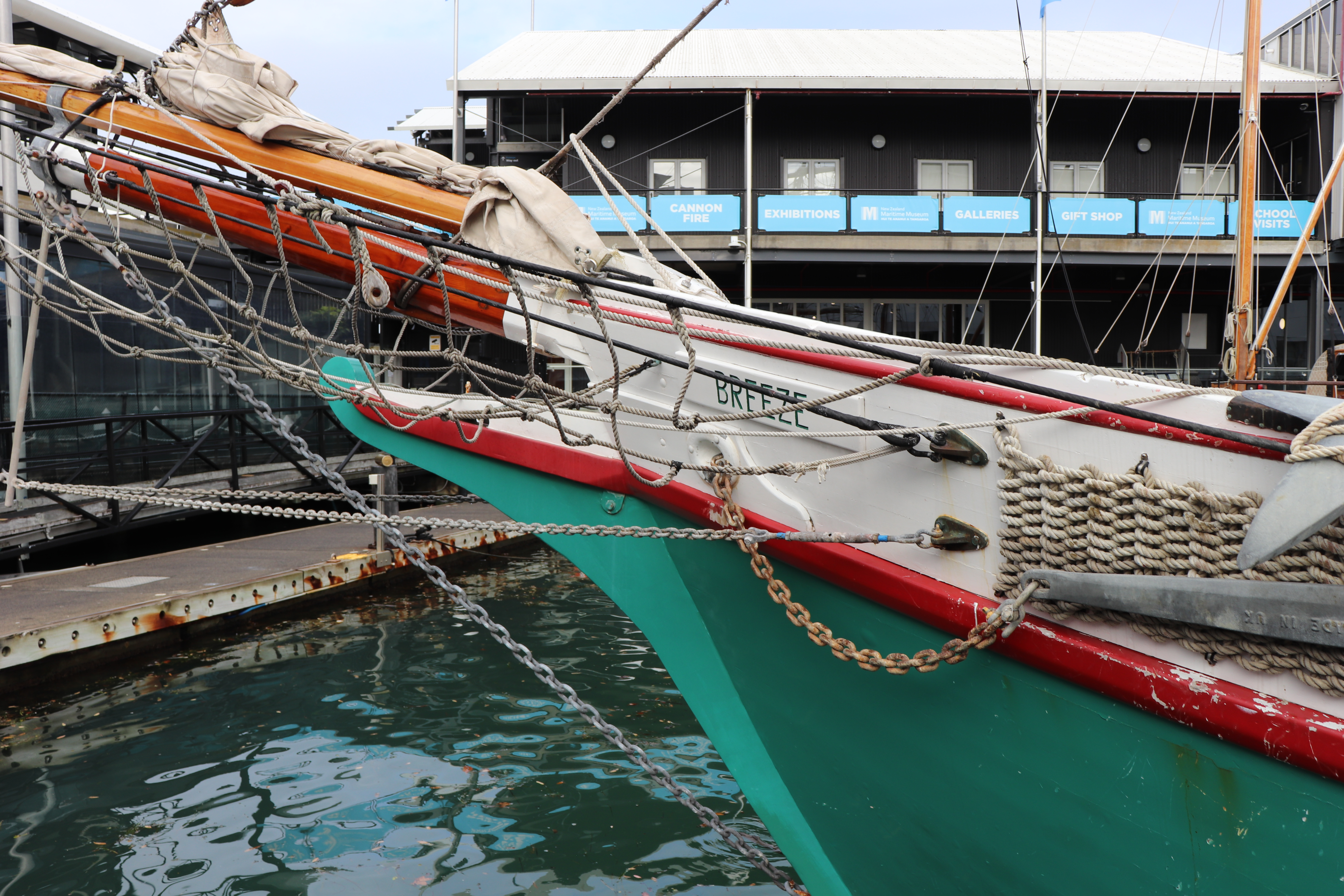
Bow of Breeze

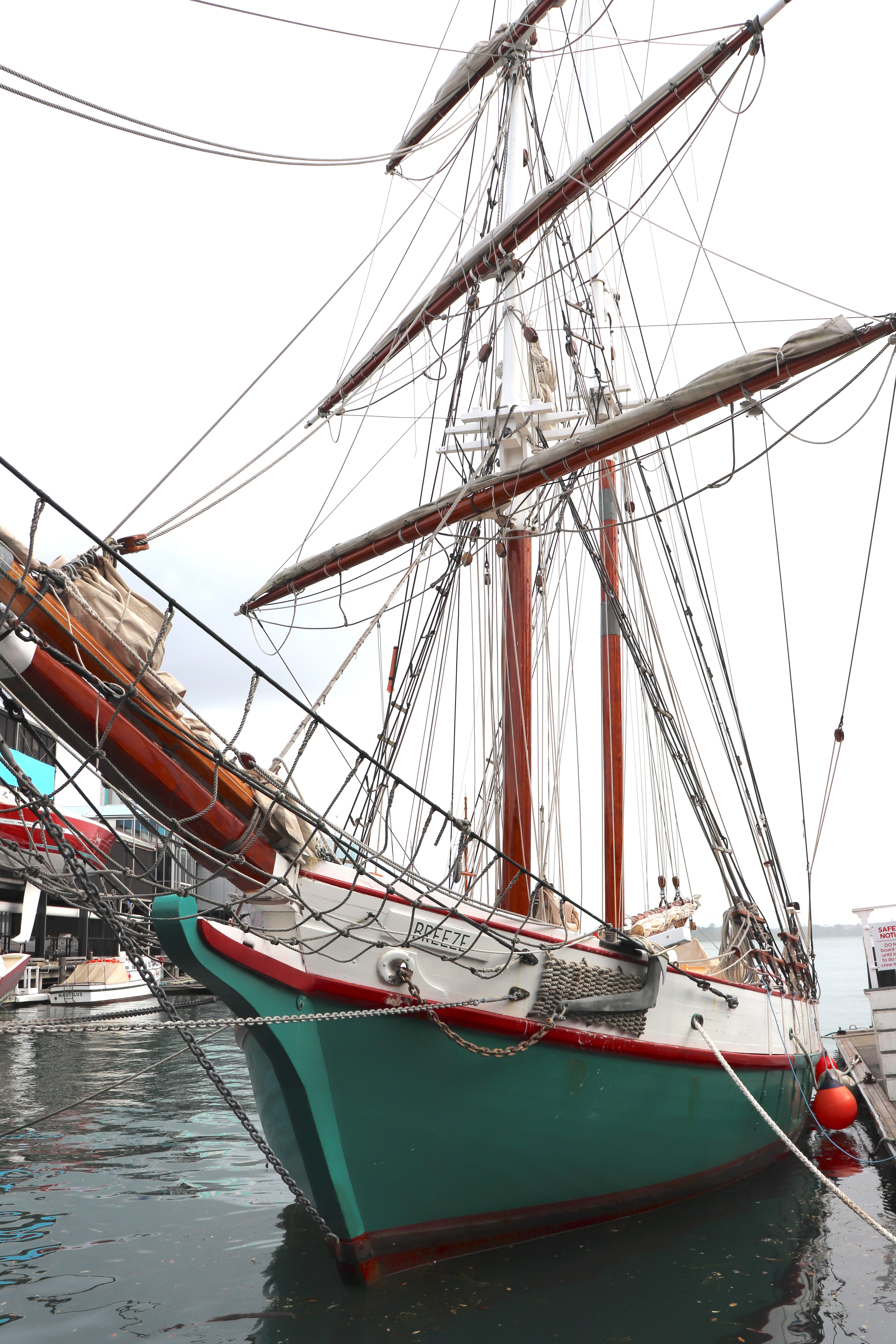
Breeze with rigging

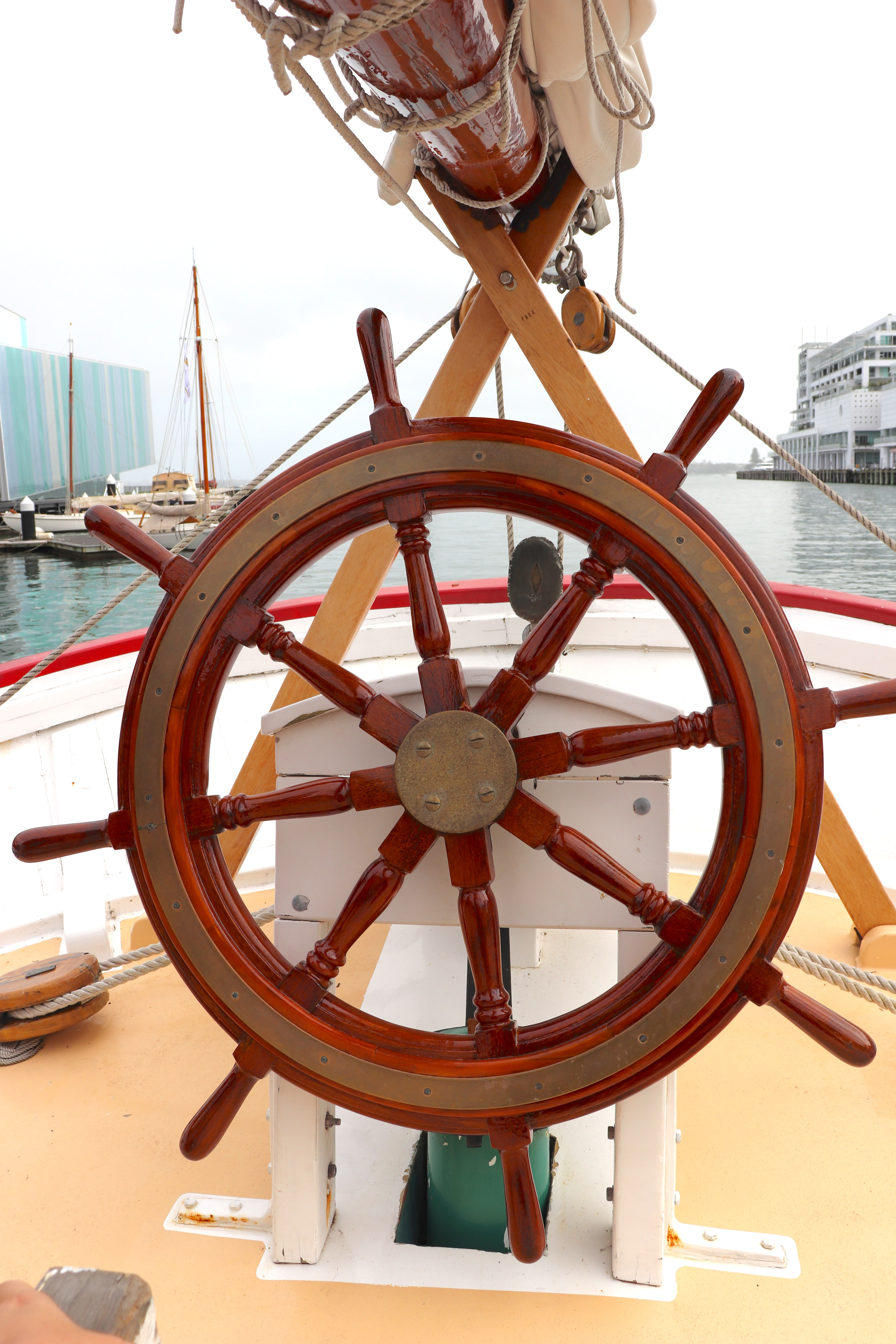
Ship's wheel on Breeze

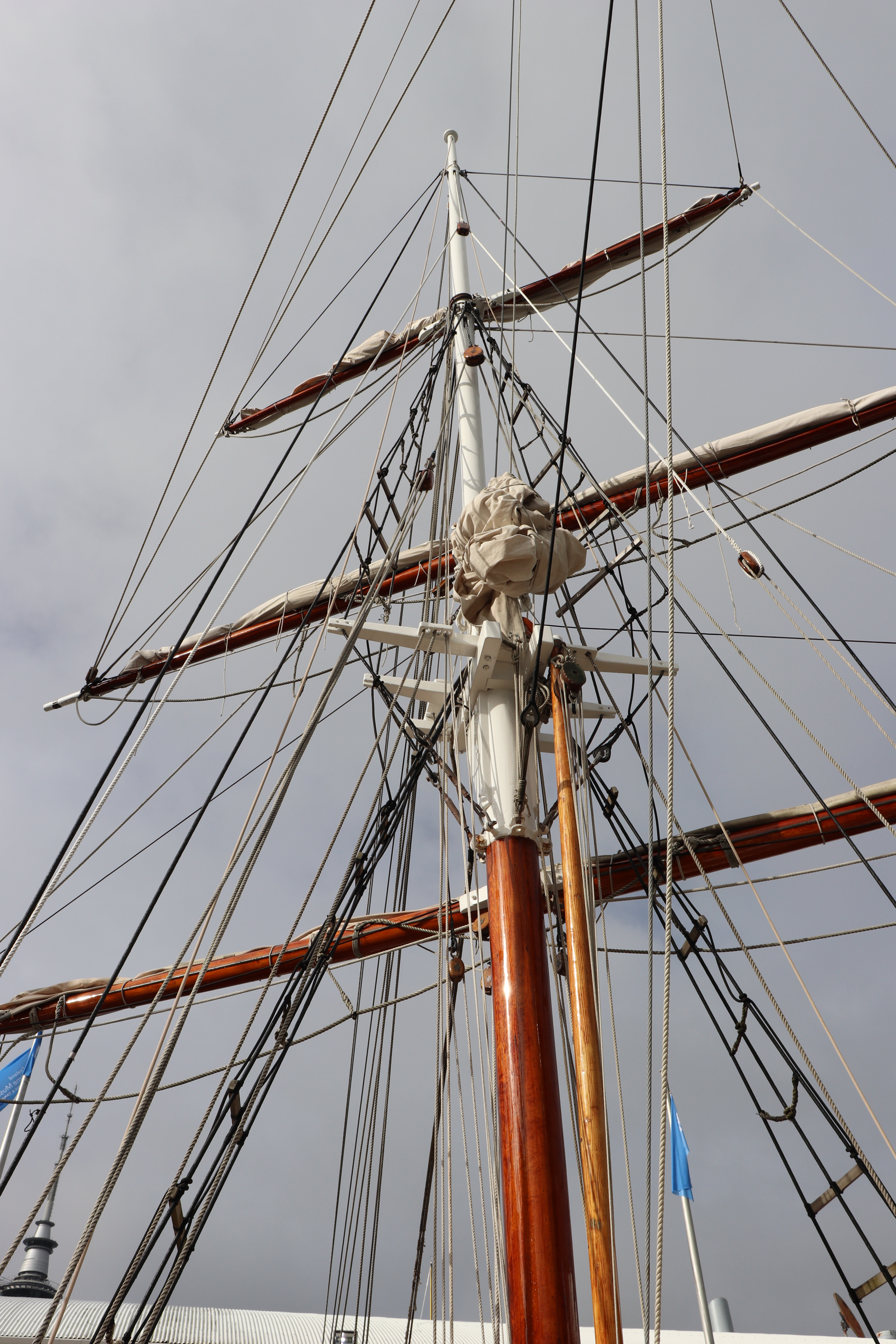
Breeze's square sails

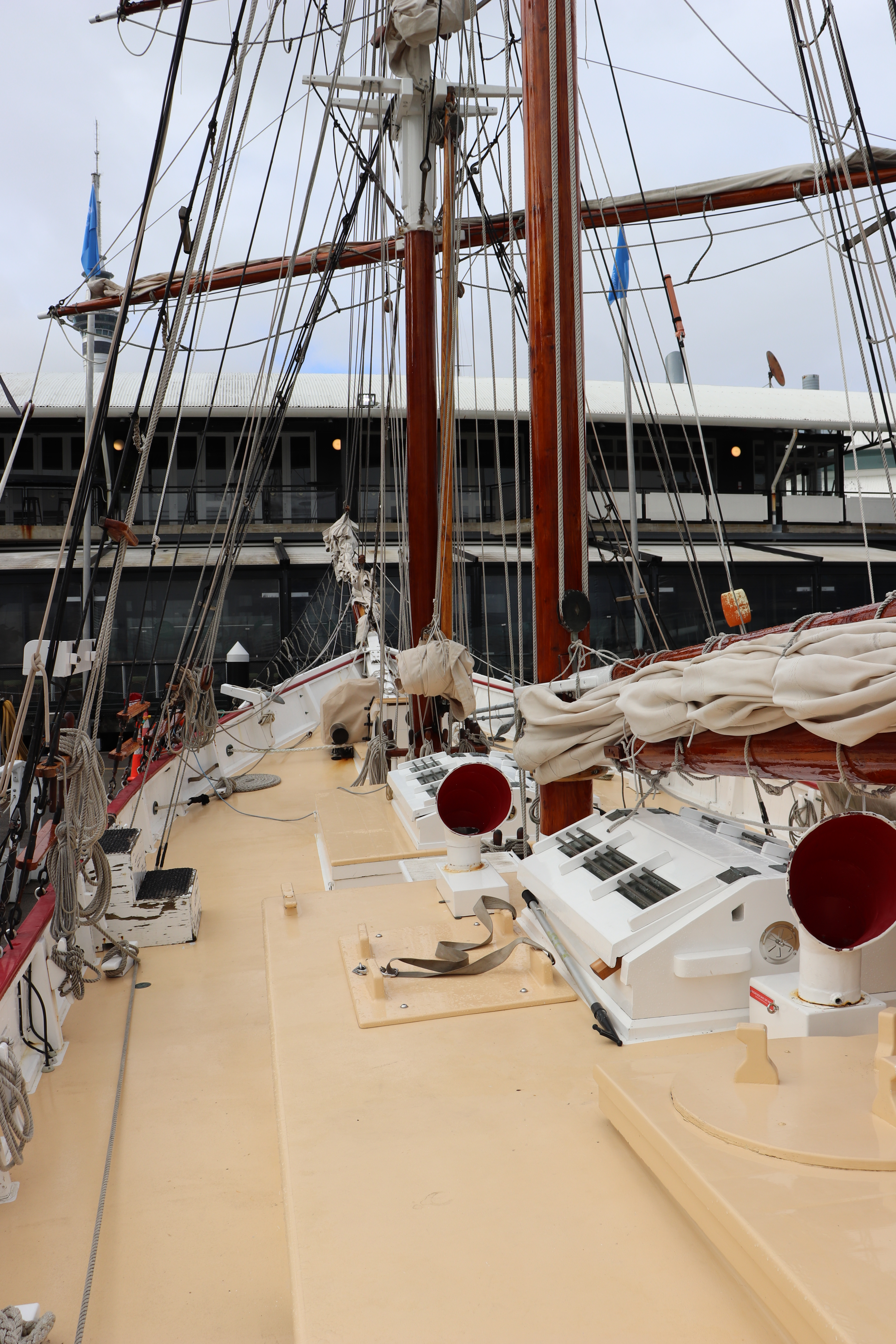
Deck of Breeze

== Media appearances ==
The Breeze was involved in a 1997 book launch incident when offense was taken to Michael Morrissey (writer)'s 'Terra Incognita' novel.

Breeze was used as a stand-in on television series Poenamo. Breeze, captained by Ron Blackman, makes an appearance in the TVNZ reality series Colonial House. It was filmed in 2002 in Lyttelton, and returned to Auckland after. The show was released in 2003. The show involved a family sailing to Lyttelton and carrying period possessions across the Bridle Path to Ferrymead in Christchurch, and then setting up a home and living in period role.

== See also ==
- Anti-nuclear protests
- Sinking of the Rainbow warrior

== Notes ==
- The Tall Ships Race is also referred to as the Tall Ships Regatta.
