= Breezy (disambiguation) =

Breezy is a 1973 American romantic drama film starring William Holden and Kay Lenz.

Breezy may also refer to:

== Nickname ==
- Muriel Bevis (1928–2002), outfielder and pitcher in the All-American Girls Professional Baseball League in 1950
- Breezy Bishop, longtime girls basketball coach at Western Senior High School in Baltimore, Maryland
- Chris Brown (born 1989), American singer
- Brianna Dotson, co-founder of Coco & Breezy, an American fashion accessory company
- B. Reeves Eason (1886–1956), American film director, actor, and screenwriter
- Breezy Johnson (born 1996), American alpine skier
- Floyd Reid (born 1927), American retired National Football League running back
- Breezy Rodio, Italian-American singer
- DJ Breezy (born 1990), Ghanaian songwriter

== Music ==
- Breezy (album), by Chris Brown, 2022
- "Breezy", a 2022 song by Meghan Trainor from Takin' It Back

== Other uses ==
- Breezies, characters in the My Little Pony toy franchise
- "Breezy", a television episode of Adventure Time
- Breezy (software), a distributed version control system which is a fork of GNU Bazaar
- RLU-1 Breezy, an experimental homebuilt aircraft
