= Thomas Breese =

American naval officer (1793–1846)

- Born: November 4, 1793; Newport, Rhode Island, U.S.
- Died: October 11, 1846 (aged 52); Cambridge, Massachusetts, U.S.
- Spouse: Lucy Marie Randolph (m. 1825)
- Children: Kidder Breese
- Relatives: Francis Malbone (uncle)
- Military career
- Allegiance: United States
- Branch: United States Navy
- Service years: 1811–1846
- Rank: Purser
- Conflicts: War of 1812; Second Barbary War

Thomas Breese (November 4, 1793 – October 11, 1846) was an American naval officer. Best known for his service under Oliver Hazard Perry during the 1813 Battle of Lake Erie, he served in the United States Navy for another 33 years, including as a paymaster for over two decades.

== Early life and family ==
Thomas Breese was born in Newport, Rhode Island, on November 4, 1793, the son of a British Army officer, Major John Breese (1738–1799), and Elizabeth Malbone (1755–1832). His mother was the daughter of Colonel Francis Malbone (1727–1785), one of Newport's wealthiest shipping merchants, and Margaret Saunders (1730–1775). Major John Breese was among the officers stationed at the Francis Malbone House when the British occupied it during the Revolutionary War. While there, he fell in love with the Malbones' daughter, Elizabeth. He returned to England after the war, resigned his commission and returned to Newport to marry her and take up the position of British vice consul at Newport.

John and Margaret Breese had eight children, of whom Thomas was the youngest son. Newport was a small, close-knit seagoing community, with numerous longstanding ties among its families. The Breeses and Wickhams were members of Newport's Trinity Church (Episcopal), as was the family of Breese's future mentor and patron, Oliver Hazard Perry. Both Breese and Perry were baptized at Trinity as young boys. Their lifelong connection was characteristic of the clannishness that was a feature of the early naval service.

John died when Thomas was six and, despite the Malbones' wealth and connections, he began working at a young age to help support his mother and siblings. He was first employed at T & W Wickham Company, a New York-based shipping company owned by a member of the Newport Wickham family. After the Embargo of 1807 gradually bankrupted Wickham's business, Breese was forced to return to Newport.

== Naval career ==
Breese had long been infatuated with life at sea and he eventually asked Oliver Hazard Perry for an appointment as his personal clerk. Perry was in command of a flotilla of ships at Newport when the War of 1812 began. Early in 1813, Perry received orders to go to the Great Lakes. Almost 150 sailors from the Newport area, including Thomas Breese, were sent there with him. The sailors made the arduous trip to Presque Isle, Pennsylvania, on the shore of Lake Erie, in February and March 1813.

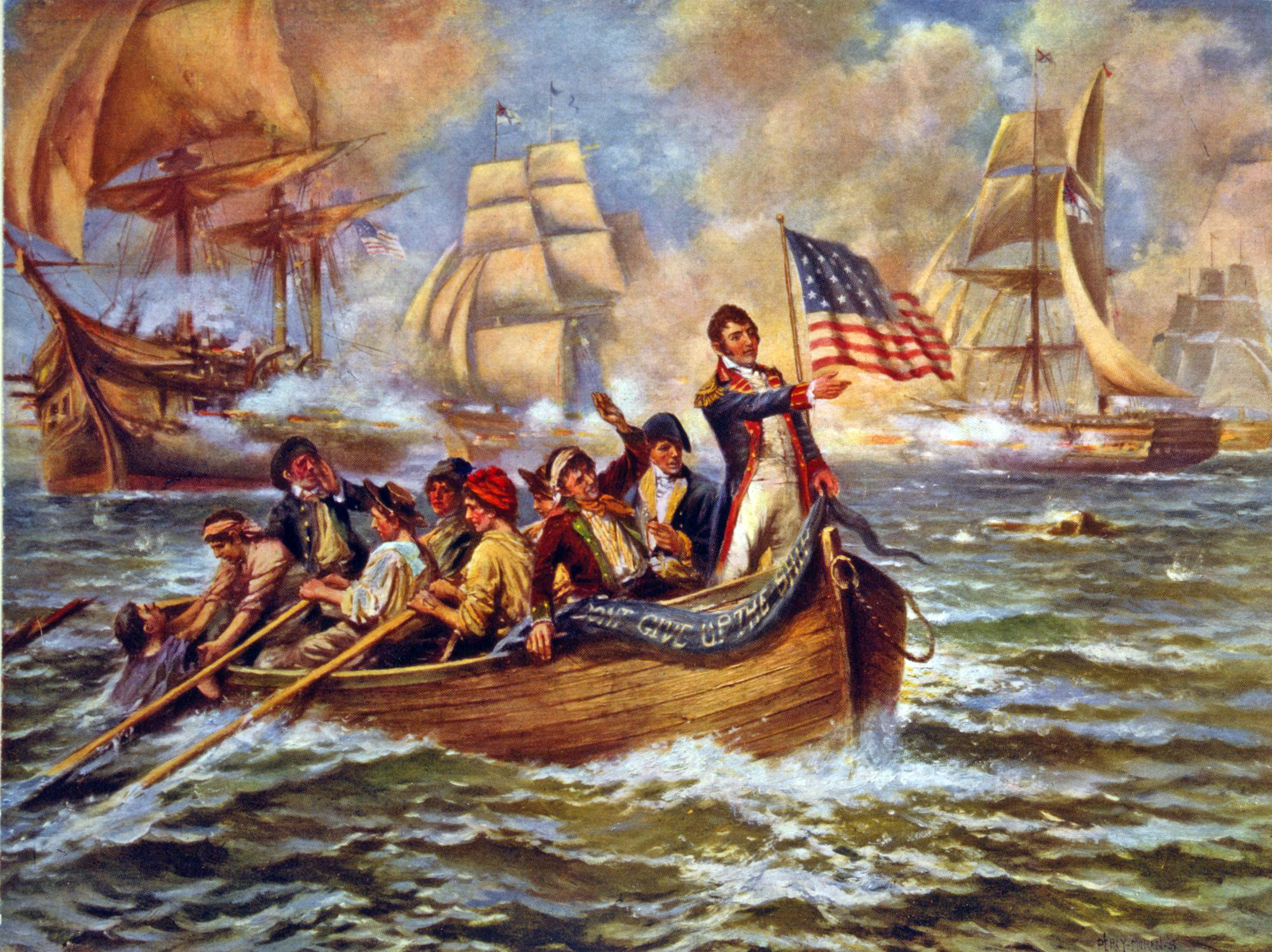
Perry departing the Lawrence in a 1911 painting by Edward Percy Moran with sailors who could row the boat.

From March through August of that year, Breese served as Perry's clerk while the Lake Erie fleet was built and prepared for battle, and his signature appears on letters he wrote for Perry. He was eventually appointed the fleet's chaplain, which gave him a higher salary and a berth with the officers on board ship. During the ensuing naval battle with the British, Breese served as the commander's aide, along with Perry's younger brother, James. During the combat, Breese was assigned to Perry's flagship, the USS Lawrence. The Battle of Lake Erie, sometimes called the Battle of Put-in-Bay, was fought on 10 September 1813. Thomas assisted in firing the last operational gun on the Lawrence before it went down. He was also likely one of the officers who rowed the longboat that carried Perry roughly a half mile (0.8 km) when the sinking of the Lawrence forced him to transfer his command to the USS Niagara. Many paintings show Perry's brother James in the boat too.

After the battle, Breese, as chaplain, was responsible for conducting the services for those who had died. Using the rites of the Episcopal Book of Common Prayer, he presided over the September 11 burial of common seamen in Lake Erie. The following day, the American and British officers were buried together at Put-in-Bay. Breese was listed as a chaplain in the ship's record, but he served as both chaplain and clerk, which was an official rating of the United States Navy beginning in 1794. Clerks for commanders of naval vessels were termed the captain's clerk.

Breese received a share of the prize money allotted to the crew; he directed that the money (which amounted to over $1200, equivalent to nearly $24,000 in 2025) be sent to his mother in Newport. Along with other officers, he was also given a medal and a sword for his role, and a promotion. Becoming a purser, his new rank, required serving at least one year as a captain's clerk, helping with the captain's correspondence and records. Between his time with Perry at Newport and the nine months on Lake Erie, Breese had fulfilled this requirement. The purser had charge of the stores and accounts on board ship. He was stationed at Boston when his new commission became effective on July 8, 1815.

During the Second Barbary War, Breese served in the Mediterranean under Perry on the frigate Java. After the conclusion of that war and until 1825, Breese served mainly aboard the USS Constitution. In 1825, he was appointed navy paymaster in Newport, a post he held to the end of his career. A drinking song, "Here's a health to thee, Tom Breese," written in 1830 and dedicated to him, became popular among sailors.

== Personal life and death ==
In Newport, on May 25, 1825, Thomas Breese married Lucy Marie Randolph, daughter of Richard K. Randolph, a nephew of future president William Henry Harrison. Among the Breeses' children was Kidder Breese, who also became a respected naval officer.

Thomas Breese died October 11, 1846, in Cambridge, Massachusetts. He is buried in Island Cemetery in Newport.

== Naval assignments ==
Thomas Breese naval assignments:

- 1812 – Newport Frigate Revenge – Clerk to O. H. Perry
- 1813 – Battle of Lake Erie – Captain's Clerk / Chaplain / Captain's Aid during Battle
- 1814–1817 Frigate Java – Captain's Clerk to O. H. Perry
- 1820 – Not on duty – Purser
- 1821–1823 Frigate USS Constitution – Purser
- 1824 – Frigate USS Constitution – Purser – ship stationed in Mediterranean
- 1825 – Frigate USS Constitution – Purser – on leave of absence
- 1825–1846 Newport Torpedo Station – Purser – Paymaster
- 1918 – Frigate USS Constitution – Purser
- 1919 – Frigate USS Constitution – Purser

== General references ==
- Altoff, Gerard T. (November 1988). "War of 1812: Leathernecks on Lake Erie". Leatherneck. Vol. 71, no. 11. pp. 36–43. ProQuest 206509291.
- Altoff, Gerard T. (1999). Oliver Hazard Perry and the Battle of Lake Erie. Put-in-Bay, OH: The Perry Group. ISBN 978-1887794039.
- Budd, Richard M. (2002). Serving Two Masters: The Development of American Military Chaplaincy, 1860–1920. University of Nebraska Press. ISBN 0803213220. Also: ISBN 978-0803213227
- Cooper, James Fenimore (1839). History of the navy of the United States of America. New York: G.P. Putnam.
- Dillon, Richard (1978). We have met the enemy: Oliver Hazard Perry, wilderness commodore. McGraw-Hill. ISBN 978-0-07-016981-4.
- Dobbins, W. W. History of the battle of Lake Erie (September 10, 1813,) and reminiscences of the flagship "Lawrence,".
- Lossing, Benson John (1976). The Pictorial Fieldbook of the War of 1812: A facsimile of the 1869 edition with a foreword by John T. Cunningham. Somerworth, NH: New Hampshire Publishing Company. ISBN 0-912274-31-X.
- Mackenzie, Alexander Slidell. The Life of Commodore Oliver Hazard Perry. Vol. 1.
- Mahan, Alfred Thayer (1905). Sea Power in Its Relation to the War of 1812. Boston: Little Brown.
- Mason, George Champlin (1894). Annals of Trinity Church, Newport, Rhode Island. Vol. 2. Newport, Rhode Island: Trinity Church.
- The New England Historical and Genealogical Register. Vol. 17. New England Historical & Genealogical Register. 1863. pp. 21–3.; contains a verbatim excerpt on Breese/Breeze from Parsons' Brief Sketches.
- Niagara (Pamphlet). Erie, Pennsylvania: Flagship Niagara. 1990.
- Niles, John M. (1821). The Life of Oliver Hazard Perry (2nd ed.). Hartford: O. D. Cooke.
- Pleadwell, F. L. (October 1922). "The Military Surgeon: Usher Parsons (1788-1868), Surgeon, United States Navy". Journal of the Association of Military. 51 (4).
- Rosenberg, M. (1997). The Building of Perry's Fleet on Lake Erie: 1812–1813. Harrisburg: Pennsylvania Historical and Museum Commission.
- Severance, Frank H. (1905). "The Dobbins Papers". Publications of the Buffalo Historical Society. VIII. Buffalo Historical Society. OCLC 17311624.
- Skaggs, David Curtis; Altoff, Gerard T. (1997). A Signal Victory: The Lake Erie Campaign, 1812–1813. Annapolis, Maryland: Naval Institute Press. ISBN 978-1-55750-892-8.
- Skaggs, David Curtis (October 2006). Oliver Hazard Perry: honor, courage, and patriotism in the early U.S. Navy. Annapolis, Maryland: Naval Institute Press. ISBN 978-1-59114-792-3. Also: ISBN 1-59114-792-1.
- Letter from Thomas Breese to his Mother dated September 12, 1812. (Breese descendants' private collection)
