= Breeze Energy =

Former British retail electricity and gas supplier

- Company type: Private limited company
- Industry: Electricity and gas supply
- Founded: 2015
- Defunct: 2019
- Headquarters: Newcastle, UK
- Area served: United Kingdom
- Key people: Danny Hughes Kelly Hughes
- Products: Gas Electricity

Breeze Energy was a UK-based retail electricity and gas supplier specialising in sustainable energy. It was established in April 2015, and supplied 18,000 customers. It was one of over 70 smaller energy companies competing with the "Big Six energy suppliers" which hold a large market share in the UK market. Breeze Energy ceased trading in December 2019, and British Gas was appointed by Ofgem to take over the customer base through the Supplier of Last Resort (SoLR) process. Prior to failure, Breeze Energy were ranked by Citizens Advice Bureau top for customer service in their quarterly report.

== Closure ==
In December 2019, Ofgem ordered Breeze Energy to pay £486,232.06 in Renewable Obligation taxes after it failed to demonstrate it had sourced enough electricity from renewable sources. British Gas was appointed by Ofgem as the Supplier of Last Resort (SoLR) for the 18,000 Breeze Energy customers.
