= Samuel Breeze =

Samuel Breeze (1772–1812) was a Welsh Baptist minister. He grew up in the Llandinam area. He began his career as schoolmaster of Dolau School, Radnorshire, but left in 1794 to take charge of Penrhyncoch School, near Aberystwyth.

In 1795 he also began to preach. He was ordained a Baptist minister on 12 June 1803, serving as one of two ministers in the Aberystwyth district for a number of years, before relocating to Newcastle Emlyn in March 1812.

He died in 1812, and was buried at Cilfowyr, Pembrokeshire.
