= Chic Breese =

Australian rules footballer

Personal information
- Full name: Robert Charles Breese
- Born: 21 March 1872; Brunswick, Victoria
- Died: 20 May 1929 (aged 57); Ascot Vale, Victoria
- Original team: Ascot Vale

Playing career^{1}
Years	Club	Games (Goals)
1897–98	Carlton	24 (10)
- ^{1} Playing statistics correct to the end of 1898.

Robert Charles "Chic" Breese (21 March 1872 – 20 May 1929) was an Australian rules footballer who played with Carlton in the Victorian Football League (VFL).
