= Breeze Creek =

Stream in Tuolumne County, California, U.S.

Coordinates: 37°58′42″N 119°39′01″W

Breeze Creek is a stream in Tuolumne County, California, United States.

Breeze Creek was named for William F. Breeze for his assistance in creating a map of the area.

== See also ==
- List of rivers of California
