= Breeze (app) =

Dutch online dating app

- Release: 2020; 6 years ago
- Type: Online dating
- Website: breeze.social

Breeze is a Dutch mobile app for online dating. It was launched in 2020.

== History ==
Breeze launched in the Netherlands in 2020. It was created by a group of university students. It won an investment from the Dutch version of Dragons' Den.

Breeze launched in Brussels in 2023. It expanded to London and Berlin in 2024 and New York City in 2025.

As of 2026, Breeze operates in 6 countries and 94 cities. It has over 2 million downloads, and has arranged over 737,000 dates. According to The Independent, Breeze is the third most popular dating app in the Netherlands, behind Bumble and Tinder.

== Operation ==
Breeze allows users to create profiles with their photos and basic details such as education, gender identity and disabilities. Users can provide additional information such as date preferences and locations. Users can also join "matching pools" which match users based on shared interests, which can range from hobbies to more niche interests.

Each day, Breeze provides users with up to 20 possible matches at 7 am and 7 pm. Users who match successfully are required to provide their availability. The app then arranges a date at one of Breeze's partner venues, or a "walk and talk" at a specified location. Users are required to pay upfront for a date, and are penalised for cancelling or rescheduling dates repeatedly. In-app messaging is prohibited until four hours before the date starts. Breeze co-founder Marco van der Woude said the app relies on the payments made for arranged dates rather than subscriptions or advertising revenue to make money.

Breeze co-founder Marsha Goei said, "There is a lot of choice paralysis in dating, with certain apps making it so easy to always look for the next match and look for something else. I feel like this abundance makes for a very toxic culture. In human interactions you have in real life, you wouldn't just ghost someone — but somehow, over the years, it became okay to do it online. If we make these apps or technologies more human-centred, then it's a lot healthier for everyone."

== Reception ==
Glamour magazine named Breeze the "Best dating app for offline dates" in 2026.

In June 2026, Isabella Silvers of The Daily Telegraph gave Breeze an overall score of 9/10, praising it for what she characterised as its "intentionality" in setting up dates. She added, "the app's best feature can also be its most frustrating – when I forgot to submit my date availability in time, my account was frozen for a week and the customer support chat was less than understanding." She criticized its notifications as "guilt-inducing", and concluded, "Overall, Breeze is a welcome disruptor in the dating app landscape, if not the most forgiving."
