= Kidder Breese =

Captain Kidder Randolph Breese
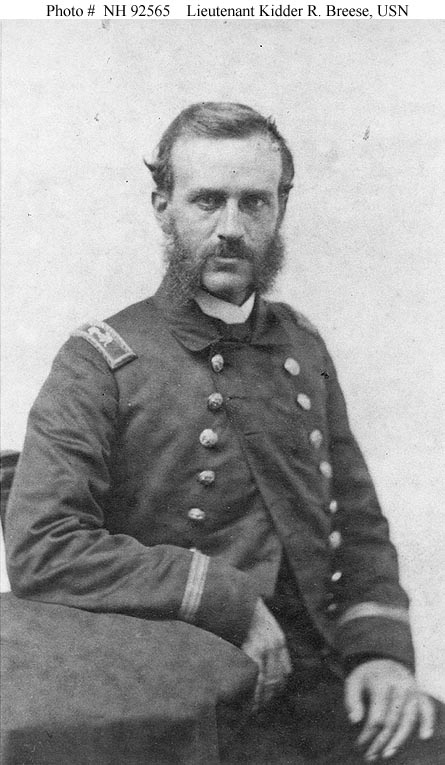
- Lieutenant Kidder R. Breese, USN
- Born: April 14, 1831; Philadelphia
- Died: September 13, 1881 (aged 50); Newport, Rhode Island
- Relatives: Thomas Breese
- Military career
- Allegiance: United States of America
- Branch: United States Navy
- Service years: 1846–1881
- Rank: Captain
- Commands: USS Black Hawk; Third Division, Mortar Flotilla, Mississippi Squadron; USS Plymouth; Commandant of Midshipmen; USS Pensacola
- Conflicts: Mexican–American War; American Civil War

Captain Kidder Randolph Breese USN (14 April 1831 – 13 September 1881) was an officer in the United States Navy during the Mexican–American War and the American Civil War.

== Early life and career ==
Born in Philadelphia, Pennsylvania, Breese was appointed a U.S. Navy midshipman in November 1846 and served in the sloop of war Saratoga during the remainder of the war with Mexico. Sea duty continued until October 1851, when he was assigned to the Naval Academy to prepare for examination. Warranted a passed midshipman in June 1852, Breese took part in Commodore Matthew C. Perry's expedition to Japan for the next three years.

In mid-1855, while serving with the United States Coast Survey, he was promoted to the ranks of master and lieutenant. He served in the sloop of war Preble in 1858 and 1859, during the Paraguay Expedition, and off Panama. Lieutenant Breese's next duties were as an officer of the sloop of war Portsmouth, off Africa, in 1860, and of the steamer San Jacinto from mid-1860 until late 1861.

== Civil War service ==
While he was serving on the San Jacinto, the Civil War began. He was present when she stopped the British steamship RMS Trent and removed two Confederate agents, an incident that provoked a brief crisis in U.S. relations with Great Britain, known as the Trent Affair.

From late 1861 Breese commanded part of the flotilla of mortar schooners that helped capture New Orleans in April 1862.

Promoted to lieutenant commander in mid-1862, he served with Rear Admiral David Dixon Porter on the Mississippi River and off the United States East Coast for most of the rest of the conflict, distinguishing himself during the Siege of Vicksburg, commanding 2,000 sailors and Marines in the successful land assault on Fort Fisher, and as Porter's Fleet Captain.

== Post-war service ==
After the war, Breese held various commands both afloat and ashore. Beginning in September 1865, Breese spent a year as Assistant to the Naval Academy's Superintendent, achieving the rank of commander while in that post.

During the later 1860s and into 1870 he served on Navy boards and had ordnance duty at the Washington Navy Yard, Washington, D.C. In 1870–1872 he commanded the steam sloop Plymouth in European waters.

He was Inspector of Ordnance at New Orleans for several months in 1872–1873, followed by two years as Commandant of Midshipmen at the Naval Academy, and as Inspector of Hydrography. Breese was promoted to captain in 1874.

From mid-1875 until early 1879 he commanded the Torpedo Station at Newport, Rhode Island, and had special ordnance duty. He was Commanding Officer of the steam sloop Pensacola, the Pacific Squadron flagship, in 1879 and 1880 and, in 1881, was a member of the Board of Harbor Commissioners.

Breese died at Newport, Rhode Island, on 13 September 1881. He is buried in the Island Cemetery in Newport.

== Legacy ==
The United States Navy has honored Breese's memory in several ways. The destroyer Breese (DD-122) was named for him, as was a street at the Washington Navy Yard.
