= Breeze Lake =

Lake in the state of California, United States

- Location within California Location within the United States
- Location: Madera County, California
- Coordinates: 37.576°N 119.392°W

Breeze Lake is a lake in Yosemite National Park, United States.

Breeze Lake was named for William F. Breeze for his assistance in creating a map of the area.

== See also ==
- List of lakes in California
