= Breezy (software) =

Source version control software (2017-)

- Original authors: Canonical and Bazaar/Breezy community
- Developers: Martin Packman, Jelmer Vernooij
- Initial release: 25 May 2017; 8 years ago
- Stable release: 3.3.21 / 3 February 2026
- Written in: Python, Cython (optional)
- Operating system: Cross-platform
- Type: Distributed and Client–server revision control system
- License: GPLv2 or later
- Website: www.breezy-vcs.org
- Repository: github.com/breezy-team/breezy

Breezy (brz) is a distributed and client–server revision control system. It is a fork of GNU Bazaar (formerly Bazaar-NG, bzr) system.

Breezy brings features like Python 3 and Git support to the Bazaar-based codebase. Many plugins are also merged in as an integral part of the fork.
