= Ben Breeze =

English-Welsh rugby union player

- Born: Ben Breeze; 8 April 1974 (age 52) Exeter, Devon
- Height: 5 ft 11 in (1.80 m)
- Weight: 13 st 0 lb (83 kg)
- University: Loughborough University
- Occupation: Chief Community Officer

Rugby union career
- Position: Wing / Fullback
Senior career
Years	Team	Apps	(Points)
1995–1999	Bristol	57	(60)
1999–2003	Newport RFC	77	(140)
2003–2006	Newport Gwent Dragons	56	(50)
2006–2010	Exeter Chiefs	40	(75)
International career
Years	Team	Apps	(Points)
2001	Wales A		
National sevens teams
Years	Team		Comps
- England
2002–2003	Wales		

Ben Breeze (born 8 April 1974 in Exeter) is an English born rugby union player who represented England U21, England Students and England 7's, as well as Wales A and Wales 7's. A winger or fullback, he played his club rugby for Bristol (1995–1999), Newport RFC (1999–2003), Newport Gwent Dragons (2003–2006) and Exeter Chiefs (2006–2010).

== Rugby career ==
On 25 March 2016 he coached and played for Rwanda at the GFI Rugby Tens in Hong Kong, technically making him a triple international.

Breeze now heads up Stephen Lansdown's "Bristol Sport Foundation", having reformed the Bristol Rugby Community Foundation in 1996, restructuring it as a charity in 2010.

In 2015, he was presented with a ten-year Special Achievement Award by Premiership Rugby and All Party Parliamentary Group at the Houses of Parliament.
