= Edward Y. Breese =

Edward Y. Breese (1912–1979) was a popular fiction writer, under the names Brett Halliday, Zane Grey, Ned Buller, Edward Buller or Y.B.

Edward was born in 1912 in Trenton, New Jersey. He graduated from Princeton University in 1934. Later he was an aerial gunner in World War II. After his return from the war he worked at a variety of jobs in Florida and Georgia.

At the age of 40 he began his writing career, concentrating on non-fiction articles in a variety of magazines. In 1966 he began writing and selling fiction stories to pulp magazines such as Ellery Queen's Mystery Magazine, Alfred Hitchcock's Mystery Magazine, Mike Shayne Mystery Magazine, and the Zane Grey Western Magazine.

He died in Miami, Florida in 1979, at the age of 67.

== Writings ==
(from Fiction Mags Index)

- Absolutely, Mr. Marko - Positively, Mr. Smith, (ss) Mike Shayne Mystery Magazine Mar 1968
- Blind Lady Justice, (ss) Mike Shayne Mystery Magazine Feb 1969
- Just Another Perfect Crime, (ss) Mike Shayne Mystery Magazine Apr 1968
- Little Man with the Big Mouth [Johnny Hawk], (nv) Mike Shayne Mystery Magazine Mar 1970
- The Name of the Game Is Murder [as by Brett Halliday; Michael Shayne], (na) Mike Shayne Mystery Magazine Apr 1970
- Pied Piper Calling [Johnny Hawk], (ss) Mike Shayne Mystery Magazine Feb 1972
- Sweet Dreams—of Death [as by Brett Halliday; Michael Shayne], (na) Mike Shayne Mystery Magazine Feb 1972
- Two for One, (ss) Mike Shayne Mystery Magazine Jul 1969
