= Brees (surname) =

Brees is a surname. Notable people with the surname include:

- Drew Brees (born 1979), American football player
- Herbert J. Brees (1877–1958), American lieutenant general
- Orlo M. Brees (1896–1980), American newspaper editor, author, and politician
- Samuel Brees (c.1810–1865), New Zealand artist, surveyor and engineer
