= Breeze Center =

Shopping mall in Songshan, Taipei, Taiwan

- 微風廣場

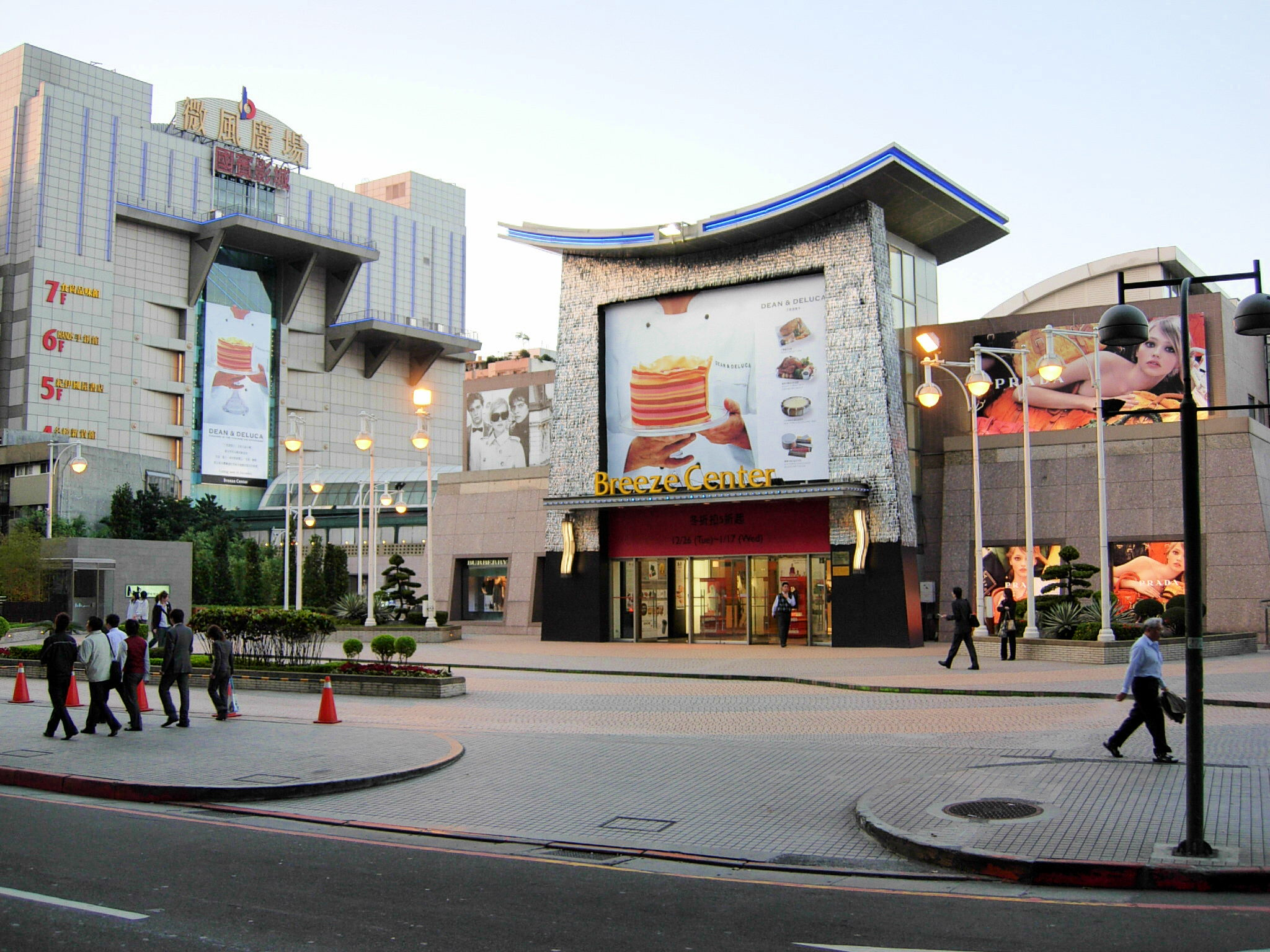
- Location: Songshan, Taipei, Taiwan
- Coordinates: 25°2′46.1″N 121°32′39.04″E
- Opened: 26 October 2001
- Manager: Henry Liao
- Owner: Breeze Development Co., Ltd.
- Website: www.breezecenter.com

Breeze Center (Chinese: 微風廣場; pinyin: Wéifēng Guǎngchǎng) is a shopping center in Songshan District, Taipei, Taiwan.

== History ==
The site was originally the production plants of HeySong Corporation. The shopping center began construction in 1998. The center was opened on 26 October 2001 by founder Paul Liao.

== Transportation ==
The shopping center is accessible within walking distance North from Zhongxiao Fuxing Station of the Taipei Metro.

== See also ==
- List of shopping malls in Taipei
