= USS Cleveland (CL-55) =

Cleveland class light cruiser

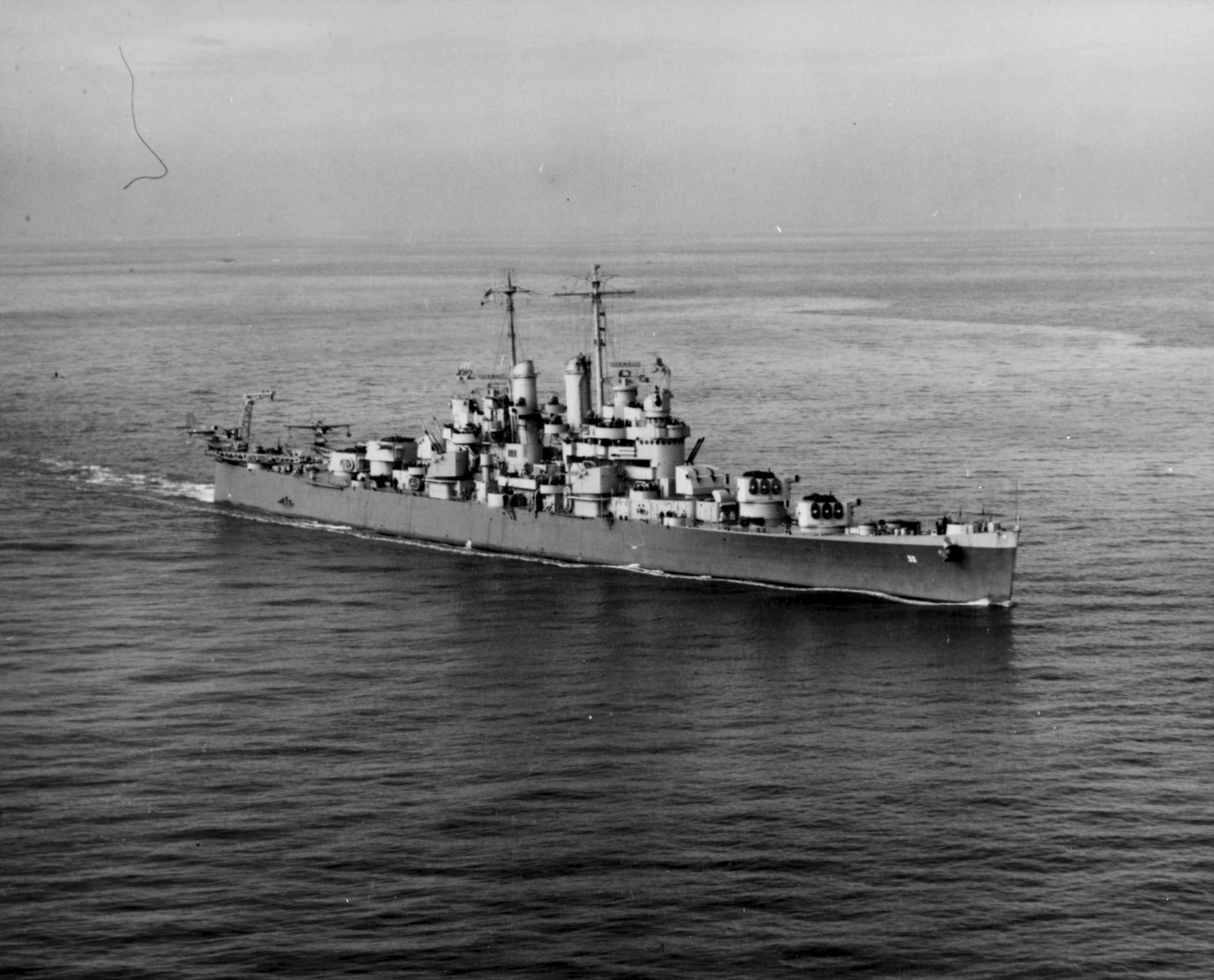
- USS Cleveland (CL-55), underway at sea in late 1942.

History

United States
- Name: Cleveland
- Namesake: City of Cleveland, Ohio
- Ordered: 17 May 1938
- Builder: New York Shipbuilding Corporation, Camden, New Jersey
- Laid down: 1 July 1940
- Launched: 1 November 1941
- Commissioned: 15 June 1942
- Decommissioned: 7 February 1947
- Stricken: 1 March 1959
- Fate: Sold for scrap 18 February 1960

General characteristics
- Class & type: Cleveland-class light cruiser
- Displacement: Standard: 11,744 long tons (11,932 t); Full load: 14,131 long tons (14,358 t)
- Length: 610 ft 1 in (185.95 m)
- Beam: 66 ft 4 in (20.22 m)
- Draft: 24 ft 6 in (7.47 m)
- Installed power: 4 × Babcock & Wilcox boilers; 100,000 shp (75,000 kW)
- Propulsion: 4 × steam turbines; 4 × screw propellers
- Speed: 32.5 knots (60.2 km/h; 37.4 mph)
- Range: 11,000 nmi (20,000 km; 13,000 mi) at 15 kn (28 km/h; 17 mph)
- Complement: 1,285 officers and enlisted
- Armament: 12 × 6 in (152 mm) Mark 16 guns; 12 × 5 in (127 mm)/38 caliber guns; 8 × 40 mm (1.6 in) Bofors anti-aircraft guns; 13 × 20 mm (0.79 in) Oerlikon anti-aircraft guns
- Armor: Belt: 3.5–5 in (89–127 mm); Deck: 2 in (51 mm); Barbettes: 6 in (152 mm); Turrets: 6 in (152 mm); Conning Tower: 5 in (127 mm)
- Aircraft carried: 4 × floatplanes
- Aviation facilities: 2 × stern catapults

USS Cleveland (hull number: CL-55) was the lead ship of the Cleveland-class light cruiser of the United States Navy, which were built during World War II. The class was designed as a development of the earlier Brooklyn-class cruisers, the size of which had been limited by the First London Naval Treaty. The start of the war led to the dissolution of the treaty system, but the dramatic need for new vessels precluded a new design, so the Clevelands used the same hull as their predecessors, but were significantly heavier. The Clevelands carried a main battery of twelve 6-inch (152 mm) guns in four three-gun turrets, along with a secondary armament of twelve 5 in (127 mm) dual-purpose guns. They had a top speed of 32.5 knots (60.2 km/h; 37.4 mph).

Cleveland was commissioned in June 1942, and saw extensive service in the war, briefly in the Atlantic, and then in the Pacific theater. Like almost all of her sister ships, she was decommissioned shortly after the end of the war, and never saw active service again. Cleveland was scrapped in the early 1960s.

== Design ==
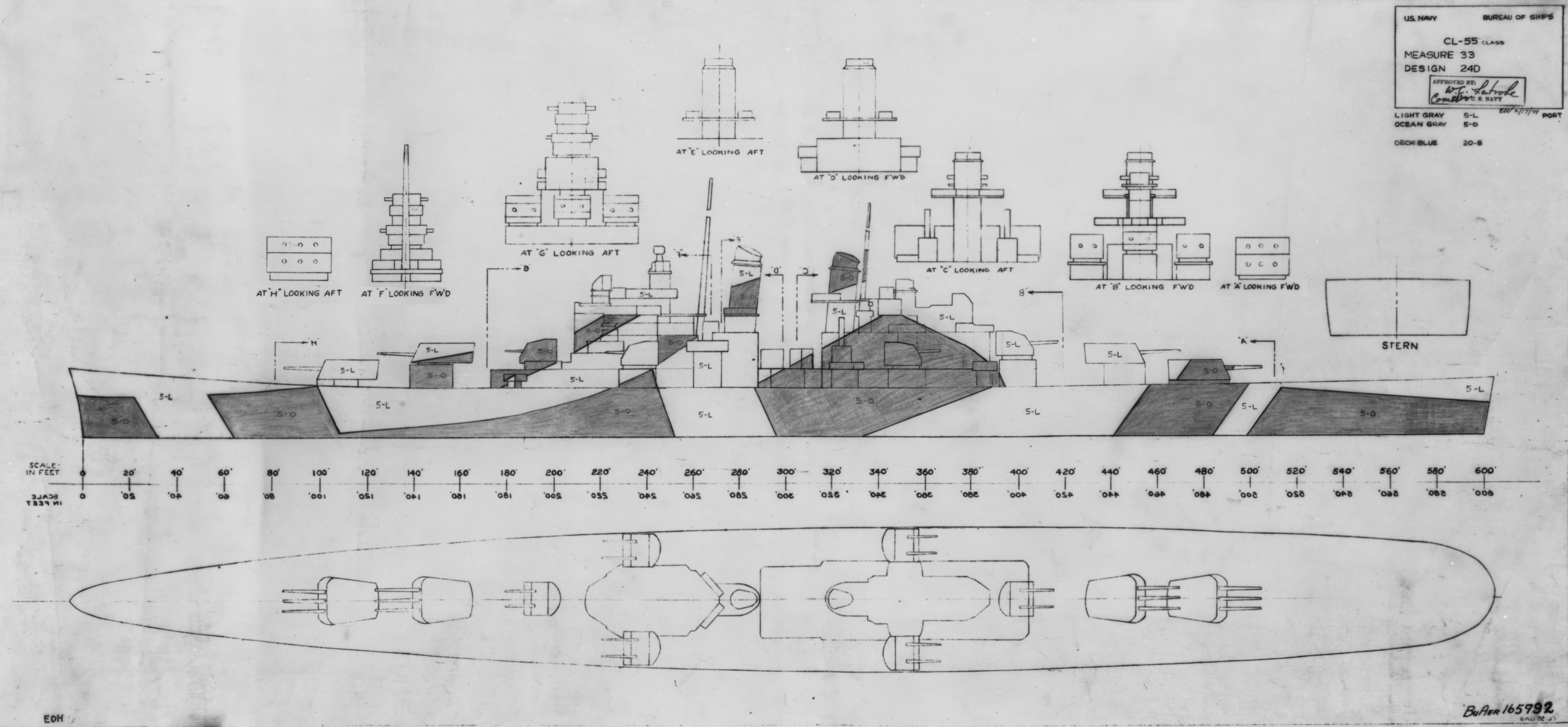
Depiction of the Cleveland class, showing the plan and profile

The Cleveland-class light cruisers traced their origin to design work done in the late 1930s; at the time, light cruiser displacement was limited to 8,000 long tons (8,100 t) by the Second London Naval Treaty. Following the start of World War II in September 1939, Britain announced it would suspend the treaty for the duration of the conflict, a decision the US Navy quickly followed. Though still neutral, the United States recognized that war was likely and the urgent need for additional ships ruled out an entirely new design, so the Clevelands were a close development of the earlier Brooklyn-class cruisers, the chief difference being the substitution of a two-gun 5 in (127 mm) dual-purpose gun mount for one of the main battery 6 in (152 mm) gun turrets.

Cleveland was 610 feet 1 inch (186 m) long overall and had a beam of 66 ft 4 in (20.22 m) and a draft of 24 ft 6 in (7.47 m). Her standard displacement amounted to 11,744 long tons (11,932 t) and increased to 14,131 long tons (14,358 t) at full load. The ship was powered by four General Electric steam turbines, each driving one propeller shaft, using steam provided by four oil-fired Babcock & Wilcox boilers. Rated at 100,000 shaft horsepower (75,000 kW), the turbines were intended to give a top speed of 32.5 knots (60.2 km/h; 37.4 mph). Her crew numbered 1285 officers and enlisted men.

The ship was armed with a main battery of twelve 6 in /47-caliber Mark 16 guns (Note: /47 refers to the length of the gun in terms of calibers. A /47 gun is 47 times long as it is in bore diameter.) in four 3-gun turrets on the centerline. Two were placed forward in a superfiring pair; the other two turrets were placed aft of the superstructure in another superfiring pair. The secondary battery consisted of twelve 5 in (127 mm) /38-caliber dual-purpose guns mounted in twin turrets. Two of these were placed on the centerline, one directly behind the forward main turrets and the other just forward of the aft turrets. Two more were placed abreast of the conning tower and the other pair on either side of the aft superstructure. Anti-aircraft defense consisted of eight Bofors 40 mm (1.6 in) guns in two quadruple mounts and thirteen Oerlikon 20 mm (0.79 in) guns in single mounts.

The ship's belt armor ranged in thickness from 3.5 to 5 in (89 to 127 mm), with the thicker section amidships where it protected the ammunition magazines and propulsion machinery spaces. Her deck armor was 2 in (51 mm) thick. The main battery turrets were protected with 6.5 in (170 mm) faces and 3 in (76 mm) sides and tops, and they were supported by barbettes 6 inches thick. Cleveland's conning tower had 5-inch sides.

== Service history ==
On 1 November 1941, Hull No. 423 was launched and christened Cleveland. Built by New York Shipbuilding Corporation of Camden, New Jersey, and sponsored by Mrs. H. Burton, Cleveland was commissioned on 15 June 1942, with Captain E. W. Burrough in command. Clearing Norfolk's Chesapeake Bay on 10 October 1942, Cleveland joined a task force off Bermuda (on 29 October) bound for the invasion of North Africa. Her firepower supported the landings at Fedhala, French Morocco on 8 November, and she remained on patrol until 12 November, returning to Norfolk on 24 November.

Cleveland sailed for the Pacific on 5 December 1942, and arrived at Efate Island on 16 January. Her first mission in the consolidation of the Solomon Islands was with Task Force 18 (TF 18) to guard a troop convoy to Guadalcanal from 27 to 31 January, Cleveland fired on the enemy as she came under heavy air attack in the Battle of Rennell Island on 29–30 January.

Joining TF 68, Cleveland steamed up "the Slot" on 6 March 1943 to bombard Japanese airfields at Vila on Kolombangara, then joined in the night action which sank the destroyers Minegumo and Murasame in the battle of Blackett Strait.

USS Cleveland (CL-55) shelling Japanese airfields on Buka Island, 24 December 1943.

Command of Cleveland passed to Captain Andrew G. Shepard in June. Still with TF 68, "Merrill's Marauders", Cleveland fired in the bombardment of the Shortland Islands on 30 June 1943 and provided gun support for the invasion landings at Munda, New Georgia on 12 July. Following a short repair period at Sydney, Australia, Cleveland sailed for the preinvasion bombardment of the Treasury Islands on 26–27 October. Her task force steamed to blast Buka Island and Bonis on 1 November in support of the troops invading Bougainville, dashed south the same day to neutralize bases in the Shortlands, and that night intercepted a Japanese force in the Battle of Empress Augusta Bay which was to win her a Navy Unit Commendation. Cleveland poured her radar-controlled fire into the four Japanese cruisers for over an hour, aiding in sinking Sendai, then chased the fleeing ships until daybreak. An air attack followed and one stick of bombs severely rocked Cleveland, who answered by splashing several of the enemy planes. She returned to Buka for another bombardment on 23 December, then patrolled between Truk and Green Island, Papua New Guinea from 13 to 18 February 1944 while American forces captured the latter.

After supporting the capture of Emirau Island from 17 to 23 March, Cleveland sailed for replenishment and repairs at Sydney, Australia, then returned to the Solomons on 21 April to prepare for the Marianas operation. One practice bombardment on 20 May brought return fire unexpectedly which straddled the ship, but unharmed, she quickly silenced the shore batteries.

From 8 June to 12 August, Cleveland participated in the Marianas operation. On 24 July, during the invasion of Tinian, Cleveland came to the aid of the destroyer Norman Scott. Norman Scott was hit six times within a few seconds by shore batteries. Cleveland maneuvered between Norman Scott and the shore batteries, preventing her from taking any more hits. She conducted softening-up bombardments and then gave fire support for invading troops until she joined TF 58 for the Battle of the Philippine Sea on 19–20 June. Although few enemy aircraft penetrated the screen of American carrier planes, Cleveland was credited with splashing at least one enemy aircraft and assisting in downing another of the few which did get through.

From 12 to 29 September, Cleveland participated in the invasion of the Palaus, then sailed from Manus Island on 5 October for a stateside overhaul. She arrived in Subic Bay on 9 February 1945, and sailed on to bombard Corregidor on 13–14 February, effectively neutralizing the fortress before the landings there. Continuing to support the consolidation of the Philippines, she covered the landings at Puerto Princesa, the Visayas, Panay, and the Malabang-Parang area on Mindanao.

Cleveland put out from Subic Bay on 7 June to act as part of the covering force and provide fire support for the invasion landings at Brunei Bay, Borneo on 10 June. She returned to Subic Bay on 15 June, then sailed to Manila to embark General of the Army Douglas MacArthur and his staff as observers of the assault on Balikpapan. Arriving on 30 June, she fired in a pre-landing bombardment the next morning, and after General MacArthur had made an inspection tour of the landing area, got underway for Manila, arriving on 3 July.

With a new cruiser task force, Cleveland sailed on 13 July to Okinawa, arriving on 16 July. From this base Task Force 95 made a series of sweeps against Japanese shipping until 7 August to ensure Allied control of the East China Sea. Cleveland got underway from Okinawa on 9 September to support the occupation of Japan by covering the evacuation of Allied prisoners of war from Wakayama, then serving as part of a naval occupation group until the 6th Army made its landings on Honshū. After a short stay in Tokyo Bay (28 October – 1 November), Cleveland sailed for Pearl Harbor, San Diego, the Panama Canal, and Boston, arriving on 5 December for overhaul. She operated out of Newport on various training exercises, including a Naval Reserve training cruise to Bermuda in April 1946 and Halifax, Nova Scotia, and Quebec in June 1946, before reporting to Philadelphia for inactivation. Cleveland was placed out of commission in reserve there on 7 February 1947, until sold for scrap, 18 February 1960.

== Awards ==
In addition to her Navy Unit Commendation, Cleveland received 13 battle stars for World War II service.
