= Aaron S. Merrill =

United States Navy admiral (1890–1961)

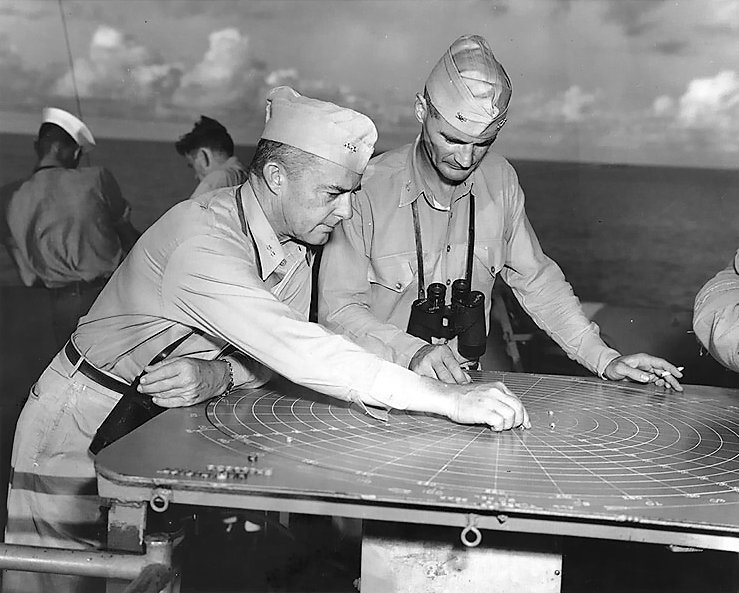
- Aaron S. Merrill and Captain W.D. Brown during operations in the Solomon Islands, December 23, 1943
- Born: March 26, 1890; Brandon Hall, Washington, Mississippi, U.S.
- Died: February 28, 1961 (aged 70); Natchez, Mississippi, U.S.
- Burial place: Natchez City Cemetery, Natchez, Mississippi, U.S. 31°33′N 91°23′W
- Military career
- Allegiance: United States of America
- Branch: United States Navy
- Service years: 1912–1947
- Rank: Vice Admiral
- Nickname: Tip
- Commands: USS Harvard (SP-209); USS Elcano (PG-38); USS Williamson (DD-244); USS Pensacola (CA-24); Destroyer Division Eight; USS Indiana (BB-58); Task Force 68; 8th Naval District; Gulf Sea Frontier
- Conflicts: World War I; World War II; Solomon Islands campaign; Battle of Guadalcanal; Bougainville campaign; Battle of Empress Augusta Bay
- Awards: Navy Cross; Legion of Merit; Order of the Crown (Belgium); Order of the Merit of Chile

Aaron Stanton Merrill (March 26, 1890 – February 28, 1961), also known as Tip Merrill, was an American rear admiral during World War II who led American naval forces during the Solomon Islands campaign and was the first admiral to solely use radar for fire control during wartime.

== Military career ==
=== 1912–1939 ===
After graduating from the United States Naval Academy in 1912, Merrill first served for several years in the Mediterranean Sea. He was assigned to the destroyer Aylwin (DD-47), based in Plymouth, England, during the last months of World War I. In 1919 he commanded the patrol craft Harvard (SP-209), based at Harwich, England.

In June 1935 Merrill was assigned to the heavy cruiser Pensacola (CA-24), and received the Order of the Crown from the Belgian Government, after conveying the remains of Paul May, the Belgian Ambassador to the United States, back to Antwerp.

In 1938–39 Merrill completed the senior course at the Naval War College, Newport, Rhode Island, and was promoted to captain. In 1939–1940 he commanded a destroyer division in the Pacific with the Somers (DD-381) as flagship.

=== World War II ===
Merrill was Professor of Naval Science and Tactics at Tulane University, until being assigned command of the battleship Indiana (BB-58) in April 1942. After promotion to rear admiral in January 1943, Merrill led a cruiser-destroyer task force participating in the Battle of Guadalcanal and later won distinction during the Bougainville campaign at the Battle of Empress Augusta Bay successfully defending ground forces against an assault by the Japanese fleet in a hard-fought night battle.

In March 1943, during the Solomon Islands campaign, he showed the usefulness of radar against enemy naval forces at the Battle of Blackett Strait. Merrill, commanding Task Force 68, engaged and destroyed two Japanese destroyers Murasame and Minegumo, using only radar fire control. For his efforts he received both the Legion of Merit and the Navy Cross.

Serving as Director of Office of Public Relations for the Navy Department from June 15, 1944, until April 23, 1945, Merrill joined a diplomatic delegation to meet with members of the Chilean government to discuss mutual defense policies in Santiago, Chile. While in attendance, Merrill's efforts to establish an American naval mission to Chile in place of the former British presence earned him the title of Grand Officer of the Order of Merit by Chile.

=== Post-war ===
In June 1946, after briefly serving for several months as commandant of the Eighth Naval District in New Orleans, Louisiana, Merrill assumed command of Gulf Sea Frontier, remaining in this post until being placed on the retired list in November 1947, eventually retiring a vice admiral. Moving first to Natchez, Mississippi and later to New Orleans following his retirement, Merrill lived with his wife until his death on February 28, 1961.

== Personal life ==
Admiral Merrill was born March 26, 1890, at Brandon Hall in Adams County, Mississippi, to parents Dunbar Surget Merrill and Charlotte Brandon Stanton. His 2nd great-grandfather was Gerard Chittocque Brandon, one of Mississippi's earliest governors. His grandfather, Ayres Phillips Merrill, was also once U.S. Minister to Belgium.

He inherited the nickname "Tip" from his great-grandfather, who garnered the moniker after fighting in the Battle of Tippecanoe. His father, Aaron Stanton, a Confederate soldier, was also known as "Tip".

Merrill married New York native, Louise Gautier Witherbee, on January 28, 1922; they remained together until his death in 1961.

== Awards ==
- Navy Cross
- Legion of Merit
- Mexican Service Medal
- World War I Victory Medal with star
- Yangtze Service Medal
- American Defense Service Medal with "FLEET" clasp
- American Campaign Medal
- Asiatic-Pacific Campaign Medal with four battle stars
- World War II Victory Medal
- Commander, Order of the Crown (Belgium)
- Grand Officer, Order of Merit (Chile)
