= Kula Gulf =

Waterway in the Western Province of the Solomon Islands

Coordinates: 8.035°S 157.267°E

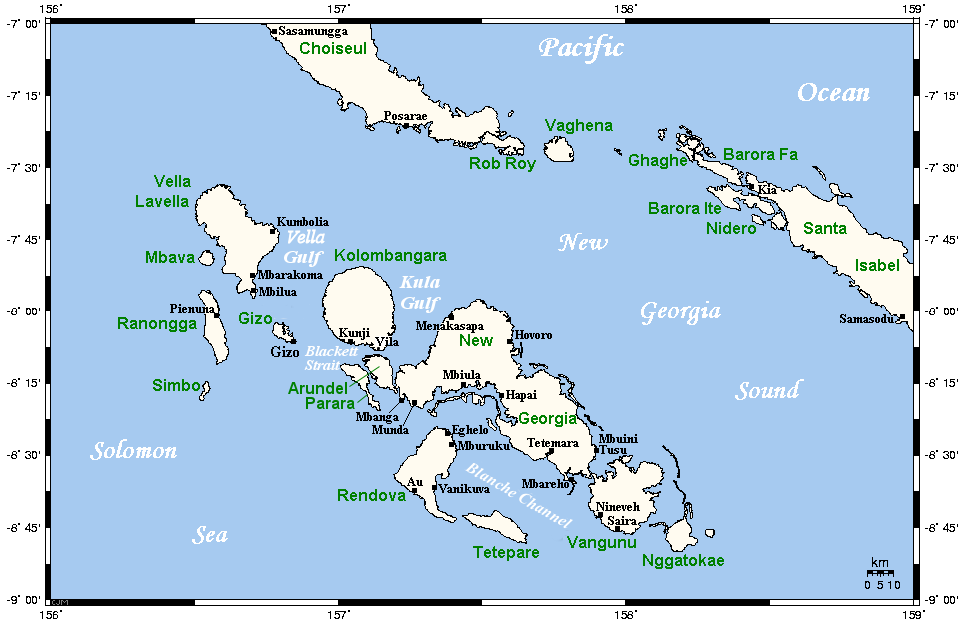
Kula Gulf separates the large round island (Kolombangara) from the larger, irregular island (New Georgia) to the southeast.

Kula Gulf is a waterway in the Western Province of the Solomon Islands. It lies between the islands of Kolombangara to the west, Arundel Island (Kohinggo) to the southwest, and New Georgia to the south and east. To the north, it opens into New Georgia Sound ("the Slot"). To the southwest, it connects via Blackett Strait to Vella Gulf and the Solomon Sea.

During the Solomon Islands campaign in World War II, two minor naval battles between the Imperial Japanese Navy and the United States Navy were fought here in July, 1943. The first was the Battle of Kula Gulf fought on the night of 5–6 July 1943. In that engagement, the cruiser USS Helena was sunk.

The second battle was the Battle of Kolombangara fought on the night of 12–13 July 1943. In that engagement, the destroyer USS Gwin and the Japanese cruiser Jintsū were sunk.
