= Blackett Strait =

Coordinates: 8°7′0″S 157°0′0″E

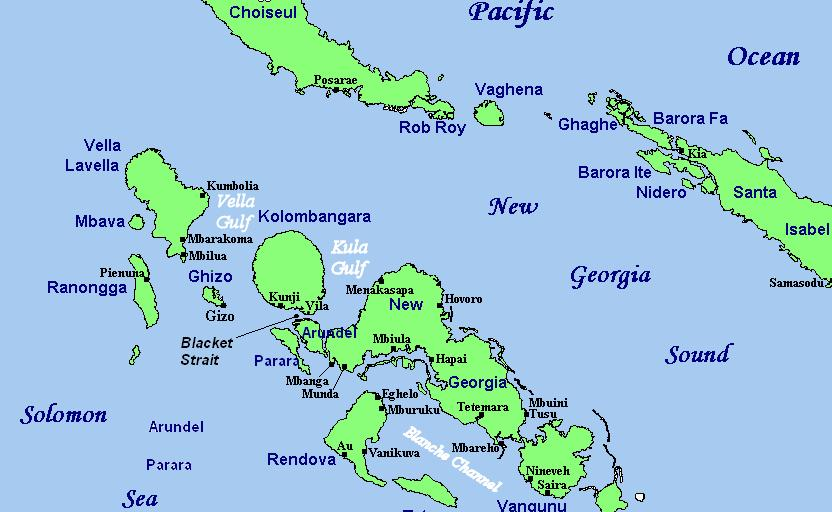
Blackett Strait separates the island of Kolombangara from Arundel to the south and Ghizo to the west.

Blackett Strait is a waterway in the Western Province of the Solomon Islands. It lies between the islands of Kolombangara to the north, and Arundel Island (Kohinggo) to the south. It connects Vella Gulf to the west with Kula Gulf to the east. It is almost certainly named after Lt. Frederick Arthur Blackett (1846–1880), the youngest son of Sir Edward Blackett 6th Bt., who served on HMS Thalia as part of the China Station from 1872 to 1873.

== Battle of Blackett Strait ==
During the Solomon Islands campaign in World War II, the Battle of Blackett Strait was fought here between the Imperial Japanese Navy and the United States Navy on the night of 5–6 March 1943.

== PT-109 ==
Another engagement occurred in Blackett Strait when a force of PT boats were sent to intercept the "Tokyo Express" supply convoy on 2 August. In what National Geographic called a "poorly planned and badly coordinated" attack, 15 boats with 60 available torpedoes went into action. However, of the 30 torpedoes fired, not a single hit was scored.

In that battle, only four PT boats (the section leaders) had radar, and they were ordered to return to base after firing their torpedoes on radar bearings. When they left, the remaining boats were virtually blind and without verbal orders, thus leading to more confusion.

Patrolling just after the section leader had departed for home, PT-109 (captained by John F. Kennedy) was run down on a dark moonless night by the Japanese destroyer Amagiri, returning from the supply mission. The PT boat had her engines at idle to hide her wake from seaplanes. Conflicting statements have been made as to whether the destroyer captain spotted and steered towards the boat. Members of the destroyer crew believed the collision was not an accident, though other reports suggest Amagiri's captain never realized what happened till after the fact.

The crew was assumed lost by the U.S. Navy, but they had been observed by Reg Evans, a coastwatcher, and were found some days later by Solomon Islander scouts dispatched by Evans in a dugout canoe, Biuku Gasa and Eroni Kumana.
