= USS Grampus (SS-207) =

Submarine of the United States

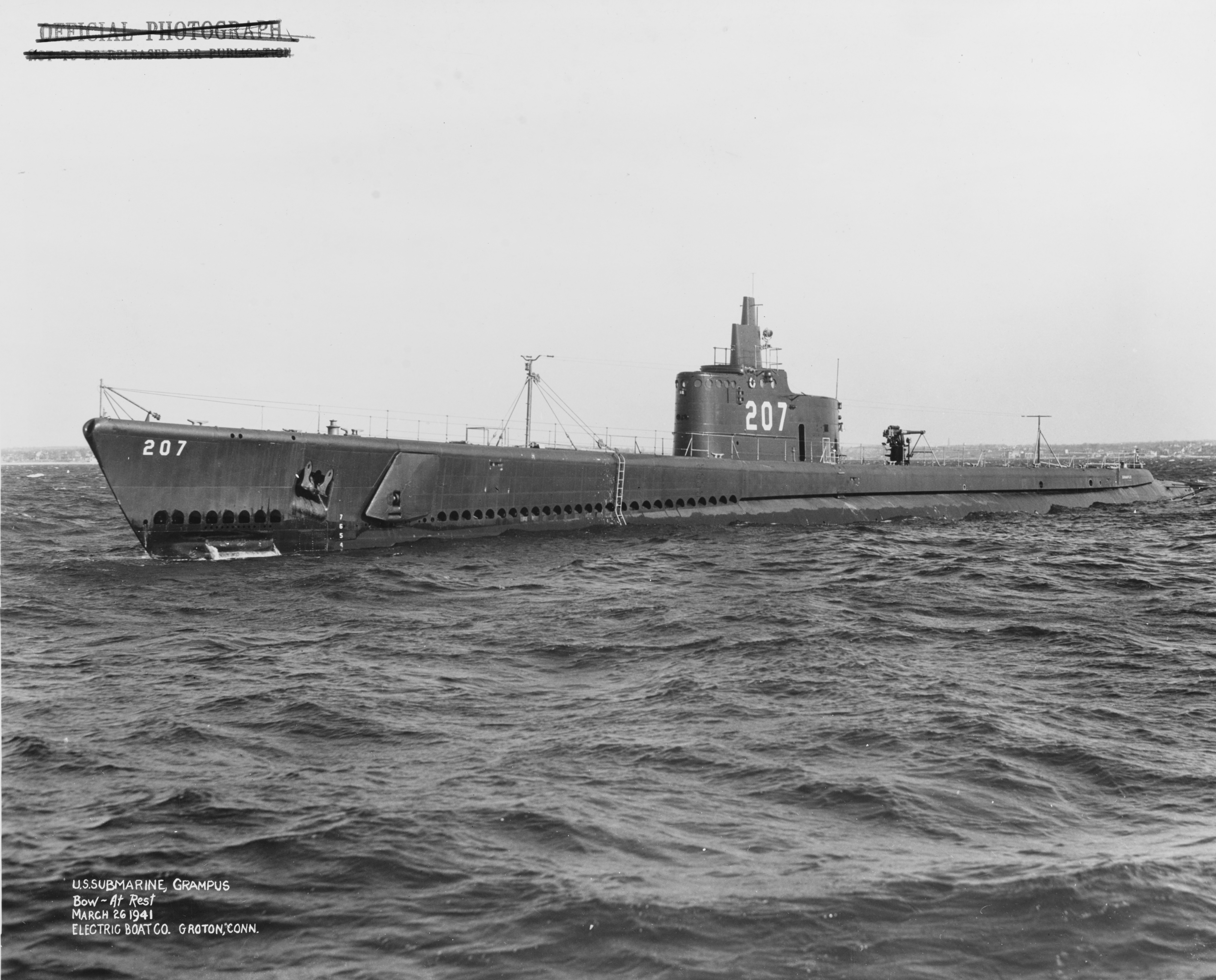
- Off Groton, Connecticut, while running trials, March 26, 1941

History

United States
- Builder: Electric Boat Company, Groton, Connecticut
- Laid down: February 14, 1940
- Launched: December 23, 1940
- Commissioned: May 23, 1941
- Stricken: June 21, 1943
- Fate: Possibly sunk by Japanese destroyers in Blackett Strait, March 5, 1943

General characteristics
- Class & type: Tambor-class diesel-electric submarine
- Displacement: 1,475 long tons (1,499 t) standard, surfaced; 2,370 tons (2,408 t) submerged
- Length: 307 ft 2 in (93.62 m)
- Beam: 27 ft 3 in (8.31 m)
- Draft: 14 ft 7 1/2 in (4.458 m)
- Propulsion: 4 × General Motors Model 16-248 V16 Diesel engines driving electric generators; 2 × 126-cell Sargo batteries; 4 × high-speed General Electric electric motors with reduction gears; two propellers; 5,400 shp (4.0 MW) surfaced; 2,740 shp (2.0 MW) submerged
- Speed: 20.4 knots (38 km/h) surfaced; 8.75 knots (16 km/h) submerged
- Range: 11,000 nautical miles (20,000 km) at 10 knots (19 km/h)
- Endurance: 48 hours at 2 knots (3.7 km/h) submerged
- Test depth: 250 ft (76 m)
- Complement: 6 officers, 54 enlisted
- Armament: 10 × 21-inch (533 mm) torpedo tubes; 6 forward, 4 aft; 24 torpedoes; 1 × 3-inch (76 mm) / 50 caliber deck gun; Bofors 40 mm and Oerlikon 20 mm cannon

USS Grampus (SS-207) was the eighth Tambor-class submarine to be commissioned in the United States Navy in the years leading up to the country's December 1941 entry into World War II. She was the sixth ship of the -United States Navy (USN) to be named for Grampus griseus, also known as Risso's dolphin, a member of the dolphin family Delphinidae. Her World War II service was in the Pacific Ocean. She completed five war patrols in the following 14 months, and is credited with sinking over 45,000 tons of Japanese merchant shipping and warships. She was declared lost with all hands in March 1943; of the 12 Tambor-class submarines, only five survived the war. She received three battle stars for her World War II service.

== Construction and commissioning ==
Grampus′s keel was laid down by the Electric Boat Company of Groton, Connecticut. She was launched on December 23, 1940, sponsored by Mrs. Clark H. Woodward, and commissioned on May 23, 1941 at New London, Connecticut.

== Operational history ==
=== Pacific ===
After shakedown in Long Island Sound, Grampus sailed to the Caribbean Sea with Grayback (SS-208) on September 8 to conduct a modified war patrol, returning to New London on September 28. The Japanese attack on Pearl Harbor found Grampus undergoing postshakedown overhaul at Portsmouth, New Hampshire, but soon ready for war on 22 December, she sailed for the Pacific, reaching Pearl Harbor on February 1, 1942, via the Panama Canal and Mare Island.

On her first war patrol from February 8, 1942 to April 4, 1942, Grampus sank an 8636-ton tanker Kaijo Maru No.2 on March 4, 1942, the only kill of her short career, and reconnoitered Kwajalein and Wotje atolls, later the scene of bloody but successful landings. Her second patrol to and third patrol from Fremantle, Australia, were marred by a heavy number of antisubmarine patrol craft off Truk Lagoon and poor visibility as heavy rains haunted her path along the Luzon and Mindoro coasts.

Taking aboard four coastwatchers, Grampus sailed from Fremantle on October 2, 1942, for her fourth war patrol. Despite the presence of Japanese destroyers, she landed the coast watchers on Vella Lavella and Choiseul islands while conducting her patrol. This patrol, during the height of the Guadalcanal campaign, took Grampus into waters teeming with Japanese men-of-war. She sighted a total of four enemy cruisers and 79 destroyers in five different convoys. Although she conducted a series of aggressive attacks on the Japanese ships, receiving 104 depth charges for her work, Grampus was not credited with sinking any ships. On October 18, 1942, Grampus even scored a direct hit on the Yura, but the torpedo failed to explode. She returned to Australia on November 23.

The boat's fifth war patrol, from December 14, 1942, to January 19, 1943, took her across access lanes frequented by Japanese submarines and other ships. Air and water patrol in this area was extremely heavy, and although she conducted several daring attacks on the 41 contacts she sighted, Grampus again was denied a kill.

== Sinking ==
In company with Grayback, Grampus departed Brisbane on February 11, 1943, for her sixth war patrol, from which she failed to return; the manner of her loss still remains a mystery. Japanese seaplanes reported sinking a submarine on February 18 in Grampus′s patrol area, but Grayback reported seeing Grampus in that same area on March 4. Grampus is believed to have damaged the Japanese merchant ship Keiyo Maru (6,442 GRT) on February 19 and the Japanese minesweeper W.22 on February 27, 1943. On March 5, 1943, the Japanese destroyers Minegumo and Murasame conducted an antisubmarine attack near Kolombangara island. A heavy oil slick was sighted there the following day, indicating that Grampus may have been lost there in a night attack or gun battle against the destroyers. The Japanese destroyers had by then already been sunk in the Battle of Blackett Strait, a night action with U.S. light cruisers and destroyers.

When repeated attempts failed to contact Grampus, the submarine was declared missing and presumed lost with all hands. Her name was struck from the Naval Vessel Register on June 21, 1943.

== See also ==
- John R. Craig
