= USS Denver (CL-58) =

Light cruiser of the United States Navy

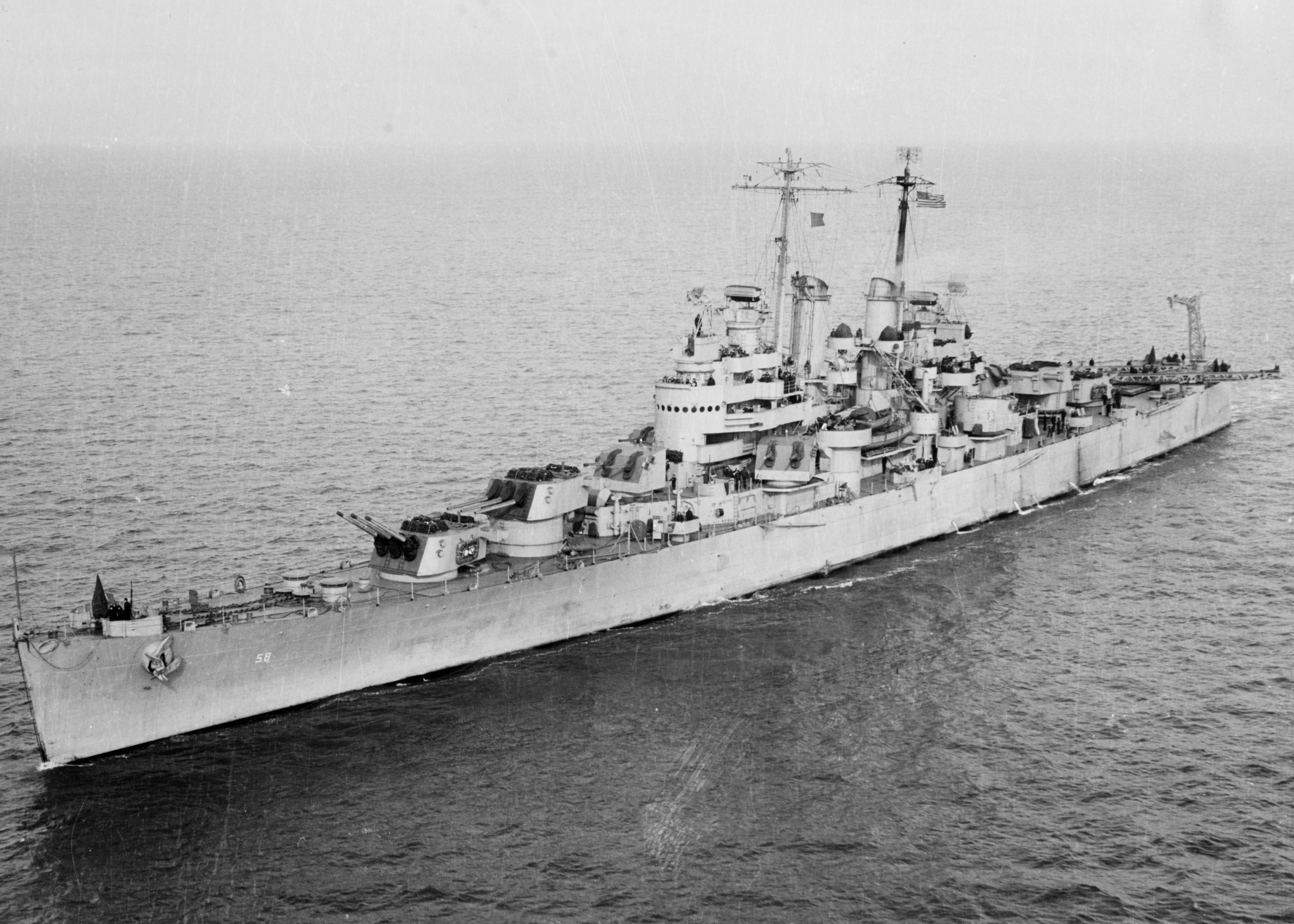
- USS Denver (CL-58) c. December 1942

History

United States
- Name: Denver
- Namesake: City of Denver, Colorado
- Builder: New York Shipbuilding Corporation, Camden, New Jersey
- Laid down: 26 December 1940
- Launched: 4 April 1942
- Sponsored by: Miss L. J. Stapleton
- Commissioned: 15 October 1942
- Decommissioned: 7 February 1947
- Stricken: March 1959
- Identification: Hull symbol:CL-58; Code letters:NADG
- Honors and awards: 11 × battle stars; Navy Unit Commendation
- Fate: Scrapped in 1960

General characteristics
- Class & type: Cleveland-class light cruiser
- Displacement: 11,744 long tons (11,932 t) (standard); 14,131 long tons (14,358 t) (max)
- Length: 610 ft 1 in (185.95 m) oa; 608 ft (185 m)pp
- Beam: 66 ft 4 in (20.22 m)
- Draft: 25 ft 6 in (7.77 m) (mean); 25 ft (7.6 m) (max)
- Installed power: 4 × 634 psi Steam boilers; 100,000 shp (75,000 kW)
- Propulsion: 4 × geared turbines; 4 × screws
- Speed: 32.5 kn (37.4 mph; 60.2 km/h)
- Range: 11,000 nmi (20,000 km) at 15 kn (17 mph; 28 km/h)
- Complement: 1,255 officers and enlisted
- Armament: 4 × triple 6 in (150 mm)/47 caliber Mark 16 guns; 6 × dual 5 in (130 mm)/38 caliber anti-aircraft guns; 4 × quad 40 mm (1.6 in) Bofors anti-aircraft guns; 8 × dual 40 mm (1.6 in) Bofors anti-aircraft guns; 17 × single 20 mm (0.79 in) Oerlikon anti-aircraft cannons
- Armor: Belt: 3 1/2–5 in (89–127 mm); Deck: 2 in (51 mm); Barbettes: 6 in (150 mm); Turrets: 1 1/2–6 in (38–152 mm); Conning Tower: 2 1/4–5 in (57–127 mm)
- Aircraft carried: 4 × floatplanes
- Aviation facilities: 2 × stern catapults

Service record
- Operations: World War II
- Awards: Navy Unit Commendation,11 × battle stars

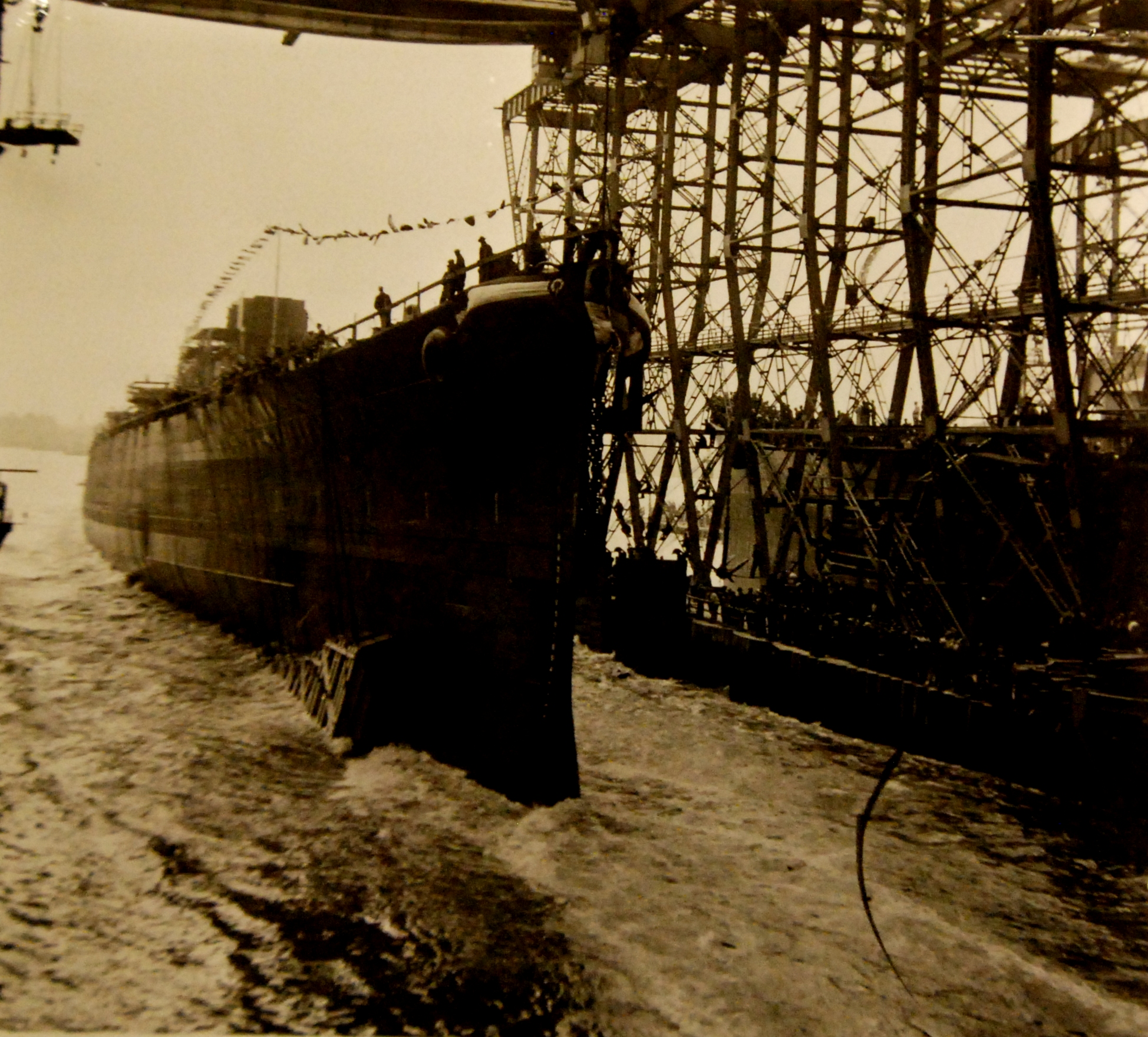
Launch of Denver at the New York Shipbuilding Corporation, Camden, New Jersey, 4 April 1942

USS Denver (hull number: CL-58) was a Cleveland-class light cruiser. Denver launched on 4 April 1942 by New York Shipbuilding Corp., Camden, New Jersey; sponsored by Miss L. J. Stapleton, daughter of the Mayor of Denver; and commissioned on 15 October 1942, Captain Robert Carney in command. It was the second ship named for the city of Denver, Colorado.

== Service history ==
=== 1943 ===
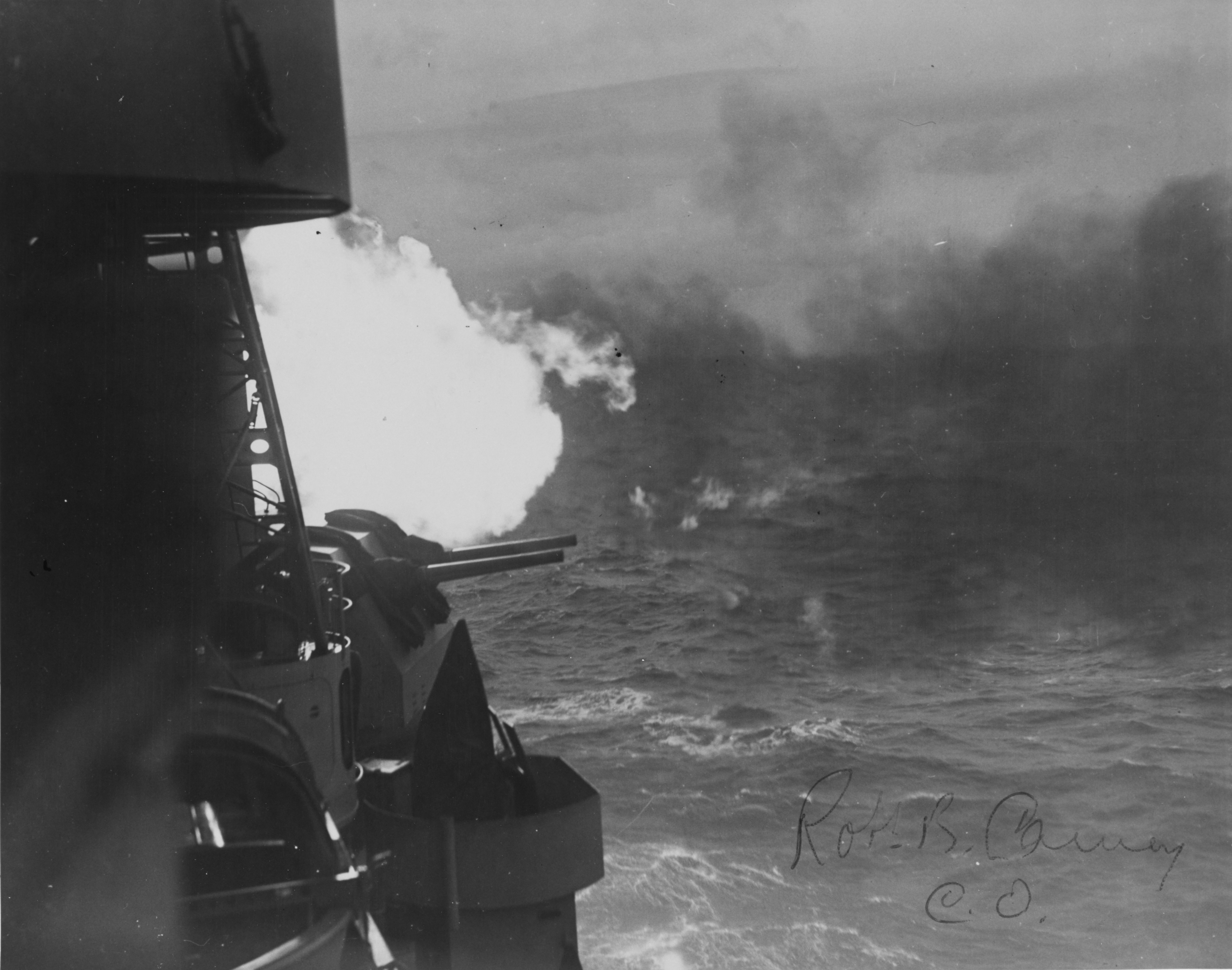
Guns firing during the Battle of Blackett Strait

Denver sailed from Philadelphia on 23 January 1943, and arrived at Efate, New Hebrides on 14 February. Thomas Darden was in command. The new cruiser first saw combat in the bombardment of Vila on Kolombangara in the Solomon Islands, on 6 March. During this action her force engaged and sank the Japanese destroyers Minegumo and Murasame in the Battle of Blackett Strait. Continuing her operations in the Solomons, Denver joined the bombardment of Ballale Island on 29–30 June in conjunction with the invasion landings on New Georgia, then remained in the area on patrol.

On the last day of October 1943, Denver sortied from Port Purvis with Task Force 39 (TF 39) to intercept an enemy force attempting to disrupt the landings at Cape Torokina, Bougainville. In the resulting battle of Empress Augusta Bay on the night of 1/2 November, the American ships sank one enemy light cruiser and a destroyer and damaged two heavy cruisers and two destroyers, while the four other enemy ships broke off the action and retired. During the heavy firing Denver was hit by three 8-inch (203 mm) shells which fortunately did not explode. She shared in the Navy Unit Commendation awarded her division for its outstanding performance in this battle.

Denver covered the support landings on Cape Torokina on 10–11 November 1943, and two days later she was attacked by the lone No.321 Rikko of the 702st ''Kōkūtai'', piloted by Hidezumi Maruyama, attacked Denver's taskforce at night and torpedoed Denver, badly damaging her. Maruyama's plane was perforated 380 times by anti-aircraft fire but managed to return to base. She was towed by Sioux to Port Purvis and then by Pawnee to Espiritu Santo for temporary repairs, then sailed to Mare Island for permanent repairs, arriving on 2 January 1944.

=== 1944 ===
Denver returned to the forward area at Eniwetok, arriving on 22 June. Eight days later, she put to sea to screen carriers as they launched strikes to neutralize Japanese bases in the Bonins and Marianas during the invasion of the Marianas. She bombarded Iwo Jima on 4 July, and after screening continued air assaults returned to Eniwetok on 5 August.

Denver sailed from Port Purvis on 6 September for the invasion of the Palaus. She bombarded Angaur Island from 12 to 18 September, then covered a task unit engaged in minesweeping, reconnaissance and underwater demolition operations before the landings on Ulithi on 23 September. She returned to Manus Island on 28 September to prepare for the return to the Philippines.

Denver departed on 12 October for the landings on Leyte, bombarding Suluan Island and Dulag to open the vast invasion fleet's way into Leyte Gulf, then sailed on to bombard the southern landing beaches. As the Japanese sent the major portion of their remaining combatant fleet south in a desperate attempt to break up the landings, Denver's group took station in Surigao Strait on 24 October to prevent the passage of the Japanese Southern Force into Leyte Gulf. Attacks were made by motor torpedo boats and destroyers stationed in advance of the battle line. Yamashiro, Mogami, and Shigure were all that remained of the Japanese ships when Denver and the others of the battle line opened fire at 0351. With three other cruisers, she made a material contribution to the cumulative gunfire which sank Yamashiro. Mogami was later sunk by aircraft, and Shigure was the sole survivor of Nishimura's fleet which had sailed forth for this phase of the decisive Battle for Leyte Gulf. After this action, Denver sailed to aid in the destruction of any surviving enemy vessels, aiding in sinking Asagumo early in the day on 25 October.

Continuing her service in Leyte Gulf, she fought off numerous attacks; during the one of 28 October, a bomb released from one of the planes she shot down exploded nearby causing minor damage and slight flooding. She screened reinforcement landings in November and fought off a kamikaze attack on 27 November, suffering four men wounded from fragments of a bomb which exploded 200 yards (180 m) off the starboard quarter. She joined the heavy covering group, for the Mindoro landings of 13–16 December, then returned to Manus on 24 December.

=== 1945 ===
Returning to San Pedro Bay on 3 January, Denver sortied the next day to cover the landings at Lingayen Gulf. She remained in the Philippines to join in the consolidation of those islands. She covered the landings on Zambales on 29–30 January, supported minesweeping near and landings on Grande Island; provided fire support at Nasugbu on 31 January; escorted a replenishment convoy to Mindoro from 1 to 7 February; covered the Army landings around Mariveles Bay from 13 to 16 February, rescuing the survivors of the destroyer La Vallette; and supported the operations on Palawan and Mindanao Islands from February to May.

On 7 June, Denver sailed from Subic Bay for the amphibious assaults on Brunei Bay, Borneo, and later at Balikpapan. She covered the pre-invasion work of minesweeping units and underwater demolition teams, and provided fire support for the invading troops until returning to San Pedro Bay, Leyte on 4 July for brief overhaul.

Denver got underway for Okinawa on 13 July to hunt Japanese shipping off the China coast as part of Task Force 95 until 7 August. She sailed from Okinawa on 9 September to cover the evacuation of men of the Allied forces rescued from prison camps in the Wakayama area and covered the landing of occupation troops at Wakanoura Wan from 25 September to 20 October, when she sailed for home.

Denver arrived at Norfolk on 21 November, and after overhaul, reported to Newport, Rhode Island, in January 1946 for duty training men of the Naval Reserve, and a good-will visit to Quebec, Canada. In April, she arrived at Philadelphia Naval Shipyard, where she was placed out of commission in reserve on 7 February 1947. Stricken on 1 March 1959, ex-Denver was sold on 4 February 1960 to Union Minerals and Alloy Corp., New York City, for $260,689.89, and broken-up at Kearny, New Jersey, during November 1960.

== Awards ==
In addition to the Navy Unit Commendation, Denver received 11 battle stars for her World War II service.
