= USS John R. Craig =

Gearing-class destroyer (1945–1979)

Coordinates: 30°19′N 119°32′W

USS John R. Craig (DD-885)
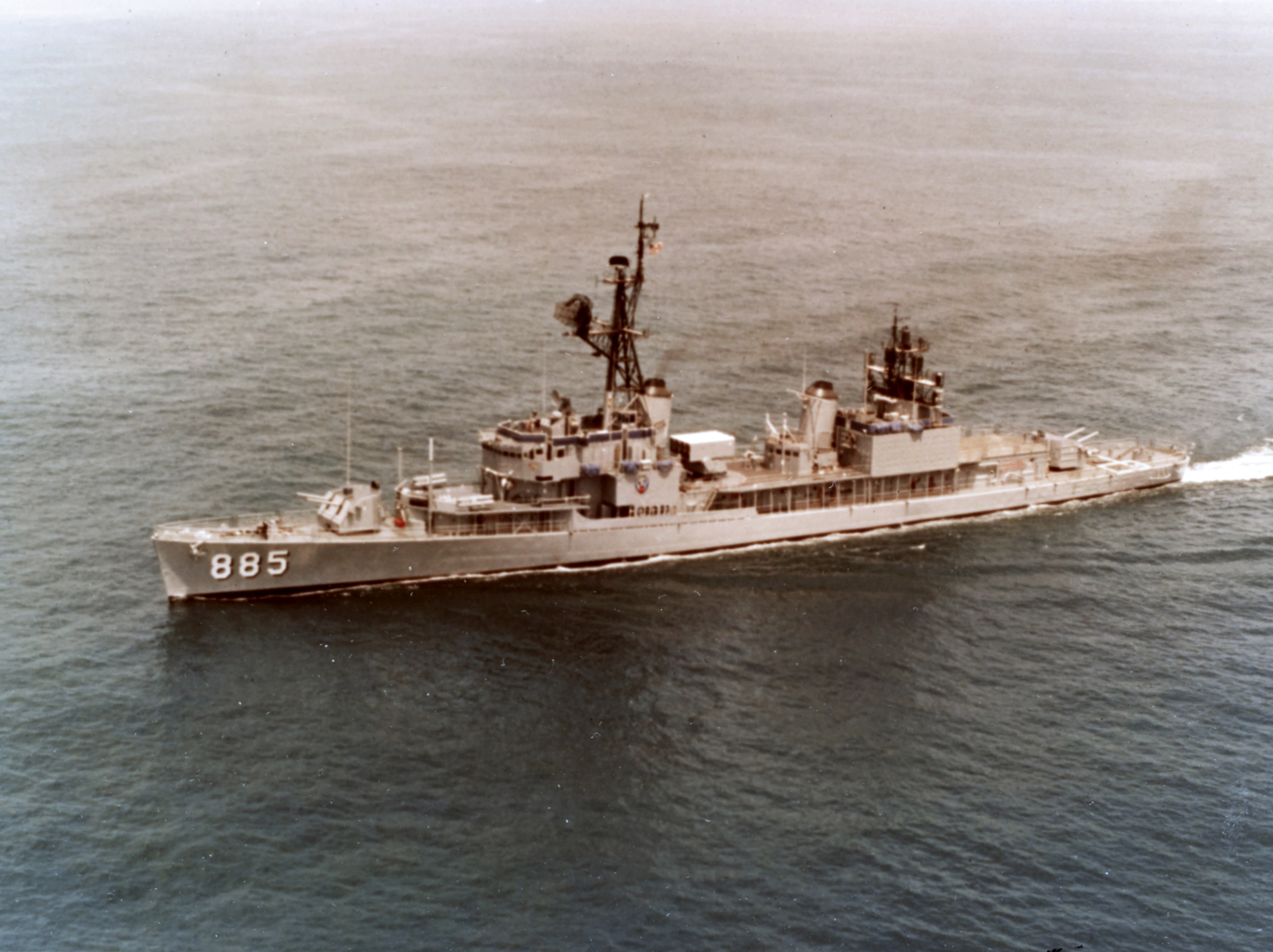
- USS John R. Craig (DD-885) in 1978

History

United States
- Name: John R. Craig
- Namesake: John R. Craig
- Builder: Consolidated Steel Corporation
- Laid down: 17 November 1944
- Launched: 14 April 1945
- Sponsored by: Mrs. Lilian Hyde Craig
- Commissioned: 20 August 1945
- Refit: FRAM upgrade February 1963
- Stricken: 27 July 1979
- Identification: Callsign: NBIE; Hull number: DD-885
- Fate: Sunk as target June 1980

General characteristics
- Class & type: Gearing-class destroyer
- Displacement: 3,460 tons (full)
- Length: 390 ft 6 in (119.02 m)
- Beam: 40 ft 10 in (12.45 m)
- Draft: 14 ft 4 in (4.37 m)
- Propulsion: General Electric geared turbines, 2 screws, 60,000 shp (45,000 kW)
- Speed: 36.8 knots (68.2 km/h; 42.3 mph)
- Range: 4,500 nmi (8,300 km; 5,200 mi) at 20 knots (37 km/h; 23 mph)
- Complement: 336
- Armament: 6 × 5 in (130 mm)/38 cal. AA guns (3×2); 12 × 40 mm AA; 11 × 20 mm AA; 10 × 21 inch (533 mm) tt.(2×5)

USS John R. Craig (DD-885) was a Gearing-class destroyer in service with the United States Navy from 1945 to 1979. She was sunk as a target in June 1980.

== History ==
=== Namesake and commissioning ===
The destroyer was named for Lieutenant Commander John R. Craig. Born in Jacksonville, Florida, Craig graduated from the United States Naval Academy in 1930 and received flight training the following year. During 1935 and 1936 he underwent submarine training. Prior to the outbreak of World War II, he commanded USS R-17 (SS-94). He took command of USS Grampus (SS-207) on 16 September 1942. During the next 6 months he led the submarine on high risk attacks against Japanese shipping. While on her sixth war patrol, Grampus was lost in the Southwest Pacific with all hands on 22 March 1943. He was declared dead on 23 March 1944. Craig was awarded the Navy Cross posthumously for his extraordinary heroism.

John R. Craig was laid down by the Consolidated Steel Corporation at Orange, Texas, on 17 November 1944. John R. Craig was launched on 14 April 1945 by Mrs. Lilian Hyde Craig, Craig's widow, and commissioned on 20 August 1945.

After shakedown in Caribbean John R. Craig, departed Charleston, South Carolina on 19 January 1946 for Naval Station San Diego, arriving 1 February. On 7 February it left to join the United States Seventh Fleet and assist in repatriating Japanese soldiers from North China. The destroyer returned San Diego on 31 January 1947. In the years prior to the Korean conflict it alternated Far Eastern deployments with periods of training off the California coast.

=== Korean War ===
In the lead-up to the Korean War, the USS Craig was dispatched to Jeju Island to enforce a naval blockade in May 1948, preventing insurgents from obtaining mainland help during the Jeju Uprising.

After the Korean War broke out, John R. Craig arrived in the combat zone on 19 February 1951. She immediately commenced operations with Task Force 77, screening aircraft carrier strikes on enemy shore positions. During the Chinese spring offensive the destroyer performed shore bombardment in the Wonsan area, knocking out enemy installations and disrupting transportation. But for two brief periods in San Diego, she continued operations off Korea during the remainder of the conflict.

=== Cold War ===
Following the cessation of hostilities in July 1953, John R. Craig continued patrol operations south of the 38th parallel. From 1954 to 1962 the destroyer engaged in exercises off the West Coast with annual deployments to the Far East. During her 1955 cruise she took an active part in the evacuation of Chinese nationalists from the Dachen Islands during the First Taiwan Strait Crisis. Subsequent cruises consisted of exercises with the Japanese Self Defense Force in 1957, anti-submarine warfare exercises, Taiwan Strait patrol and maneuvers with the Republic of China Navy during the 1961 cruise.

She arrived San Diego 6 March 1962 and underwent an extensive Fleet Rehabilitation and Modernization (FRAM) overhaul at the Hunter's Point Naval Shipyard at San Francisco, California, between 6 March 1962 and 15 March 1963.

=== Vietnam War ===
During the Vietnam War, John R. Craig served as a plane guard for aircraft carriers on Yankee Station in the Tonkin Gulf, participated in Operation Sea Dragon, patrolled on search and rescue duties, and carried out naval gunfire support missions. While responding to a mayday on 28–29 July 1965 in the Da Nang area, John R. Craig supported U.S. Marine and Army of the Republic of Vietnam (ARVN) units with naval gunfire support. At night with danger close, she fired 348 5-inch rounds, preventing the overrun of 3rd Platoon, Hotel Company, 2nd Battalion, 3rd Marines on and near the beach as well as two platoons of the ARVN 2nd Regional Force by a larger Viet Cong (VC) unit. In doing so she effectively destroyed the 7th VC Battalion engaging Marines on the Ca De River Bridge and the northern sector of Da Nang.

On 9 April 1972 while supporting ARVN and American units close to the Vietnamese Demilitarized Zone, the John R. Craig took North Vietnamese artillery fire, using 105 mm howitzers captured from the ARVN. Hundreds of artillery shells fell around her and she was struck by numerous fragments as well as five direct hits which started several fires. One hit at the waterline flooded a compartment with 3 feet (0.91 m) of water, and was dead in the water until the electrical systems and power could be restored. After a quick fix with a soft patch at Da Nang she returned to fight and support allied units the next day, again receiving enemy fire, but did not take any hits.

=== Naval Reserve ===
With newer destroyers coming on the scene during the Vietnam War, John R. Craig was assigned to United States Naval Reserve training at San Diego, California, in 1973. During this time the ship provided naval gunfire support for Naval Gunfire Liaison Officer training, performed plane guard duties for carrier training, and conducted goodwill cruises to ports on the United States West Coast. She made cruises to Portland, Oregon; Seattle, Washington; Everett, Washington; San Francisco, California; Long Beach, California; Vancouver and Victoria, British Columbia; Eureka, California; and Ensenada, Mexico.

John R. Craig was decommissioned and stricken from the Naval Vessel Register on 27 July 1979 and sunk as a target off California on 6 June 1980.
