= Japanese destroyer Murasame (1935) =

Destroyer of the Imperial Japanese Navy

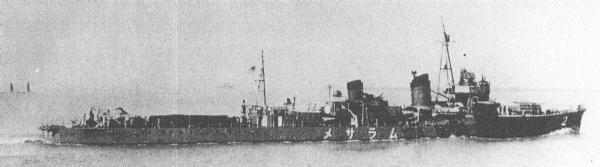
- Murasame at Yangtze River, China, 1937

History

Empire of Japan
- Name: Murasame
- Ordered: 1931 FY
- Builder: Fujinagata Shipyards
- Laid down: 1 February 1934
- Launched: 20 June 1935
- Commissioned: 7 January 1937
- Stricken: 1 April 1943
- Fate: Sunk by American cruisers, 5 March 1943

General characteristics
- Class & type: Shiratsuyu-class destroyer
- Displacement: 1,685 long tons (1,712 t)
- Length: 103.5 m (340 ft) pp; 107.5 m (352 ft 8 in) waterline
- Beam: 9.9 m (32 ft 6 in)
- Draft: 3.5 m (11 ft 6 in)
- Propulsion: 2 shaft Kampon geared turbines; 3 boilers, 42,000 hp (31,000 kW)
- Speed: 34 knots (39 mph; 63 km/h)
- Range: 4,000 nmi (7,400 km) at 18 kn (33 km/h)
- Complement: 226
- Armament: 5 × 12.7 cm/50 Type 3 naval guns (2×2, 1×1); 2 × Type 93 13 mm AA guns; 8 × 24 in (610 mm) torpedo tubes; 16 × Depth charges

Service record
- Operations: Battle of Tarakan (1942); Battle of the Java Sea (1942); Battle of Midway (1942); Battle of the Eastern Solomons (1942); Battle of the Santa Cruz Islands (1942); First Naval Battle of Guadalcanal (1942); Battle of Blackett Strait (1943)
- Victories: SS Op Ten Noort (1927); USS Monssen (1941); USS Grampus (1941)

Murasame (村雨, "Passing Shower") was the third of ten Shiratsuyu-class destroyers, and was built for the Imperial Japanese Navy under the "Circle One" Program (Maru Ichi Keikaku). This vessel should not be confused with the earlier Russo-Japanese War-period Harusame-class torpedo boat destroyer with the same name.

== Construction and commissioning ==
The Shiratsuyu-class destroyers were modified versions of the Hatsuharu class, and were designed to accompany the Japanese main striking force and to conduct both day and night torpedo attacks against the United States Navy as it advanced across the Pacific Ocean, according to Japanese naval strategic projections. Despite being one of the most powerful classes of destroyers in the world at the time of their completion, none survived the Pacific War. Murasame, built at the Fujinagata Shipyards in Osaka was laid down on 1 February 1934, launched on 20 June 1935 and commissioned on 7 January 1937.

== WWII ==
At the time of the attack on Pearl Harbor, Murasame was the flagship of destroyer division 2 (Murasame, Harusame, Yūdachi, Samidare) under Captain Tachibana Masao, and was assigned to the IJN 2nd Fleet, and had sortied from Mako Guard District as part of the "Operation M" (the invasion of the Philippines, covering landings at Vigan and Lingayen Gulf). On 26 December, she collided with minesweeper W-20 off of Kaohsiung, Taiwan, suffering minor damage.

From January 1942, Murasame participated in operations in the Netherlands East Indies, including the invasions of Tarakan Island, Balikpapan and eastern Java. On 26 February, Murasame was escorting a troop convoy to Java when a floatplane spotted an allied cruiser-destroyer fleet attempting to intercept them, leading into the battle of the Java Sea the next afternoon. Murasame and the rest of desdiv 2 - followed by the destroyers Asagumo and Minegumo - were led by the light cruiser Naka during the battle, and early into the engagement launched a mass spread of 43 torpedoes at 15,000 yards. Some of these torpedoes exploded prematurely after a few thousand yards, while the rest missed their targets, with Murasame failing to accomplish anything of note throughout the rest of the battle as it turned into a crushing Japanese victory. However, in the aftermath of the battle, Murasame was continuing to escort the invasion convoy when she, along with other ships, noticed the Dutch hospital ship SS Op Ten Noort sweeping for allied survivors from the many ships sunk throughout the previous day. Murasame joined the destroyer Amatsukaze in halting Op Ten Noort in her tracks and capturing the vessel, and after an inspection party concluded no one was aboard besides the staff, Op Ten Noort was escorted to Singapore where she was converted into the prison ship Tenno Maru.

In March and April, Murasame was based at Subic Bay, from which she assisted in the invasion of Cebu and the blockade of Manila Bay in the Philippines. In May, she returned to Yokosuka Naval Arsenal for repairs.

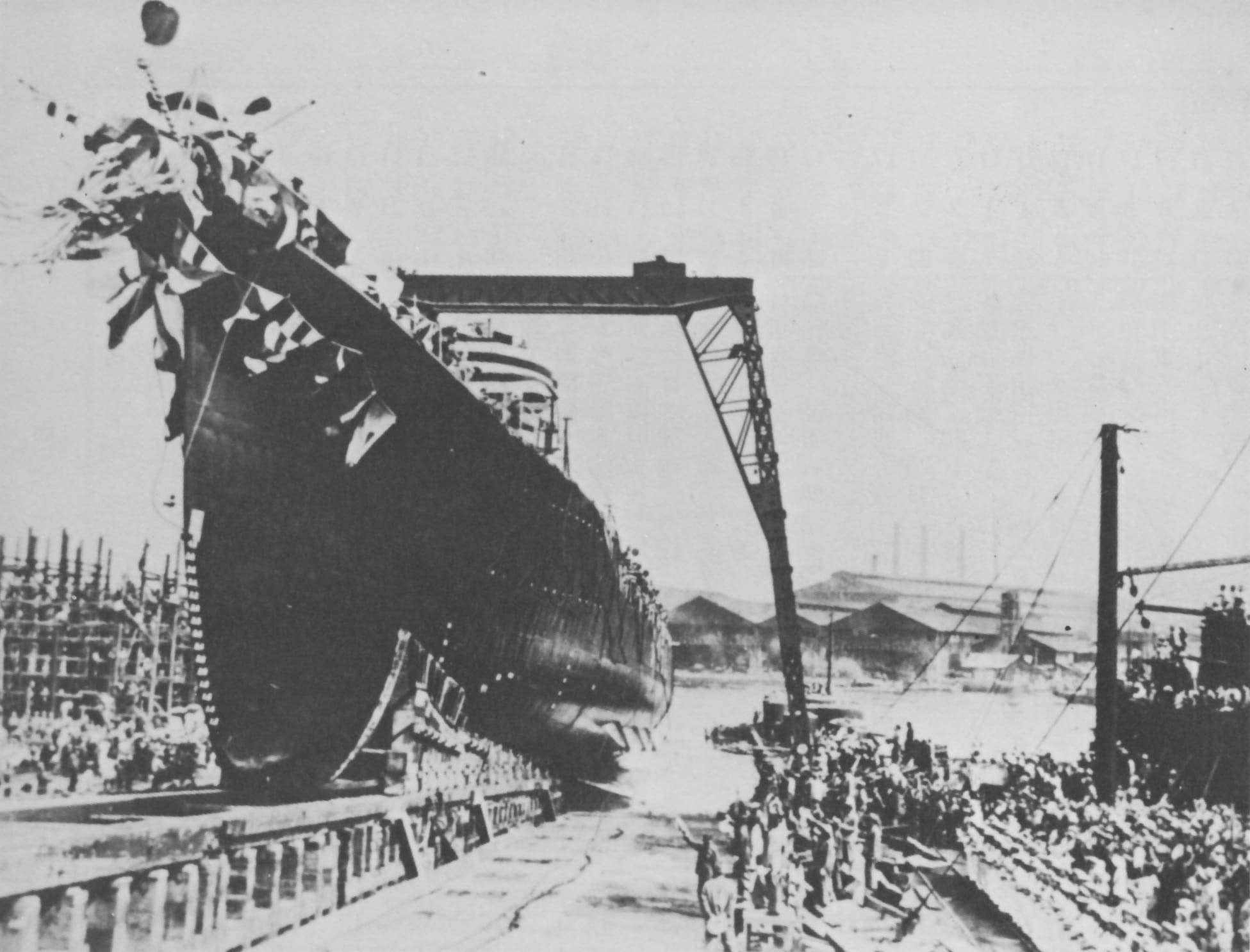
Launching of Murasame

During the Battle of Midway on 4–6 June, Murasame was part of the aborted Midway Occupation Force under Admiral Nobutake Kondō. In late July, Murasame damaged the Dutch submarine O-21 with a depth charge attack, before she transferred to Mergui via Singapore to join the Indian Ocean raiding force, but the operation was cancelled due to developments at Guadalcanal, and she returned to Truk on 21 August. During the Battle of the Eastern Solomons on 24 August, she was part of the escort for the battleship Mutsu, and during most of September, she was an escort for the seaplane tender Kunikawa Maru, exploring the Solomon Islands and Santa Cruz Islands for potential base locations.

In early October, Murasame participated in two "Tokyo Express" high speed transport runs to Guadalcanal or Lae, suffering from minor damage on 5 October in an air attack near Shortland Islands, which necessitated a return to Truk for repairs. In late October through the end of November, Murasame made an additional nine "Tokyo Express" runs. On 25 October 1942 she assisted in rescuing the crew of the cruiser Japanese cruiser Yura, heavily damaged by aircraft attacks, and the next day took part in the Battle of the Santa Cruz Islands as an aircraft carrier escort under Admiral Takeo Kurita.

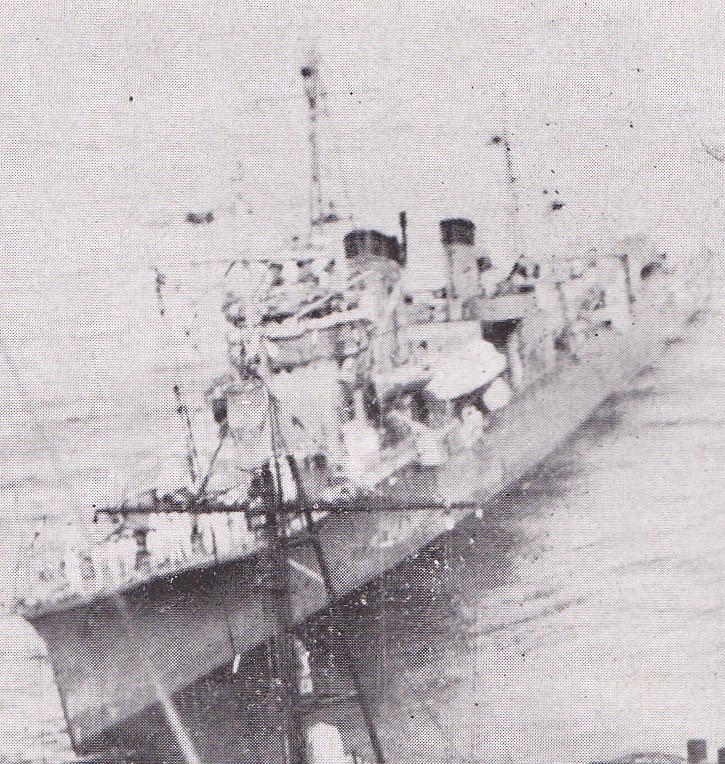
Murasame approaching another ship

=== Naval battle of Guadalcanal ===
On 9 November, Murasame departed alongside a large Japanese task force. With a goal of conducting another major bombardment on Henderson Field, a former Japanese air base which was captured by US forces and being used against Japanese shipping to great effect, the main ships of the force consisted of the battleships Hiei and Kirishima, each armed with eight 356 mm (14 in) guns and a variety of smaller guns. Hiei served as Admiral Abe's flagship. Escorting the force came the light cruiser Nagara, and a total of eleven destroyers, including Murasame. While the destroyers initially operated in a standard formation, heavy rain squalls had managed to break up the formation and leave the destroyers operating in small clusters, which left Murasame in the back left of the formation alongside the destroyers Asagumo and Samidare. This proved crucial in the night of the early morning of the 13th, when the force was attacked by a US task force of two heavy cruisers, three light cruisers and eight destroyers. Murasame was in the back of the formation and was required to close the range to accurately engage the enemy, missing out on the initial action of the battle.

At 2:04, Murasame, along with Asagumo and Samidare finally joined the battle, and noticed the destroyer Amatsukaze under fire from the light cruiser USS Helena, prompting the group to engage Helena and distract her, allowing Amatsukaze to hide behind a smokescreen and withdraw. Firing her torpedoes, Murasame claimed to torpedo and sink Helena, who would in fact survive the battle with relatively little damage. (Note: Because of her claim to torpedo an enemy cruiser, Murasame on rare occasions has been credited for helping to sink the light cruiser USS Juneau, but Japanese records make it clear the cruiser she claimed to sink was USS Helena, with most sources unanimously agreeing the Amatsukaze torpedoed Juneau.) In the process, Murasame was hit by a 6-inch (152 mm) shell that knocked out her forward boiler. After allegedly sinking Helena, she illuminated another opponent with star shells, the destroyer USS Monssen. Asagumo, Murasame, and Samidare opened fire and blasted Monssen at point blank range to the starboard side, while Hiei flanked Monssen to port. Within two minutes, Monssen took at least 39 shell hits, including three 14-inch (356 mm) shells from Hiei, and sank 20 minutes later.

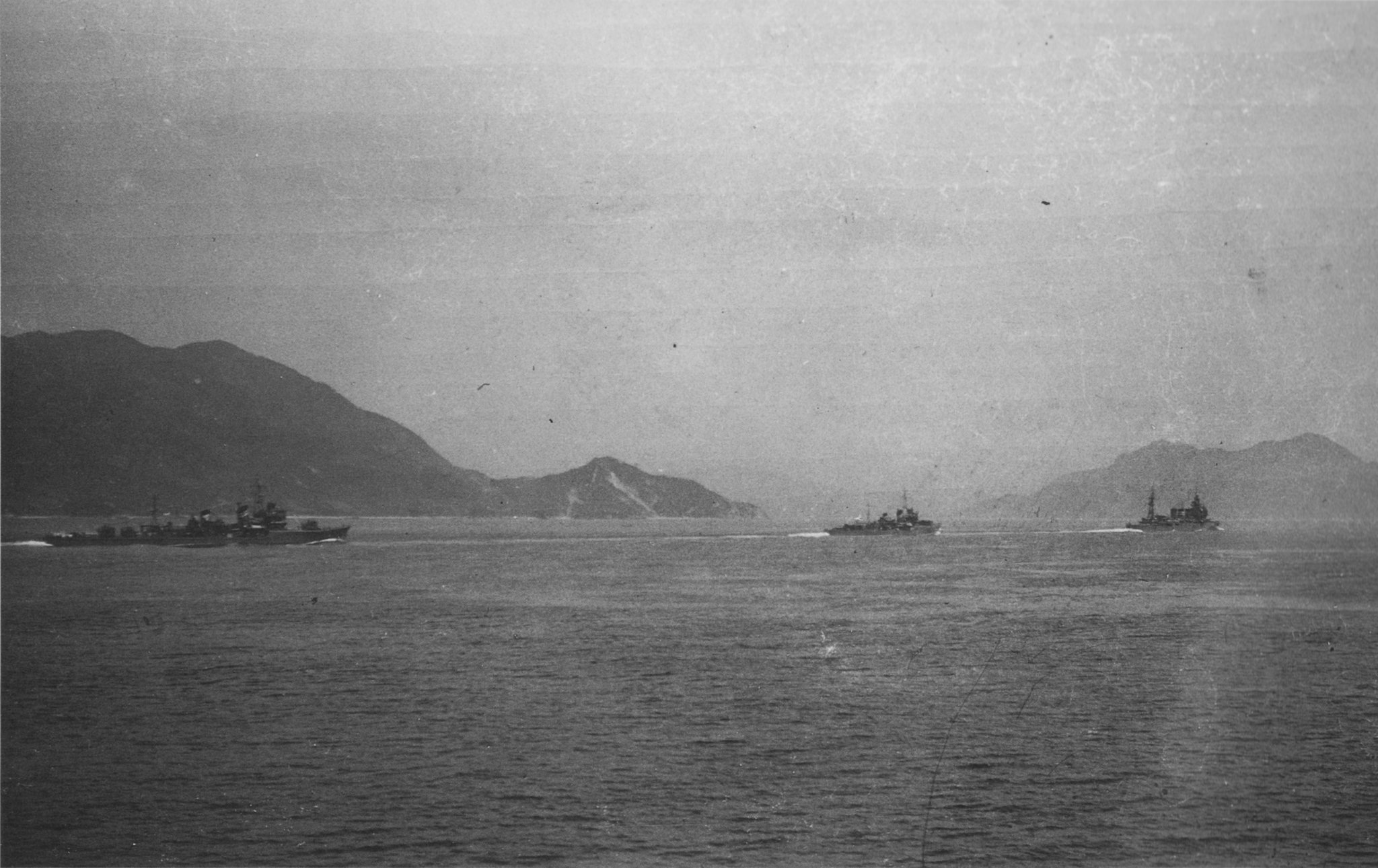
Murasame (right) and Harusame following the light cruiser Yura, early 1942

Due to the shell hit to her boiler, Murasame was forced to withdraw from the battle after the main surface action was over, forced to cruise at 21 knots, and was docked in Truk for repairs by the 18th. These repairs were completed by November 29, and Murasame took part in patrol duty around Truk for the rest of the year.In February 1943, Murasame returned to Truk escorting the aircraft carrier Chūyō, and continued on to Rabaul to resume transport operations to Kolombangara.

=== Battle of the Blackett Strait ===
Main Article: Battle of the Blackett Strait

On 4 March, Murasame and the destroyer Minegumo departed Rabaul on a troop transport run to Kolombangara. While this was being undertaken later that night, the pair ran into an enemy submarine, prompting Murasame and Minegumo to blast the submarine with 5-inch (127 mm) gunfire and send it to the bottom. A heavy oil slick was spotted soon afterwards, and the submarine was listed as sunk; the identify of this submarine is almost certainly the USS Grampus. Grampus was last seen near the area of Murasame's and Minegumo's attack less than 24 hours beforehand, and no allied submarines report surviving an attack by Japanese warships.

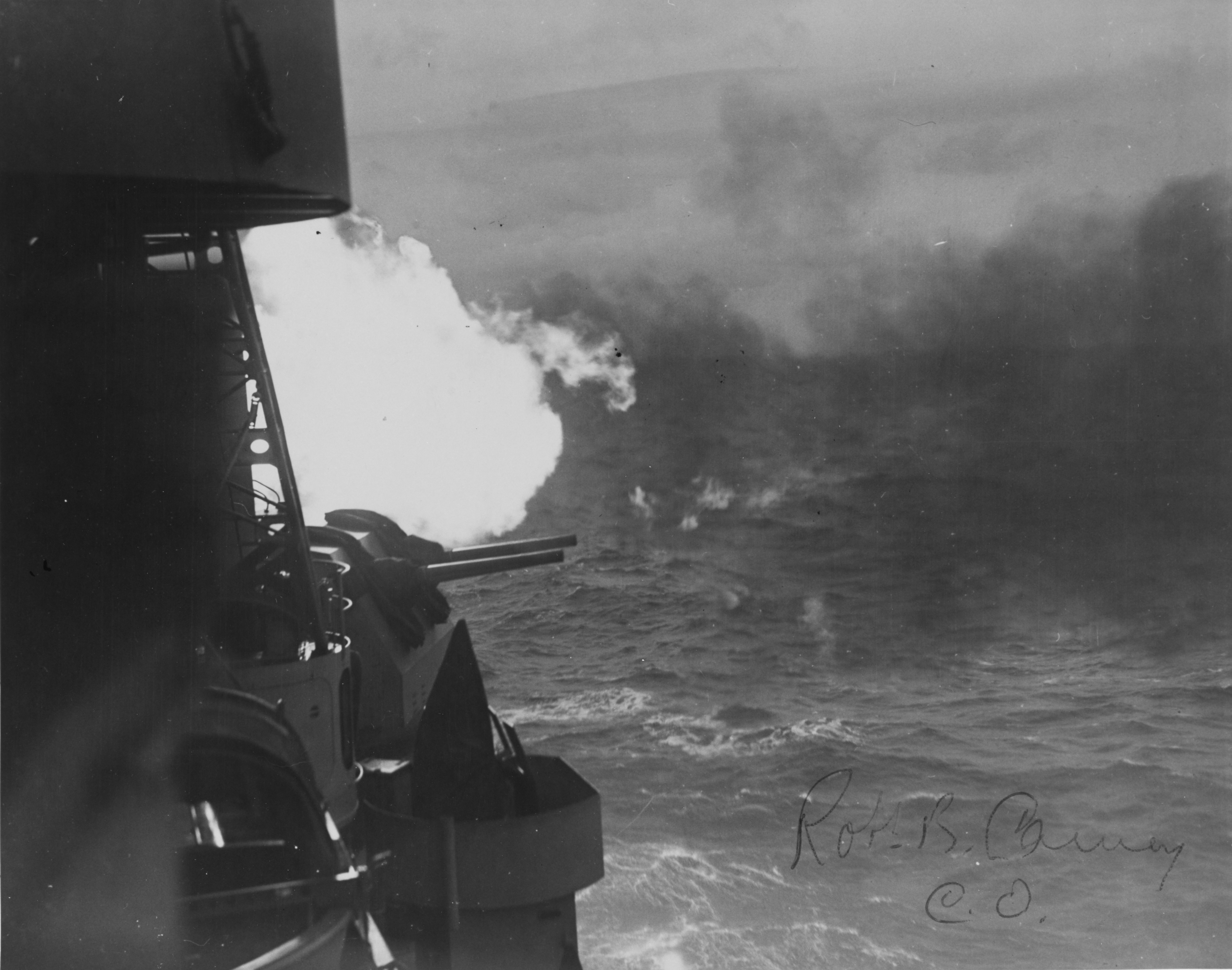
USS Denver firing on Murasame

On the morning of the 5th, Murasame and Minegumo stopped at Buin for refueling, before resuming their journey to Kolombangara. Later that night, the pair successfully unloaded their ground troops and supplies before turning around and departing for Rabaul, but they were not alone. The destroyers suffered the misfortune of encountering an American naval task force underway to conduct shore bombardment on Vila, consisting of the light cruisers USS Cleveland, Denver, and Montpellier and their escorting destroyers. The Americans had the fortune of detecting Murasame and Minegumo on their radar guided fire controls, the Japanese did not and were completely ignorant to the presence of the allied ships. After closing to 11,000 yards, Denver and Montpelier opened fire, their target was Murasame, which on the 6th salvo was hit by a 6-inch (152 mm) shell. Murasame and Minegumo responded with gunfire, but this failed to dissuade their opponents as gunfire blasted away Murasame's guns, smokestacks, communications, and steering, and flooded seawater into the ships hull. The destroyer USS Waller closed to point blank range and unleashed a spread of ten torpedoes, two of which nearly hit Murasame but managed to pass underneath the ship. However, one of Waller's torpedoes continued on and tore into Minegumo, the destroyer immediately burst into flames and sank by the stern with the loss of 46 men. Simultaneously, Denver and Montpelier's gunfire reached the engines and boilers, crippling Murasame as she stopped dead in the water. The abandon ship order was issued as Denver and Montpelier continued to drown the drifting Murasame in 6-inch (152 mm) and 5-inch (127 mm) rounds, and some 15 minutes after Minegumo's loss, Murasame herself sank with the loss of 128 men, including Commander Fukamura Zenzabruo. 53 survivors, including Captain Tachibana Masao swam to Kolombangara and were later rescued. (Note: Murasame has sometimes been stated to have sunk with no survivors, but this comes from a mistake made by the website Destroyer Murasame | World War 2 Database which confused the list of Murasame's survivors for her sistership Yamakaze, which actually sank with no survivors. Other websites have sited this has a source without proper research.)

It is often repeated in Western-based accounts of the battle that Denver and Montpelier sank Minegumo, while Waller sank Murasame. This was due to an error by historian Samuel Morison who transposed the sinkings of the two Japanese destroyers, claiming Murasame sank at 2:15 and Minegumo sank at 2:30, when it was in fact the opposite. Japanese sources almost unanimously state Minegumo was torpedoed while Murasame was sunk by cruiser gunfire.

A memorial monument to the crew of Murasame exists at Kannonzaki, in Yokosuka, Japan.

== See also ==
- Murasame-class destroyer (1958)
- Murasame-class destroyer (1994)

== Readings ==
- D'Albas, Andrieu (1965). Death of a Navy: Japanese Naval Action in World War II. Devin-Adair Pub. ISBN 0-8159-5302-X.
- Brown, David (1990). Warship Losses of World War Two. Naval Institute Press. ISBN 1-55750-914-X.
- Howarth, Stephen (1983). The Fighting Ships of the Rising Sun: The Drama of the Imperial Japanese Navy, 1895–1945. Atheneum. ISBN 0-689-11402-8.
- Jentsura, Hansgeorg (1976). Warships of the Imperial Japanese Navy, 1869–1945. US Naval Institute Press. ISBN 0-87021-893-X.
- Hara, Tameichi (1961). Japanese Destroyer Captain. New York & Toronto: Ballantine Books. ISBN 0-345-27894-1.
- Lengerer, Hans (2007). The Japanese Destroyers of the Hatsuharu Class. Warship 2007. London: Conway. pp. 91–110. ISBN 978-1-84486-041-8.OCLC 77257764
- Kilpatrick, C. W. (1987). Naval Night Battles of the Solomons. Exposition Press. ISBN 0-682-40333-4.
- Nelson, Andrew N. (1967). Japanese–English Character Dictionary. Tuttle. ISBN 0-8048-0408-7.
- Watts, Anthony J (1967). Japanese Warships of World War II. Doubleday. ISBN 978-0-3850-9189-3.
- Whitley, M J (2000). Destroyers of World War Two: An International Encyclopedia. London: Arms and Armour Press. ISBN 1-85409-521-8.
- Hara, Tameichi (1961). Japanese Destroyer Captain. New York: Ballantine Books. ISBN 0-345-02522-9.
