= HMS Thalia =

Three ships of the Royal Navy have borne the name HMS Thalia, after Thalia, the name of a number of figures in Greek mythology, notably Thalia, one of the three Graces:

- HMS Thalia was a 36-gun fifth rate launched in 1782 as HMS Unicorn. She was renamed HMS Thalia in 1783 and was broken up in 1814.
- HMS Thalia (1830) was a 46-gun fifth rate launched in 1830 and broken up by 1867.
- HMS Thalia (1869) was a Juno-class wooden screw corvette launched in 1869. She was converted to a 10-gun troop ship in 1886, a powder hulk in 1891 and a base ship in 1915. She was sold in 1920.
