= Vella Gulf =

Coordinates: 7.90°S 156.82°E

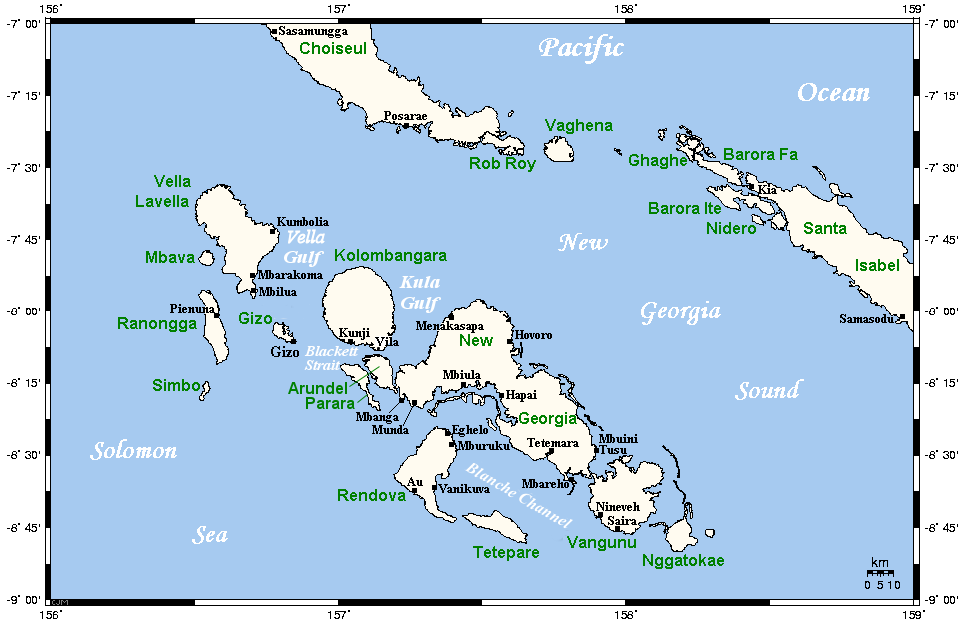
Vella Gulf lies between the westernmost large island (Vella Lavella) and the large round island (Kolombangara).

Vella Gulf is a waterway in the Western Province of the Solomon Islands. It lies between the islands of Vella Lavella to the northwest, Kolombangara to the southeast, and Ghizo to the south. It connects New Georgia Sound ("The Slot") to the northeast with the Solomon Sea to the south.

During the Solomon Islands campaign in World War II, the Battle of Vella Gulf was fought here between destroyers of the Imperial Japanese Navy and the U.S. Navy on the night of 6–7 August 1943, with an Allied victory.

== Notes ==
Citations

References

- Brown, David (1990). Warship Losses of World War Two. Naval Institute Press. ISBN 1-55750-914-X.
- Calhoun, C. Raymond (2000). Tin Can Sailor: Life Aboard the USS Sterett, 1939-1945. Naval Institute Press. ISBN 1-55750-228-5.
- Crenshaw, Russell Sydnor (1998). South Pacific Destroyer: The Battle for the Solomons from Savo Island to Vella Gulf. Naval Institute Press. ISBN 1-55750-136-X.
- D'Albas, Andrieu (1965). Death of a Navy: Japanese Naval Action in World War II. Devin-Adair Pub. ISBN 0-8159-5302-X.
- Dull, Paul S. (1978). A Battle History of the Imperial Japanese Navy, 1941-1945. Naval Institute Press. ISBN 0-87021-097-1.
- Hara, Tameichi (1961). Japanese Destroyer Captain. New York & Toronto: Ballantine Books. ISBN 0-345-27894-1.-Firsthand account of the battle by Japanese squadron commander aboard Shigure.
- Hone, Thomas C. (1981), "The Similarity of Past and Present Standoff Threats", Proceedings of the U.S. Naval Institute, vol. 107, no. 9, September 1981, Annapolis, Maryland, pp. 113–116, ISSN 0041-798X
- Kilpatrick, C. W. (1987). Naval Night Battles of the Solomons. Exposition Press. ISBN 0-682-40333-4.
- Morison, Samuel Eliot (1958). Breaking the Bismarcks Barrier, vol. 6 of History of United States Naval Operations in World War II. Castle Books. ISBN 0-7858-1307-1.
- Roscoe, Theodore (1953). United States Destroyer Operations in World War Two. Naval Institute Press. ISBN 0-87021-726-7.
