= Japanese destroyer Minegumo (1937) =

Asashio-class destroyer

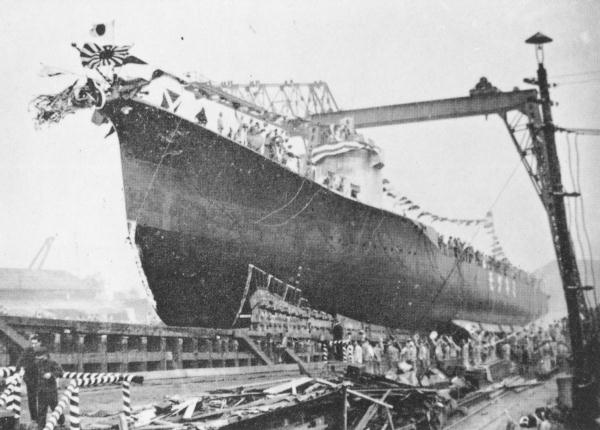
- Minegumo launch on 4 November 1937

History

Empire of Japan
- Name: Minegumo
- Ordered: 1934 Maru-2 Program
- Builder: Fujinagata Shipyards
- Laid down: 22 March 1937
- Launched: 4 November 1937
- Commissioned: 4 April 1938
- Stricken: 1 April 1943
- Fate: Sunk in Battle of Blackett Strait, 5 March 1943

General characteristics
- Class & type: Asashio-class destroyer
- Displacement: 2,370 long tons (2,408 t)
- Length: 111 m (364 ft) pp; 115 m (377 ft 4 in)waterline; 118.3 m (388 ft 1 in) OA
- Beam: 10.386 m (34 ft 0.9 in)
- Draft: 3.7 m (12 ft 2 in)
- Propulsion: 2-shaft geared turbine, 3 boilers, 50,000 shp (37,285 kW)
- Speed: 35 knots (40 mph; 65 km/h)
- Range: 5,700 nmi (10,600 km) at 10 kn (19 km/h); 960 nmi (1,780 km) at 34 kn (63 km/h)
- Complement: 230
- Armament: 6 × 12.7 cm/50 Type 3 DP guns; up to 28 × Type 96 AA guns; up to 4 × Type 93 AA guns; 8 × 24 in (610 mm) torpedo tubes; 36 depth charges

Service record
- Operations: Battle of Tarakan (1942); Battle of the Java Sea (1942); Battle of Midway (1942); Battle of the Eastern Solomons (1942); Battle of Blackett Strait (1943)
- Victories: HMS Electra (1934); USS Grampus (1941)

Minegumo (峯雲, Summit Cloud) was the eighth of ten Asashio-class destroyers built for the Imperial Japanese Navy in the mid-1930s under the Circle Two Supplementary Naval Expansion Program (Maru Ni Keikaku).

== Design and construction ==
The Asashio-class destroyers were larger and more capable that the preceding Shiratsuyu class, as Japanese naval architects were no longer constrained by the provisions of the London Naval Treaty. These light cruiser-sized vessels were designed to take advantage of Japan's lead in torpedo technology, and to accompany the Japanese main striking force and in both day and night attacks against the United States Navy as it advanced across the Pacific Ocean, according to Japanese naval strategic projections. Despite being one of the most powerful classes of destroyers in the world at the time of their completion, none survived the Pacific War.

Minegumo, built at the Fujinagata Shipyards in Osaka was laid down on 22 March 1937, launched on 4 November 1937 and commissioned on 4 April 1938. Upon commissioning, she was assigned as the last vessel of destroyer division 41 (Asagumo, Yamagumo, Natsugumo, Minegumo), and the typical peacetime patrols and escorting duties ensued. At the end of the year Minegumo's steam turbines broke down, requiring repairs in the Yokosuka naval arsenal. on 23 November 1943, desdiv 41 was renamed to destroyer division 9 (with the same order of ships), At 1800 hours on 23 June 1941, Minegumo in the Bungo channel collided with the destroyer Natsushio, destroying her bow, before the destroyer Kuroshio failed to evade and rammed her stern. All three destroyers were damaged, but Minegumo received the worst of it, and spent five months in repair, just in time to join the rest of destroyer division 9 for service in the 2nd World War.

== WWII ==
At the time of the attack on Pearl Harbor, Minegumo, under the command of Lieutenant Commander Suzuki Yasuatsu, was assigned to Destroyer Division 8 (Asagumo, Yamagumo, Natsugumo, Minegumo), and a member of Destroyer Squadron 4 of the IJN 2nd Fleet, escorting Admiral Nobutake Kondō's Southern Force Main Body out of Mako Guard District as distant cover to the Malaya and Philippines invasion forces in December 1941. In early 1942, she escorted troop convoys to Lingayen, Tarakan, Balikpapan and Makassar in the Netherlands East Indies.

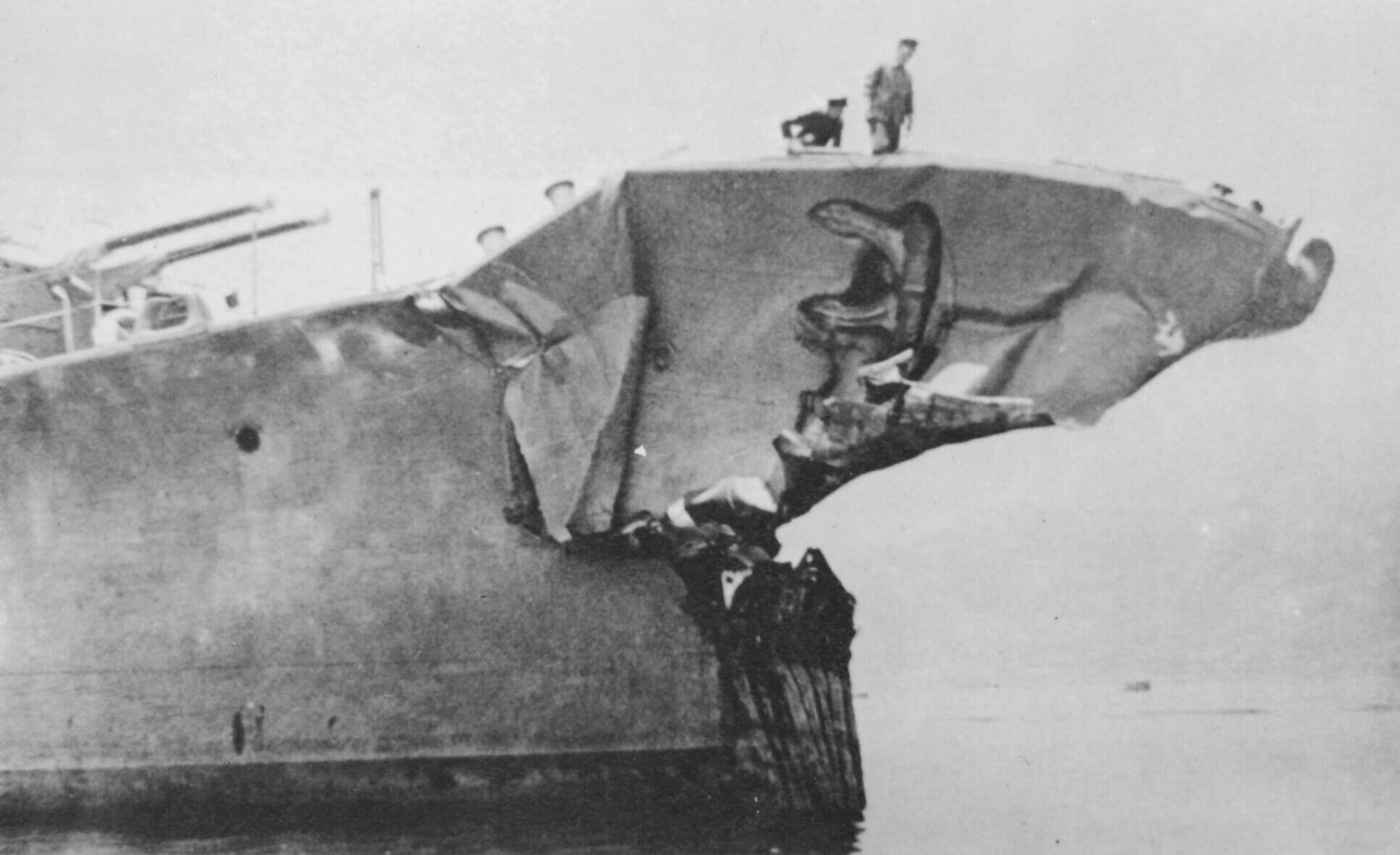
Damage to Minegumo's bow after colliding with Natsushio and Kuroshio, 24 June 1941

During the Battle of the Java Sea, she engaged the last of the allied cruisers and destroyers of ABDA fleet attempting to defend the Dutch East Indies, contributing to a spread of 43 torpedoes at 15,000 yards which failed to score any hits. Minegumo then joined Asagumo in engaging a trio of British destroyers - HMS Encounter, Electra, and Jupiter - attempting to cover the crippled heavy cruiser HMS Exeter, and opened fire. Minegumo engaged in a gunnery duel with Jupiter and Encounter, taking light near miss damage which wounded four men, but in turn repelling both destroyers and causing them to retreat. Minegumo then noticed Asagumo was damaged by gunfire, bit in turn crippled Electra; destroying her engine room and her A and X turrets, wrecking her communications, and disabling electrical power. To protect the desdiv 9 flagship, Minegumo joined Asagumo in delivering the finishing blow to the mauled Electra, resulting 5-inch (127 mm) shell hits destroyed Electra's remaining guns, flooding overwhelmed damage control, and fires burned out of control under Asagumo's and Minegumo's bombardment. Electra's crew finally abandoned ship and left her to sink.

After participation in the Battle of Christmas Island on 31 March – 10 April, she escorted the damaged cruiser Naka to Singapore, and returned at the end of the month to the Yokosuka Naval Arsenal for repairs.

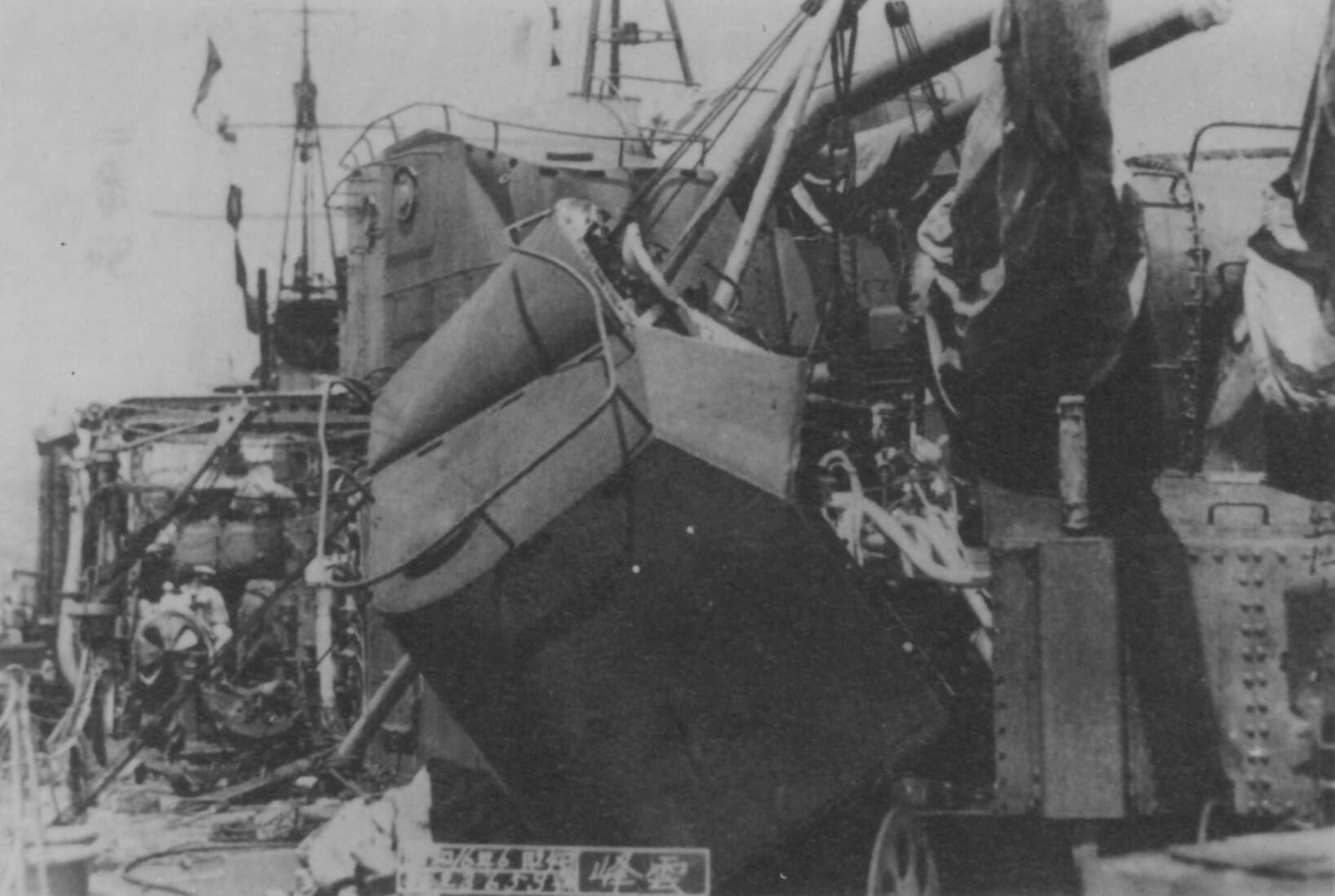
Collision damage to Minegumo's stern

At the end of May, Minegumo joined the escort for the Midway Invasion Force under the overall command of Admiral Kondo Nobutake during the Battle of Midway. In July, she was sent to northern waters, patrolling from Ominato Guard District towards the Kurile Islands. Afterwards, she was sent south to Truk, where she suffered minor damage on a coral reef on 20 August. She provided support in the Battle of the Eastern Solomons in August 1942 and escorted the damaged aircraft carrier Chitose back to Truk. From September, she was assigned to patrols from Truk towards Shortland, and in October was assigned to "Tokyo Express" high speed transport operations in the Solomon Islands. On one of these missions on 5 October, she suffered moderate damage in an air attack, with serious flooding 150 miles (240 km) off Guadalcanal. She limped back to Yokosuka for repairs by the end of November.

Repairs completed by 22 February 1943, Minegumo returned with a convoy to Truk. She continued on to Rabaul by 2 March. During another transport run from Rabaul to Kolombangara on 5 March Minegumo and Murasame are believed to have sunk the submarine USS Grampus. However, that same night, Murasame and Minegumo were detected by the American Task Force 68 off Vila, after delivering supplies to the Japanese base there. Both ships were sunk in the subsequent action (later known as the Battle of Blackett Strait) at 08°01′S 157°14′E. On Minegumo, 46 crewmen (including her captain, Lieutenant Commander Yoshitake Uesugi) perished, but 122 survivors later reached Japanese lines, and two were captured by the Americans. Minegumo was removed from the navy list on 1 April 1943.

== See also ==
- The Battle of Blackett Strait
