= Nakaza Island =

Island in Solomon Islands

Coordinates: 7°51′S 156°29′E

Nakaza Island is a small island in the New Georgia Islands group of Western Province, Solomon Islands.

== Geography ==
The island is located 7 km north of Ranongga Island. It is 160 m long and 80 m wide, and sits on a 3 km long coral atoll.

The island is covered in tropical native plants.

== See also ==
- Western Province topics
