= Naru Island (Solomon Islands) =

Island in Solomon Islands

- Interactive map of Naru Island

Geography
- Location: Solomon Islands
- Coordinates: 8°08′20″S 156°55′02″E
- Archipelago: New Georgia Islands
- Area: 0.15 km^{2} (0.058 sq mi)

Demographics
- Population: 0

Naru Island is a small island in the New Georgia Islands of Western Province, Solomon Islands, lying to the southeast of Gizo. About 600 metres long and up to 300 metres wide. Coastline is about 1,65 km.

The island is primarily notable for its role in the events after the sinking of PT-109 involving future United States President John F. Kennedy.

== See also ==
- Kennedy Island
- Olasana Island
