= John Francis Goldie =

Australian missionary (1870–1955)

- Born: 1870; Hobart, Tasmania, Australia
- Died: 1955 (aged 84–85); Melbourne, Australia
- Occupation: Methodist missionary
- Known for: 50 years missionary work in the British Solomon Islands
- Spouse: Helena Teague

John Francis Goldie (1870 – 1955) founded the Methodist Mission in New Georgia Islands, which are part of the Solomon Islands. He was chairman of the Solomon Island District of the Methodist Mission from 1902 until his retirement in 1951.

In 1897, he entered the Methodist ministry in Queensland, where he served as a pastor for five years. On 13 April 1901, he married Helena Teague in Queensland.

In 1901, the Australian Government enacted the Pacific Island Labourers Act 1901, the effect of which included the deportation of Melanesian labourers. In 1902, he travelled to Roviana in New Georgia, Solomon Islands with returning Solomon Islanders, including Sam Angarau. The Methodist Mission in New Georgia was established by the Rev. Goldie in 1902, along with S. R. Rooney and a lay missionary, J. R. Martin, who was a carpenter by trade. Goldie dominated the mission and gained the loyalty of Solomon Islander members of his church.

Goldie was chairman of the Solomon Island District of the Australasian Methodist Missionary Society from 1902. He travelled through Western Solomon Islands in the two-masted mission schooner the Tandanya. Goldie became a minister of the New Zealand Conference in 1922 when the Methodist Church of New Zealand took over the Solomon Islands District and was the president of the New Zealand Conference in 1929. Dr. Edward Sayers worked at the Methodist mission from 1927 to 1934. He set up hospitals at Gizo, Munda and Vella Lavella in the Western Province.

Goldie had a reputation for procrastination and an egocentric desire to be in control. His abrasive personality brought him into conflict with J. R. Metcalfe, another strong-willed missionary, who succeeded Goldie as chairman of the Methodist Mission in the Solomons in 1951. The relationship with the colonial administrators of the British Solomon Island Protectorate were also fraught with difficulty, at this time due to Goldie's effective control over the Western Solomon Islands. The witticism describing Goldie's 50 years in the Protectorate, was that in Western Solomon Islands, there were three Gs. In descending order of importance, the Gs are: Goldie, God and Government.

== See also ==
- United Church in Solomon Islands
