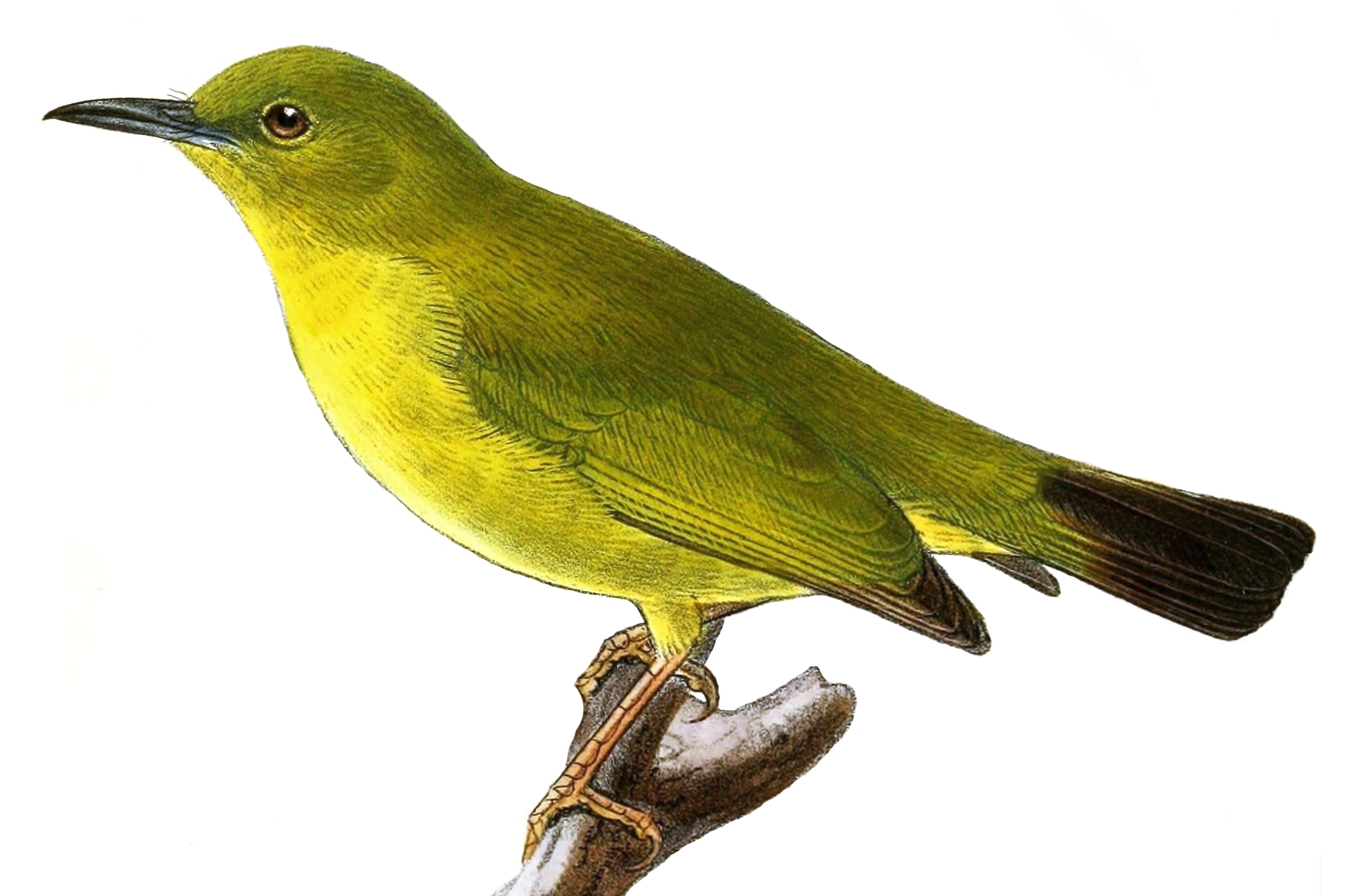

Conservation status
- Least Concern (IUCN 3.1)

Scientific classification
- Kingdom: Animalia
- Phylum: Chordata
- Class: Aves
- Order: Passeriformes
- Family: Zosteropidae
- Genus: Zosterops
- Species: Z. kulambangrae

Binomial name
- Zosterops kulambangrae Rothschild & Hartert, 1901

= Solomons white-eye =

Species of bird

The Solomons white-eye or New Georgia white-eye (Zosterops kulambangrae) is a species of bird in the family Zosteropidae. It is endemic to the New Georgia Islands in the Solomon Islands. It is also known as Zosterops rendovae but this name properly refers to the grey-throated white-eye.

The species is widespread in the New Georgia Group, occurring on Kolombangara, Vonavona, Kohinggo, New Georgia, Vangunu and Nggatokae. It regularly visits small islets.

It is 12 cm long and mainly green on its upper body and olive-yellow on the underside. It has a narrow white ring around the eye, blackish forehead and lores, a black bill and yellowish legs.
