= Mbava =

Island in Solomon Islands

Coordinates: 7.821°S 156.540°E

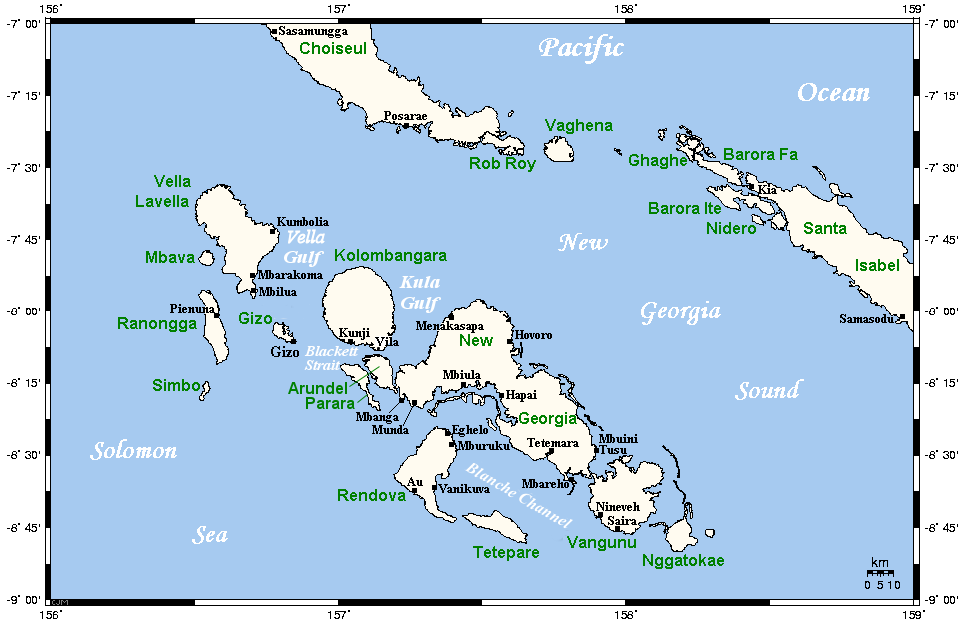
Mbava in the New Georgia Islands, at left

Mbava (also called Baga) is an island in Western Province, Solomon Islands.

It is located in the New Georgia Islands Group, lying just west of Vella Lavella. The island has a Tropical rainforest climate.
