= Edward Sayers (parasitologist) =

New Zealand doctor (1902–1985)

Sir Edward Sayers CMG KStJ
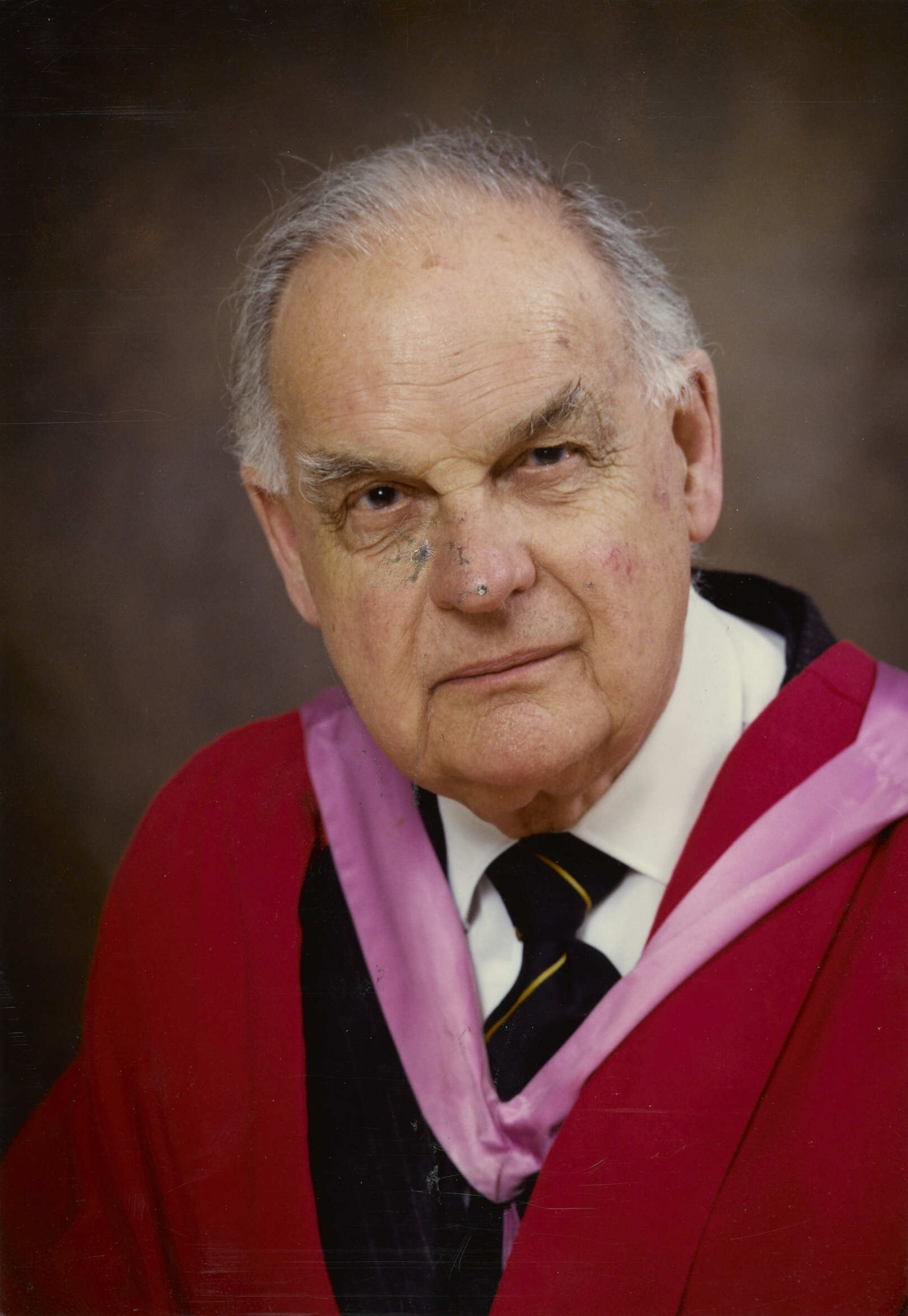
- Sayers in 1981
- Born: 10 September 1902; Christchurch, New Zealand
- Died: 12 May 1985 (aged 82); Dunedin, New Zealand
- Education: University of Otago, School of Medicine, graduated MB, ChB (1924)
- Known for: Fieldwork in the treatment of malaria undertaken in the Solomon Islands 1927–1934
- Spouses: Jane Lumsden Grove (m. 1928–1971) Patricia Dorothy Coleman (m. 1971–1985)
- Awards: Cilento medal of the Australian Institute of Anatomy (1940)
- Scientific career
- Fields: Parasitology and Medical education. MB ChB NZ 1924, DTM&H Eng 1927, MRCP 1935, FRACP 1937, FRCP 1948, Hon FACP 1957, MD NZ 1958, FRCSEd 1960. Regd 18 May 1925: Wellington Hospital, Auckland and Dunedin
- Workplaces: University of Otago, School of Medicine, Dean 1958–1968

Sir Edward George Sayers CMG KStJ (10 September 1902 – 12 May 1985) was a New Zealand medical doctor, parasitologist, Methodist missionary, military medical administrator, consultant physician and, from 1958 to 1968, Dean of the University of Otago, School of Medicine. Having trained as a doctor, from 1927 to 1934 he worked at the Methodist mission in the Solomon Islands where he carried out fieldwork in the treatment of malaria. The significance of this work became apparent when Sayers used his knowledge to reduce deaths of American, Australia and New Zealand military forces during the invasion of Pacific Islands during World War II. He served as a doctor with the 2nd Division 2 NZEF during 1941–42 in Greece and North Africa. In 1942 he was transferred to the Pacific to serve with the 3rd Division, 2 NZEF IP.

His 1943 handbook on malaria control, Malaria in the South Pacific, became a standard text. As a specialist in tropical diseases (malaria, dengue fever, sand-fly fever and dysentery) his work contributed to minimising deaths in the New Zealand army. The pre-war experience and malaria records of Sayers was also helpful to the United States forces in reducing malaria rates during the Solomon Islands campaign. His contribution was acknowledged by the award of the Legion of Merit by the United States.

== Early life ==
Sayers was born in New Brighton, Christchurch, on 10 September 1902. His mother was Amelia Ruth Blandford; his father was Henry Hind Sayers, a cabinet maker from Sussex, England, who suffered from T.B. spine and became paraplegic after an accident. Sayers' brothers were Stanley, Harry and Charles.

He won a scholarship to Christ's College, Christchurch where he remained until he was 15, when family circumstances caused him to leave. He worked for two years as a clerk.

== Medical training ==
With the assistance of his church Sayers was able to attend university. He studied at the University of Otago Dunedin School of Medicine and graduated MB ChB in 1924. He spent a year as a house physician at Wellington Hospital, and then gained further training at the London School of Hygiene & Tropical Medicine, where he received a diploma in tropical medicine in 1926.

== Methodist missionary in the Solomon Islands ==
From 1927 to 1934 he worked at the Methodist mission in the Solomon Islands. On 3 March 1928, at Roviana in New Georgia, Solomon Islands, Sayers married Jane Lumsden Grove; they had six children: two sons, John and Edward; and four daughters, Kathleen, Margaret, Nancy and Pamela. Sayers set up hospitals at Gizo, Munda and Vella Lavella in the Western Province of the Solomon Islands.

The Methodist Mission in the Western Province in the New Georgia Islands around the Roviana lagoon had been established by Rev. John Francis Goldie in 1902. He dominated the mission and gained the loyalty of Solomon Islander members of his church, although he had an autocratic approach to the management of his subordinates. The relationship with the colonial administrators of the British Solomon Island Protectorate were also fraught with difficulty due to Goldie's effective control over the Western Solomon Islands. Navigating these complicated relationships give Sayers valuable management skills, which he would later apply as a military medical administrator and university dean. However it was the knowledge as to the treatment of malaria and other tropical diseases that Sayers gained from setting up hospitals in the Solomons that he later applied during his service as a physician with the New Zealand General Hospital that was part of the New Zealand Expeditionary Force during World War II. Sayers also identified that an effective treatment of tropical ulcers was the application of non-adherent dressings; he used the recently developed sticking plaster tape. On reporting his findings Beiersdorf, the manufacturer of Elastoplast, sent him a year's supply.

In 1934 Sayers went to London with his family. In 1935 Sayers gained membership of the Royal College of Physicians of London (MRCP). He and his family returned to New Zealand, where he established himself as a medical consultant in Auckland and he was appointed to the visiting staff of the Auckland Hospital. In 1938 he was a foundation fellow of the Royal Australasian College of Physicians (RACP).

== Service as military medical administrator ==
Following the outbreak of war, Sayers negotiated with Dr Alice Bush for her to take over his practice as a locum for the duration of the war. He enlisted with the rank of captain and on 1 May 1940 he was sent to the Middle East with No. 1 New Zealand General Hospital, as a physician and adviser on tropical medicine. In 1941 the 2nd Division 2 NZEF, was engaged in the retreat from Greece to Crete to North Africa.

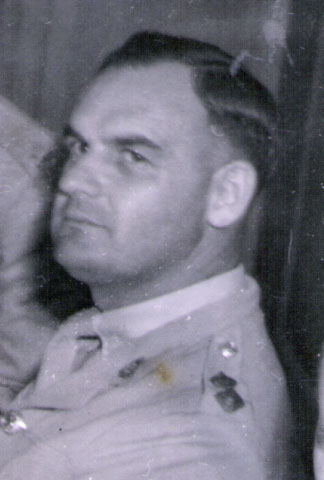
Sayers during World War II

In early April 1941 No. 1 General Hospital was located at Pharsala (Pharsalos or Pharsalus) now known as Farsala. In the chaotic withdrawal of troops from Greece the sisters, staff, and patients of No. 1 General Hospital were to be evacuated from the port of Piraeus. The officers and men embarked on MV Rawnsley on 19 April, but the ship missed its convoy and was machine-gunned and bombed by German aircraft. Captains Sayers and King accompanied the nurses, although they actually took much longer to leave Greece than the officers and men; the nurses expect to join the hospital ship Aba, but it left Piraeus before the designated time to avoid air attacks. The MV Rawnsley and the hospital ship Aba arrived in Alexandria on 23 April 1941. The nursing sisters, with Captains Sayers and King, arrived in Cairo on 1 May 1941, having travelled via Crete.

As a consequence of the loss of medical personnel in 2 NZEF during the Greece campaign, No. 1 General Hospital was not reformed as an active hospital until new personnel arrived. On 10 August 1941 Sayers, promoted to major, was placed in charge of the medical division of No. 1 General Hospital, which was located in the Cairo zone at Helwan, with the hospital acting as a base hospital during the North African campaigns of 1941–42.

Sayers was promoted to lieutenant-colonel and in November 1942 he was transferred from the Middle East to the Pacific to take charge of the medical division of No. 4 New Zealand General Hospital which was deployed to New Caledonia. As the consultant in tropical diseases, Sayers identified that providing a solution to the malaria problem was an important element in the conduct of the Pacific war. The anti-malarial precautions and training given to the New Zealand soldiers in the Solomon Islands campaign resulted in a low sickness rate from malaria of 3.19 per cent of the troops that entered zones in which malaria was prevalent. Sayers' contribution to the minimisation of deaths from malaria is acknowledged in the Official Histories of World War 2 of the New Zealand Forces and of the United States. His contribution to the American forces was acknowledged by the award of the Legion of Merit (U.S).

== Career in medical education ==
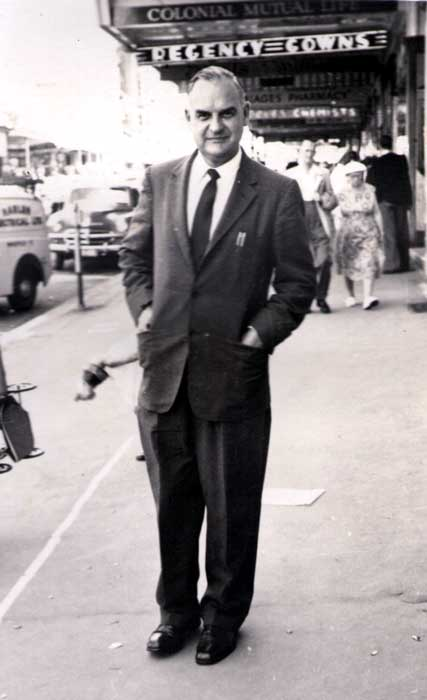
Sir Edward Sayers

At the end of the Pacific war, Sayers returned to Auckland where he was a physician in private practice and consultant to the Auckland Hospital. He carried out research into pollen-based allergies and produced serums to counteract the effect of these pollens; he had an extensive patient list of asthmatics in Auckland.

In the 1950s he became the sub-dean of the Auckland Branch Faculty at which final-year students of University of Otago, School of Medicine, completed their training. In 1958, on the retirement of Sir Charles Hercus, Sayers was appointed as dean of the University of Otago, School of Medicine, together with a chair in therapeutics. His inaugural lecture was on malaria, which was also the subject of his MD thesis that he completed in 1959.

As dean of the medical school he was involved in the revision of the clinical content of fourth- and fifth-year teaching and new chairs in psychological medicine and paediatrics were established during his tenure. He was involved in persuading the Wellcome Trust to establish a research chair in medicine and the funding of a building for medical research.

Sayers served on committees of the Royal Australasian College of Physicians (RACP), and was the first New Zealander to serve as president of the RACP from 1956 to 1958. He chaired the New Zealand Medical Council (1956–64) and he also served as president of the New Zealand branch of the British Medical Association (1963–64). He was appointed the colonel commandant of the Royal New Zealand Army Medical Corps (1964–67).

His services were recognised by the award of various honours. In the 1956 Queen's Birthday Honours, he was appointed a Companion of the Order of St Michael and St George, for public services as a prominent physician. He was elected a Fellow of the Royal Society of New Zealand in 1961, and he was made a Knight Bachelor in the 1965 New Year Honours. Later that same year he was appointed a Knight of the Order of St John. In 1975 he was awarded an honorary DSc by the University of Otago. He was also an Honorary Fellow of the Royal College of Physicians of Edinburgh and an Honorary Fellow of the American College of Physicians.

He retired from the University of Otago in 1968, although he continued with a consulting practice and was the chairman of the medical research distribution committee lottery fund and of the scientific committee of the National Heart Foundation. He died on 12 May 1985 in Dunedin.

== Publications ==
- Sayers, E. G. ( 1943) Malaria in the South Pacific with Special Reference to the Solomon Islands. New Zealand Government Printing Office (24 pages)
- Sayers, E. G. (1966) The staffing of clinical departments of the Medical School (44 pages)
- Sayers, E. G. Observations on Doctor Price's Revolution Sermon, University of Otago: graduation address ( 7 December 1967), Published 1970, University of Otago (66 pages)
