= Ghoi =

Island in Solomon Islands

Coordinates: 7°56′S 156°32′E

Ghoi is a small island in the New Georgia Islands group of Western Province, Solomon Islands, located north of Ranongga.
