= White-winged fantail =

Conservation status
- Least Concern (IUCN 3.1)

Scientific classification
- Kingdom: Animalia
- Phylum: Chordata
- Class: Aves
- Order: Passeriformes
- Family: Rhipiduridae
- Genus: Rhipidura
- Species: R. cockerelli

Binomial name
- Rhipidura cockerelli (Ramsay, EP, 1879)

Species of bird

The white-winged fantail (Rhipidura cockerelli) or Cockerell's fantail, is a species of bird in the family Rhipiduridae. It is found in the Solomon Islands apart from the island of Malaita in the southeast of the archipelago. The white-gorgeted fantail (Rhipidura coultasi) was formerly considered as a subspecies.

Its natural habitat is subtropical or tropical moist lowland forests. It is threatened by habitat loss.

== Taxonomy ==
The white-winged fantail was formally described in 1879 by the Australian ornithologist Edward Pierson Ramsay based on a specimen that had been collected by James F. Cockerell on Guadalcanal in the Solomon Islands. Ramsay coined the binomial name Sauloprocta cockerelli. The specific epithet was chosen to honour the collector. This species is now placed with the other fantails in the genus Rhipidura that was introduced in 1827 by the naturalists Nicholas Vigors and Thomas Horsfield.

Six subspecies are recognised:

- R. c. septentrionalis Rothschild & Hartert, EJO, 1916 – Buka Island, Bougainville Island and Shortland Islands (northwest Solomon Islands)
- R. c. interposita Rothschild & Hartert, EJO, 1916 – Choiseul Island and Santa Isabel Island (central east Solomon Islands)
- R. c. lavellae Rothschild & Hartert, EJO, 1916 – Vella Lavella and Ranongga (north New Georgia group, central west Solomon Islands)
- R. c. albina Rothschild & Hartert, EJO, 1901 – Kolombangara, Kohinggo, New Georgia, Vangunu, Rendova and Tetepare Islands (central, south New Georgia group, central west Solomon Islands)
- R. c. floridana Mayr, 1931 – Nggela Islands (Florida Islands) (central south Solomon Islands)
- R. c. cockerelli (Ramsay, EP, 1879) – Guadalcanal (central south Solomon Islands)

The white-gorgeted fantail (Rhipidura coultasi) was formerly treated as a subspecies. It is endemic to the island of Malaita in the southeast Solomon Islands.
