= Logha =

Island in Solomon Islands

Coordinates: 8°0′S 157°0′E

Logha is a small island in the New Georgia Islands group of Western Province, Solomon Islands, located to the east of Ghizo Island. The estimated terrain elevation above sea level is some 28 metres.

== See also ==
- Western Province topics
