= Kiambe =

Island in Solomon Islands

Coordinates: 8°19′41″S 157°16′15″E

Kiambe is a small island in the New Georgia Islands group of Western Province, Solomon Islands, located to the southeast of Munda.
