= Olasana Island =

Island in Solomon Islands

- Interactive map of Olasana Island

Geography
- Location: Solomon Islands
- Coordinates: 8°07′55″S 156°54′31″E
- Archipelago: New Georgia Islands
- Area: 0.079 km^{2} (0.031 sq mi)

Demographics
- Population: 0

Olasana Island is a 7.93-hectare, uninhabited island in the New Georgia Islands, in Western Province, in the independent nation of Solomon Islands. The island is primarily notable for its role in the events after the sinking of PT-109 involving future American president John F. Kennedy.

== PT-109 ==
Shortly after midnight on August 2, 1943, an American torpedo patrol boat, PT-109, was struck by a Japanese warship, killing two. As the ship began to sink, the remaining crew swam to what is now known as Kennedy Island. Subsequently the wounded crew made a swim and changed to Olasana Island. Finding only coconuts but no water, Kennedy and another crew member swam to Naru Island and then canoed back some supplies to Olasana. They would there come across locals Biuku Gasa and Eroni Kumana, which precipitated their rescue.

== See also ==
- Kennedy Island
- Naru Island (Solomon Islands)
