= Mondomondo =

Island in Solomon Islands

- Interactive map of Mondomondo

Geography
- Location: South Pacific
- Coordinates: 8°14′09″S 157°47′58″E
- Archipelago: New Georgia Islands

Administration
- Solomon Islands
- Province: Western Province

Mondomondo is an island in Western Province, Solomon Islands, lying off the east coast of New Georgia Island.

== See also ==
- Western Province topics
