= Akara Island =

Island in Solomon Islands

Akara
- Interactive map of Akara

Geography
- Location: South Pacific
- Coordinates: 8°39′08″S 157°48′06″E
- Archipelago: New Georgia Islands
- Length: 8.9 km (5.53 mi)

Administration
- Solomon Islands
- Province: Western Province

Demographics
- Population: 0

Akara is an island of the New Georgia archipelago in the Western Province of the Solomon Islands, in the South Pacific east of Papua New Guinea.

== Geography ==
The island is located in the Blanche Channel, a waterway in the southeastern part of the archipelago that separates the islands of New Georgia and Vangunu in the northeast from the islands of Rendova and Tetepare in the southwest. Akara is separated from the southern foothills of New Georgia by a narrow waterway. The island is uninhabited.
