= Lola Island =

Island in Solomon Islands

Coordinates: 8°18′S 157°10′E

Lola Island is an island within the Vona Vona Lagoon southeast of Vonavona Island in Western Province, Solomon Islands.

== Zipolo Habu Resort ==
In 1989, Joe and Lisa Entrikin commenced operation of a commercial tourism operation on Lola Island named Zipolo Habu Resort.

Zipolo Habu Resort has 6 bungalows ranging from 'Traditional' to 'Deluxe', a restaurant and bar. The resort provides fishing charters, surfing and diving trips and numerous day tours throughout the region.

The resort is accessible by a 20-minute boat ride from Munda Domestic Airport or Noro wharf. Boat transfers can also be arranged from Gizo

== Anchorage for yachts and ships ==
Lola Island also provides a safe anchorage point for yachts and ships whilst visiting the Solomon Islands

== Surfing ==
There are two right-hand surf breaks within short distance from Lola Island – 'Skull Island and Desperates'. These breaks are known to be good for surfing intermittently throughout the year.

== Access to 'Skull Island' Warrior Chief Shrine ==
A small Island close to Lola Island, 'Skull Island' is one of the most sacred areas in the region. Visitable by tourists, it provides an insight into the fierce 'head hunting' history of local warriors. The owners of Zipolo Habu Resort on Lola Island support the traditional owners of 'Skull Island' by assisting in the collection of a kastom fee from those wishing to visit the shrine.
