= Mbulo Island =

Island in Solomon Islands

Coordinates: 8°46′S 158°17′E

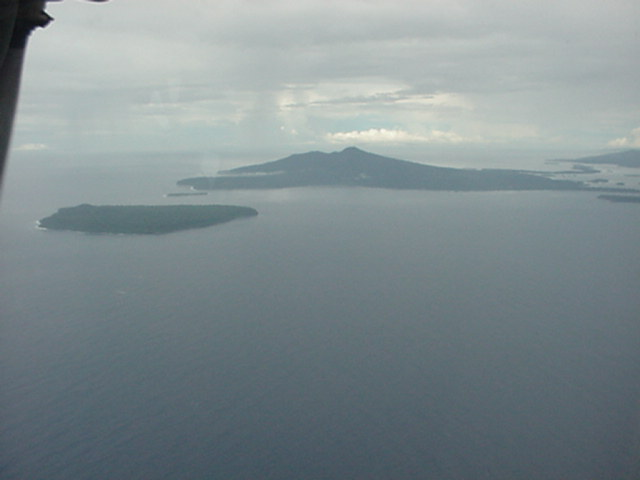
Mbulo Island on the left, Nggatokae Island in center

Mbulo is an island in the New Georgia Islands group of Western Province, Solomon Islands, lying east of Nggatokae Island. Mbulo is heavily forested with a volcanic center. The terrain elevation above sea level has been estimated to be about 125 metres, but SRTM data suggests a maximum elevation of about 240 metres.
