= Matikuri =

Island in Solomon Islands

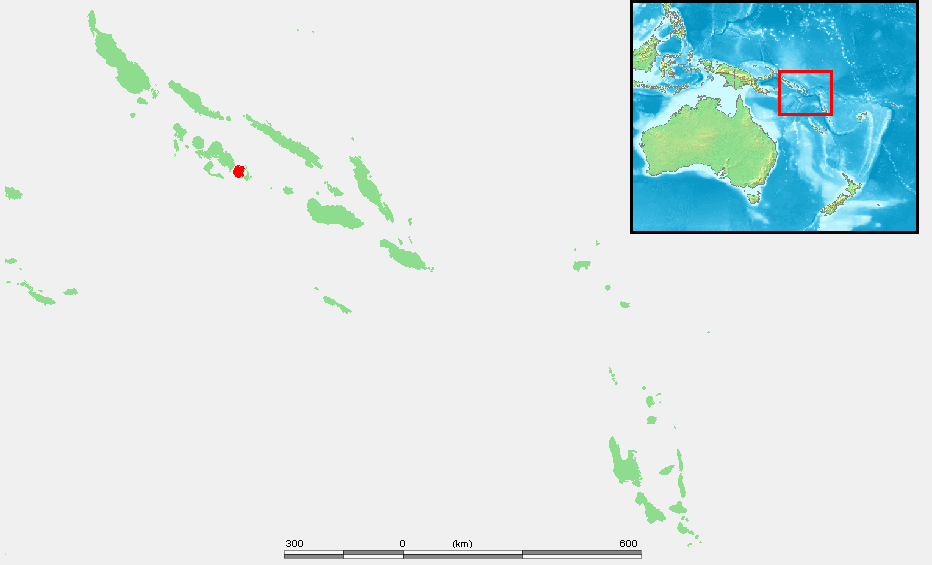

Geography
- Location: South Pacific
- Coordinates: 8°37′33″S 157°58′54″E
- Archipelago: New Georgia Islands

Administration
- Solomon Islands
- Province: Western Province

Matikuri is an island in Western Province, Solomon Islands. Matikuri Island is off the west coast of Vangunu Island, an extinct volcano.

== See also ==
- Western Province topics
