= Telina =

Island in Solomon Islands

Coordinates: 9°54′0″S 160°39′0″E

Telina is an island in Marovo Lagoon, New Georgia Islands in Western Province, in the independent nation of Solomon Islands.
