= United Church in Solomon Islands =

The United Church in Solomon Islands is a Reformed congregational Christian denomination in Solomon Islands.

== History ==
The first Australian missionaries were sent to the Solomon Islands archipelago in 1902 by the Methodist Missionary Society. The Methodists expanded mission in the Western Islands, Munda Point and Bougainville. Later, in 1968 the Methodist church united in Papua New Guinea and the Solomon Islands, to form the United Church in Papua New Guinea and the Solomon Islands.

The Bougainville congregations straddled the political divide. In the Western Solomon Islands the London Missionary Society gained majority. It was an agreement between the Methodists and the LMS people. The United Church acquired people of Reformed background too. After independence, the area became known as the sovereign nation of Solomon Islands. In 1978, a movement in Bougainville seeking secession from Papua New Guinea disrupted communication with within the church.

Half of the church in Solomon Islands and in Papua New Guinea separated from the Church in 1996 when the new United Church in Solomon Islands was formed.

== Statistics ==
In 2016, it had 50,000 members and 300 congregations.

By 2026, the church had 50,000 members, with 73 pastors serving 191 congregations.

== Interchurch relationships ==
In 2026, the church is a member of the Pacific Conference of Churches and the Council for World Mission.

It has also been a member of the World Communion of Reformed Churches and the World Council of Churches.

== See also ==
- John Francis Goldie
