= Naru Island =

Naru Island may refer to

- Naru Island (Japan)
- Naru Island (Solomon Islands)
