= Kingguru =

Island in Solomon Islands

Coordinates: 8.764°S 158.125°E

Kingguru is a small island in the New Georgia Islands group of Western Province, Solomon Islands, located to the west of Nggatokae Island .
