= Liapari =

Island in Solomon Islands

Coordinates: 7.953°S 156.711°E

Liapari is an island in Western Province, in the independent nation of Solomon Islands.

== Geography ==
Liapari Island is located to the southeast of Vella Lavella Island. There are remains of a U. S. Navy-built road.

== See also ==
- Western Province topics
