= Ghizo Island =

Island in Solomon Islands

Coordinates: 8°5′S 156°50′E

Ghizo
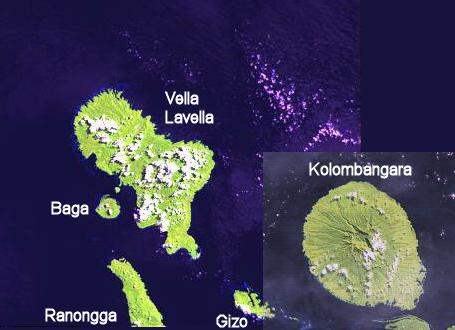
- Location in the New Georgia Islands

Geography
- Location: South Pacific Ocean
- Archipelago: New Georgia Islands; Solomon Islands
- Length: 11 km (6.8 mi)
- Width: 5 km (3.1 mi)
- Highest elevation: 180 m (590 ft)
- Highest point: Maringe Hill

Administration
- Solomon Islands
- Province: Western Province

Demographics
- Population: 7,177 (2019)

Ghizo Island lies in the Western Province of Solomon Islands, west of New Georgia and Kolombangara, and is home to the provincial capital, Gizo. The island is named after an infamous local head-hunter.

Ghizo is relatively small when compared to the surrounding islands, the island is 11 kilometres (6.8 mi) long and 5 kilometres (3.1 mi) wide, with a summit elevation of 180 metres (590 ft) (Maringe Hill).

The local language is Bilua language.

== History ==
Ghizo is home to a substantial number of people of I-Kiribati descent. These people were relocated there by the British administration of the British Solomon Islands Protectorate (now the nation state of Solomon Islands) in the 1950s. They had previously spent 20 years on the islands of Orona (Hull Island) and Nikumaroro (Gardener Island), having been resettled on these previously uninhabited islands in the Phoenix Group from various islands in the Gilberts archipelago in the 1930s. The original resettlement in the 1930s was on alleged grounds of overcrowding, particularly on drought prone islands in the southern Gilberts. The second resettlement was on alleged grounds of the islands in the Phoenix group having harsh living conditions and also prone to drought, although remoteness and costs falling on the colonial administration also played parts. (See also Wagina Island.)

== Environment ==
The whole of the island and its surrounding waters, with a total area of 12,862 hectares (31,783 acres), has been identified by BirdLife International as an Important Bird Area (IBA) because it supports populations of several threatened or endemic bird species. These include Melanesian scrubfowl, red-knobbed imperial pigeons, buff-headed coucals, Sanford's sea eagles, Solomons cockatoos, cardinal lories, song parrots and Gizo white-eyes. Threats to the site come from logging and forest clearance.
