= Simbo =

Island in Solomon Islands

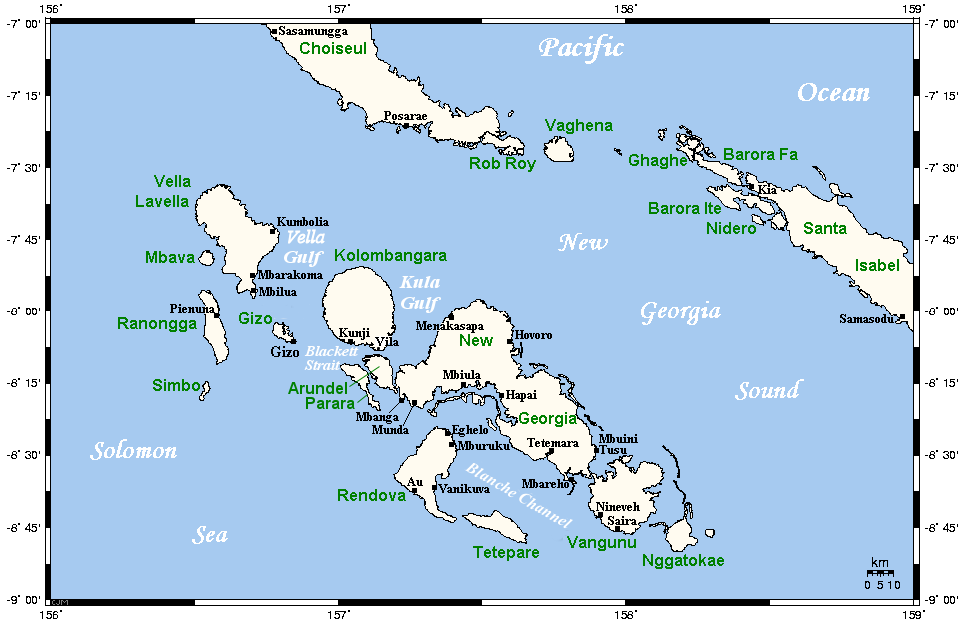
- New Georgia Islands; Simbo at left

Highest point
- Elevation: 335 m (1,099 ft)
- Coordinates: 8°17′30″S 156°31′0″E

Geography
- Location: New Georgia Islands, Solomon Islands

Geology
- Mountain type: Stratovolcanoes
- Volcanic arc: Solomon Islands
- Last eruption: 1910 ± 10 years

Simbo is an island in Western Province, Solomon Islands. It was known to early Europeans as Eddystone Island. The islanders have their unique language spoken nowhere else.

== Geography ==
Simbo is actually two main islands, one small island called Nusa Simbo separated by a saltwater lagoon from a larger one. Collectively the islands are known to the local people as Mandegugusu, while in the rest of the Solomons the islands are referred to as Simbo. Simbo has an active volcano called Ove as well several saltwater lagoons and a freshwater lake.

== 2007 earthquake and tsunami ==
On April 2, 2007, Simbo was hit by a massive earthquake and tsunami which is now known as the 2007 Solomon Islands earthquake. A 12 m tsunami destroyed two villages, Tapurai and Riquru, on the northern side of the island. Even though the tsunami hit the villages just minutes after the earthquake nearly everyone in the villages ran for safety before the waves hit without any modern warning system. Their astonishing response was probably due to a combination of deep ecological knowledge of the coastal waters as well as an uncanny capacity to sense the impeding danger. Of those who perished, most of them were seen returning to their dwellings to retrieve money or other valuables despite warnings from others to flee.

== In popular culture ==
Some of the historic cultural practices on Simbo are referenced in The Ghost Road, a novel by Pat Barker about World War I. The author used the research of Arthur Maurice Hocart and the psychoanalyst William Rivers.
