= Guadalcanal white-eye =

Scientific classification
- Kingdom: Animalia
- Phylum: Chordata
- Class: Aves
- Order: Passeriformes
- Family: Zosteropidae
- Genus: Zosterops
- Species: Z. oblitus

Binomial name
- Zosterops oblitus Hartert, 1929
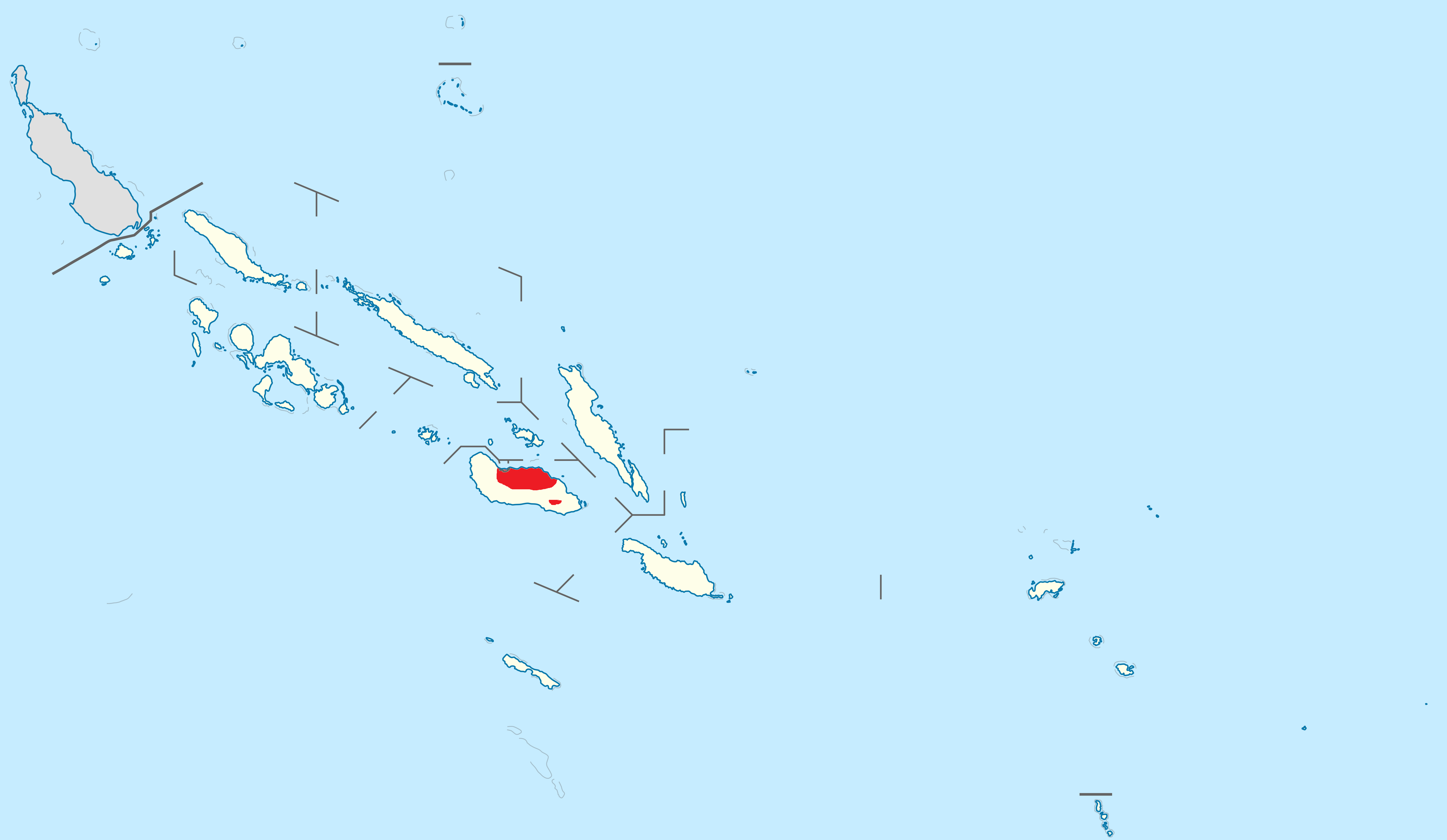
- Distribution of the Guadalcanal White-eye in a map of the Solomon Islands

Species of bird

The Guadalcanal white-eye (Zosterops oblitus) is a species of bird in the family Zosteropidae. It is found on Guadalcanal. Its natural habitat is in subtropical or tropical moist montane forests. The Guadalcanal white-eye was formerly considered a subspecies of the grey-throated white-eye (Zosterops fuscicapilla).
