= Uepi =

Island in Solomon Islands

Coordinates: 8.422°S 157.940°E

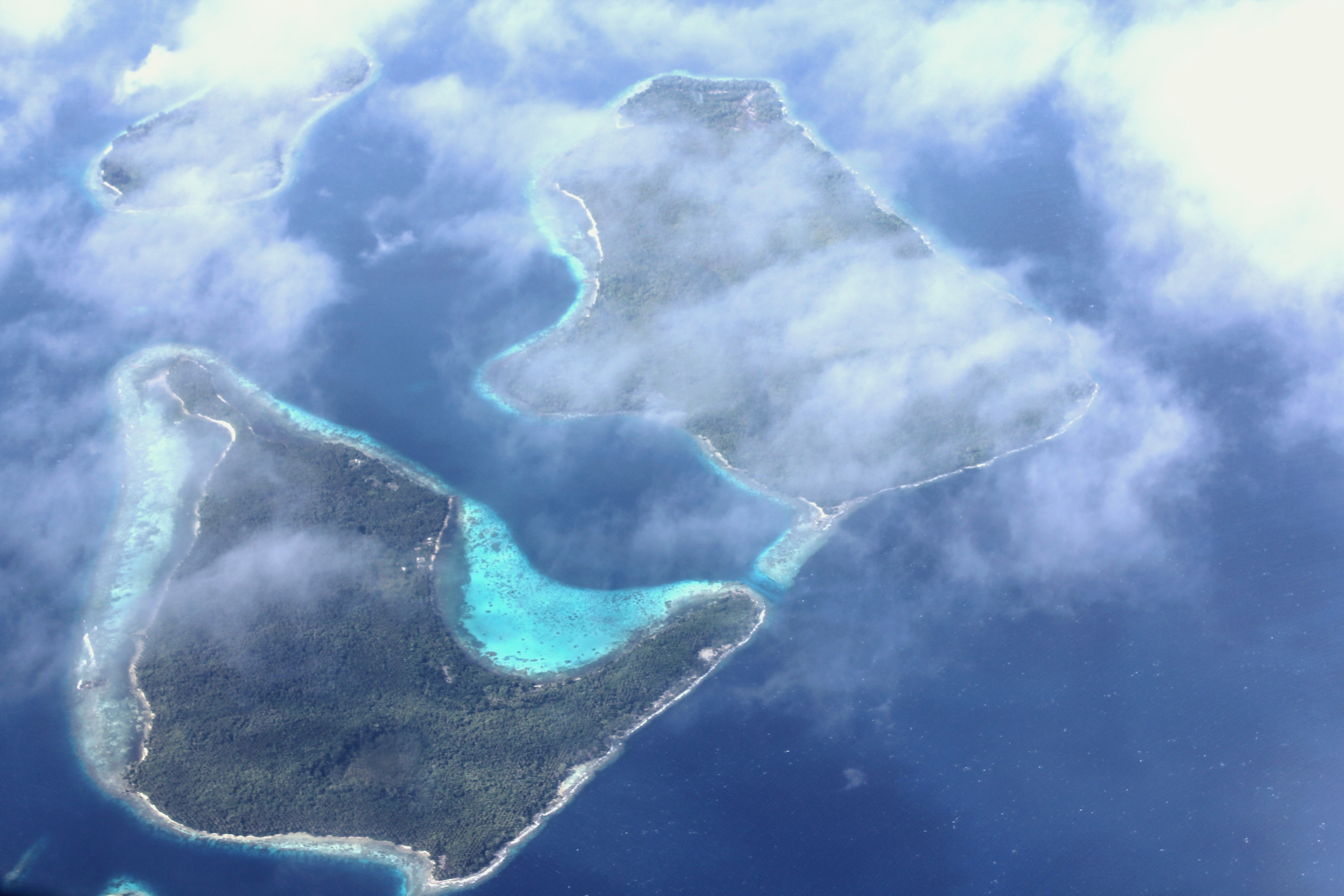
Aerial view of Uepi.

Uepi is an island in Western Province, in the independent nation of Solomon Islands. It is noted for its high quality blue-water drop-off scuba diving.

== Geography ==
Uepi is a classic raised barrier reef island, covered by rainforest, outlined by fringing reef and sandy beaches. The island is flanked by the warm lagoon waters on one side, and the oceanic depths (6,000 ft; 1,800 m) of "The Slot", a deep marine abyss, on the other. Uepi Island is approximately 2.5 km long and 300 metres wide. Uepi is only 90 minutes from Honiara by plane and boat.
