= Nusa Roviana =

Nusa Roviana Nusa Rubiana
- Town
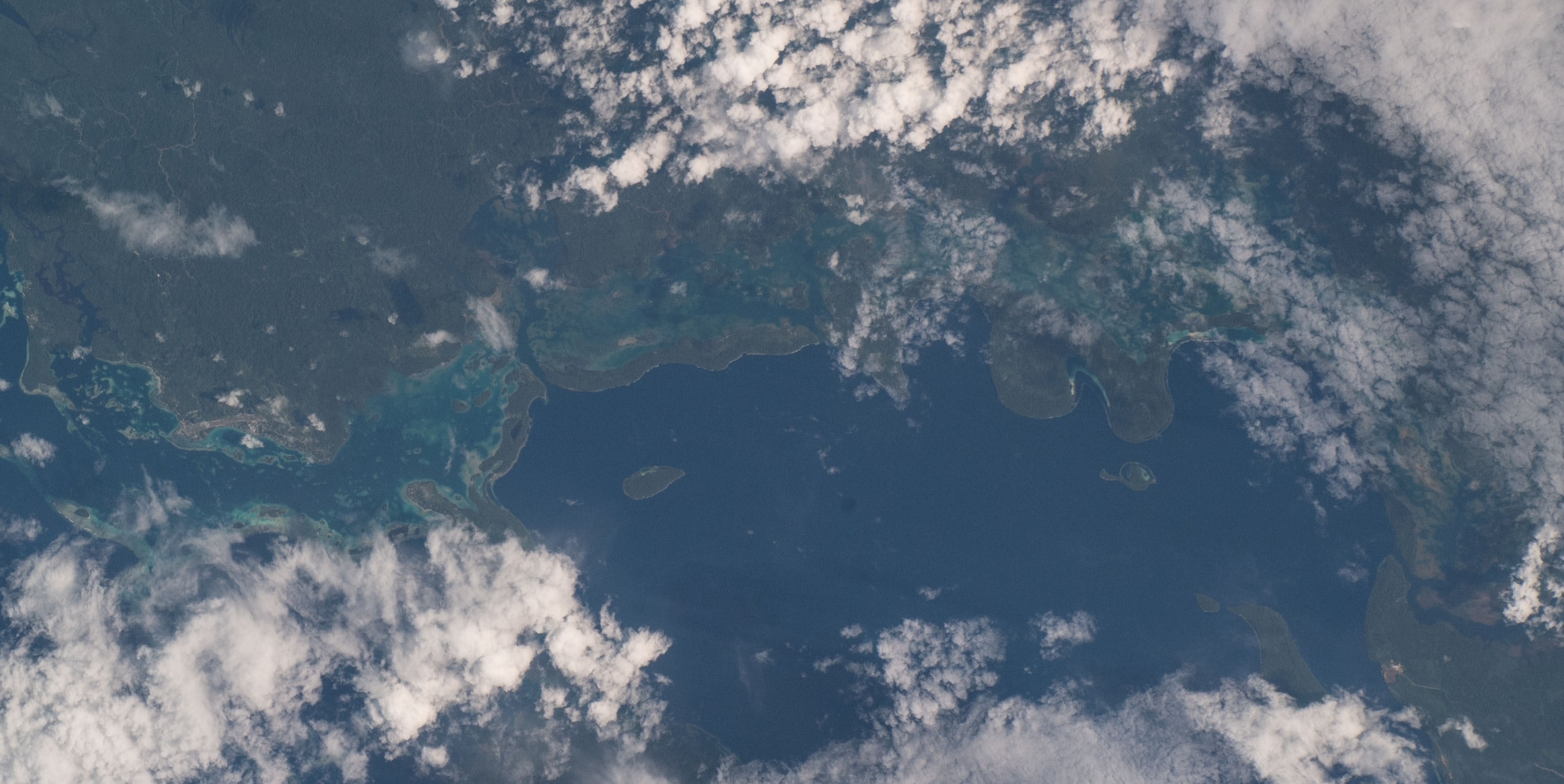
- Nusa Roviana and Roviana Island as seen from the ISS (left)

- Location in Solomon Islands
- Coordinates: 8°20′39″S 157°18′36″E
- Country: Solomon Islands
- Province: Western Province
- Island: Roviana

Population (2019)
  - Total: 1,396
- Time zone: UTC+11 (Solomon Islands Time)

Nusa Roviana is a town in Western Province in Solomon Islands. The town is located on Roviana Island, which is across the Roviana Lagoon from the town of Munda, located about 2.6 km (1.62 mi) away. Roviana Island is a barrier island located on the western end of New Georgia. As of 2019, the town had a population of 1,396.

== History ==
The pre-European Nusa Roviana fortress, along with its surrounding villages and shrines served as a religious and a trade hub in the region between the 17th and 19th centuries. This area saw the rise of many religious rituals, including headhunting and the creation of shell valuables. Oral tradition states that the population of the New Georgia coastline and the barrier islands originates from the area of the Bao megalithic shrine complex, located inland from the town of Munda around the 16th to 17th centuries. The fortress was built upon the remains of an earlier fortress dating to the 13th to 14th centuries. The fortress is 600 metres long, and goes up to 3 metres in height. The walls are made of coral.

In 1993, members of a christian sect threw out the skulls of the former Nusa Roviana chiefs at the Olobuki shrine, and destroyed it. Excavation at the Nusa Roviana fortress began towards the 1990s.
