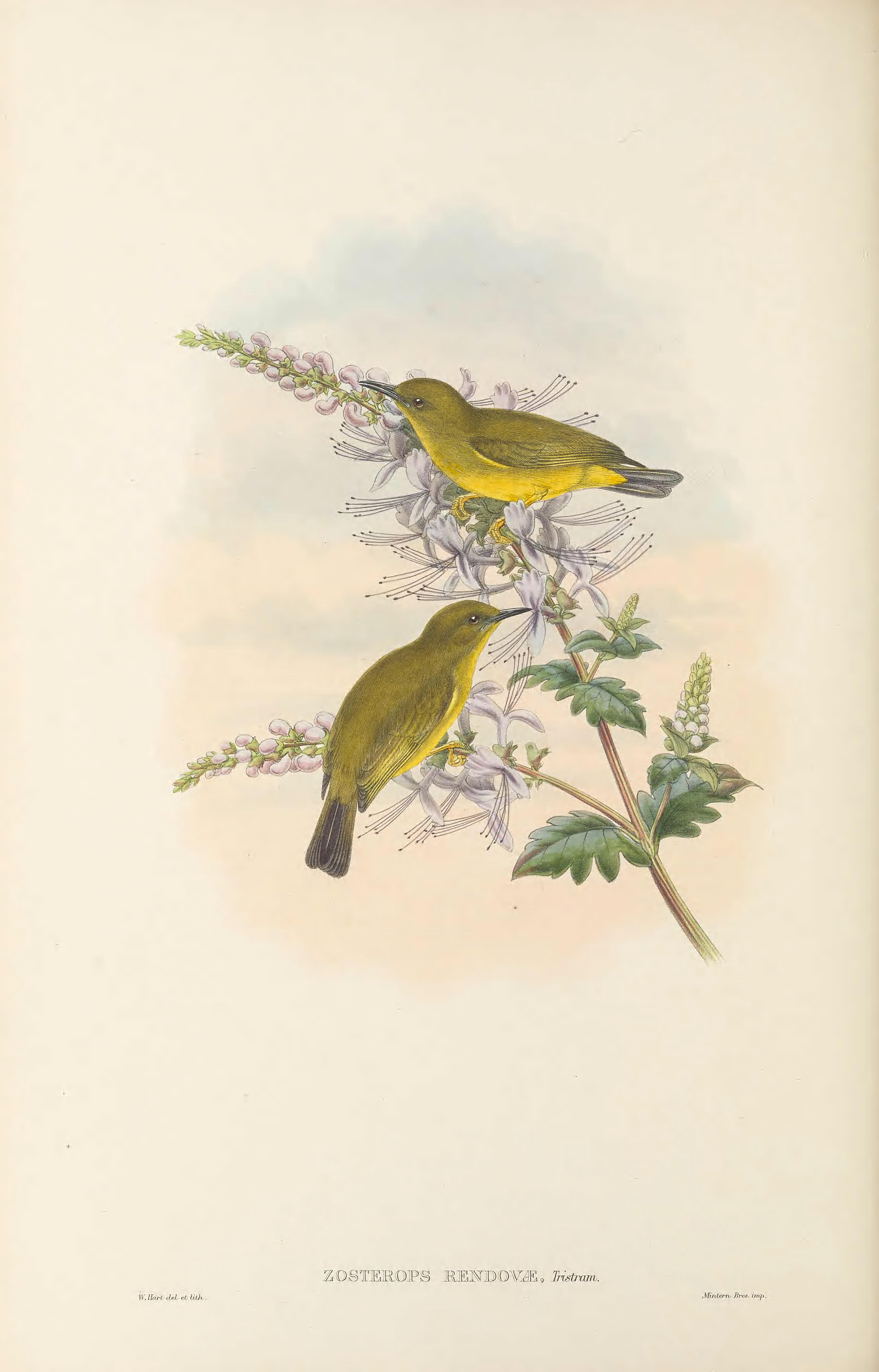

Conservation status
- Least Concern (IUCN 3.1)

Scientific classification
- Kingdom: Animalia
- Phylum: Chordata
- Class: Aves
- Order: Passeriformes
- Family: Zosteropidae
- Genus: Zosterops
- Species: Z. rendovae

Binomial name
- Zosterops rendovae Tristram, 1882
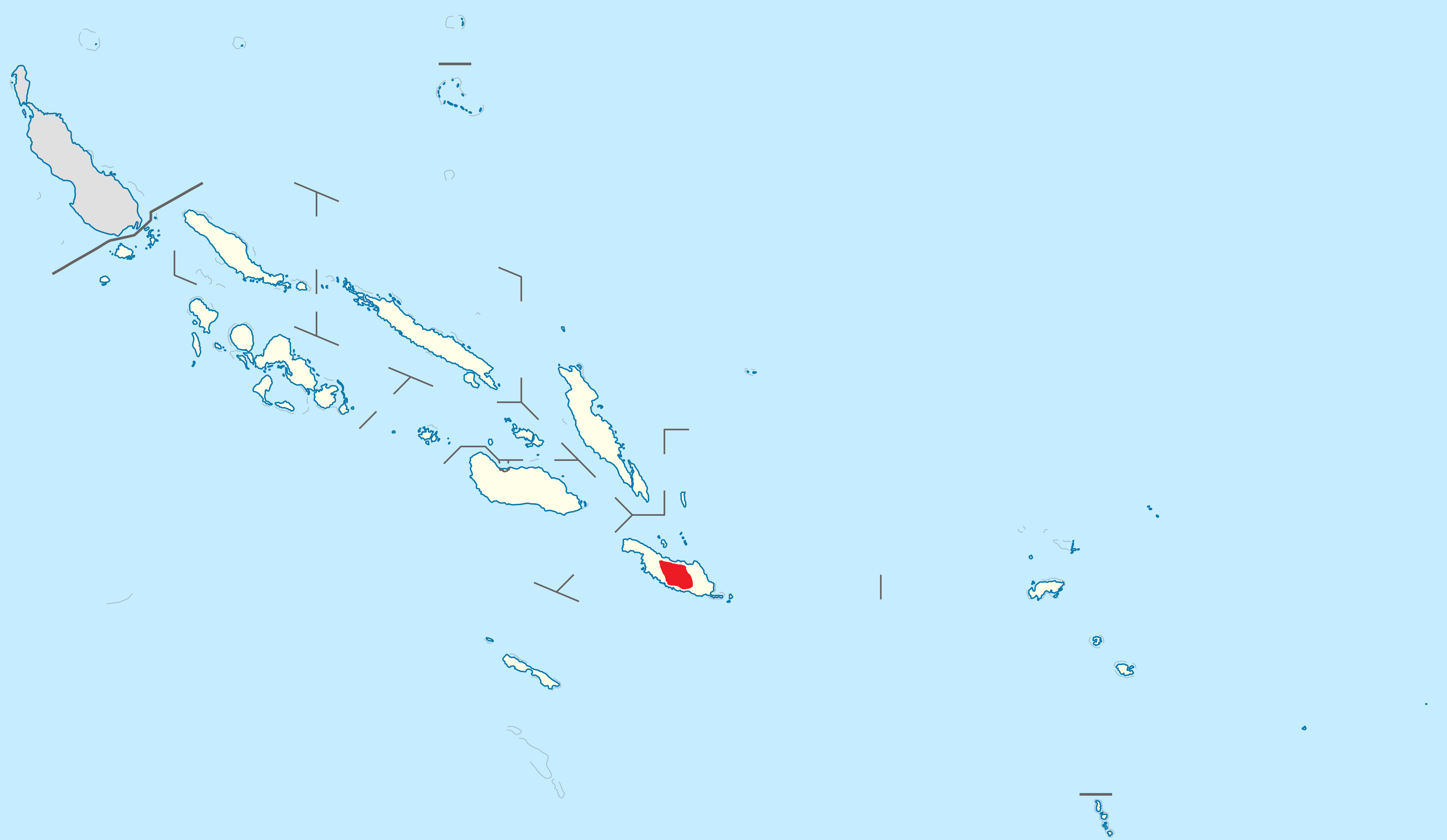

Synonyms
- Zosterops ugiensis

= Makira white-eye =

Species of bird

The Makira white-eye (Zosterops rendovae), also known as the grey-throated white-eye, is a small passerine bird in the white-eye family, Zosteropidae. It is also known as Zosterops ugiensis because Z. rendovae has often been used for the Solomons white-eye (Z. kulambangrae).

It is endemic to the island of Makira in the Solomon Islands archipelago. The Guadalcanal white-eye (Z. oblitus) on Guadalcanal and Bougainville white-eye (Z. hamlini) on Bougainville were formerly considered subspecies, but are now considered distinct species. It inhabits primary forest, mainly at 900–2000 m above sea-level but small numbers occur at lower levels.

It is a small bird, 12–13 cm long. It is fairly dark green above with a brownish tail, a variable dark brown area between the eye and bill and a narrow white ring around the eye. The underparts are dark grey apart from the green chin, pale centre to the belly and yellow undertail-coverts. The bill is blackish with a pale base to the lower mandible.
