= White-gorgeted fantail =

Conservation status
- Near Threatened (IUCN 3.1)

Scientific classification
- Kingdom: Animalia
- Phylum: Chordata
- Class: Aves
- Order: Passeriformes
- Family: Rhipiduridae
- Genus: Rhipidura
- Species: R. coultasi

Binomial name
- Rhipidura coultasi Mayr, 1931

Species of bird

The white-gorgeted fantail (Rhipidura coultasi) is a species of bird in the family Rhipiduridae. It is endemic to the island of Malaita in the Solomon Islands. It was formerly considered as a subspecies of the white-winged fantail. Its natural habitat is subtropical or tropical moist lowland forests. It is threatened by habitat loss.

== Taxonomy ==
The white-gorgeted fantail was formally described in 1931 by the American ornithologist Ernst Mayr based on specimens collected by William Ferrell Coultas and Walter Jakob Eyerdam on the island of Malaita in the Solomon Islands. Mayr considered the taxon as a subspecies of the white-winged fantail and coined the trinomial name Rhipidura cockerelli coultasi, choosing the specific epithet to honour one of the collectors. The white-gorgeted fantail is now considered as a separate species. It is monotypic: no subspecies are recognised.

== Description ==
Compared to the white-winged fantail the white-gorgeted fantail is larger with a grey rather a black back. The inner secondaries are brownish black with a very narrow whitish edge. The lower throat is white rather than black and the drop-shaped spots on the breast are larger.
