= Simbo language =

Austronesian language spoken in the Solomon Islands

Simbo
- Native to: Solomon Islands
- Region: Simbo
- Native speakers: (2,700 cited 1999)
- Language family: Austronesian: Malayo-Polynesian; Oceanic; Northwest Solomonic; New Georgia – Ysabel; New Georgia; Simbo

Language codes
- ISO 639-3: sbb
- Glottolog: simb1256

Simbo is an Oceanic language spoken by about 2,700 people on Simbo, Solomon Islands.
