= Gizo white-eye =

Conservation status
- Vulnerable (IUCN 3.1)

Scientific classification
- Kingdom: Animalia
- Phylum: Chordata
- Class: Aves
- Order: Passeriformes
- Family: Zosteropidae
- Genus: Zosterops
- Species: Z. luteirostris

Binomial name
- Zosterops luteirostris Hartert, 1904

Species of bird

The Gizo white-eye or yellow-billed white-eye (Zosterops luteirostris) is a species of bird in the family Zosteropidae.

== Distribution ==
It is endemic to Ghizo Island.

Its natural habitats are subtropical or tropical moist lowland forest and plantations.

== Conservation ==
Zosterops luteirostris is a vulnerable species threatened by habitat loss.
