= Kashi Maru =

Japanese auxiliary minelayer, now a dive site in the Solomon Islands

Coordinates: 8°06′S 157°20′E

History

Japan
- Name: Kashi Maru
- Builder: Osaka Iron Works, Sakurajima
- Launched: 21 March 1940
- Completed: 30 April 1940
- Fate: Bombed and sunk, 2 July 1943

General characteristics
- Type: Cargo ship
- Tonnage: 654 GRT
- Displacement: 1,365 long tons (1,387 t)
- Length: 52.43 m (172 ft 0 in)
- Beam: 8.6 m (28 ft 3 in)
- Draught: 4.18 m (13 ft 9 in)
- Propulsion: 1 × 6-cylinder 4-stroke 550 hp (410 kW) diesel engine
- Speed: 11.5 knots (21.3 km/h; 13.2 mph)
- Complement: 20

Kasi Maru or Kashi Maru (橿丸, Kashi Maru; "live oak") was a Japanese auxiliary minelayer/merchant ship, sunk in Mbaeroko Bay, near Munda, during a World War II bombing raid on 2 July 1943.

Kashi Maru was built in 1940 at the Osaka Iron Works. The ship was unloading a cargo of fuel and vehicles when she was attacked and sunk by USAAF B-25 bombers, escorted by USN F4U fighters.

The site of the shipwreck is popular for divers, and was featured in the Nature episode "War Wrecks of the Coral Seas".
