= Bougainville white-eye =

Conservation status
- Least Concern (IUCN 3.1)

Scientific classification
- Kingdom: Animalia
- Phylum: Chordata
- Class: Aves
- Order: Passeriformes
- Family: Zosteropidae
- Genus: Zosterops
- Species: Z. hamlini

Binomial name
- Zosterops hamlini Murphy, 1929

Species of bird

The Bougainville white-eye (Zosterops hamlini) is a species of bird in the family Zosteropidae. It is endemic to Bougainville Island in Papua New Guinea. Its natural habitat is subtropical or tropical moist montane forests.

The Bougainville white-eye was formerly considered a subspecies of the grey-throated white-eye (Zosterops fuscicapilla). Additionally, Z. rendovae and Z. hamlini were believed to be one bird, collectively put under the name of the former, Z. rendovae.

== Habitat ==
The Bougainville white-eye lives mostly in the subtropical to tropical moist montane forests of Bougainville Island, which they are endemic to. As they are endemic to an island, their extent of occurrence is only 3,600 km^{2} (890,000 acres). They live at an elevation of 900–1,950 m (2,950–6,400 ft) above sea level. There has only been a 0.8% decrease in tree cover, and so it is suspected that the population size is stable.

== Description and behavior ==
Mature adults weigh around 17.2 g (0.61 oz). The average lifespan is 2.1 years, though some have lived to around nine. They are of reproductive age at 0.9 years.

They are mostly olive-green above with a yellow undertail. Their belly, chest, and throat are grey. They have a smudgy black patch in front of their eye, in addition to a bright white eye-ring typical of species in Zosterops. They look similar to the yellow-throated white-eye, but their upperparts are less yellow, and their throat is greyer.

The Bougainville white-eye exists in the herbivore trophic level and their trophic niche is that of an omnivore.

Bougainville white-eyes are non-migratory and sedentary.
