= Ranongga =

Island in Solomon Islands

Coordinates: 8.062°S 156.568°E

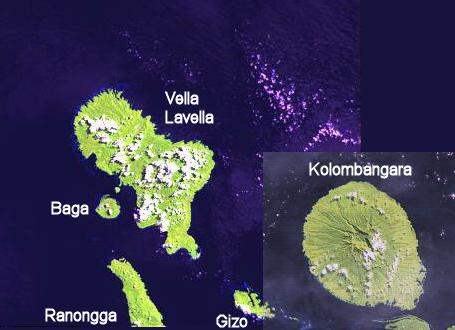
Landsat composite image of the southwestern New Georgia Islands

Ranongga is an island located in the New Georgia Islands group of Western Province, Solomon Islands.

== History ==
Ranongga was sighted in 1787 by sailors Read and Dale.

On August 18, 1959, a seismic sea wave was generated off the west coast of Ranongga Island, at 08 hr 05 min. Soon after, large waves were observed in Vori, on the northern coast of the island. The sea receded by 15m and then returned to its original position. In May 2007 there was another large earthquake, and tsunami, and the whole Island lifted out of the sea by 3 metres, and stayed there, exposing all of the reefs around the Island, making life very hard for the locals for some time after.

== Geography ==
Ranongga is a 28 km (17 mi) long, narrow island, located 8 km (5 mi) north-east of Simbo Island and south-west of Gizo, the capital of Western Province. The highest point is Mt. Kela (869m)

=== 2007 earthquake ===
In April 2007, an earthquake rocked Ranongga Island, along with many parts of Solomon Islands. Land thrust from the quake extended out the shoreline of Ranongga Island by up to 70 metres (230 ft) according to local residents. This has left many once pristine coral reefs exposed on the newly formed beaches.

== Demographics ==
Most of the villages are situated on the eastern side of the island. The Ghanongga language is spoken by about 2,500 people on Ranongga Island.
