= Vonavona =

Island in Western Province, Solomon Islands

Coordinates: 8°14′01″S 157°04′31″E

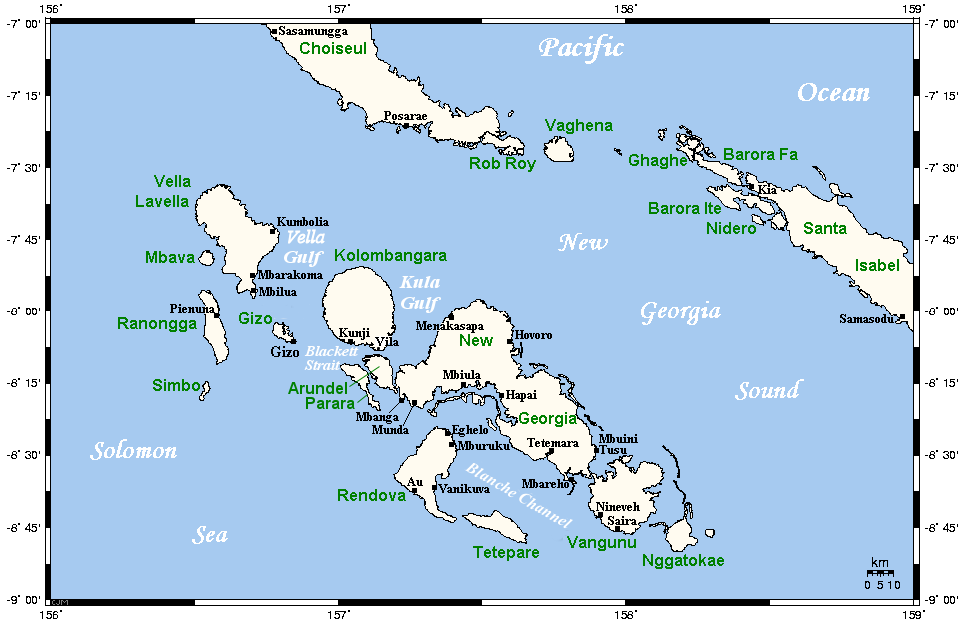
Location of the island in the New Georgia Group

Vonavona is an island in Western Province, Solomon Islands. Alternative local names and spellings of the island are Parara and Wanawana. The estimated terrain elevation above sea level is some 21 metres (69 ft). Vonavona borders Ferguson Passage to the west, Arundel Island to the east, and the island of Kolombangara to the north.
