= Kennedy Island =

Small island in Western Province, Solomon Islands

Coordinates: 8°6′46″S 156°54′20″E

Location of Kennedy Island in the Pacific Ocean

Kennedy Island (local name Kasolo Island, also known as Plum Pudding Island), is a 1.17 hectares (2.9 acres), uninhabited island in Solomon Islands that was named after John F. Kennedy, following an incident involving Kennedy during his World War II naval career. Kennedy Island lies 15 minutes by boat from Gizo, the provincial capital of the Western Province of Solomon Islands.

== History ==
=== PT-109 incident ===
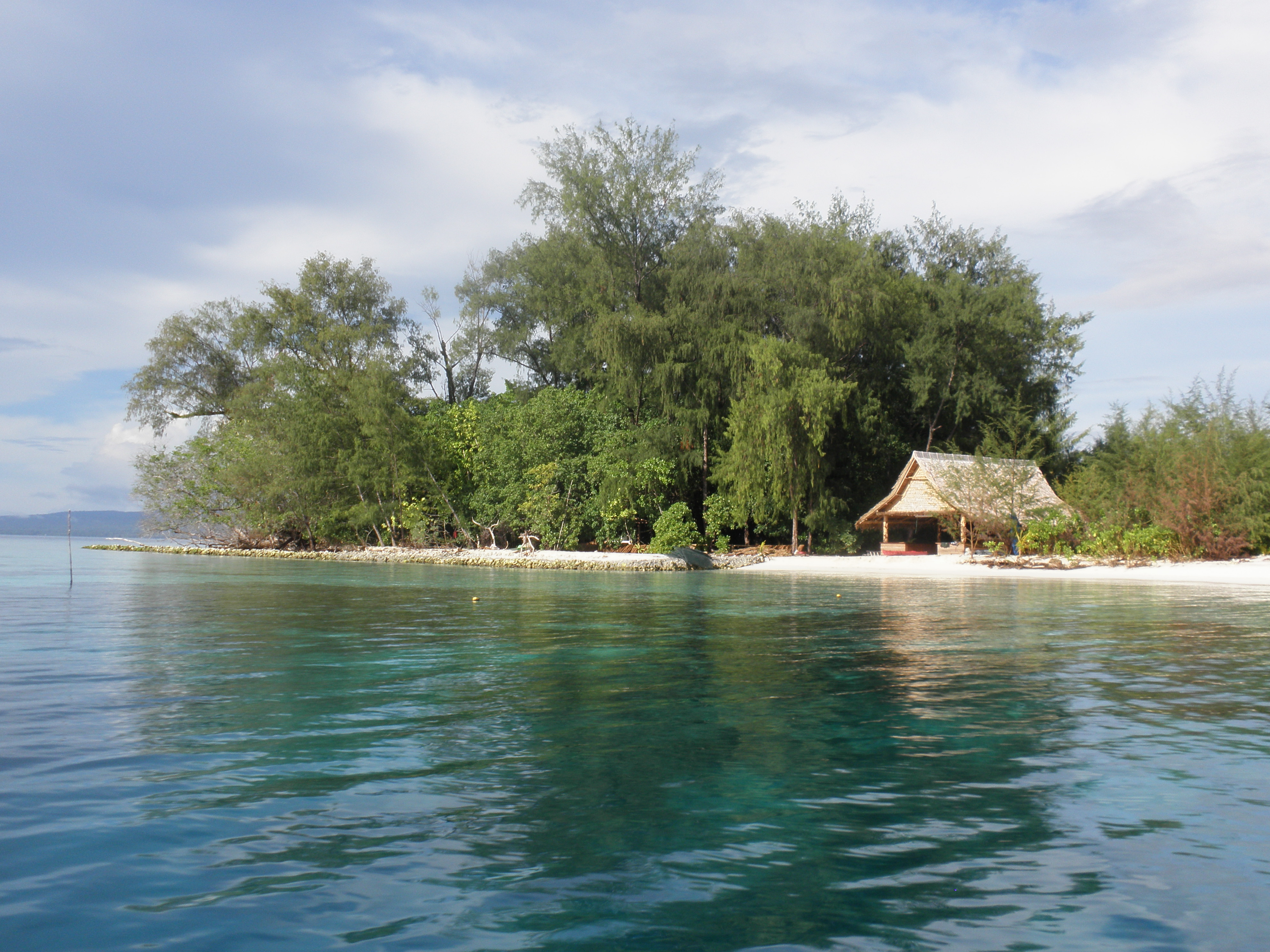
Kennedy Island in 2012

The island is notable for its role in the story of PT-109, part of the Pacific Ocean theater of World War II. In August 1943, it was to this island that the crew of the ship, commanded by then Lieutenant Kennedy, swam after their craft was rammed and sunk by the Japanese destroyer Amagiri. Two American sailors died in the incident. Kennedy later had the crew swim to the larger Olasana Island where they were found and helped by Melanesian scouts, Biuku Gasa and Eroni Kumana, dispatched by coastwatcher Reg Evans.

A small shrine to Kennedy, built by Solomon Islander Eroni Kumana who aided in the rescue of the crew, stands on the island.

=== Recent history ===
The island remains uninhabited, but is a tourist attraction. In 2003, a race was held where participants re-enacted Kennedy's swim.

Previously a public area, it was acquired in 2004 at a cost of SI$7000 (US$950) by Joseph Douglas, an advisor to then Caretaker Premier of Western Province Clement Base. The legality of the sale was the subject of a legal challenge. In 2009, Douglas sold Kennedy Island to Gizo Hotel (owned by Australian Shane Kennedy), one year after brother Dan Kennedy purchased the resort closest to Kennedy Island (Fatboys on Mbabanga Island).

In August 2023, U.S. Ambassador to Australia and daughter of President Kennedy Caroline Kennedy and her son Jack Schlossberg recreated part of President Kennedy’s historic swim following the sinking of PT-109. Joined by a team of Solomon Islander swimmers, the Ambassador and Jack swam about 1.2km between Naru and Olasana Islands — a passage that President Kennedy swam multiple times in the days after the sinking of PT-109 to bring his crew supplies and communicate with the Solomon Scouts.

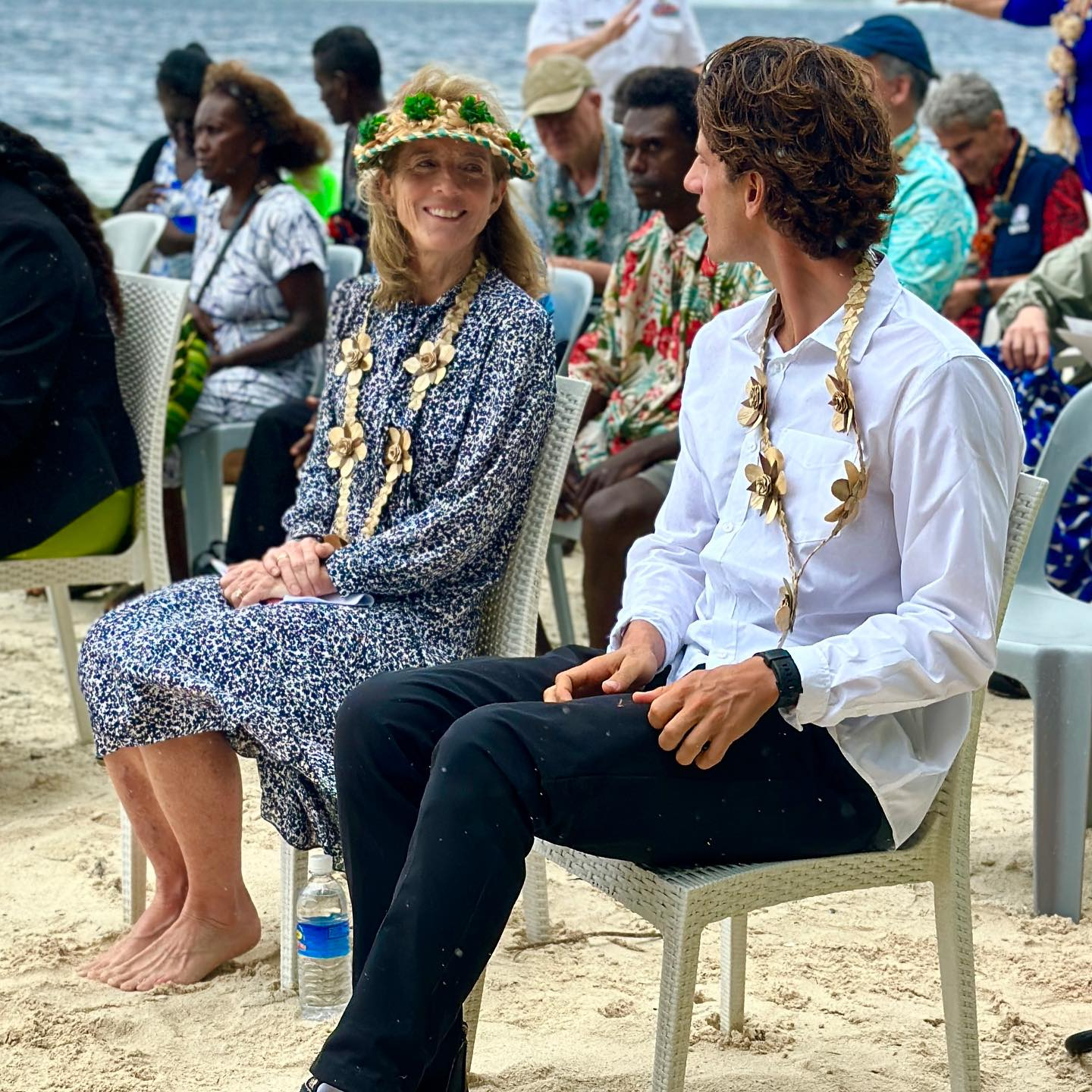
President Kennedy's daughter Caroline Kennedy and her son Jack Schlossberg at Kennedy Island in 2023

== See also ==
- Desert island
- List of islands
