= Gizo, Solomon Islands =

Gizo Ghizo
- Town
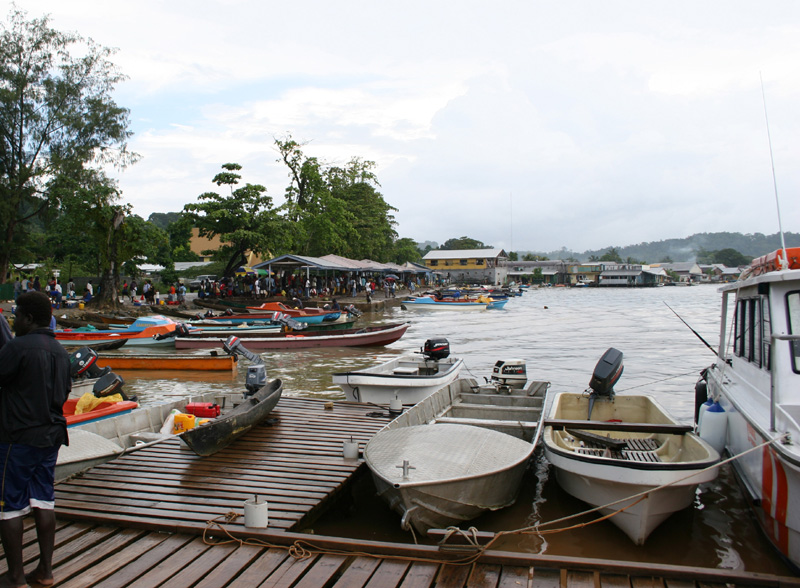
- A view of Waterfront Market place in Gizo

- Location in Solomon Islands
- Coordinates: 8°06′20″S 156°50′20″E
- Country: Solomon Islands
- Province: Western Province
- Island: Ghizo

Population (2019)
  - Total: 4,260

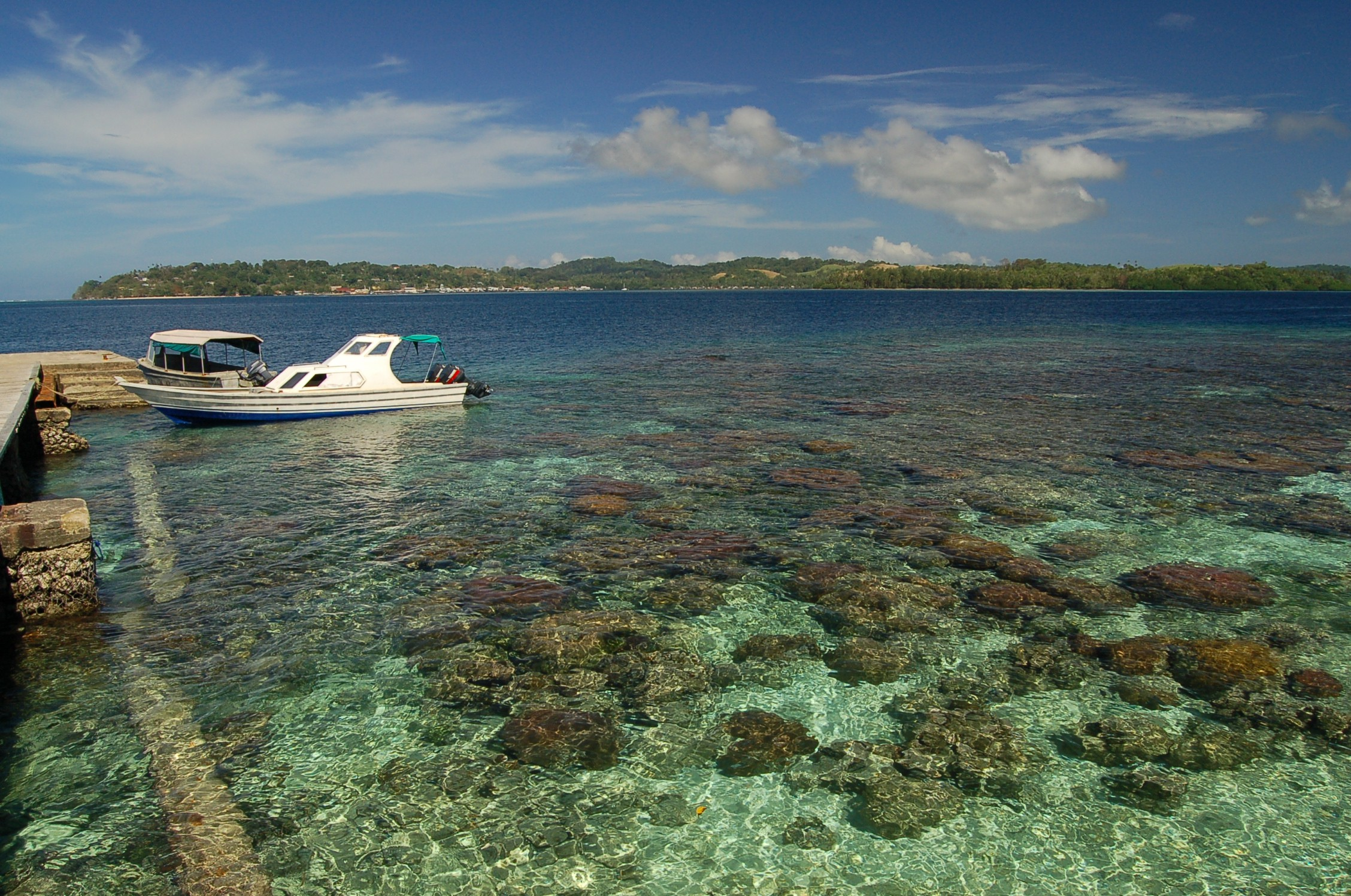
Coral reef in Gizo near the airfield

Gizo is the capital of the Western Province in Solomon Islands. The town had a population of 4,620 as of 2019. It is situated on Ghizo Island approximately 380 kilometres (236 miles) west-northwest of the capital, Honiara, and is just southwest of the larger island of Kolombangara.

Gizo has a small landing strip on the nearby island of Nusatupe to the north east of the town, making it relatively developed compared to other settlements in the general vicinity. These days, Gizo is a tourism centre with diving and surfing being popular activities.

== History ==
This area of Solomon Islands has had a history of headhunting. According to local stories the Gizo tribe were notorious in this activity. As a consequence the surrounding local tribes took the unusual step of joining together to obliterate the Gizo tribe. The stories further relate that the only survivors were a Gizo woman and her son.

This event led to Ghizo island being declared as a property of the state, rather than the usual customary ownership prevalent in much of the rest of the Solomons. As a secondary consequence becoming an administrative and business centre because of the relative ease with which registered land titles could be obtained.

In January 1900, Arthur Mahaffy, the Deputy Commissioner to the Resident Commissioner Charles Morris Woodford, established a government station at Gizo, with orders to suppress headhunting in New Georgia and neighbouring islands.

The Methodist Mission in the Western Province was established by Rev. John Francis Goldie in 1902. He dominated the mission and gained the loyalty of Solomon Islander members of his church. The relationship with the colonial administrators of the British Solomon Island Protectorate were also fraught with difficulty, at this time due to Goldie's effective control over the Western Solomon Islands.

From 1927 to 1934 Dr. Edward Sayers worked at the Methodist mission in the Solomons. He established a hospital at Gizo and also at Munda and Vella Lavella, and carried out fieldwork in the treatment of malaria.

St. Peter's Cathedral, also called Gizo Cathedral, is the cathedral affiliated to the Catholic Church that is located in Gizo. It was inaugurated and blessed by Bishop EJ Crawford on June 18, 1964.

=== World War II ===
In 1942, the islands were occupied by imperial Japanese troops.

Gizo was the operating base for Robert Ballard's The Search for Kennedy's PT 109, which was a National Geographic Channel television special. The son of Eroni Kumana, who was one of the two natives that found the shipwrecked Lt. John F. Kennedy and his surviving men, lives on the island. The three islands, Plum Pudding, Olasana, and Naru, that were visited by the Patrol torpedo boat PT 109 survivors lie just to the southeast of Ghizo island.

=== The 2007 Solomon Islands earthquake ===
On 2 April 2007, Gizo was hit by a tsunami caused by the 8.1 magnitude earthquake centred only 25 miles from the town. Now known as the 2007 Solomon Islands earthquake, the final official death total throughout the Western Province and Choiseul was 52. The tsunami hit during daylight hours, giving people warning to seek higher ground, as the tide withdrew in advance of the wall of water. Ten foot-high waves hit nearby Sasamunga (to the north-east of Gizo on the island of Choiseul), destroying houses, food gardens and a hospital.

=== 2010 earthquakes ===
Magnitude 7.2 and 6.5 quakes hit near the Solomon Islands in the South Pacific less than an hour apart on January 4, 2010. The larger quake was centered 65 miles south-southeast of Gizo, Solomon Islands, and at a depth of 19 miles. The smaller quake was 55 miles south-southeast of Gizo at a depth of 6.2 miles.

=== 2011 tsunami ===
On March 11, 2011, Gizo was put under tsunami warning following a 9.0 magnitude earthquake off Japan's east coast.

== Climate ==
Gizo has a tropical rainforest climate (Af) with heavy to very heavy rainfall year-round.

Climate data for Gizo
Month	Jan	Feb	Mar	Apr	May	Jun	Jul	Aug	Sep	Oct	Nov	Dec	Year
Mean daily maximum °C (°F)	30.9 (87.6)	30.8 (87.4)	30.7 (87.3)	30.4 (86.7)	30.4 (86.7)	29.9 (85.8)	29.2 (84.6)	29.3 (84.7)	29.8 (85.6)	30.5 (86.9)	30.8 (87.4)	31.0 (87.8)	30.3 (86.5)
Daily mean °C (°F)	27.4 (81.3)	27.3 (81.1)	27.2 (81.0)	27.0 (80.6)	27.1 (80.8)	26.7 (80.1)	26.3 (79.3)	26.2 (79.2)	26.6 (79.9)	27.0 (80.6)	27.2 (81.0)	27.4 (81.3)	26.9 (80.5)
Mean daily minimum °C (°F)	23.9 (75.0)	23.8 (74.8)	23.8 (74.8)	23.7 (74.7)	23.8 (74.8)	23.5 (74.3)	23.4 (74.1)	23.2 (73.8)	23.4 (74.1)	23.5 (74.3)	23.7 (74.7)	23.8 (74.8)	23.6 (74.5)
Average precipitation mm (inches)	413 (16.3)	353 (13.9)	385 (15.2)	292 (11.5)	272 (10.7)	258 (10.2)	367 (14.4)	285 (11.2)	267 (10.5)	247 (9.7)	246 (9.7)	284 (11.2)	3,669 (144.5)
Source: Climate-Data.org

== Government ==
Construction on the Correctional Services of Solomon Islands Gizo Correctional Centre in Gizo began in December 2010.
