= Munda, Solomon Islands =

Munda
- Town
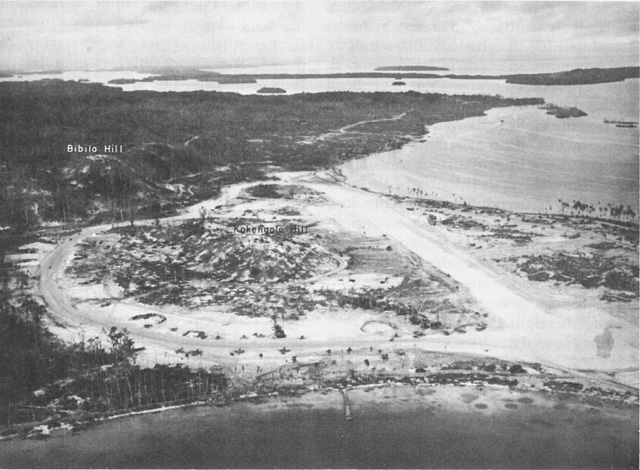
- Munda Point Airfield in New Georgia seen from West - Central Solomons - 1943

- Location in Solomon Islands
- Coordinates: 8°19′37″S 157°16′05″E
- Country: Solomon Islands
- Province: Western
- Island: New Georgia

Population (2019)
  - Total: 1,748

Munda is the largest settlement on the island of New Georgia in the Western Province of Solomon Islands, and consists of a number of villages. It is located at the southwestern tip (called Munda Point) of the western end of New Georgia, and the large Roviana Lagoon is just offshore. The town of Nusa Roviana is 2.6 km (1.62 mi) across the lagoon on Roviana Island.

Munda Point was originally the site of a coconut plantation established by Englishman Norman Wheatley, and then owned by Australian Lesley Gill.

== History ==
The Colonial Office had appointed Charles Morris Woodford as the Resident Commissioner in the Solomon Islands on 17 February 1897. He was directed to control the labour trade operating in the Solomon Island waters and to stop the illegal trade in firearms. Arthur Mahaffy was appointed as the Deputy Commissioner to Woodford in January 1898. In January 1900, Mahaffy established a government station at Gizo, as Woodford considered Mahaffy's military training as making him suitable for the role of suppressing headhunting in New Georgia and neighbouring islands. Mahaffy had a force of twenty-five police armed with rifles. The first target of this force was Chief Ingava of the Roviana Lagoon who had been raiding Choiseul and Isabel and killing or enslaves hundreds of people.

Mahaffy and the police officers under his command carried out a violent and ruthless suppression of headhunting, with his actions having the support of Woodford and the Western Pacific High Commission, who wanted to eradicate headhunting and complete a “pacification” of the western Solomon Islands. Mahaffy seized and destroyed large war canoes (tomokos), which were additionally used to transport the police officers.

The Methodist Mission in the Western Province was established by Rev. John Frances Goldie in 1902. He dominated the mission and gained the loyalty of Solomon Islander members of his church. The relationship with the colonial administrators of the British Solomon Island Protectorate were also fraught with difficulty, at this time due to Goldie's effective control over the Western Solomon Islands. From 1927 to 1934, Dr. Edward Sayers worked at the Methodist mission, where he established a hospital in Munda and also in Gizo and Vella Lavella, and carried out fieldwork for the treatment of malaria.

In November 1942, during World War II, the town became strategically important after Japanese forces built an airstrip (on the site of today's Munda Airport) to support Japanese forces fighting the Battle of Guadalcanal. A Japanese convoy put into Munda Point on 24 November 1942, and started construction under careful concealment from the air by means of rows of coconut palms suspended by cable. The airstrip was discovered by American planes on 3 December, and the first airstrikes were delivered by B-17 Flying Fortress bombers on 9 December. However, the Japanese were able to use Munda despite regular bombardment from both air and sea, and the Allies launched Operation Cartwheel in order to drive the Japanese out of the Solomons and ultimately eliminate the large Japanese base at Rabaul. The New Georgia Campaign was launched in late June, 1943 when mainly American but also Pacific Islander troops conducted the Landings on Rendova and several other amphibious operations throughout the New Georgia Group.

The Allied forces spent July 1943 conducting the Drive on Munda Point, shelling and bombing Japanese forces in and around Munda Airfield, fighting off a large Japanese counterattack, and eventually closing in on Munda overland, capturing it on 4–5 August during the Battle of Munda Point. The heavy fighting left thousands dead on both sides and many more wounded.

== Transport ==
Boats are the main method of coastal and inter-island transport.

The airstrip from World War II was later converted into Munda Airport and is used commercially for daily flights which land from Honiara, Seghe and Gizo, including services on Solomon Airlines. In 2013, a US$20 million New Zealand government aid project modernized and repaired the air strip, which was in disrepair, and removed unexploded ordnances from World War II. In 2017, a further US$6 million New Zealand government aid and development project significantly upgraded the field to an international airport in order to serve as an alternate field for international flights to Honiara International Airport, significantly reducing the fuel load and improving the economics of the flight. This upgrade saw the installation of ground lighting, perimeter security fencing and airport rescue and firefighting services, including two new fire trucks.

== Geography ==
Lambete, the largest village in Munda, consists of a number of shops, a branch of the Bank of South Pacific, a post office, a telecommunications centre, a bakery, accommodations, the airstrip and a small port.

=== Climate ===
Climate data for Munda, Solomon Islands (1991–2020 normals, extremes 1962–1986, 1991–2020)
Month	Jan	Feb	Mar	Apr	May	Jun	Jul	Aug	Sep	Oct	Nov	Dec	Year
Record high °C (°F)	34.4 (93.9)	36.4 (97.5)	35.0 (95.0)	33.9 (93.0)	33.2 (91.8)	34.4 (93.9)	33.3 (91.9)	33.0 (91.4)	32.8 (91.0)	33.8 (92.8)	33.6 (92.5)	34.2 (93.6)	36.4 (97.5)
Mean daily maximum °C (°F)	31.4 (88.5)	31.1 (88.0)	31.1 (88.0)	31.1 (88.0)	30.7 (87.3)	30.2 (86.4)	29.7 (85.5)	29.8 (85.6)	30.3 (86.5)	30.8 (87.4)	31.4 (88.5)	31.7 (89.1)	30.8 (87.4)
Daily mean °C (°F)	27.8 (82.0)	27.6 (81.7)	27.6 (81.7)	27.6 (81.7)	27.4 (81.3)	27.1 (80.8)	26.8 (80.2)	26.8 (80.2)	27.1 (80.8)	27.4 (81.3)	27.7 (81.9)	28.0 (82.4)	27.4 (81.3)
Mean daily minimum °C (°F)	24.4 (75.9)	24.3 (75.7)	24.2 (75.6)	24.2 (75.6)	24.2 (75.6)	24.1 (75.4)	24.0 (75.2)	23.9 (75.0)	24.0 (75.2)	24.1 (75.4)	24.2 (75.6)	24.4 (75.9)	24.2 (75.6)
Record low °C (°F)	20.3 (68.5)	20.3 (68.5)	21.1 (70.0)	21.1 (70.0)	20.6 (69.1)	19.7 (67.5)	20.0 (68.0)	15.6 (60.1)	19.4 (66.9)	18.3 (64.9)	19.8 (67.6)	21.1 (70.0)	15.6 (60.1)
Average precipitation mm (inches)	410 (16.1)	431 (17.0)	352 (13.9)	292 (11.5)	276 (10.9)	291 (11.5)	357 (14.1)	272 (10.7)	244 (9.6)	270 (10.6)	227 (8.9)	266 (10.5)	3,741 (147.3)
Average precipitation days (≥ 1 mm)	18	18	19	18	18	18	20	18	17	16	15	16	210
Source 1: National Oceanic and Atmospheric Administration
Source 2: Deutscher Wetterdienst (humidity 1962–1986)

== See also ==
- Kasi Maru
