= New Georgia =

Largest island in Western Province, Solomon Islands

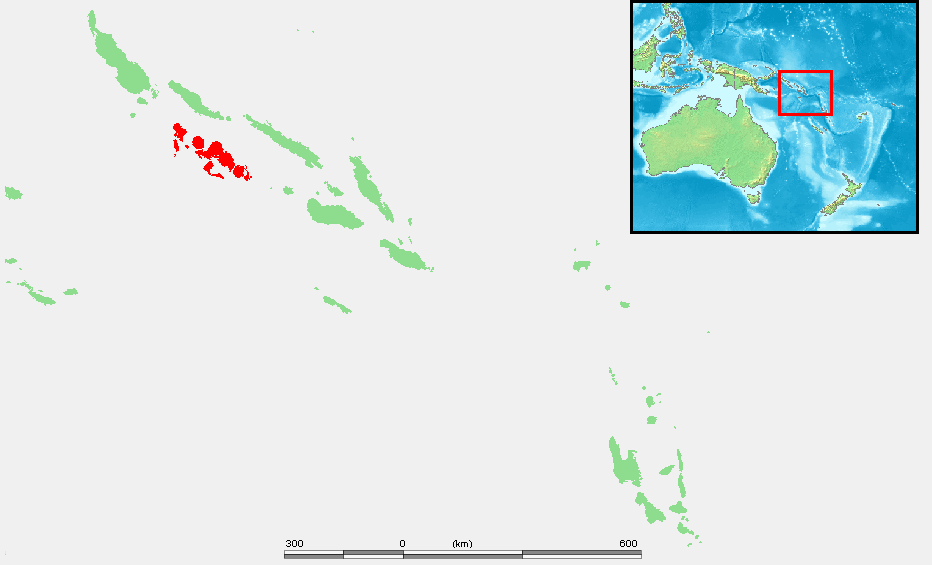
- Location of the New Georgia Islands in Solomon Islands

Geography
- Location: Pacific Ocean
- Coordinates: 8°15′S 157°30′E
- Archipelago: Solomon Islands
- Area: 2,037 km^{2} (786 sq mi)
- Length: 72 km (44.7 mi)
- Highest elevation: 860 m (2820 ft)
- Highest point: Mount Masse

Administration
- Solomon Islands
- province: Western Province

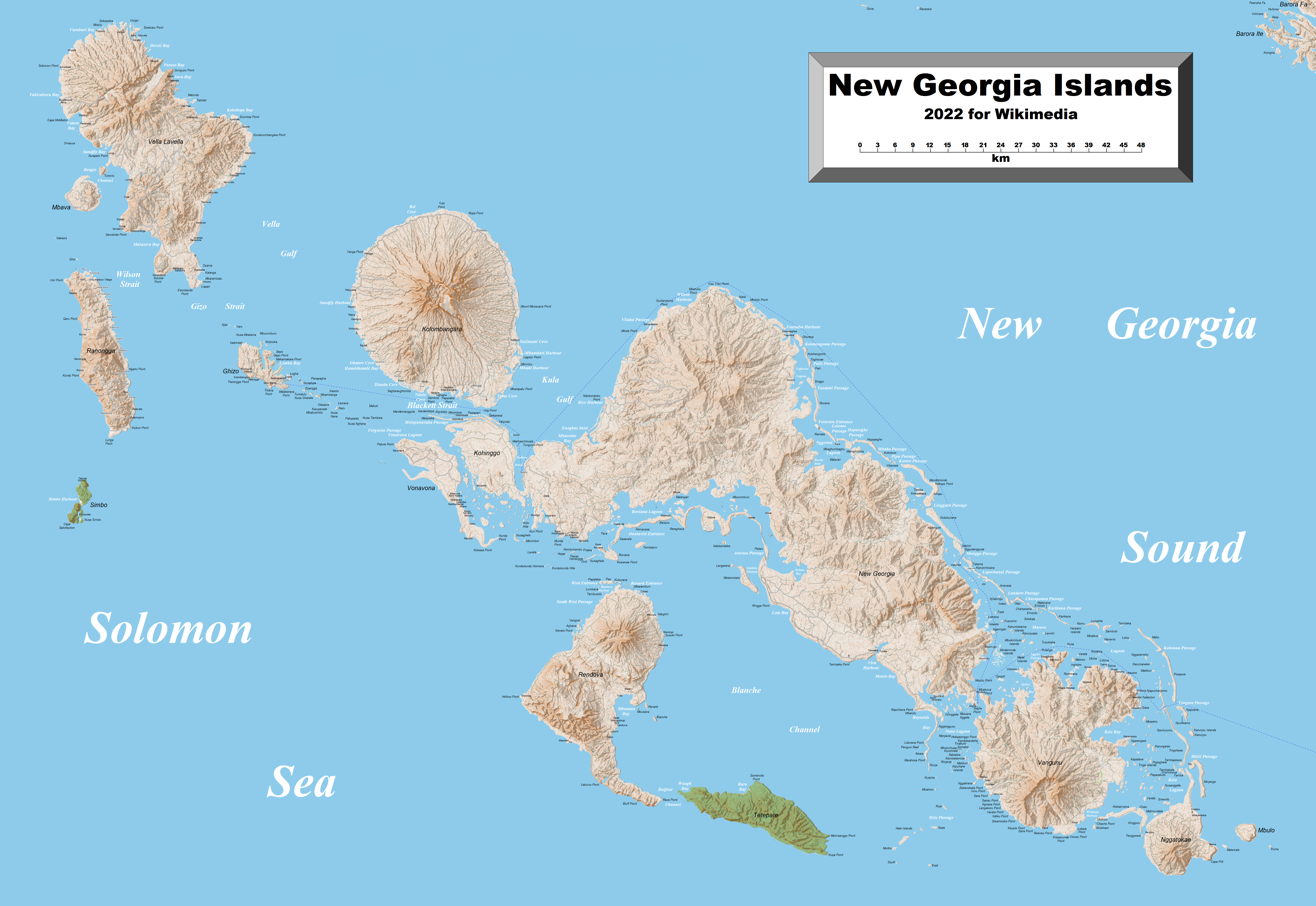
A map of the New Georgia Islands

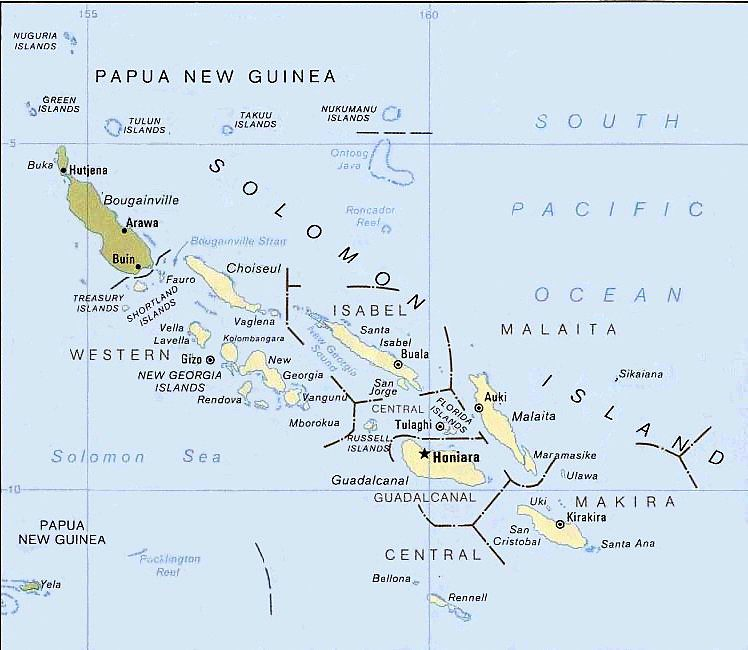
A map of the Solomon Islands, with New Georgia located in the centre-left

New Georgia, with an area of 2,037 km^{2} (786 sq mi), is the largest of the islands in Western Province, Solomon Islands, and the 203rd-largest island in the world. Since July 1978, the island has been part of the independent state of Solomon Islands.

== Geography ==
New Georgia island is located in the New Georgia Group, an archipelago including most of the other larger islands in the province. The island measures approximately 85 kilometres (53 mi) long by 41 kilometres (25 mi) wide. New Georgia forms part of the southern boundary of the New Georgia Sound. Kolombangara lies across the Kula Gulf to the west, Choiseul to the northeast, Vangunu is to the southeast, and Rendova to the southwest, across the Blanche Channel.

New Georgia is a volcanic island, surrounded in some places by a coral reef. The highest point is Mount Masse, with an elevation of 860 metres (2,820 ft).

The climate is wet and tropical, and the island is subject to frequent cyclones. New Georgia is covered with dense vegetation, in the marshy areas mangroves are located.

== Population ==
The population of the island was 19,312 in 1999. Most of the population resides on the south coast; however, the main settlement is the village of Munda, located in the west. On the southeastern coast is the village of Sege. The islanders speak several Melanesian languages. The ten languages spoken on the island are from the family of New Georgia languages, a subgroup of the Northwest Solomonic languages within the Oceanic languages, a major group of the Austronesian family.

The Kalikoqu is a tribe in the Roviana Lagoon on the southern side of New Georgia Island; the larger tribal polities are the chief districts of Saikile and Kalikoqu.

== History ==
The central part of New Georgia is the cradle of Roviana culture. A large complex of megalithic shrines and other structures was developed in the 13th century AD. Later, between the 15th and 17th centuries Roviana people moved over to smaller barrier islands at New Georgia with a hub in Nusa Roviana. Through trade and headhunting expeditions, Nusa Roviana turned into the regional centre of power and trade.

The island was named New Georgia, by John Shortland when his ship, the Alexander, passed by it in August 1789 when returning to England in command of four vessels of the First Fleet.

On March 15, 1893, Captain Herbert Gibson of HMS Curacoa, declared New Georgia to be part of the British Solomon Islands Protectorate.

The Colonial Office appointed Charles Morris Woodford as the Resident Commissioner in the Solomon Islands on 17 February 1897. He was directed to control the labour trade operating in the Solomon Island waters and to stop the illegal trade in firearms. Arthur Mahaffy was appointed as the Deputy Commissioner to Woodford in January 1898. In January 1900, Mahaffy established a government station at Gizo, as Woodford considered Mahaffy’s military training as making him suitable for the role of suppressing headhunting in New Georgia and neighbouring islands. Mahaffy had a force of twenty-five police officers armed with rifles, who were recruited from the islands of Malaita, Savo and Isabel. The first target of this force was chief Ingava of the Roviana Lagoon of New Georgia who had been raiding Choiseul and Isabel and killing or enslaving hundreds of people.

Mahaffy and the police officers under his command carried out a violent and ruthless suppression of headhunting, with his actions having the support of Woodford and the Western Pacific High Commission, who wanted to eradicate headhunting and complete a “pacification” of the western Solomon Islands through punitive expeditions. Mahaffy seized and destroyed large war canoes (tomokos). One of which was used to transport the police officers. The western Solomon Islands were substantially pacified by 1902. During this time Mahaffy acquired artefacts held in high value by the Solomon Islanders for his personal collection.

The Methodist Mission in New Georgia was established by Rev. John Frances Goldie in 1902. He dominated the mission and gained the loyalty of Solomon Islander members of his church. The relationship with the colonial administrators of the British Solomon Island Protectorate were also fraught with difficulty, at this time due to Goldie’s effective control over the Western Solomon Islands.

From 1927 to 1934 Dr Edward Sayers worked at the Methodist mission where he established a hospital at Munda and carried out fieldwork in the treatment of malaria.

=== World War II ===
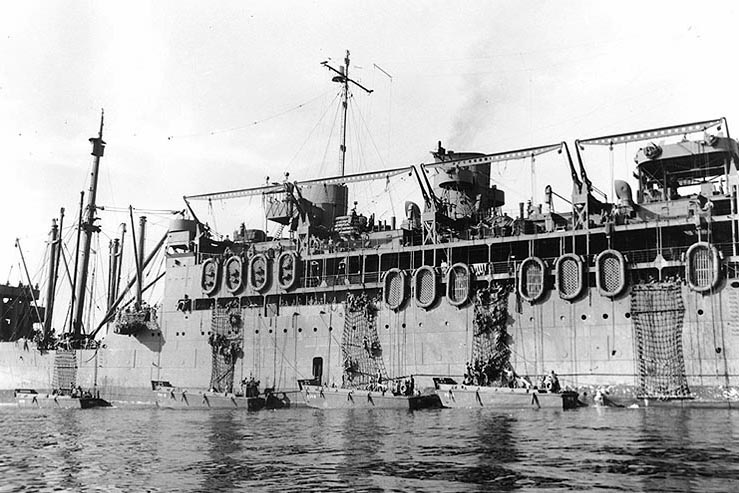
Soldiers climb down netting on the sides of the attack transport USS McCawley on 14 June 1943, rehearsing for landings on New Georgia.

The island was occupied by the Empire of Japan in the early stages of World War II. During Pacific War, the United States' New Georgia Campaign opened with landings on New Georgia and nearby islands on 30 June 1943. New Georgia was secured by American forces on 23 August, after weeks of difficult and bloody jungle fighting, although fighting continued on some nearby islands until October 1943.

Munda, the Japanese base on New Georgia Island, was the main objective of the assault on the island. This base was not overrun until 5 August 1943. The Japanese port at Bairoko Harbor, 13 km (8.1 mi) north of Munda, was not taken until 25 August.

Donald Gilbert Kennedy was a Coastwatcher stationed at Seghe (Segi) on New Georgia during the Solomon Islands campaign during the Pacific War.

== See also ==
- Seghe, Solomon Islands
