= Vella Lavella =

Island in Solomon Islands

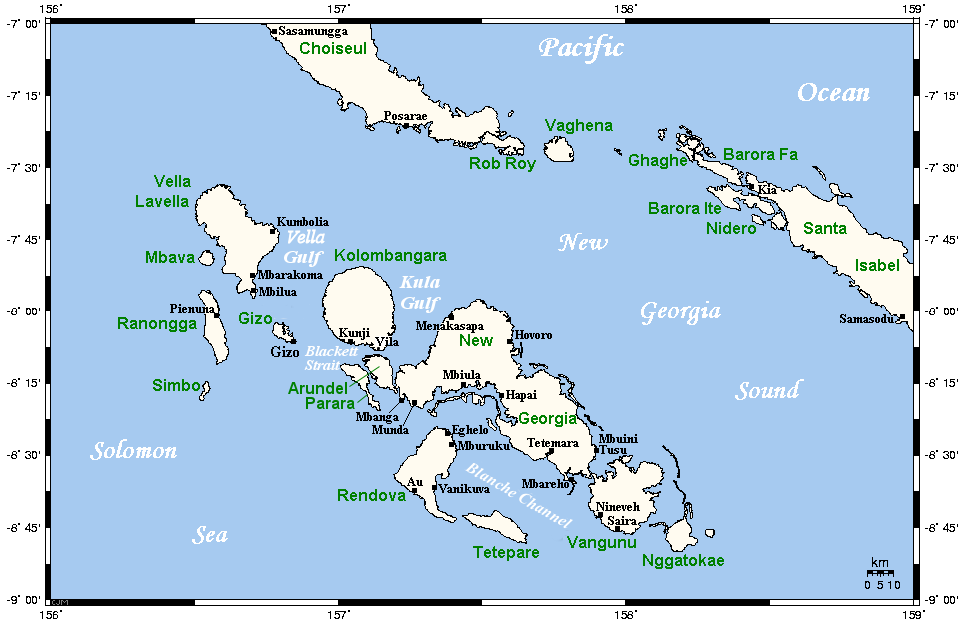
- New Georgia Islands with Vella Lavella at upper left

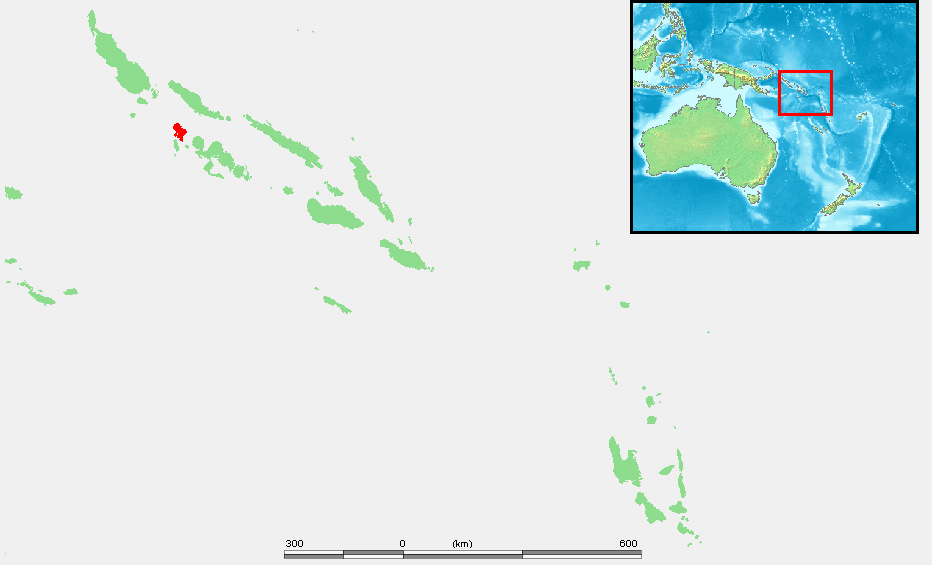

Geography
- Location: Southwestern Pacific Ocean
- Coordinates: 7°44′S 156°38′E
- Archipelago: New Georgia Islands, Solomon Islands (archipelago)
- Area: 628.9 km^{2} (242.8 sq mi)
- Highest elevation: 790 m (2590 ft)
- Highest point: Mount Tambisala

Administration
- Solomon Islands
- Province: Western Province

Demographics
- Population: 9106 (1999)

Vella Lavella is an island in the Western Province of Solomon Islands. It lies to the west of New Georgia, but is considered one of the New Georgia Group. To its west are the Treasury Islands.

== Environment ==
The island of Vella Lavella is located in the southwestern Pacific Ocean. To the north is the island of Choiseul, to the northwest is the island of Shortland, and to the southeast is the island of New Georgia. Vella Lavella is a volcanic island, surrounded in some places by a coral reef. The island contains volcanic cones and one thermal spring. The highest elevation is Mount Tambisala at 790 metres (2,590 ft). The volcano Nonda, the youngest volcano of the island, has an elevation of 750 meters and is considered active, although it has never erupted in modern times. The smaller rivers running from the mountains to the coast allow irrigated horticulture to the inhabitants who live almost exclusively on the coast. Vella Lavella is mainly vegetated with lowland rainforest. The climate is wet and tropical, and the island is prone to earthquakes and cyclones.

=== North-west Vella Lavella Important Bird Area ===
An area of 14,641 ha in the north-west of the island has been identified by BirdLife International as an Important Bird Area (IBA) because it supports populations of white-winged fantails, Kolombangara monarchs and endemic Vella Lavella white-eyes. The main threat facing the site is logging.

== History ==
Painted potshards found during excavations have been dated to an age of 2,000 to 3,000 years.

The Bilua language spoken on the island belongs to the Papuan languages, while the other languages of the Solomon Islands belong to the Austronesian languages. Therefore, archaeologists suspect the immigration of a people who did not come from the Melanesian settlement area.

On March 15, 1893 Vella Lavella was declared part of the British Solomon Islands protectorate.

The island was occupied by the Empire of Japan in the early stages of the Pacific War. The Land Battle of Vella Lavella was fought between Allied and Japanese forces from 15 August to 6 October 1943. After a landing at Barakoma on 15 August, American troops advanced along the coasts, pushing the Japanese north. In September, New Zealand troops took over from the Americans and they continued to advance across the island, hemming in the small Japanese garrison consisting of 250 Japanese personnel, who were a mix of soldiers evacuated from New Georgia and sailors who had been stranded on the island, along the north coast. On 6 October, the Japanese began an evacuation operation to withdraw the remaining troops, during which the Naval Battle of Vella Lavella was fought. Following the capture of the island, the Allies developed it into an important airbase that was used in the reduction of the main Japanese base at Rabaul. Subsequently, Barakoma Airfield on Vella Lavella was the home base for VMF-214, the "Black Sheep", led by Gregory "Pappy" Boyington.

Since 1978, the island has been part of the independent state of the Solomon Islands.

== Notable local people ==
- Milner Tozaka was elected to the National Parliament of the Solomon Islands to represent the North Vella Lavella Constituency on 5 April 2006. He is the current Foreign Minister in the cabinet of Prime Minister Rick Douglas Hou; he has previously served as the Minister for Public Service.

== Notes ==
Footnotes

References

- McGee, William L. (2001). "Occupation of Vella Lavella". The Solomons Campaigns, 1942-1943: From Guadalcanal to Bougainville, Pacific War Turning Point, Volume 2 (Amphibious Operations in the South Pacific in WWII). Napa, CA, USA: BMC Publications. ISBN 978-0-9701678-7-3.
- Morison, Samuel Eliot (1958). "Chapter XIII: Vella Lavella". Breaking the Bismarcks Barrier, vol. 6 of History of United States Naval Operations in World War II. Castle Books. ISBN 0-7858-1307-1.

== Gallery ==
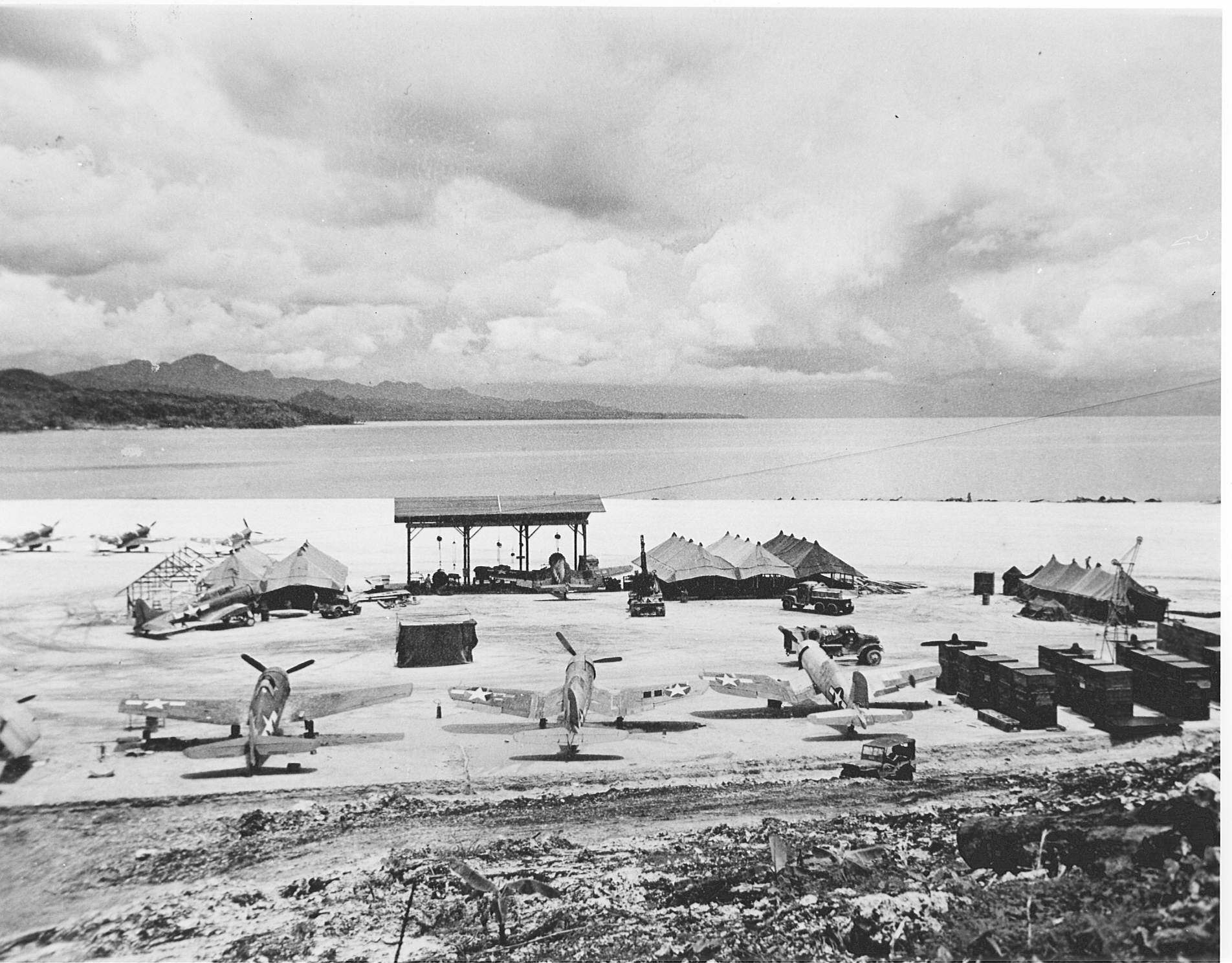
Taken on 10 December 1943, this photo shows Vought F4U-1 Corsair aircraft of VMF-123 and VMF-124, Grumman F6F-3 Hellcats, a Douglas SBD Dauntless, and RNZAF Curtiss Kittyhawk Mk.IV (P-40F) at Barakoma Airfield

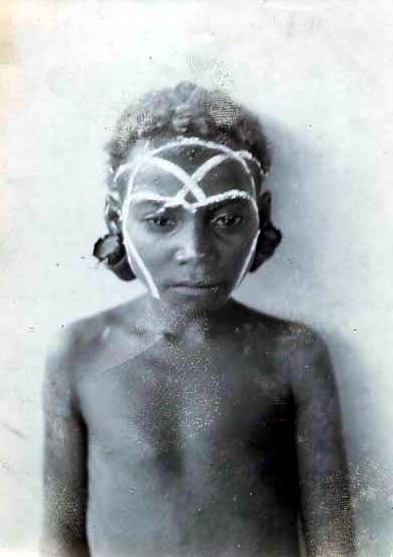
Vella Lavella girl with painted face and shell ear ornaments, c. 1900
