= Western Province (Solomon Islands) =

Western Province Wes Provins (Pijin)
- Province
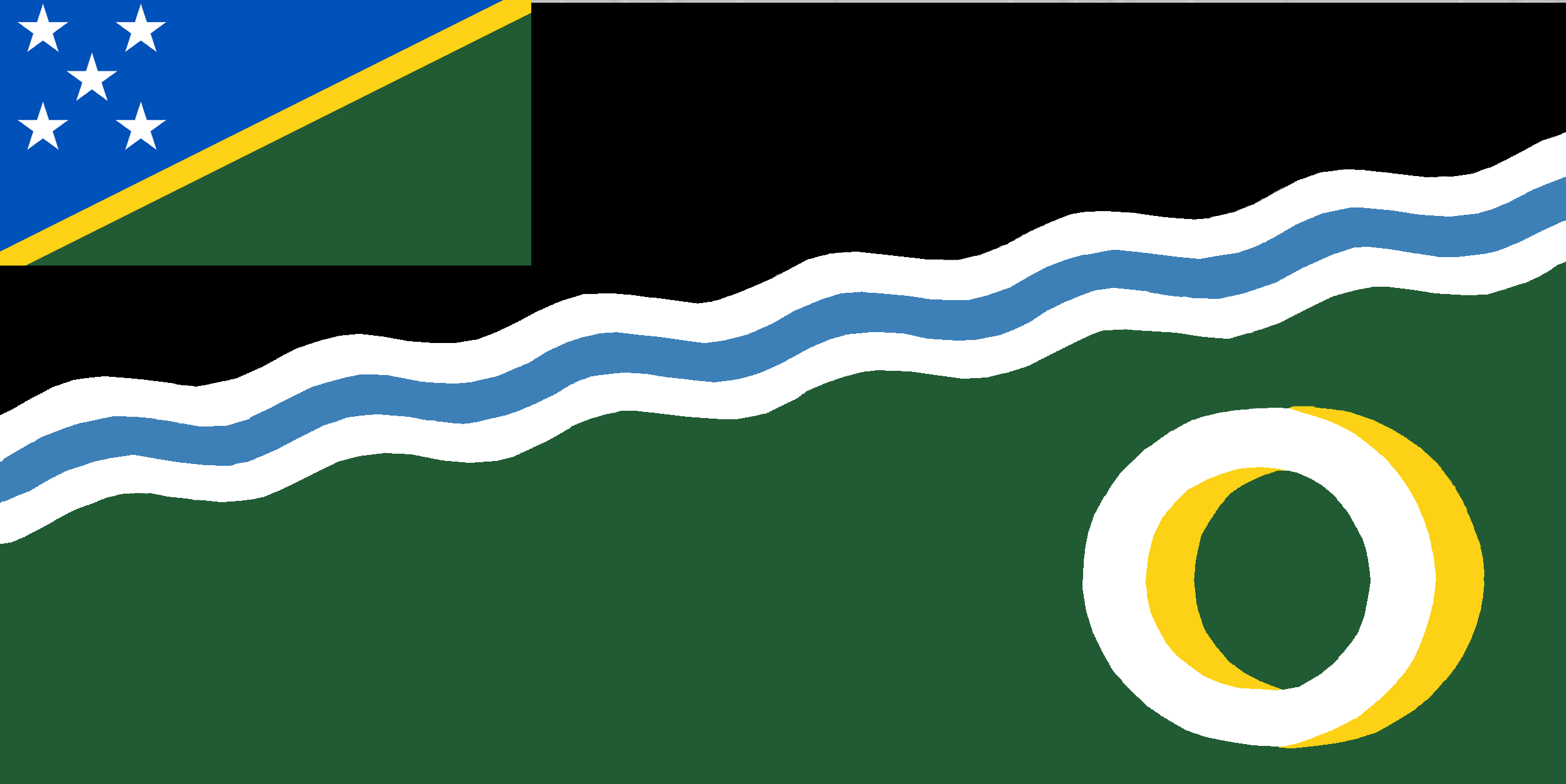
- Flag

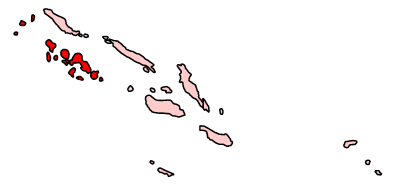
- Coordinates: 8°0′S 157°0′E
- Country: Solomon Islands
- Capital: Gizo

Government
  - Premier: Hon. Billy Veo

Area
  - Total: 7,509 km^{2} (2,899 sq mi)

Population (2019 census)
  - Total: 94,106
  - Density: 12.53/km^{2} (32.46/sq mi)
- Time zone: UTC+11 (+11)
- ISO 3166 code: SB-WE

Western Province is the largest of the nine provinces of Solomon Islands. The area is renowned for its beautiful tropical islands, excellent diving and snorkelling, coral reefs and World War II wrecks, ecotourism lodges, and head-hunting shrines. The province contains many small lagoons and most of the country's tourist trade outside Honiara. The province had a population of 94,106 as of 2019. It had a land area of 7,509 km^{2} (2,899 sq mi).

== History ==
The Methodist Mission in the Western Province was established by Rev. John Francis Goldie in 1902. He dominated the mission and gained the loyalty of Solomon Islander members of his church. The relationship with the colonial administrators of the British Solomon Islands Protectorate were also fraught with difficulty, at this time due to Goldie's effective control over the Western Solomon Islands. From 1927 to 1934 Dr. Edward Sayers worked at the Methodist mission where he established hospitals at Gizo, Munda and Vella Lavella, and carried out fieldwork in the treatment of malaria. It is also well known as the place where a United States Navy torpedo boat commanded by John F. Kennedy was rammed and sunk by a Japanese destroyer during World War II.

== Tourism ==
The provincial capital is Gizo, with a population of 4,260 as of 2019. There are airports at Gizo, Munda, Seghe, Viru, Ramata, Gatokae, Ringgi Cove, Barakoma and Balalai.

The Western Province is considered the tourism mecca of the Solomon Islands, and is by far the most accommodating area, with multiple hotels and resorts, dive shops, ecotourism attractions restaurants, and boat tours.

Munda, the largest town on New Georgia island, has a landing strip built during World War II by the US and is listed as an emergency landing runway, capable of handling even jumbo jets.

The diving in the Western Province is pristine as tourists tend to visit nearby Fiji for diving rather than visiting the less developed Solomon Islands. Malaria is also a concern in the Solomons, which keeps many tourists away. The result is spectacular dive conditions with untouched coral reefs. Munda, Uepi, and Gizo are considered some of the Western Province's best dive locations. The region supports some of the highest coral and fish diversity in the world.

The Western Province and nearby Choiseul Province were significantly affected by 2007 Solomon Islands earthquake, an 8.1 magnitude earthquake that struck on April 2, 2007 and an associated tsunami. It caused 100+ significant (in excess of magnitude 4.0) aftershocks. The official death toll was 52 with several thousand persons displaced, most of the displaced are expected to be living in temporary shelters for a minimum of between six and nine months. The island of Ranongga to the west of Gizo was uplifted by around 2.5 – 3 metres resulting in the death of its fringing reef and also opening massive fissures in the island itself. Reefs around Munda and Uepi were largely unaffected by the tsunami and earthquake.

== Government ==
Billy Veo, MPA for Noro Ward, was elected Premier in January 2023 following the results of the December 2022 provincial election. In early 2026, Veo faced multiple motions of no confidence due to opposition conerns regarding leadership and financial management of the province.

== Administrative divisions ==
Western Province is sub-divided into the following constituencies (or electoral districts), which are further sub-divided into wards (with populations at the 2009 and 2019 Censuses respectively):

Name		Population (2009 census)			Population (2019 census)		
Name		Total	Male	Female	Total	Male	Female
04. – Shortlands		3,703	1,881	1,822	4,467	2,348	2,119
04.01.	Outer Shortlands	1,306	648	658	1,444	755	689
04.02.	Inner Shortlands	2,397	1,233	1,164	3,023	1,593	1,430
05. – North Vella la Vella		4,800	2,461	2,339	5,357	2,780	2,577
05.09.	Ndovele	1,967	1,000	967	2,057	1,042	1,015
05.10.	Irringgilla	2,833	1,461	1,372	3,300	1,738	1,562
06. – South Vella la Vella		7,848	4,082	3,766	8,426	4,273	4,153
06.07.	Vonunu	3,558	1,837	1,721	3,924	1,998	1,926
06.08.	Mbilua	4,290	2,245	2,045	4,502	2,275	2,227
07. – Ranongga/Simbo		8,142	4,153	3,989	8,524	4,354	4,170
07.03.	Simbo	1,782	939	843	1,782	911	871
07.04.	North Ranongga	541	266	275	552	272	280
07.05.	Central Ranongga	2,514	1,227	1,287	2,832	1,446	1,386
07.06.	South Ranongga	3,305	1,721	1,584	3,358	1,725	1,633
08. – Gizo/Kolombangara		13,478	7,270	6,208	17,311	9,166	8,145
08.11.	Gizo	7,177	3,802	3,375	9,455	,4883	4,572
08.12.	South/East Kolombangara	4,023	2,215	1,808	4,934	2,693	2,241
08.26.	North/West Kolombangara	2,278	1,253	1,025	2,922	1,590	1,332
09. – West New Georgia/Vonavona		13,495	7,025	6,470	19,683	9,997	9,686
09.13.	Vonavona	5,515	2,883	2,632	6,398	3,296	3,102
09.15.	Munda	2,620	1,352	1,268	3,797	1,914	1,883
09.16.	Nusa Roviana	1,995	1,018	977	2,284	1,141	1,143
09.25.	Noro	3,365	1,772	1,593	7,204	3,646	3,558
10. – North New Georgia		4,021	2,086	1,935	6,073	3,238	2,835
10.14.	Kusaghe	2,238	1,157	1,081	2,508	1,273	1,235
10.20.	Kolombaghea	1,783	929	854	3,565	1,965	1,600
11. – South New Georgia, Rendova & Tetepari		8,876	4,600	4,276	9,756	5,145	4,611
11.17.	Roviana Lagoon	4,675	2,441	2,234	5,206	2,793	2,413
11.18.	South Rendova	2,477	1,280	1,197	2,643	1,355	1,288
11.19.	North Rendova	1,724	879	845	1,907	997	910
12. – Marovo		12,286	6,368	5,918	14,509	7,632	6,877
12.21.	Mbuini Tusu	2,965	1,596	1,369	3,799	2,053	1,746
12.22.	Nono	3,610	1,899	1,711	4,065	2,094	1,971
12.23.	Nggatokae	3,050	1,553	1,497	3,434	1,810	1,624
12.24.	North Vangunu	2,661	1,320	1,341	3,211	1,675	1,536
Total		76,649	39,926	37,047	94,106	48,933	45,173

== Islands ==
- Akara Island
- Faisi
- Fauro Island
- Gizo
- Ghoi
- Kennedy Island
- Kiambe
- Kingguru
- Kohinggo
- Kolombangara
- Liapari
- Logha
- Lola Island
- Marovo Island
- Marovo Lagoon
- Matikuri
- Mbava
- Mborokua
- Mbulo Island
- Mondomondo
- Mono Island
- Nakaza
- New Georgia
- Nggatokae
- Nusatupe
- Ranongga
- Rendova
- Shortland Island
- Simbo
- Stirling Island
- Telina
- Tetepare
- Uepi
- Vella Lavella
- Vangunu
- Vonavona
