= New Georgia Islands =

Island group in Solomon Islands

Coordinates: 8°30′S 157°20′E

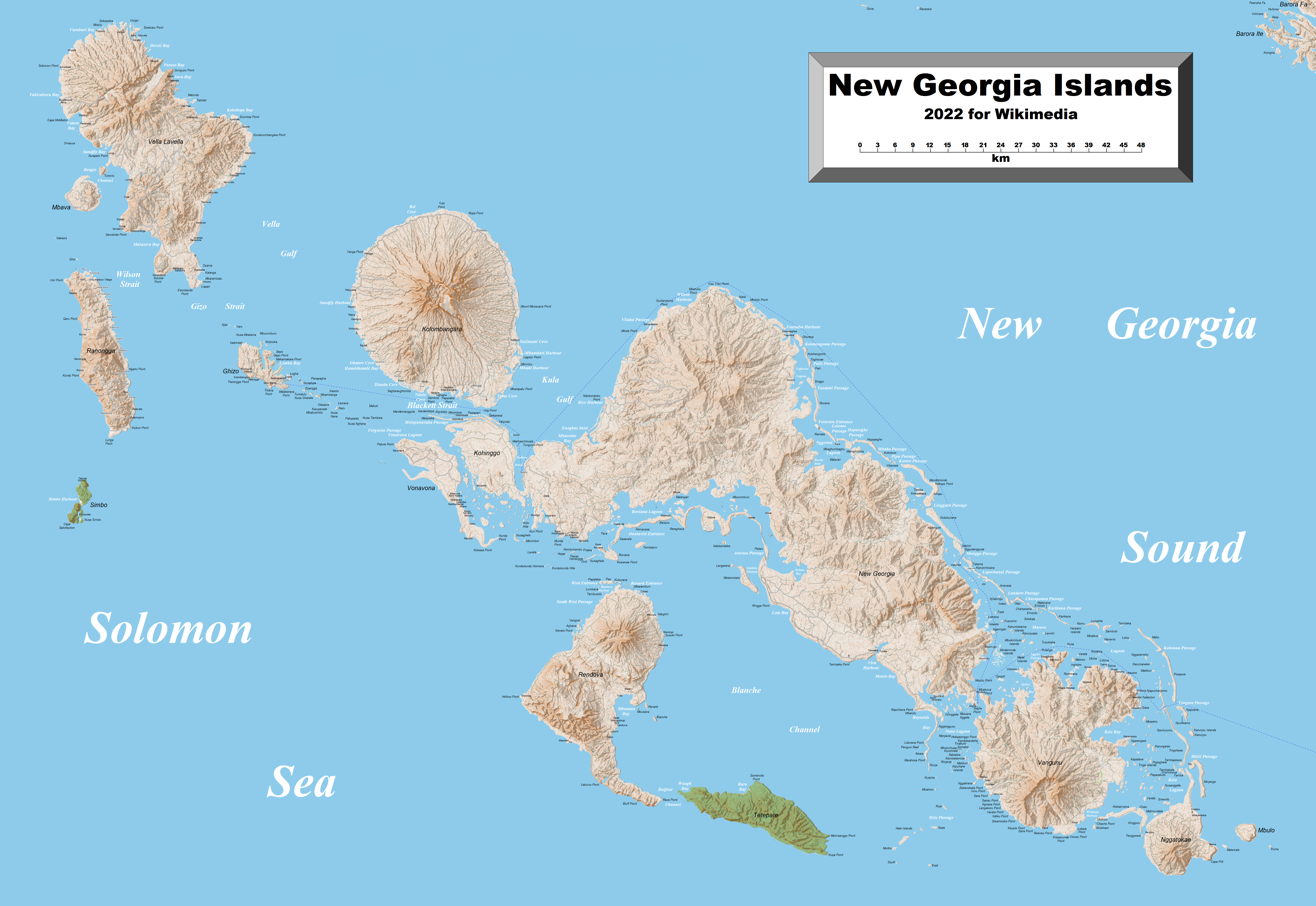
New Georgia Islands

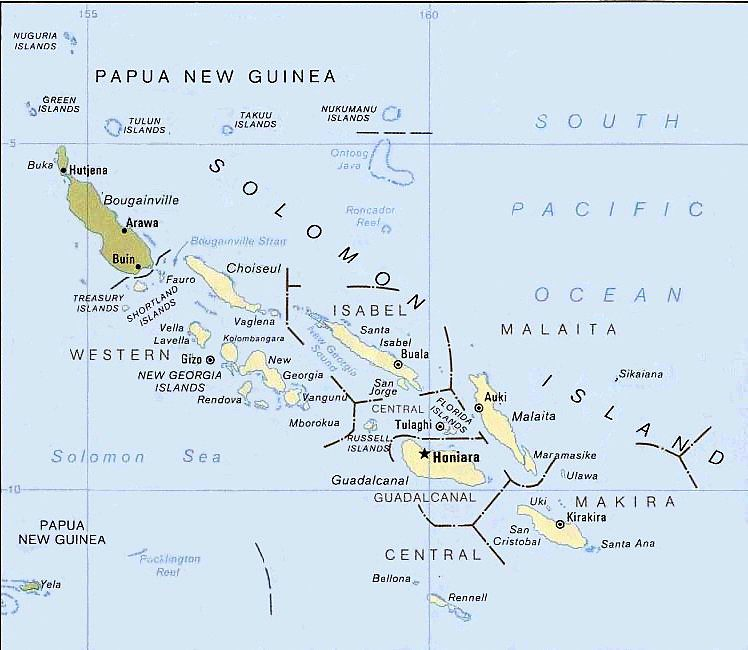
A map of the Solomon Islands, with the New Georgia Islands located in the centre-left

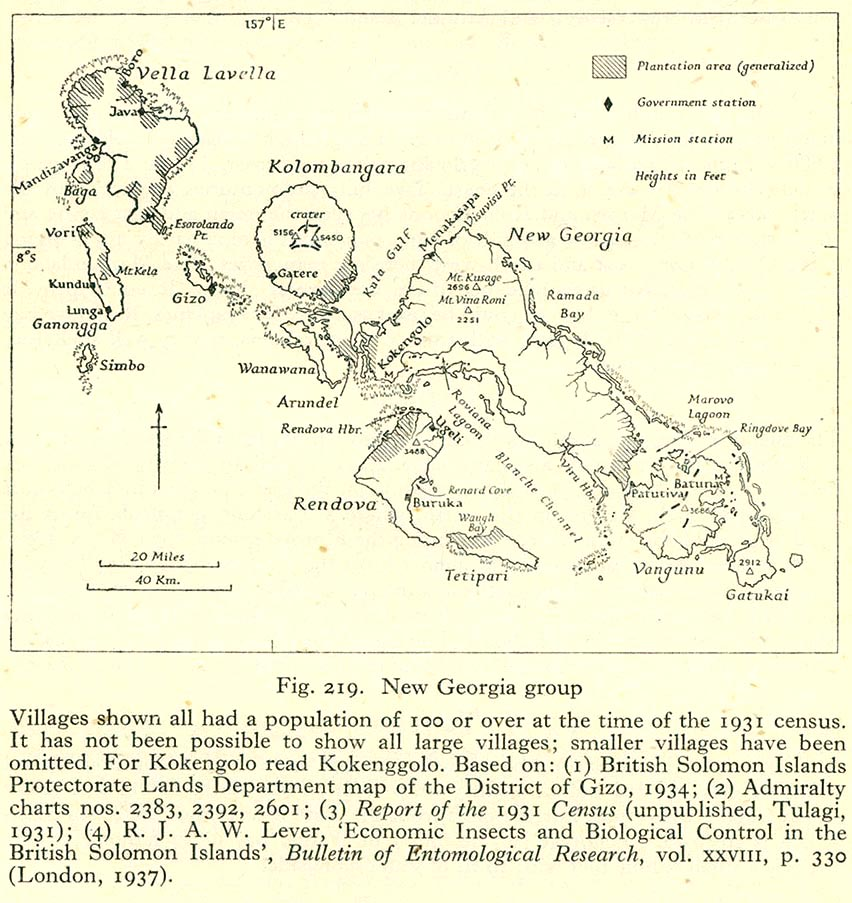
Map of the New Georgia Islands (1943–1945)

The New Georgia Islands are part of the Western Province of Solomon Islands. They are located to the northwest of Guadalcanal. The larger islands are mountainous and covered in rain forest. The main islands are New Georgia, Vella Lavella, Kolombangara (a dormant volcano), Ghizo, Vangunu, Rendova and Tetepare. They are surrounded by coral reefs and include the Marovo Lagoon.

Another famous location is Kennedy Island where the future United States president, John F. Kennedy, spent three days stranded during World War II. Several of the islands were scenes of fighting in the war.

The main towns are Gizo, Munda and Noro. The main industries are forestry and fishing.

One of the smaller New Georgia islands, Ranongga, was lifted three metres (10 ft.) out of the Pacific Ocean by the 2007 Solomon Islands earthquake, causing an expansion of its shoreline by up to 70 metres all around.

Northwest Solomonic languages are spoken on the island, as well as the non-Austronesian language Touo in the southern part of Rendova Island.

== See also ==
- Western Province topics
