= List of islands of Solomon Islands =

Overview of the islands of Solomon Islands

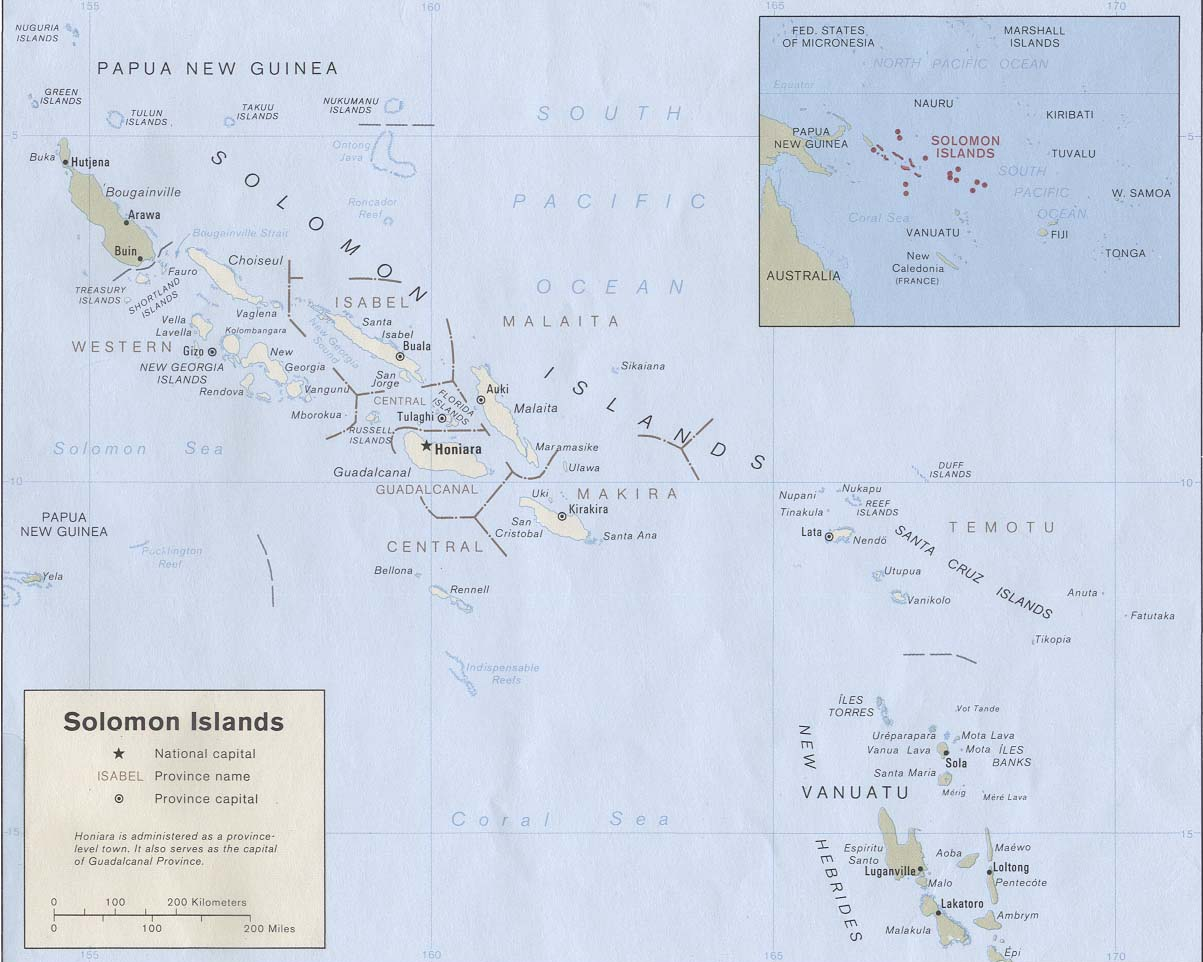
Islands and provinces of Solomon Islands in 1989 (click to enlarge).

This is a list of islands of Solomon Islands, by province and archipelago.

== Islands ==
- Choiseul Province
  - Choiseul Island
  - Taro Island
  - Vaghena Island (Vaglena, Wagina)
- Western Province
  - Shortland Islands
    - Magusaiai
    - Alu Island (Shortland)
    - Pirumeri
    - Fauro Island
    - Masamasa
    - Ovau
  - Treasury Islands
    - Mono Island
    - Stirling Island
  - New Georgia Group
    - Vella Lavella
    - Mbava
    - Ranongga (Ghanongga)
    - Simbo
    - Ghizo Island
    - Kolombangara (Kilimbangara)
    - Vonavona
    - Kohinggo
    - New Georgia
    - Tetepare
    - Akara
    - Rendova
    - Vangunu
    - Penjuku
    - Nggatokae
    - Mborokua
- Isabel Province
  - Santa Isabel
  - San Jorge
- Central Province
  - Russell Islands
  - Nggela Islands (Florida Islands)
    - Nggela Sule (Florida Island)
    - Tulagi (Tulaghi)
    - Gavutu
    - Tanambogo
  - Savo Island
- Guadalcanal Province
  - Guadalcanal
- Malaita Province
  - Malaita
  - Maramasike (South Malaita, Small Malaita)
  - Mbasakana
  - Stewart Islands
    - Mutuavi
    - Faore
    - Tehaolei
    - Sikaiana
  - Ontong Java Atoll (Ongtong Java, Lord Howe Atoll)
  - Roncador Reef
- Makira-Ulawa Province
  - Makira (San Cristobal)
  - Olu Malau Islands (Three Sisters Islands)
    - Malaulalo
    - Malaupaina
    - Ali'ite
  - Ulawa
  - Uki Ni Masi
  - Owaraha (Santa Ana)
  - Owariki (Santa Catalina)
- Rennell and Bellona Province
  - Rennell
  - Bellona
  - Indispensable Reefs
    - North Reef
    - Middle Reef
      - Nottingham Islet
    - South Reef
- Temotu Province
  - Santa Cruz Islands
    - Nendo (Ndeni, Nitendi, Ndende, Santa Cruz)
      - Temotu Neo (Malo)
      - Temotu Noi
    - Utupua
    - Vanikoro
      - Banie
      - Teanu (Tevai)
    - Tinakula
  - Reef Islands
  - Duff Islands (Pileni Taumako)
    - Taumako
      - Taumako
      - Tahua
      - Tohua
    - Bass Islands
      - Lua
      - Kaa
      - Loreva
    - Treasurer's Islands
      - Tuleki
      - Te Aku
      - Lakao
      - Ulaka
    - Hallie Jackson Reef
  - Tikopia
  - Anuta (Anua)
  - Fatutaka

== See also ==
- Geography of Solomon Islands
