= USS Columbia (CL-56) =

Light cruiser of the United States Navy

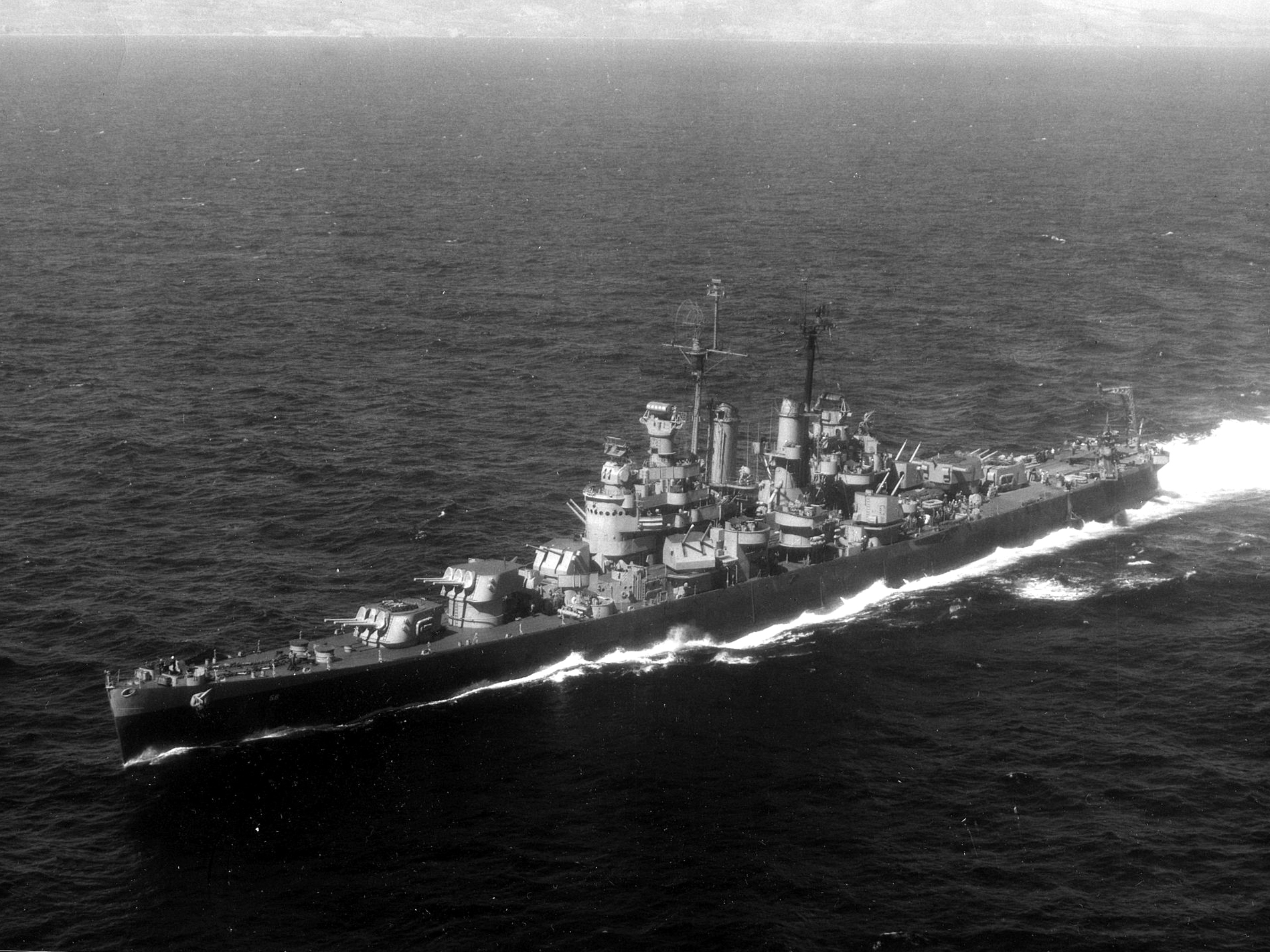
- USS Columbia (CL-56), 15 May 1945

History

United States
- Name: Columbia
- Namesake: City of Columbia, South Carolina
- Builder: New York Shipbuilding Corporation
- Laid down: 18 August 1940
- Launched: 17 December 1941
- Commissioned: 29 July 1942
- Decommissioned: 30 November 1946
- Stricken: 1 March 1959
- Honors and awards: 2 × Presidential Unit Citation
- Fate: Sold for scrap, 18 February 1959

General characteristics
- Class & type: Cleveland-class light cruiser
- Displacement: Standard: 11,744 long tons (11,932 t); Full load: 14,131 long tons (14,358 t)
- Length: 610 ft 1 in (185.95 m)
- Beam: 66 ft 4 in (20.22 m)
- Draft: 24 ft 6 in (7.47 m)
- Installed power: 4 × Babcock & Wilcox boilers; 100,000 shp (75,000 kW)
- Propulsion: 4 × steam turbines; 4 × screw propellers
- Speed: 32.5 knots (60.2 km/h; 37.4 mph)
- Range: 11,000 nmi (20,000 km; 13,000 mi) at 15 kn (28 km/h; 17 mph)
- Complement: 1,285 officers and enlisted
- Armament: 12 × 6 in (152 mm) Mark 16 guns; 12 × 5 in (127 mm)/38 caliber guns; 8 × 40 mm (1.6 in) Bofors anti-aircraft guns; 13 × 20 mm (0.79 in) Oerlikon anti-aircraft guns
- Armor: Belt: 3.5–5 in (89–127 mm); Deck: 2 in (51 mm); Barbettes: 6 in (152 mm); Turrets: 6 in (152 mm); Conning Tower: 5 in (127 mm)
- Aircraft carried: 4 × floatplanes
- Aviation facilities: 2 × stern catapults

USS Columbia (hull number: CL-56) was a Cleveland-class light cruiser of the United States Navy, which were built during World War II. The class was designed as a development of the earlier Brooklyn-class cruisers, the size of which had been limited by the First London Naval Treaty. The start of the war led to the dissolution of the treaty system, but the dramatic need for new vessels precluded a new design, so the Clevelands used the same hull as their predecessors, but were significantly heavier. The Clevelands carried a main battery of twelve 6-inch (152 mm) guns in four three-gun turrets, along with a secondary armament of twelve 5 in (127 mm) dual-purpose guns. They had a top speed of 32.5 knots (60.2 km/h; 37.4 mph).

The ship, the sixth US Navy ship to bear the name, was named for the city of Columbia, South Carolina. Columbia was commissioned in July 1942, and saw service in several campaigns in the Pacific. Like almost all her sister ships, she was decommissioned shortly after the end of the war, and never saw active service again. Columbia was scrapped in the early 1960s. A memorial to the ship and crew who served on her exists in Columbia.

== Design ==
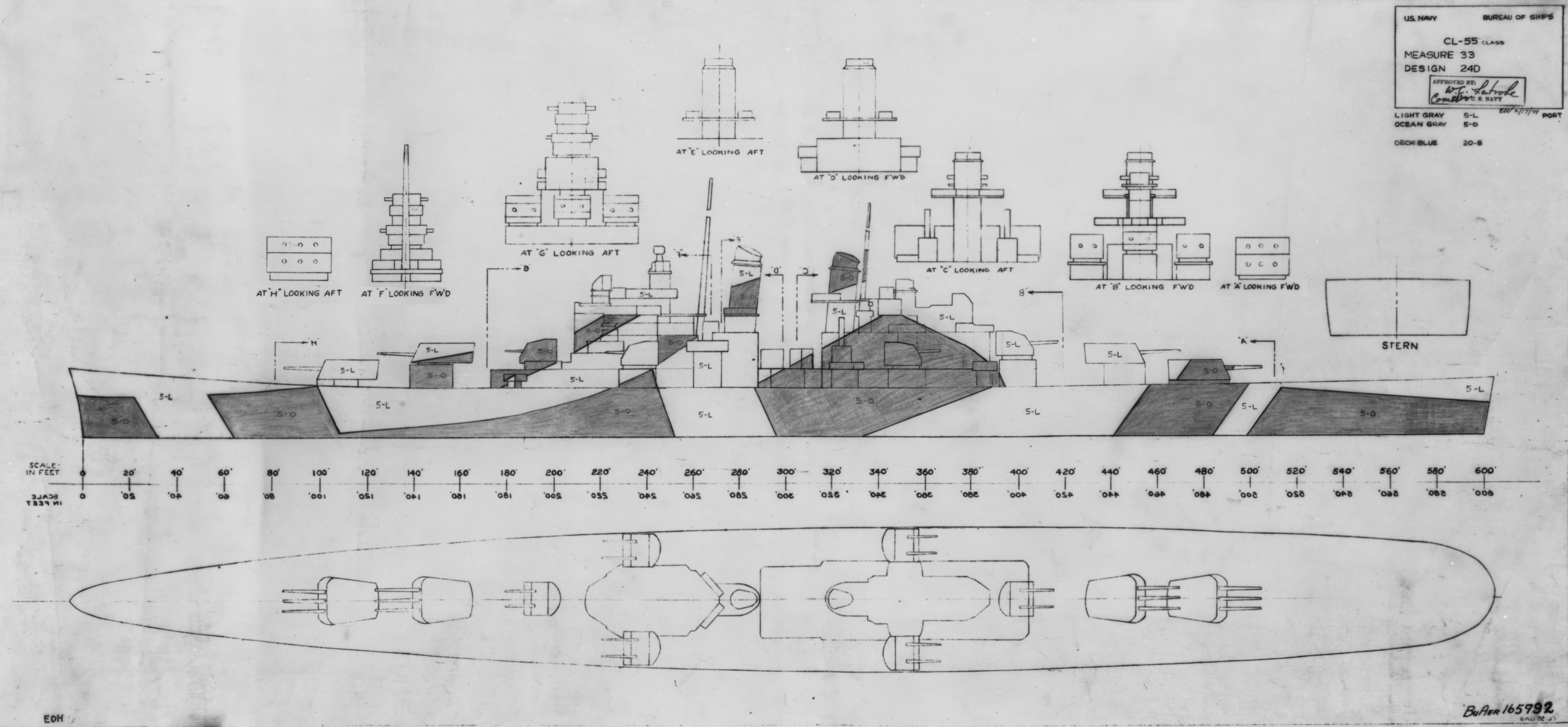
Depiction of the Cleveland class, showing the plan and profile

The Cleveland-class light cruisers traced their origin to design work done in the late 1930s; at the time, light cruiser displacement was limited to 8,000 long tons (8,100 t) by the Second London Naval Treaty. Following the start of World War II in September 1939, Britain announced it would suspend the treaty for the duration of the conflict, a decision the US Navy quickly followed. Though still neutral, the United States recognized that war was likely and the urgent need for additional ships ruled out an entirely new design, so the Clevelands were a close development of the earlier Brooklyn-class cruisers, the chief difference being the substitution of a two-gun 5 in (127 mm) dual-purpose gun mount for one of the main battery 6 in (152 mm) gun turrets.

Columbia was 610 feet 1 inch (186 m) long overall and had a beam of 66 ft 4 in (20.22 m) and a draft of 24 ft 6 in (7.47 m). Her standard displacement amounted to 11,744 long tons (11,932 t) and increased to 14,131 long tons (14,358 t) at full load. The ship was powered by four General Electric steam turbines, each driving one propeller shaft, using steam provided by four oil-fired Babcock & Wilcox boilers. Rated at 100,000 shaft horsepower (75,000 kW), the turbines were intended to give a top speed of 32.5 knots (60.2 km/h; 37.4 mph). Her crew numbered 1285 officers and enlisted men.

The ship was armed with a main battery of twelve 6 in /47-caliber Mark 16 guns (Note: /47 refers to the length of the gun in terms of calibers. A /47 gun is 47 times long as it is in bore diameter.) in four 3-gun turrets on the centerline. Two were placed forward in a superfiring pair; the other two turrets were placed aft of the superstructure in another superfiring pair. The secondary battery consisted of twelve 5 in (127 mm) /38-caliber dual-purpose guns mounted in twin turrets. Two of these were placed on the centerline, one directly behind the forward main turrets and the other just forward of the aft turrets. Two more were placed abreast of the conning tower and the other pair on either side of the aft superstructure. Anti-aircraft defense consisted of eight Bofors 40 mm (1.6 in) guns in two quadruple mounts and thirteen Oerlikon 20 mm (0.79 in) guns in single mounts.

The ship's belt armor ranged in thickness from 3.5 to 5 in (89 to 127 mm), with the thicker section amidships where it protected the ammunition magazines and propulsion machinery spaces. Her deck armor was 2 in (51 mm) thick. The main battery turrets were protected with 6.5 in (170 mm) faces and 3 in (76 mm) sides and tops, and they were supported by barbettes 6 inches thick. Columbia's conning tower had 5-inch sides.

== Service history ==
The keel for Columbia was laid down on 19 August 1940 at the New York Shipbuilding Corporation. She was launched on 17 December 1941, ten days after the Japanese attack on Pearl Harbor brought the United States into World War II. Columbia was moved to the Philadelphia Navy Yard before she was commissioned into the fleet on 29 June 1942. After completing fitting-out work, the ship got underway for initial training on 14 September, which was carried out off Hampton Roads, Virginia, and included weapons familiarization practice and aircraft operations. Columbia then sailed for the Norfolk Navy Yard for repairs and alterations and then embarked on her shakedown cruise in Chesapeake Bay, which lasted from 16 October to 8 November The next day, she got underway and joined Task Group (TG) 2.6, which also included the fast battleship Indiana and the destroyers De Haven, Champlin, and Saufley. The ships sailed south and arrived in Panama on 13 November.

Columbia and the rest of the ships, less Champlin, continued on through the Panama Canal on 13 November and sailed on to Tongatabu. The ships conducted training exercises while on the way. The ships arrived there on 28 November, and TG 2.6 was disbanded the same day. After refueling on 29 November, Columbia was attached to TG 66.6 the following day, along with Indiana, Saufley, and De Haven. The task group departed the next day for Nouméa, arriving there on 2 December. The task group was disbanded and Columbia pulled alongside the repair ship Prometheus, as she had developed turbine problems on the voyage there. Prometheus made temporary repairs that allowed the turbine to operate at low pressure, and Columbia could still make 30 knots (56 km/h; 35 mph). She was then assigned Task Force (TF) 64, which included the fast battleships Washington and Indiana, and the destroyers Balch, Cummings, Nicholas, Woodworth, and Dunlap. The ships departed on 7 December, intending to rendezvous with a task group centered on the fast battleship North Carolina the next day.

=== Operations in the Solomon Islands ===
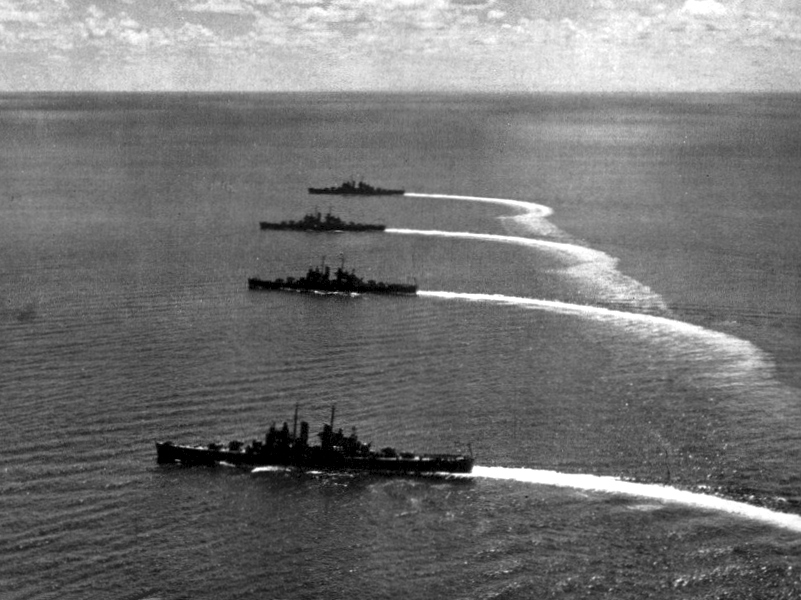
Columbia (2nd from front) and other cruisers off Efate in 1943

The two squadrons met at sea on 9 November and the ships were reorganized; Columbia became part of TG 67.2, which departed for Espiritu Santo in the New Hebrides later that afternoon. The ships arrived there a day later, and from 17 to 22 December, the ships were primarily occupied with combat training, including night fighting drills, anti-aircraft shooting practice, and combined squadron maneuvers. Further maintenance was carried out from 23 to 31 December at Espiritu Santo. Task Force 67 sortied on 2 January 1943 to join the fighting in the Guadalcanal campaign in the Solomon Islands. While the ships were en route, one of Columbia's floatplanes fell off its catapult; a man who was in the plane at the time was picked up by one of the escorting destroyers. The task force arrived off Guadalcanal on 4 January and three of the cruisers split off to carry out a bombardment mission while Columbia and the rest of the force remained off Guadalcanal to screen a group of transports carrying reinforcements for the island. The next morning, the task force came under air attack from three Aichi D3A dive bombers that damaged the New Zealand cruiser HMNZS Achilles, but Columbia was not attacked directly.

The task force arrived back in Espiritu Santo on 8 January, and Columbia received a new seaplane to replace the one that had fallen overboard. She launched both of her aircraft on 12 January for training flights, but one of them crashed at sea; searches for the missing pilot eventually found him on 13 January. That day, the ship was transferred to TF 18, which included the escort carriers Sangamon, Santee, and Chenango, the heavy cruisers Wichita and Chicago, the light cruisers Cleveland and Montpelier, and eight destroyers. The light cruisers formed Cruiser Division 12. Columbia later received yet another replacement seaplane. TF 18 was moved from Espiritu Santo to Efate.

==== Battle of Rennell Island ====
The task force sortied on 27 January, bound for the Solomons; two days later, the ships' air search radars picked up a group of unidentified aircraft approaching the formation. The escort carriers had already been detached to fly ground support missions, so the cruisers and destroyers were caught without air cover. In the ensuing Battle of Rennell Island, the Japanese launched a series of strikes against the American squadron late in the day. The first wave of sixteen Mitsubishi G4M bombers did not engage Columbia, but several G4Ms from the second wave of fifteen aircraft attempted to torpedo her. One attacked individually at around 19:34 and missed, though Columbia's anti-aircraft gunners also missed the bomber. Shortly thereafter, four more G4Ms began attack runs on the ship, two off her port bow and the other pair off her port quarter. Her anti-aircraft guns destroyed one of the G4Ms, and the rest were forced to break off without launching their torpedoes. At around the same time, two of the torpedoes struck Chicago, inflicting severe damage.

Columbia and the other cruisers in the unit closed with Chicago to provide better defense of the damaged vessel, but around 21:30, the Japanese aircraft that were shadowing the Americans withdrew. The task groups split up after midnight but re-formed later in the morning of 30 January. By that time, Chicago's engines had broken down, and she was being towed by the heavy cruiser Louisville at a speed of 4.4 knots (8.1 km/h; 5.1 mph). Columbia remained with Chicago while the tugboat Navajo came from Tulagi; at around 14:30, Columbia and the other light cruisers were detached to head back to Port Havannah on Efate, but around two hours later, the Japanese launched further attacks on Chicago, this time inflicting fatal damage. Columbia's group was too far away to intervene, but the ships' crews nevertheless went to general quarters. The ships arrived at Efate the afternoon of 31 January, but they remained in port for just a day, sorting the following afternoon for patrols off the Santa Cruz Islands.

==== Training operations ====
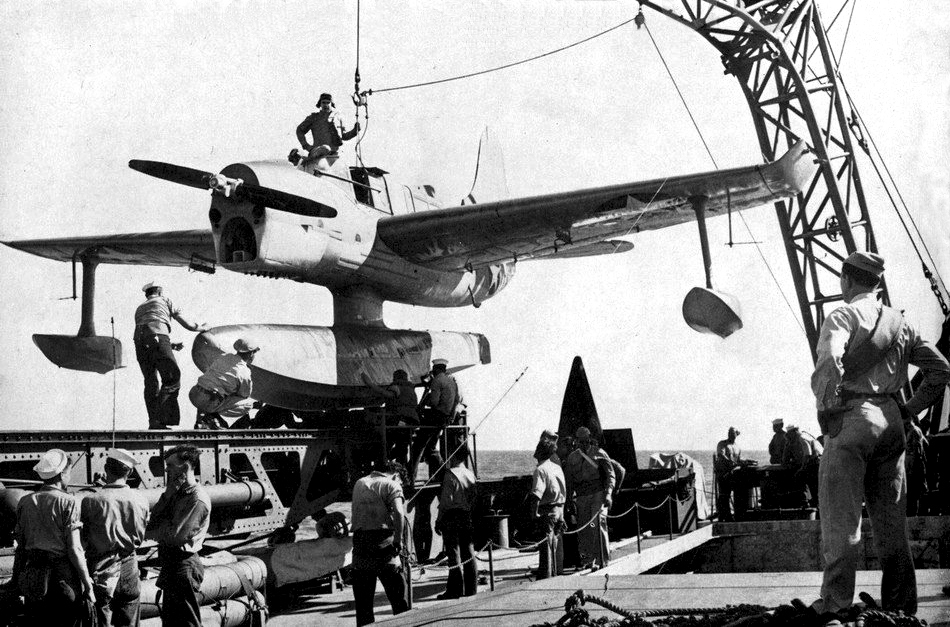
One of Columbia's floatplanes on her catapult

The ships of TF 18 carried out training maneuvers from 1 to 3 February, and then met up with TF 69 the following day; the other task force included the old battleships Maryland, New Mexico, Colorado, and Mississippi, three escort carriers, and several destroyers. The two task forces were to patrol between the Solomons and Samoa to try to intercept a Japanese squadron believed to have sortied from Truk in the central Pacific. The ships remained in the area for several days, searching for the Japanese squadron in vain through 10 February. That day, the Americans learned that the Japanese force had returned to port, and in the meantime, the Japanese had launched Operation Ke, their surprise withdrawal from Guadalcanal. Columbia and the rest of TF 18 accordingly ended their patrolling and returned to Efate. By that time, her sister Denver had arrived there with a replacement turbine for her damaged engine. The ships reached Savannah on 14 February, where she and the rest of Cruiser Division 12 were transferred to TF 68.

The ships of TF 68 sortied again on 19 February, heading back toward the Solomons; this time, they were to divert Japanese attention from an amphibious assault force that was to land on the Russell Islands, codenamed Operation Cleanslate. The cruisers were also to provide close defense of the invasion fleet against a possible raid by Japanese warships. On the night of 20/21 February, the ships passed through Ironbottom Sound, the site of several major naval battles during the Guadalcanal campaign, and anchored in Purvis Bay the following morning. The landings occurred without any opposition and Columbia, with the rest of TF 68, got underway for Noumea on 23 February. While at sea two days later, Columbia was detached to sail to Maré Island, where final repairs to her new turbine would be completed by Prometheus. She arrived there on 27 February, and the work lasted until 11 March. On 16 March, TF 68 was redesignated as TF 19; the ships spent most of the month carrying out training exercises, including maneuvers with TF 14, centered on the carrier Saratoga. Captain Frank Beatty took command of Columbia on 6 April. By this time, the Japanese had effectively abandoned the southern Solomons, leaving little opposition in the area to engage. As a result, Columbia spent the next several months training with the rest of her task force, and occasionally with other units as well.

==== New Georgia campaign ====
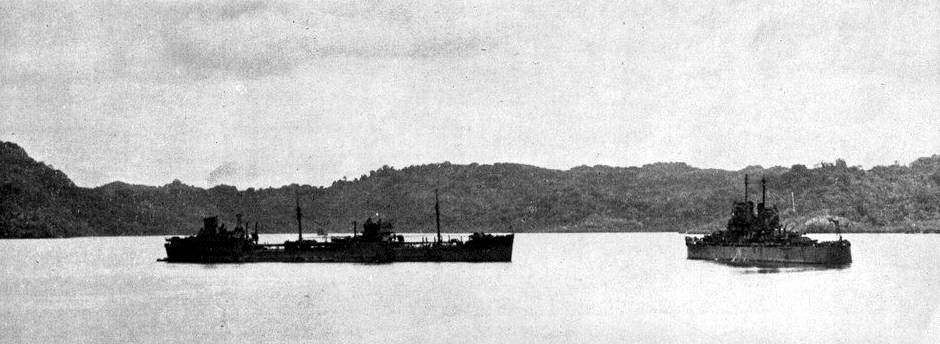
Columbia (right) and an oil tanker in Purvis Bay in 1943

On 27 June, the ships of Cruiser Division 12 were transferred to TG 36.2, and they sortied later that day for Purvis Bay to take part in Operation Toenails, the invasion of the New Georgia Islands in the central Solomons. The ships arrived there two days later and refueled on the morning of 29 June, before departing again to bombard Japanese positions on other, nearby islands. Columbia and her division-mates were assigned to cover minelayers and to shell several of the Shortland Islands to draw Japanese attention away from the landings. Columbia fired some 943 rounds from her main battery and 525 shells from her 5-inc guns at Faisi before the Americans broke off and returned southeast to cover the withdrawal of the minelayers. After refueling at Tulagi, Columbia arrived back in Espiritu Santo on 2 July to replenish ammunition and stores. She sortied with the rest of her unit the following day to return to operations off New Georgia, carrying out patrols in the area between 6 and 11 July, operating out of Purvis Bay or Tulagi during this period. The ship did not encounter significant Japanese forces during these patrols.

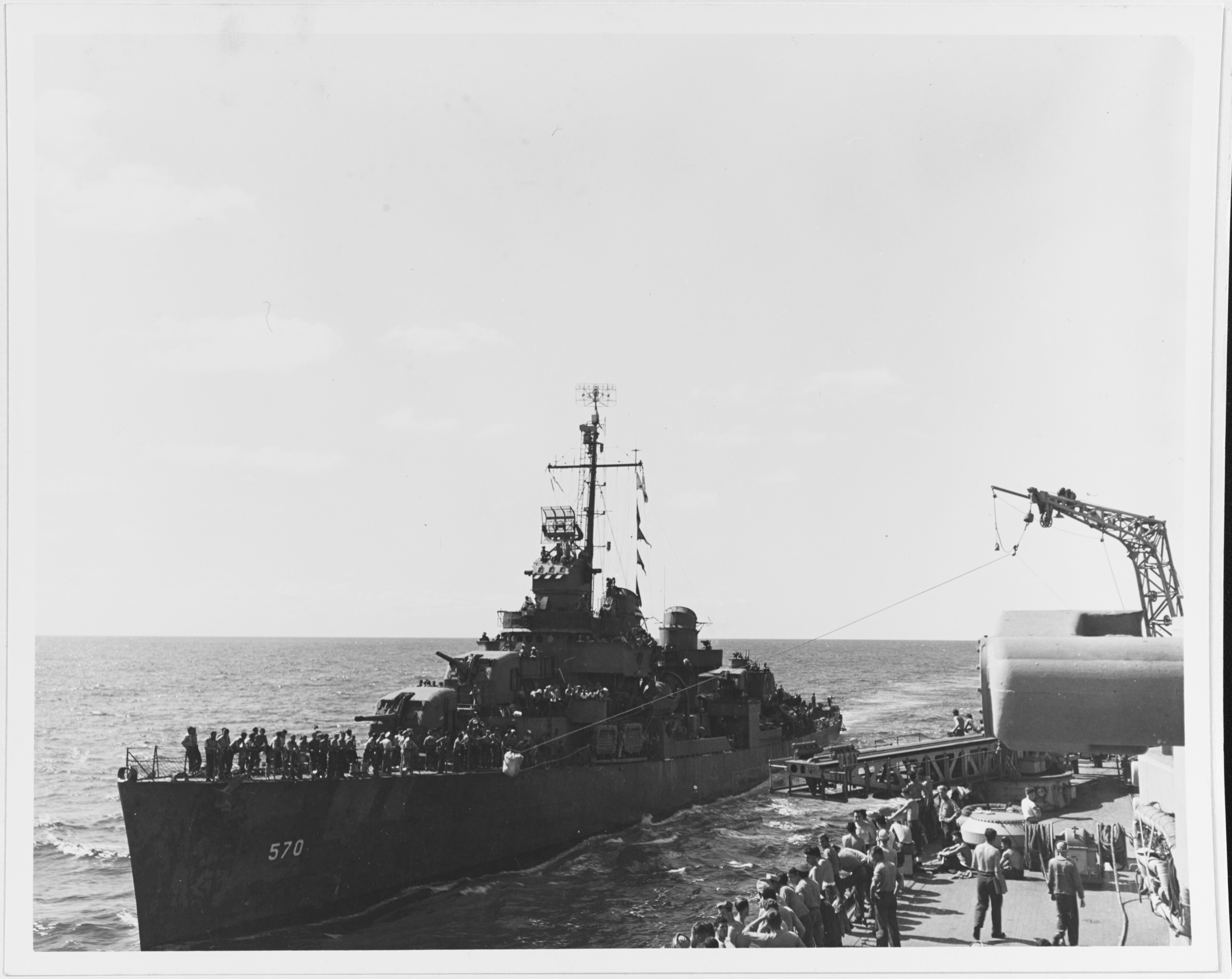
The destroyer USS Charles Ausburne (DD-570) alongside Columbia in September 1943

At around midnight on 12 July, Columbia and the rest of her task group sortied to carry out a bombardment of Munda on New Georgia to support US Army forces fighting during the drive on Munda Point. By about 03:00 on 12 July, the ships had arrived off the island, and Columbia conducted a 30-minute bombardment of the Japanese positions there. The Americans had turned to withdraw by 04:09, bound for Tulagi. Columbia and the rest of Cruiser Division 12 later continued on to Espiritu Santo, arriving there on 18 July. The ships of her task group spent the next two and a half months operating out of Espiritu Santo, patrolling in the Solomons and conducting training exercises in the area, but saw no further combat during this period. On 6 September, Columbia was detached for an overhaul at Sydney, Australia, arriving there four days later. Work was completed by 20 September, allowing the cruiser to return to her unit, which had by then been re-designated again, now as TG 39.2. On arriving on 24 September, she took over the role of task force flagship, under the command of Rear Admiral Aaron S. Merrill.

On 25–26 September, Columbia led her task group on a sweep off Vella LaVella, the westernmost of the New Georgia Islands. Shortly after midnight on 26 September, several Japanese scout planes began shadowing the vessels, and Columbia drove one of them off 5-inch gun fire. The Americans reported a number of torpedo wakes from Japanese submarines believed to have been directed by the scout planes. The ship was not hit by any of the torpedoes, and the task group returned to Tulagi to refuel later that day. Task Group 39.2 made several abortive sorties over the following days, but every time the cruisers were recalled to Tulagi to avoid risking them. The ships returned to Espiritu Santo in early October, but by the 7th, had already returned to the Solomons for training exercises with several warships from other task forces through 10 October.

Admiral William F. Halsey visited Merrill aboard Columbia at Espiritu Santo on 21 October, and he gave a speech to the crew while he was aboard. Three days later, Merrill shifted his flag to Cleveland, and Columbia reverted to serving as the flagship of TG 39.2. The ships got underway later that day to cover Operation Goodtime, the invasion of the Treasury Islands. The assault took place on 27 October, and brought the Allies another step up the Solomon Islands toward Bougainville, the largest island in the Solomons chain. The ships of TF 39 first went to bombard the Japanese airfield at Buka on Bougainville on the night of 31 October – 1 November to destroy aircraft that might try to interfere in the invasion of the Treasury Islands, and to draw Japanese attention away from the invasion fleet. In the early hours of 1 November, Columbia and the rest of TF 39 were spotted by Japanese reconnaissance aircraft, which dropped flares to illuminate the ships for Japanese coastal artillery batteries on Faisi. Columbia and the other cruisers returned fire, and after a short artillery duel, the Americans broke off at around 07:00 to refuel for further operations. The ships of TF 39 remained in the area through the day on 1 November to cover the invasion force as the ground forces went ashore.

===== Battle of Empress Augusta Bay =====
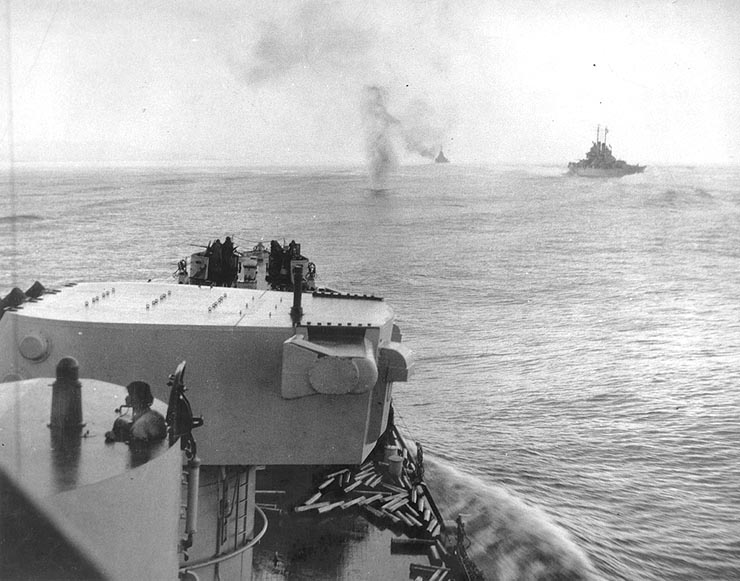
Photograph taken from Columbia on 1 or 2 November 1943; a Japanese plane has crashed directly ahead of the ship

On the evening of 1 November, TF 39 cruised in Empress Augusta Bay in Bougainville, when shortly before 01:00, the American ships picked up a Japanese surface force approaching. In the ensuing Battle of Empress Augusta Bay, the Americans fired first at around 02:45, the destroyers launching a spread of torpedoes at the oncoming Japanese squadron, which consisted of the heavy cruisers Myōkō and Haguro, the light cruisers Sendai and Agano, and the destroyers Shigure, Samidare, Shiratsuyu, Naganami, Wakatsuki, and Hatsukaze, along with four more destroyers—Amagiri, Yūnagi, Uzuki, and Yūzuki—serving as fast transports. A few minutes after the destroyers launched their torpedoes, Cleveland and Denver, followed shortly thereafter by Columbia, opened fire at a range of around 21,000 yd (19,000 m). The Japanese destroyer began maneuvering erratically in a circle, indicating it was disabled. Columbia shifted fire to another vessel, which soon turned away and withdrew out of range. Columbia then engaged a third vessel for several minutes, from 03:11 to 03:32. By that time, Columbia had been hit once in return, but the shell struck her bow and did negligible damage.

Both sides had ceased firing by 03:35 and the Japanese had turned back for Rabaul. The American squadron likewise disengaged and returned to cover the invasion fleet. In the course of the action, the Americans had sunk Sendai and Hatsukaze and damaged Myoko and Haguro; and in the confusion, the two heavy cruisers collided, causing further damage. In return, several American destroyers were damaged in the engagement, including Foote, which had been crippled by a Japanese torpedo. For his role in the battle, Beatty was awarded the Navy Cross; the ship received the Navy Unit Commendation, and Cruiser Division 12 was awarded the Presidential Unit Citation. On 3 November, TF 39 escorted the invasion fleet back to Purvis Bay.

==== End of the Solomons campaign ====
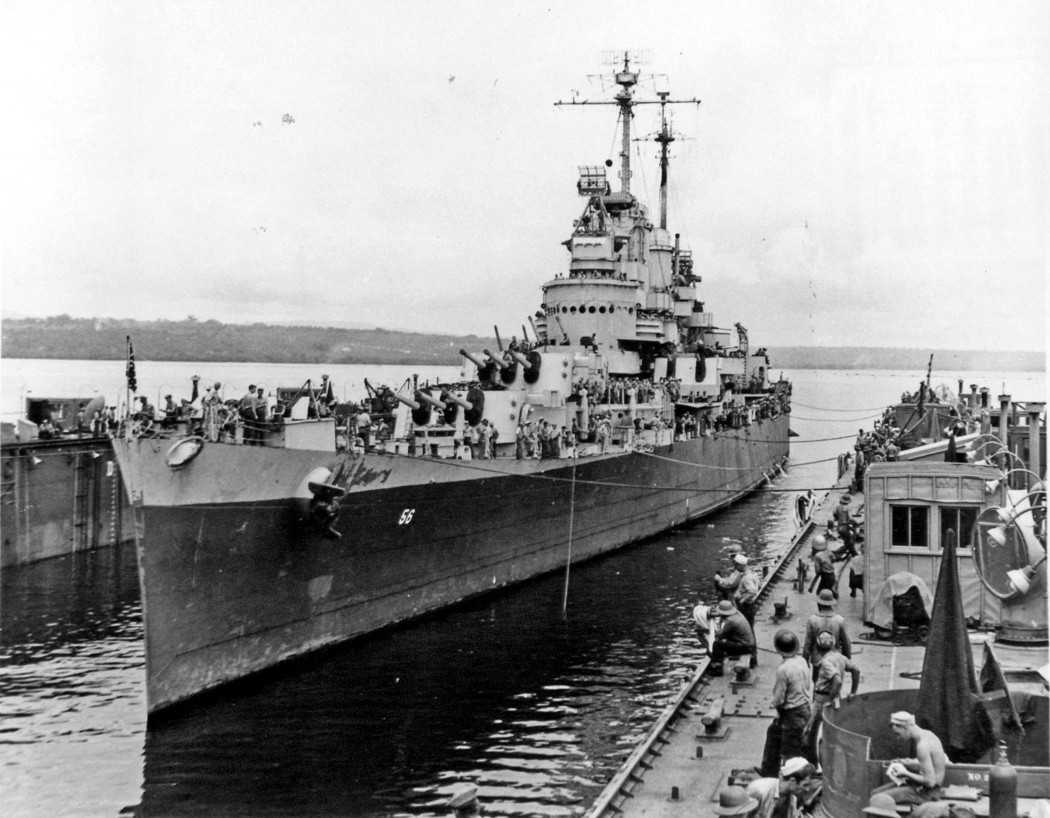
Columbia in dry dock in January 1944

Columbia and other elements of TF 39 returned to Empress Augusta Bay on 4 November to resume operations in support of subsequent landings on Bougainville. The ships remained on station for several days, patrolling for Japanese warships and frequently fending off Japanese search planes and bombers. On 13 November, Denver was torpedoed and disabled by a G4M bomber; Columbia and the rest of the task force escorted her as she was towed out of the area. Columbia spent the rest of November anchored at Purvis Bay, and on 1 December, she had an FH radar set installed. The next day, she sortied to calibrate the new radar; various training exercises followed for several days, until 7 December, when she and the rest of TF 39 made a sweep between Buka and Rabaul that failed to locate any Japanese vessels. On the night of 23–24 December, she bombarded Buka again, damaging the airfield there. Columbia departed for Espiritu Santo on 3 January 1944, arriving there the following day. She was dry docked there from 19 to 26 January for periodic maintenance. In February, the ships of TF 39 returned to patrol duty between Buka and Rabaul, but they saw no significant action for the first two weeks of the month.

On 13 February, Columbia and the rest of her task force got underway to participate in the invasion of the Green Islands, which were situated between Bougainville and Rabaul. The invasion was one of the last stages of Operation Cartwheel, the plan to neutralize Rabaul. The ships remained on station through 16 February and did not encounter significant Japanese forces. The ships then returned to Purvis Bay, where they remained for the rest of the month. On 5 March, the ships sortied for a sweep between Truk and Kavieng to search for Japanese shipping, but arrived back in Purvis on 11 March without having found any ships to attack.

The ships of TF 39 next sortied on 17 March to take part in the landing on Emirau, the last component of Operation Cartwheel. The ships reached the islands late on 19 March, the day before the landings. No opposition was encountered on the island, so Columbia did not need to provide fire support. The ships remained on station for another day, but returned to Purvis Bay on 23 March. She remained there for the next two weeks, seeing no further action. On 4 April, she departed for San Francisco, California, for a thorough overhaul. The work lasted from 23 April to 20 June, and during this period, Captain Maurice E. Curts relieved Beatty as the ship's commander. Defects with her main battery elevation gear identified during post-overhaul trials necessitated further work, and she was not ready to return to operations in the Pacific until 29 June. She reached Pearl Harbor on 6 July, where additional minor repairs were identified. Underway again on 13 July, she carried out further testing and exercises in Hawaiian waters through the end of the month.

=== Mariana and Palau Islands campaign ===
Columbia continued to experience mechanical problems into August; the period from to 2 to 8 August was spent attempting to correct the gas ejection system of Turret IV. Training exercises followed on 9 August, and with her main battery now fully operational, was assigned to Task Group 31.12, part of the fire support group for the upcoming invasion of Anguar. She left Pearl Harbor to join the unit on 12 August, passing through Guadalcanal on the way, and arriving in Purvis Bay on 24 August. There she rejoined Cruiser Division 12, which was a component of TG 32.12; the ships sortied on the afternoon of 29 August to participate in a mock landing at Cape Esperance, though the group was missing the battleships Tennessee and California, which had been delayed. The practice landing took place the following morning and additional shooting practice occurred on 31 August.

By early September, the two battleships had arrived, and the task group sortied on the morning of 6 September. Late on 11 September, the ships closed with the island to begin preparations for the bombardment of Anguar the following morning. Columbia opened fire at 06:00 and spent most of the day bombarding targets on Anguar; one of her seaplanes crashed on landing next to the ship, though the crew was rescued and the plane was quickly replaced. At 17:51, Columbia departed from the island for the night. She carried out a similar schedule of bombardment over the following two days, though on 14 September, she also helped to cover the activities of underwater demolition teams as they cleared paths for the landing force. Bombardment missions continued on 15 September, when neighboring Peleliu was invaded. On 17 September, American forces went ashore on Anguar; Columbia patrolled off shore to provide fire support as the soldiers fought their way across the island, though by 19 September, this was no longer necessary and she withdrew to refuel on the 20th. The ship then proceeded to Kossol Roads in Palau to replenish ammunition and supplies.

On 25 September, Columbia departed in company with Task Unit 32.19.9, bound for Seeadler Harbor, Manus Island, part of the Admiralty Islands. The unit also included the older battleships Maryland, Pennsylvania, Idaho, Tennessee, Mississippi, the heavy cruisers Louisville and Minneapolis, the light cruiser Denver, and an escort of six destroyers. The ships arrived in Manus on the afternoon of 28 September, where they refueled. The task unit was dissolved there, and in early October, Columbia underwent minor repairs and replenished ammunition and other supplies. On 6 October, she was assigned to Task Group 77.2, part of the Seventh Fleet. The unit remained in Manus until 12 October, when the ships sortied to begin the campaign to liberate the Philippines.

=== Philippines campaign ===
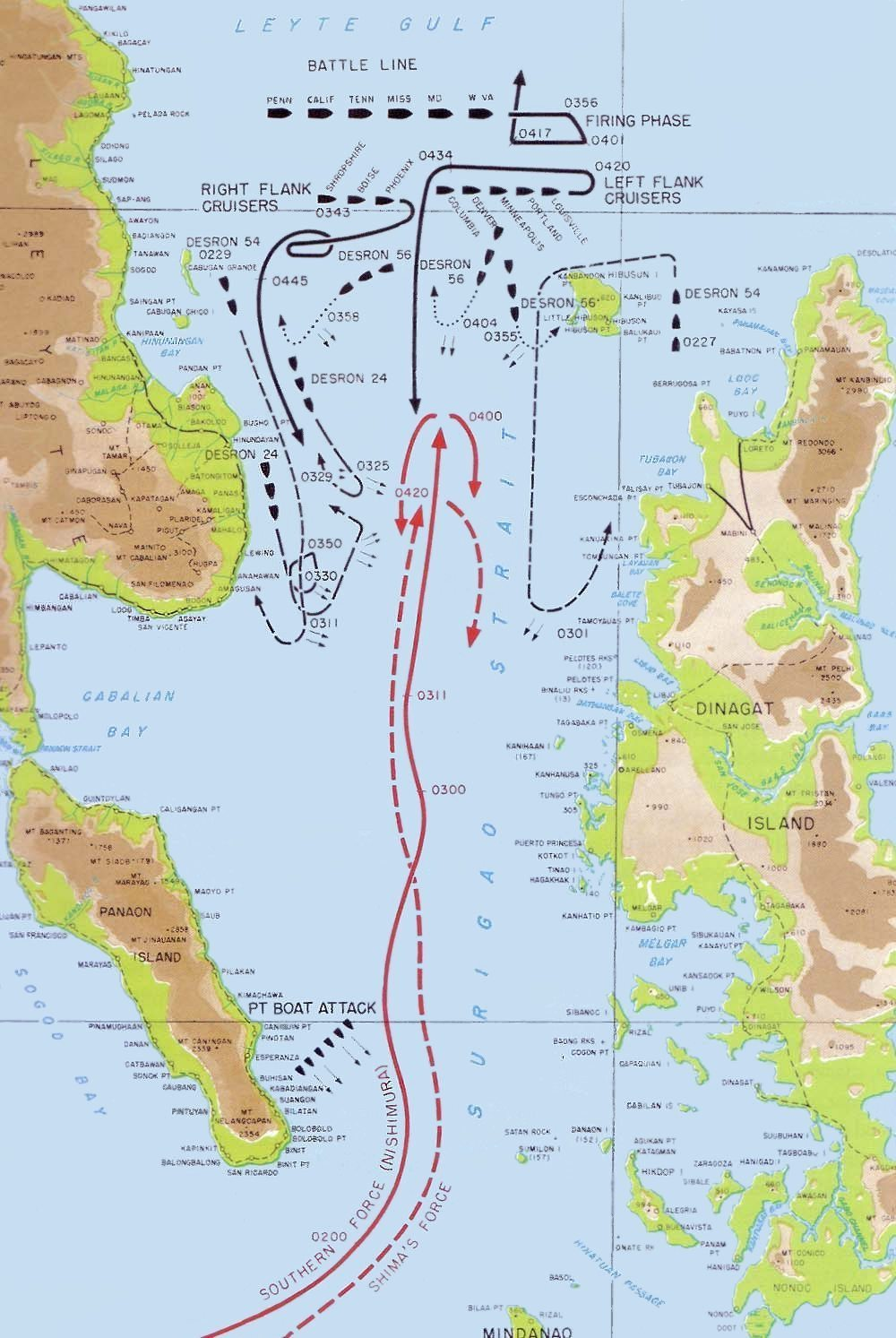
Map of the American and Japanese fleets' maneuvers during the Battle of Surigao Strait

==== Battles of Leyte and Leyte Gulf ====
While en route, Columbia refueled from the fleet oiler Salamonie on 16 October. The next day, she was assigned to Task Unit 78.4.3, part of the fire support force for the assault on Dinagat Island, the preparatory bombardment for which began later on the 17th. Columbia shelled Japanese positions over the following week, and during that period she contributed her anti-aircraft battery to the invasion fleet's defense. Following the attack on Dingat, the fleet moved on to Leyte on 20 October. During the landings on Leyte, Columbia provided fire support and engaged in counter-battery fire against Japanese mortars. Late on the 20th, a Nakajima B5N torpedo bomber appeared, forcing Columbia to take evasive maneuvers. The Japanese aircraft hit the light cruiser Honolulu, inflicting serious damage. Columbia came alongside to provide assistance, including sending part of her medical staff to tend to the wounded. Columbia remained on station for the next few days, providing fire support to the soldiers fighting their way across the island. She remained on station through 24 October.

In response to the Allied invasion of the Philippines, Japan launched a major naval counter-attack that resulted in the Battle of Leyte Gulf. Late on the 24th, the Seventh Fleet commander—Vice Admiral Thomas Kinkaid—received reports that a Japanese force was approaching from the south, and would pass through the Surigao Strait to attack the invasion fleet. The Japanese force, centered on the battleships Yamashiro and Fusō, was commanded by Vice Admiral Shōji Nishimura. Kinkaid ordered the bombardment force, which included Columbia, to take up a blocking position at the exit of the strait to protect the fleet. In the ensuing action early the following morning, Columbia assisted in the destruction of the Japanese force. By around 5:30, Nishimura had been defeated, and soon thereafter, Columbia was detached to finish off crippled Japanese ships. She assisted in the sinking of the destroyer Asagumo during this period. She received no hits in return. Columbia and Denver were nearly out of ammunition by this point, and were detached to rearm later on 25 October.

==== Patrolling Leyte Gulf and the Battle of Mindoro ====
Columbia spent the next four days refueling and rearming, but these operations were repeatedly interrupted by the need to take evasive maneuvers in response to heavy Japanese air attacks. These included several attempted kamikaze strikes. After finishing resupplying fuel and ammunition, Columbia provided anti-aircraft defense to other ships attempting to replenish. On 29 October, the ships of TG 77.2 departed for Seeadler Harbor, arriving there on 3 November. There, the ships made preparations for the next major operation in the Philippines campaign. On 10 November, TG 77.2 got underway for Kossol Roads, where they refueled and joined supply convoys headed to the Philippines. Beginning on 14 November, Columbia and the other ships patrolled Leyte Gulf, covering the convoys as they carried reinforcements and supplies to the Philippines. The ships came under repeated air attacks, but Columbia was only attacked directly once, on 18 November, by a Aichi D3A dive bomber. The ship's anti-aircraft gunners shot down the plane, which missed with its bomb. She remained on station through the end of the month, and on 27 November, the Japanese launched a major strike on the ships in Leyte Gulf. During this battle, Columbia shot down three Yokosuka D4Y torpedo bombers, and kamikazes struck Colorado and the light cruiser St. Louis.

After refueling underway on 30 November, Columbia resumed patrol duties in the gulf in December. A Japanese submarine attacked TG 77.2 late on the afternoon of 1 December, but failed to damage any of the ships. TG 77.2 withdrew to Kossol Roads on 4 December to replenish supplies. Columbia was transferred to TG 77.12 on 5 December, part of the invasion fleet for the upcoming attack on Mindoro. The ships sortied on 10 December to begin the operation against Mindoro. By 13 December, the fleet had arrived off the target island, and the Japanese responded with concerted air attacks, which Columbia helped to defend against, shooting down one Mitsubishi Ki-21 bomber. Japanese attacks continued the following day, though the combat air patrol fighters intercepted the initial waves. After engaging a subsequent strike later in the afternoon, the ship's forward 5-inch mount accidentally fired a shell while the crew were attempting to unload it. The gun was pointed at the port side director for the 40 mm guns; it hit the structure and killed four men inside. Another thirty men were wounded, six of whom were seriously hurt. The four fatalities were buried at sea the next day. The landing on Mindoro began on the morning of 15 December, and during the landing, Columbia destroyed a pair of Japanese bombers that closed with the invasion fleet, and assisted in the destruction of other planes, including a pair of kamikazes that attempted to hit the escort carrier Marcus Island.

Over the following few days, Columbia provided gunfire support to the soldiers fighting inland from the beachhead and contributed her anti-aircraft battery to the defense of supply ships that were bringing reinforcements to the island. On 17 December, the ships of TG 77.12 departed for Kossol Roads; on the way, Columbia refueled some of the escorting destroyers. The ships arrived there late on 19 December, refilled their oil bunkers, and then departed the next day for Seeadler Harbor. They reached their destination on 23 December, and the ships' crews immediately began preparations for the next major phase of the Philippines campaign. Columbia sortied again on 26 December, steaming in company with Battleship Division 4, once more bound for Kossol Roads. On the way, the ships conducted various training exercises, including shooting practice.

==== Battle of Lingayen Gulf ====
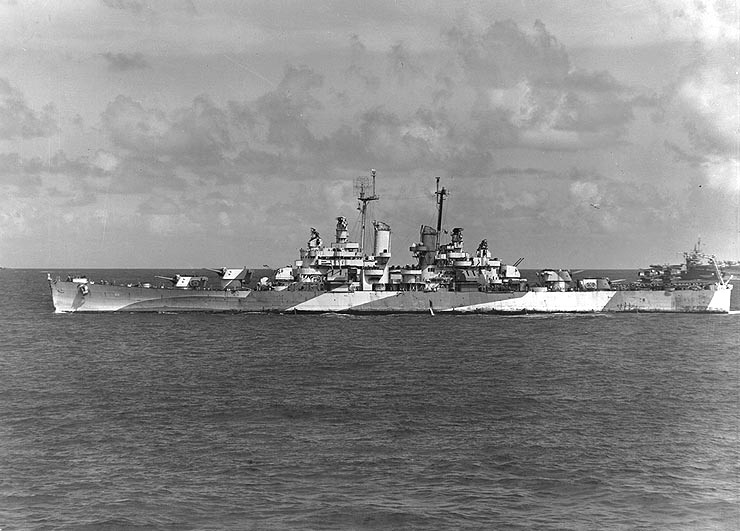
Columbia in Surigao Strait in January 1945, en route to Lingayen Gulf

On 1 January 1945, Columbia was returned to TG 77.2, which was again part of the bombardment force for the invasion of Lingayen Gulf on the main island of Luzon. The ships departed Kossol Roads early that morning, and after entering Filipino waters late on the 2nd, the ships arranged themselves in a defensive formation around several escort carriers. Columbia formed part of the rearguard formation. On the morning of 3 January, Japanese reconnaissance aircraft spotted the American fleet, which instigated a series of increasingly severe kamikaze attacks over the following two days. These included a strike on the escort carrier Ommaney Bay on 4 January that resulted in the destruction of the vessel. Heavy strikes followed on 5 January, and several vessels were hit. That night, Columbia moved into the vanguard formation; Japanese aircraft shadowed the fleet through the night to track its movements.

The next morning, the ships of TG 77.2 began their preparatory bombardment of Santiago Island, which lay at the western end of Lingayen Gulf. Heavy kamikaze attacks met the Allied ships, and several vessels were hit that day. As the vessels were preparing to enter Lingayen Gulf itself later that afternoon, a Mitsubishi A6M Zero kamikaze dove on Columbia, but heavy anti-aircraft fire forced the plane to pull up at the last moment. The plane struck the ship's radio antennae and crashed into the sea just beyond her starboard side. Fuel from the Zero sprayed across the ship, but failed to ignite. About an hour later, the Allied ships entered a channel that had been swept of mines to bombard the invasion beaches, but the channel dramatically reduced their ability to take evasive maneuvers in the face of determined kamikaze attacks, and after less than two hours of bombardment, the Allies were forced to retreat.

Shortly after the ships reversed course—placing Columbia in the lead of the formation—an Aichi D3A dove on Columbia. The ship's gunners struck the oncoming plane, but did not damage it sufficiently to prevent it from crashing into her deck abreast of the rearmost turret. The dive bomber was carrying an 800 kg (1,800 lb) armor-piercing bomb, which penetrated into the ship before exploding. The blast started a major fire, disabled both after turrets, and caused significant flooding aft. Seventeen men were killed in the attack, sixty were wounded, and another twenty were missing. Columbia's seaplane was also destroyed in the attack. But the ship remained in action, and her anti-aircraft gunners soon contributed to the destruction of another kamikaze that attempted to crash into HMAS Australia. Her forward turrets also continued to bombard targets ashore as the task group withdrew. In total, 21 ships were hit by kamikazes over the course of the day's operations.

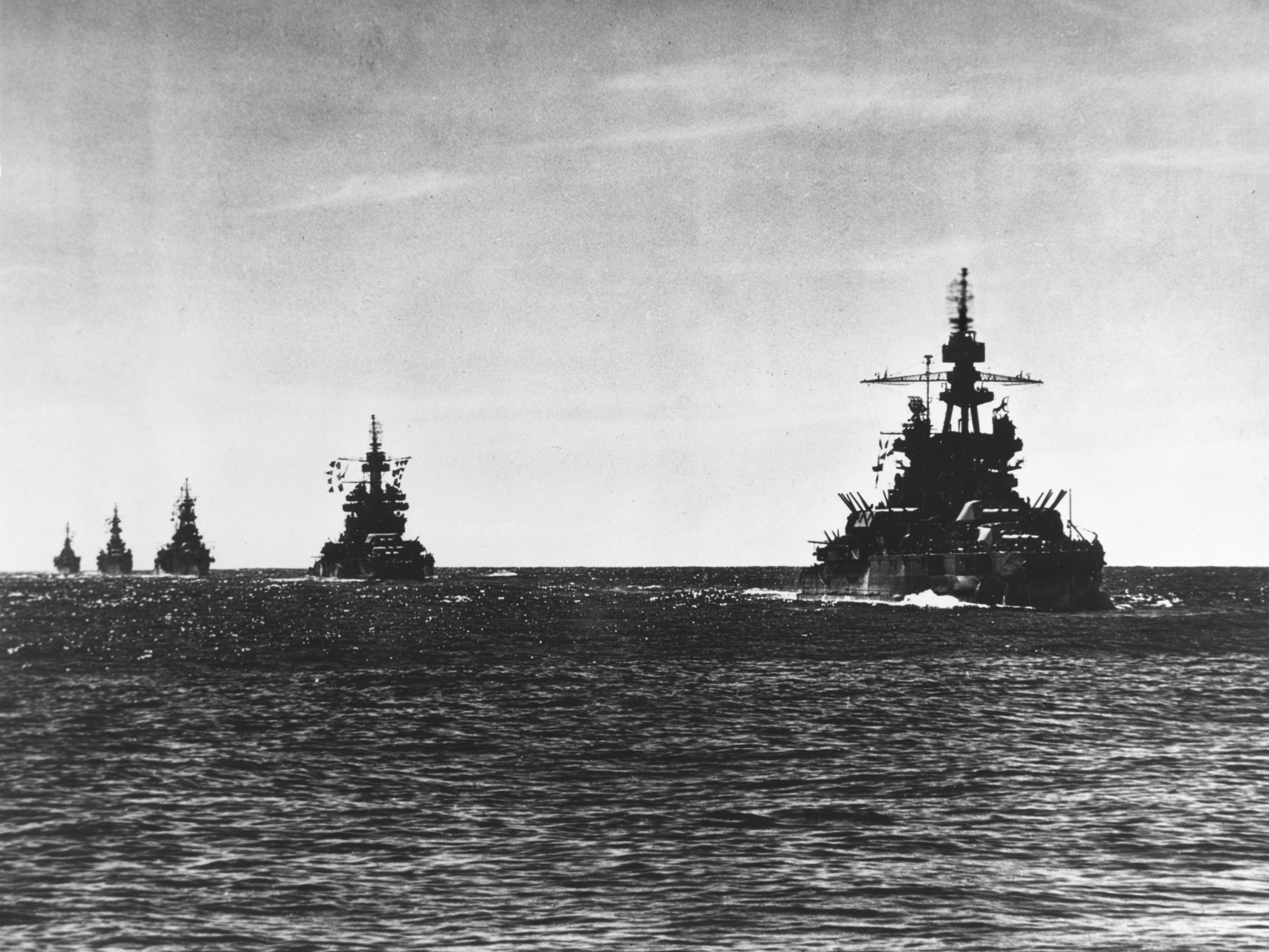
US warships entering Lingayen Gulf; Columbia is the last vessel in line

Through 8 January, the ships remained in the area, continuing their shore bombardment mission, though Japanese air attacks tapered during this period. Columbia's crew continued to make repairs to the ship to control flooding. The invasion began the next morning, which prompted a resumption of heavy kamikaze attacks. At around 07:45, a Nakajima Ki-44 fighter crashed into Columbia, knocking her forward main battery fire control director completely off the ship. The plane was carrying a 250 kg (550 lb) bomb, which detonated on the deck and started a fire and inflicted heavy casualties. The strike killed 17 men, wounded another 97, and six were declared missing. In total, the two kamikaze attacks had inflicted 191 casualties. In the days that followed, several of the more severely wounded men died from their injuries. Columbia nevertheless remained on station for the rest of the day, providing gunfire to soften up the beach defenses and then close-range support the troops as they fought their way ashore. Through the day, wounded men were evacuated to the transport Harris and repair work was begun. Another vessel sent medical supplies to Columbia to assist with treatment of the casualties still aboard the ship.

For their actions during the battle, numerous men received awards for valor, including Curts, who was awarded a Silver Star; 170 men received Purple Hearts. The crew was also awarded a Navy Unit Commendation for remaining in action after three kamikaze strikes and heavy casualties. With the ground forces having successfully landed with little Japanese opposition, Columbia received orders at 17:50 to depart as part of the escort for Task Force 79, the amphibious assault transports. About forty minutes later, the ships began steaming out of the gulf, and Columbia rendezvoused with the force as it assembled off San Fernando. By 21:30, the ships were underway for Leyte Gulf. The ships sailed south, and by 12 January they had reached the Mindanao Sea, where Columbia and several other ships that had been damaged by kamikazes were ordered north to San Pedro Bay at Leyte. There, the ships received emergency repairs; for Columbia, this included patching a pair of holes below the waterline by divers. On 14 January, she got underway for Seeadler Harbor in company with the other damaged ships and screened by destroyers, arriving on 18 January. For her actions during the battle, Columbia was awarded a second Presidential Unit Citation.

Kamikaze strikes on Columbia
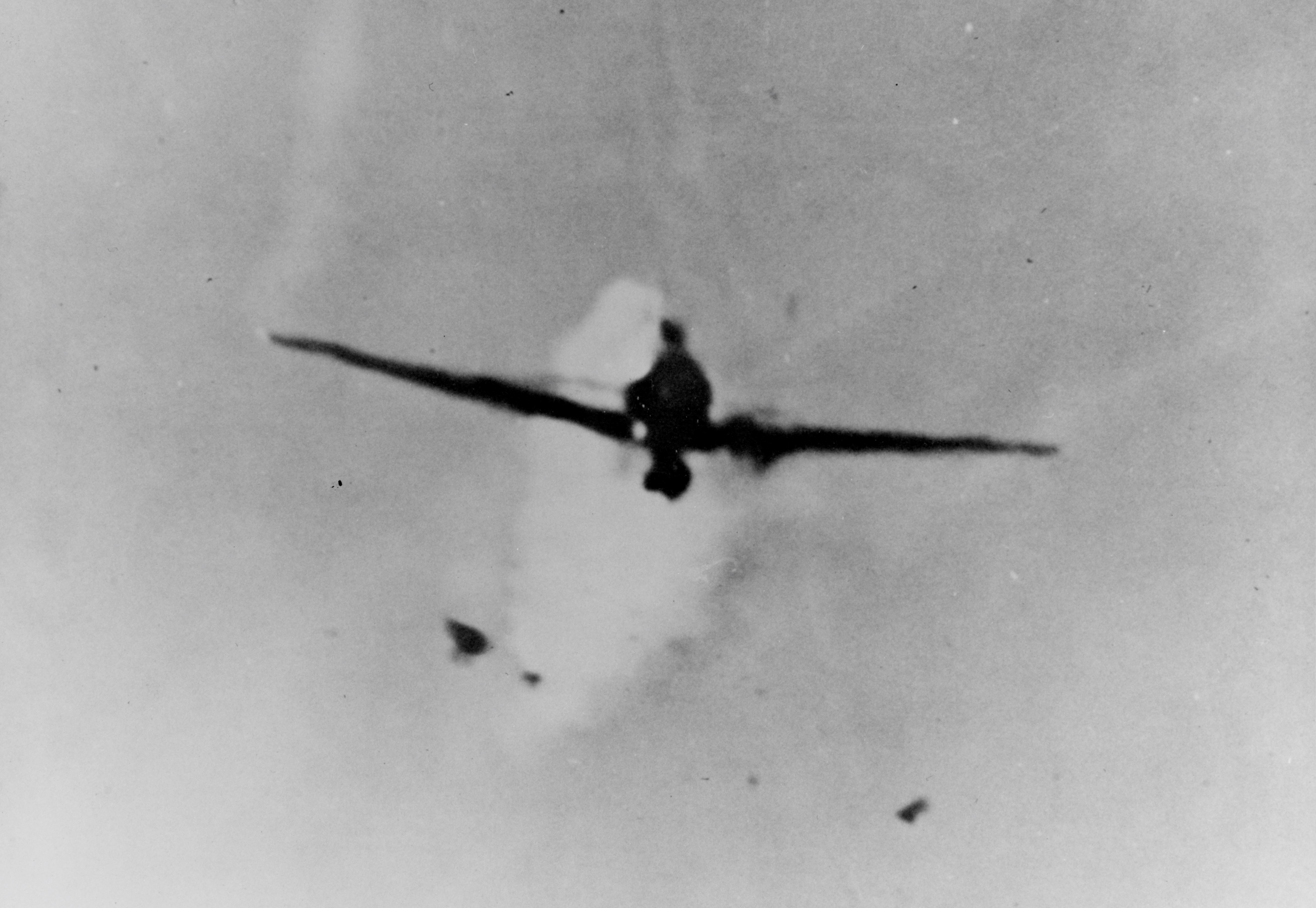
The Mitsubishi A6M Zero kamikaze moments before it struck Columbia's antennae on 6 January. Note fragments of the plane falling off as the ship's anti-aircraft guns attempted to shoot it down

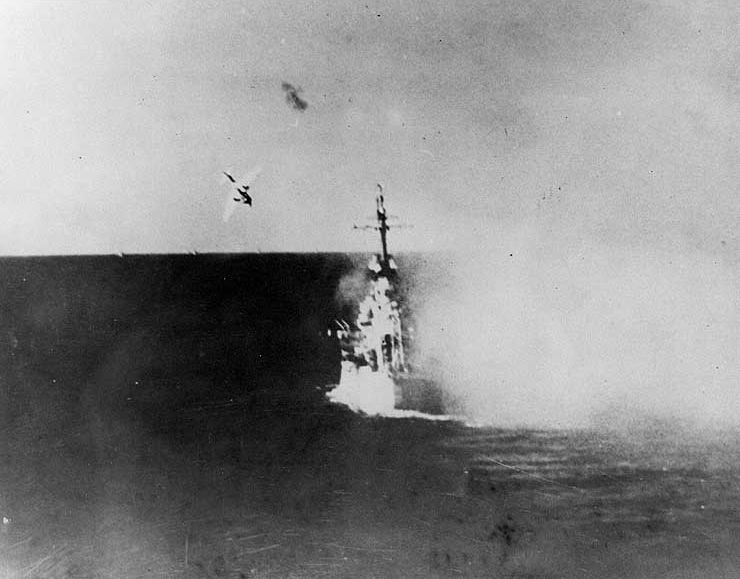
Columbia is attacked by a kamikaze off Lingayen Gulf, 6 January 1945

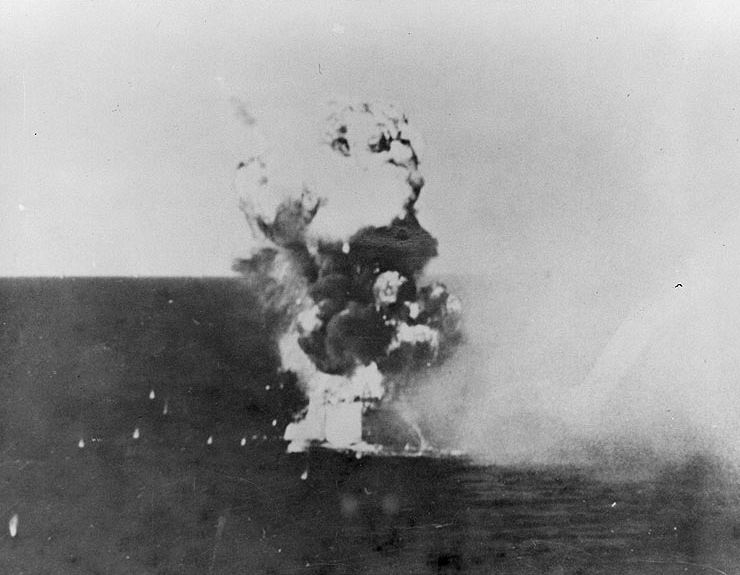
The kamikaze hit Columbia at 17:29. The plane and its bomb penetrated two decks before exploding, killing 13 and wounding 44

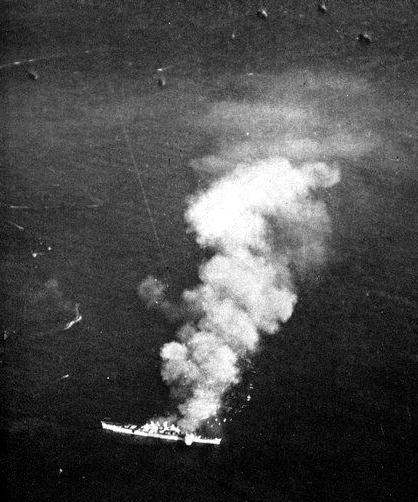
Columbia burning after the kamikaze strikes

=== Repairs ===
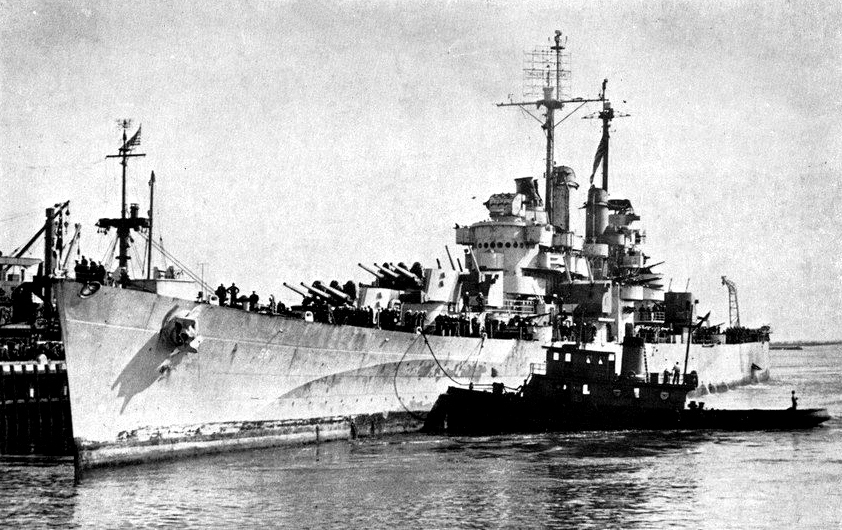
Columbia arriving in California for repairs

Columbia remained at Seeadler Harbor From 19 to 21 January, where temporary repairs were effected to permit the ship to make the voyage back to the United States. These included patching the hull with concrete and reinforcing internal supports that had been damaged by the impacts and fires. Ammunition was also removed from damaged areas where possible. The ship departed on 22 January, bound for Pearl Harbor, and while en route, she met up with Louisville and the destroyer Walke, both of which had also been badly damaged in the Lingayen Gulf operation. The ships arrived in Pearl Harbor on 29 January. Columbia underwent an inspection to determine the scale of the damage, during which time additional temporary repairs were made. On 6 February, she left for San Pedro, California, for a thorough overhaul and permanent repairs. She arrived there on 11 February and was dry-docked the next day.

Repair work and modifications lasted into mid-April, and on the 17th, she underwent her first round of sea trials. Full power tests were carried out on 24 April, though the tests ended in failure when fires broke out and oil pressure could not be maintained in her starboard engine. After repairs, another attempt was made on 29 April, which was completed successfully. Over the following five days, further tests were carried out, including test firing the main and secondary batteries, and ammunition was loaded. The upgrades to the ship included replacing the single 20 mm Oerlikons with twin mounts, improved radars were installed, and the main battery turrets were improved for better night firing capabilities. On 4 May, the ship sailed to begin training exercises in preparation to return to combat. During full power tests on 7 May, one of her turbines leaked, necessitating another round of repairs in dry dock. She was able to resume testing on 13 May, and was pronounced fit for service later that day. On 15 May, she departed for Pearl Harbor.

On the way to Pearl Harbor, Columbia's crew conducted training exercises. After arriving on 20 May, the crew carried out maintenance work from 21 to 23 May. The ship took part in combat training exercises from 24 to 30 May, and then remained at anchor from 31 May to 2 June. The ship departed to return to the western Pacific that day, joining Task Unit 12.5.5 for the voyage to Ulithi, which was by then the fleet's forward operating base in the Caroline Islands. The ships arrived there on 13 June, and the task unit was thereafter dissolved.

=== End of the war ===
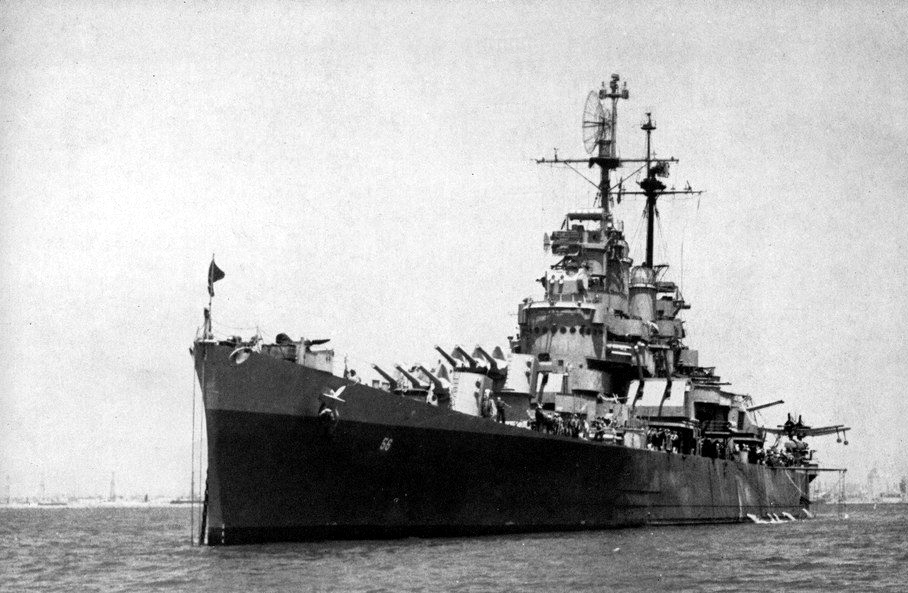
Columbia at anchor in 1945

On 14 June, Columbia and several destroyers left for Leyte, where two days later, Columbia was assigned to the covering force for the invasion of Balikpapap in Borneo. She departed on 19 June and rejoined her old unit, Cruiser Division 12, four days later; the unit included Denver and Montpelier, and formed part of Task Group 74.2. The preparatory bombardments began later on 23 June and continued for several days. During this period, on 26 June, she picked up survivors from two minesweepers that struck mines and sank. The landings took place on 1 July, and Columbia provided fire support as the men made their way inland. TG 74.2 was then sent south on 2 July to patrol against any Japanese naval forces that might try to interfere with the landing, though none appeared, and the ships of Cruiser Division 12 were soon ordered north to Leyte. They arrived in San Pedro Bay on 5 July, and Columbia's crew immediately set about refueling, carrying out maintenance on the ship, and conducting training while in harbor.

On 7 July, Columbia and her sisters in the division were assigned to Task Force 95, which had been created to sweep across the East China Sea to search for Japanese merchant shipping in the area. The unit was centered on the two Alaska-class large cruisers. The ships sailed north on 13 July, stopping in Buckner Bay, Okinawa, to refuel, before beginning their sweep late on 16 July. A typhoon forced the ships to withdraw to the east on 17 and 18 July, though they had resumed their patrol to the Chinese coast the following day. They encountered little of note, beyond a stray Japanese aircraft and several sampans, before returning to Okinawa on 22 July. Four days later, the ships sortied again for another sweep, this time into the Yellow Sea. While cruising off Shanghai, China, lookouts spotted several vessels but determined they were crewed by Chinese citizens, and so the American ships did not engage them. They returned to Okinawa on 29 July, once again having failed to locate any significant Japanese activity.

The ships of TF 95 sorties again on 1 August, but another typhoon forced them to withdraw to the south the following day. They returned to the operational area on 3 August, and over the following days, the ships encountered a few Japanese aircraft, though the escorting combat air patrol shot them down or drove them off without incident. Columbia and the rest of the task group arrived back in Okinawa on the morning of 8 August. The ships remained in port for the next several days, until 13 August, when they sortied briefly. After returning to port on 15 August, the ships were informed of the Japanese decision to surrender. The unit carried out training exercises in the area east of Okinawa through the end of the month. For the ship's actions during the war, Columbia received ten battle stars, in addition to the two Navy Unit Commendations.

Columbia was initially assigned to the force that was to begin the occupation of Japan, as part of Task Force 56. The ship's orders were changed shortly after the unit got underway on 9 September, and she was redirected to the Mariana Islands. She stopped at Iwo Jima on the way and embarked passengers bound for Saipan in the Marianas. She arrived in Saipan on 15 September, sent the passengers ashore, and then embarked others to take them to Guam. After reaching Apra Harbor on Guam on 18 September, Vice Admiral George D. Murray made the vessel his flagship. She remained in Guam for the rest of the month, but on 1 October, she got underway to take inspection parties to Truk to oversee the recently surrendered Japanese garrison there. She arrived there two days later and embarked a Japanese delegation that included Vice Admiral Chūichi Hara and Lieutenant General Toshisaburo Mugikura. Over the following days, the inspection party landed and several islands in the atoll. They found that the Japanese garrison was in poor condition, owing to shortages of food and medical supplies; that most of the facilities had been destroyed by bombing during the war; and that coastal artillery batteries had been disabled by the removal of their breechblocks.

The ship then returned to Guam, arriving in Apra on 8 October. She was dry-docked there on 11 October for periodic maintenance along with repairs to her number 3 propeller shaft. Work was completed by 15 October, and she remained in port for the next three days. Columbia spent the rest of the month shuttling soldiers, sailors, and marines between Guam, Saipan, and Iwo Jima. On 19 October, she took on passengers for transport to Saipan, arriving the following day. She then embarked other men, who were en route to Iwo Jima, and sailed later on 20 October. The ship reached that island two days later and exchanged her passengers for another group of men who were traveling to Saipan. Arriving there on 24 October, Columbia disembarked those travelers, embarked others headed to Iwo Jima, and sailed again later that evening. The ship reached Iwo Jima on the morning of 25 October, embarked another group to return to Saipan. By 28 October, she was back in Saipan, where she took on other men bound for Guam, which was to be the last of her regional shuttle trips. Columbia got underway for the West Coast of the United States on 31 October, carrying more than 500 passengers bound for home. She stopped in Pearl Harbor on the way, where some of the passengers left the ship, before continuing on to San Pedro, California, arriving on 17 November.

=== Post-war service ===
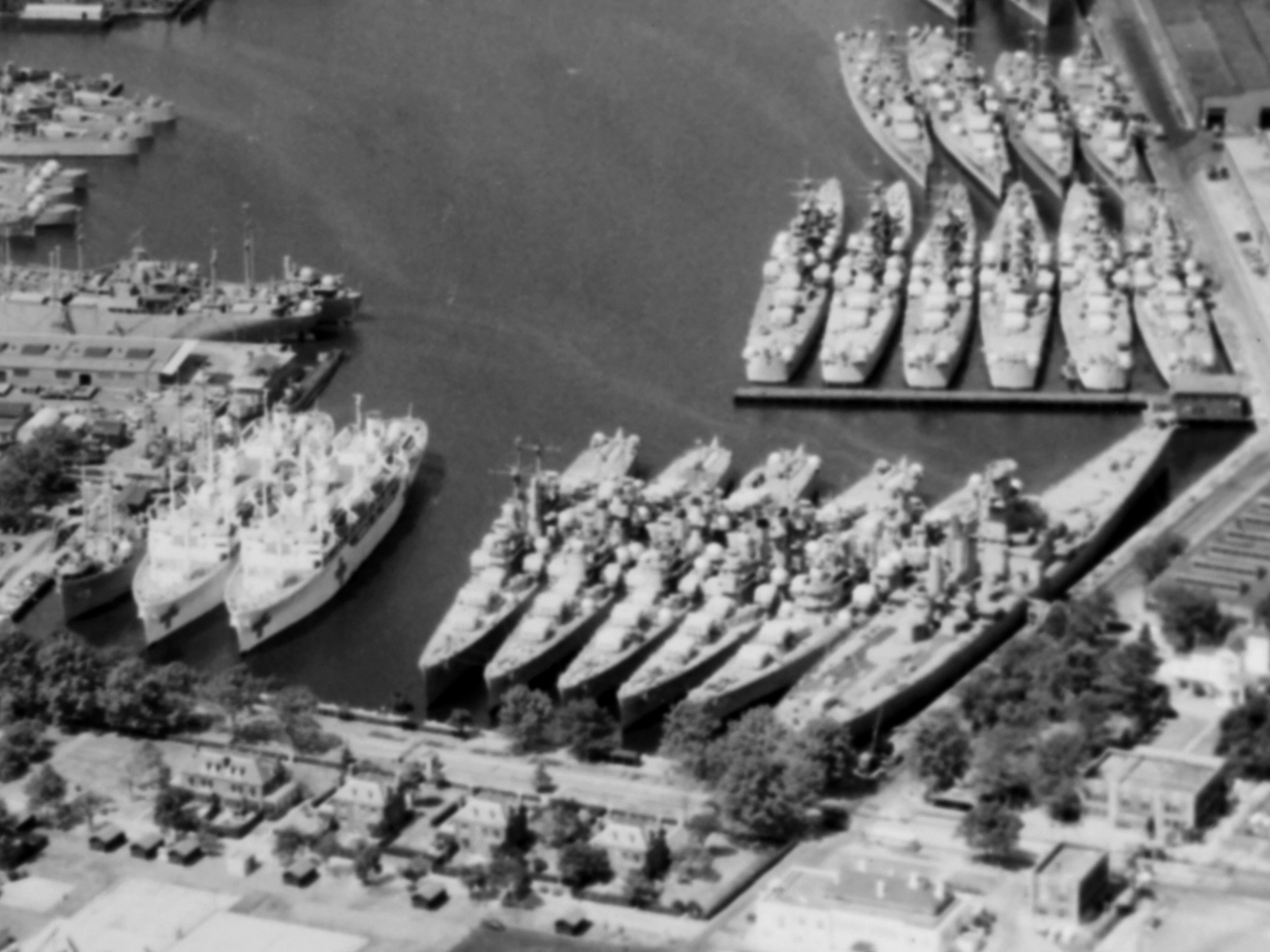
Part of the Atlantic Reserve Fleet in Philadelphia in 1955; Columbia is one of the vessels in the first row

Columbia left California on 20 November, bound for the East Coast of the United States. She briefly cruised with her sister Cleveland while on the way, before passing through the Panama Canal on 30 November. Columbia arrived in the Philadelphia Naval Shipyard on 5 December, where and overhaul was carried out. In early 1946, the ship was assigned to training duties for naval cadets from the US Naval Reserve. On 24 February, the first such voyage began with a contingent of 168 men from the Naval Reserve Officer Training Corps. The ship sailed to Chesapeake Bay, then to Hampton Roads, Virginia, before returning to Philadelphia on 2 March. She next moved to Newport, Rhode Island, on 25 March, to begin the next training cruise.

On 1 June, Columbia was assigned to the Sixteenth Fleet, part of the Atlantic Reserve Fleet, though she remained in service for training operations. The next day, she moved to her namesake city to participate in Columbia Day, during which the ship was open to public tours. She thereafter embarked on a cruise that took her as far south as Bermuda in the Caribbean, and as far north as Canada. During this period, she stopped in New York; Casco Bay, Maine; Halifax, Nova Scotia; and various ports in Quebec and Ontario, Canada. She arrived back in Philadelphia on 28 June.

Columbia was initially kept in commission after she was placed in reserve on 30 October, stationed in Philadelphia. On 30 November, she was decommissioned before being formally allocated to the Atlantic Reserve Fleet on 7 February 1947. She remained in the Navy's inventory until early 1959. She was sold to the Boston Metals Company on 18 February 1959, though she was not actually stricken from the Naval Vessel Register until 1 March. She was thereafter towed to the breaker's yard to be broken up between November and December that year.
