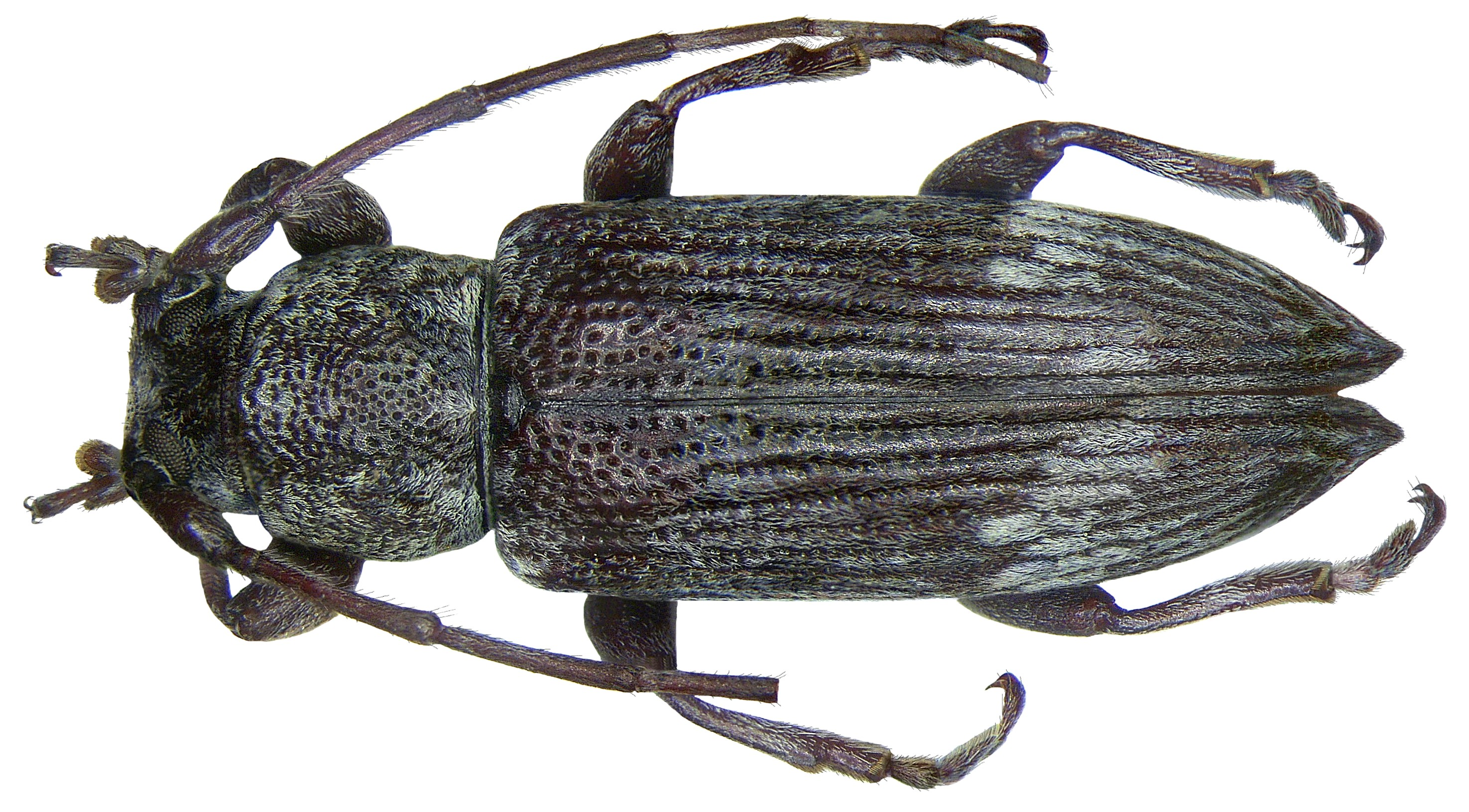

Scientific classification
- Kingdom: Animalia
- Phylum: Arthropoda
- Class: Insecta
- Order: Coleoptera
- Suborder: Polyphaga
- Infraorder: Cucujiformia
- Family: Cerambycidae
- Genus: Sybra
- Species: S. striatopunctata

Binomial name
- Sybra striatopunctata Breuning, 1939

= Sybra striatopunctata =

Species of beetle

Sybra striatopunctata is a species of beetle in the family Cerambycidae. It was described by Stephan von Breuning in 1939.

It's 7–11 mm long and 2.7-3.5 mm wide, and its type locality is Fauro Island, Solomon Islands.
