= Mbasakana =

Island in Solomon Islands

Coordinates: 8.311°S 160.582°E

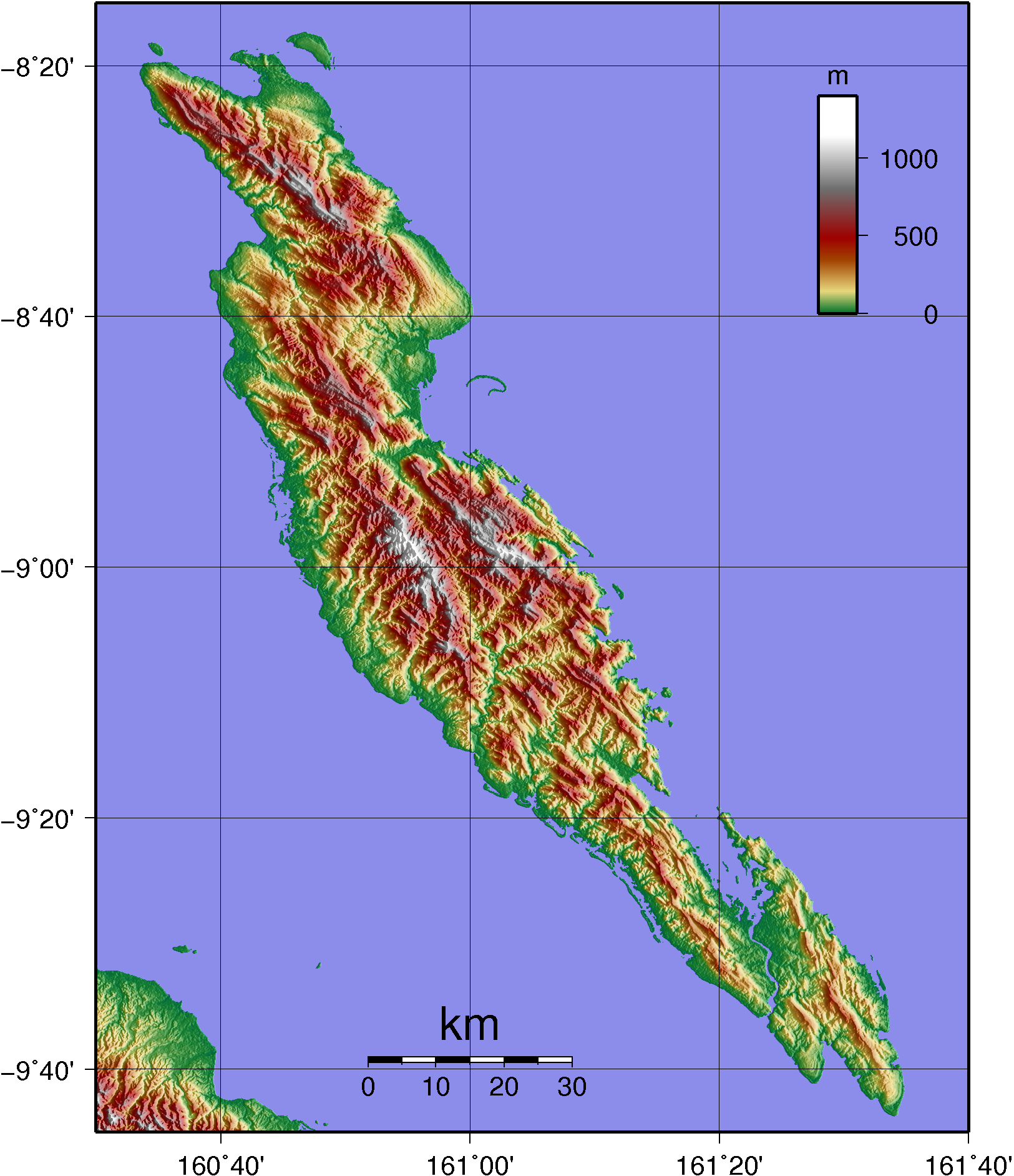
Mbasakana is located off the northwest coast of Malaita Island

Mbasakana is an island in Malaita Province, Solomon Islands.
