= USS Montpelier (CL-57) =

Light cruiser of the United States Navy

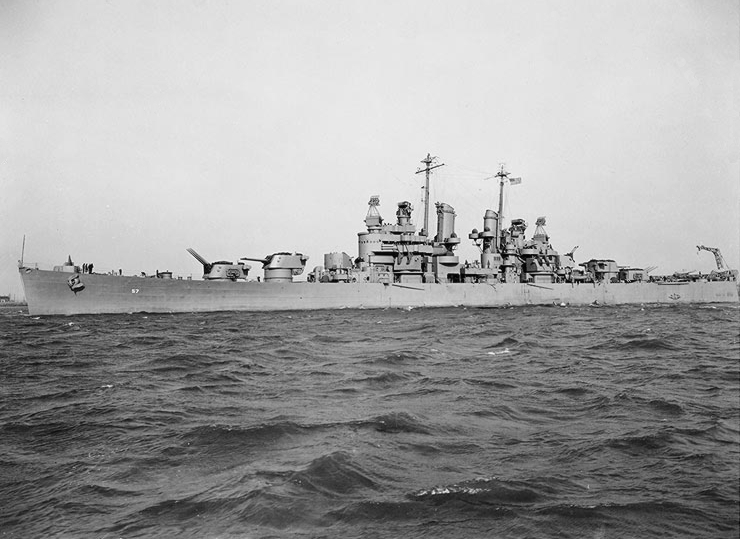
- USS Montpelier (CL-57) in Dec 1942

History

United States
- Name: Montpelier
- Namesake: City of Montpelier, Vermont
- Builder: New York Shipbuilding Corporation, Camden, New Jersey
- Laid down: 2 December 1940
- Launched: 12 February 1942
- Sponsored by: Mrs. William F. Carry
- Commissioned: 9 September 1942
- Decommissioned: 24 January 1947
- Stricken: 1 March 1959
- Identification: Hull symbol:CL-57; Code letters:NCFV
- Motto: "Mighty Monty"; "Legend of the Solomons"
- Honors and awards: 13 × Battle stars
- Fate: Scrapped in 1960

General characteristics
- Class & type: Cleveland-class Light cruiser
- Displacement: 11,744 long tons (11,932 t) (standard); 14,131 long tons (14,358 t) (max)
- Length: 610 ft 1 in (185.95 m) oa; 608 ft (185 m)pp
- Beam: 66 ft 4 in (20.22 m)
- Draft: 25 ft 6 in (7.77 m) (mean); 25 ft (7.6 m) (max)
- Installed power: 4 × 634 psi Steam boilers; 100,000 shp (75,000 kW)
- Propulsion: 4 × geared turbines; 4 × screws
- Speed: 32.5 kn (37.4 mph; 60.2 km/h)
- Range: 11,000 nmi (20,000 km) @ 15 kn (17 mph; 28 km/h)
- Complement: 1,255 officers and enlisted
- Armament: 4 × triple 6 in (150 mm)/47 caliber Mark 16 guns; 6 × dual 5 in (130 mm)/38 caliber anti-aircraft guns; 4 × quad 40 mm (1.6 in) Bofors anti-aircraft guns; 4 × dual 40 mm (1.6 in) Bofors anti-aircraft guns; 17 × single 20 mm (0.79 in) Oerlikon anti-aircraft cannons
- Armor: Belt: 3 1/2–5 in (89–127 mm); Deck: 2 in (51 mm); Barbettes: 6 in (150 mm); Turrets: 1 1/2–6 in (38–152 mm); Conning Tower: 2 1/4–5 in (57–127 mm)
- Aircraft carried: 4 × floatplanes
- Aviation facilities: 2 × stern catapults

Service record
- Operations: World War II
- Awards: 13 × Battle stars

USS Montpelier (hull number: CL-57) was one of 27 United States Navy Cleveland-class light cruisers completed during or shortly after World War II. She was the second US Navy ship to be named for the city of Montpelier, Vermont. Montpelier was commissioned in September 1942 and saw service in several campaigns in the Pacific. Like almost all her sister ships, she was decommissioned shortly after the end of the war, and never saw active service again. Montpelier was scrapped in the early 1960s.

== Construction ==
Montpelier was laid down on 2 December 1940 by New York Shipbuilding Corp., Camden, New Jersey; launched on 12 February 1942; sponsored by Mrs. Lesley Sayer Corry, wife of William F. Corry, mayor of Montpelier, Vermont; and commissioned on 9 September 1942, Captain Leighton Wood in command.

== Service history ==
=== World War II ===
Montpelier arrived in Nouméa, New Caledonia on 18 January 1943 from Norfolk, Virginia Rear Admiral A. S. Merrill chose her for the flagship of Cruiser Division 12 (CruDiv 12). On 25 January, she reached Efate, New Hebrides, her home base for the next few months. While making a sweep around beleaguered Guadalcanal, she participated in the Battle of Rennell Island on 29 January, the last naval engagement of the Guadalcanal campaign.

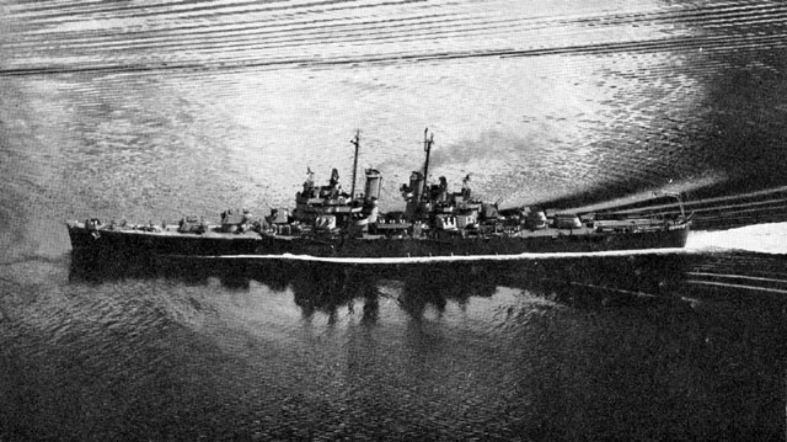
USS Montpelier before her 1944 refit.

Montpelier covered the landings on the Russell Islands on 21 February. On the night of 5–6 March, she heavily bombarded the Vila‑Stanmore airfield on Kolombangara in the Solomons, and helped sink an enemy destroyer in the Battle of Blackett Strait. She and three other cruisers bombarded Poporang Island (in the Shortland Islands) on the night of 29–30 June, in preparation for the invasion of New Georgia. On the night of 11–12 July, she bombarded fortifications on Munda, enabling troops to continue their conquest of New Georgia. She patrolled the New Georgia area for the next four months to prevent Japanese troop withdrawals.

After a voyage to Sydney, Australia, she joined Task Force 39 (TF 39) as its flagship for the invasion of the Treasury and Bougainville Islands. On 1 November, Montpelier shelled the Buka‑Bonis airfields on the northern tip of Bougainville, and hit the Japanese defenses on the islands of Poporang and Balalae, in the Shortlands. TF 39, consisting of cruisers and destroyers, engaged a superior Japanese force in the Battle of Empress Augusta Bay while guarding transports on the night of 2 November. The result was a victory for the U.S. ships commanded by Admiral Merrill. The victory turned back the Japanese from what would have been a disastrous assault on the Bougainville landing forces. Besides assisting in the destruction of one ship, Montpelier's gunners shot down five enemy planes.

From 15–19 February 1944, Montpelier covered the amphibious landing on the Green Islands in the Bismarck Archipelago. In March, she hunted shipping south of Truk and participated in the invasion of the Emiraus. On 20 May 1944, Montpelier received light damage from return fire when she and two other light cruisers, along with eight destroyers, bombarded shore installations on Shortland, Poporang, and Magusaiai islands in the Shortlands. On 1 October 1944, the US Navy's Special Air Task Force (SATFOR), began shelling Saipan on 14 June to support the Mariana Islands invasion. She joined TF 58 and participated in the decisive Battle of the Philippine Sea from 19–21 June. During the engagement, Japanese carrier air groups were virtually annihilated. Montpelier returned to the Marianas, and continued her shelling of Saipan, Tinian, and Guam. She left the Marianas on 2 August for overhauling in the United States.

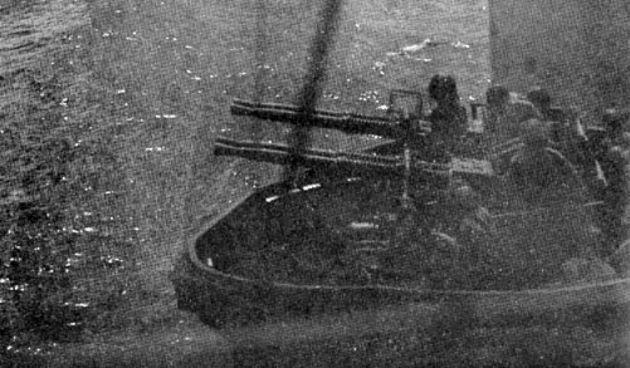
Starboard 40 mm gun

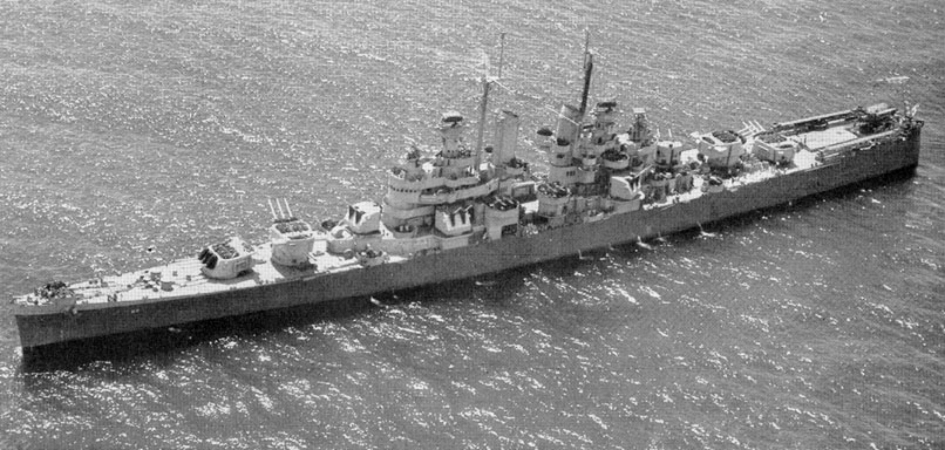
Aerial view of Montpelier in 1945

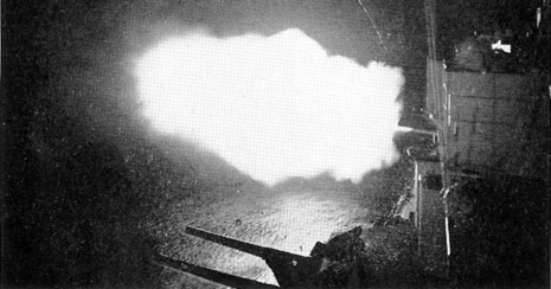
Montpelier's main batteries firing during the Battle of Empress Augusta Bay

Returning on 25 November, she joined a task group off Leyte Gulf. While steaming on defensive patrol off the Gulf, Montpelier was slightly damaged by a kamikaze attack on 27 November. She fought off numerous other kamikaze attacks, shooting down four planes.

Beginning on 12 December, Montpelier provided beach cover for the invasion of Mindoro. Fighting kamikazes, she protected troops at the Lingayen Gulf landing in January 1945. In February, she supported operations off Mariveles Harbor, Corregidor, and Palawan, and from 14–23 April, she covered the landings on Mindanao. From her base at Subic Bay, she steamed to Brunei Bay, Borneo, arriving on 9 June. From 17 June to 2 July, she sailed off the oil center at Balikpapan, providing support for minesweepers, underwater demolition teams, and amphibious forces. During the latter part of July and early August, Montpelier made three anti-shipping sweeps in the East China Sea as part of Task Force 95.

=== Post-War ===
When hostilities ended, she anchored off Wakayama, Japan, and helped accelerate the evacuation of Allied prisoners. After an inspection of Japanese ships, part of her crew went ashore to view the ruins of Hiroshima. On 18 October she covered the landing of occupation forces at Matsuyama. Montpelier departed from Hiro Wan and Japanese waters on 15 November for the East Coast, having battled the enemy from their deepest point of advance to their very homeland. From the Pacific, Montpelier sailed first for Hawaii, then to San Diego, California, before heading south to pass through the Panama Canal, with her final destination being New York City.

She reported for duty with the Atlantic Fleet on 11 December, and on 1 July 1946 reported for duty with the 16th Fleet. Montpelier decommissioned and berthed in reserve at Philadelphia on 24 January 1947. She was struck from the Naval Register on 1 March 1959, and was sold for scrap to Bethlehem Steel Co. 22 January 1960.

== Awards ==
Montpelier received 13 battle stars for World War II service, as well as the Navy Unit Commendation ribbon for outstanding heroism in action against enemy Japanese combatant ships on the night of 1–2 November 1943, the Battle of Empress Augusta Bay, as a member of Cruiser Division Twelve.

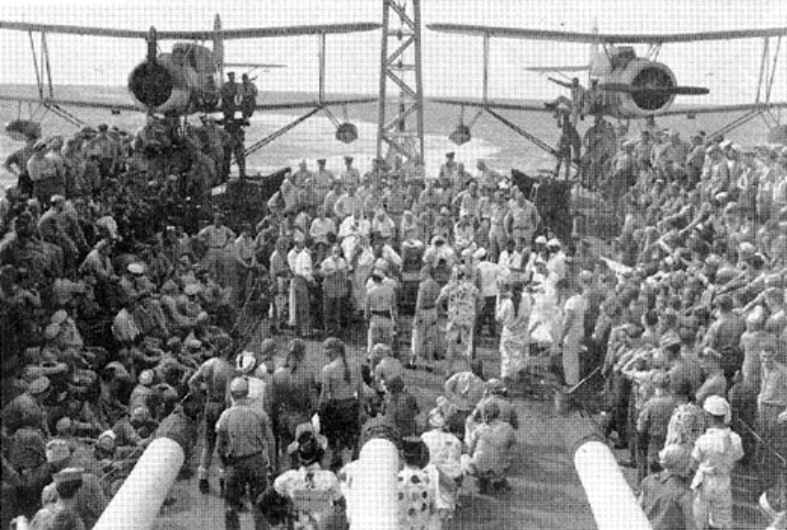
Curtis SOC-1 Scout-Observation Planes during Line-crossing ceremony on aft of the Montpelier

== Coat of arms ==
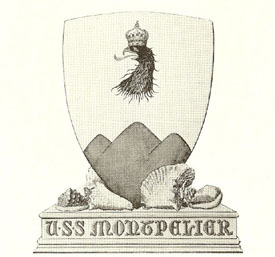
Shield of Montpelier

Depicted:

- The Green Mountains, principal topographical feature of Vermont, for whose capital Montpelier was named.
- A crowned eagle, replica of the crest of the Empress Augusta, wife of Germany's William I, after which Empress Augusta Bay was named. Montpelier, as Flagship of Task Force 39, played the principal role in the defeat of the Japanese in the Battle of Empress Augusta Bay.
- On fringe are coral cockershells, representative of the vast expanse of the Pacific, main theater in which Montpelier operated.

== Life on Montpelier ==
Decades after the war, James J. Fahey (1918–1991), Seaman First Class, published Pacific War Diary: 1942 - 1945, The Secret Diary of an American Sailor. The diary provides a first person account of the experience of a sailor on Montpelier throughout the war, from its first cruise from port to its final journey home. In general, keeping a diary was against Navy regulations. Thus, Fahey offered a rare view of life on Montpelier and on wartime naval life as well.

== Gallery of Montpelier photographs ==
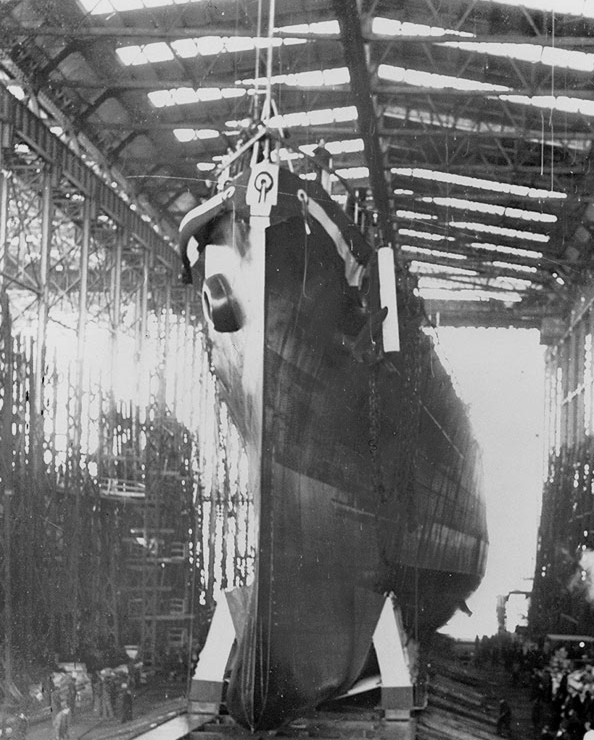
Montpelier at launch.

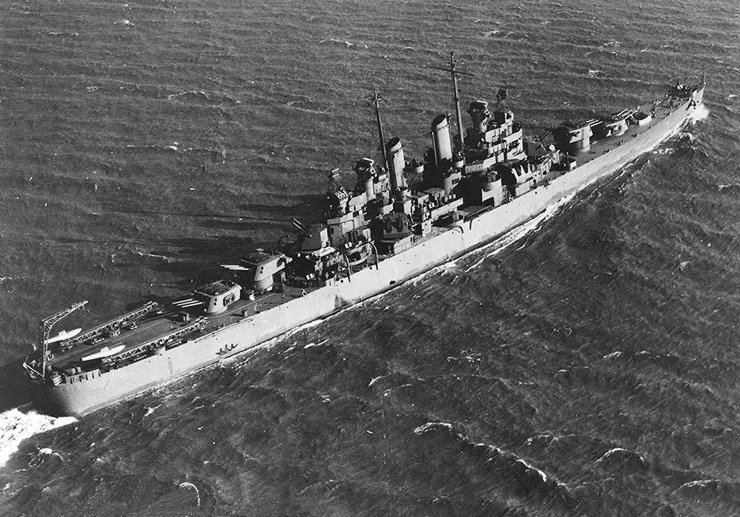
Montpelier test runs near Philadelphia.

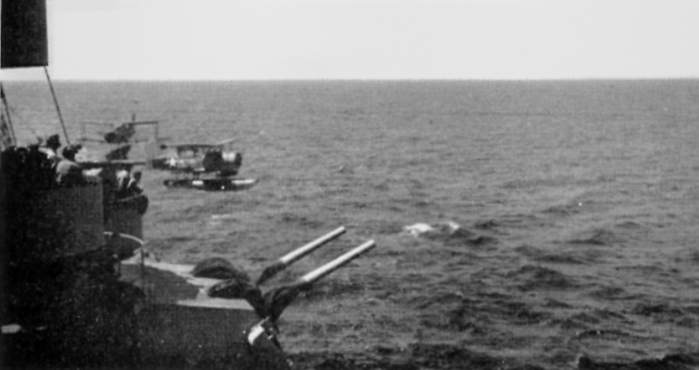
An SOC Seagull is catapulted off Montpelier.

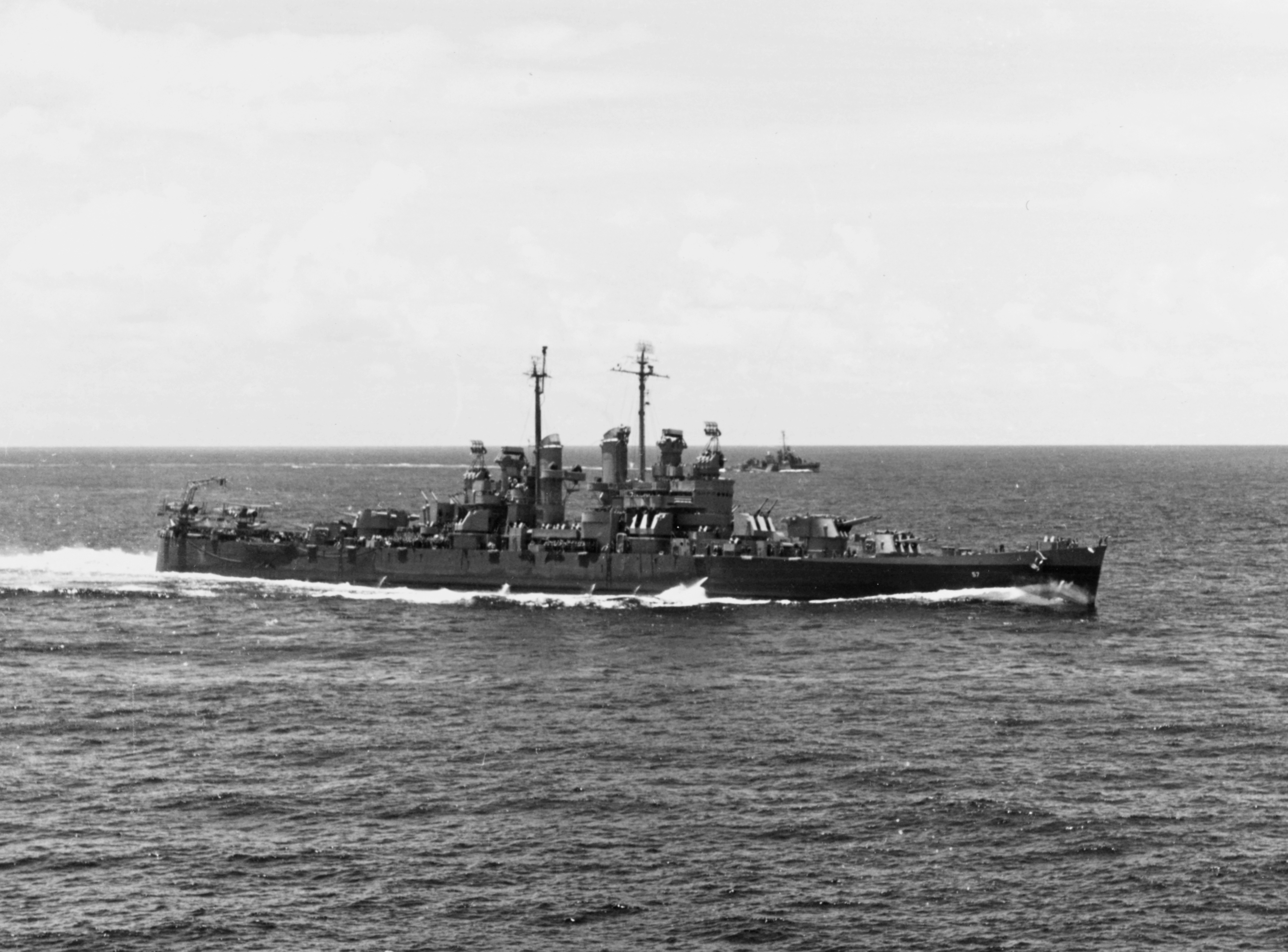
Montpelier underway in June 1944.

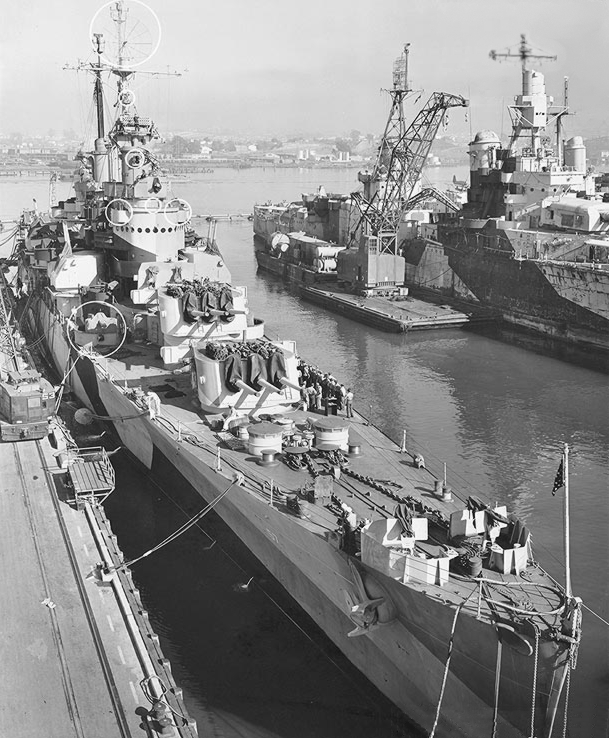
Montpelier moored at Mare Island Navy Yard, California.

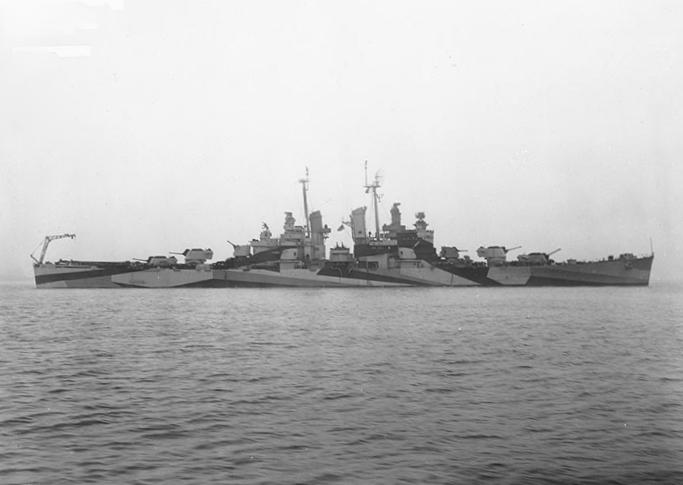
Montpelier wearing Camouflage Measure 32, Design 11a.
