= Mborokua =

Island in Western Province, Solomon Islands

Nickname: Mary Island
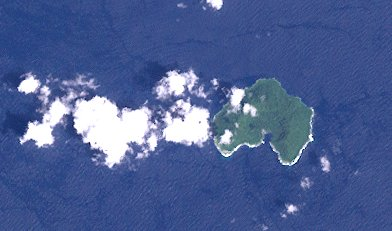
- Landsat image of Mborokua Island, Solomon islands

Geography
- Coordinates: 9°01′S 158°44′E
- Area: 4 km^{2} (1.5 sq mi)

Administration
- Solomon Islands
- Province: Western

Demographics
- Population: 0

Mborokua (also known as Mary Island) is an uninhabited, jungle-covered volcanic island in Western Province, Solomon Islands, 30 km west of the Russell Islands. It is occasionally visited by local fishermen, as well as by dive tours.

== See also ==
- Desert island
- List of islands of Solomon Islands
