= Masamasa =

Island in Solomon Islands

Coordinates: 6°48′S 156°8′E

Masamasa is an island of the Shortland Islands Archipelago, located in the Western Province of Solomon Islands in the Pacific Ocean. The estimated terrain elevation above sea level is some 97 meters. To the east lies Fauro Island, to the south lies Piedu Island (Piru), and to the east lies the northern tip of Choiseul Island.

== Wartime history ==
The island was occupied by the Japanese during early 1942 until the middle of September 1945. During late September and October 1945 Masamasa was used as an internment area for Japanese prisoners of war until they were repatriated.
