= Faisi =

Island in Solomon Islands

Coordinates: 7°4′20″S 155°52′10″E

Faisi is a small island in the Western Province of Solomon Islands. The island is a part of the Shortland Islands archipelago.

== Geography ==
Faisi is located near Shortland Island and lies 18 miles northeast of the Treasury Islands. The island is of rectangular shape and measures 1.3 km long and 350 m wide, and does not rise much above sea level. The estimated terrain elevation above sea level is some 26 metres.

== History ==
Germany claimed Faisi Island and kept it within German New Guinea but never developed the island. In 1899, along with the north of the Solomon Archipelago down as far as Isabel Island, Faisi was transferred to the British Solomon Islands Protectorate.

On June 7, 1895, Nicholas Tindal purchased the island from the German New Guinea Company for 600 Reichsmark as a wedding gift to his wife, Minnie Thursa Louise McDonald, whom he married that year. The couple established a trade store on the island and developed a freehold plantation there (1899–1903). They also built a family home on the southern tip of the island, as well as a trade store and copra-drying facility. They had two children born on the island, and it is likely these were the first Europeans born in the Shortlands. Later, the family mortgaged their plantations to Burns Philp & Co. that further developed Faisi Island into a trading post and build quarters for plantation workers along the eastern coast. When Nicholas Tindal died on his journey to Sydney on January 4, 1901, the company paid off the family's debts and completely acquired Faisi Island for 1,000 pounds on December 31, 1906. In those years the island already possessed a mature and productive copra plantations and had an excellent harbor and anchorage area. The company also improved a dock.

== World War II ==
The former Tindal family home and other buildings continued to be used as a trading store until the start of the Pacific War in early 1942. At the start of the war, the British government ordered all European inhabitants to be evacuated by boat from the Solomon Islands. Faisi Island was first island in the Solomons which was occupied by Japanese forces. Faisi became the headquarters for the Japanese 8th Fleet, and some five thousand soldiers were garrisoned there. The Allies considered invading in August 1943 but chose instead to bypass the Shortlands for Bougainville and the Treasury Islands, so the Japanese controlled the Shortland Islands until the war's end. After the war, the Shortland Islands were re-established as a leading copra producing area. Today, the Faisi Island is uninhabited.
