= Magusaiai =

Island in Solomon Islands

Coordinates: 7°06′S 155°49′E

Magusaiai is an island in the Shortland Islands archipelago, in Western Province, in the independent nation of Solomon Islands. The estimated terrain elevation above sea level is some 14 metres.

== Village ==
Maleai village is the largest village on the eastern tip of Magusaiai Island. To the east lies Tuha Channel, between Poporang Island and Shortland Island. A pre-war Catholic mission church was built at this location. The area around the village was the site of the ceramic production.

== Wartime history ==
On March 30, 1942, the island was occupied by the Japanese when they took over the Shortland Islands. The island remained occupied until the official surrender of Japan in September 1945. From November 30 to December 17, 1943, the island was a target for American air missions.
