= Ovau Island =

Island in Solomon Islands

Coordinates: 6°47′S 156°0′E

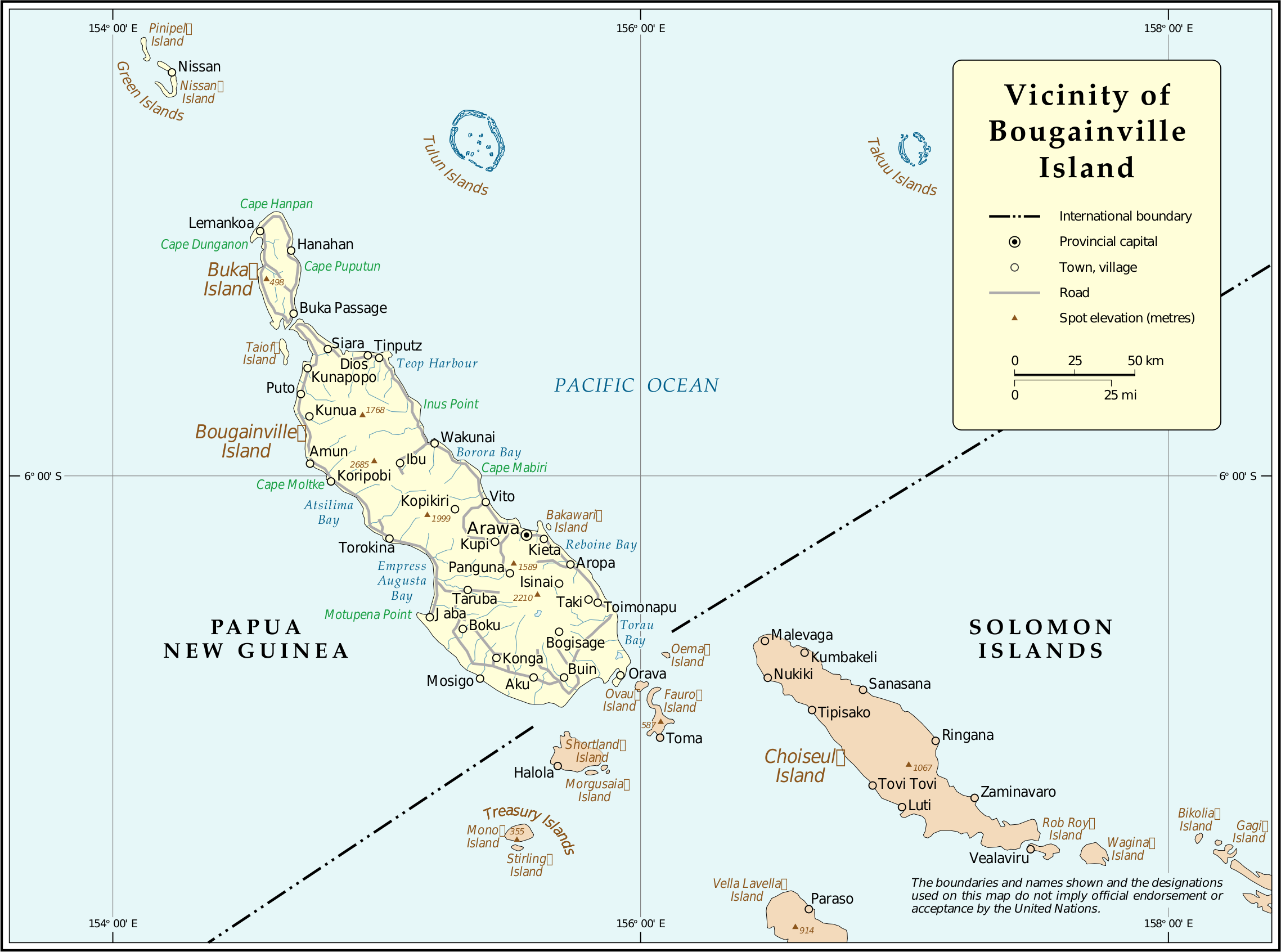
Ovau Island is to the south of Bougainville Island

Ovau Island is an island of the Shortland Islands archipelago in Western Province, Solomon Islands, lying south of Bougainville Island. The estimated terrain elevation above sea level is some 309 metres.
