= Pirumeri Island =

Island in Solomon Islands

Coordinates: 7°06′S 155°53′E

Pirumeri Island is an island of the Shortland Islands archipelago, in Western Province, in the independent nation of Solomon Islands. The estimated terrain elevation above sea level is some 25 metres.
