= Shortland Islands =

Island group of Western Province, Solomon Islands

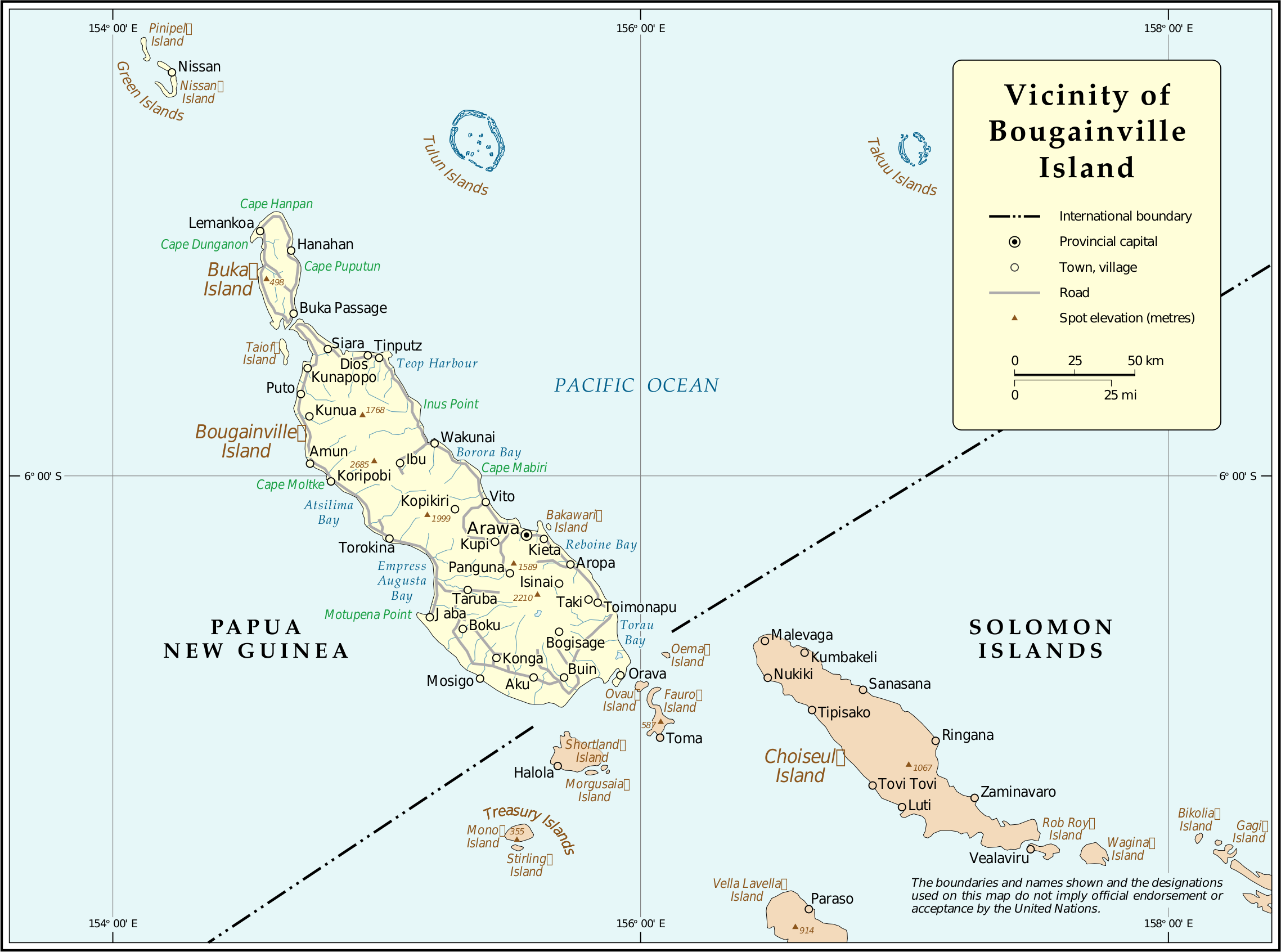
Map showing the Shortland Archipelago to the south of Bougainville Island

The Shortland Islands is an archipelago of Western Province, Solomon Islands, at 6.92°S 155.88°E. The island group lies in the extreme north-west of the country's territory, close to the south-east edge of Bougainville Island, Papua New Guinea.

The largest island in the archipelago is Shortland Island (originally called Alu). With smaller offshore islands such as Gharomai (to the southwest), Balalae (to the northeast) and Magusaiai, Faisi, Pirumeri and Poporang (all to the southeast), it forms the Inner Shortlands Ward of the Western Province. The remaining islands comprise the Outer Shortlands Ward and consist of two groups; the Treasury Islands to the southwest of Shortland Island consists mainly of Mono Island and the smaller Stirling Island; the other group, which lies to the northeast of Shortland Island, consists of Fauro Island and smaller islands grouped around it - including Masamasa and Piru Islands to the east, Rohae Island to the south, Mania Island to the southwest, Asie Island to the west, Ovau Island to the northwest and Oema Island to the north.

== Early European involvement ==
The island group, and the largest island, were named by Royal Navy officer John Shortland in 1788. Shortland was the naval commander of a 1777–79 voyage by the First Fleet to establish a penal colony at Botany Bay, Australia.

Germany later claimed the islands and owned them as part of the North Solomon Islands Protectorate until 1900.

== World War II ==
On March 30, 1942, Japanese war ships entered Shortland Harbor and landed two special naval landing force platoons and met no resistance. One platoon remained in the area to begin establishing Shortland Harbor Seaplane Base. They established the base, seaplane moorings and fortifications in Tuha Channel and the adjoining land on the southeastern portion of Shortland Island, on Faisi and on the northern portion of Poporang.

On the night of 29–30 June 1943, USS Montpelier (CL-57) and three other cruisers bombarded Poporang Island in preparation for the invasion of New Georgia. The Allies considered invading the seaplane base in August 1943, but chose instead to bypass the Shortlands for Bougainville and the Treasury Islands, leaving the Shortlands under Japanese control until the war's end. On 1 November 1943, Montpelier shelled the Japanese defenses on Poporang and Balalae.

On 8 January 1944, an Allied force of two light cruisers and five destroyers bombarded the installations on Faisi, Poporang, and Shortland Island. In March 1944, planes from the USAAF's 70th Fighter Squadron used reconnaissance photographs taken by the 17th Reconnaissance Squadron to strike the seaplane base, claiming eight float planes and an IJN destroyer. On 20 May 1944, Montpelier received light damage from return fire when she and two other light cruisers, along with eight destroyers, bombarded shore installations on Shortland, Poporang, and Magusaiai Islands. On 1 October 1944, the US Navy's Special Air Task Force (SATFOR) launched four TDR drones on antiaircraft gun positions on Poporang and Balalae.

== Gallery ==
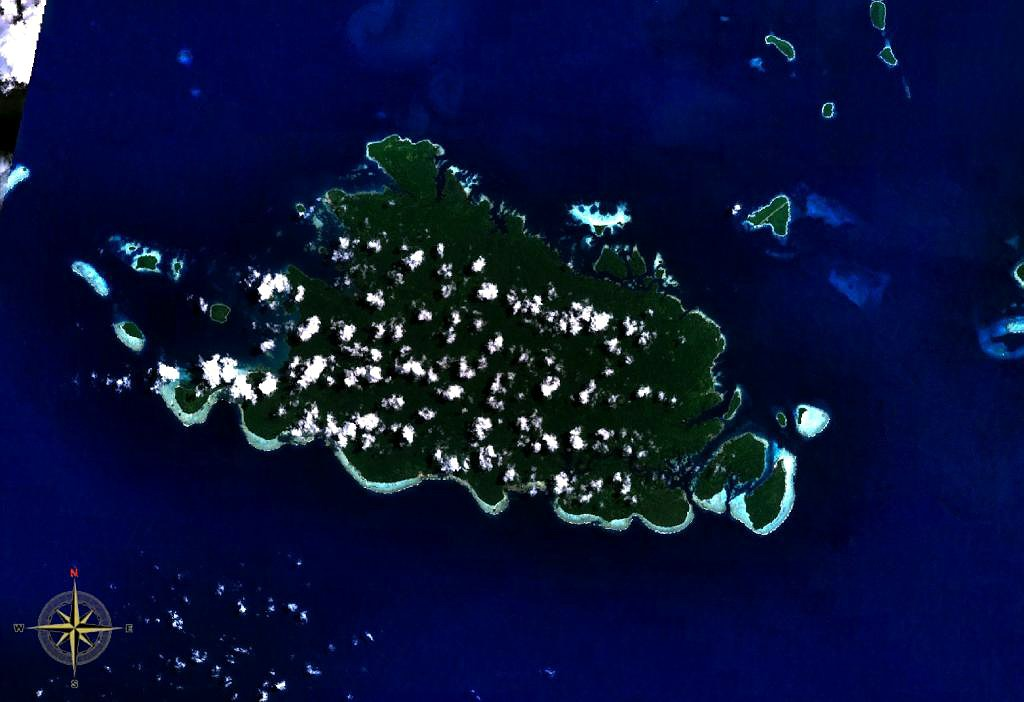
NASA Satellite Imagery of Shortland Island

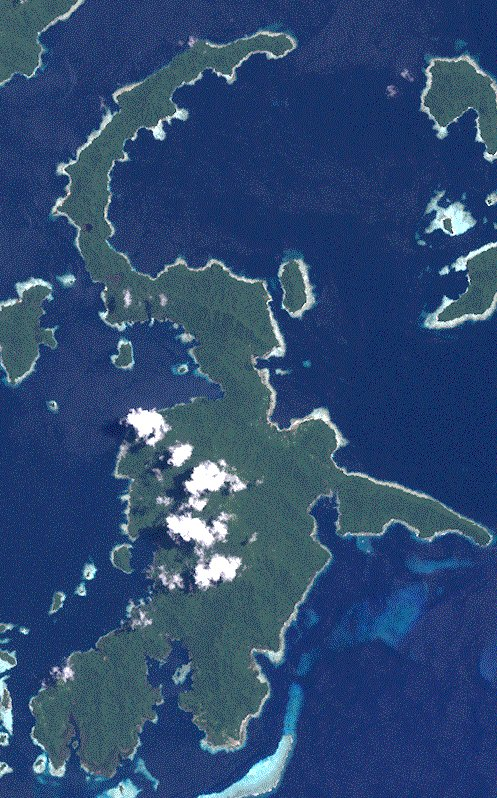
Fauro Island

== See also ==
- Shortlands constituency
