= Fauro Island =

Island in Solomon Islands

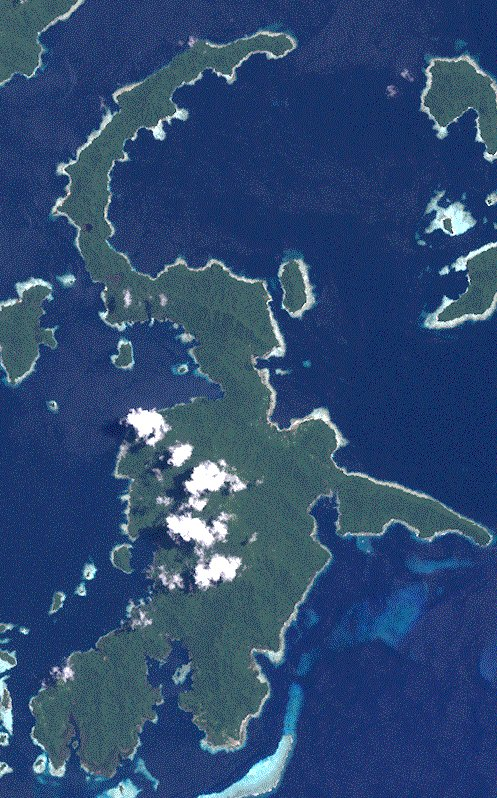
Satellite image of Fauro Island

Fauro Island is an island of the Shortland Islands archipelago in Western Province, Solomon Islands, located to the south of Bougainville Island at 6°55′S 156°4′E. Along the center spine of the island are Mount Pauboleala with an elevation of 574 metres, Mount Lalauka with an elevation of 517 m, and Sharp Peak with an elevation of 484 m.

== Wartime history ==
During early 1942 the island was occupied by the Japanese until the formal surrender of Japan on September 2, 1945. During November 1945 Fauro was occupied by the Australian Army that established Kareki prisoners of war camp until the Japanese were repatriated in 1946.
