= Shortland Island =

Island in Solomon Islands

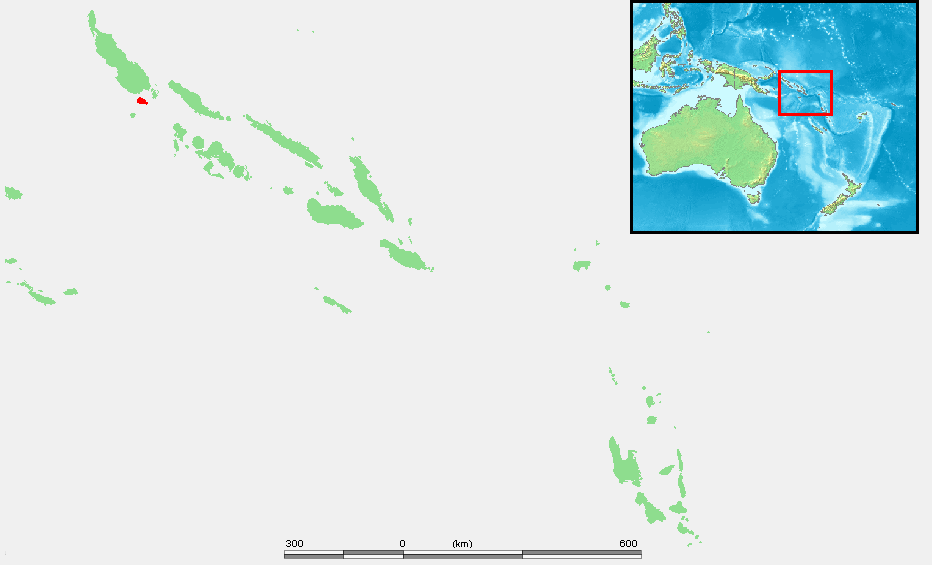
Shortland Island

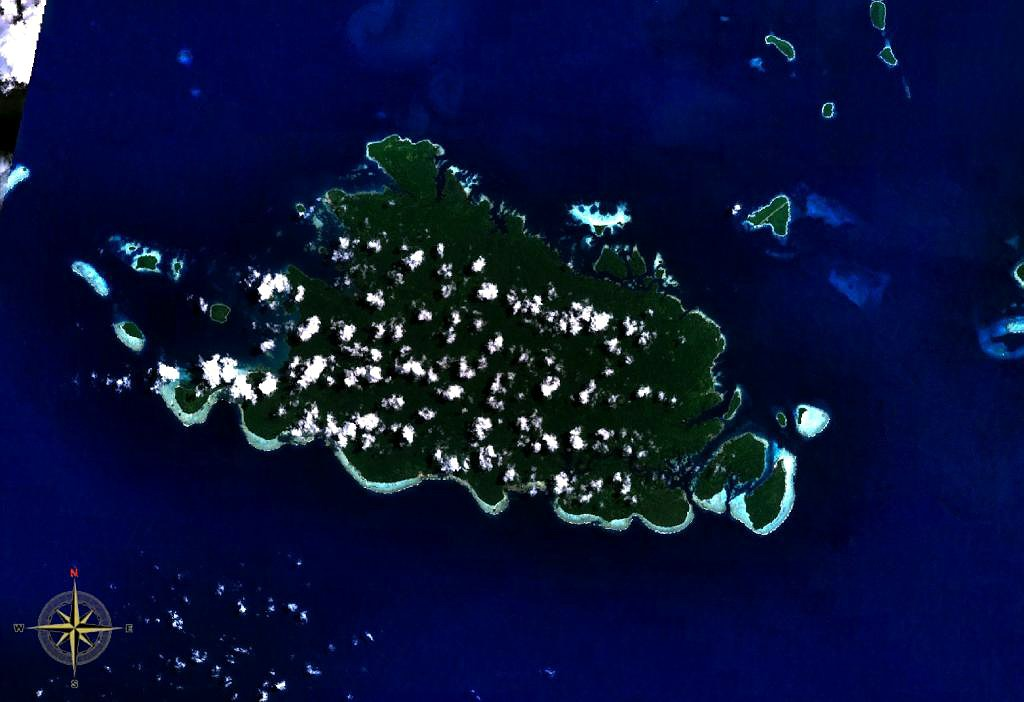
Satellite image of Shortland Island in the Shortland Islands archipelago

Shortland Island (once known as Alu) is the largest island of the Shortland Islands archipelago, in the Western Province of Solomon Islands, at 7°3′S 155°45′E.

The original name was a Melanesian word, while the current name was given to the island by Royal Navy officer John Shortland in 1788. Shortland was the naval commander of a 1777–79 voyage by the First Fleet to establish a penal colony at Botany Bay, Australia.

== World War II ==
On March 30, 1942, war ships of the Imperial Japanese Navy entered Shortland Harbour and landed two special naval landing force platoons and met no resistance. One platoon remained in the area to begin establishing Shortland Harbour Seaplane Base.

The Allies considered invading the seaplane base in August 1943, but chose instead to bypass the Shortlands for Bougainville Island and the Treasury Islands, leaving the Shortlands under Japanese control until the war's end.

On January 8, 1944, an Allied force of two light cruisers and five destroyers bombarded the installations on Shortland Island. In March 1944, planes from the USAAF's 70th Fighter Squadron used reconnaissance photographs taken by the 17th Reconnaissance Squadron to strike the seaplane base, claiming eight float planes and an IJN destroyer, presumably the IJN Hatsuyuki, although the ship had been sunk in an earlier USAAF raid on July 17, 1943. On 20 May 1944, USS Montpelier (CL-57) received light damage from return fire when she and two other light cruisers, along with eight destroyers, bombarded shore installations on Shortland.
