= Kwaisulia =

- Born: early 1850s Sulufou, Solomon Islands
- Died: 1909
- Height: 177 cm (5 ft 10 in)

Kwaisulia (early 1850s – 1909) was a prominent tradesman, strongman and blackbirder on the island of Malaita in the late nineteenth century, who for several decades held political control over the north of the island.

Born on the island of Sulufou in the Lau Lagoon, Kwaisulia was exposed to Europeans through his friendship with the marooned Scotsman Jack Renton. Not being a member of any traditionally prominent families on the island, Kwaisulia began his rise to prominence by enlisting as a labourer in the Queensland sugar cane industry during the 1870s. Upon his return to Malaita he asserted himself as a leading recruiter of labour for the Queensland sugar cane farms, a role which included blackbirding. Becoming an intermediary between the people of the Lau Lagoon and European traders, Kwaisulia controlled trade between Malaita and the rest of the world, acquiring significant wealth and power as a result. Dying in 1909, Kwaisulia left behind numerous issue, and has a controversial legacy.

== Early life ==
Kwaisulia was born on the island of Sulufou, the most heavily populated of the several islands located within the Lau Lagoon, at some point in the early 1850s. Kwaisulia's father hailed from the interior of Malaita, and was not of a high rank in society, while his mother was a member of the family who were the chiefs of Sulufou. In this way, Kwaisulia was often close to prestigious individuals who had substantial amounts of power, but was of a low status himself. Kwaisulia's father was in addition a prominent warrior who settled on the small islet of Adagege after it was conquered by the chief of Sulufou, beginning Kwaisulia's association with that island.

== Career ==
=== Jack Renton and Queensland ===
Prior to his ascension to prominence, Kwaisulia was a ramo, or warrior, which granted him some prestige. In 1868, Scottish sailor Jack Renton arrived on Sulufou, as a slave of a bigman and chieftain named Kabbou. He and Kwaisulia soon became close friends, with Kwaisulia learning a limited amount of English from Renton. Renton was rescued in 1875, and later that year returned aboard the brigantine Bobtail Nag and convinced Kwaisulia to leave and work in Queensland for six years. Alternatively, historian Deryck Scarr states that Kwaisulia accompanied Renton when he was rescued, though he agrees that Kwaisulia spent six years in Queensland. It is not known where specifically in Queensland Kwaisulia worked, though historian Clive Moore suggests that it may have been in the area around Rockhampton. It is known that he visited the city of Brisbane, apparently being impressed by its size.

=== Growing influence ===
Kwaisulia returned from Queensland in 1881. Upon his return, he took up a role as a passage master in the "recruitment" trade, encouraging people to work on farms in Queensland, and in return received weapons and supplies from European traders. Kwaisulia's extensive knowledge of Pidgin English and European customs made him ideally suited for the role of intermediary between the peoples of the Lau Lagoon and the Europeans. He increased his power by assuming the duties of several traditionally separate roles; such as involving himself in the arranging of marriages, taking command of hunting parties, and procuring human sacrifices. In his position, Kwaisulia often coerced or forced people to join up with the recruiters, thus engaging in a form of blackbirding.

Kwaisulia began to cultivate an image among the people of the Lau Lagoon as an ally of the British Empire, and his wealth and growing prestige allowed him to gain a large following. Anthropologist Roger Keesing states that it is believed that the Europeans thought that Kwaisulia was a traditional chief, when in actuality his power and influence largely came through his good relations with the British. Kwaisulia's main power base was the island of Adagege, which he fortified with barbed wire. His influence increased considerably when Kabbou died in 1886, thus altering the local balance of power. Emboldened, Kwaisulia led an attack on the island of Funaafou, the traditional enemy of Sulufou, and successfully conquered it, installing his eldest son Jackson Kaiviti as a vassal chief. His physical presence at the assault and his installation of relatives as vassals were both violations of Melanesian tradition, and according to author Nigel Randell Evans represented a turn by Kwaisulia towards European-style state building.

By 1897 Kwaisulia was the most powerful figure in northern Malaita. At the height of his power it was said by his contemporaries that he could field a force of 1,000 fighters, and that he held influence as far south as the Maramasike Passage. This level of authority was unprecedented in Malaita, and the resulting stability made the areas under Kwaisulia's control appealing to visitors. As such, Kwaisulia was able to control trade between Malaita and the rest of the world.

Despite his good relations with Europeans, Kwaisulia was a staunch opponent of Christianity, opposing attempts to spread the religion in the area. Originally, he actively opposed all missionary work in the region under his influence, but later in his life he allowed white missionaries such as Arthur Hopkins to preach, feeling that the prestige of having Europeans work under him was a satisfactory trade off for the potentially destabilising influence of Christianity.

=== Later life and death ===
As the British began to expand their influence further during the beginning of the 20th century, Kwaisulia's power began to wane somewhat, though he still commanded considerable influence. In 1903, Queensland banned foreign labourers from entering the state, which forced Kwaisulia to instead refocus his efforts on sending labourers to Fiji. Kwaisulia died in 1909, when, while hunting fish with dynamite, a cartridge he was holding "exploded in his face". After Kwaisulia's death, his followers accused a chieftain of Sulufou of killing him with sorcery, and as a result skirmishes broke out between them and the inhabitants of Sulufou.

== Legacy and character ==
Kwaisulia has a complicated legacy in his native Lau Lagoon, with him being remembered as an effective warrior and leader by some, but a tyrant by others. His reputation was also mixed among his contemporaries; mariner William T. Wawn describes him negatively while fellow mariner John Cromar describes him positively. Kwaisulia was survived by at least three sons, two of whom, Jackson Kaiviti and Timi Kakaluae, also rose to prominence, with Kaiviti becoming an advocate of Christianity and Kakaluae a chieftain and staunch opponent of the Maasina Rule movement.

=== Historiography ===
Kwaisulia was not paid much attention by early historians and ethnographers of Melanesia, a situation which was considered by anthropologist Stuart Kisch to be part of a larger occurrence where European academics had attempted to completely separate European influence from native Melanesian culture, thus excluding figures such as Kwaisulia whose historical influence is inseparable from the interactions between the two cultures. The primary work that increased the stature of Kwaisulia among western anthropologists was Roger Keesing's essay "Kwaisulia as culture hero", published in the 1992 book History and Tradition in Melanesian Anthropology.

== Bibliography ==
- Boutilier, Jim (1 July 1973). "Kwaisulia, Malaita big man". Pacific Islands Monthly. 44 (7). Pacific Publications: 61–63.
- Campbell, Ian Christopher (1989). A History of the Pacific Islands. University of California Press. ISBN 9780520069015.
- Corris, Peter (1973). "Kwaisulia of Ada Gege: A Strongman in the Solomon Islands". In James Wightman Davidson; Deryck Scarr (eds.). Pacific Islands Portraits. ANU Press. pp. 253–266. ISBN 978-0708101667.
- D'Arcy, Paul (1987). "Firearms on Malaita, 1870-1900" (PDF). Center for Pacific Islands Studies: 50–87. ISSN 0897-8905.
- Emmer, Piet C. (2012). "Colonialism and indentured labor migration in the western pacific 1840-1915". Colonialism and Migration; Indentured Labour Before and After Slavery. Springer Nature. ISBN 978-9024732531.
- Hobbis, Stephanie Ketterer (October 2016). "An Ethnographic Study of the State in Rural Solomon Islands: A Quest for Autonomy in Global Dependencies" (PDF). Concordia University.
- Keesing, Roger (1992). "Kwaisulia as Culture Hero". In James G. Carrier (ed.). History and Tradition in Melanesian Anthropology. University of California Press. ISBN 9780520075238.
- Kisch, Stuart (September 1994). "Book Reviews: History and Tradition in Melanesian Anthropology". Man. 28 (3). Royal Anthropological Institute: 760–761. doi:10.2307/2804405. JSTOR 2804405.
- Lal, Brij V.; Fortune, Kate (2000). The Pacific Islands: An Encyclopedia. Vol. 1. University of Hawaii Press. ISBN 9780824822651.
- Moore, Clive (1985). Kanaka: A History of Melanesian Mackay. Port Moresby: Institute of Papua New Guinea Studies and the University of Papua and New Guinea Press. ISBN 9980-68-000-8.
- Moore, Clive (2017). Making Mala: Malaita in Solomon Islands, 1870s–1930s. ANU Press. doi:10.22459/MM.04.2017. ISBN 9781760460976.
- Randell, Nigel (17 July 2003). The White Headhunter: The Story of a 19th-Century Sailor Who Survived a South Seas Heart of Darkness. Carroll & Graf. ISBN 0786712562.
- Scarr, Deryck (16 December 2013). A History of the Pacific Islands. Taylor & Francis. ISBN 9781136837968.
