= Adagege =

Island of Solomon Islands

Coordinates: 8°26′S 160°51′E

Adagege, alternatively spelled Ada Gege or Ada-gege, is an artificial island built on the reef in the Lau Lagoon on Malaita in Solomon Islands; it is located in Malaita Province. The road from Auki ends at Fouia wharf opposite the islands of Sulufou and Adaege in the Lau Lagoon.

== History ==
Originally settled by refugees from south of the Lau Lagoon, Adagage was taken over by the inhabitants of Sulufou and was converted into a specialised island for women to give birth at, later it was ritually cleansed and turned into a village. During the late 19th and early 20th century Adagege was the power base of Kwaisulia, a prominent strongman in the area who held influence across northern Malaita, during which time it was fortified with barbed wire.
