= 'Are'are =

ꞌAreꞌare or Are'are may refer to:

- ꞌAreꞌare people, an ethnic group in the Solomon Islands
- ꞌAreꞌare language, a language spoken in the Solomon Islands
- ꞌAreꞌare constituency, a parliamentary constituency in the Solomon Islands
