= Malaita dolphin drive hunt =

Dolphins are hunted in Malaita in the Solomon Islands in the South Pacific, mainly for their meat and teeth, and also sometimes for live capture for dolphinariums. Dolphin drive hunting is practised by coastal communities around the world; the animals are herded together with boats and then into a bay or onto a beach. A large-scale example is the Taiji dolphin drive hunt, made famous by the Oscar-winning documentary film The Cove. The hunt on South Malaita Island is smaller in scale. After capture, the meat is shared equally between households. Dolphin teeth are also used in jewelry and as currency on the island.

== Species and reasons ==
The dolphins are hunted in a similar fashion as in other drives, using stones instead of metal rods to produce sounds to scare and confuse the dolphins. The hunting season lasts roughly from December to April, when the dolphins are closest to shore. As in other countries, the dolphins are hunted for their meat for local consumption, and, as explained below, the Malaitans have experimented with live capture for export. One reason for the hunt that appears to be specific to the Solomon Islands, however, is the desirability attached to the teeth of certain species.

The dolphin teeth have a value in trade and in brideprice ceremonial traditions, funeral feasts and for compensation. The teeth of melon-headed whale were traditionally the most desirable, however hunting resulted in that dolphin species becoming rare in the ocean off Malaita. The other species hunted are spinner dolphin and the pantropical spotted dolphin. While Indo-Pacific bottlenose dolphin (Tursiops aduncus) have been captured for live export, their teeth are not considered to have any value.

== History and revival ==
According to Malaitian oral history, a Polynesian woman named Barafaifu introduced dolphin drive hunting to Malaita from Ontong Java Atoll. She settled in Fanalei village, as it was the place for hunting. Dolphin hunting ceased in the mid-19th century. The influence of Christian missionaries is thought to be the cause of the end to hunting.

However, in 1948 dolphin hunting was revived in Fanalei, and also Walande, located 10 km to the north, as well as at villages on Malaita, including Ata'a, Felasubua, Sulufou (in the Lau Lagoon) and at Mbita'ama harbour (North East Malaita). However, Fanalei in South Malaita remained the preeminent dolphin hunting village.

== Research and moratorium ==
The amount of dolphins killed each year was not known in 2008, but anecdotal information suggested between 600 and 1500 dolphins per hunting season.

The capture and trade of wild dolphins is prohibited in the Western Province of the Solomon Islands.

In April 2009 it was decided by CITES that an in-depth review of the commercial dolphin trade conducted from the Solomon Islands should take place, this after the IUCN Cetacean Specialist Group came to the conclusion that insufficient population data exists to prove the sustainability of the wild captures and the current export quota of 100 animals per year. The Solomon Island Dolphin Abundance Project was established to provide data on the size of the local Indo-Pacific Bottlenose population and the sustainability of the dolphin hunts. A report published in March 2013 as a result of this effort indicated that the capture of dolphins in the Solomon Islands can only be sustainable at a very low rate and that previous rates of capture as seen between 2003 and 2013 would not be sustainable in the future.

The Solomon Islands signed the Memorandum of Understanding (MoU) for the Conservation of Cetaceans and their Habitats in the Pacific Islands Region under the Convention on the Conservation of Migratory Species of Wild Animals in 2007, which is a commitment to improve conservation efforts, reduce threats and undertake research and monitoring of cetaceans and provide reports.

== Renewed hunting ==
In recent years only villages in South Malaita Island have continued to hunt dolphin. In 2010, the villages of Fanalei, Walende, and Bitamae signed a MoU with the non-governmental organization, Earth Island Institute, to stop hunting dolphin. However, in early 2013 the agreement broke down and some men in Fanalei resumed hunting. The hunting of dolphin continued in early 2014.

Researchers from the South Pacific Whale Research Consortium, the Solomon Islands Ministry of Fisheries and Marine Resources, and Oregon State University’s Marine Mammal Institute have concluded that hunters from the village of Fanalei killed more than 1,600 dolphins in 2013, included at least 1,500 pantropical spotted dolphins, 159 spinner dolphins and 15 bottlenose dolphins. The total number total number killed during the period 1976-2013 was more than 15,400. The price at which dolphin tooth are traded in Malaita rose from the equivalent of 18c in 2004 to about 90c in 2013.

== Live capture ==
Gordon Lilo, the prime minister of the Solomon Islands, announced in 2014 that he opposes export of live dolphins, but defends the traditional hunting of dolphin.

Some bottlenosed dolphins have been sold to the entertainment industry.

There was much controversy in July 2003, when 28 Indo-Pacific bottlenose dolphins (Tursiops trancatus aduncus) were exported to Parque Nizuc, a water park in Cancun. A large portion of the animals were later transported to Cozumel, to do interaction programs. Though the export of dolphins had been banned in 2005, the export of dolphins was resumed in October 2007 when the ban was lifted following a court decision, allowing for 28 dolphins to be sent to a dolphinarium in Dubai. A further three dolphins were found dead near the holding pens.

The dealer that exported these dolphins has stated that they intend to release their 17 remaining dolphins back into the wild in the future.

== Eco-tourism potential ==
Tourism minister Bartholomew Parapolo visited Bita'ama community in 2015 and offered to fund eco-tourism business project involving swimming with dolphins, if they ceased killing.
