= Kolovrat =

Kolovrat or Kolowrat may refer to:

== People ==
=== Families ===
- Kolowrat family, a Czech noble family

=== Individuals ===
- Evpaty Kolovrat (c.1200 – 1238), Russian knight
- Johann Kollowrat (1748–1816), Bohemian noble and Austrian field marshal
- Franz Anton von Kolowrat-Liebsteinsky (1778–1861), Bohemian noble and Austrian statesman
- Alexander Kolowrat (1886–1927), Bohemian noble and Austrian film producer
- Alois Josef Krakovský z Kolovrat (1759–1833), Roman Catholic archbishop of Prague
- Henry Kolowrat, Jr. (1933–2021), American fencer
- Samantha Kolowratová (born 1996), Czech ice hockey player

== Places ==
- Kolovrat (mountain ridge), on the border between Italy and Slovenia
- Mount Kolovrat or Kalourat, a mountain in the Malaita Island in Solomon Islands
- Kolovrat, Zagorje ob Savi, a settlement in the municipality of Zagorje ob Savi, Slovenia
- Kolovrat, Tuzla, a settlement in the municipality of Tuzla in Bosnia and Herzegovina
- Kolovrat, Prijepolje, a settlement and necropolis near today's Prijepolje, Serbia
- Kolowrat Theatre, a theatre in Prague, Czech Republic

== Other ==
- Kolovrat (symbol), a Slavic neopagan solar symbol
- Kolovrat (band), a Russian rock band
- Furious (2017 film), also known as Legend of Kolovrat, a Russian film
