= Arthur Hopkins (missionary) =

British missionary (1869–1943)

Arthur Innes Hopkins (1869 – 1943) was a British Anglican missionary active in the north of the island of Malaita.

== Early life ==
Hopkins was born in York to a devoutly Christian family. He was sickly as a child and suffered from numerous serious illnesses, but he nonetheless completed his education at several local schools. Hopkins was ordained as a deacon in 1892 and as a priest in 1893. He wished to work as a missionary, and applied to the Missionary Council for Service Abroad in 1900 in order to do so.

== Lau Lagoon ==
In 1903, Hopkins set up a missionary base in the Lau Lagoon under the orders of Charles Morris Woodford. He was sent to the Lau Lagoon in order to preempt the possibility of the Methodist Church setting up a mission in the area, as the Anglican colonial authorities did not wish for the Methodists to gain influence. After arriving at the mission he was placed under 24-hour guard, as the mission was under constant threat of attack from locals.

Hopkins became influential in the area, negotiating the setting up of missions with Malaitan leaders. He had strained relations with the most powerful leader in the area, Kwaisulia, but co-operated with him on crushing local outbreaks of violence. Hopkins translated the Bible into the Lau and Kwara'ae languages, and also conducted church services in those languages. He attempted to send copies of these translated religious materials to Pentecostal missionary Peter Ambuofa, but his efforts did not result in any significant conversions to Anglicanism in the area under Ambuofa's control.

== Later life ==
Hopkins left Malaita in 1915, heading to Norfolk Island and then to Maravovo. He later returned to the United Kingdom, becoming Secretary for the Melanesian Mission from 1926 to 1929. Hopkins died in 1943.
