= Oroha =

Oroha may refer to:

- Oroha people, a Melanesian people of the Solomon Islands
- Oroha language, the language of the Oroha people
