= Artificial island =

Island constructed by people

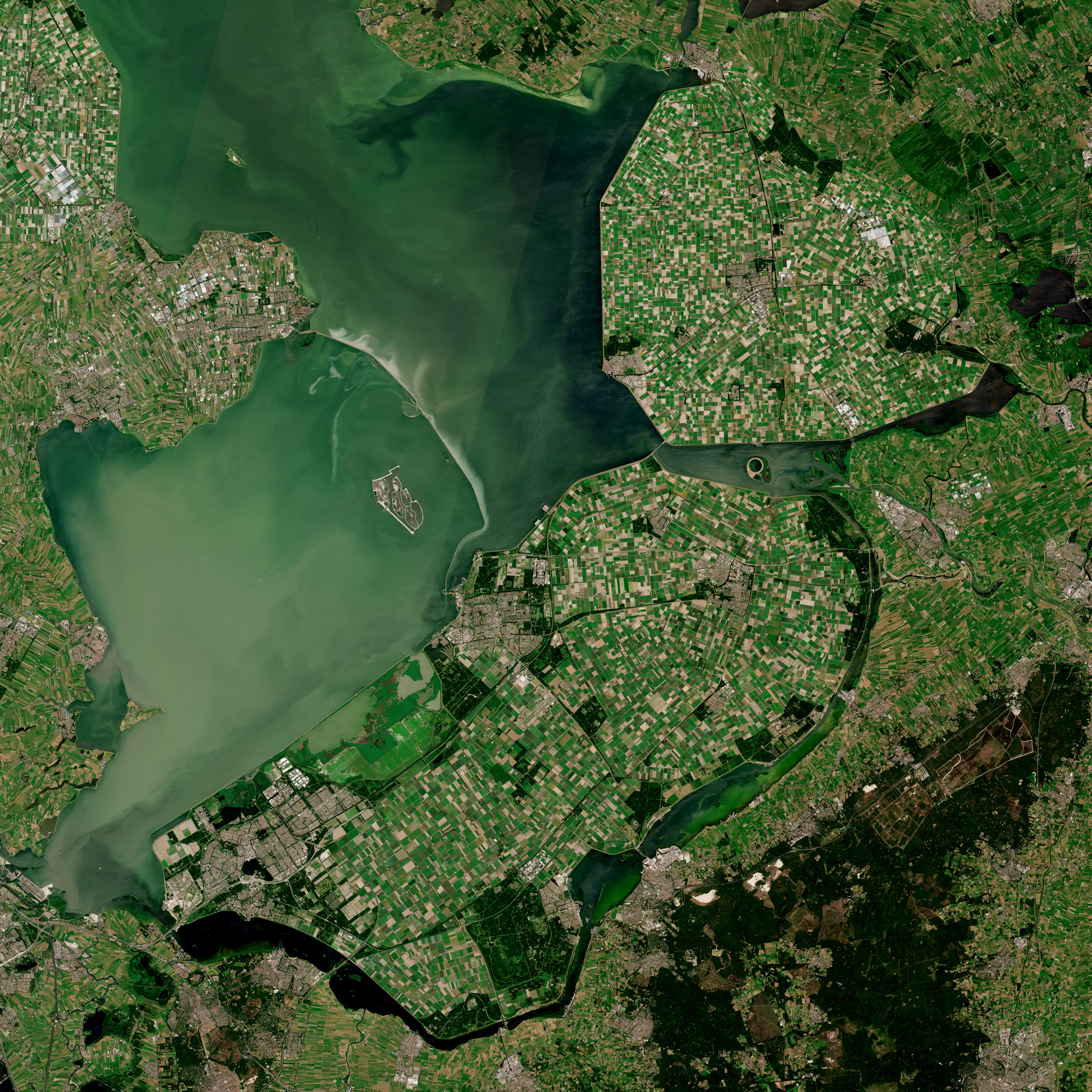
The Flevopolder in the Netherlands is 970 km^{2} (375 sq mi) and is the largest island formed by reclaimed land in the world.

An artificial island or man-made island is an island that has been constructed by humans rather than formed through natural processes. Other definitions may suggest that artificial islands are lands with the characteristics of human intervention in their formation process, while others argue that artificial islands are created by expanding existing islets, constructing on existing reefs, or amalgamating several islets together. Although constructing artificial islands is not a modern phenomenon, there is no clear legal definition of it. Artificial islands may vary in size from small islets reclaimed solely to support a single pillar of a building or structure to those that support entire communities and cities. Archaeologists argue that such islands were created as far back as the Neolithic era. Early artificial islands included floating structures in still waters or wooden or megalithic structures erected in shallow waters (e.g. crannógs and Nan Madol discussed below).

In modern times, artificial islands are usually formed by land reclamation, but some are formed by flooding of valleys resulting in the tops of former knolls getting isolated by water (e.g., Barro Colorado Island). There are several reasons for the construction of these islands, which include residential, industrial, commercial, structural (for bridge pylons) or strategic purposes. One of the world's largest artificial islands, René-Levasseur Island, was formed by the flooding of two adjacent reservoirs. Technological advancements have made it feasible to build artificial islands in waters as deep as 75 meters. The size of the waves and the structural integrity of the island play a crucial role in determining the maximum depth.

== History ==
Despite a popular image of modernity, artificial islands actually have a long history in many parts of the world, dating back to Al-Sayah Island, in Bahrain – the world's first permanent artificial island, created at least 1,200 years ago around a water spring. Ancient reclaimed islands of Ancient Egyptian civilization, the Stilt crannogs of prehistoric Wales, Scotland and Ireland, the ceremonial centers of Nan Madol in Micronesia and the still extant floating islands of Lake Titicaca can also be found. Made around The city of Tenochtitlan, the Aztec predecessor of Mexico City that was home to 500,000 people when the Spaniards arrived, stood on a small natural island in Lake Texcoco that was surrounded by countless artificial chinamitl islands.

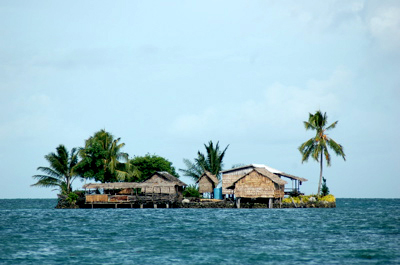
Reef Island off North Malaita

The people of Langa Langa Lagoon and Lau Lagoon in Malaita, Solomon Islands, built about 60 artificial islands on the reef including Funaafou, Sulufou, and Adaege. The people of Lau Lagoon build islands on the reef as this provided protection against attack from the people who lived in the centre of Malaita. These islands were formed literally one rock at a time. A family would take their canoe out to the reef which protects the lagoon and then dive for rocks, bring them to the surface and then return to the selected site and drop the rocks into the water. Living on the reef was also healthier as the mosquitoes, which infested the coastal swamps, were not found on the reef islands. The Lau people continue to live on the reef islands.

Many artificial islands have been built in urban harbors to provide either a site deliberately isolated from the city or just spare real estate otherwise unobtainable in a crowded metropolis. An example of the first case is Dejima (or Deshima), created in the bay of Nagasaki in Japan's Edo period as a contained center for European merchants. During the isolationist era, Dutch people were generally banned from Nagasaki and Japanese from Dejima. Similarly, Ellis Island, in Upper New York Bay beside New York City, a former tiny islet greatly expanded by land reclamation, served as an isolated immigration center for the United States in the late 19th and early 20th century, preventing an escape to the city of those refused entry for disease or other perceived flaws, who might otherwise be tempted toward illegal immigration. One of the most well-known artificial islands is the Île Notre-Dame in Montreal, built for Expo 67.

The Venetian Islands in Miami Beach, Florida, in Biscayne Bay added valuable new real estate during the Florida land boom of the 1920s. When the bubble that the developers were riding burst, the bay was left scarred with the remnants of their failed project. A boom town development company was building a sea wall for an island that was to be called Isola di Lolando but could not stay in business after the 1926 Miami Hurricane and the Great Depression, dooming the island-building project. The concrete pilings from the project still stand as another development boom roared around them, 80 years later.

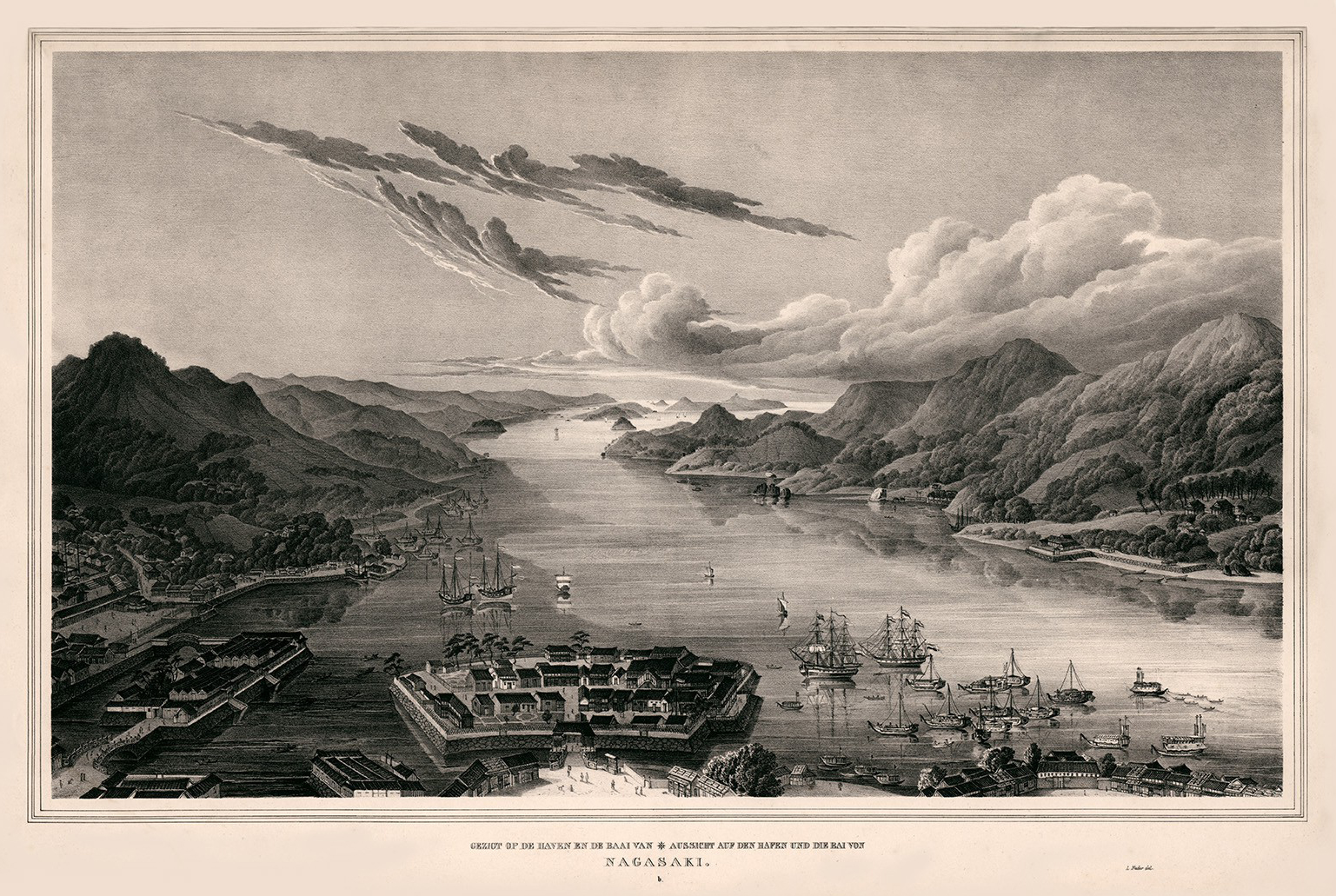
Dejima, not allowed direct contact with nearby Nagasaki

1927 sea wall pilings from the failed Isola di Lolando construction project in Miami Beach, Florida

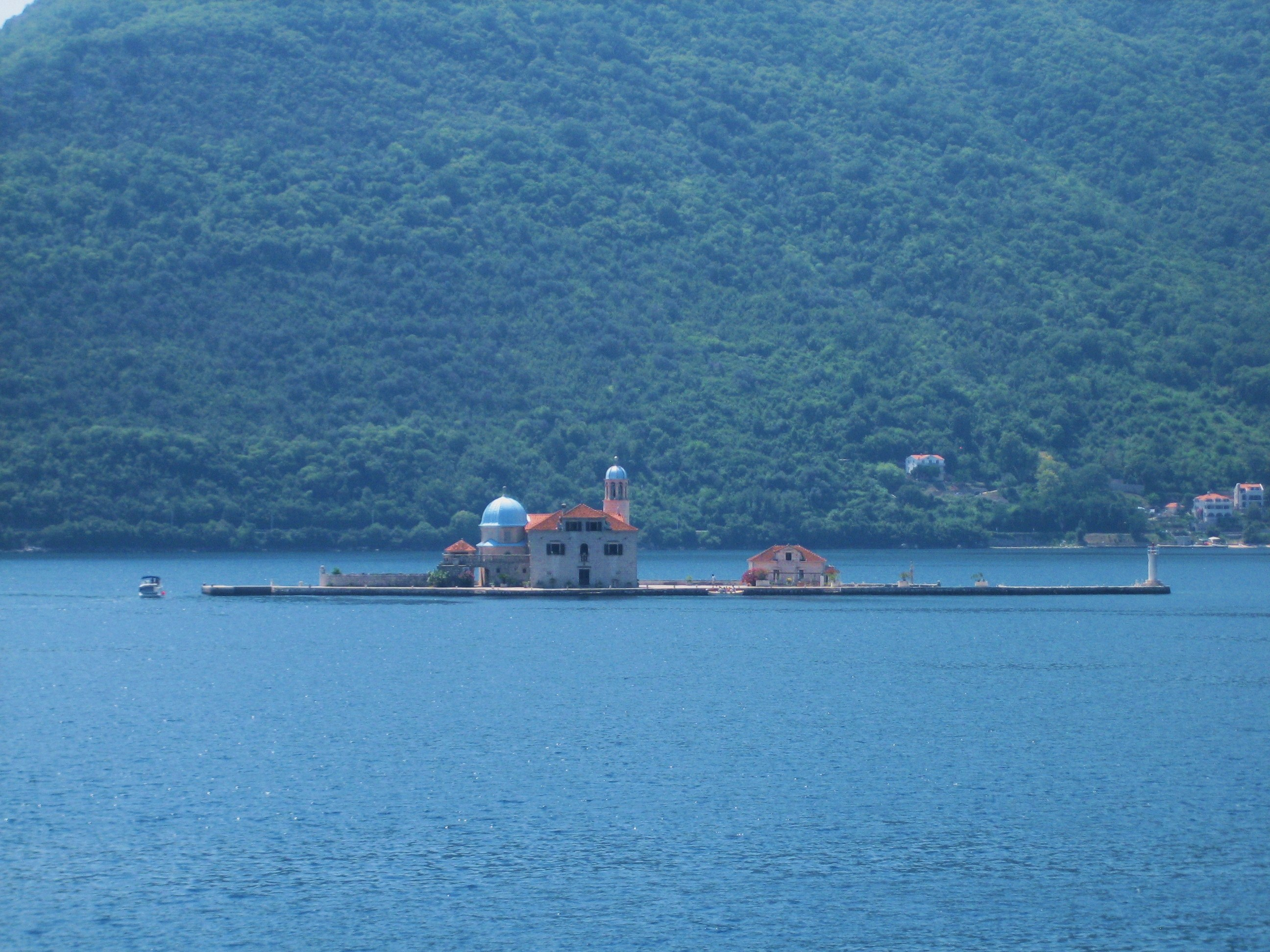
Our Lady of the Rocks (Gospa od Škrpjela) in Montenegro

== Largest artificial islands according to their size (reclaimed lands) ==
| No. | Name | Size (km^{2}) | Location | Year built | Utilisation |
|---|---|---|---|---|---|
| 1 | Flevopolder | 970 | Flevoland, Netherlands | 1955 (East) & 1968 (South) | Towns, agriculture |
| 2 | Chek Lap Kok | 20.64 | Hong Kong | 1998 (Airport Phase 1), 2017 (Border Control Point) & 2022 (Airport Phase 2) | Airport, border control point |
| 3 | The Pearl Island | 13.9 | Doha, Qatar | 2006 | Housing |
| 4 | Diyar Al Muharraq | 12 | Muharraq, Bahrain | 2013 | Town |
| 5 | Kansai International Airport | 10.68 | Osaka, Japan | 1994 | Airport |
| 6 | Sakishima, Osaka | 10.54 | Osaka, Japan | 1970s | Town |
| 7 | Port Island | 8.33 | Kobe, Japan | 1980 (Phase 1) & 2009 (Phase 2) | Housing |
| 8 | Chūbu Centrair International Airport | 6.8 | Tokoname, Japan | 2005 | Airport |
| 9 | Ogizima | 6.71 | Yokohama, Japan | 1975 | Factory |
| 10 | Rokko Island | 5.8 | Kobe, Japan | 1992 | Housing |
| 11 | Fundão Island | 5.23 | Rio de Janeiro, Brazil | 1983 | Federal University of Rio de Janeiro |

== Modern projects ==
=== Bahrain ===
Bahrain has several artificial islands including Northern City, Diyar Al Muharraq, and Durrat Al Bahrain. Named after the 'most perfect pearl' in the Persian Gulf, Durrat Al Bahrain is a US$6 billion joint development owned by the Bahrain Mumtalakat Holding Company and Kuwait Finance House Bahrain (KFH). The project is designed by the firm Atkins. It consists of a series of 15 large artificial islands covering an area of about 5 km2 (54,000,000 sq ft) and has six atolls, five fish-shaped islands, two crescent-shaped islands, and two more small islands related to the Marina area.

=== Netherlands ===
In 1969, the Flevopolder in the Netherlands was finished, as part of the Zuiderzee Works. It has a total land surface of 970 km^{2}, which makes it by far the largest artificial island by land reclamation in the world. The island consists of two polders, Eastern Flevoland and Southern Flevoland. Together with the Noordoostpolder, which includes some small former islands like Urk, the polders form Flevoland, the 12th province of the Netherlands that almost entirely consists of reclaimed land.

An entire artificial archipelago, Marker Wadden has been built as a conservation area for birds and other wildlife; the project started in 2016.

=== Maldives ===
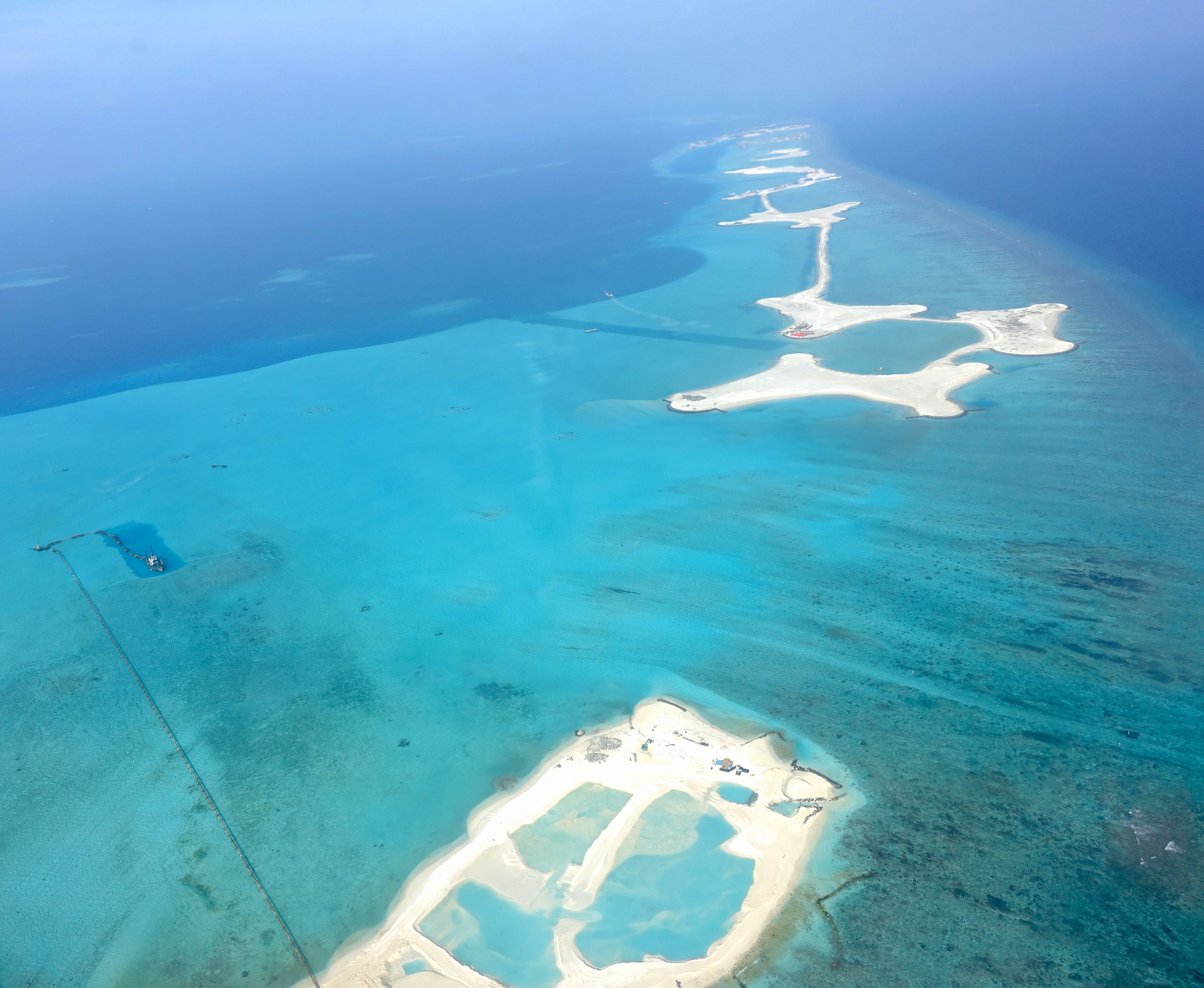
Artificial island construction process in Kaafu Atoll of Maldives in February 2019

Maldives have been creating various artificial islands to promote economic development and to address the threat of rising sea level. Hulhumalé island was reclaimed to establish a new land mass required to meet the existing and future housing, industrial and commercial development demands of the Malé region. The official settlement was inaugurated on May 12, 2004.

=== Qatar ===
The Pearl Island is in the north of the Qatari capital Doha, home to a range of residential, commercial and tourism activities. Qanat Quartier is designed to be a 'Virtual Venice in the Middle East'. Lusail & large areas around Ras Laffan, Hamad International Airport & Hamad Port. Hamad International Airport is the second largest artificial island built in the world, with a size of 22km2. The Pearl-Qatar is the third largest artificial island in the world, with a size of 13.9km2. The island was built in 2006 by the main contractor DEME Group.

=== United Arab Emirates ===
The United Arab Emirates is home to several artificial island projects. They include the Yas Island, augmentations to Saadiyat Island, Khalifa Port, Al Reem Island, Al Lulu Island, Al Raha Creek, al Hudairiyat Island, The Universe and the Dubai Waterfront. Palm Islands (Palm Jumeirah, Palm Jebel Ali, and Deira Island) and the World Islands off Dubai are created for leisure and tourism purposes. The Burj Al Arab is on its own artificial island. The Universe, Palm Jebel Ali, Dubai Waterfront, and Palm Deira are on hold.

=== China ===
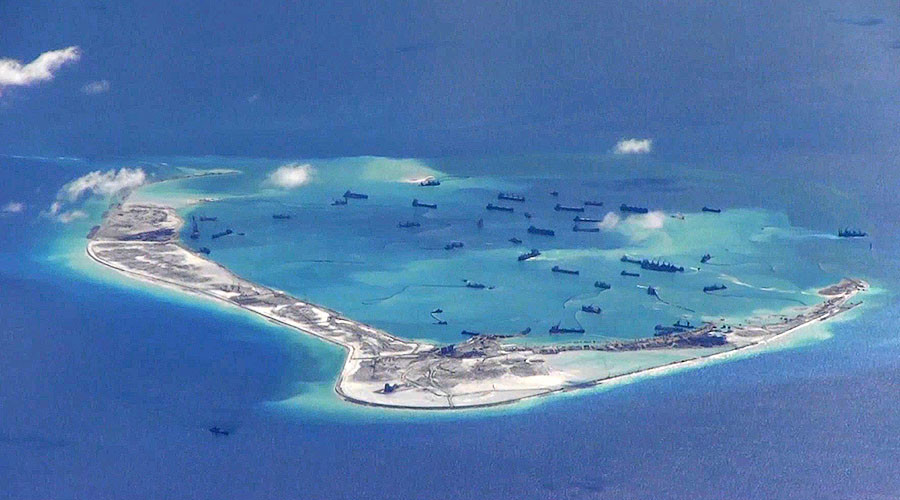
Subi Reef being built by the PRC and transformed into an artificial island, May 2015

For decades, the Philippines and Vietnam were the most active in building artificial islands in the Spratly Islands, but from 2014 to 2016 China's construction activity outpaced them, constructing at least seven islands. By 2023, China had reclaimed around five square miles. One artificial island built on Fiery Cross Reef houses military barracks and a runway long enough to handle Chinese military aircraft.

==== Background ====
The Spratly Islands are claimed by China, Taiwan (Republic of China), and Vietnam. Brunei, Malaysia, and the Philippines also claim some of the features in the island chain. By the 1970s, the Philippines, Taiwan, and Vietnam had militarily occupied one or more of the islands. By 2015, the PRC had established 8 outposts, Malaysia 5, the Philippines 8, Taiwan 1, on the largest Taiping Island, and Vietnam 48, by far the most numerous.

China's claim to the area dates back to at least the 1940s. It began building islands in the 1980s in the form of minor military garrisons. Some of its reclamation projects fall within the EEZs of other countries, which led to criticism and concerns about China's compliance with UNCLOS.

==== Hybrid warfare and greyzone tactics ====
Hybrid warfare is understood as a form of conflict that combines conventional and irregular tactics. Experts suggest that China's island building is driven by strategic objectives. Some argue that its greyzone tactics aim to improve its geopolitical position in a peaceful manner. In contrast to the greyzone tactics used by Russia in Crimea in 2014 and allegedly in the Arctic, China's approach focuses on uninhabited areas at sea, which contradicts a definition of hybrid warfare that is targeted at populations. Additionally, China's objective is not to destabilise or overthrow other states but rather to enhance its control over regional waters. China employs unarmed or lightly armed vessels deliberately, as they are less likely to resort to deadly force. However, others argue that China's greyzone tactics can be classified as hybrid warfare, citing its establishment of military bases on artificial islands.

=== Malaysia ===
Malaysia currently have four active artificial islands, namely as Andaman Island (current largest artificial island) and Silicon Island in Penang, Forest City in Johor, and also Malacca Island in Malacca.

In the near future, Sarawak will have two new largest artificial islands that are set to be built at Tanjung Embang area, which is located between Asajaya and Kuching.

The first artificial island will include a new world-class international airport (which is inspired by Hamad International Airport in Doha, Qatar). Other facilities that are also available on the same island are a new aeronautic & engineering technology university, a new administrative office complex, a new modern commercial city township area, and also new modern residential apartments.

While the second island will includes a new Sarawak owned modern deep sea port complex which is inspired from the well-known Port of Kobe in Kobe, Japan.

=== Indonesia ===
Pantai Indah Kapuk (PIK) in North Jakarta is an area featuring luxury residential and commercial developments. Two artificial islands, Golf Island and Ebony Island, were created to expand the PIK area. They offer facilities, recreational spaces, scenic waterfront views and residential areas.

=== Airports ===
Kansai International Airport was the first airport to be built completely on an artificial island in 1994, followed by Chūbu Centrair International Airport in 2005, and both the New Kitakyushu Airport and Kobe Airport in 2006, Ordu Giresun Airport in 2016, and Rize-Artvin Airport in 2022

When Hong Kong International Airport opened in 1998, 75% of the property was created using land reclamation upon the existing islands of Chek Lap Kok and Lam Chau. Currently China is building several airports on artificial islands, they include runways of Shanghai international Airport Dalian Jinzhouwan International Airport being built on a 21 square kilometer artificial island, Xiamen Xiang'an International Airport, Sanya Hongtangwan International Airport designed by Bentley Systems which is being built on a 28 square kilometer artificial islands.

== Environmental impact ==
Artificial islands negatively impact the marine environment. The large quantities of sand required to build these islands are acquired through dredging, which is harmful to coral reefs and disrupts marine life. The increased amount of sand, sediment, and fine particles creates turbid conditions, blocking necessary UV rays from reaching coral reefs, creating coral turbidity (where more organic material is taken in by coral) and increasing bacterial activity (more harmful bacteria are introduced into coral).

The construction of artificial islands also decreases the subaqueous area in surrounding waters, leading to habitat destruction or degradation for many species.

== Legal status ==
Under the United Nations Convention on the Law of the Sea treaty (UNCLOS), artificial islands are not considered harbor works (Article 11) and are under the jurisdiction of the nearest coastal state if within 200 nautical miles (370 km) (Article 56). Artificial islands are also not considered islands for purposes of having their own territorial waters or exclusive economic zones, and only the coastal state may authorize their construction (Article 60); however, on the high seas beyond national jurisdiction, any "state" may construct artificial islands (Article 87).

According to UNCLOS, low-tide elevations are considered part of the seabed and do not generate a territorial sea, EEZ, or continental shelf. However, they serve as a reference point for measuring the entitlements of nearby rocks or islands. Rocks, unlike islands, lack the capacity to sustain human habitation or support economic activity. While they generate a territorial sea, they do not establish an EEZ or continental shelf. UNCLOS stipulates that both rocks and islands must be naturally formed and remain above water at high tide.

There is no specific rule within international law that prohibits any country from engaging in land reclamation at sea. Within the 12 nautical mile territorial sea, a country holds the right to reclaim land as it falls under its sovereign authority. However, beyond this 12 nautical mile limit, the country must consider whether its actions conform to the rights and jurisdictions recognised by UNCLOS. Reclamation activities conducted between 12 and 200 nautical miles are considered part of the process of establishing and utilising artificial islands, installations, and structures. It is worth mentioning that artificial islands may include stationary oil rigs.

The unrecognised micronation known as the Principality of Sealand (often shortened to simply "Sealand") is entirely on a single artificial island.

== Gallery ==
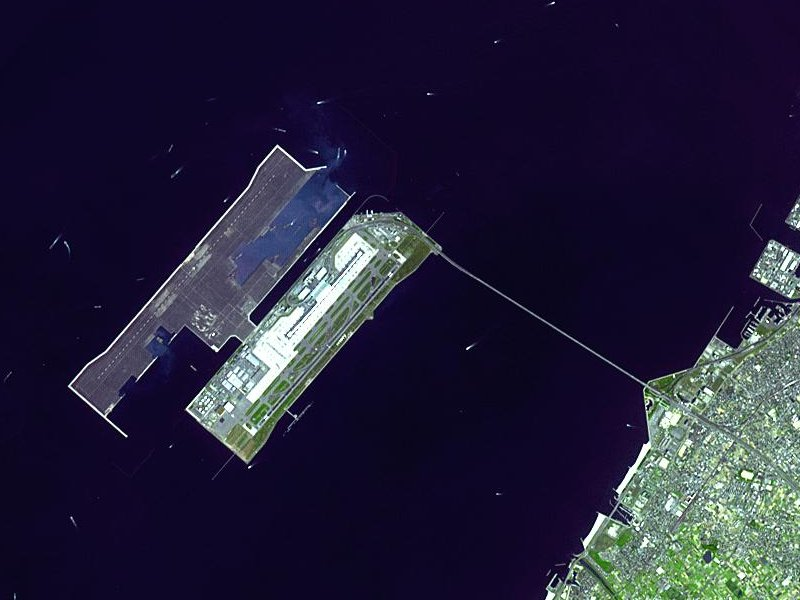
A view of Kansai International Airport from space

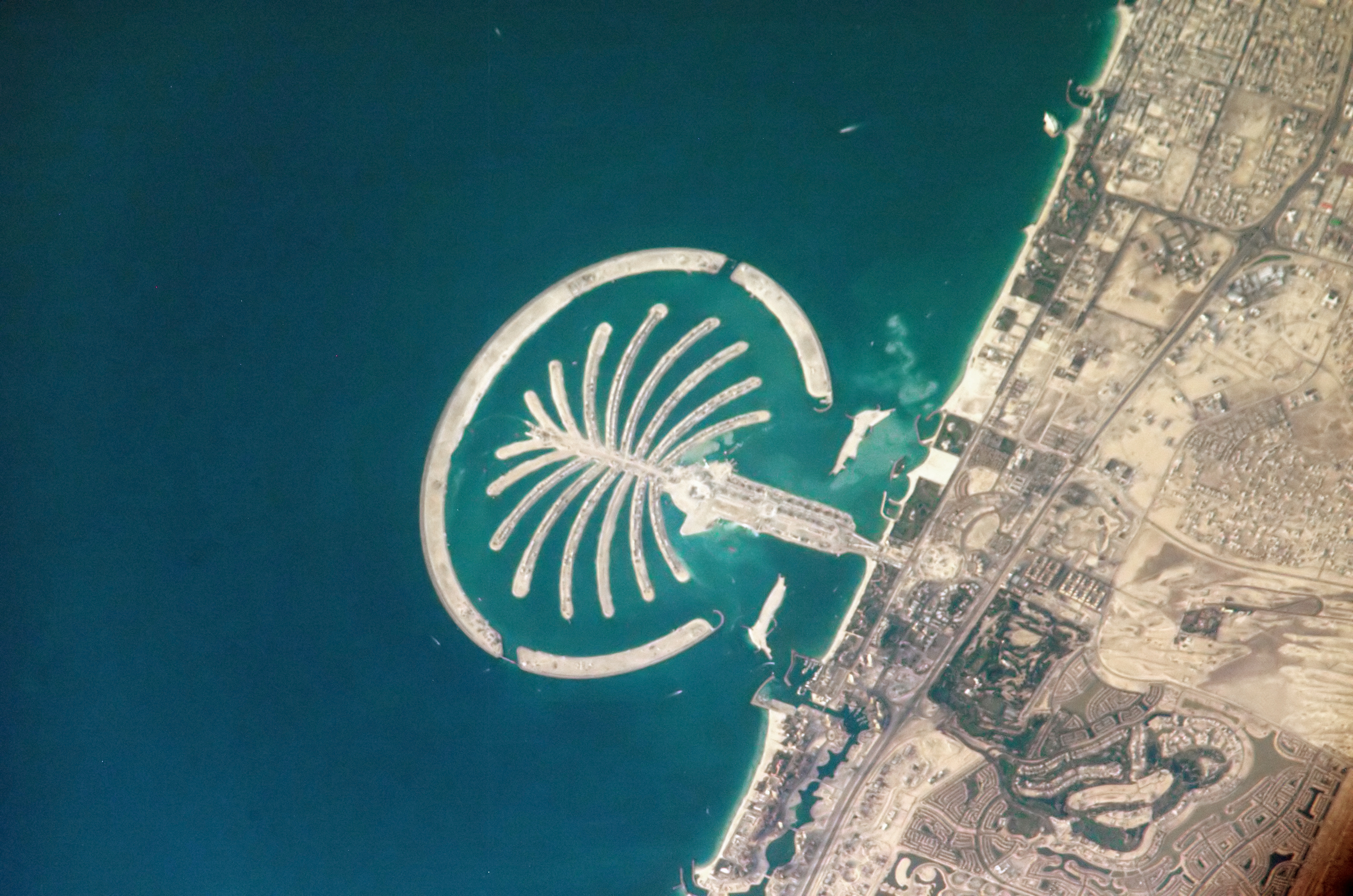
Palm Jumeirah in Dubai

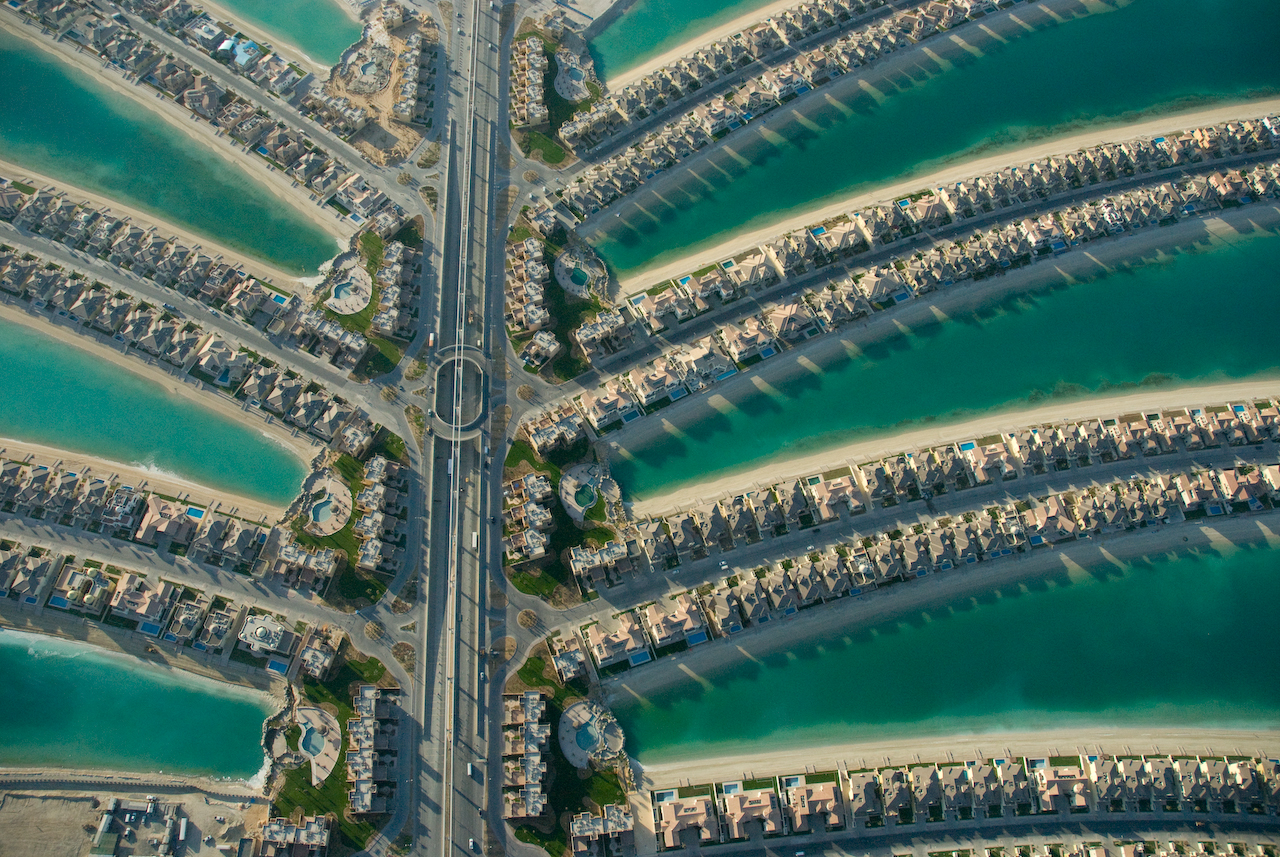
A closer view of the Palm Jumeirah

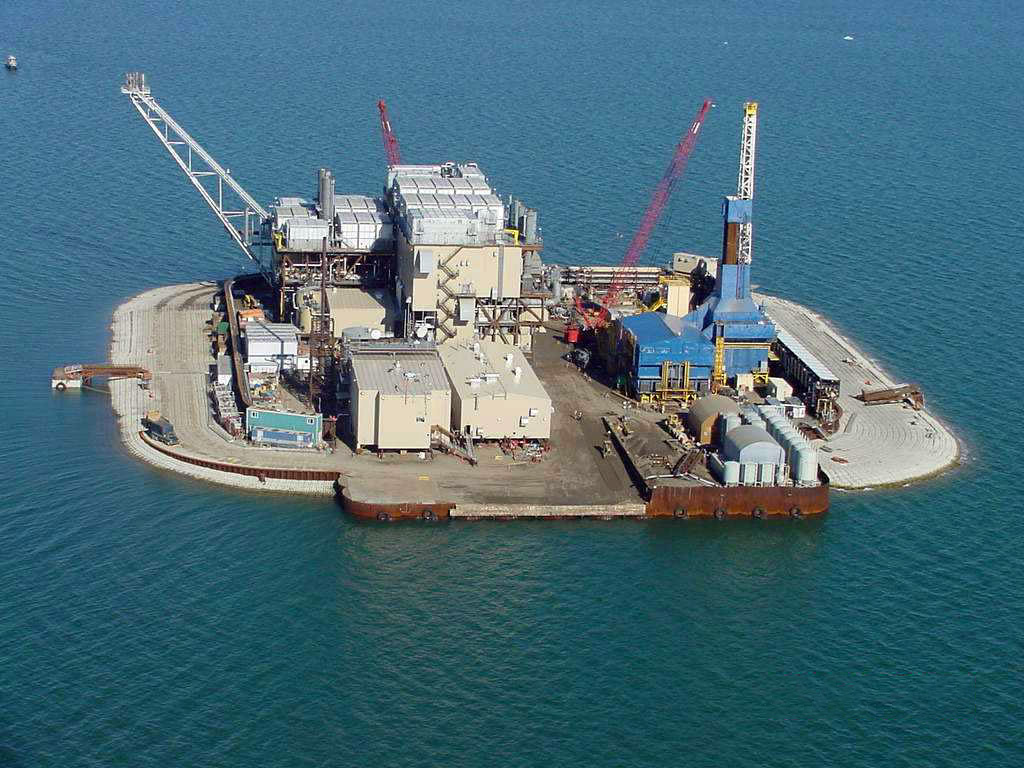
Northstar Island, an artificial island for oil drilling in the Beaufort Sea

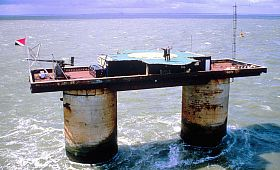
The Principality of Sealand's artificial island in the North Sea

== See also ==
- Artificial hill
- Chinampa
- Discovery Bay, California
- Eko Atlantic
- Land reclamation in Monaco
- List of artificial islands
- Ocean colonization
- Ocean Flower Island
- Offshore geotechnical engineering
- Principality of Sealand
- Republic of Rose Island
- Seasteading
- Very large floating structure
