= Jack Renton =

Scottish seaman, The White Headhunter

- Born: 1848; Orkney, Scotland
- Died: 1878 (age 29/30); Aoba Island, Vanuatu
- Occupations: Seaman, slave, headhunter

John Renton (1848–1878), also known as The White Headhunter, was a Scottish seaman from Orkney. In 1868, he was among four or five deserters from the American ship Renard, which specialised in the trade of guano. He and the other deserters travelled in a small boat for 2,000 miles, and eventually landed at Maana'oba (Manaoba), a small island off the north-east coast of Malaita Island in the Solomon Islands. He became a slave of a bigman named Kabbou for 8 years, in which he learnt the Lau language, participated in the island's culture, and became a headhunter. While on Malaita, he befriended a local warrior, Kwaisulia, and taught him English. He is the only European to have been a headhunter and was the first European to live for a long period on Malaita.

Renton was rescued by a Royal Navy schooner called the Bobtailed Nag in 1875, being traded for "a dozen tomahawks, several yards of calico, some pipes, [and] tobacco", as well as several other items, along with a promise to return with more supplies. He returned to Orkney, where he became a local celebrity. He later travelled back to the South Pacific, fulfilling his promise to return with supplies to the island he had inhabited, before taking up work as a regulator of the recruitment of Melanesian islanders for work in Queensland, where his role was mainly to prevent blackbirding. He was killed in 1878 at Ambae Island, while on a ship called the Mystery. Upon learning of his death, Kabbou and the people of the village Renton had lived in mourned his death by sacrificing 300 pigs in his name, telling tales of his life for 3 days straight, and building a reliquary house which acted as a shrine to his memory. The shrine survived for 85 years until it burned down in 1963.

== See also ==
- Kwaisulia
