= Malu'u =

- Location in the Solomon Islands
- Coordinates: 8°21′0″S 160°38′0″E
- Country: Solomon Islands
- Province: Malaita Province
- Island: Malaita Island
- Time zone: UTC+11 (UTC)
- Climate: Af

Malu'u is a village on the north coast of Malaita island in the Solomon Islands. The seat of the sub provincial area, it lies on Suafa Bay, within Malaita Province, along the road between Auki and Lau Lagoon.

== History ==
The Anglican missionaries Hopkins and Iven visited Malu'u in 1902 and provided copies of Lau language prayer books. By 1905 there were four branch schools in the vicinity, all run by Christians from Queensland, Australia. One school had 49 students and reportedly faced hostility from locals who refused to conform to Christianity. Florence Young of the Queensland Kanaka Mission visited Malu'u in 1904 and found a graveyard overgrown with crotons.

== Landmarks and economy ==
The village contains Malu'u Lodge and a canoe hire centre to visit the lagoon. There is a harbour where a boat can be caught to Honiara. Cocoa is produced by the locals and the government have a fermentary for processing them at Malu'u. The nearby village of Mana'ambu contains the Tofe Takwe Trail Store and is noted for its pancakes.

=== Mbasakana Island ===
There is a long white, sandy beach on the coast, with the small island of Mbasakana about 1.5 kilometres (0.93 mi) off the shore at 8°18′39.6″S 160°34′55.2″E. The island, surrounded by a reef, is just over 2 kilometres (1.2 mi) long and 1 kilometre (0.62 mi) wide.
