= Sanya Hongtangwan International Airport =

Sanya Hongtangwan International Airport 三亚红塘湾国际机场
- IATA: none; ICAO: none

Summary
- Airport type: Public
- Serves: Sanya, Hainan
- Location: Hongtang Bay
- Coordinates: 18°17′39″N 109°16′47″E

Map
- Location of the airport in Hainan Hongtangwan Airport (China)

Sanya Hongtangwan International Airport
- Simplified Chinese: 三亚红塘湾国际机场
- Traditional Chinese: 三亞紅塘灣國際機場
Transcriptions
Standard Mandarin
- Hanyu Pinyin: Sānyà Hóngtángwān Guójì Jīchǎng

Sanya Hongtangwan International Airport is an airport planned to be built to serve the city of Sanya in Hainan Province, China. It would be located on an artificial island in Hongtang Bay, about 20 kilometres (12 mi) west of Sanya. Construction began in 2017, and the airport was expected to be opened in December 2020. However the same year, the project was suspended pending a new environmental assessment following complaints from Chinese environmental agency Friends of Nature. In 2020, part of the construction of the artificial island was deemed illegal, and further land reclamation was halted. In the new plans, the land reclamation was reduced by 0.9 km^{2} (0.35 mi^{2}).

The original plans were for 29.95 km^{2} (11.56 mi^{2}) of sea airport used, 23.99 km^{2} (9.26 mi^{2}) land area, 4 runways, 3 terminal buildings and corresponding supporting auxiliary area.

== See also ==
- List of airports in China
- List of the busiest airports in China
