= John Cromar =

Scottish-Australian seaman and author

- Born: 1859/1860; Aberdeen, Scotland
- Died: 1942 (age 82); Brisbane, Queensland
- Occupations: Sailor and author
- Years active: unknown-1935
- Notable work: Jock of the Islands

John "Jock" Cromar (1859/1860–1942) was a Scottish-Australian seaman and author, who wrote the book Jock of the Islands, a supposed retelling of his experiences in Melanesia during the late 19th century. Described by Charles Morris Woodford as a "derelict of the labor trade", Cromar was for several decades active in the recruiting industry in the Solomon Islands.

== Life and career ==
Cromar was born in Aberdeen, and entered into sailing "at a young age". At the age of 23, Cromar was recruited onto the schooner Forest King, which recruited kanaka labour for sugar and cotton plantations in Queensland. From 1885 to 1886 Cromar was a recruiting officer on the ship Helena, under the command of Aisiselaus Tonarus. Throughout his life, he managed numerous plantations on the Solomon Islands, and was the captain of several small ships. He had good relations with Kwaisulia, the strongest political leader in the area, but somewhat more strained relations with Foulanga, another prominent local leader, who Cromar described as "a man who it was unsafe to put any trust in at all". In his later years, he mostly operated as a trader on Marovo Island. He lived in the Solomon Islands until late 1936, when he left for Australia. Cromar continued to sail until the age of 75.

=== Jock of the Islands ===
In 1935, Cromar's book Jock of the Islands, published by Faber & Faber and edited by Stanley Knibbs, was released. The book was noted as one of the few first-hand accounts of experiences in Melanesia during the time period it covered. It was originally released for the price of eight shillings and sixpence. Cromar claimed in Jock of the Islands that, while aboard the Forest King, he had been told a story of the murder of John Gibson Paton and his wife, who in actuality died peacefully. Cromar also claimed to have seen an islander with an eight-inch tail.

Jock of the Islands was well received by critics. The Melbourne-based newspaper The Australasian gave a positive review of the book, describing it as "a tale of romance and strange adventure", and "though dark with tragedy...an entertaining book", while also praising its illustrations, and noting Cromar's frankness when discussing sexual liaisons between sailors and local women. H.M. Hall, whose comments were published in The Worker, described it as "interesting", declaring that it would "be of interest to old-school Laborites". In their review of the book, The Sun declared that Cromar "tells picturesquely the story, as he saw it, of an almost forgotten phase of our industrial story", and declared that "There is not much literary grace in the writing, but it is a lively narrative, and well worth reading." As a work, Jock of the Islands is not focused on the routine business of recruiting, instead being focused more on stories of the dangerous and romantic encounters Cromar claims to have experienced during his career. This has made it somewhat frustrating for historians to study and analyse the book.

== Death ==
Cromar died shortly prior to 4 December 1942 in Brisbane, of unspecified causes at the age of 82. He remained unmarried throughout his life.

== See also ==
- Charles Morris Woodford
