= Funaafou =

Artificial island in Solomon Islands

Coordinates: 8°24′S 160°49′E

Funaafou or Funa'afou is an artificial island built on the reef in the Lau Lagoon off the northeast coast of Malaita Island. Administratively, it is in the Malaita Province of Solomon Islands. Funa'afou island, which is near the edge of the Makwanu Passage, has about 200 inhabitants. It is the first artificial Island built in the Lau lagoon. According to history, the people of Baleo tribe are the first descendants of Funafou Islands
