= Harold M. Ross =

American cultural anthropologist

Harold M. Ross is a cultural anthropologist who studied the Baegu community and culture on the island of Malaita in the Solomon Islands. He conducted his field research in the mid-1960s and summarized his research for his doctoral thesis, publishing his work and receiving a PhD in anthropology from Harvard University in 1970. Following his research, Ross taught anthropology at the University of Illinois Urbana-Champaign before moving onto positions in academic administration at multiple institutions.

In addition, Ross was an officer in the U.S. Navy, serving on the diesel submarine USS Spikefish and the aircraft carrier USS Hancock (CV-19) during the Vietnam War before retiring as a captain in the US Naval Reserve.

== Early life and education ==
Ross was born in Kansas City, MO in 1936 and was the only child of Marion and Gertrude Ross.

Ross attended Harvard University, receiving a BA in 1958, an MA in 1967 and a PhD in 1970. While teaching at the University of Illinois he received an MBA from Eastern Illinois University in 1974.

== Anthropological research ==
Ross conducted primary research on Melanesian and Pacific cultures. He was one of many anthropologists who worked and continue to study the island of Malaita including Ian Hogbin, Harold Scheffler, Roger Keesing, Matthew Cooper, Ben Burt and David Akin.

Ross' research included documentation, analysis and interpretation of the daily living, language, history, art, traditions and social organizations of the Baegu people, a community of approximately 6,000 people living along the headwaters of the Sasafa river in the hills on the north eastern coast of Malaita.

Ross' professional papers are currently being cataloged at the Melanesian Studies Resource Center at the Social Sciences and Humanities Library at the University of California, San Diego.

The cultural artifacts that Ross collected during his field studies have been donated to the University of Michigan Museum of Anthropology.

== Professional history ==
Following his field studies Ross became a professor at the University of Illinois Urbana-Champaign teaching undergraduate classes and mentoring graduate students in the Department of Anthropology.

In 1976 Ross moved into academic administration with various roles at St. Norbert College, Daemen College and as the Vice President of Academic Affairs at Cottey College in Nevada, MO.

== Personal life ==
He married Kathryn Penstone in 1958 and Nancy Hurlbutt in 1983. Ross' family includes children Edward Ross, Anne Ross, David Ross, Scott Ross and stepson Rob Hulburt.

== Publications ==
- Baegu: Social and Ecological Organization in Malaita, Solomon Islands. Chicago: University of Illinois Press, 1973 ISBN 978-0-252-00272-4
- Interaction Assumptions in Baegu (Malaita) Kin Terms 1968.
- Stone Adzes from Malaita. Solomon Islands: An Ethnographic Contribution to Melanesian Archaeology.
- Bush Fallow Farming, Diet and Nutrition: A Melanesian Example of Successful Adaptation In E Giles; J Friedlander (eds) The Measures of Man: Methodologies in Biological Anthropology, pp. 550–615
- The Sweet Potato in the South-Eastern Solomons. Journal of the Polynesian Society 1977 Volume 86, No. 4 pp-521-530
- Baegu Markets, Areal Integration, and Economic Efficiency in Malaita, Solomon Islands
- Competition for Baegu souls: mission rivalry on Malaita, Solomon Islands. In Mission, church and sect in Oceania, ed. by James A. Boutilier, Daniel T. Hughes and Sharon W. Tiffany. Ann Arbor: Michigan UP, pp. 163–200.

== Citations ==
- Oceania: The Native Cultures of Australia and the Pacific Islands Douglas L. Oliver ISBN 978-0-8248-1019-1 pp 1083–1086
- Custom and Confrontation The Kwaio Struggle for Cultural Autonomy Roger M. Keesing ISBN 978-0-226-42920-5 pp 67
