= Oroha language =

Austronesian language spoken in the Solomon Islands

Oroha
- Region: South Malaita, Solomon Islands
- Ethnicity: Oroha people
- Native speakers: (38 cited 1999)
- Language family: Austronesian: Malayo-Polynesian; Oceanic; Southeast Solomonic; Malaita – San Cristobal; Malaita; Southern; Oroha

Language codes
- ISO 639-3: ora
- Glottolog: oroh1237
- ELP: Oroha
- Oroha is classified as Severely Endangered by the UNESCO Atlas of the World's Languages in Danger.

Oroha, categorized as an Austronesian language, is one of many languages spoken by Melanesian people in the Solomon Islands. It is also known as Maramasike (after the Maramasike Passage that separates Malaita Province's two main islands, where masike means 'little'), Mara Ma-Siki (literally "Little Mala/Mara" [to 'Tolo' people who do not have the sound [l] in their language], after the area), Oraha, and Oloha, and is used primarily in the southern part of Malaita Island within the Malaita Province. Little Mala is composed of three indigenous languages of the 'Tolo' people which are Na’oni, Pau, and Oroha. They are all slightly different, yet come from the same origin. The three languages may be thought of as different dialects of the same language. The three Tolo villages now harbor schools under the Melanesian Mission.

There are 38 people who still currently use the Oroha language today. Oroha is an indigenous, endangered Oceanic language, and its current status is shifting, meaning that its speaker community is in the process of speaking a different language, to the Sa'a language, another indigenous language of the Solomon Islands. Most of the Oroha speakers already know how to read Sa'a; therefore, it is easy to convert to using this other language. Comparing Sa'a to the Oroha language, one can see their common origins. For example, [d] in the Sa’a language corresponds to a [s] or, more commonly, to a [t] in Oroha.

The Oroha people have come from the dividing channel in Mala to their current residence. Most of the Oroha language speakers believe in Christianity.

== Phonology ==
=== Phonemes ===
The Oroha language consists of the ten consonants and five vowels presented below.

Consonant Phonemes
	Labial	Dental	Velar	Glottal
Nasal	m	n		
Plosive	p	t	k	
Fricative	f	s		h
Liquid		r		
Glide	w			

Vowel Phonemes
	Front	Mid	Back
High	i		u
Mid	e		o
Low		a	

Vowels have long and short versions. Doubling a vowel elongates the sound. A <ʻ> indicates the removal of a consonant, usually [k] or [t] are usually removed. The [r] is not rolled. Oraha lack a velar nasal [ŋ]; the dental nasal [n] is used instead.

Words can sometimes be spelled differently, indicating a slightly different pronunciation as well. For example, for 'go, come', both raa and ra are written.

=== Diphthongs ===
The diphthongs in Oroha are ae, ai, ao, au, ei, and ou.

=== Syllable Structure ===
Oroha consists only of open syllables. There are no closed syllables.

=== Reduplication ===
Verbs may be reduplicated to intensity the meaning of words. This may be done in three ways:

1. repetition of the first syllable; suri to susuri
2. repetition of the whole word; horo to horohoro
3. repetition of the whole word with the omission of the inner consonant in the former member. rahi to rairahi

It can also be used to form plurality of words. For example, mere means child while meramera means children.

== Morphology ==
=== Prefixes ===
==== Adjective Prefixes ====
Prefixes that precede some adjectives include ma-, taʻi-, take-, tara-, and tata-.

==== Verb Prefixes ====
There are causative and reciprocal prefixes that are added to the beginning of verbs. The causative prefix is ha'a, while the reciprocal prefix is hai and can indicate a change or addition when adverb or'u is added. There are a few that may also be prefixed to nouns and adjectives as well.

ke'e hai sieni ro'u
NEG {indicates change/addition} good again
It will never be any good again.

==== Plurality ====
Moi and mo precede nouns to indicate plurality. For example, mo hanua iwera can mean either 'many lands' or 'many people'.

=== Suffixes ===
==== Noun Suffixes ====
Pronouns can be suffixed to other words to either add on to or change the meaning of a word. This is used mainly to show possession of an object with a noun. For example, maa 'eye' can be suffixed with the first person singular possessive suffix -ku to create maaku 'my eye'.

In other cases, pronouns can be added as a suffix to verbs or prepositions to reference the object of the sentence.

==== Adjective Suffixes ====
The endings -ʻa and -taʻa are placed in back of some adjectives.

==== Verb Suffixes ====
Suffixes may be included at the end of verbs in order to indicate gender. There are two forms of suffixes that can be added to verbs. The first is i which can stand by itself or with a consonant added prior to it. The second form is the termination of a'i which is suffixed to nouns to make the words into verbs.

{pa'ura (i) suna} {[ka] sasua'i} maaku
{smoke of fire (into)} {[plural inclusive] to smoke} eye
The smoke has got into my eyes.

== Syntax ==
=== Word Order ===
The word order for Oroha sentence structure is typically Subject, Verb, Object (SVO).

Adjectives tend to take place after the noun.

Verb particles are placed before verbs.

Example sentence:

Nemo paina, mane {ka ma'uma'u} uhi ine'ia {ka ta'a}, {ka iria huni mane saia}: "Noko waai'o ana ha'a poo, oko ha'asaso ro'u." Mane saia {ka iria}: "Siena, {ne'ia ka'u}, {ka sas} ro'u."
Rain great, man fears yams his {are spoilt}, {says to man (that) knows}: "I {reward you} with {shell money}, pigs, you {make sun} again." Man {(that) knows} says: "Good, {wait awhile}, {fine (weather)} again."
There is a lot of rain, so the man fears that his yams are spoilt, and says to the man that knows, "I will reward you with shell money and pigs if you make the sun come out again." The man that knows says, "Good, wait awhile, and fine weather will come again."

=== Word Classes ===
==== Nouns ====
Nouns can be categorized into two set: (1) verbal nouns and (2) independent nouns.

Verbal nouns are produced when adding -na, -ta, -ra, -raa, -ha, or -h to the end of a verb root. For example, mae 'to die' can be suffixed to create the derived form maena 'death'. This same derivational process can also be applied to adjectives, as in sieni 'good' and sienina 'goodness'.

Independent nouns are created using na, which is added to the back of a noun to either indicate some kind of relationship or to change cardinal numbers to ordinal ones (see Numerals table at the bottom of the page).

==== Verbs ====
Verbs depict an action. The Oroha language has something known as verb particles. These particles are used as prefixes with the actual verb to create words. The particles ko, koi, ka, ke, and kaʻi may be used.

==== Adjectives ====
Modifiers follow their head noun. Special adjectives can be used to compare objects. They are usually paired together with prepositions or adverbs to show this comparison. For example, riutaa 'beyond, in excess' shows a comparison between two or more objects.

==== Adverbs ====
There are four categories of adverbs:

1. condition
2. manner
3. time
4. place

== Numerals ==
Number	Cardinal numbers	Ordinal numbers
1	ʻeta	ʻetana
2	rua	ruana
3	ʻooru	ʻooruna
4	hai	haina
5	nima	nimana
6	ʻoono	ʻoonona
7	hiu	hiuna
8	waru	waruna
9	siwa	siwana
10	tanaharu	tanaharuʻana

Ordinal numbers come before the noun when describing how many of an object exist.
