= Oroha people =

The Oroha (pronounced [ˈoroha]) are a Melanesian people inhabiting several villages on the southern end of Small Malaita in the Solomon Islands. They typically speak the Oroha language, use Pijin as a lingua franca, can commonly read Sa'a, and learn English in school.
