= Kolovrat, Tuzla =

Kolovrat
- Village
- Location within Bosnia and Herzegovina
- Coordinates: 44.5428382°N 18.723209°E
- Country: Bosnia and Herzegovina
- Entity: Federation of Bosnia and Herzegovina
- Canton: Tuzla
- Municipality: Tuzla

Area
  - Total: 0.79 sq mi (2.04 km^{2})

Population (2013)
  - Total: 238
  - Density: 302/sq mi (117/km^{2})
- Time zone: UTC+1 (CET)
  - Summer (DST): UTC+2 (CEST)

Kolovrat is a village in the municipality of Tuzla, Tuzla Canton, Bosnia and Herzegovina.

== Demographics ==
According to the 2013 census, its population was 238.

Ethnicity in 2013
Ethnicity	Number	Percentage
Croats	125	52.5%
Bosniaks	90	37.8%
Serbs	15	6.3%
other/undeclared	8	3.4%
Total	238	100%
