= Mount Kalourat =

Mountain of Malaita, Solomon Islands

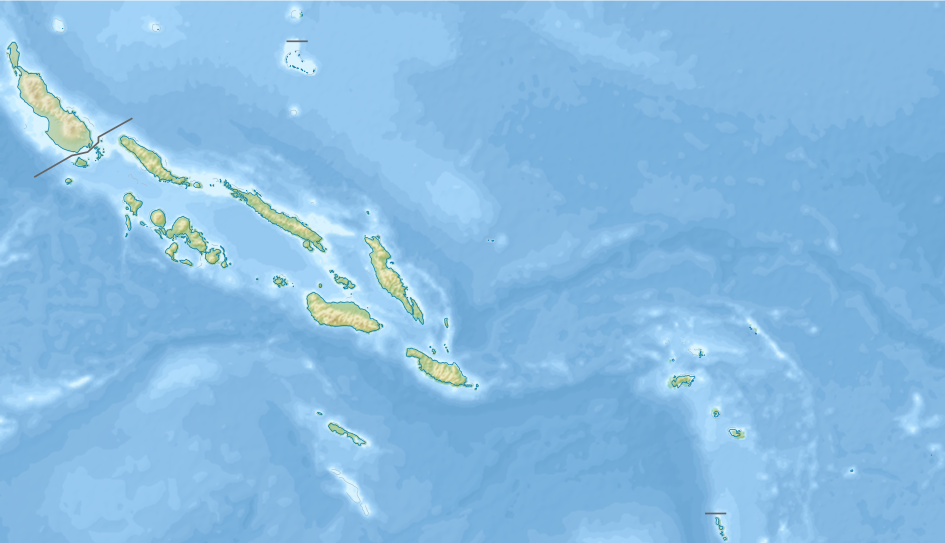
- Location within Solomon Islands

Highest point
- Elevation: 1,303 m (4,275 ft)
- Prominence: 1,303 m (4,275 ft)
- Isolation: 109.54
- Listing: Ribu
- Coordinates: 8°47′S 160°50′E

Geography
- Location: Malaita Island, Solomon Islands

Mount Kalourat or Kolovrat is a highest mountain in the Malaita Island in Solomon Islands. Elevation is 1,303 metres (4,275 ft) above the sea. Located in middle central of island.
