= Maramasike Passage =

Passage in the Solomon Islands

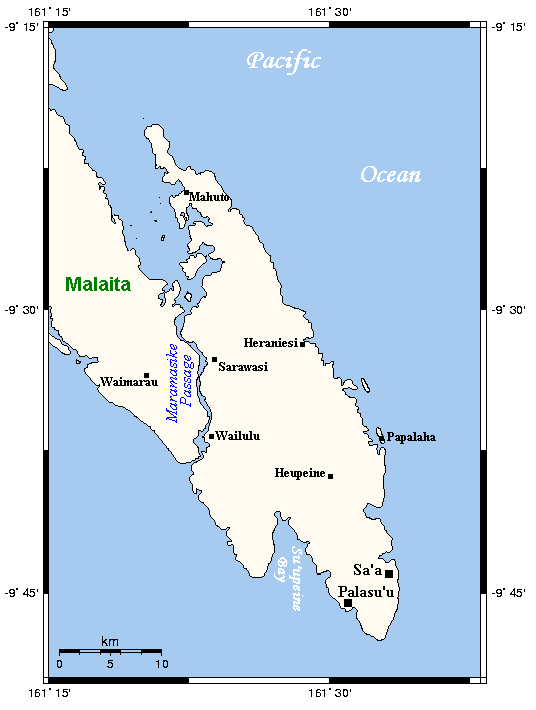
- Interactive map of Maramasike Passage
- Location: Solomon Islands
- Type: passage
- Max. length: 28 miles (45 km)

The Maramasike Passage (9°33′S 161°24′E) is a narrow passage which separates the two main islands of Malaita Province in the Solomon Islands, the larger Malaita and the smaller South Malaita Island, also known as Maramasike. A similar passage is found between the Nggela Islands. The channel is the result of volcanic activity. The northern mouth leads to Raroi Su'u Lagoon, a sheltered bay.

The channel is 28 miles long and is navigable by small vessels. The northern mouth is much wider than the southern mouth, and is several miles wide with scattered barrier islands and mangrove patches. It narrows at the southern end, and is much deeper and is surrounded by cliffs. In places, the passage is less than 400 m wide and only about 4 m deep.

The Saltwater Crocodile may inhabit the area, particularly the Taha River and Taramata Creek near the northern end of the passage.

There are several villages along the passage, particularly on the northern stretch.

A protected area including the passage, the 'Are'are Lagoon, southern Malaita and western South Malaita has been proposed.
