= ꞋAreꞌare language =

Oceanic language of the Solomon Islands

ꞌAreꞌare
- Areare
- Native to: Solomon Islands
- Region: southern Malaita, Solomon Islands
- Ethnicity: ꞌAreꞌare
- Native speakers: (18,000 cited 1999)
- Language family: Austronesian: Malayo-Polynesian; Oceanic; Southeast Solomonic; Malaita – San Cristobal; Malaita; Southern Malaita; ꞌAreꞌare
- Dialects: ꞌAreꞌare; Marau Sound; 5+ other dialects

Language codes
- ISO 639-3: alu
- Glottolog: area1240

The ꞌAreꞌare language is a Southeast Solomonic language spoken by the ꞌAreꞌare people of the southern part of Malaita island, as well as nearby South Malaita Island and the eastern shore of Guadalcanal (the Marau Sound, 60 km (37 mi) away), in the Solomon Islands archipelago. It is spoken by approximately 18,000 people, making it the second-largest Oceanic language in the Solomons after Kwara'ae (also spoken on Malaita). The literacy rate for ꞌAreꞌare is estimated to be between 30% and 60% for first language speakers, and 25% to 50% for second language learners. Portions of the Bible were translated into the language between 1957 and 2008.

The earliest lexicographic record of the language is Peter Geerts's 1970 dictionary. A morphosyntactic and phonological description was published by Kateřina Naitoro in 2013.

== Sociolinguistic context ==
ꞌAreꞌare is in vigorous use throughout its speech community. Multilingualism is common; due to the proximity of language boundaries and frequent intermarriage, many speakers are fluent in neighbouring vernaculars. The national lingua franca, Solomon Islands Pijin, is used for inter-ethnic communication, while English remains the language of formal education and administration.

The language has a high degree of dialectal variation. While exact dialect boundaries are fluid, speakers generally recognise over ten dialectal varieties across the west coast, east coast and inland areas of southern Malaita, with a generalised "middle" dialect continuum stretching from Ta'arutona to Rohinari.

=== Demographics and culture ===
The number of native speakers saw a steep increase in the late 20th century, growing from an estimated 9,000 in 1983 to 18,000 in 1999. This is consistent with the overall population growth of the archipelago, as the total population of the Solomon Islands rose from 285,176 in 1986 to 515,870 in 2009. While the speaker population is primarily concentrated in southern Malaita, a significant diaspora resides in the capital, Honiara, on the island of Guadalcanal.

The speakers live as hunters and agriculturalists. Although the population is largely Christian today, traditional ꞌAreꞌare culture places great importance on the relationship between ancestors and the land. Burial grounds and other sites are viewed as holding significant spiritual and "ancestral power", as is evident in the language's vocabulary and oral histories.

=== Orthography and literacy ===
ꞌAreꞌare has no indigenous writing system, and literacy in it was introduced only recently; knowledge was traditionally passed down orally through myths and sacred chants. Because of this, recording the language and local beliefs has historically been difficult, and an official written standard has yet to be universally established.

Currently, the language is written using the Latin script. A primary point of orthographic variation among speakers is the representation of the glottal stop, which is written either with an apostrophe (⟨ꞌ⟩; the traditional method) or with the IPA symbol ⟨ʔ⟩. Local groups such as the Wairokai Translation Committee have worked towards a standardised orthography, with the aim of incorporating it into the school curriculum.

== Phonology ==
Typologically, ꞌAreꞌare has a relatively small, highly asymmetrical phoneme inventory, notably lacking the voiced plosives, lateral liquids and labio-velar consonants common in closely related Malaitan languages (such as Kwara'ae or Toqabaqita).

=== Consonants ===
Consonant phonemes
	Bilabial	Alveolar	Velar	Glottal
Nasal	m	n		
Plosive	p	t	k	ʔ ⟨ꞌ⟩
Tap		ɾ ⟨r⟩		
Fricative		s		h
Approximant			w	

The plosives (p, t, k, ʔ) are uniformly voiceless and unaspirated. The approximant /w/ has an allophone [β] when it occurs intervocalically (e.g., /ewa/ is realised as [ʔeβa] 'be long'). The glottal stop /ʔ/ is phonemic (e.g., toꞌi 'work' vs. toꞌo 'hit'), though it also surfaces predictably as a hiatus-filling onset for word-initial short vowels. The two fricatives are contrasted in the minimal pair rasu 'smoke' vs. rahu 'to be old'.

=== Vowels ===
ꞌAreꞌare has a classic five-vowel system, distinguishing between short and long vowels. Length is phonemic across all five vowels.

Vowel phonemes
	Front	Central	Back
High	i		u
Mid	e		o
Low		a	

Minimal pairs demonstrating the phonemic status of vowel length include:

- isu 'move' vs. iisu 'count, read'
- tete 'pebble' vs. teete 'mother'
- masika 'small' vs. maasika 'worm'
- oto 'throw, spear' vs. ooto 'meet'
- ꞌuta 'what' vs. uuta 'rain'

A prominent morphophonemic process in the language is the raising of the low central vowel /a/. Near the high vowels /i/ and /u/, short /a/ undergoes raising and is typically realised as the schwa [ə] (e.g., /paina/ 'be big' → [pəinə]).

== Pronunciation points ==
ˡ: no equivalent; breathe in and choke off airflow (ʔ)

r: rolled r (ɾ)

== Grammar ==
=== Lexical categories ===
Because ꞌAreꞌare lexical categories are for the most part not distinguished morphologically, the syntactic position of a word is often necessary to determine its function. The language has a high degree of heterosemy, where a single root can function across multiple lexical categories. For example, the noun raeꞌareha 'knowledge' is derived from the incorporated verb root rae-ꞌare 'to be knowledgeable'; however, its individual components rae and ꞌare can also function as separate, free lexemes meaning 'to know' and 'thing', respectively.

=== Verbs ===
Verbs in ꞌAreꞌare lack inflectional morphology and do not show agreement with the subject. Instead of verbal inflection, tense and aspect are expressed via preverbal particles. The subject is usually expressed by a noun phrase or an independent pronoun, which can be followed by a subject marker (an independent particle, not a verbal prefix).

Based on transitivity, verbs fall into three categories:

1. Strictly intransitive
2. Strictly transitive
3. Ambitransitive

=== Tense ===
ꞌAreꞌare has a basic tense distinction between future and non-future. The non-future tense is morphologically unmarked, whereas the future tense is marked across all predicate types. Non-verbal clauses can only be used in the non-future; in the future tense, a copular verb is obligatorily required.

This future/non-future distinction is also maintained in clausal negation. The non-future is negated with the preverbal particle ma, whereas the particle si is used for future negation. For example, Na=ma maꞌasu translates to "I didn't sleep", while replacing the particle yields Na=si maꞌasu, "I will not sleep". Furthermore, for active and stative verbal predicates, the positive future is marked by the preverbal particle ka rao. Thus, the unmarked Na maꞌasu means "I slept", whereas Na=ka rao maꞌasu translates to "I will sleep".

=== Nouns ===
ꞌAreꞌare nouns are generally not structurally distinct from other classes, making zero-derivation common depending on syntactic context. Nouns are subdivided into the following categories:

1. Common and proper nouns
2. Count and mass nouns
3. Directly (inalienable) and indirectly (alienable) possessed nouns

Proper nouns consist of personal names and place names. Common nouns include a specific sub-category of "absolute locative nouns", which refers to locations, buildings and geographical features (e.g., gardens, the sea), and which share with place names the ability to take the directional preposition hi 'to'.

=== Pronouns ===
The language has personal, possessive and relative pronouns that do not distinguish between animate and inanimate referents. Personal pronouns are distinguished by singular, dual and plural number. The dual and plural pronouns feature a clusivity distinction: inclusive pronouns include the addressee in the group, whereas exclusive pronouns refer to the speaker and others, explicitly excluding the addressee.

== Vocabulary ==
=== Indigenous words ===
The ꞌAreꞌare lexicon generates new vocabulary through compounding and object incorporation. Endocentric noun compounds typically combine a noun with a verb or another noun to describe specific phenomena or objects, with examples below:

ꞌaikarua
ꞌai-karui=a
tree-hollow.out=TR
'dugout canoe'

pusuasi
pusu-asi
burst-sea
'whale'

Object incorporation also produces generic occupational and action-oriented vocabulary, such as:

tapo-marike
catch-fish
'fish-catching'

hanari-poo
feed-pig
'pig-feeding'

=== Loanwords ===
Alongside its core native Oceanic vocabulary, ꞌAreꞌare has several loanwords for concepts and items introduced after European contact. Loanwords from English (and in many cases, via Solomon Islands Pijin) often add epenthetic and paragogic vowels to conform to the native (C)V syllable structure. Common examples include:

- hakesi 'axe'
- kapaa 'copper' (galvanised iron)
- kapu 'cup'
- naihi 'knife'
- Pauro 'Paul'
- sereni 'white man's money' (from Pijin selen 'money', in turn from English 'shilling')

=== Ethnosemantic classification ===
The ꞌAreꞌare language has a highly structured taxonomic classification for acoustic and musical phenomena. Zemp (1978)'s ethnosemantic analysis, drawing on Geerts (1970)'s dictionary, identifies four primary categories of musical production, distinguished by physical mode of sound generation, performance type and social function:

1. ꞌAu: A highly polysemous category. While its baseline definition is 'bamboo' (or non-musical bamboo objects like masts and fishing rods), musically it encompasses any instrument made of bamboo, the ensembles that play them (such as panpipes) and the resulting instrumental melodies. It is subdivided taxonomically into ꞌau kia ka uuhi ("bamboos which one blows") and ꞌau kia ka ꞌui ("bamboos which one beats").
2. ꞌOꞌo: Designates the wooden slit drum (translated by Geerts (1970) as "wooden gong") and the specific repertoire of rhythms and messages transmitted through it. Because the drum is carved from wood rather than bamboo, it is defined in taxonomic contrast to ꞌau.
3. Nuuha: Encompasses all vocal music and songs. Morphologically, the term is a compound of nuu 'to sing/hum' + nominalising suffix -ha. It is categorised socially based on the sex of the performers (nuuha taꞌaa mane 'songs of men', versus nuuha taꞌaa keni 'songs of women').
4. Kiroha: Designates a specialised water-drumming game utilising aquatic acoustics. Like nuuha, it is formed via nominalisation of the verb kiro ('to beat the water with the hands'), an activity specifically recognised as a women's game.

== Bibliography ==
- Geerts, P. (1970), Wurm, S.A.; Laycock, D.C.; Voorhoeve, C.L. (eds.), 'Are'are Dictionary, Pacific Linguistics, vol. C-14, Canberra, ACT: Pacific Linguistics, Research School of Pacific and Asian Studies, Australian National University
- Naitoro, Kateřina (2013), A Sketch Grammar of ꞌAreꞌare: The Sound System and Morpho-syntax (Master of Arts thesis), University of Canterbury, hdl:10092/8085
- Zemp, Hugo (1978), "ꞌAreꞌare Classification of Musical Types and Instruments", Ethnomusicology, 22 (1): 37–67, doi:10.2307/851365, JSTOR 851365
