= ꞋAreꞌare people =

People from the south of the island of Malaita

Regions with significant populations
- Malaita (Solomon Islands): 18,000(1999)

Languages
- 'Are'are

Religion
- Ancestor Worship, Christianity

Related ethnic groups
- Polynesians

ꞌAreꞌare is the name of a people from the south of the island of Malaita, which is part of the Solomon Islands. Their language is the ꞌAreꞌare language, part of the Austronesian language family. In 1999, there were an estimated 18,000 speakers, up from about 8-9,000 in the 1970s.

== History ==
Prior to colonisation and subsequent independence, the ꞌAreꞌare occupied a much larger geographical area encompassing parts of Guadalcanal and Makira, as well as Malaita. This included the northern part of Makira known as Arosi and the eastern part of Guadalcanal known today as Marau Sound. In the past they lived in hamlets in the mountainous hinterland, or on the banks of lagoons in the southwest or the Mara Masika Strait (separating Malaita and South Malaita islands), but during colonization many coastal villages were established.

Traditionally, they practiced subsistence agriculture of taro, yams, and sweet potatoes, raised pigs and practiced fishing. During colonization, they were encouraged to export copra and raise cattle on a small scale.

== Politics ==
The southern and northern zones differ in political organization, with the south led by hereditary chieftains, while the north follows the self-made big man structure common in Melanesia. Both the hereditary and non-hereditary leaders are known as aaraha.

== Culture ==
The traditional religion was ancestor worship, but during colonization, Christianity made big inroads, and by the mid-1970s, at least half of the population was converted. Bible portions were first translated in 1957. About half belong to the South Seas Evangelical Church, and half to either the Catholic Church or the Anglican Church of the Province of Melanesia. The former do not permit traditional music, which is seen as related to the ancestral spirits, deemed "devils."

The ꞌAreꞌare are known for their complex panpipe music, which ethnomusicologist Hugo Zemp studied and filmed.
