= Sulufou =

Island in Solomon Islands

Coordinates: 8°27′S 160°51′E

Sulufou is an artificial island built on the reef in the Lau Lagoon on Malaita, Malaita Province in the nation of Solomon Islands. The road from Auki ends at Fouia wharf opposite the islands of Sulufou and Adaege in the Lau Lagoon.
