= Lau Lagoon =

Part of in Solomon Islands

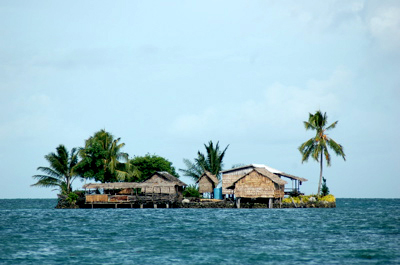
- Reef Island off North Malaita
- Interactive map of Lau Lagoon

Geography
- Location: Pacific Ocean
- Coordinates: 8°27′49″S 160°51′10″E
- Archipelago: Solomon Islands
- Area: 35 km^{2} (14 sq mi)
- Length: 35 km (21.7 mi)
- Width: 1 km (0.6 mi)

Administration
- Solomon Islands
- Province: Malaita Province
- Largest settlement: Auki (pop. 7,785)

Demographics
- Population: (2008)
- Ethnic groups: Melanesian 100%

Lau Lagoon is a part of Solomon Islands. It is located on the northeast coast of Malaita Island. The lagoon is more than 35 kilometers long and contains about 60 artificial islands built on the reef.

The Lau lagoon is home to a number of different villages. The largest village is Forau, which has around 1,500 permanent residents but can swell to three times that number during important local feasts or religious holidays (e.g. Christmas, Easter). The road from Auki, which passes through Malu'u, ends at Fouia wharf opposite the islands of Sulufou and Adagege in the Lau Lagoon. Funa'afou island, which is located near the edge of the Makwanu Passage, has about 200 inhabitants. The Lau Lagoon is otherwise only accessible by sea.

== History of the Lau people ==
The people of the Lau Lagoon call themselves wane i asi 'salt-water people' as distinct from wane i tolo 'bush people' who live in the interior of the island.

There was a history of conflict between the bush people and the salt-water people. The people of Lau Lagoon build islands on the reef as these provided protection against attack. These islands were formed literally one rock at a time. A family would take their canoe out to the reef which protects the lagoon and then dive for rocks, bring them to the surface and then return to the selected site and drop the rocks into the water. Living on the reef was also healthier, as the mosquitoes, which infest the coastal swamps, were not found on the reef islands. The Lau people continue to live on the reef islands.

== Agricultural and fishing practices ==
On the main land are the gardens in which the women grow swamp taro (Cyrtosperma merkusii), sweet potato, and yam (Dioscorea alata and Dioscorea esculenta). Supplementary crops include papaya, bananas, sugar cane, coconut and green vegetables.

The men fish in the lagoon or in the ocean. The Lau fisherman have a number of fishing techniques that they have developed to with particular reference to fish habits and habitats of the lagoon. The Lau fisherman recognise a tenure or ownership over areas of the lagoon and adjacent sea, which is divided into owned and free areas. The areas that have higher resource potential are those that are recognised as being owned and are inherited by patrilineal descent groups. The recognition of ownership allows the Lau fisherman to manage the marine reserve so as to maintain an ecologically sustainable use of the marine resources. The management of the marine resources also allows the Lau fisherman to fulfil the social and cultural goals of the community by ensuring a large catch to meet the needs of the Lau as well as providing a surplus which allows for the economic and social exchange between the Lau fishing community and the agriculturalists of the central areas of Malaita as the Lau are unable to produce sufficient starchy food crops and other vegetables from their own gardens. The fish stocks of the Lau Lagoon and sea areas was once plentiful, but it is becoming harder to come by due to pressure from international fisheries.

There are markets at which vegetables and fish are traded. These markets are located at either river sides a few kilometres upstream from the coast, or along the coast including in the Lau Lagoon. Markets appear to be located at territorial boundaries between wane i asi 'salt-water people' as distinct from wane i tolo 'Bush people'.

== Traditional practices ==
Malaitan shell-money, manufactured in the Langa Langa Lagoon, is the traditional currency used in Malaita and throughout the Solomon Islands. The money consists of small polished shell disks which are drilled and placed on strings. It can be used as payment for bride price, funeral feasts and compensation, with the shell-money having a cash equivalent value. It is also worn as an adornment and status symbol. The standard unit, known as the tafuliae, is several strands 1.5 m in length. The shell money is still produced by the people of Langa Langa Lagoon, but much is inherited, from father to son, and the old traditional strings are now rare.

The Lau Lagoon was known as a place where dolphin drive hunting occurred. The dolphins were used as a food source, with the teeth strung together to make belts that are also used as money. The people of Lau Lagoon have stopped hunting dolphin. The wane i asi 'salt-water people' of South Malaita have continued to hunt dolphin; In 2010, the villages of Fanalei, Walende, and Bitamae in South Malaita signed a MoU with the non-governmental organisation, Earth Island Institute, to stop hunting dolphin. However, in early 2013 the agreement broke down and some men in Fanalei resumed hunting.
