= South Malaita Island =

Island in Solomon Islands

Coordinates: 9.546°S 161.467°E

Native name: Maramasike
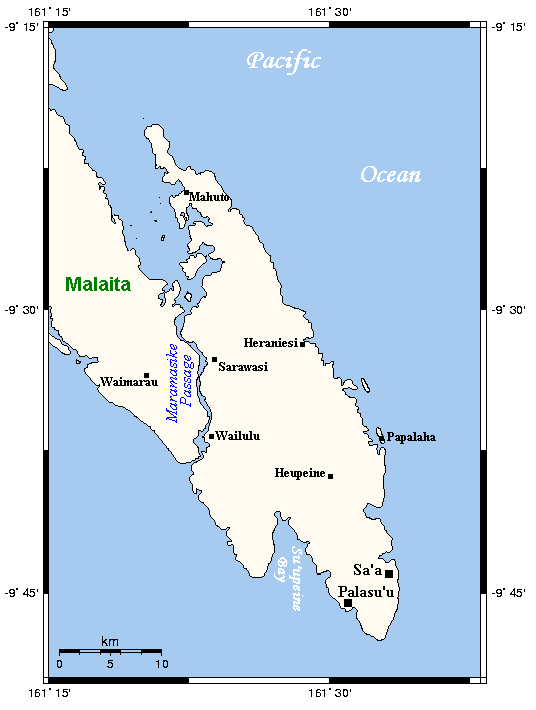

Geography
- Location: South Pacific Ocean
- Archipelago: Solomon Islands
- Area: 480.5 km^{2} (185.5 sq mi)
- Highest elevation: 518 m (1699 ft)

Administration
- Solomon Islands
- Province: Malaita

Demographics
- Population: 12,967 (2009)

South Malaita Island is the island at the southern tip of the larger island of Malaita in the eastern part of Solomon Islands. It is also known as Small Malaita and Maramasike for Areare speakers and Malamweimwei for more than 80% of the islanders. The island is referred to as Iola Raha. It is called "small" to distinguish it from the much larger sibling. It is part of Malaita Province. South Malaita came under effective control of the colonial administration after the Solomon Islands was declared a British Protectorate in 1893. During the colonial days, the island was divided by the colonial government and missionary establishments into the Asimeuri, Asimae, and Raroisu'u districts.

== First settlers ==
The history of Mwalamwaimwei began with early migrants who settled in the coastal zone and later moved to the highlands. A revolution in the highlands led residents to return to the coastal zone.

== Governance ==
The ruling chiefs inherit the chiefly bloodline and govern each Iola. The Ououinemauri is the elected high chief chosen to govern and administer the Council of Chiefs. The Iola are subdivided according to the tribes and clans across the island. Some Iolas have 2,3 or 4 chiefs.

=== Iolas ===
- Korutalau pwaine
- Kalapea
- Hoasiteimwane (Iola Raha)
- Lou aatowa
- Apuilalamoa
- Korutalaumwaimwei)
- Louatowa (Haitataemwane)
- Ueniusu (Ero ueniusu)
- Ououmatawa
- Uenisu Unu
- Roasi
- Aʼulutalau
- Iolairamo
- Hailadami

Other Iola in South Malaita are located within and share the boundary with others, organized by settlers.

== Language ==
South Malaita people follow 3 main languages:

- Saʼa is spoken by 75% of the population
- ꞌAreꞌare is spoken by 20% of the population.
- Lau is spoken by 5% of the people.
- Oroha

== Culture ==
Mwalamwaimwei culture is based on the chiefly system. The island is subdivided according to kingdom (Iola). The division of each kingdom was done by the council of chiefs (Alahaouou) during the pre-colonial era and later during Ma'asina Ruru Movement.

Residents identify with their extended families and with members of their clan and tribe.

The people practise patrilineal descent. Women played a much lesser role in governance; however, they are equally respected in society.

== Dolphin hunting ==
Dolphin are hunted in Malaita mainly for their meat and teeth, and also sometimes for live capture for dolphinaria. Dolphin hunting is practised by coastal communities around the world; the animals are herded with boats into a bay or onto a beach. A large-scale example is the Taiji dolphin drive hunt, made famous by the documentary film The Cove. The hunt on South Malaita Island is smaller in scale, and is almost exclusively practiced by the Walande and Fanelei peoples. The meat is shared equally between households. Dolphin teeth are used in jewelry and as currency.
