= Malaita =

Primary island of Malaita Province in Solomon Islands

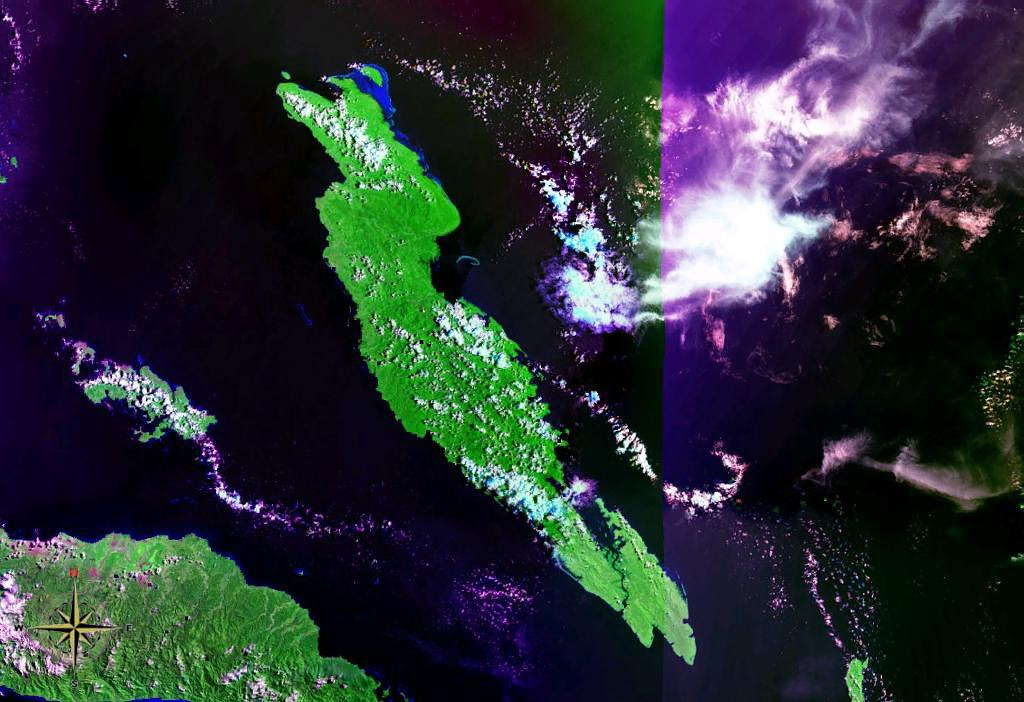
- Malaita Island seen from space (false colour)

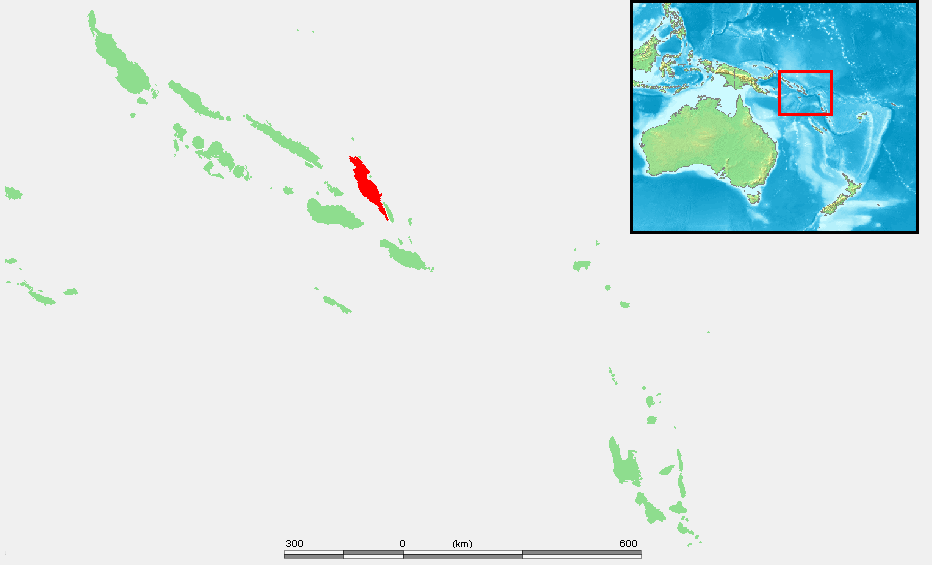

Geography
- Location: Pacific Ocean
- Coordinates: 9°01′03″S 160°57′14″E
- Archipelago: Solomon Islands
- Area: 4,307 km^{2} (1,663 sq mi)
- Highest elevation: 1,303 m (4275 ft)
- Highest point: Mount Kalourat

Administration
- Solomon Islands
- Province: Malaita
- Largest settlement: Auki (pop. 7,020 (2019))

Demographics
- Population: 172,740 (province) (2019)
- Pop. density: 32.5/km^{2} (84.2/sq mi)
- Ethnic groups: See § Demographics and culture

Malaita is the primary island of Malaita Province in Solomon Islands. Malaita is the second most populous island of the Solomon Islands after Guadalcanal, with a population of 172,740 as of 2019, or slightly less than a quarter of the entire national population. It is also the second largest island in the country by area, after Guadalcanal.

The largest city and provincial capital is Auki, on the northwest coast and is on the northern shore of the Langa Langa Lagoon. The people of the Langa Langa Lagoon and the Lau Lagoon on the northeast coast of Malaita call themselves wane i asi ‘salt-water people’ as distinct from wane i tolo ‘bush people’ who live in the interior of the island.

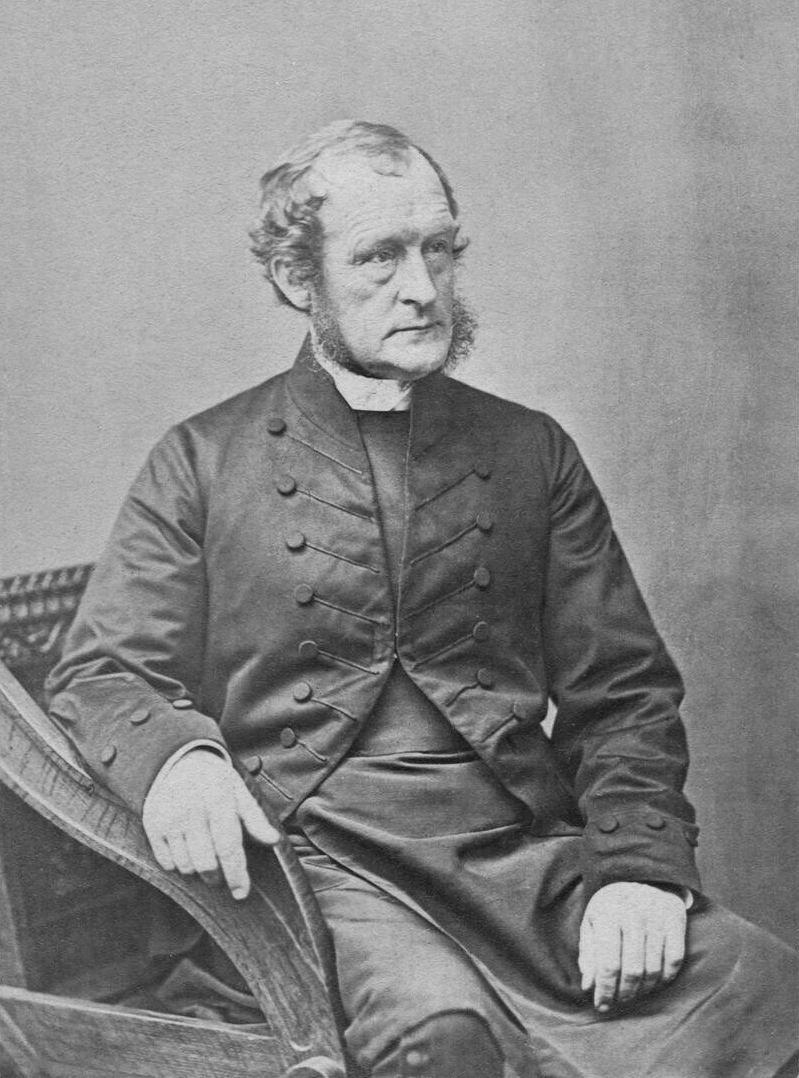
The bishop George Augustus Selwyn

South Malaita Island, also known as Small Malaita and Maramasike for ꞋAreꞌare speakers and Malamweimwei known to more than 80% of the islanders, is the island at the southern tip of the larger island of Malaita.

== Name ==
Most local names for the island are Mala, or its dialect variants Mara or Mwala. The name Malaita or Malayta appears in the logbook of the Spanish explorers who in the 16th century visited the islands, and claimed that to be the actual name. They first saw the island from Santa Isabel, where it is called Mala. One theory is that "ita" was added on, as the Bughotu word for up or east, or in this context "there." Bishop George Augustus Selwyn referred to it as Malanta in 1850. Mala was the name used under British control; now Malaita is used for official purposes. The name Big Malaita is also used to distinguish it from the smaller South Malaita Island.

== History ==
=== Early settlement and European discovery ===
Malaita was, along with the other Solomon Islands, settled by Austronesian speakers between 5000 and 3500 years ago; the earlier Papuan speakers are thought to have only reached the western Solomon Islands. However, Malaita has not been archaeologically examined, and a chronology of its prehistory is difficult to establish. In the traditional account of the Kwara'ae, their founding ancestor arrived about twenty generations ago, landed first on Guadalcanal, but followed a magical staff which led him on to the middle of Malaita, where he established their cultural norms. His descendants then dispersed to the lowland areas on the edges of the island.

First recorded sighting by Europeans of Malaita was by the Spaniard Álvaro de Mendaña on 11 April 1568. More precisely the sighting was due to a local voyage done by a small boat, in the accounts the brigantine Santiago, commanded by Maestre de Campo Pedro Ortega Valencia and having Hernán Gallego as pilot. In his account, Gallego chief pilot of Mendaña's expedition, establishes that they called the island Malaita after its native name and explored much of the coast, though not the north side. The Maramasiki Passage was thought to be a river. At one point they were greeted with war canoes and fired at with arrows; they retaliated with shots and killed and wounded some. However, after this discovery, the entire Solomon Islands chain was not found, and even its existence doubted, for two hundred years.

=== Labour trade and missions ===
After it was re-discovered in the late 18th century, Malaitans were subjected to harsh treatment from whaling boat crews and blackbirders (labour recruiters). Contact with outsiders also brought new opportunities for education. The first Malaitans to learn to read and write were Joseph Wate and Watehou, who accompanied Bishop John Coleridge Patteson to St John's College, Auckland.

From the 1870s to 1903 Malaitan men (and some women) comprised the largest number of Solomon Islander Kanaka workers in the indentured labour trade to Queensland, Australia and to Fiji. The 1870s were a time of illegal recruiting practices known as blackbirding. Malaitans are known to have volunteered as indentured labourers with some making their second trip to work on plantations, although the labour system remained exploitative. In 1901 the Commonwealth of Australia enacted the Pacific Island Labourers Act 1901 which facilitated the deportation of Pacific Islanders that was the precursor to the White Australia policy. However, many islanders remained and formed the South Sea Islander community of Australia. Many labourers that returned to Malaita had learnt to read and had become Christian. The skills of literacy and protest letters as to being deported from Australia was a precedent for the later Maasina Ruru movement.

Many of the earliest missionaries, both Catholic and Protestant, were killed, and this violent reputation survives in the geographic name of Cape Arsacides, the eastward bulge of the northern part of the island, meaning Cape of the Assassins. The cape was even mentioned in Herman Melville's epic novel Moby Dick by Ishmael, the novel's narrator. Ishmael talks of his friendship with the fictional Tranquo, King of Tranque. However, some of the earliest missionaries were Malaitans who had worked abroad, such as Peter Ambuofa, who was baptised at Bundaberg, Queensland in 1892, and gathered a Christian community around him when he returned in 1894. In response to his appeals, Florence Young led the first party of the Queensland Kanaka Mission (the ancestor of the SSEC) to the Solomons in 1904. Anglican and Catholic churches also missionized at this point, and set up schools in areas such as Malu'u. As the international labour trade slowed, an internal labour trade within the archipelago developed, and by the 1920s thousands of Malaitans worked on plantations on other islands.

=== Establishment of colonial power ===
At this time, there was no central power among the groups on Malaita, and there were numerous blood feuds, exacerbated by the introduction of Western guns, and steel tools which meant less time constraints for gardening. Around 1880, Kwaisulia, one of the chiefs, negotiated with labour recruiters to receive a supply of weapons in exchange of workers, based on a similar negotiation made by a chief on the Shortland Islands; this weapon supply gave the chiefs considerable power. However, labour recruitment was not always smooth. In 1886, the vessel Young Dick was attacked at Sinerango, Malaita, and most of its crew murdered. In 1886, Britain defined its area of interest in the Solomons, including Malaita, and central government control of Malaita began in 1893, when Captain Herbert Gibson, of HMS Curacoa, declared the southern Solomon Islands as a British Protectorate with the proclamation of the British Solomon Islands Protectorate, claiming to regulate the local warfare and unfair labour trade, although it coincided with the German acquisition of territories to the west and French interest in those to the east.

Auki was established as a government station in 1909, as headquarters of the administrative district of Malaita. The government began to pacify the island, registering or confiscating firearms, collecting a head tax, and breaking the power of unscrupulous war leaders. One important figure in the process was District Commissioner William R. Bell, who was killed in 1927 by a Kwaio, along with a cadet named Lillies and 13 Solomon Islanders in his charge. A massive punitive expedition, known as the Malaita massacre, ensued; at least 60 Kwaio were killed, nearly 200 detained in Tulagi (the protectorate capital), and many sacred sites and objects were destroyed or desecrated. Resentment about this incident continues, and in 1983 leaders from the Kwaio area council requested that the national government demand from the United Kingdom about $100 million in compensation for the incident. When the central government did not act on this request, the council encouraged a boycott of the 1986 national elections.

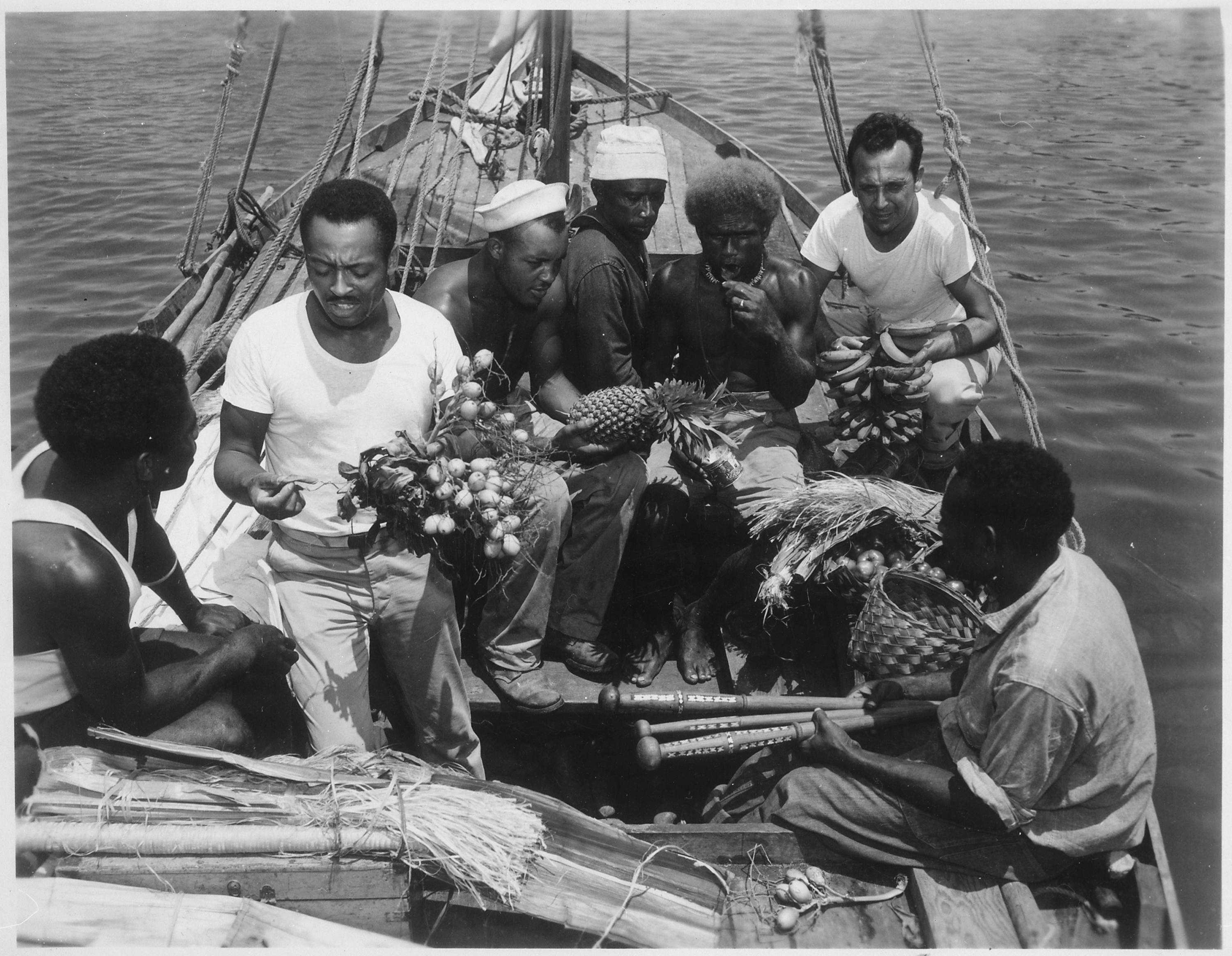
U.S. Navy Seabees trading with natives from Malaita, 23 September 1943

World War II, which played a major role in Solomons history, did not have a major impact upon Malaita. Auki became the temporary capital when Tulagi was seized by the Japanese, and it too was briefly raided by Japan, but little fighting happened on the island. Malaitans who fought in battalions, however, brought a new movement for self-determination known as Maasina Ruru (or "Marching Rule"), which spread quickly across the island. Participants united across traditional religious, ethnic, and clan lines, lived in fortified nontraditional villages, and refused to cooperate with the British. The organization of the movement on Malaita was considerable. The island was divided into nine districts, roughly along the lines of the government administrative districts, and leaders were selected for each district. Courts were set up, each led by a custom chief (alaha'ohu), who became powerful figures. The British initially treated the movement cautiously, even praised aspects of it, but when they found there could be no common ground between the government and the movement, retaliated firmly, with armed police patrols, insisting that the chiefs recant or be arrested. Some did recant, but in September 1947 most were tried in Honiara, charged with terrorism or robbery, and convicted to years of hard labour.

However, the movement continued underground, and new leaders renamed the organization the Federal Council. The High Commissioner visited Malaita to negotiate a settlement, and proposed the formation of the Malaita Council, which would have a president elected by members, though they would have to recognize the government's authority and agree to cooperate with their administrators. The council became the first installment of local government in the Solomon Islands, and its first president was Salana Ga'a. The establishment of the council reduced the tension on Malaita, although Maasina Rule elements did continue until at least 1955. The council was shown not to be simply a means of appeasement, but submitted nearly seventy resolutions and recommendations to the High Commissioner in its first two years of existence.

=== Post-independence ===
The Solomon Islands were granted independence in July 1978. The first prime minister was Peter Kenilorea from ꞋAreꞌare (Malaita). The provinces were re-organized in 1981, and Malaita became the main island of Malaita Province. Malaita remains the most populous island in the country, and continues to be a source for migrants, a role it played since the days of the labour trade. There are villages of Malaitans in many provinces, including eight "squatter" settlements that make up about 15 percent of the population of Honiara, on Guadalcanal.

Malaitans who had emigrated to Guadalcanal became a focus of the civil war which broke out in 1999, and the Malaita Eagle Force (MEF) was formed to protect their interest, both on Guadalcanal and on their home island. The organization of Regional Assistance Mission to Solomon Islands (RAMSI) has contributed to the infrastructure development of the island.

After the Solomon Islands switched diplomatic recognition to China from Taiwan in 2019, with a delegation led by prime minister Manasseh Sogavare being received with great hostility and the provincial government refusing to discuss the topics Sogavare had originally arrived to discuss, instead airing concerns over the diplomatic switch. Mass pro-Taiwan protests broke out throughout Malaita, and some protesters even demanded independence from the Solomon Islands, sparking concerns over the fragility of the government.

== Geography ==
Malaita is a thin island, about 164 kilometres (102 mi) long and 37 kilometres (23 mi) wide at its widest point. Its length is in a north-northwest-to-south-southeast direction, but local custom and official use generally rotate it to straight north–south orientation, and generally refer to the "east coast" or "northern end," when northeast or northwest would be more accurate. To the southwest is the Indispensable Strait, which separates it from Guadalcanal and the Florida Islands. To the northeast and east is open Pacific Ocean, except for the small Sikaiana, part of the province 212 kilometres (132 mi) northeast. To the northwest of the island is Santa Isabel Island. To the immediate southeast is South Malaita Island (also called Small Malaita or Maramasike), separated by the narrow Maramasike Passage. Beyond that is Makira, the southernmost large island in the Solomon archipelago.

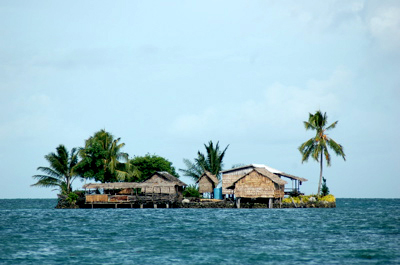
Reef Island off North Malaita

Malaita's climate is extremely wet. It is located in the Intertropical Convergence Zone ("Doldrums"), with its fickle weather patterns. The sun is at zenith over Malaita, and thus the effect is most pronounced, in November and February. Trade winds come during the Southern Hemisphere's winter, and from about April to August they blow from the southeast fairly steadily. During the summer, fringes of monsoon blow over the island. Because of the surrounding sea, air temperatures are fairly consistent, with a difference between daily highs and lows averaging to 7.6 °C (13.6 °F). However, across the year, the difference is much less; the mean daily temperature in the warmest month is only 1.9 °C (3.4 °F) warmer than that of the coolest. Rainfall is heavy and there is constant high humidity. The most common daily pattern follows an adiabatic process, with a calm, clear morning, followed by a breeze blowing in from higher pressures over the sea, culminating in a cloudy and drizzly afternoon. At night, the weather pattern reverses, and drizzle and heavy dew dissipate the cloud cover for the morning. Tropical cyclones are the only violent weather, but they can be destructive.

Like the other islands in the archipelago, Malaita is near the Andesite line and thus forms part of the Pacific Ring of Fire. Earthquakes are common on the island, but there is little evidence of current volcanic activity. The main structural feature of Malaita is the central ridge which runs along the length of the island, with flanking ridges and a few outlying hills. There is a central hilly country, between Auki and the Kwai Harbour, which separates the central ridge into northern and southern halves, the latter being somewhat longer. The northern ridge reaches a height of about 980 metres (3,200 ft), while the southern goes up to 1,300 metres (4,275 ft). Geologically, Malaita has a basaltic intrusive core, covered in most places by strata of sedimentary rock, especially limestone and chert, and littered with fossils. The limestone provides numerous sinkholes and caverns.

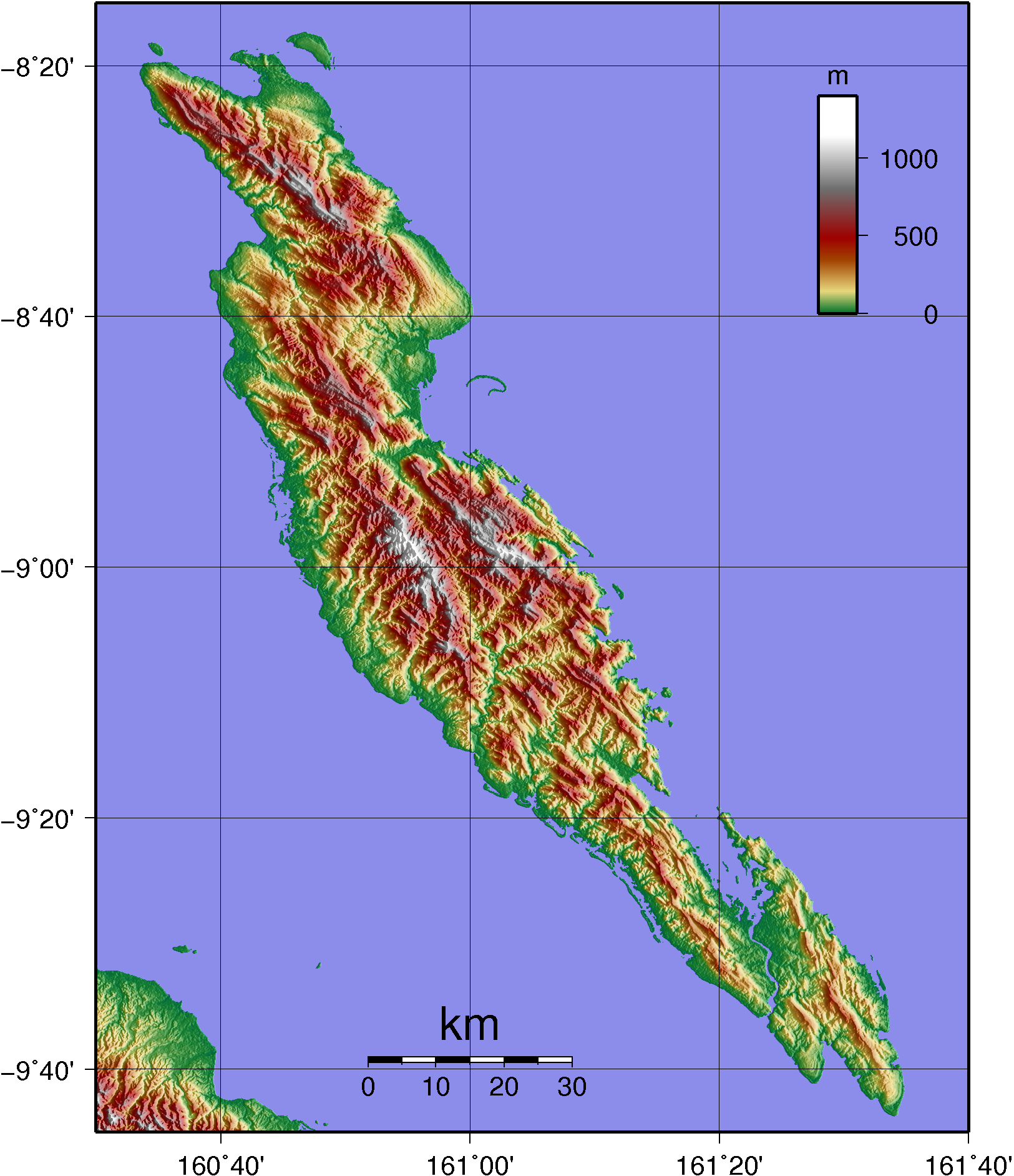
Topographical map of Malaita.

Malaitan hydrology includes thousands of small springs, rivulets, and streams, characteristic of a young drainage pattern. At higher altitudes waterfalls are common, and in some places canyons have been cut through the limestone. Nearer the coasts, rivers are slower and deeper, and form mangrove swamps of brackish water, along with alluvial deposits of gravel, sand, or mud. The coastal plain is very narrow. Inland soils are of three types, wet black, dry black, and red. The wet black soil, too poorly drained for most horticulture except taro, is found in valleys or at the foot of slopes. Dry black makes the best gardening sites. The red soil, probably laterite, does not absorb runoff and forms a hard crust, and is preferred for settlement sites.

== Environment ==
There are several vegetation zones based on altitude. Along the coast is either a rocky or sandy beach, where pandanus, coconuts, and vines predominate, or a swamp, supporting mangrove and sago palms. Terminalia grows in some drier areas. The lower slopes, up to about 2,500 feet (760 m), have a hardwood forest of banyans, Canarium, Indo-Malayan hardwoods, and, at higher altitudes, bamboo. In forested groves, there is relatively little undergrowth. In this zone is also the most intense human cultivation, which, when abandoned, a dense secondary forest grows, which is nearly impassably thick with shrubs and softwoods. Above about 2,500 feet (760 m) is a cloud forest, with a dense carpeting of mosses, lichens, and liverworts, with cycads as the dominant tall plant.

Like most Pacific islands, there are not large numbers of mammals. Apart from several species of bats, there are introduced species of pigs, cuscuses and rodents. There are also dugongs in the mangrove swamps, and sometimes dolphins in the lagoon.

Reptiles and amphibians are common as well, especially skinks and geckos. Crocodiles were once common, but have been so frequently hunted for their hides that they are nearly extinct. There are several venomous sea snakes and two species of venomous land snakes, in the elapid family. There are also numerous species of frogs of various sizes.

Fish and aquatic invertebrates are typical of the Indo-Pacific region. There are a few species of freshwater fish (including mudskippers and several other species of teleost fish), mangrove crabs and coconut crabs. On land, centipedes, scorpions, spiders, and especially insects are very common. All common orders of insects are represented, including some spectacular butterflies. The common Anopheles mosquito ensures that vivax malaria is endemic.

Malaitans once believed in anthropoid apes that lived in the centre of the island, which are said to be 4.5 to 5 feet (1.4 to 1.5 m) tall and come in troops to raid banana plantations.

There are a great number and variety of birds. Almost every family of avifauna were found in Ernst Mayr's 1931 survey. Several species of parrots, cockatoos, and owls are kept as pets. Some bird species are endemic to Malaita.

=== Important Bird Area ===
The Malaita Highlands form a site that has been identified by BirdLife International as an Important Bird Area (IBA) because it supports populations of threatened or endemic bird species. At 58,379 ha, it encompasses the highest peak of the island and the surrounding montane and lowland forest. Significant birds for which the site was identified include metallic pigeons, chestnut-bellied imperial pigeons, pale mountain pigeons, duchess lorikeets and the endemic red-vested myzomelas, Malaita fantails and Malaita white-eyes. Potential threats to the site include logging and human population growth.

=== Dolphin hunting ===
According to Malaitian oral history, a Polynesian woman named Barafaifu introduced dolphin drive hunting from Ontong Java Atoll; she settled in Fanalei village in South Malaita as it was the place for hunting. Dolphin hunting ceased in the mid-19th century, possibly because of the influence of Christian missionaries. However, in 1948 it was revived at settlements on several islands, including Fanalei, Walande (10 km to the north), Ata'a, Felasubua, Sulufou (in the Lau Lagoon) and at Mbita'ama harbour. In most of these communities, the hunt had ceased again by 2004. However, Fanalei in South Malaita remained the preeminent dolphin hunting village.

The dolphins are hunted as food, for their teeth, and for live export. The teeth of certain species have a value for trade, brideprice ceremonial traditions, funeral feasts, and compensation. The teeth of melon-headed whale were traditionally the most desirable; however, they were over-hunted and became locally rare. The other species hunted are spinner dolphin and the pantropical spotted dolphin. While Indo-Pacific bottlenose dolphin (Tursiops aduncus) have been captured for live export, the bottlenose dolphin is not hunted as the teeth are not considered to have any value.

In recent years only villages on South Malaita Island have continued to hunt dolphin. In 2010, the villages of Fanalei, Walende, and Bitamae signed a memorandum of agreement with the non-governmental organization, Earth Island Institute, to stop hunting dolphin. However, in early 2013 the agreement broke down and some men in Fanalei resumed hunting. The hunting of dolphin continued in early 2014. Researchers from the South Pacific Whale Research Consortium, the Solomon Islands Ministry of Fisheries and Marine Resources, and Oregon State University’s Marine Mammal Institute have concluded that hunters from the village of Fanalei in the Solomon Islands have killed more than 1,600 dolphins in 2013, included at least 1,500 pantropical spotted dolphins, 159 spinner dolphins and 15 bottlenose dolphins. The total number killed during the period 1976–2013 was more than 15,400. The price at which dolphin teeth are traded in Malaita rose from the equivalent of 18c in 2004 to about 90c in 2013.

== Demographics and culture ==
Malaitan child

A Malaitan Chief.

Malaitans are of a varying phenotype. The skin varies from rich chocolate to tawny, most clearly darker than Polynesians, but not generally as dark as the peoples of Bougainville or the western Solomons, whom Malaitans refer to as "black men". Most have dark brown or black bushy hair, but it varies in colour from reddish blond, yellow to whitish blond, to ebony black, and in texture from frizzled to merely wavy. Tourists often mistakenly believe the blond hair of Malaitans is bleached by peroxide, but this is not so; the blond or reddish hair colour is quite natural. Male-pattern baldness is widespread, but not as common as among Europeans. Most have smooth skin, but some grow hair on their arms, legs, and chest, and have beards. Most Malaitans are shorter than average Europeans, though not as short as Negritos. Relatively robust physiques are more common among coastal populations, while people from higher altitudes tend to be leaner.

=== Languages and ethnic groups ===
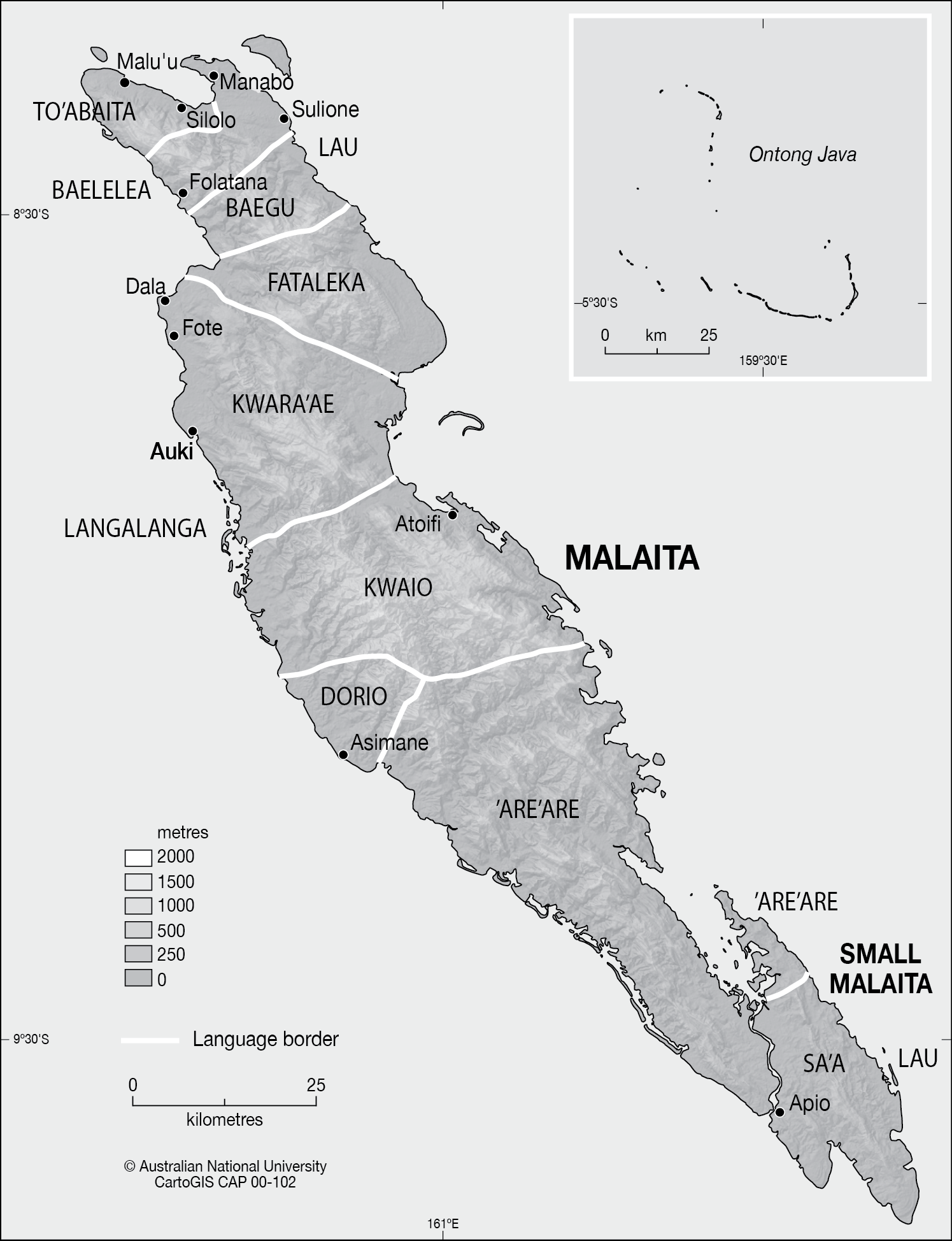
Language map of Malaita, with Small Malaita

Malaitans speak a variety of languages within the Malaitan language family, a subbranch of the Malayo-Polynesian languages. The diversity is not as great as once thought, and some of the groups are mutually intelligible. Some of the exaggeration in the number of languages may be due to the inappropriateness of lexicostatistical techniques and glottochronological analysis, given the widespread use of word taboo and metathesis as word play. According to Harold M. Ross, from north to south along the island's axis, the linguistic groups are roughly the Northern Malaita languages (more properly a collection of dialects without a standard name, generally To'abaita, Baelelea, Baegu, Fataleka, and Lau), Kwara'e in the hilly area between the ridges, Kwaio in about the geographic centre of the island, and ꞋAreꞌare to the south. Each of these spreads across the width of the island. In addition, there is the Langalanga in a lagoon on the west coast between the Kwara'ae and Kwaio regions, and Kwarekwareo on the western coast between the Kwaio and ꞋAreꞌare regions, which may be a dialect of Kwaio. Sa'a, spoken on South Malaita, is also a member of the family. Mutual intelligibility is also aided by the large degree of trade and intermarriage among the groups.

The peoples of Malaita share many aspects of their culture, although they are generally divided into ethnic groups along linguistic lines. In pre-colonial times, settlements were small and moved frequently. Both agnatic descent (patrilineal lines from a founding ancestor) and cognatic descent (through links of outmarrying women) are important. These lineages determine rights of residence and land use in a complex way. In the northern area, local descent groups, united in ritual hierarchies, are largely autonomous, but conceptualize their relationship as a phratry in a manner similar to certain groups in highland New Guinea. In the central area, local descent groups are fully autonomous, though still linked by ritual. In the south, the ꞋAreꞌare people developed a more hierarchical organization and more outward orientation, a cultural tradition that reaches its peak on the hereditary chiefs and rituals of Small Malaita to the south. One exception to these generalizations are cultures which have migrated in more recent times, such as the northern Lau, who settled in several seaside areas (and offshore islands) in southern Malaita about 200 years ago, and with whom there has been little cultural exchange.

=== Religion ===
The traditional religion of the island is ancestor worship. In one oral tradition, the earliest residents knew the name of the creator, but thought his name was so holy that they did not want to tell their children. Instead, they instructed their children to address their requests to their ancestors, who would be their mediators. In some parts of Malaita the high god responsible for creation, who has now retired from active work, is known as Agalimae ("the god of the universe"). Congregations of local descent groups propitiate their ancestors at shrines, led by ritual officiants (fataabu in northern Malaita). On Malaita, many shrines have been preserved, not only for their sanctity but also because they serve as territorial markers that can resolve land disputes.

With European contact, Catholics and Anglicans spread their gospels, and many missionaries were killed. The Protestant South Seas Evangelical Mission (SSEM, now known as the South Seas Evangelical Church, SSEC), originally based in Queensland, made considerable inroads by following the imported workers home to their native islands. More recently, Jehovah's Witnesses and the Seventh-day Adventist Church have converted many. Many Malaitans have been active in the Solomon Islands Christian Association, a national inter-denominational organization that set a precedent for cooperation during the period of independence. The Kwaio people have been the most resistant to Christianity.

=== Economy ===
For the most part, the Malaitans survive by subsistence agriculture, with taro and sweet potatoes as the most important crops. After the establishment of government control, a plantation was established on the west coast, near Baunani. However, many Malaitans work on plantations on other islands in the archipelago. For most, working on plantations is the only way to buy prestigious Western goods. Retail trade was largely conducted by Chinese merchants, with headquarters in Honiara. Goods are dispatched to remote locations on the island, where they are sometimes purchased by middlemen who keep "stores" (usually of suitcase size) in remote places.

=== Arts ===
The Malaitans are famous for their music and dance, which are sometimes associated with rituals. Several of the groups, including the ꞋAreꞌare, famous for their panpipe ensembles, are among SSEC members whose traditional music is no longer performed for religious reasons. Secular dancing is similar to widespread patterns in the Solomons, following patterns learned from plantation labour gangs or moves learned at the cinema in Honiara. Sacred dances follow strict formal patterns, and incorporate panpipers in the group. Some dances represent traditional activities, such as the tue tue dance, about fishing, which depict movements of the boat and fish, and the birds overhead.

Malaitan shell-money, manufactured in the Langalanga lagoon, is the traditional currency, and was used throughout the Solomon Islands, as far as Bougainville. The money consists of small polished shell disks which are drilled and placed on strings. It can be used as payment for brideprice, funeral feasts and compensation, as well ordinary purposes as a cash equivalent. It is also worn as an adornment and status symbol. The standard unit, known as the tafuliae, is several strands 1.5 m in length. Previously the money was also manufactured on Makira and Guadalcanal. It is still produced on Malaita, but much is inherited, from father to son, and the old traditional strings are now rare. Porpoise teeth are also used as money, often woven into belts.

== Notable people ==
- Rexford Orotaloa, novelist
