= 2000 Solomon Islands coup d'état =

- Map of the Solomon Islands
Date	5 June 2000
Location	Solomon Islands
Result	Overthrow of Prime Minister Bartholomew Ulufa'alu

Belligerents
Isatabu Freedom Movement	Malaita Eagle Force	Royal Solomon Islands Police Force

Commanders and leaders
Andrew Te'e	Jimmy 'Rasta' Lusibaea's	Rererangi Hika

On 5 June 2000, a coup d'état occurred in Solomon Islands, in the capital of Honiara, in which the prime minister, Bartholomew Ulufa'alu, was taken hostage by militants of the Malaita Eagle Force. The event came as a result of longstanding ethnic tensions between the province that saw a rise in armed political groups from the late 1990s.

== Background ==
The Solomon Islands archipelago, which covers the current nation state of Solomon Islands and parts of Papua New Guinea, has a long history with Western colonisation, with the first European explorer, Álvaro de Mendaña de Neira, reaching the islands in 1568. From as early as 1870, the people of the Solomon Islands archipelago were captured and exploited for slave labour in the sugar plantations of Queensland and Fiji. The islands were also divided between Germany and Britain for self interests in 1886, however, the Solomon Islands were not formally colonised until 1893, by the British government. In the eighty five years of British occupation, the British set up a number of plantations.

Solomon Islands gained independence as a Commonwealth realm in 1978. In 1997, Bartholomew Ulufa'alu succeeded Solomon Mamaloni, as Prime Minister of Solomon Islands. Part of Ulufa’alu’s campaign included aims to implement public service and finance reforms to end government corruption and mismanagement, following the resignation of his predecessor Solomon Mamaloni, after accusations of corruption. Ulufa’alu’s restructuring of the civil service, including cutting more than five hundred jobs, gained him support from foreign banks. In mid 1998, Ulufa’alu’s government survived a vote of no confidence after the defection of six parliamentarians.

From 1970 to 1999, the population of Solomon Islands had grown by 254%, with Malaita making up 30% of the nation's population in 1999, as well as Guadalcanal and Western Province making up 15% each. During the period of the 1990s, logging was the country's biggest export, with the Western Province providing 51% of all log exports, Guadalcanal between 10-12% and Malaita just 6%. Poorly distributed resources between the provinces, led to a dramatic difference between population and export revenue. It was this uneven distribution that led to a migration crisis in the capital of Hoinara, as people searched for work from the early 1980s onwards. Violence escalated in 1998, due to the peoples dismay at how the government distributed export revenue and escalating domestic cultural differences between the provinces.

the flag of Solomon Islands

=== State of emergency ===
On 17 June 1999, the government declared a state of emergency which lasted four months. The state of emergency was issued due to the escalation of violence between armed political groups near the capital, Honiara. Also at this time, ethnic violence was starting to arise in the Western Province, with a number of houses being burnt down in New Georgia. This ethnic violence in the Western Province was also caused by the internal migration by the Malaitans, and the local populations dislike of their migration. In June 1999, the Premier of Western Province, Clement Base, voiced his disdain for the Malaitan settlers on national radio. This event lead to a meeting with the Western members of National Parliament in Honiara, where attendees publicly apologised for Base’s statements, out of fear it would result in an escalation of fighting. The meeting ended with the proposal of the Munda Accord, which aimed to settle ethnic violence and tension in the region. As well as the Munda accord, the signing of the Honiara Peace Accord, called for the political groups to disarm in Honiara, concluding the period of violence. The Ulufa’alu government during this period limited press reporting and freedom of association, and granted more power to the police force.

==== Peace accords ====
The Honiara Peace Accord meeting was held on 28 June 1999, in Honiara. The Accord was brokered by the Commonwealth Special Envoy, Sitiveni Rabuka, and was signed by members of the National and Provincial Governments and the Opposition. The Accord included nine points of interest, which highlighted ethnic tensions since independence in 1978, and ways to minimize more ethnic violence.

The Munda Accord was focused on the Western Province, and drawn up in July 1999. The Accord expressed that the Western Province wanted to restrict the movement of unemployed vagrants, into their province. This in addition to setting down stringent measures against its own people who allow their land to be settled by outsiders and direct allocation of land other than for the purpose of public interest must be stopped outright in Western Province. Building on the Munda Accord, the Premiers of Malaita and Western Provinces co-signed a Communique: Western Province Ethnic Tension in August 1999.

As well as the Communique signed in August 1999, a second one was formed in April 2000. The Communique was centered around the Western Province’s response to the Provincial Government Decentralisation Bill proposed in 1999, due to go to parliament in April 2000. The Communique aimed to allow the Western Province more independence both economically and politically. It stated that the Western Province wanted:

- A substantial portion of the revenue generated in the Western Province to be retained in the Province and relevant legislation be amended accordingly,
- Security issues to be addressed immediately in line with the Munda Accord,
- The National Government with immediate effect prepare the Province for the attainment of State Government by 2005,
- That the government should reconsider the implementation of the proposed Provincial Government Bill
- The National Government immediately transfers all alienated land and other government assets to the government and people of Western Province.

=== Isatabu Freedom Movement ===
In late 1998, the Isatabu Freedom Movement was established and started a campaign of threats against Malaitan migrants in Guadalcanal. The Movement claimed indigenous rights to the land on Guadalcanal and wanted the malaitans to move out of the capital. The Isatabu Freedom Movement drove an estimated 20,000 people from their homes, as well as injury many Malatian people. The Isatabu Freedom Movement had driven Malaitan migrants to the capital, Honiara, and surrounded the city with a series of roadblocks. Because of these roadblocks, The Isatabu Freedom Movement controlled the rural areas of Guadalcanal, where most indigenous Guadalcanal had fled to, and proceeded to join the movement.

=== Malaita Eagle Force ===
The Malaita Eagle Force emerged in 1999, as a response to hostile behaviour from the population of Guadalcanal in response to the Malaitian migration to the island. The group based themselves in Honiara and fought for Malaitan interests in Honiara . The Malaitan group established themselves to compete with the Guadalcanal Isatabu Freedom Movement. It was the Malaita Eagle Force group that were responsible for the coup d’état on June 5 2000.

=== Ethnic tensions in Western Province ===
While the Malaita Eagle Force and Isatabu Freedom Movement were concentrated on the island of Guadalcanal, in Western Province notices appeared around Gizo, Munda and Noro demanding Malaitans to leave the island, and had three weeks to do so. The notices were signed by a group called ‘Black Shark’, who were an armed combatant group from Bougainville, yet it was unclear whether they were indeed behind the notices. The group in the past had burnt down Malaitan settlements, where eight hundred to one thousand Malaitans resided and were known to be hostile towards Malaitan immigrants. Confusion spread as to who was behind the attacks, and whether it was in fact the Black Shark group from Bougainvlle or an impersonator, and police were dispatched to largely populated areas across the island.

== Coup d'état ==
The Malaita Eagle Force staged a coup d'état on 5 June 2000. The event occurred as a result of the group's view that the government had failed to properly address the ethnic crisis. It was on 5 June that Andrew Nori and the Malaita Eagle Force overran Honiara and took the Prime Minister hostage at gunpoint. Once hostage, the Malaita Eagle Force forced the Prime Minister, Bartholomew Ulufa'alu, to resign and declared war on the Isatabu Freedom Movement. He was given two days to announce his resignation, but this was later extended until the meeting of Parliament that was held the following Thursday. The Malaita Eagle Force at this time, started an offensive against the Isatabu Freedom Movement, driving the road blocks further from the city. During this time, the Malaita Eagle Force controlled the capital and kept the Prime Minister under heavy guard. On June 30, the parliament elected a new Prime Minister, Manasseh Sogavare, who was the leader of the opposition.

== Aftermath ==
=== Economic consequences ===
Throughout the building ethnic tension in 2000, the Solomon Islands economy was negatively affected. The nation's gross domestic product decreased by fourteen percent in 2000. It is also believed that by October 2000, more than eight thousand jobs had been lost. The capitol, Honiara, where most of the fighting and coup d’etat took place, lost a lot of workers because of the violence and Malaitan migration back to Malaita. Due to Isatabu Freedom Movement raids on Guadalcanal’s mine, Gold Ridge, it closed down, losing a major contributor to foreign money. As well as the mine, logging exports fell by thirteen percent in 2000, because of the roadblocks set up by the Malaita Eagle Force and Isatabu Freedom Movement. On Guadalcanal, plantations were also destroyed and equipment was stolen, as well as livestock being killed for food by soldiers from the Isatabu Freedom Movement. Houses, buildings and infrastructure were destroyed, including a water station at Kongulae, leaving Honiara without water from that source. As well as the domestic economy, the nation was unable to trade internationally for the likes of oil and gas due to insufficient funds at the Central Bank.

=== Peace talks ===
On 15 October 2000, peace talks were held in Townsville in Australia to begin a process of reconciliation, resulting in the Townsville Peace Agreement. The talks hosted the Solomon Islands government, the Malaita Eagle Force, the Isatabu Freedom Movement, the Malaita Provincial Government and the Guadalcanal Provincial Government. The Townsville Peace Agreement concluded that Solomon Islands was to introduce a form of government that would give more autonomy to the provinces. Members, leaders, police and civilian advisors that were associated with the Malaita Eagle Force and the Isatabu Freedom Movement who participated in military operations during the course of the ethnic crisis, up until October 15 were granted amnesty. This amnesty excludes people that did not give up firearms, ammunition or stolen property that were to be surrendered following the Townsville Peace Agreement, which stated that both the Malaita Eagle Force and the Isatabu Freedom Movement had to surrender all weapons in their possession. The Agreement also declared that there was to be a free movement of People and Services throughout the Solomon Islands, following the peace talks.

Following the Townsville Peace Agreement in October 2000, the Solomon Islands government held a conference in Buala in November that was attended by the nation’s Premiers. The conference aimed to discuss legal and administrative changes to support a government that would increase the independence of the provinces. They concluded that the national government was to adopt a homegrown state system of government where each respective province should become a State with its own State Constitution. The system of state government was proposed and enacted in the Constitution Amendment Bill in July 2001. Changes to this Bill continued until 2006.

=== Disarmament process ===
In November 2000, Australia and New Zealand combined sent forty seven monitors, that were dispersed between Guadalcanal and Malaita. There were four teams of monitors in Guadalcanal and one in Malaita. They arrived to oversee the disarmament process after the coup d’etat, in which the Malaita Eagle Force and Isatabu Freedom Movement were ordered to hand back stolen weaponry, in accordance with the Townsville Peace Talks. The monitors controlled eight storage containers which were to hold the equipment collected in the process, all were under surveillance and equipped with padlocks. By July 2001, 1,131 firearms and 3,600 rounds of ammunition had been surrendered by both the Malaita Eagle Force and the Isatabu Freedom Movement.
