= Geve =

Geve is a surname. Notable people with the surname include:

- Augustine Geve (died 2002), Solomon Islands priest and politician
- Nicolaus Georg Geve (1712–1789), Danish painter and illustrator
- Thomas Geve (1929–2024), German engineer
