= 2026 in the Solomon Islands =

- Decades: 2000s; 2010s; 2020s
- See also: Other events of 2026; Timeline of Solomon history

Events in the year 2026 in the Solomon Islands.

== Incumbents ==
- Monarch: Charles III
- Governor-General: David Tiva Kapu
- Prime Minister: Matthew Wale

== Events ==
- 1 April – Cyclone Maila impacts the Solomon Islands.
- 7 May – Prime Minister Jeremiah Manele loses a no-confidence motion vote at the National Parliament.
- 15 May – Matthew Wale is elected by the National Parliament as Prime Minister.
- 31 July – The Solomon Islands signs a shiprider agreement with the United States. It permits law enforcement officers from the Solomon Islands to access United States Coast Guard ships.
- 20 August – The Solomon Islands National Roadmap for Malaria Elimination is launched, naming 2038 as its goal year for becoming malaria-free.
- 25 August – The Ministry of National Planning and Development Coordination (MNPDC) announces the creation of a new unit, the Resource Mobilisation Unit (RMU). It is planned to assist the MNPDC in financial and developmental affairs, as well as implement MNPDC policies, while working with the Ministry of Finance and Treasury.

== Holidays ==
- 1 January – New Year's Day
- 3 April – Good Friday
- 5 April – Easter Saturday
- 6 April – Easter Monday
- 7 July – Independence Day
- 25 December – Christmas Day
- 26 December – National Day of Thanksgiving

== Deaths ==
- 19 September – Nathaniel Waena, 80, politician, MP (1984–2004) and governor-general (2004–2009).
