= 2022 in the Solomon Islands =

- Decades: 2000s; 2010s; 2020s
- See also: Other events of 2022; Timeline of Solomon history

Events in the year 2022 in the Solomon Islands.

== Incumbents ==
- Monarch: Elizabeth II (until 8 September); then Charles III
- Governor-General: David Vunagi
- Prime Minister: Manasseh Sogavare

== Events ==
Ongoing — COVID-19 pandemic in Solomon Islands

- 4 January – A search continues for 14 people missing at sea in the Solomon Islands, after their boat failed to reach the Shortland Islands. Efforts were called off yesterday due to bad weather.
- 31 March – Micronesian president David Panuelo urges Solomon Islands to not sign a security pact with China, citing "grave security concerns" and arguing that the Pacific islands would be "the epicenter of major confrontation" between major powers.
- 18 April – United States officials plan to travel to Solomon Islands due to concerns that the country is making a security pact with China. The U.S. fears the proposed agreement could lead to Chinese troops being deployed to Solomon Islands.
- 19 April – The foreign ministers of the People's Republic of China and Solomon Islands sign a security pact.
- 30 August – The United States Embassy in Canberra says that the government of Solomon Islands will place a moratorium on US Navy ships entering its ports amid deteriorating relations between the two countries.
- 8 September – The parliament of Solomon Islands votes to delay the next general election amid objections by opposition parties, who accuse Prime Minister Manasseh Sogavare of a "power grab".
- 8 September – Accession of Charles III as King of Solomon Islands following the death of Queen Elizabeth II.
- 12 September – Charles III is officially proclaimed King of Solomon Islands by the Governor-General in Honiara.
- 12 September – A national holiday occurs in Solomon Islands to mourn the passing of Elizabeth II, Queen of Solomon Islands.
- 14 September – A memorial church service takes place at the Saint Barnabas Anglican Cathedral on to celebrate the life and reign of Queen Elizabeth II.
- 19 September – The Governor-General attends the funeral of Queen Elizabeth II in London.

== Deaths ==
- 7 August– Ezekiel Alebua, 75, politician, prime minister (1986–1989) and MP (1980–1987) (born 1947)
- 8 September – Elizabeth II, 96, Queen of Solomon Islands since 1978 (born 1926)
