= 2020 in the Solomon Islands =

- Decades: 2000s; 2010s; 2020s
- See also: Other events of 2020; Timeline of Solomon history

The following lists events that happened during 2020 in the Solomon Islands.

== Incumbents ==
- Monarch: Elizabeth II
- Governor-General: David Vunagi
- Prime Minister: Manasseh Sogavare

== Events ==
Ongoing – COVID-19 pandemic in Oceania

=== January ===
- 22 January – Police launch search operations to find nine people from a capsized boat near Isabel Province. Five men, two women and two children were on board.
- 31 January – The Royal Solomon Islands Police Force stop searching for nine people who disappeared at sea on 15 January when their boat capsized. Five men, two women and two children are now presumed dead.

=== April ===
- 3 April – Twenty-seven people died in the country after their boat capsized during Cyclone Harold.
- 33 April – Despite having no cases, the government stepped up checks on incoming visitors and introduced restrictions on visitors who have visited countries deemed high risk.

=== March ===
- 14 March – The country banned all travelers from China, South Korea and Japan. Health minister Dickson Mua also said that the country had suspended flights to Brisbane, Australia, and banned all civil servants from overseas travel in order to contain COVID-19.
- 25 March – The country declared a state of emergency due to COVID-19.
- 27 March – Prime Minister Manasseh Sogavare suspended all flights into the country, and declared a precautionary state of emergency in Honiara, by which most entertainment venues would be closed (churches are exempt from the order).
- 31 March – Franco Rodie, the permanent secretary of the Ministry of Education and Human Resources Development, ordered the closure of all schools in the country.

=== September ===
- 1 September – Malaita Province Premier Daniel Suidani announces an independence referendum to potentially secede from the Solomon Islands due to growing tensions over the central government's diplomatic switch to China and a recent incident where Taiwanese medical supplies were seized by the government.
- 7 September – The government of Solomon Islands says that a proposed independence referendum in Malaita Province is illegal. Daniel Suidani, the provincial premier of Malaita, proposed the referendum in protest to the decision by the central government to switch recognition from Taiwan to China last year.
- 20 September – Two Norwegian People's Aid employees are killed in an explosion in a residential area of Honiara, Solomon Islands, while clearing unexploded ordnance left over from the Pacific War of World War II.
