= Andrew Nori =

Solomon Islands politician (1952–2013)

The Right Honourable Andrew Nori MP

Minister of Finance of the Solomon Islands
- In office June 1993 – September 1994
- Prime Minister: Francis Billy Hilly
- Preceded by: Christopher Abe
- Succeeded by: Christopher Abe

Minister for Home Affairs and Provincial Government
- In office November 1984 – 1988
- Prime Minister: Sir Peter Kenilorea

Member of Parliament for West 'Are'are
- In office 24 October 1984 – 6 August 1997
- Preceded by: Alfred Aihunu
- Succeeded by: Alfred Hairiu

Personal details
- Born: 1952 Honiara, Solomon Islands
- Died: 9 July 2013 (aged 60–61) Honiara
- Party: Nationalist Front for Progress

Andrew Nori (1952 – 9 July 2013) was a Solomon Islands lawyer and politician, arguably best known for his role in the ethnic conflict on Guadalcanal in the late 1990s and early 2000s.

His father, Nori Nono'oohimae, was one of the founders of the Maasina Ruru movement of civil disobedience against British colonial rule, in the 1940s.

A barrister by profession, Andrew Nori was "one of the first Solomon Islanders to qualify as a lawyer", and eventually became president of the Solomon Islands bar association.

He began his political career when he was elected to the National Parliament in the 1984 general election, as MP for the West 'Are'are constituency. Prime Minister Sir Peter Kenilorea appointed him Minister for Home Affairs and Provincial Government, a position which he held for four years. He was re-elected in 1989, and, as head of the Nationalist Front for Progress, was for a time appointed Leader of the Official Opposition to Prime Minister Solomon Mamaloni's government. Re-elected to Parliament for a third term in 1993, he was appointed Minister for Finance in Prime Minister Francis Billy Hilly's government. In September 1994, he resigned in the face of reports that over A$70,000 had been transferred to his personal bank account from "an unnamed overseas source". He stated that he had "listed the amount with the relevant leadership code commission", but was stepping down "until his name was cleared". He did not regain his Cabinet position, and was defeated in his bid to retain his Parliament seat in the 1997 general election. This marked the end of his career in national politics.

When migrants from Malaita in Guadalcanal began to be subject to violence from local ethnic militant groups in late 1999, and the armed Malaita Eagle Force was formed to defend their interests, Nori, himself a Malaitan, rapidly emerged as the "leader" or "spokesman" of the Eagle Force.

On 5 June 2000, he led the Eagle Force into a coup d'état against Prime Minister Bartholomew Ulufa'alu, taking him hostage at gunpoint and demanding that he resign. Nori accused Ulufa'alu of not having prevented an escalation in the ethnic conflicts on Guadalcanal. The Eagle Force was temporarily described as "in control" of the capital city, Honiara. Nori told the Australian media he had led the coup because there was "a need for an immediate change in leadership and for the issues relating to peace to be focussed on more seriously and for a more efficient method and mechanism to be established to attend to peace issues and on the negotiation between the warring parties on Guadalcanal". The coup rapidly led to the arrival of a Commonwealth Ministerial Action Group delegation, which was welcomed by Nori, who expressed his hope that it would result in peace being brokered between the ethnic factions. Parliament voted to elect Manasseh Sogavare to the premiership, replacing Ulufa'alu, and the ethnic conflicts ceased for the most part with the Townsville Peace Agreement in October.

In September 2000, the Pacific Media Watch accused Nori of having threatened journalist Duran Angiki and his family over an allegedly incorrect report published by the latter on Nori.

In 2009, still practicing as a lawyer, Nori made headlines again by publicly criticising the Political Parties Registration and Administration Bill, saying it would entrench rather than resolve political instability in the country.

As of early 2011, he was working as a consultant to the Customary Land Reform Unit, researching rules of customary land ownership throughout the country with an aim towards a government policy "to codify customary land laws and have them elevated to statutory status". In 2012, he was elected president of the National Olympic Committee of Solomon Islands.

He died in hospital in Honiara on 9 July 2013, "after a long illness". In its obituary, the newspaper Solomon Star praised him as a "great leader" and one of the "greatest figures" in the country's history.

Andrew Nori's wife, Delmah Nori, founded the Twelve Pillars to Peace and Prosperity Party in 2010. She is also the former president of the Solomon Islands Netball Association.
