= La'aka =

Spirit in Solomon Islands mythology

La'aka is a powerful ancestress and one of the most widely propitiated of spirits among the eastern Kwaio on Malaita, Solomon Islands. She is seen as both a protective figure who exemplifies maternal virtues and the productive powers of women and as a warrior whose deeds rivalled those of the ancient Kwaio strongmen who, as ancestral spirits (adalo), are propitiated and confer power to the living. She is one of the great ancestors of about twelve to twenty generations ago, which do not represent the starting point of the deepest genealogies, but represent those believed to have founded the modern Kwaio way of life.

In 1939 a priest above Uru named Noto'i received messages from La'aka that she had visited America and spoken with the American King, and announced that American warships would come and kill all British colonial officials. On the basis of these pronouncements, many Kwaio built houses to accommodate the American visitors. Messages from La'aka were spoken in tongues, then translated by Noto'i. British officers arrested Noto'i and his followers, and when the Americans did not appear, many believers became disillusioned, though the movement continued underground for several years.

By 1942, the British had in fact scattered in the face of the Japanese invasion, and the Americans came later in the Guadalcanal campaign. Malaita was in general not involved in World War II, but many Kwaio volunteered for the Solomon Island Labour Corps positions assisting the Americans on Guadalcanal or Tulagi. They found Americans generous and suspicious of colonial motives in a way the British had not been, and their experience with the Americans led to the anti-colonial movement Maasina Ruru.
