= 2021 in the Solomon Islands =

- Decades: 2000s; 2010s; 2020s
- See also: Other events of 2021; Timeline of Solomon history

Events in the year 2021 in the Solomon Islands.

== Incumbents ==
- Monarch: Elizabeth II
- Governor-General: David Vunagi
- Prime Minister: Manasseh Sogavare

== Events ==
Ongoing — COVID-19 pandemic in Solomon Islands, 2021 Solomon Islands unrest

== Deaths ==
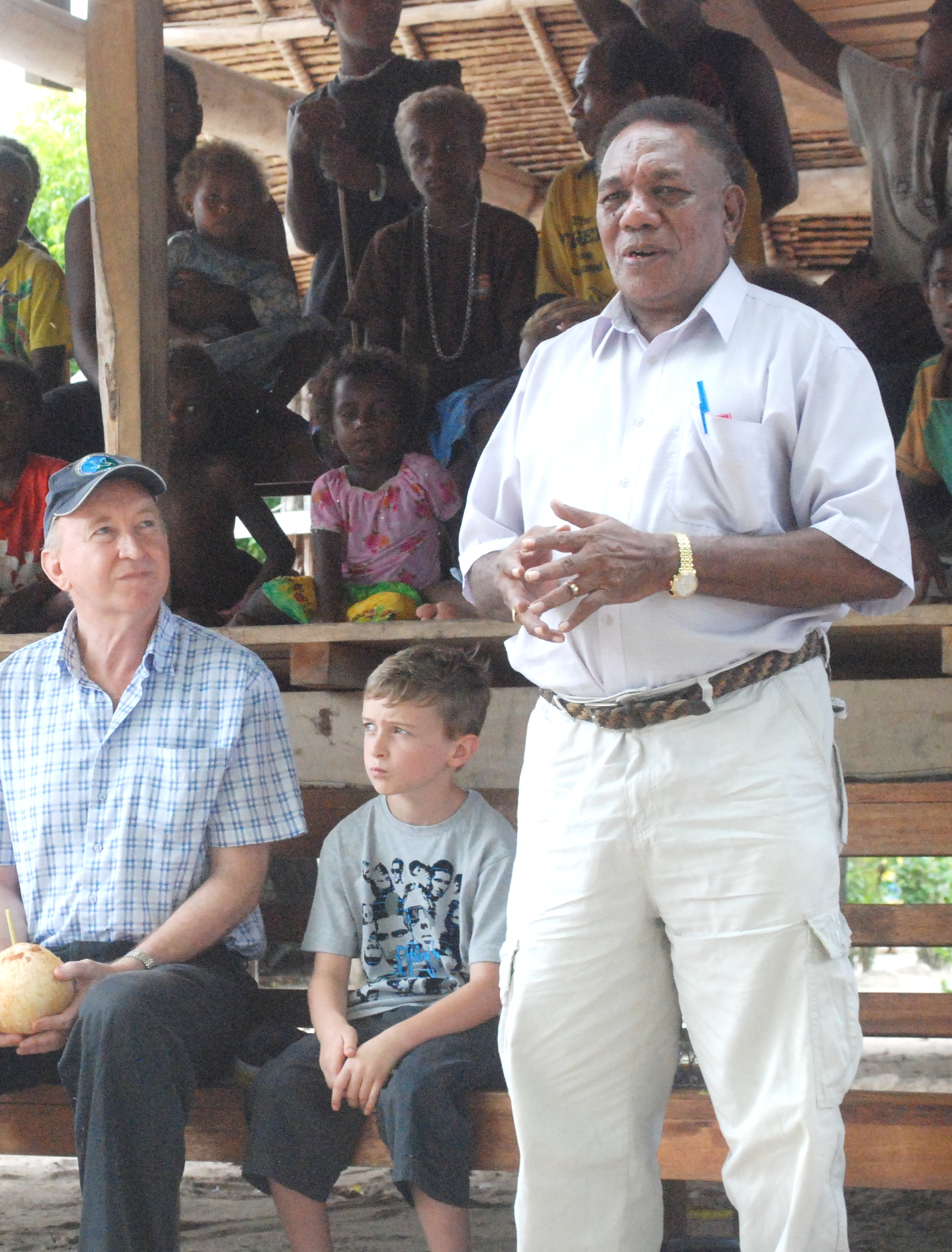
Paul Tovua

- 5 February – Paul Tovua, politician, Speaker of the National Parliament of Solomon Islands (born 1947).
