= Harold Keke =

Solomon Islands warlord (born 1971)

- Keke in 2003
- Born: 1971 (age 54–55)
- Military career
- Allegiance: Guadalcanal Revolutionary Army
- Branch: Militia
- Rank: General

Harold Keke (born 1971) is a former Solomon Islands warlord involved with the Guadalcanal Revolutionary Army (GRA).

He surrendered to an Australian led peacekeeper force in 2003 and sentenced to life imprisonment for murder.

== Biography ==
The grandson of one of the founders of the South Seas Evangelical Church in Australia, Keke was raised a Catholic in the Solomons, but left the faith to become a petty criminal in Papua New Guinea. After a number of years, he returned home, where he took work as a police officer, and embraced evangelical Christianity.

During the 1990s, tensions flared up between indigenous inhabitants of Guadalcanal and immigrants from neighboring Malaita. Following the election of Bartholomew Ulufa'alu, militants, including those led by a newly radicalized Keke, began a campaign of intimidation and violence against Malaitan settlers. This, including Keke's 1998 raid of a police armory, led to the formation of the Malaita Eagle Force (MEF) and all out ethnic warfare in the islands.

Keke views himself as a prophet, leading his people to their "promised land". He also claims that he had political backing for the start of the conflict from then-premier Ezekiel Alebua—who provided money, weapons, and ammunition for the GRA. This claim has been denied by Alebua, who calls Keke "little more than a violent thug".

During the ensuing conflict, the MEF gained the upper hand, deposing the government and gaining control of most police forces; making them a de facto extension of the militias. Many of the militias opposed to the MEF struck a peace deal in late 2000, but Keke refused to sign, moving his soldiers into the jungles of the Weather Coast to avoid capture.

The GRA, under Keke's leadership, has been accused of a variety of crimes, including arson, kidnapping, assassination, and murder. Keke has been personally implicated in more than 50 murders, including that of cabinet minister and priest Augustine Geve, as well as seven missionaries from the Melanesian Brotherhood.

In April 2003, seven Christian brothers—Brother Robin Lindsay and his companions—were martyred on the Weather Coast of Guadalcanal by Keke. Six had gone in search of their Brother Nathaniel, who it turns out had already been tortured and killed. During the tensions Nathaniel had befriended the militant group but Harold Keke accused him of being a government spy and he was beaten to death while singing hymns. They are commemorated by the church on 24 April.

In late 2003, following the arrival of a multi-national intervention force led by Australia, Keke called for a cease-fire, and surrendered to peace-keepers. In 2005, he was convicted of the murder of Geve, and sentenced to life in prison.

== See also ==
- History of Solomon Islands
- Regional Assistance Mission to Solomon Islands
- Politics of Solomon Islands
