= Townsville Peace Agreement =

The Townsville Peace Agreement was signed in Townsville, Australia on 15 October 2000 between the Malaita Eagle Force and the Isatabu Freedom Movement. The Agreement successfully calmed the situation in Honiara and the Islands in general after the coup d'état of June that year.

== See also ==
- Operation RAMSI
