= Augustine Geve =

Solomon Islands politician (died 2002)

The Right Honourable Augustine Geve MP

Minister for Youth, Women and Sports
- In office 7 December 2001 – 20 August 2002
- Prime Minister: Allan Kemakeza

Member of Parliament for South Guadalcanal
- In office 5 December 2001 – 20 August 2002
- Preceded by: Victor Samuel Ngele
- Succeeded by: Victor Totu

Personal details
- Died: 20 August 2002 Weather Coast, Guadalcanal
- Cause of death: Assassination

Augustine Geve (died August 20, 2002) was a Solomon Islands Catholic priest and politician.

== Life ==
He was first elected to Parliament in the December 2001 general election, as MP for South Guadalcanal, at the time of the violent ethnic conflict on Guadalcanal. He was then appointed Minister for Youth, Women and Sports in Prime Minister Allan Kemakeza's Cabinet.

== Death ==
On August 20, 2002, Geve was assassinated by Ronnie Cawa, Francis Lela and warlord Harold Keke "on a remote beach" on Guadalcanal. The three men were convicted for the crime and several other murders in March 2005 by High Court judge (and future Governor General) Frank Kabui, who sentenced them to life in jail. Geve's vacant seat in Parliament was filled in a by-election, and he was succeeded by Victor Totu.
