= 2023 in the Solomon Islands =

- Decades: 2000s; 2010s; 2020s
- See also: Other events of 2023; Timeline of Solomon history

Events in the year 2023 in the Solomon Islands.

== Incumbents ==
- Monarch: Charles III
- Governor-General: David Vunagi
- Prime Minister: Manasseh Sogavare

== Events ==
Ongoing — COVID-19 pandemic in Solomon Islands

- 7 February – Police use tear gas to disperse protesters after the governor of Malaita province, Daniel Suidani, is ousted in a no-confidence vote. Suidani was one of the strongest critics of the government's approach to China.
