= 2014 in the Solomon Islands =

- Decades: 1990s; 2000s; 2010s; 2020s
- See also: Other events of 2014; Timeline of Solomon history

The following lists events that happened during 2014 in the Solomon Islands.

== Incumbents ==
- Monarch: Elizabeth II
- Governor-General: Frank Kabui
- Prime Minister: Gordon Darcy Lilo (until December 9), Manasseh Sogavare (starting December 9)

== Events ==
=== April ===
- April 4 - Heavy rainfall from a tropical low causes flooding at Honiara leading to at least 16 deaths and thousands of people being evacuated.
- A 7.7 magnitude earthquake occurs on April 13 204 miles southeast of Honiara, although no fatalities or property damage was recorded.

=== August ===
- August 13 - The Solomon Islands recognise Kosovo.

=== November ===
- November 19 - Independents win a majority of seats in the National Parliament of the Solomon Islands.
