= Johann Dominikus Schultze =

German doctor and natural scientist

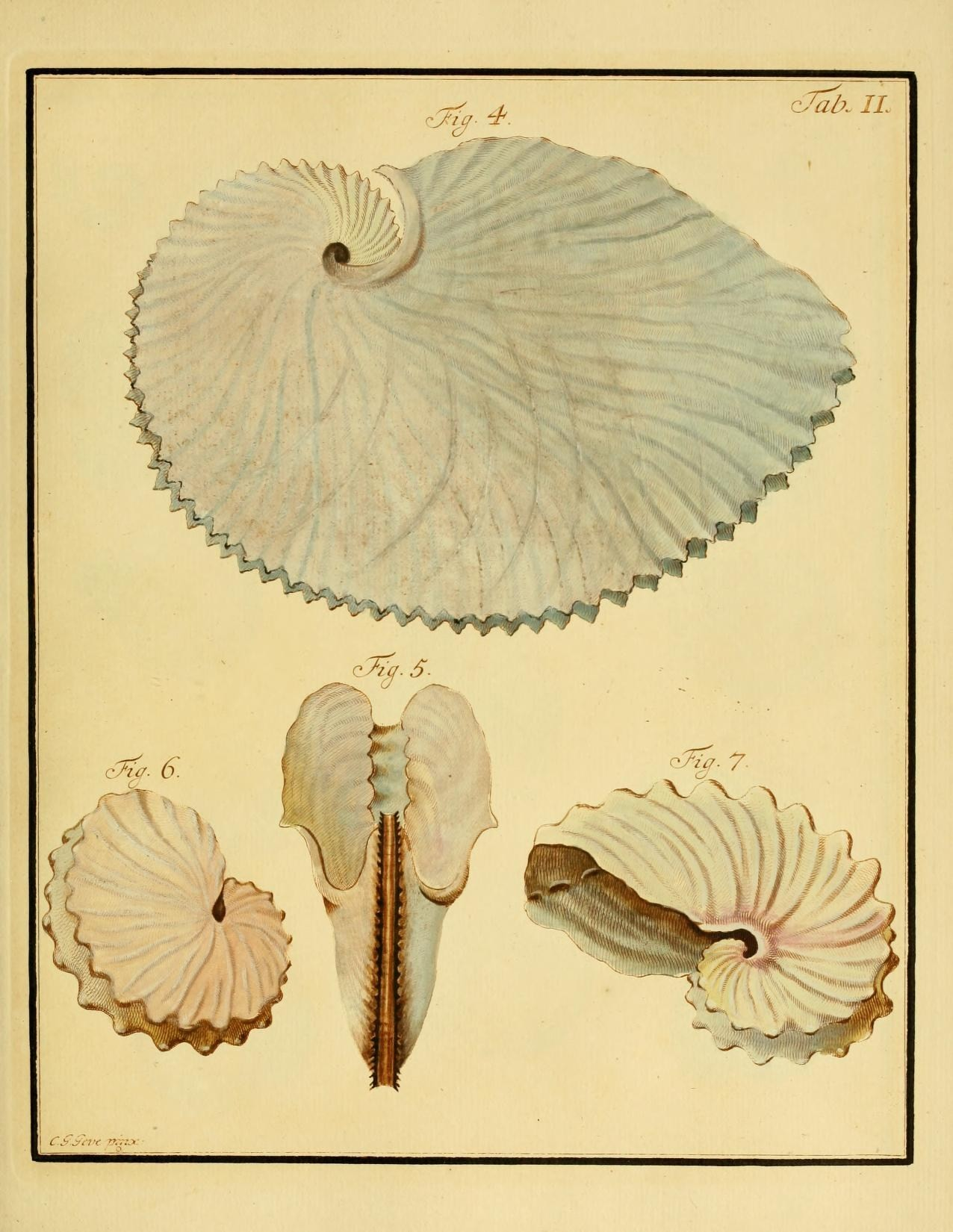

Johann Dominikus Schultze (June 16, 1751 in Gröden - May 22, 1790 in Hamburg) was a medical doctor and natural scientist from the Holy Roman Empire.

== Works ==
- Schulze, I. D. 1775. Beyträge zur Kenntniß seltener Insekten. Erstes Stück. - Der Naturforscher 6: 87–98, Tab. IV [= 4]. Halle.
- Schulze, I. D. 1776. Beyträge zur Kenntniß seltner Insekten. Zweytes Stück. - Der Naturforscher 9: 99–110, Tab. II [= 2]. Halle.
- Schulze, I. D. 1776. Vergleichung der Kupfer eines wenig bekanten Insektenwercs des Wenceslaus Hollar mit dem linnäischen System. - Der Naturforscher 9: 215–224. Halle.
- Geve, N. G. & Schultze, J. D. 1790. Belustigung im Reiche der Natur. Erster Band aus den Papieren des Verstorbenen vollendet durch Johannes Dominicus Schultze. Mit 18 ausgemahlten Kupfertafeln. - pp. I-VI [= 1-6], 1–121, Tab. I-XVIII [= 1-18]. Hamburg. (Herold).

== Education ==
He attended the Johanneum and the Akademisches Gymnasium in Hamburg. Here he heard lectures by the doctor and naturalist Johann Albert Heinrich Reimarus and the doctor and botanist Paul Dietrich Giseke .

== Other ==
The 1776 description of Papilio arnaca by Johann Christian Fabricius was based on an unspecified number of specimens from Suriname, in Schulze's collection. Two other Schulze Lepidoptera were species of "Papilio" for which he selected names which had recently been introduced by Pieter Cramer (claudia and iphigenia) for other species in Uitlandsche Kapellen. Thus Schulze's names were invalid primary homonyms. Schulze said that Fabricius had visited him in Hamburg to see his collection, and would be including the new species in the "mantissa" (or supplement) to his Systema entomologiæ (1775) Fabricius duly did so in the 1777 Genera insectorum and Schulze's new names are often credited to Fabricius in error.
