= 2024 in the Solomon Islands =

- Decades: 2000s; 2010s; 2020s
- See also: Other events of 2024; Timeline of Solomon history

Events in the year 2024 in the Solomon Islands.

== Incumbents ==
- Monarch: Charles III
- Governor-General: David Vunagi (until 7 July), David Tiva Kapu (7 July onwards)
- Prime Minister: Manasseh Sogavare (until 2 May); Jeremiah Manele (2 May onwards)

== Events ==
- 17 April – 2024 Solomon Islands general election: Voters elect a new National Parliament. The ruling OUR Party of Prime Minister Manasseh Sogavare wins a plurality of 15 seats.
- 2 May – Jeremiah Manele is elected Prime Minister of Solomon Islands.
- 20 December – Australia announces an agreement valued at AUD190 million ($118 million) to fund and train the Royal Solomon Islands Police Force until 2028 and establish a police training center in Honiara.

== Holidays ==
- 1 January - New Year's Day
- 29 March - Good Friday
- 30 March - Easter Saturday
- 1 April - Easter Monday
- 14 June - King's Birthday
- 7 July - Independence Day
- 25 December - Christmas Day
- 26 December – National Day of Thanksgiving
