= Thomas Geve =

German-born engineer and Holocaust survivor (1929–2024)

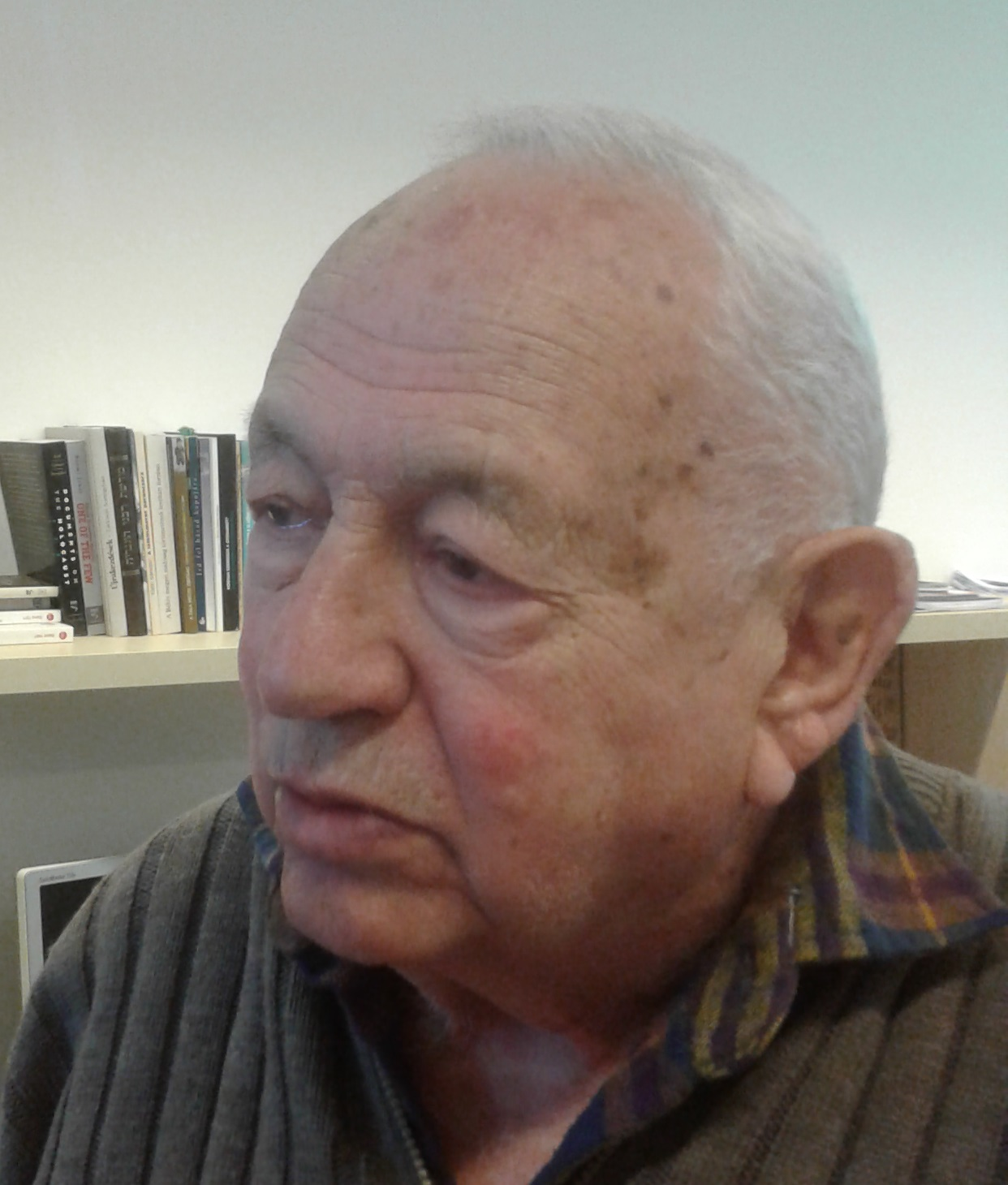

Thomas Geve (Hebrew: תומאס גבה; 27 October 1929 – 27 August 2024) was a German-born engineer, author and Jewish Holocaust survivor.

== Biography ==
Born in Stettin on 27 October 1929, he lived as child in Beuthen, before moving to Berlin with his mother in 1939. During the war years, he worked for some months as a gravedigger at the Weißensee Cemetery. He was deported to Auschwitz in June 1943 with his mother, who perished in the camp. He stayed in Auschwitz until its evacuation in January 1945, after which he still survived the death march from Auschwitz to Loslau, then loaded onto freight trains and transported to Gross-Rosen concentration camp and Buchenwald concentration camp before the latter was self-liberated by the inmates in April 1945. Upon liberation he was too weak to leave the camp and proceeded to record camp life in 79 different drawings. After the war, he went to a camp in Switzerland for orphaned shoah survivors, and when his father was located, he was reunited with him in England. In 1950 he emigrated to Israel and settled in Haifa and moved later to live several years with his partner Shoshanna Lehrer in the retirement home Beth Juliana in Herzliya.

His experiences are retold in two books and two documentary films. The first book, Youth in Chains, recounting his wartime years, was subsequently republished and translated into six other languages. His second book, recounting his experiences after the war, was published in German. In addition, his drawings have also been published separately and made into a French-language documentary. Until his death, he lectured about the Shoah at schools in Germany and other countries.

Geve (real name is Stefan Cohn) died in the retirement home Beth Juliana in Herzliya in Israel on 27 August 2024, at the age of 94.

== Bibliography ==
- Geve, Thomas (1958), Youth in Chains, Jerusalem: Rubin Mass, 220 pp. later republished as Geve, Thomas (1987), Guns & Barbed Wire: A Child Survives the Holocaust, Chicago: Academy Chicago Publishers, 220 pp.
- Geve, Thomas (1997), Es gibt hier keine Kinder - There are no children here; Zeichnungen eines kindliches Historikers - Drawings of a Child Historian (German - English - Hebrew), Göttingen: Wallstein Verlag, 151 pp.
- Geve, Thomas (2000), Aufbrüche. Weiterleben nach Auschwitz, Südverlag, 193 pp.
- Geve, Thomas (2021), The Boy Who Drew Auschwitz: A Powerful True Story of Hope and Survival, London: HarperCollins, ISBN 9780008406387, 304 pp.

== Documentary film ==
- W Rosing, "Thomas Geve - Nichts als das Leben", 1997, 36 min.
- ECPAD, "Il n'y a pas d'enfants ici : Dessins d'un enfant survivant des camps de concentration", 2009, 75 min.
