= Patrick Vahoe =

Solomon Islands politician (born 1970)

Patrick Vahoe (born March 11, 1970) is a Solomon Islands politician. He is a member of the National Parliament of the Solomon Islands, and was elected to the Parliament representing the Malaita Outer Islands Constituency on April 5, 2006.
