= Isatabu Freedom Movement =

Militant organisation from Solomon Islands

The Isatabu Freedom Movement (IFM) was a nationalist militant organisation of the island of Guadalcanal in Solomon Islands.

The movement also included other factions such as the Guadalcanal Revolutionary Army and the Guadalcanal Liberation Front which was led by warlord Harold Keke. It was engaged in fighting against the Solomon Island Government and the Guadalcanal Provincial Government as well as with another militant organisation, Malaita Eagle Force. In response to the fighting, the government enacted the Regional Assistance Mission to Solomon Islands.

The group is said to be influenced by the Moro Movement of the 1930s, with its return to the name of Isatabu from the colonial Guadalcanal, and demands the establishment of a federal government system.

Most militants, with the notable exception of Keke and the GLF, put down arms after leaders signed the Townsville Peace Agreement.

== Quote ==
Dear Mr Government

When I give food to the poor, they call me a saint. [But] when I ask why the poor have no food, they call me a communist, (Anon)

The above saying epitomises what is happening to us.
Look, Mr. Government, when we give our land for your benefit and that of the nation-state,
You call us generous.
When we ask why we have not benefited, you ignored us.
When we start shouting, wanting to be heard, you call us troublemakers.
When we take up arms to ask what rightfully belongs to us, you call us militants.
When we became angry because you trampled on us, you call us hot-headed youth.
Those are the names you use to justify your disregard for/of us.
Soon, you may call us guerrillas or terrorists.
That, however, will not get rid of us.

(Isatabu Tavuli: The Isatabu Freedom Movement newsletter, 24 February 2000, volume 1 number 3: 3).
