= 2025 in the Solomon Islands =

- Decades: 2000s; 2010s; 2020s
- See also: Other events of 2025; Timeline of Solomon history

Events in the year 2025 in the Solomon Islands.

== Incumbents ==
- Monarch: Charles III
- Governor-General: David Tiva Kapu
- Prime Minister: Jeremiah Manele

== Events ==
=== February ===
- 8 February – The 2025 Miss Pacific Islands pageant is held in Honiara.
- 27 February – Australia launches a driver training program in the Solomon Islands

=== March ===
- 31 March – Senior Sergeant Raymond Togapada becomes the 1st person from the Royal Solomon Islands Police Force to graduate from the Federal Bureau of Investigation Academy.

=== April ===
- 4 April – The Solomon Islands and San Marino formalize diplomatic relations.
- 9 April –
  - The Saudi Fund for Development signs a development cooperation agreement with the Solomon Islands.
  - The Central Bank of Solomon Islands grants IumiCash with a Money Transfer Service (MTS) license.

=== August ===
- 6 August – The Solomon Islands blocks the United States, China, Taiwan, and 18 donor countries from attending the Pacific Islands Forum Leaders Meeting, citing an incomplete review of relationships with Pacific nations and following pressure from Beijing.

=== September ===
- 12 September – 2025 Pacific Islands Forum Leaders Meeting in Honiara.

== Holidays ==
- 1 January – New Year's Day
- 18 April – Good Friday
- 19 April – Easter Saturday
- 21 April – Easter Monday
- 7 July – Independence Day
- 25 December – Christmas Day
- 26 December – National Day of Thanksgiving

== Deaths ==
- 7 March – Sir David Vunagi, 74, governor-general (2019–2024) and archbishop and primate of Melanesia (2009–2017).
- 10 March – Sir Francis Billy Hilly, 76, prime minister (1993–1994).
- 4 August – Snyder Rini, 77, prime minister (2006).
- 21 October – Daniel Suidani, 55, premier of Malaita Province (2019–2023).
