= Nicolaus Georg Geve =

Danish painter and illustrator

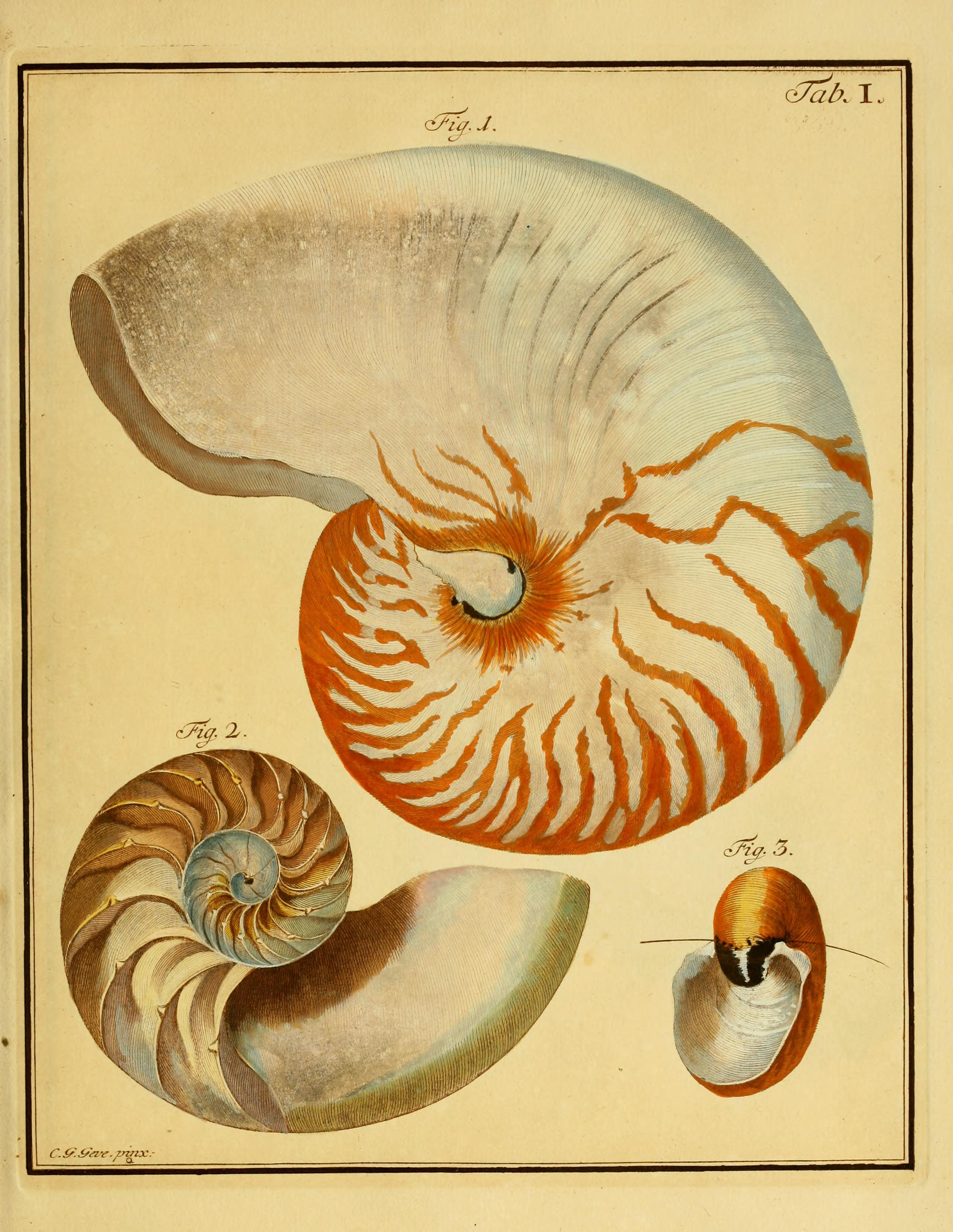
Reiche der Natur Plate

Nicolaus Georg Geve, also Claus Georg Geve (1712 - 21 June 1789 in Schleswig) was a Danish painter and illustrator. It is thought that Geve was born in either Schleswig or Hesse.

== Life ==
Geve was a student of the royal Danish court painter Johann Salomon Wahl in Copenhagen. Later he made numerous trips through Germany, France and Italy to earn a living in cities and on country estates as a portrait painter. In the 1740s he worked in Lübeck, Schwerin and Hamburg. In 1756 he applied to paint the audience room in the Lübeck town hall but this commission went to Stefano Torelli.

In 1755 he began publishing the Monatliche Belustigungen im Reiche der Natur (Monthly amusements in the realm of nature) in Hamburg. On 33 plates, it shows a total of 463 shells in detailed watercolour on copperplate engravings. The work was first completely published in 1790 from his estate by the Hamburg doctor and natural scientist Johann Dominikus Schultze. From 1765/66 he stayed in Schleswig and finally settled there in 1770. Here he worked for the governor Karl von Hessen-Kassel and as a drawing teacher at the Schleswig cathedral school. Several of his portraits have survived through engravings by Martin Bernigeroth and Christian Fritzsch.

In 1759 he married Catharina Dorothea Zöllner, a daughter of the decorative painter Johann Martin Zöllner in Copenhagen, who had been a chambermaid of Louise of Denmark until the Princess died in 1756. The couple died without descendants. Hence Geve's significant collection of old paintings, drawings and engravings came up for auction as in individual pieces.

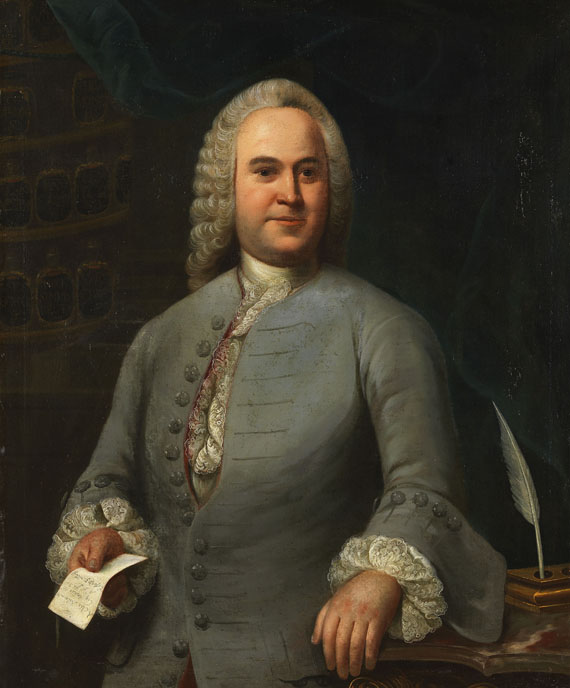
Portrait of an apothecary 1751

== Portraits ==
Portrait of the pastor Erdmann Neumeister, Hamburg, main church Sankt Jacobi in Hamburg.

Portrait of the pastor Heinrich Scharbau (1759) St. Aegidien in Lübeck. Half-length portrait of Johann Gottlob Carpzov (1747), Lübeck, formerly above the entrance to the Carpzov grave chapel in the castle church, today St. Anne's Museum (engraved in 1747 by Johann Martin Bernigeroth).

Full-length portrait of Johann Gottlob Carpzov (1756), Lübeck, St. Marien, destroyed in the air raid on Lübeck in 1942 survived in partial copy from 1760 by an unknown painter, on permanent loan from the St. Annen Museum to the Stadtbibliothek (Lübeck). de

Portrait of the Duke Karl Leopold of Mecklenburg-Schwerin (?) (1747), State Museum Schwerin.

Full figure portrait of Pastor Peter Cramer (1777), Schleswig Cathedral.

== Natural history works ==
- Nicolaus Georg Gevens Belustigung im Reiche der Natur. Erster Band aus den Papieren des Verstorbenen vollendet durch Johannes Dominicus Schultze mit 18 Kupfertafeln, Gebrüder Herold 1790, in German and French(Nicolaus Georg Geve is available for free viewing and download at the Internet Archive oder biodiversitylibrary.org).
- Nicolaus Georg Gevens Conchylien-Cabinet … systematisch nach der 13ten Gmelinschen Ausgabe des Linnéischen Systems. Herold und Wahlstab, Lüneburg 1830 (Nicolaus Georg Geve is available for free viewing and download at the Internet Archive)

== Impact ==
Nissen comments on Conchylien-Cabinet for which Geve supplied 33 plates in copper engraving with 434 figures "the extremely careful painting in water colors was much praised and remained exemplary for a long time."
