= Solomon Islands Labour Corps =

The Solomon Islands Labour Corps (SILC) was a World War II organization of about 3,200 native Solomon Islanders who served in the allied war effort. The corps were stationed at all military establishments, especially the large bases at Guadalcanal, the Russell Islands, and Tulagi. It was established in 1942 and functioned until 1946. Others worked in the British Solomon Islands Protectorate Defence Force.

Officially, members of the corps received one pound per month in wages, although in practice they earned more from generous Americans for souvenirs or personal services. Political ideas from Americans about self-determination and class consciousness spread, and it was former members of the SILC who began the anti-colonial Maasina Ruru movement after the war.

The meshing of different language groups in the corps and their contact with Americans had significant impact on Pijin, the Solomon Islands pidgin.
