= Maasina Rule =

Independence movement in the British Solomon Islands

Maasina Rule or Maasina Ruru was an emancipation movement for self-government and self-determination in the British Solomon Islands during and after World War II, 1945–1950, credited with creating the movement towards independence for the Solomon Islands. The name is from the ꞋAreꞌare language meaning the Rule of "relationship of siblings together" and is often corrupted to "Marching Rule", "Marxist Rule", or "Rule of Brotherhood".

== Foundation and influences ==
The movement was created after Nori, Aliki Nono'oohimae, Jonathan Fiifii'i, and a host of others from Malaita who worked together in the Solomon Islands Labour Corps during World War II. One of the influences is said to have been the African-American soldiers whose humane treatment of the fellow workers was markedly different from the plantation owners. They spread a message of independence amongst the Malaitan soldiers who began a campaign of non-compliance and civil disobedience.

They were also influenced by other revolutionary or anti-government movements, progressive missionaries such as Rev. Richard Fallowes and apocalyptic movements such as that of the priest Noto'i. During 1939 in Uogwari and Atobala he had been a prophet of the ancestor La'aka and channelled that Tulagi would be destroyed and the government would be thrown into the sea. His followers were arrested by the government but in 1946, the capital moved from Tulagi to Honiara. Noto'i joined the Maasina Rule movement as did people from all over the islands.

== Operation DeLouse and Operation Jericho ==
In 1947, the British government launched Operation De-Louse to arrest the leaders of the movement. The nine main chiefs or Alaha were also arrested and charged under the Sedition Act for organising secret meetings. This despite the fact that Maasina Rule meetings were mass meetings of thousands of people at a time. They were mostly sentenced, including Fifi'i, Nonoohimae and Aliki, to six and a half years hard labour.

While the leaders were in jail the campaign of civil disobedience continued with villages refusing to pay taxes en masse. While many villages were also barricaded against the British, the government launched Operation Jericho. Two thousand arrests were made in Malaita alone, and yet the resistance continued.

In 1951 the British government held meetings with the imprisoned leadership and brokered a deal for self-government in the form of the Malaitan Congress. The prisoners were released and demands were met towards the end of 1951.

== See also ==
- Moro Movement
