= Regional Assistance Mission to Solomon Islands =

Response to request for help from Solomon Islands

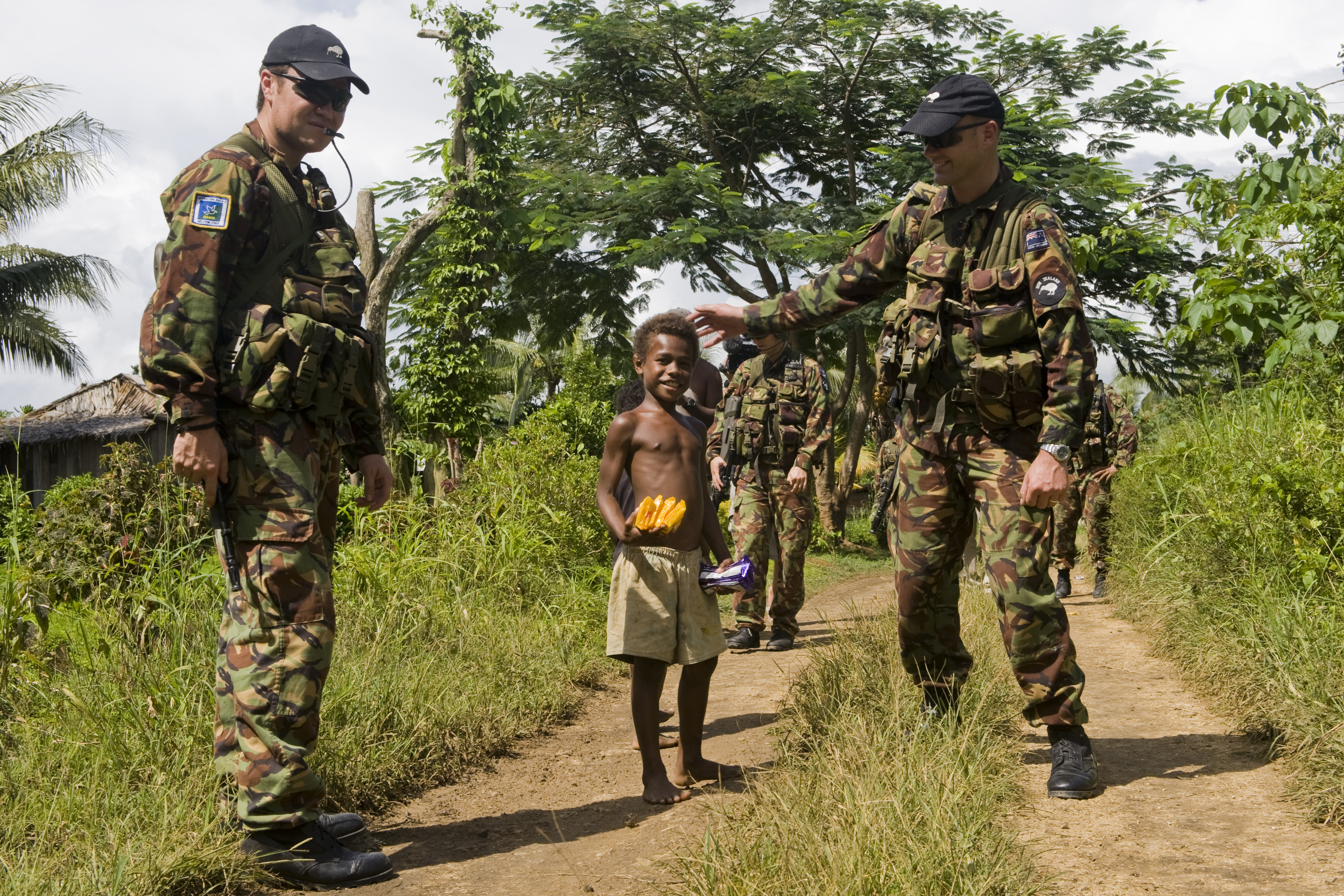
- New Zealand soldiers patrolling in 2009.
Date	24 July 2003 – 30 June 2017 (13 years, 11 months and 6 days)
Location	Solomon Islands
Result	Stabilisation of Solomon Islands

Belligerents
Solomon Islands: Royal Solomon Islands Police Force; Participating Police Force: Australia; Fiji; New Zealand; Palau; Papua New Guinea; Marshall Islands; Federated States of Micronesia; Tonga; Samoa; Vanuatu; Nauru; Kiribati; Tuvalu	Nationalist Militias: Isatabu Freedom Movement; Malaita Eagle Force; Other unorganised militias

Commanders and leaders
Allan Kemakeza; Snyder Rini; Manasseh Sogavare; Derek Sikua; Danny Philip; Gordon Darcy Lilo; Nick Warner; Peter Noble Sekove Naqiolevu	Jimmy Lusibaea Harold Keke

Strength
Solomon Islands: ~1,150 police Australia: 7,200 soldiers 1,700 police New Zealand: 160 soldiers 70 police	Unknown

Casualties and losses
- ~200 killed, thousands displaced

The Regional Assistance Mission to Solomon Islands (RAMSI), also known as Operation Helpem Fren, Operation Anode and Operation Rata (by New Zealand), began in 2003 in response to a request for international aid by the governor-general of Solomon Islands. Helpem Fren means "help a friend" in Solomon Islands Pidgin. The mission officially ended on 30 June 2017.

== Causes for unrest ==
Deep-seated problems of land alienation dating from colonialism, unresolved after independence, led to a number of compensation claims on land use; and ethnic violence between 1998 and 2003.

"The Honiara Peace Accord that was signed by the warring parties (Guadalcanal and Malaita), the government and the Commonwealth Special Envoy (Major General Sitiveni Rabuka) recognised several root causes of the conflict:

- Land demands – Guadalcanal leaders wanted all alienated land titles, which had been leased to government and to individual developers, to be returned to landowners (including any other land acquired illegally).
- Political demands – Guadalcanal wanted the establishment of a state government in order to have control over: the sale or use of local land; the distribution of wealth derived from local natural resources; and the migration of people in and out of the province.
- Compensation demands – Guadalcanal wanted payment for the lives of its indigenous people, who have been brutally murdered for their lands or for other reasons."

The warring parties mentioned were mainly the Solomon Islands Government, the Isatabu Freedom Movement and the Malaita Eagle Force led by, among others, Jimmy Rasta and Harold Keke.

== International response ==
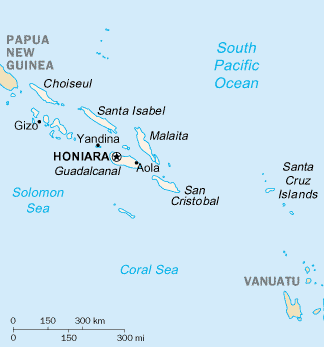
Map of Solomon Islands

A sizeable international security contingent of 2,200 police and troops, led by Australia (under the Australian Federal Police and Australian Defence Force name "Operation Anode") and New Zealand, and with representatives from about six other Pacific nations began arriving on 24 July 2003.

Nick Warner assumed the role of Special Coordinator as leader of RAMSI, working with the Solomon Islands Government and assisted by a New Zealand Deputy Special Coordinator, Peter Noble, and Fijian Assistant Special Coordinator, Sekove Naqiolevu. Major contributing nations to RAMSI include Australia (which directed the operation), Fiji, New Zealand, Papua New Guinea, and Tonga. Pacific countries contribute to RAMSI including Cook Islands, Federated States of Micronesia, Fiji, Kiribati, Marshall Islands, Nauru, Niue, Palau, Papua New Guinea, Samoa, Tonga, Tuvalu and Vanuatu. Personnel from the Pacific countries are predominantly police officers served as part of RAMSI's Participating Police Force (PPF).

Initially, the commander of "Combined Task Force 635" (CTF 635) – the military element of the Mission – was Lieutenant Colonel John Frewen, commanding officer of the 2nd Battalion, Royal Australian Regiment (2 RAR), and the deputy commander Major Vern Bennett, New Zealand Army, from Linton. The Land Component included HQ 2 RAR from Townsville, 200 Australian infantry from 2 RAR, a Fijian rifle company, probably from 3 Fiji Infantry Regiment, Queen Elizabeth Bks, Suva, and a Pacific Islands Company, under an Australian Company commander, with Tongan, PNG, and Australian rifle platoons. Supporting elements included eight Iroquois Helicopters, four each from 3 SQN, Royal New Zealand Air Force and 171 Operational Support Squadron, Australian Army, a PNG engineer troop, New Zealand engineer and medical elements, an Australian Combat Service Support Team, with some personnel from Army level troops from Sydney plus logistics personnel from New Zealand, and four Australian Project Nervana Unmanned Aerial Vehicles for surveillance.

In 2004, James Batley took over as Special Coordinator, followed by Tim George in late 2006. In 2005 New Zealander Paul Ash became Deputy Special Coordinator, followed by Dr Jonathan Austin in 2007. Mataiasi Lomaloma succeeded Naqiolevu as Assistant Special Coordinator in late 2005. Military personnel provide security, material and logistical assistance to police forces assisting the Solomon Islands Government in the restoration of law and order. From November 2003, the military component was reduced, as stability gradually returned to the country, and a sizeable civilian contingent, composed of economists, development assistance specialists and budget advisors commenced the reconstruction of the government, economy and finances of Solomon Islands. The civilian contingent is now made up of around 130 personnel from many pacific countries, the most sizeable being Australia and New Zealand. Early successes included the stabilisation of government finances and normalisation of debt, as well as a number of economic reforms. Civilians in RAMSI are now focussing on capacity building of Solomon Islanders to take over the roles. Difficulties include the lack of available skilled Solomon Islanders.

Former Solomon Islands Prime Minister Manasseh Sogavare was outspoken in his criticism of RAMSI, which he accused of being dominated by Australia and of undermining the Solomons' sovereignty. By contrast, his successor Prime Minister Derek Sikua has stated he supports RAMSI, and has criticised his predecessor, saying in January 2008: "I think for some time in the last 18 months, the Solomon Islands government was preoccupied with finding fault in RAMSI." Sikua has stated:

"[We will] provide leadership that will work closely with RAMSI to achieve clearly stated and agreed objectives for the long-term benefit of Solomon Islands. [...] RAMSI is here on our invitation. [...] [The mission] is important to Solomon Islands as it provides security, development of our police service, and the strengthening of the capacity of government institutions."

Sikua has also asked RAMSI to assist the Solomons' rural areas "in the health sector and in the education sector as well as in infrastructure and other sectors to do with income generation and economic activities".

A documentary film about the tension times and the RAMSI intervention was filmed in 2013, directed by Michael Bainbridge and Mark Power.

== Australian deaths ==
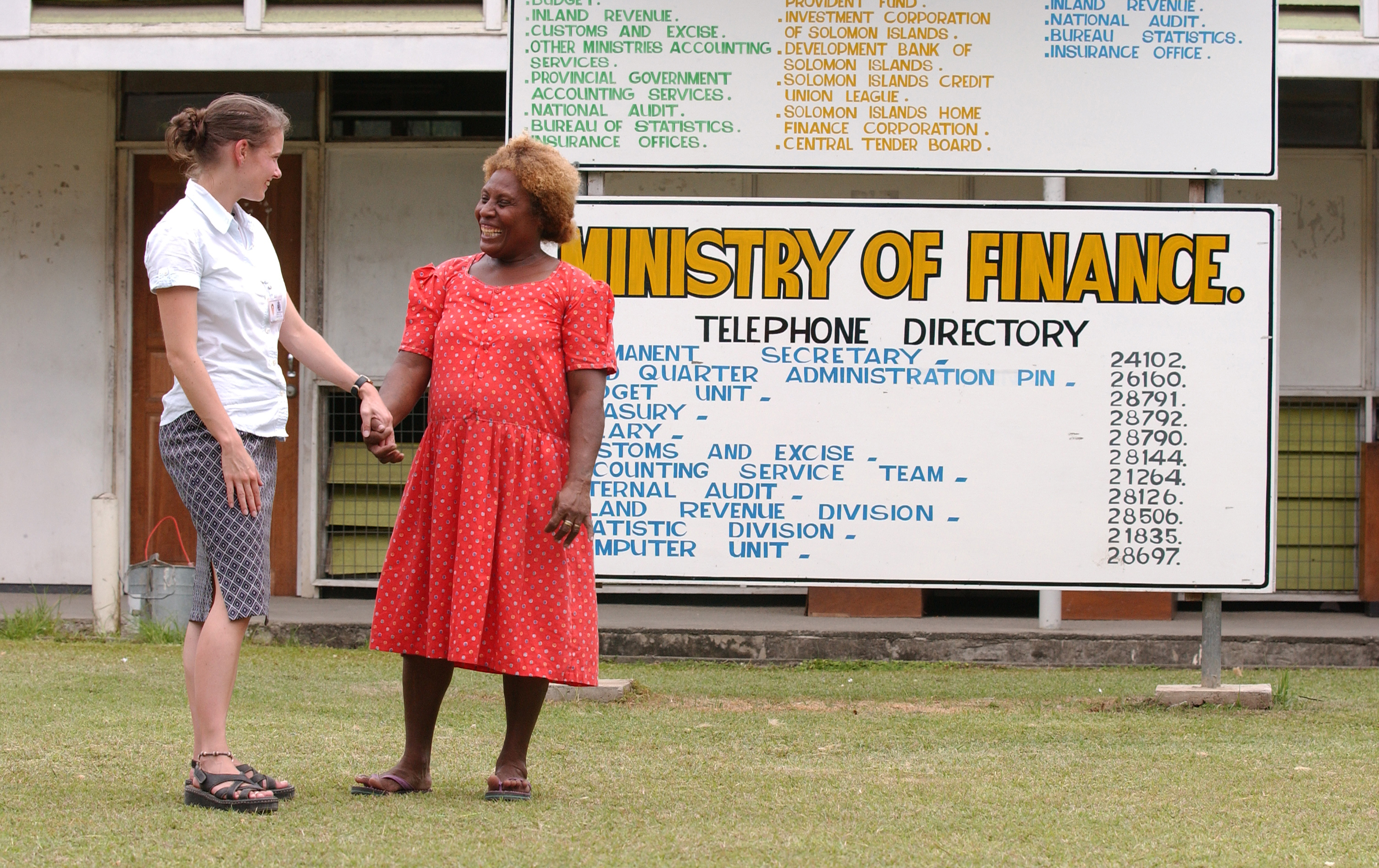
RAMSI adviser Sally Taylor with Ruth Gilbert from the Solomon Islands Ministry of Finance.

In the early hours of 22 December 2004, Australian Protective Service Officer Adam Dunning was ambushed and killed while on a routine vehicle patrol with another officer in Honiara. Within 24 hours, a Ready Combat Team from the 1st Battalion, Royal Australian Regiment was flown into Solomon Islands.

In early January 2005, a joint operation between the Royal Solomon Islands Police (RSIP) and Participating Police Force (PPF) resulted in the arrest of James Tatau. Tatau was charged with Dunning's murder, the attempted murder of his colleague, and an earlier shooting incident on a Participating Police Force (PPF) vehicle, in which a bullet narrowly missed two PPF officers. After the arrest, the military presence within RAMSI was again reduced. By 2005, the five troop-contributing nations (Australia, New Zealand, Papua New Guinea, Fiji and Tonga) together provided approximately 40 personnel to support the PPF.

Solomon Islanders James Tatau and John Hen Ome were acquitted after standing trial for the killing of Adam Dunning in May 2007.

An Australian soldier, Private Jamie Clark, died in 2005 after falling down a sinkhole while serving as a peacekeeper in Solomon Islands.

== Riots following 2006 general election ==
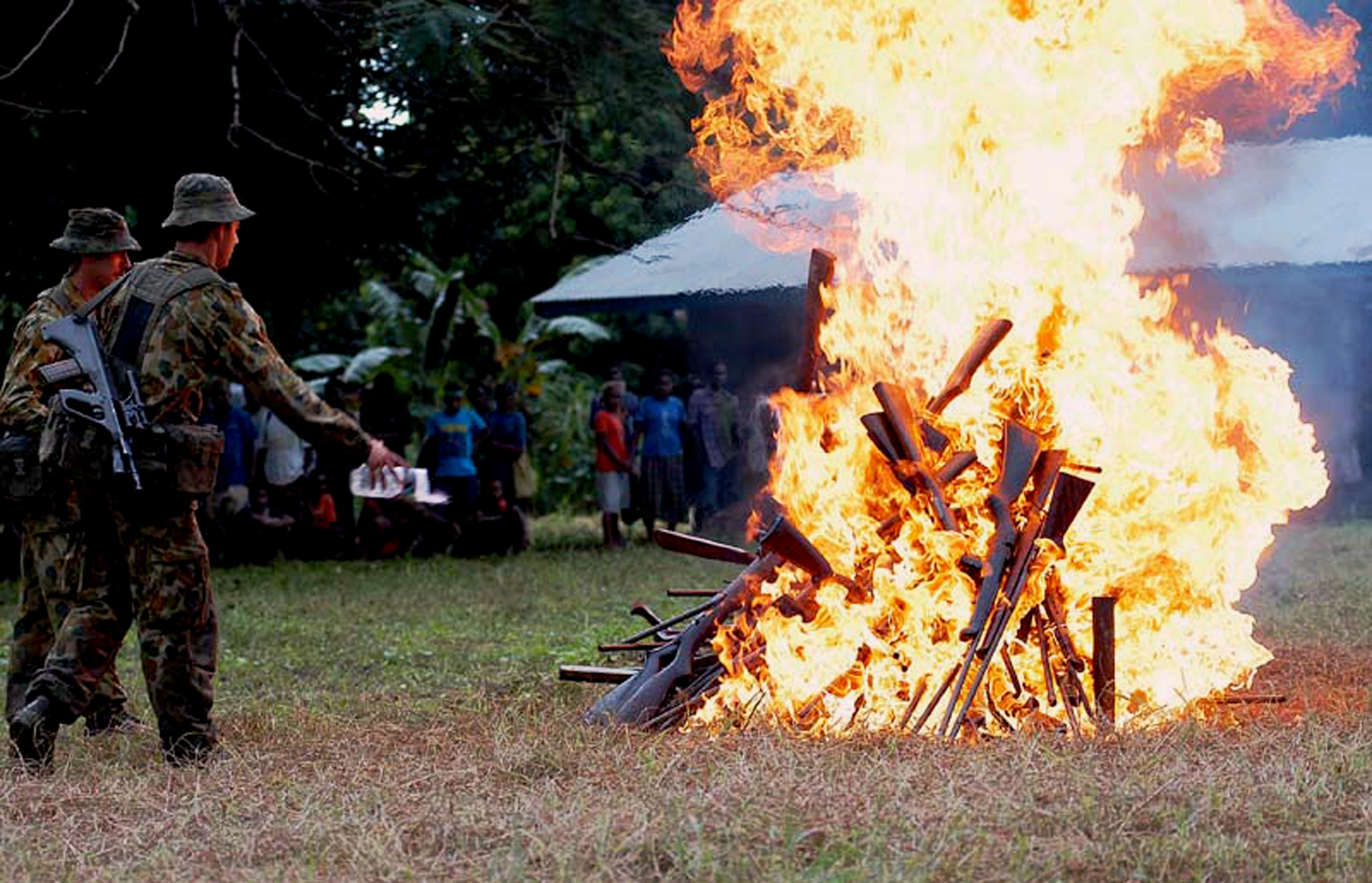
Australian soldiers assigned to RAMSI burning guns in October 2003

On 18 April 2006 Snyder Rini was elected Prime Minister of Solomon Islands in a general election. This sparked rioting in Honiara amidst allegations that the election was fixed with the aid of money from Chinese businessmen. Parts of Honiara were razed and looted, with Chinese-owned property particularly targeted. With up to 90% of their shops burnt down in Chinatown, most Chinese have evacuated the country in fear of their personal safety. Snyder Rini resigned on the floor of Parliament on 26 April after just eight days as Prime Minister and as MPs were due to vote on a motion of no confidence against him.

In response, from 20 April 2006, RAMSI forces were rapidly bolstered by a further 220 Australian troops. New Zealand sent a further rifle company and 30 police to increase its RAMSI contribution to around 160 troops and 67 police.

The PPF comprised police officers from 15 Pacific nations: Australia, New Zealand, Papua New Guinea, Fiji, Republic of Marshall Islands, Palau, Federated States of Micronesia, Niue, Tonga, Samoa, Cook Islands, Vanuatu, Nauru, Kiribati and Tuvalu.

== 2013 military withdrawal ==
On 1 July 2013, Australia, New Zealand, Tonga and Papua New Guinean forces began a "phased redeployment" from Solomon Islands after it was assessed that the security situation in the country had stabilised. The last Australian troops returned to Australia on 1 August 2013. All Australian personnel and equipment were scheduled to be withdrawn by September 2013. After arriving on 24 July 2003, a total of 7,270 Australian personnel deployed during that country's support to RAMSI. Of these, 2,122 were Reserve personnel.

== Cost ==
In the year of 2011–12, $43.5 million was spent on the Australian contribution to the RAMSI. In 2014 Jenny Hayward-Jones at the Lowy Institute estimated that Australian government spending on RAMSI as $2.6 billion in real terms to that date.

== See also ==
- People's Power Action Party
- 2021 Solomon Islands unrest
