= Ministry of Education and Human Resources Development =

The Ministry of Education and Human Resources Development (MEHRD) is the education ministry of the Oceanian country of the Solomon Islands, headquartered in Honiara.
