= Moro Movement =

Organisation in the Solomon Islands

The aim of the Moro Movement of Isatabu, in Solomon Islands, has been described as "Sai lima horohoro tuali" – "Putting lands together in living as before". A movement for social economic and political improvement using co-operatives economic enterprises in combination with a regard for custom and tradition to synthesise a new social order.

As the Marau-Hauba Council on Guadalcanal, became destabilised in 1956, while a 'back to custom' movement was gaining strength, centred in the south east coastal areas and on the villages in the Suta area – on the northern side of the interior mountains. At Makaruka and Veuru Moli, Pelise Moro started to mobilise people around stories of original creation and a return to the use of name Isatabu instead of Guadalcanal. However, as the movement rose, the Marau-Hauba council was replaced by the Guadalcanal Council.

== Pelise Moro ==
Was born in Makaruka village, Isatabu (Guadalcanal), but much of his childhood was spent in his mothers village in Suhu, east of Makaruka. According to Dominic Alebua, Moro's ancestors come from Nabua village, in the inland Areata area, in Talise. He is the descendant of a woman taken to Makaruka as a Checka (slave). After his mothers brother died, Moro inherited their land. Moros father Tavoruka was a 'Bigman' in Makaruka who held hereditary ritual powers to calm seas, make torrential rain abate and promote the fertility of the yams and taro. Moro learned these skills and inherited them when his father died in 1961. He was baptised a Roman Catholic by Fr. Jean Boudard but did not attend missionary school and is illiterate. In 1962 he married a girl from an inland village. They had 2 children – a son and a daughter.

== Vision and power ==
In 1956 Moro and some men from Komuvaolu, Makaraku, Bokasughu and Nagho went to Korasaghulu reef to stop men from Wanderer bay and the Weather Coast from fishing for trochus shells, as the Moli peoples had claimed ownership of this reef. Upon his return Moro became very ill while at Lauvi Point, where he fell while chasing the Chacha (The Eagle). Moro fell into a deep coma and was even presumed dead. However he recovered consciousness after a few days although he did not fully recover for many months. Moro has also said that during this time he was somewhat mentally ill. After he had recovered, however, Moro had acquired the ability to know who had stolen anything, who performed sorcery, and who was guilty of possessing 'Vele' or 'Piro'. It was at this time also that he began to recount the story of the origin of Guadalcanal. Moro has said that during his illness he had a visit:

“I saw a bird but it was a man. At first it was a bird, it came out of some swirling dust like that behind a truck on the roads of Honiara. The bird changed into a man who spoke and instructed. You must do the things I tell you. Everything in this land and sea belongs to you. You must ignore all those who scoff or tell you not to do it. The things you should start is an association (Kampani, pidgin English for company) to make money All the things that are yours should be used, [n]ot allowed to stand unused or to be exploited by others. Your people own it and control it.”

After his recovery, Moro began telling of his vision and large numbers came to hear it. The stories and visions were written down by members of the movement. David Valusa is one of the main recorders and translators of the movement. He recorded Moro's stories and they are kept at Makaruka, at the headquarters of the Moro Custom Company.

The most important document is the creation story of Guadalcanal, "The story of what our ancestor in the beginning of the island Isatabu." About how Ironggali created the island of Isatabu (Guadalcanal). Ironggali is a spirit or god which lives in the air. When it came to the water it was called Isobotua – i.e. 'sitting on water' or 'floating leg'. Isobotua created the island and the life upon it: first 2 dos Laula (m) and Lauili (f) and then 2 humans: Kaputua and his sister Lavegauna. This text goes on to give the establishment of the four main descent groups or tribes of Qaravu, Manukiki, Koinahao and Lasi.

Another document is the “Custom Company Makaruka and History of the Island Isatabu and its Paramount Chiefs.” This document claims Moro as the paramount Chief in the line of Tuimauri, giving him absolute right to the land of Guadalcanal (Isatabu) as granted by the creator and original ancestral chief Ironggali. The importance of economic transactions and boundaries (district borders) are given value and the document repudiates waste and the concept of Public Land. This was against the Protectorate Government which declared land not occupied by the people as waste and public land.

== Areas ==
Moro as paramount chief had responsibility over the District Chiefs. In 1965, Davnport records 8 districts and their councils: Veuru Moli, Babuli of Makaruka, Longgu district, Ngelea of Purepure and Okimo of Uma, Talise districts, Manu of Ngalitahaverona, Koleuladistrict, Revele and Seve of Valechomara, Suta district, Sakelua and Rupo and Lau district, Manevacha of Vironggono. These districts were the ground support and area of the Moro movement.

Organisation

Since some of the prominent leaders of the Moro Movement were also leaders in Maasina Ruru and there are organisational similarities. Joseph Qoraiga and Ludovic Lui of Nagho who had ‘duties’ in Maasina Ruru, later became ‘village leaders’ (Taovia ni Vera) in MM. In the village areas there are men designated as ‘duties’. They act as messengers, collectors and general aids and contacts to Moro. They are sometimes referred to as a Passion (a pidgin word meaning way of doing things) apart from their jobs as duties they are also responsible for ensuring the village rules and norms are adhered to. A Passion has under him a contingent of ladies called ‘Daki Nonoro’ whose work is to look after visitors.

Another similarity between the 2 movements is the organisation of followers or members into large communal villages. Before this people lived in small villages comprising family members and close relatives. In these villages there is a Luma – a guest house to accommodate visitors. There is also a Tabu House set aside for meetings and ceremonies such as healing rituals. The biggest tabu House is the Custom House at Makaruka which is the HQ of the movement. This house stored valuables such as shell money baskets, traditional artefacts and other objects of significance in the history of Isatabu.

== The Collection and the census ==
Sums of money were collected from followers at the orders of Moro, through the ‘census’. One shilling was called for to aid the cause. In addition to the census contribution, a ‘collection’ was also instituted. This is one pound from each adult male and 10 shillings from each adult female. Another contribution was in shell currency which is kept at the House of Antiquities at Makaruka.

The movement's financial worth in 1990 was estimated at between 20 and 30 thousand SI dollars, including the value of the shell money. There has never been any attempt to use of bank this money though. It is owned by Moro who does not use it either. Alluvial gold is also given free by followers to Moro.

With some of the money collected, some relatively large scale commercial endeavours were begun, including stores at Makaruka, a piggery, a plantation, a school and even a taxi in Honiara. Most of these ventures have collapsed.

The panning of alluvial gold was also an encouraged activity for members of the movement. This brought them into direct conflict with the large mining companies. However, most of the land owners where the mining companies operate in Central Guadalcanal, are also Moro Movement members and so are benefiting from the mining.

== Social and cultural activities ==
The movements supporters gathered in large numbers at Makaruka for meetings of the entire group or for feasts. During these feasts, most but not all would wear traditional dress: fibre skirt called 'bosa' for women and tree bark or ‘Kabilato’ for men.

Other activities include the collection of traditional artefacts and ‘sacred stones’ to be kept at the House of Antiquities. Traditional artefacts include carvings, traditional tools such as stone axes and weapons. The collection of ‘sacred stones’ was very frenetic during the 1970s. The stones were brought from the Offering Altars of ‘Peo of the different clans of the movement. The Peo signify the ownership of the land by the clan who owns a peo in the area. They were collected in the HoA. These activities were opposed by the Roman Catholic Church in the area who said that the stones were associated with spirits of ancestors and were being worshipped. While Sio Bubuli claimed that the stones were kept as souvenirs or mementoes just like the Church keeps objects such as the Eucharist. Ben Magore who looked after the House in the 1980s 90s stated that the stones are being kept until Moro releases the stones’ stories and histories. This future time will depend upon Moro and the members of the movement.

The movement, like Maasina Ruru also had factions of cargo cult behaviour. In 1965, Diki Valerago and Pada Valebaibai in the Suta area went to Koleula and told people to await cargo from America. Sio Bubuli, Moro and others were against this activity.

== Recent developments ==
After the 1977 general elections, David Valusa of the MM was elected into the National Parliament. It was a bigger achievement of the movement and great boost when Valusa lead the country into independence. On 7 July 1978. In Honiara, the Movement were invited to put on a cultural show at the independence ceremonies.

After independence, Valusa was an important figure in the movement but when Ezekiel Alebua from the anti-moro area of Avuavu was victorious in the 1980 election. From 1980 – 84, Alebua gained favour in the movement by helping Moro m villages, for example water supply to Makaruka and Komuvaolu, and a Copra Buying Point at Haimarao including Longgu and Nago villages. Provincial Fisheries were improved at Marau. In 86 when EA was elected PM.

Gaena alu Movement

In September 1985, Chief Moro and his supporters celebrated 3 decades of the movement at Turarana, by taking a new name. The celebrations were attended by many guests including government officials, the British High Commissioner Mr. Stansfield and his wife.

The new name is defined differently by different people. Some refer to the Octopus with 8 hands, others the 8 rays of the sun. Most people still use Moro Movement.

== See also ==
- Maasina Rule
