= COVID-19 pandemic in Solomon Islands =

- Map of the COVID-19 pandemic in Solomon Islands (as of 24 March 2022) 1,000+ Confirmed cases 100-999 Confirmed cases 10–99 Confirmed cases 1–9 Confirmed cases No confirmed cases
- Disease: COVID-19
- Pathogen: SARS-CoV-2
- Location: Solomon Islands
- First outbreak: Wuhan, China
- Index case: Honiara
- Arrival date: 3 October 2020
- Confirmed cases: 25,954
- Deaths: 199
- Fatality rate: 0.77%
- Vaccinations: 254,352 (fully vaccinated)

The COVID-19 pandemic in Solomon Islands was part of the worldwide pandemic of coronavirus disease 2019 (COVID-19) caused by severe acute respiratory syndrome coronavirus 2 (SARS-CoV-2). The virus was confirmed to have reached Solomon Islands on 3 October 2020.

== Background ==
A novel coronavirus that caused a respiratory illness was identified in Wuhan City, Hubei Province, China, in December 2019, and was reported to the World Health Organization (WHO) on 31 December 2019, which confirmed its concern on 12 January 2020. WHO declared the outbreak a Public Health Emergency of International Concern on 30 January, and a pandemic on 11 March.

The case fatality rate of COVID-19 is much lower than that of SARS, a related disease which emerged in 2002, but its transmission has been significantly greater, leading to a much greater total death toll.

== Timeline ==
Cases

Deaths

=== 2020 ===
On 27 March 2020, Prime Minister Manasseh Sogavare suspended all flights into the country, and declared a precautionary state of emergency in Honiara, by which most entertainment venues would be closed (churches were exempt from the order). On 3 April, the government stepped up checks on incoming visitors, and introduced restrictions on visitors who had visited countries deemed high risk. On 31 March, Franco Rodie, the permanent secretary of the Ministry of Education and Human Resources Development, ordered the closure of all schools in the country.

On 5 April, the Queen of Solomon Islands addressed the Commonwealth in a televised broadcast, in which she asked people to "take comfort that while we may have more still to endure, better days will return". She added, "we will be with our friends again; we will be with our families again; we will meet again".

On 3 October, it was announced that COVID-19 had reached Solomon Islands. On that date, Prime Minister Manasseh Sogavare announced that a student repatriated from the Philippines had tested positive for COVID-19 upon his arrival in the capital, Honiara. The patient is asymptomatic, and tested negative for the disease prior to his repatriation. The student was among 400 Solomon Islanders stranded in the Philippines whom the government had planned to repatriate. Eighteen others tested positive for the virus in the Philippines while awaiting repatriation. Two more cases were confirmed on 11 and 15 October, both individuals were students who were on the same flight as the first case, and were asymptomatic.

Four more cases were confirmed on 27 October, who were soccer players based in the UK. On November 3, five cases were confirmed, four of whom were local footballers and one a Korean national. On November 9, 3 more cases of were confirmed, bringing the total to 16 cases. One of them belonged to the original group from the Philippines and the other two were footballers who had returned from the United Kingdom; in addition, a fifth recovered was confirmed. On November 24, one more case was confirmed, bringing the total to 17 cases.

On December 4, test results for 3 foreigners who were detained with their two yachts for alleged illegal entry to the borders of the territory, came back negative.

=== 2021 ===
On February 8, 2021, one more case was confirmed, bringing the total to 18 cases. A handful of cases were recorded for the rest of 2021, bringing to total to 24.

== Statistics ==
=== Cases by province ===
Provinces	Cases	Recovered	Deaths	References
Central	1,030		4	
Choiseul	482		1	
Guadalcanal	796	29	18	
Honiara	8,132		103	
Isabel	1,092	34	7	
Makira-Ulawa	1,216	2	4	
Malaita	1,196		26	
Renbel and Bellona	238		1	
Temotu	7		0	
Western	1,692		14	
10/10	15,881	14,797	178	
Last update 7 May 2022

=== New cases per day ===
View source data.

== See also ==
- COVID-19 pandemic
- COVID-19 pandemic in Oceania
- Solomon Islands
