= Malaita Eagle Force =

Solomon Islands militant group

The Malaita Eagle Force was a militant organisation, originating in the island of Malaita, in the Solomon Islands. It was formed in the early 2000s and soon crossed over to Honiara, the capital of Solomon Islands.

It was set up during 'The Tension' in the Solomons, which were mainly centred on Guadalcanal, to defend diasporic Malaitans in Guadalcanal and the property of Malaitans that have left the island. Their spokesperson was Andrew Nori and their media reports were entitled "The Eagles View Point".

The force was mainly engaged in fighting the Isatabu Freedom Movement and the Solomon Islands government, which enacted the Regional Assistance Mission to Solomon Islands in response. One of its rebel leaders was Jimmy Rasta. Andrew Nori has also been described as one of its early leaders, and was the spokesman for the Eagles when they overthrew Prime Minister Bartholomew Ulufa'alu's government in June 2000. Another leading figure during the tensions was Charles Dausabea.

In 1999 the MEF took over the role of military police in Honiara. They overprinted the current definitive stamps that had been seized from the post office, with the words "Malaita Eagle Force", to indicate they were in power. However, these stamps were never officially issued because the Malaita Eagle Force were disarmed after the Townsville Peace Agreement.
