= History of Solomon Islands =

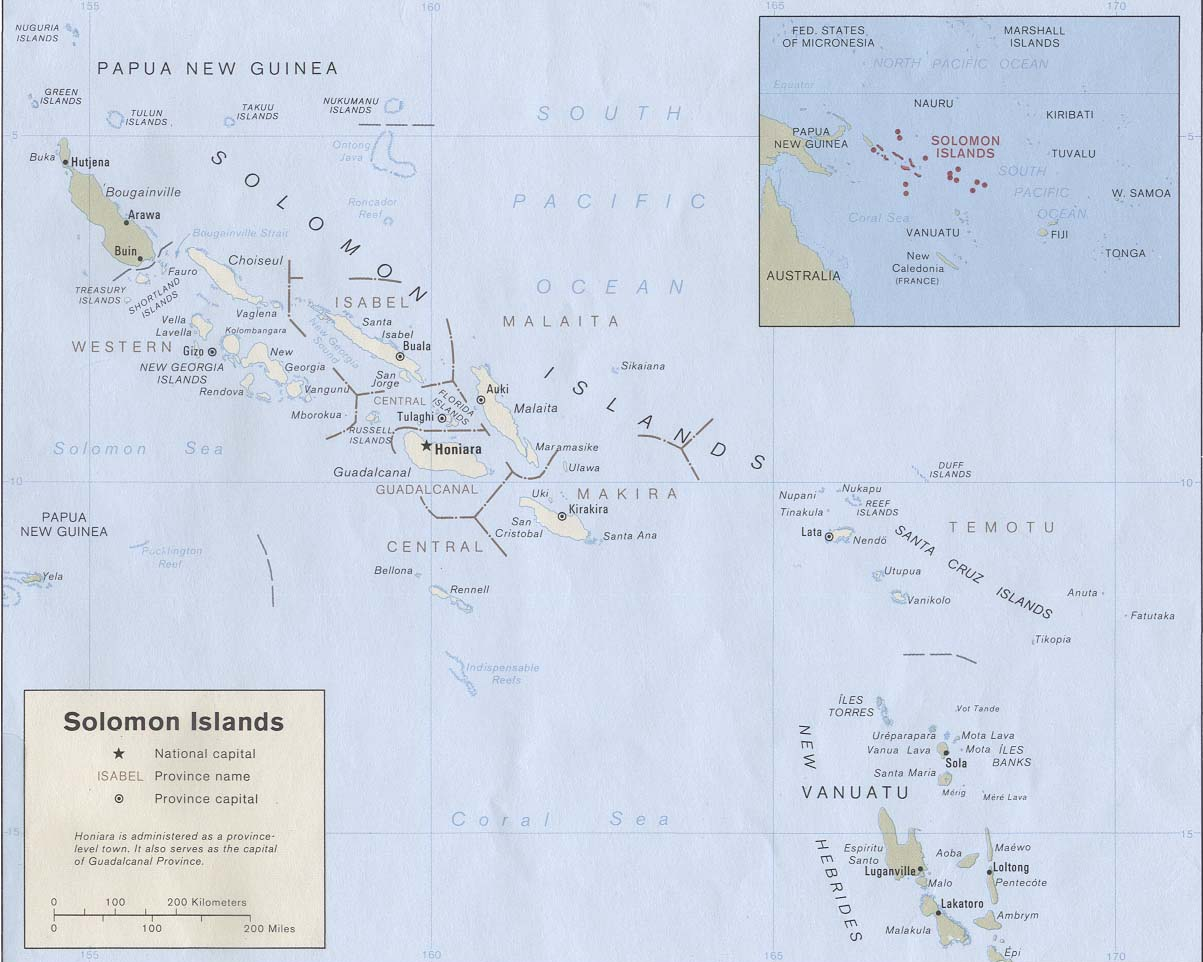
Map of Solomon Islands, circa 1989.

Solomon Islands is a sovereign state in the Melanesia subregion of Oceania in the western Pacific Ocean. This page is about the history of the nation state rather than the broader geographical area of the Solomon Islands archipelago, which covers both Solomon Islands and Bougainville Island, a province of Papua New Guinea. For the history of the archipelago not covered here refer to the former administration of the British Solomon Islands Protectorate, the North Solomon Islands and the History of Bougainville.

== Earliest inhabitants in Solomon Islands ==
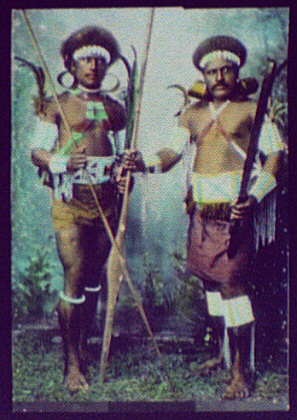
Two warriors in battle dress (1895)

The human history of Solomon Islands begins with the first Papuan settlement at least 30,000 years ago from New Guinea. They represented the furthest expansion of humans into the Pacific until the expansion of Austronesian-language speakers through the area around 4000 BC, bringing new agricultural and maritime technology. Most of the languages spoken today in Solomon Islands derive from this era, but some thirty languages of the pre-Austronesian settlers survive. Most of the people that settled there back then were Papuans (see East Papuan languages).

There are preserved numerous pre-European cultural monuments in Solomon Islands, notably Bao megalithic shrine complex (13th century AD), Nusa Roviana fortress and shrines (14th – 19th century), Vonavona Skull island – all in Western province. Nusa Roviana fortress, shrines and surrounding villages served as a hub of regional trade networks in 17th – 19th centuries. Skull shrines of Nusa Roviana are sites of legends. Better known is Tiola shrine – site of legendary stone dog which turned towards the direction where enemy of Roviana was coming from. This complex of archaeological monuments characterises fast development of local Roviana culture, through trade and head hunting expeditions turning into regional power in 17th – 18th centuries.

== European contact ==
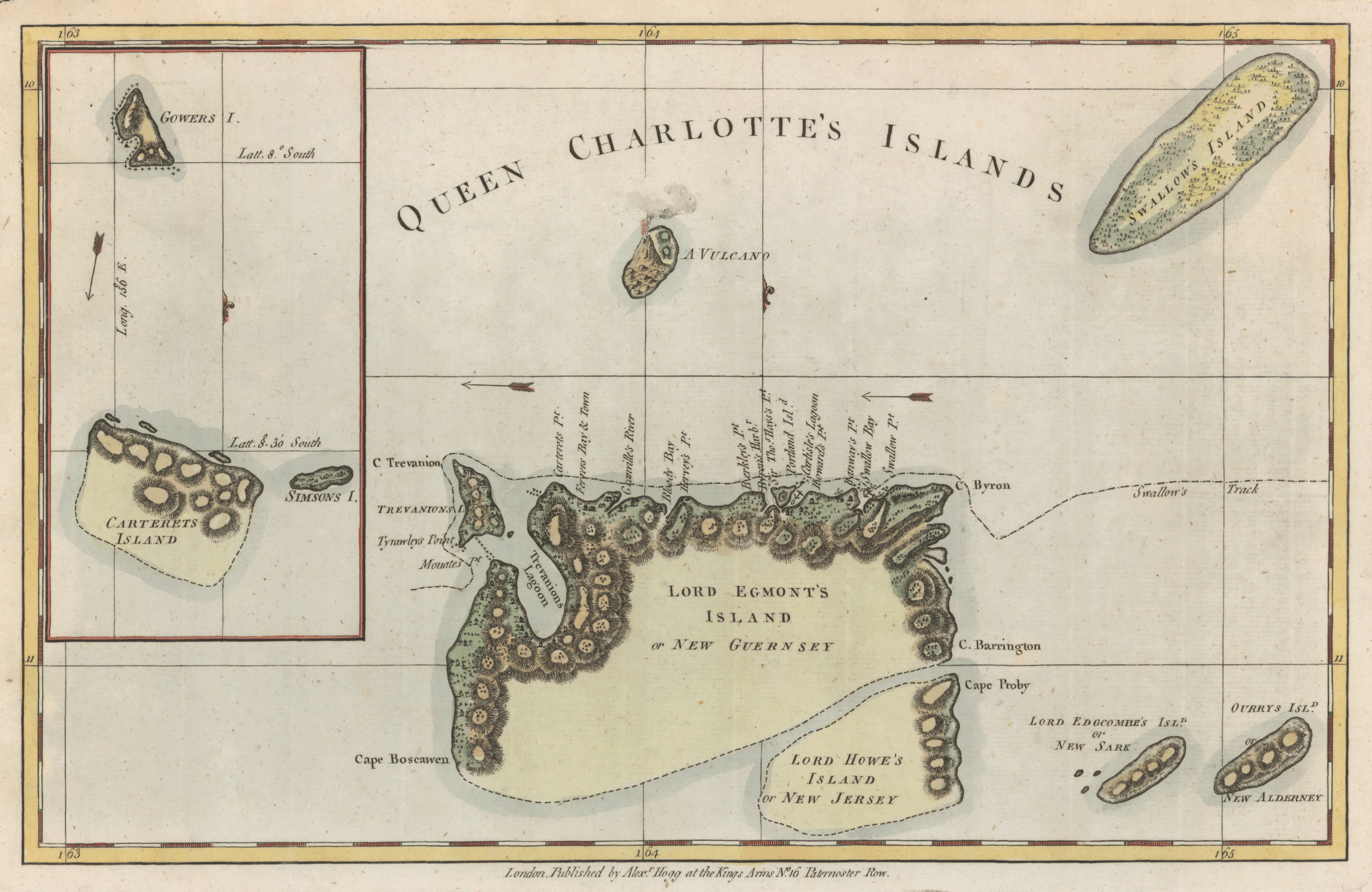
Map of Queen Charlotte's Islands (Santa Cruz Islands) in the Solomon Islands. From George William Anderson’s A New, Authentic and Complete Collection of Voyages Around the World, Undertaken and Performed by Royal Authority(London, 1784)

Ships of the Spanish explorer Álvaro de Mendaña de Neira first sighted Santa Isabel island on 7 February 1568. Finding signs of alluvial gold on Guadalcanal, Mendaña believed he had found the source of King Solomon's wealth, and consequently named the islands "The Islands of Solomon".

In 1595 and 1605 Spain again sent several expeditions to find the islands and establish a colony. However, these were unsuccessful. In 1767, Commander Philip Carteret of HMS Swallow rediscovered the Santa Cruz Islands and Malaita. Later, Dutch, French and British navigators visited the islands; their reception was often hostile.

Christian missionaries began visiting the Solomons from the 1840s, beginning with an attempt by French Catholics under Jean-Baptiste Epalle to establish a mission on Santa Isabel Island, which was abandoned after Epalle was killed by islanders in 1845. Anglican missionaries began arriving from the 1850s, followed by other denominations, over time gaining a large number of converts.

Museums with significant collections of Solomon Islands artifacts include the Bishop Museum, the Peabody Museum of Salem, South Sea Islands Museum and National Museum of Ireland.

== Colonisation ==
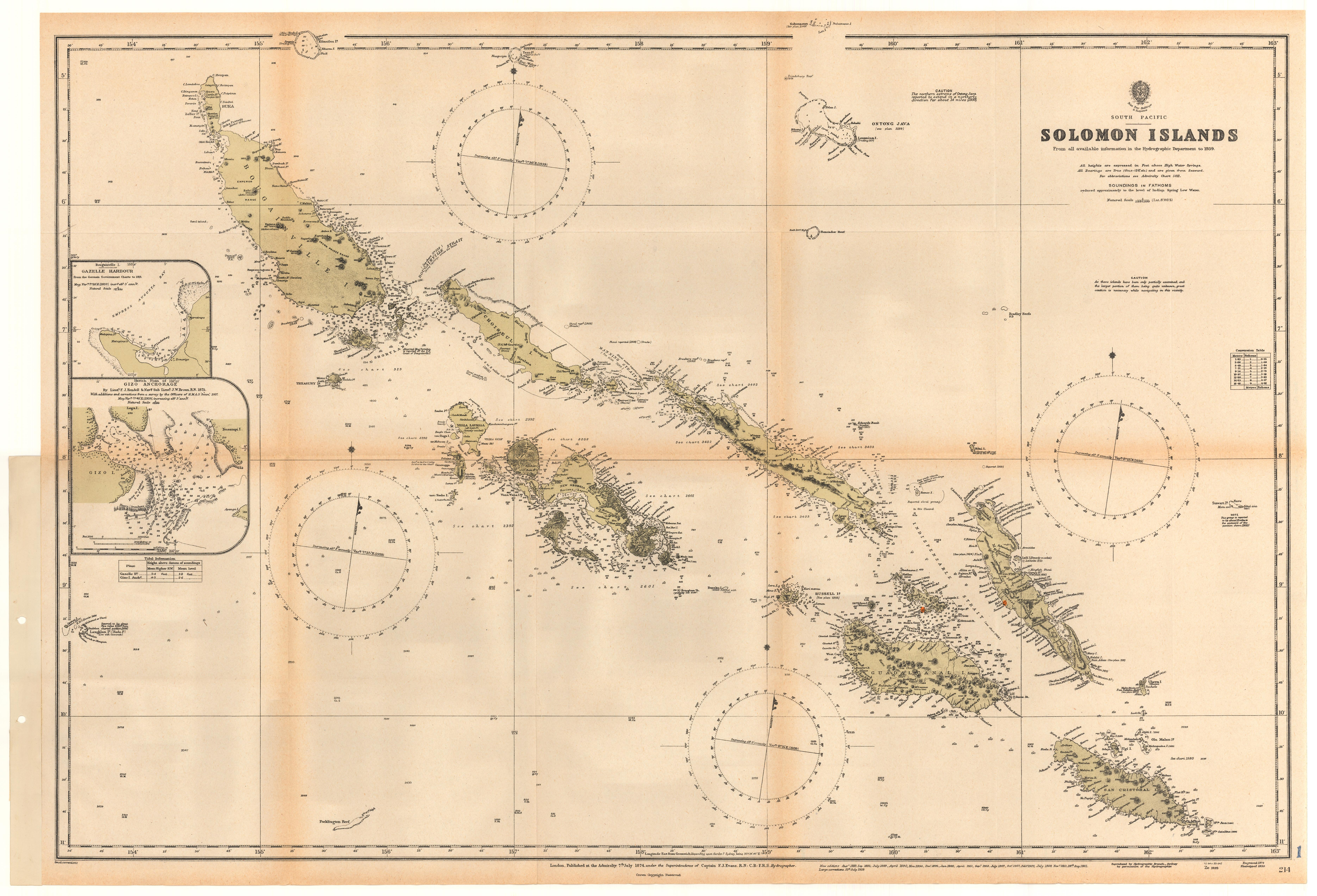
1874 Admiralty Chart of the Solomon Islands

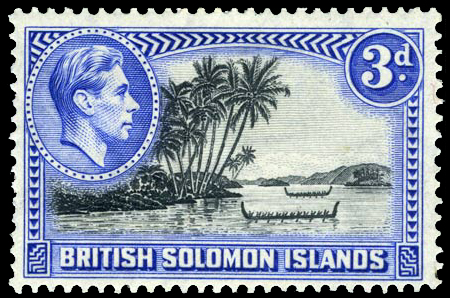
Postage stamp with portrait of King George VI, 1939

Sikaiana, then known as the Stewart Islands, was annexed to the Hawaiian Kingdom in 1856. Hawai'i did not formalize the annexation, and the United States refused to recognize Hawaiian sovereignty over Sikaiana when the United States annexed Hawai'i in 1898.

The colonial ambitions of Imperial Germany led to the establishment of a German protectorate over the North Solomon Islands, which covered parts of what is now Solomon Islands, following the Anglo-German Declarations about the Western Pacific Ocean (1886), which established "spheres of influence" that Germany and the United Kingdom agreed, with Germany giving up its claim to the southern Solomon Islands.

In June 1893, Captain Herbert Gibson of HMS Curacoa, declared the southern Solomon Islands a British protectorate. The protectorate was declared largely in response to the actions of the government of the Australian colony of Queensland, which was actively encouraging the recruitment of Kanakas labourers from the islands, and also in response to concerns around French annexation of the islands. John Bates Thurston, the High Commissioner for the Western Pacific, was a leading advocate of the protectorate.

Although notionally under the jurisdiction of the High Commission, steps were not taken to establish British authority for several years. Thurston visited the islands in 1894, but believed there were no suitable local authorities with which to negotiate terms of the proctectorate – unlike in the Gilbert and Ellice Islands where the protectorate had been proclaimed with the support of local chiefs and local laws remained in force. Some in the Colonial Office believed that annexation of the islands to British New Guinea (BNG) was inevitable, a proposal supported by New Guinea's administrator William MacGregor.

In 1897, the Colonial Office formally proposed that responsibility for the Solomon Islands be transferred to the Australian colonies, possibly following their intended federation. A similar arrangement had been agreed with regard to British New Guinea, where the Australian colonies financed the BNG administration and the lieutenant-governor was subordinate to the governor of Queensland. The Australian premiers rejected the proposal at the 1897 Colonial Conference, as they were unwilling to meet the financial burden of establishing an administration for the Solomon Islands.

The Colonial Office appointed Charles Morris Woodford as the Resident Commissioner in the Solomon Islands on 17 February 1897. He was directed to control the labour trade operating in the Solomon Island waters and to stop the illegal trade in firearms. Arthur Mahaffy was appointed as the Deputy Commissioner to Woodford in January 1898. In January 1900, Mahaffy established a government station at Gizo, as Woodford considered Mahaffy’s military training as making him suitable for the role of suppressing headhunting in New Georgia and neighbouring islands.

In 1898 Britain annexed the Santa Cruz and the Rennell and Bellona Islands. In 1900, under the terms of the Treaty of Berlin (14 November 1899), Germany transferred Choiseul, Santa Isabel, the Shortlands and Ontong Java Atoll Islands to the British Solomon Islands Protectorate, but retained Bougainville and its surrounding islands. Germany granted this claim in exchange for the British giving up all claims to Western Samoa.

In 1927 District Commissioner William R. Bell was killed on Malaita, along with a cadet named Lillies and 13 Solomon Islanders in his charge. A massive punitive expedition, known as the Malaita massacre, ensued; at least 60 Kwaio were killed, nearly 200 detained in Tulagi (the protectorate capital), and many sacred sites and objects were destroyed or desecrated. Basiana, who had killed Bell, was hanged publicly on 29 June 1928.

== World War II ==
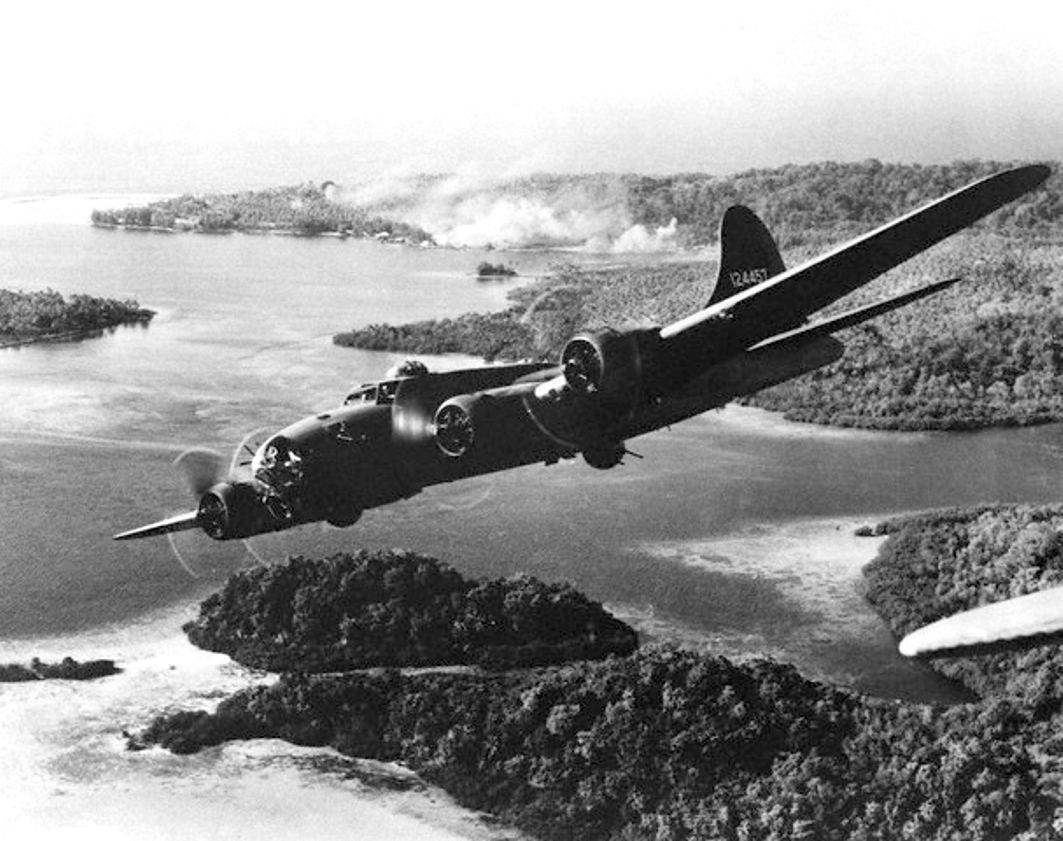
American B-17 bombers over Gizo.

Japanese forces occupied the North Solomon Islands, part of the Australian Territory of New Guinea, in January 1942, going South to Tulagi. The counter-attack was led by the United States; the 1st Division of the US Marine Corps landed on Guadalcanal and Tulagi in August 1942. Some of the most bitter fighting of World War II took place on the islands for almost three years.

Tulagi, the seat of the British administration on the island of Nggela Sule in Central Province was destroyed in the heavy fighting following landings by the US Marines. Then the tough battle for Guadalcanal, which was centred on the capture of the airfield, Henderson field, led to the development of the adjacent town of Honiara as the United States logistics centre.

=== Biuku Gasa and Eroni Kumana ===
Islanders Biuku Gasa (deceased 2005) and Eroni Kumana (Gizo) (deceased 2014) were indigenous Allied scouts during the war. They became famous when they were noted by National Geographic for being the first men to find the shipwrecked John F. Kennedy and his crew of the PT-109 using a traditional dugout canoe. They suggested the idea of using a coconut which was later kept on the desk of the president to write a rescue message for delivery. Their names had not been credited in most movie and historical accounts, and they were turned back before they could visit President Kennedy's inauguration, though the Australian coastwatcher would also meet the president.

Gasa and Kumana were interviewed by National Geographic in 2002, and can be seen on the DVD of the television special. They were presented a bust by Max Kennedy, a son of Robert F. Kennedy. The National Geographic had gone there as part of an expedition by Robert Ballard, who found the remains of the PT-109. The special was called The Search for Kennedy's PT 109.

Ambassador Caroline Kennedy met John Koloni, the son of Kumana, and Nelma Ane, daughter of Gasa at a ceremony in August 2023 in Honiara to mark the 80th anniversary of the battle of Guadalcanal. She also visited the places that her father had swum after the sinking of PT 109.

=== War consequences ===
The impact of the war on islanders was profound. The destruction caused by the fighting and the longer-term consequences of the introduction of modern materials, machinery and western cultural artefacts, transformed traditional isolated island ways of life. The reconstruction was slow in the absence of war reparations and with the destruction of the pre-war plantations, formerly the mainstay of the economy. Significantly, Solomon Islanders' experience as labourers with the Allies led some to a new appreciation of the importance of economic organisation and trade as the basis for material advancement. Some of these ideas were put into practice in the early post-war political movement "Maasina Ruru" – often corrupted to "Marching Rule".

== Post war (1945–1978) ==
In 1956 a movement for social economic and political improvement using co-operatives economic enterprises in combination with a regard for custom and tradition to synthesise a new social order called Moro Movement began on Guadalcanal.

Stability was restored during the 1950s, as the British colonial administration built a network of official local councils. On this platform Solomon Islanders with experience on the local councils started participation in central government, initially through the bureaucracy and then, from 1960, through the newly established Legislative and Executive Councils. Positions on both Councils were initially appointed by the High Commissioner of the British Protectorate but progressively more of the positions were directly elected or appointed by electoral colleges formed by the local councils. The first national election was held in 1964 for the seat of Honiara, and by 1967 the first general election was held for all but one of the 15 representative seats on the Legislative Council (the one exception was the seat for the Eastern Outer Islands, which was again appointed by electoral college).

Elections were held again in 1970 and a new constitution was introduced. The 1970 constitution replaced the Legislative and Executive Councils with a single Governing Council. It also established a 'committee system of government' where all members of the Council sat on one or more of five committees. The aim of this system was to reduce divisions between elected representatives and the colonial bureaucracy, provide opportunities for training new representatives in managing the responsibilities of government.

It was also claimed that this system was more consistent with the Melanesian style of government. However this was quickly undermined by opposition to the 1970 constitution and the committee system by elected members of the council. As a result, a new constitution was introduced in 1974 which established a standard Westminster form of government and gave the Islanders both Chief Ministerial and Cabinet responsibilities. Solomon Mamaloni became the country's first Chief Minister in July 1974.

== Independence (1978) ==
As late as 1970, the British Protectorate did not envisage independence for Solomon Islands in the foreseeable future. Shortly thereafter, the financial costs of supporting the Protectorate became more trying, as the world economy was hit by the first oil price shock of 1973. The imminent independence of Papua New Guinea (in 1975) was also thought to have influenced the Protectorate's administrators.

Outside of a very small educated elite in Honiara, there was little in the way of an indigenous independence movement in the Solomons. Self-government was granted in January 1976 and after July 1976, Sir Peter Kenilorea became the Chief Minister who would lead the country to independence. Independence was granted on 7 July 1978, and Kenilorea automatically became the country's first Prime Minister.

=== Ethnic violence (1999–2003) ===
Solomon Islands conflict
Date	1998 – 2003
Location	Guadalcanal & Malaita, Solomon Islands
Result	Military stalemate: Townsville Peace Agreement; Regional Assistance Mission to Solomon Islands

Belligerents
Isatabu Freedom Movement	Malaita Eagle Force

Commanders and leaders
Harold Keke	Jimmy Lusibaea

Before WWII the provincial capital of Guadalcanal was located at Aola, further down the coast from the present capital, Honiara. That area was then still occupied by the tribal owners of the land. Unfortunately for them Point Cruz had a deep-water harbour and was only a few miles away from the Guadalcanal Plains, where Henderson airfield was built by the Americans during WWII. The landowners accepted the need for such military effort based on their land, presuming it would be returned to them afterwards. In the meantime they moved out, over to the Weather Coast on the opposite side of the island, settling in and around an area called Bambanakira. But they were never compensated. Efforts to resolve this issue as late as 1998 by Ezekiel Alebua, then Guadalcanal Premier, were thwarted and for just a few million dollars ($SBD). Ethnic bias within the bureaucracy and authorities at the time was well known. As well, in the late 90s suburban development had been accelerating on the outskirts of Honiara, whole suburbs of squatters mainly of Malaitan origin. Exacerbating the problem, the police had refused to properly investigate a growing series of violent murders, all of Guadalcanal men in and around Honiara. In early 1999 long-simmering tensions between the local Guale people on Guadalcanal and more recent migrants from the neighbouring island of Malaita erupted into violence. The 'Guadalcanal Revolutionary Army', later called Isatabu Freedom Movement (IFM), began terrorising Malaitans in the rural areas of the island to make them leave their homes. About 20,000 Malaitans fled to the capital and others returned to their home island; Guale residents of Honiara fled. The city became a Malaitan enclave.

Meanwhile, the Malaita Eagle Force (MEF) was formed to uphold Malaitan interests. The Government appealed to the Commonwealth Secretary General for assistance. The Honiara Peace Accord was agreed on 28 June 1999. Despite this apparent success the underlying problems remained unresolved and had already resulted in the unconfirmed death or serious injury of 30,000 civilians. The accord soon broke down and fighting broke out again in June 2000.

Malaitans took over some armouries at their home island and Honiara and helped by that, on 5 June 2000 the MEF seized the parliament by force. Through their spokesman Andrew Nori, they claimed that the government of the then Prime Minister, Bartholomew Ulufa'alu, had failed to secure compensation for loss of Malaitan life and property. Ulufa’alu was forced to step down.

On 30 June 2000 Parliament elected by a narrow margin a new Prime Minister, Manasseh Sogavare. He established a Coalition for National Unity, Reconciliation and Peace, which released a program of action focused on resolving the ethnic conflict, restoring the economy and distributing the benefits of development more equally. However, Sogavare's government was deeply corrupt and its actions led to the downward economic spiral and the deterioration of law and order.

The conflict was foremost about access to land and other resources and was centered on Honiara. Since the beginning of the civil war it is estimated that 100 have been killed. About 30,000 refugees, mainly Malaitans, had to leave their homes, and economic activity on Guadalcanal was severely disrupted.

Continuing civil unrest led to an almost complete breakdown in normal activity: civil servants remained unpaid for months at a time, and cabinet meetings had to be held in secret to prevent local warlords from interfering. The security forces were unable to reassert control, largely because many police and security personnel were associated with one or another of the rival gangs.

In July 2003 the Governor General of Solomon Islands issued an official request for international help, which was subsequently endorsed by a unanimous vote of the parliament. Technically, only the Governor General's request for troops was necessary. However, the government then passed legislation to provide the international force with greater powers and resolve some legal ambiguities.

On 6 July 2003, in response to a proposal to send 300 police and 2,000 troops from Australia, New Zealand, Fiji and Papua New Guinea to Guadalcanal, warlord Harold Keke announced a ceasefire by faxing a signed copy of the announcement to the Solomons Prime Minister, Allan Kemakeza. Keke ostensibly leads the Guadalcanal Liberation Front, but has been described as marauding bandits based on the isolated southwestern coast (Weather Coast) of Guadalcanal. Despite this ceasefire, on 11 July 2003 the Solomon Islands Broadcasting Corporation broadcast unconfirmed reports that supporters of Harold Keke razed two villages.

In mid-July 2003, the Solomons parliament voted unanimously in favour of the proposed intervention. The international force began gathering at a training facility in Townsville. In August 2003, an international peacekeeping force, known as the Regional Assistance Mission to Solomon Islands (RAMSI) and Operation Helpem Fren, entered the islands. Australia committed the largest number of security personnel, but with substantial numbers also from other South Pacific Forum countries such as New Zealand, Fiji, and Papua New Guinea (PNG). It acts as an interim police force and is responsible for restoring law and order in the country because the Royal Solomon Islands Police force failed to do so for a variety of reasons. Peacekeeping forces have been successful in improving the country's overall security conditions, including brokering the surrender of a notorious warlord Harold Keke in August 2003.

In 2006, riots broke out following the election of Snyder Rini as Prime Minister, destroying part of Chinatown and displacing more than 1,000 Chinese residents; the large Pacific Casino Hotel was also totally gutted. The commercial heart of Honiara was virtually reduced to rubble and ashes. Three National Parliament members, Charles Dausabea, Nelson Ne'e, and Patrick Vahoe, were arrested during or as a result of the riots. The Regional Assistance Mission to Solomon Islands (RAMSI), the 16-country Pacific Islands Forum initiative set up in 2003 with assistance from Australia, intervened, sending in additional police and army officers to bring the situation under control. A vote of no confidence was passed against the Prime Minister. Following his resignation, a five-party Grand Coalition for Change Government was formed in May 2006, with Manasseh Sogavare as Prime Minister, quelling the riots and running the government. The military part of RAMSI was withdrawn in 2013 and rebuilding took shape.

In 2009, the government is scheduled to set up a Truth and Reconciliation Commission, with the assistance of South African Archbishop Desmond Tutu, to "address people’s traumatic experiences during the five-year ethnic conflict on Guadalcanal".

The government continues to face serious problems, including an uncertain economic outlook, deforestation, and malaria control. At one point, prior to the deployment of RAMSI forces, the country was facing a serious financial crisis. While economic conditions are improving, the situation remains unstable.

=== 2021 unrest ===
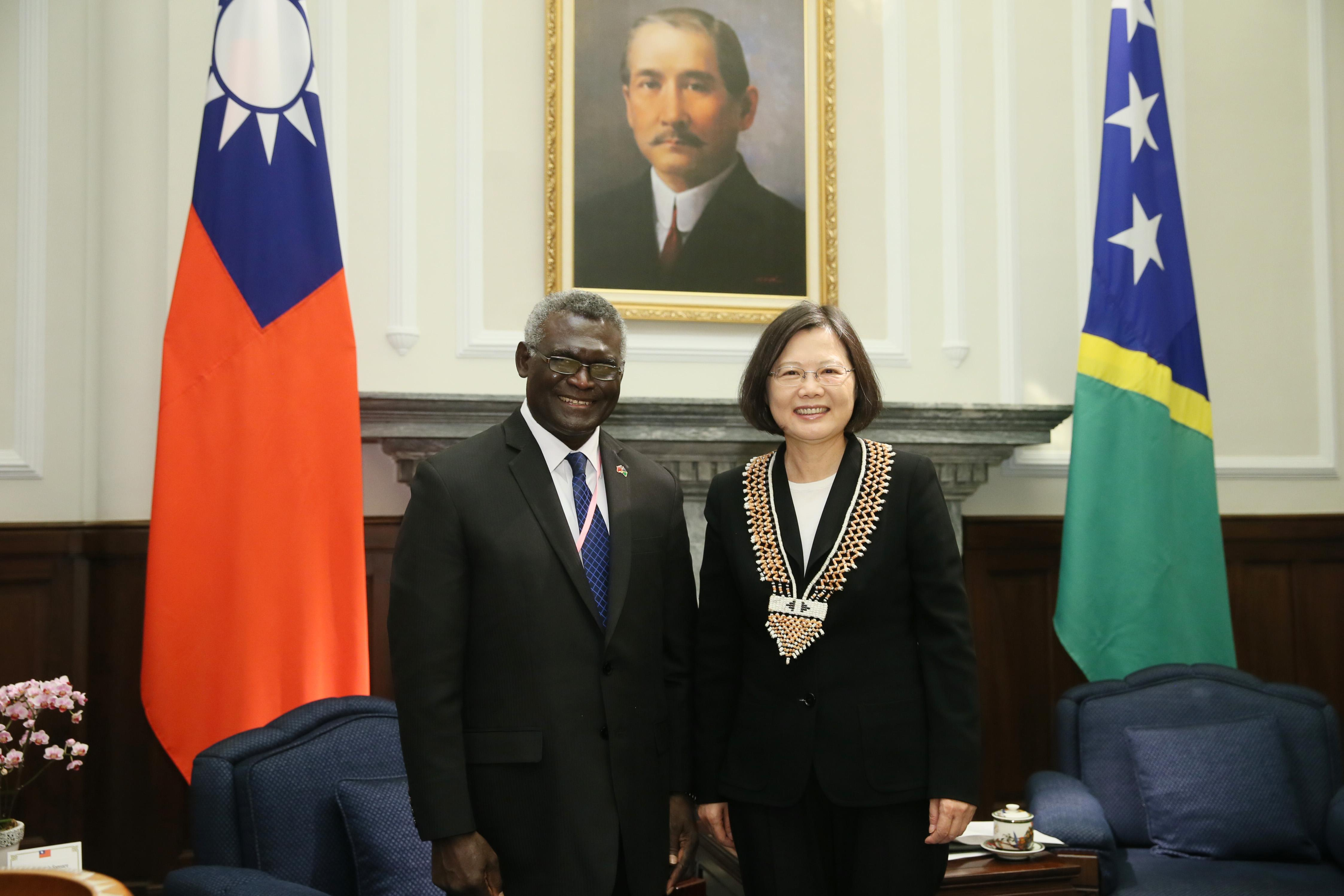
Prime Minister Manasseh Sogavare with Taiwanese President Tsai Ing-wen in July 2016

In 2019, the central government under Prime Minister Manasseh Sogavare withdrew recognition of the Republic of China (Taiwan) and established relations with the mainland People's Republic of China. Malaita Province, however, continued to be supported by Taiwan and the United States, the latter sending US$25 million of aid to the island in 2020. The premier of Malaita Province, Daniel Suidani, also held an independence referendum in 2020 which the national government has dismissed as illegitimate. Rising unemployment and poverty, worsened by the border closure during the COVID-19 pandemic, have also been cited as a cause of the unrest. Chinese businesses were also accused of giving jobs to foreigners instead of locals.

The protests were initially peaceful, but turned violent on 24 November 2021 after buildings adjoining the Solomon Islands Parliament Building were burnt down. Schools and businesses were closed down as police and government forces clashed with protesters. Violence escalated as Honiara's Chinatown was looted. Most of the protesters came from Malaita Province.

Australia responded to the unrest by deploying Australian Federal Police and Australian Defence Force personnel following a request from the Sogavare government under the Australia–Solomon Islands Bilateral Security Treaty. Papua New Guinea, Fiji and New Zealand also sent peacekeepers.

=== Since 2024 ===
In May 2024, Jeremiah Manel was elected as the Solomon Islands new prime minister to succeed Manasseh Sogavare.

== Cyclones ==
In 1992, Cyclone Tia struck the island of Tikopia, wiping out most housing and food crops. In 1997, the Government asked for help from the US and Japan to clean up more than 50 sunken World War II shipwrecks polluting coral reefs and killing marine life.

In December 2002, Severe Tropical Cyclone Zoe struck the island of Tikopia and Anuta, cutting off contact with the 3,000 inhabitants. Due to funding problems, the Solomon Islands government could not send relief until the Australian government provided funding.

=== Cyclone Ita ===
Animated infrared satellite loop of Cyclone Ita on 8 April developing off the southeast coast of Papua New Guinea.

In April 2014 the islands were struck by the tropical low that later became Cyclone Ita. Throughout the Solomons, at least 23 people were killed while up to 40 others remained unaccounted for as of 6 April. An estimated 49,000 people were affected by the floods, of whom 9,000 were left homeless.

As the precursor tropical low to Ita affected the Islands, local authorities issued heavy flood warnings, tropical disturbance and cyclone watches. Nearly two days of continuous heavy rains from the storm caused flash flooding in the Islands. Over a four-day span, more than 1,000 mm (39 in) fell at the Gold Ridge mine in Guadalcanal, with 500 mm (20 in) falling in a 24‑hour span. The Matanikau River, which runs through the capital city Honiara, broke its banks on 3 April and devastated nearby communities. Thousands of homes along with the city's two main bridges were washed away, stranding numerous residents. The national hospital had to evacuate 500 patients to other facilities due to flooding. Graham Kenna from Save the Children stated that, "the scale of destruction is like something never seen before in the Solomon Islands." According to Permanent Secretary Melchoir Mataki, the majority of homes destroyed in Honiara were built on a flood plain where construction was not allowed.

Severe flooding took place on Guadalcanal. Immediately following the floods, Honiara and Guadalcanal were declared disaster areas by the Solomon Government. Debris left behind by the floods initially hampered relief efforts, with the runway at Honiara International Airport blocked by two destroyed homes. Food supplies started running low as the Red Cross provided aid to the thousands homeless. The airport was reopened on 6 April, allowing for supplies from Australia and New Zealand to be delivered. Roughly 20 percent of Honiara's population relocated to evacuation centers as entire communities were swept away. There were fears that the flooding could worsen an already ongoing dengue fever outbreak and cause outbreaks of diarrhea and conjunctivitis.

New Zealand offered an immediate NZ$300,000 in funds and deployed a C-130 Hercules with supplies and emergency response personnel. Australia donated A$250,000 on 6 April and sent engineers and response teams to aid in relief efforts. On 8 April, Australia increased its aid package to A$3 million while New Zealand provided an additional NZ$1.2 million. Taiwan provided US$200,000 in funds.

== See also ==
- History of Oceania
- Politics of Solomon Islands
- Prime Minister of Solomon Islands
