= Wellington (disambiguation) =

Wellington is the capital city of New Zealand.

Wellington may also refer to:

== People ==
- Wellington (given name), a list of people
- Wellington (surname), a list of people
- Wellington (footballer), a list of Brazilian footballers with the mononym Wellington
- Duke of Wellington (title), including a list of titleholders

== Places ==
=== Australia ===
==== New South Wales ====
- Wellington, New South Wales

==== Northern Territory ====
- Wellington Range, Northern Territory

==== Tasmania ====
- Wellington Park, Tasmania, a locality
  - Wellington Park, a protected area
  - Wellington Range
  - Mount Wellington (Tasmania)

==== Victoria ====
- Shire of Wellington

==== South Australia ====
- Wellington, South Australia

==== Western Australia ====
- Wellington Forest, Western Australia, a locality in the Shire of Dardanup
- Wellington Mill, Western Australia, a locality in the Shire of Dardanup
- Wellington Dam Hydro Power Station, a hydroelectric power station in Western Australia
- Wellington National Park, a national park in Western Australia

=== Canada ===
==== Places ====
- Wellington, Newfoundland and Labrador
- Wellington, Nova Scotia, in the Halifax Regional Municipality
- Wellington, Yarmouth, Nova Scotia
- Wellington, Queens, Nova Scotia, in the Region of Queens Municipality
- Wellington, Prince Edward Island
- Wellington Parish, New Brunswick
- Wellington County, Ontario, which encompasses the townships of Centre Wellington, Ontario and Wellington North, Ontario
- Wellington, Ontario, a town in Prince Edward County
- Rural Municipality of Wellington No. 97, Saskatchewan
- Wellington, Edmonton, Alberta
- Wellington, British Columbia, Nanaimo Regional District
- Wellington Bay, Nunavut, Canada

==== Electoral districts ====
- Wellington (federal electoral district), a defunct electoral district of the House of Commons of Canada in Ontario
- Wellington (Manitoba provincial electoral district), an electoral district of Manitoba
- Wellington (Ontario provincial electoral district), a defunct electoral district of Ontario

=== Chile ===
- Wellington Island, Magallanes Region

=== India ===
- Wellington, Tamil Nadu, a town
- Wellington Cantonment

=== New Zealand ===
- Wellington, New Zealand's capital city
  - Wellington City Council
  - Wellington metropolitan area
  - Wellington Region
  - Wellington Province
  - Wellington (New Zealand electorate)
- Roman Catholic Archdiocese of Wellington

=== South Africa ===
- Wellington, South Africa, a town in Western Cape Province
  - Wellington (House of Assembly of South Africa constituency)

=== United Kingdom ===
==== Settlements ====
- Wellington, Cumbria, a village
- Wellington, Herefordshire, a village
- Wellington, Shropshire, a constituent town of Telford
- Wellington, Somerset, a town from which the title Duke of Wellington is taken

==== Constituencies ====
- Wellington (Shropshire) (UK Parliament constituency)
- Wellington (Somerset) (UK Parliament constituency)

=== United States ===
- Wellington, Alabama, an unincorporated community
- Wellington, Colorado, a Statutory Town
- Wellington, Florida, a village
- Wellington, Illinois, a village
- Wellington, Kansas, a city and county seat
- Wellington, Kentucky, a home rule-class city
- Wellington, Menifee County, Kentucky, an unincorporated community
- Wellington, Maine, a town
- Wellington, Michigan, an unincorporated community
- Wellington, Missouri, a city
- Wellington, Nevada, an unincorporated town
- Wellington, Ohio, a village
- Wellington, Texas, a city and county seat
- Wellington, Utah, a city
- Wellington, Washington, an unincorporated community
- Wellington, Wisconsin, a town
- Wellington Township (disambiguation)
- Wellington Formation, a geologic unit in Kansas and Oklahoma named for Wellington, Kansas

== Businesses ==
- Wellington Fund, a mutual fund from the Vanguard group
- Wellington Management Company, a Boston-based investment management firm
- Wellington Partners Venture Capital, a pan-European venture capital firm
- Wellington Piano Company, a subsidiary of the American Cable Piano Company

== Fictional characters ==
- David Wellington (Homeland), from the series Homeland
- A character in the British comic strip The Perishers
- A character in The Wombles, a series of books and a children's TV series based on them
- A dog in the novel The Curious Incident of the Dog in the Night-Time by Mark Haddon

== Military ==
- HMS Wellington, three Royal Navy ships
- HMNZS Wellington, two Royal New Zealand Navy ships
- Vickers Wellington, British medium bomber used in the Second World War
- Wellington Barrier, a series of fortifications built in Belgium from 1815

== Schools ==
- Wellington College (disambiguation)
- Wellington Institute of Technology, Petone, Lower Hutt, New Zealand
- Wellington Polytechnic, now part of the Pukeahu Wellington campus of Massey University, New Zealand, also formerly known as the Wellington School of Design and Wellington Technical School
- Wellington High School (disambiguation)
- Wellington School (disambiguation)

== Transportation ==
- Wellington station (disambiguation)
- Wellington Street (disambiguation)
- A GWR 3031 Class locomotive on the Great Western Railway
- A GWR 4073 Class locomotive on the Great Western Railway
- An SR V "Schools" class locomotive on the Southern Railway

== Other uses ==
- Wellington boot, a type of boot
- Wellington Inn, a public house in York, England
- Wellington Television, a former television station in Wellington, New Zealand

== See also ==
- Wellington North (disambiguation)
- Beef Wellington, a steak dish of English origin
- Fort Wellington, Australia, Northern Territory
- Little Wellington Island, Aisén Region, Chile
- Welington (disambiguation)
- Willingdon (disambiguation)
- Wennington (disambiguation)
- Welly (disambiguation)
