= Underwater hockey in New Zealand =

Victoria versus Western Australia at the 2004 Nationals in Tasmania, Australia.

Underwater hockey has been played in New Zealand since 1964 and is played in all major cities and many smaller towns. As of August 2026, New Zealand is the most successful country at the Underwater Hockey World Championships winning 28 gold medals across the various divisions. New Zealand are current World Champions in the Elite Men's, U-24 Men's and U-24 Women's grades.

== History ==
Underwater Hockey came to New Zealand from South Africa around 1969-1970.

== Regions ==
There are 6 regions for UWH in New Zealand, although since the 2011 Christchurch Earthquake the South Island has combined to form one region at Interzone tournaments.

- Northern; defined as north of the Bombay Hills.
- Mid Northern; defined as the area South of the Bombay Hills and north of a line from Waitara through Taupō to Napier/Hastings, and including all those centers.
- Central; defined as the area in the North Island south of a line from Waitara through Taupō to Napier/Hastings, excluding those centers.
- Top of South; defined as the area in the South Island north of a line from Westport to Kaikōura, and including those centres.
- Mid South; defined as the area south of a line from Westport to Kaikōura, excluding those centres, and north of a line from Haast to Timaru, and including those centres.
- Southern; defined as the area south of a line from Haast to Timaru, excluding those centres.

=== Clubs ===
The Nothern region has 3 active clubs, all are based in Auckland; GI Joes, Pakuranga and Nova.

Mid Nothern has 5 clubs; Eastbay, Hawkes Bay Gannets, Tauranga, Taupō and Waitako

Central has 3 clubs, all based in Wellington; Crocodylus, Phoenix and Knights of McGinnley.

Top of South has 2; Marlborough and Nelson Tasman.

Mid South is the only region with one club; Christchurch.

Southern has 2; Dunedin and Southland.

== Competitions ==
New Zealand Underwater Hockey hosts 4 national tournaments each year, they are; Elite Interzones, u18 Interzones, Club Nationals and Secondary School Nationals. In addition to these there are regional tournaments including; North Island and South Island Club Championships, and Northern Zone and Central Zone Secondary Schools.

Some regions host their own tournaments throughout the year this includes; Dunedin 4-a-sides and Hamilton 4s.

=== Club Nationals ===
The first club Nationals were held in November 1979 at the Lido pool in Palmerston North. It was attended by 18 teams. Auckland teams dominated, and the national title was won by Blue Fins.

In the early years there were A, B and C grades. In 1986? The Premier grade was added, to cater for elite teams that were obviously better than the A grade teams.

A Mixed grade has been offered from 1986, with the rule that at any time there can be only three male players in the water. Each year since 1986 a Women’s grade has also been offered, but there isn't often enough teams to make it up. Teams entering the Women’s grade have been placed in the Mixed grade.

Hosted in early October each year, Club Nationals traditionally has 4 grades; Prem, A, B and C. All grades are mixed Mens and Womens. Previously there has been a Women's grade.

After the 2026 edition Crocodylus is the most successful club in Prem Grade with 17 titles, surpassing Pakuranga.

Club Nationals Winners
Year	Location	Prem	A Grade	B Grade	C Grade	Women's	Mixed
1979	Palmerston North	No grade	Blue Fins	??			
1980	Unknown	No grade					
1981	Lower Hutt	No grade	??				
1982	Unknown	No grade					
1983	Unknown	No grade					
1984	Unknown	No grade					
1985	Unknown	Taita					
1986	Lower Hutt	Taita	Island Bay	Portside B	Hoof Harted		Upper Hutt
1987	Christchurch	Taita					
1988	Lower Hutt	Portside					
1989	Christchurch	Pakuranga				Portside	
1990	Auckland	Pakuranga					
1991	Wellington	Pakuranga					
1992	Christchurch	Pakuranga	Chch A	Chch Varsity			
1993	Rotorua						
1994	Wellington	??	Portside				
1995	Christchurch						
1996	Auckland						
1997	Unknown						
1998	Unknown						
1999	Unknown						
2000	Unknown						
2001	Unknown						
2002	Unknown						
2003	Unknown						
2004	Unknown						
2005	Unknown						
2006	Unknown						
2007	Unknown						
2008	Unknown						
2009	Unknown						
2010	Unknown						
2011	Wellington	Crocodylus	Hamilton	Phoenix	No grade	Dunedin	
2012	Rotorua	Crocodylus	??	??	??	No grade	
2013	Wellington	Crocodylus	??	??	??	No grade	
2014	Rotorua	Crocodylus	??	??	??	No grade	
2015	Wellington	Crocodylus	Dunedin	Fins	Marlborough	No grade	
2016	Rotorua	Crocodylus	Hamilton	East Bay	Marlborough	No grade	
2017	Wellington	Crocodylus	Tauranga	FINS	Crocodylus	No grade	
2018	Rotorua	Pakuranga	Pakuranga	East Bay	Tauranga	No grade	
2019	Wellington	Crocodylus	Pakuranga	Nelsun	East Bay	No grade	
2020	Tauranga	Crocodylus	Tauranga	Fins	Phoenix	No grade	
2021	Event Cancelled due to COVID-19						
2022	Wellington	Crocodylus	Knights of McGinley	Waikato	Malborough	No grade	
2023	Tauranga	Crocodylus	Nelsun	Taupō	Crocodylus	No grade	
2024	Wellington	Crocodylus	Knights of McGinley	Tauranga	Pakuranga	No grade	
2025	Rotorua	Nova	Nelson Tasman	Pakuranga	Knights of McGinley	No grade	
2026	Wellington	Crocodylus	Waikato	Phoenix	Crocodylus	No grade	

=== Secondary School Nationals ===
Secondary School Nationals was first held in 1985 and has been held every year since, except 2020 and 2021 due to COVID-19. It is held during Secondary School winter tournament week, there are 4 grades; Senior Boys, Senior Girls, Junior Boys and Junior Girls. Until 1998 there were only senior grades. In recent times the tournament has been restricted to the top 10 teams in each grade, teams qualify at the Northern and Central Zone qualifier tournaments.

The 25th edition in 2009, holds the Guiness World Record for the Largest Underwater Hockey Tournament. There were 564 total players on 62 teams across four the competitive divisions.

In 2026 the 40th anniversary edition was celebrated.

Secondary Schools Nationals Winners
Year	Edition	Location	Senior Boys	Senior Girls	Junior Boys	Junior Girls
1985	1st	Wellington	Wellington High School	Wellington East Girls' College	No Event	No Event
1986	2nd	Wellington	Glendowie College	Queen Margaret College	No Event	No Event
1987	3rd	Wellington	Wellington High School	Howick College	No Event	No Event
1988	4th	Wellington	Wellington College	Queen Margaret College	No Event	No Event
1989	5th	Wellington	Wellington College	Wellington Girls' College	No Event	No Event
1990	6th	Wellington	Wellington College	Wellington Girls' College	No Event	No Event
1991	7th	Wellington	Wellington College	Unknown	No Event	No Event
1992	8th	Wellington	Wellington College	Queen Margaret College	No Event	No Event
1993	9th	Wellington	Pakuranga College	Queen Margaret College	No Event	No Event
1994	10th	Wellington	Marlborough College	Nelson College for Girls	No Event	No Event
1995	11th	Rotorua or Wellington	Marlborough College	Nelson College for Girls	No Event	No Event
1996	12th	Wellington	Wellington College	Hutt Valley High School	No Event	No Event
1997	13th	unknown	Marlborough College	Hutt Valley High School	No Event	No Event
1998	14th	unknown	Wellington College	St Mary's College, Wellington	Wellington College	Epsom Girls Grammar School
1999	15th	unknown	Wellington College	Tauranga Girls' College	Wellington College	Epsom Girls Grammar School
2000	16th	unknown	Wellington College	Epsom Girls Grammar School	Wellington College	Tauranga Girls' College
2001	17th	unknown	Wellington College	Tauranga Girls' College	Hutt International Boys' School	Howick College
2002	18th	unknown	Otumoetai College	Epsom Girls Grammar School	Hutt International Boys' School	Wellington Girls' College
2003	19th	unknown	Hutt International Boys' School	Epsom Girls' Grammar School	Rongotai College	Wellington Girls' College
2004	20th	unknown	Hutt International Boys' School	Epsom Girls' Grammar School	Hutt International Boys' School	Tauranga Girls' College
2005	21st	unknown	Wellington College	Wellington Girls' College	Hutt International Boys' School	Tauranga Girls' College
2006	22nd	unknown	Wellington College	Diocesan School for Girls	Rongotai College	Otumoetai College
2007	23rd	unknown	Hutt International Boys' School	Tauranga Girls' College	Scots College	Otumoetai College
2008	24th	unknown	Glendowie College	Epsom Girls Grammar School	Scots College	Nelson College for Girls
2009	25th	Christchurch	Glendowie College	Epsom Girls Grammar School	Mt Albert Grammar School	Nelson College for Girls
2010	26th	unknown	Scots College	Diocesan School for Girls	Howick College	Tauranga Girls' College
2011	27th	unknown	Wellington College	Diocesan School for Girls	Mt Albert Grammar School	Diocesan School for Girls
2012	28th	unknown	Scots College	Epsom Girls Grammar School	Wellington College	Epsom Girls Grammar School
2013	29th	Auckland	Scots College	Wellington Girls' College	Mahurangi College	Nelson College for Girls
2014	30th	Rotorua	Glendowie College	Wellington Girls' College	Nelson College	Nelson College for Girls
2015	31st	Auckland	Mahurangi College	Nelson College for Girls	Hutt International Boys' School	Epsom Girls Grammar School
2016	32nd	Wellington	Mt Albert Grammar School	Trident High School	Tauranga Boys' College	Diocesan School for Girls
2017	33rd	Tauranga	Tauranga Boys' College	Wellington East Girls' College	Tauranga Boys' College	Epsom Girls Grammar School
2018	34th	Rotorua	Tauranga Boys' College	Mahurangi College	Tauranga Boys' College	Diocesan School for Girls
2019	35th	Wellington	Tauranga Boys' College	Nelson College for Girls	Nelson College	Samuel Marsden Collegiate School
2020	Event Cancelled due to COVID-19					
2021	Event Cancelled due to COVID-19					
2022	36th	Wellington	Glendowie College	Samuel Marsden Collegiate School	Nelson College	Mahurangi College
2023	37th	Auckland	Glendowie College	Mahurangi College	Glendowie College	Mahurangi College
2024	38th	Tauranga	Glendowie College	Nelson College for Girls	Mahurangi College	Nelson College for Girls
2025	39th	Wellington	Wellington College	Nelson College for Girls	Hutt International Boys' School	Samuel Marsden Collegiate School
2026	40th	Rotorua	Nelson College	Wellington Girls' College	Nelson College	Wellington High School

== National Team ==
=== At the World Championships ===
Elites and Masters
Year	Championship	Location event	Elite		Masters	
Year	Championship	Location event	Men	Women	Men	Women
1980	1st CMAS World Championship	Canada	?	No event	No event	No event
1982	2nd CMAS World Championship	Australia	2nd	2nd	No event	No event
1984	3rd CMAS World Championship	USA	6th	2nd	No event	No event
1986	4th CMAS World Championship	Australia	3rd	2nd	No event	No event
1988	5th CMAS World Championship	Netherlands	4th	1st	No event	No event
1990	6th CMAS World Championship	Canada	4th	2nd	No event	No event
1992	7th CMAS World Championship	New Zealand	2nd	3rd	2nd	No event
1994	8th CMAS World Championship	France	6th	?	?	No event
1996	9th CMAS World Championship	South Africa	3rd	4th	?	No event
1998	10th CMAS World Championship	USA	4th	?	?	?
2000	11th CMAS World Championship	Australia	?	?	3rd	3rd
2002	12th CMAS World Championship	Canada	2nd	?	?	?
2004	13th CMAS World Championship	New Zealand	1st	?	?	?
2006	14th CMAS World Championship	United Kingdom	1st	5th	DNP	
2007	Disputed 15th World Championship (Part of 1st CMAS Games)	Italy	DNP			
2008	Alternative 15th World Championship (1st WAA World Championships)	South Africa	2nd	4th	?	?
2009	16th World Championship	Slovenia	DNP			
2011	17th CMAS World Championship	Portugal	DNP	3rd	Held Separately	
2011	Master's World Championship	Netherlands	Held Separately		DNP	?
2013	18th CMAS World Championship	Hungary	2nd	1st	?	?
2016	19th CMAS World Championship	South Africa	5th	2nd	DNP	
2018	20th CMAS World Championship	Canada	1st	1st	8th	DNP
2023	21st CMAS World Championship	Australia	1st	5th	3rd	3rd

‡ DNP= Did not participate

Age Group Worlds
Year	Championship	Location	U-19		U-23/24	
Year	Championship	Location	Men	Women	Men	Women
2002	12th Worlds	Canada	Unknown	DNP	No Event	
2004	13th Worlds	New Zealand	1st	1st	No Event	
2006	14th Worlds	United Kingdom	1st	1st	No Event	
2007	15th Worlds - CMAS*	Italy	DNP		No Event	
2008	15th Worlds - WAA*	South Africa	2nd	1st	No Event	
2011	1st Age Groups	Netherlands	2nd	1st	DNP	1st
2013	18th Worlds and 2nd Age Groups	Hungary	2nd	1st	1st	1st
2015	3rd Age Groups	Spain	1st	2nd	3rd	5th
2017	4th Age Groups	Australia	3rd	1st	4th	1st
2019	5th Age Groups	United Kingdom	1st	1st	3rd	1st
2024	6th Age Groups	Malaysia	1st	3rd	1st	1st
2026	7th Age Groups	Turkiye	4th	2nd	1st	1st

Inter Continential Championships
Year	Championship	Location	Elite		Masters	
Year	Championship	Location	Men	Women	Men	Women
2023	1st CMAS Inter Continential Championship Asia/Oceania	Malaysia	1st	1st	1st	2nd

== See also ==
- Underwater Hockey – Underwater sport of pushing a puck into the opposing goal
- Underwater Hockey World Championships – International event for the sport of Underwater Hockey
- Parakiore Recreation and Sport Centre – Sport facility in Christchurch, New Zealand

== Notes ==
1.There are differing sources for the location of these championships. See: and.
