= Wellington (surname) =

Wellington is a surname. Notable people with the surname include:

- Alex Wellington (1891–1967), Canadian ice hockey player
- Altemont Wellington (born 1934), Jamaican cricketer
- Arthur Wellesley, 1st Duke of Wellington (1769–1852), British commander at Waterloo and Prime Minister
- Arthur Wellesley, 2nd Duke of Wellington (1807–1884), British lieutenant-general
- Arthur M. Wellington (1847–1895), American civil engineer and author
- B. Wellington, Indian politician and Health Minister of Kerala State
- Beatrice Wellington (1907–1971), Canadian Quaker rescuer of Jewish children from pre-World War II Prague
- Ben Wellington (born 1974), English cricketer
- Biff Wellington (1965–2007), Canadian professional wrestler
- Calvin Wellington (born 1995), Welsh rugby league footballer
- Chrissie Wellington (born 1977), English triathlete
- Clement Wellington (1880–1956), Australian cricketer
- David Wellington (author) (born 1971), American author
- David Wellington (director) (born 1963), Canadian film director
- George B. Wellington (1856–1921), New York state senator
- George L. Wellington (1852–1927), U.S. Senator from Maryland
- Harry H. Wellington (1926–2011), Dean of Yale Law School (1975–1985) and of New York Law School (1992–2000)
- Henry Wellesley, 3rd Duke of Wellington (1846–1900), British peer and politician
- Justin Wellington (born 1978), Papua New Guinean international singer
- Lydia Wellington, New York City Ballet dancer
- Orlando Wellington, Ghanaian football manager and coach
- Peter Wellington (born 1957), Australian politician
- Peter Wellington (director), Canadian film and television director
- Roderick Wellington (born 1978), British basketball player
- Renaldo Wellington (born 1999), Jamaican footballer
- Sheena Wellington (born 1944), Scottish singer
- Stephen Wellington (1899–1974), Australian cricketer
- Stuart Wellington, American comedian and bar proprietor
- Ted Wellington (1921–2004), Australian rules footballer
- Terra Wellington, American actress, television personality and author
- Tom Wellington (footballer, born 1894) (1894–1955), Australian footballer for Melbourne
- Tom Wellington (footballer, born 1921) (1921–1998), Australian footballer for Hawthorn
- Valerie Wellington (1959–1993), American singer
- Wilfrid Wellington, Anglican priest in South Africa
