= Tom Wellington =

Tom Wellington may refer to:

- Tom Wellington (footballer, born 1894) (1894–1955), Australian footballer for Melbourne
- Tom Wellington (footballer, born 1921) (1921–1998), Australian footballer for Hawthorn
