= 2021 Solomon Islands unrest =

Political crisis in Solomon Islands

- Date: 24–27 November 2021
- Location: Solomon Islands
- Caused by: Decision by the Solomon Islands Government to switch diplomatic recognition from Taiwan to China; Claimed interference from foreign powers, mainly China; Lack of economic development in Solomon Islands; Corruption; Democratic Backsliding; Government mishandling of the COVID-19 pandemic; Poverty; Lack of job opportunities for local residents; Central government's neglect of infrastructural development on Malaita Island
- Goals: Resignation of Prime Minister Manasseh Sogavare; Restoration of diplomatic relations with the Republic of China (Taiwan)
- Methods: Protests, riots, arson, looting
- Result: Government victory: 36-hour lockdown declared in Honiara on 24 November; Buildings adjoining the Solomon Islands Parliament Building burnt down; Deployment of Australian-led military and police forces

Parties
Government of Solomon Islands; Royal Solomon Islands Police Force; Supported By: Australia; (Australia) Australian Army; 3rd Brigade; 6th Brigade; 17th Brigade; Royal Australian Navy; HMAS Armidale; Royal Australian Air Force; No. 4 Squadron; Australian Federal Police; Fiji; Republic of Fiji Military Forces; Papua New Guinea; Royal Papua New Guinea Constabulary; New Zealand; New Zealand Army; Royal New Zealand Infantry Regiment; New Zealand Police; Royal New Zealand Navy; HMNZS Wellington; Diplomatic support: China	Protesters: Malaita for Democracy

Lead figures
(Solomon Islands) Manasseh Sogavare; (Australia) Scott Morrison; (Fiji) Frank Bainimarama; (Papua New Guinea) James Marape; (New Zealand) Jacinda Ardern	No centralised leadership

Casualties
- Deaths: 3 civilians
- Arrested: 100+

The 2021 Solomon Islands unrest was a series of demonstrations and violent riots in Solomon Islands from 24 to 27 November 2021.

It started off as a peaceful protest against the government's decision to recognize the People's Republic of China over Taiwan. However, it turned violent as protesters attempted to storm the parliament to depose Prime Minister Manasseh Sogavare. Many businesses, especially Chinese businesses located in Honiara's Chinatown, were targeted by protestors, and were burned and looted. A police station was set on fire.

The government responded by deploying the police which used tear gas on the protesters. They also requested the Australian Government for support. As a result, Australia deployed the Australian Federal Police and Defence Force. Papua New Guinea and Fiji dispatched peacekeepers while New Zealand deployed police and troops.

Following the unrest, Prime Minister Sogavare said the "innocent people of Malaita have been lied to by these agents of Taiwan" and described the riots as an "attempted illegal coup". Sogavare resisted calls to resign, and defeated a vote of no-confidence in the parliament on 6 December 2021.

== Background ==
Solomon Islands had historically been in a state of ethnic conflict until 2003, when Australia deployed a peacekeeping mission. The residents of Malaita, the nation's most populous island, have often complained that their island is neglected by the central government.

In 2019, the central government under Sogavare withdrew recognition of Taiwan and established relations with the People's Republic of China. Malaita Province, however, continued to be supported by Taiwan and the United States, the latter sending US$25 million of aid to the island in 2020. The premier of Malaita Province, Daniel Suidani, also held an independence referendum in 2020 which the national government has dismissed as illegitimate. Rising unemployment and poverty, worsened by the border closure during the COVID-19 pandemic, have also been cited as a cause of the unrest. Chinese businesses were also accused of giving jobs to foreigners instead of locals.

== Events ==
The protests were initially peaceful on 24 November, with members of the group "Malaita for Democracy" gathering to protest the Solomon Islands Government's decision to recognize China over Taiwan. They called on Sogavare to address them. After failing to meet with them, witnesses reported that protests turned violent. Protestors attempted to storm the parliament building to depose Sogavare. A 36-hour lockdown was issued, but was defied by protestors on 25 November, when a crowd took to the streets of Honiara's Chinatown. Buildings adjoining the parliament building burnt to the ground. A police station and businesses were set on fire. Police fired upon protesters with tear gas.

Australia responded to the unrest on 25 November by deploying Australian Federal Police and Australian Defence Force personnel. They were requested by the Sogavare government under the Australia–Solomon Islands Bilateral Security Treaty. The Australian Government stated this deployment was to support the Royal Solomon Islands Police Force to maintain order and protect vital infrastructure and would take no position on the internal issues of Solomon Islands. Papua New Guinea agreed to send 34 peacekeepers to help staunch the violence.

By the morning of 27 November, the rioting had largely stopped, with police officers and peacekeeping troops patrolling the streets. Police later announced the discovery of three charred bodies in a burned building in Honiara's Chinatown district and the arrest of over 100 people in relation to the riots.

Opposition leader Matthew Wale filed a no-confidence motion against the Sogavare government on 28 November, with debate scheduled for 6 December. The motion created a potential flashpoint for further unrest.

On 29 November, four people were killed during protests, leading Australia to send police forces and soldiers to supervise.

Fiji dispatched 50 troops on 30 November 2021 to reinforce the Australian Defence Force under the Vuvale Partnership between Australia and Fiji. 120 troops remained on standby in Fiji if needed. New Zealand sent 65 police and troops, with 15 personnel arriving 2 December, and 50 over the following weekend.

On 6 December, Sogavare survived a motion of no confidence in the parliament. 15 voted in support, 32 voted against, and two abstained.

On 14 December, opposition figure John Kwaita was charged with instigating the unrest. The damage of the riots was estimated to be SI$500 million (NZ$91m). As a result of the economic turmoil, emergency supplies were delivered. By 22 December, military presence was scaled down in Honiara, but remained on standby to ensure stability. The Solomon Islands government requested assistance from China. The request was accepted by the Ministry of Foreign Affairs of the People's Republic of China on 24 December, resulting in batons, shields and helmets being supplied to the islands to help with quelling future riots.

== Reactions ==
=== Domestic ===
Sogavare warned the rioters would "face consequences", and resisted calls to resign, saying that if he would be removed, "it will be on the floor of Parliament". He also accused the protesters of being "politically motivated" and, during an interview with the Australian Broadcasting Corporation, blamed "foreign powers" for the unrest.

Wale and Suidani called for Sogavare to step down. The premier of Guadalcanal Province Anthony Veke also strongly denounced the riots.

=== International ===
The government of the People's Republic of China expressed "concern about the attacks" and support for the Solomon Islands government's attempts to "restore order and stability quickly".

Sogavare alleged that countries that did not want the Solomon Islands to establish ties with the People's Republic of China had fed the people of Malaita "false and deliberate lies" about Solomon Islands' shift in diplomatic relations from Taiwan to the People's Republic of China. The Taiwan Ministry of Foreign Affairs stated, "We have nothing to do with the unrest."

Australian prime minister Scott Morrison questioned whether Chinese citizens and businesses were targeted describing the unrest as a "mixed story". Australian foreign minister Marise Payne also stated that there was no indication that foreign countries had stirred up the unrest.

== See also ==
- China–Solomon Islands relations
- Solomon Islands–Taiwan relations
- Cross-Strait relations
- One-China policy
- Regional Assistance Mission to Solomon Islands
