= Wellington Lima =

Wellington Lima may refer to:

- Wellington Lima (acrobat) (born 1979), Brazilian artistic acrobat
- Wellington Lima (footballer) (born 1990), Brazilian footballer
