= Wellington Council (disambiguation) =

Wellington Council is a former local government in New South Wales, Australia.

Wellington Council may also refer to:

- Shire of Wellington, a local government area in Victoria, Australia
- Wellington City Council, a territorial authority in New Zealand
- Wellington Council (Texas), a defunct Boy Scout Council in Texas

== See also ==
- Wellington, New South Wales, the regional town and seat of Wellington Council
- Wellington (disambiguation)
- Greater Wellington Regional Council, New Zealand
