= Wellington (footballer) =

Wellington is the stage name of various Brazilian footballers:

- Wellington Amorim (born 1977), Brazilian football forward
- Wellington Monteiro (born 1978), Brazilian football defensive midfielder
- Wellington (footballer, born June 1981), full name Wellington Damião Nogueira Marinho, Brazilian football centre-back
- Wellington (footballer, born September 1981), full name Wellington Katzor de Oliveira, Brazilian football midfielder
- Wellington (footballer, born January 1982), full name Wellington Pinto Fraga, Brazilian football midfielder
- Wellington (footballer, born June 1982), full name Wellington Dantas de Jesus, Brazilian football midfielder
- Wellington (footballer, born September 1982), full name Wellington da Silva Serezuella, Brazilian football attacking midfielder
- Wellington Paulista (born 1984), Brazilian football striker
- Wellington (footballer, born 1985), full name Wellington Santos da Silva, Brazilian football left-back
- Wellington (footballer, born 1987), full name Wellington Carlos da Silva, Brazilian football striker
- Wellington Silva (footballer, born 1987), Brazilian football forward
- Wellington Adão (born 1988), Brazilian football forward
- Wellington (footballer, born 1988), full name Wellington Luís de Sousa, Brazilian football forward
- Wellington Silva (footballer, born 1988), Brazilian football right-back
- Wellington (footballer, born 1989), full name Wellington Oliveira dos Reis, Brazilian football defender
- Wellington Baroni (born 1989), Brazilian football defender
- Wellington Júnior (born 1989), Brazilian football forward
- Wellington (footballer, born January 1991), full name Wellington Aparecido Martins, Brazilian football defensive midfielder
- Wellington (footballer, born September 1991), full name Wellington da Silva Pinto, Brazilian football centre-back
- Wellington (footballer, born 1992), full name Wellington Nascimento Carvalho, Brazilian football forward
- Wellington Rato (born 1992), Brazilian football midfielder
- Wellington (footballer, born 1993), full name Wellington Cézar Alves de Lima, Brazilian football defensive midfielder
- Wellington Silva (footballer, born 1993), Brazilian football winger
- Wellington (footballer, born 1994), full name Wellington Walter Nogueira, Brazilian football forward
- Wellington (footballer, born 1995), full name Wellington Ferreira Nascimento, Brazilian football centre-back
- Wellington Luís (born 1995), Brazilian football goalkeeper
- Wellington Tim (born 2001), Brazilian football centre-back

== See also ==
- Whelliton (born 1972), Brazilian football forward
- Weligton (born 1979), Brazilian football centre-back
- Tom (footballer, born 1985), full name Wellington Brito da Silva, Brazilian football winger
- Welliton (born 1986), Brazilian football forward
- Wellington (disambiguation)
- Welinton (disambiguation)
