= Peter J. Paulsen House =

Historic house in Iowa, United States

- U.S. National Register of Historic Places
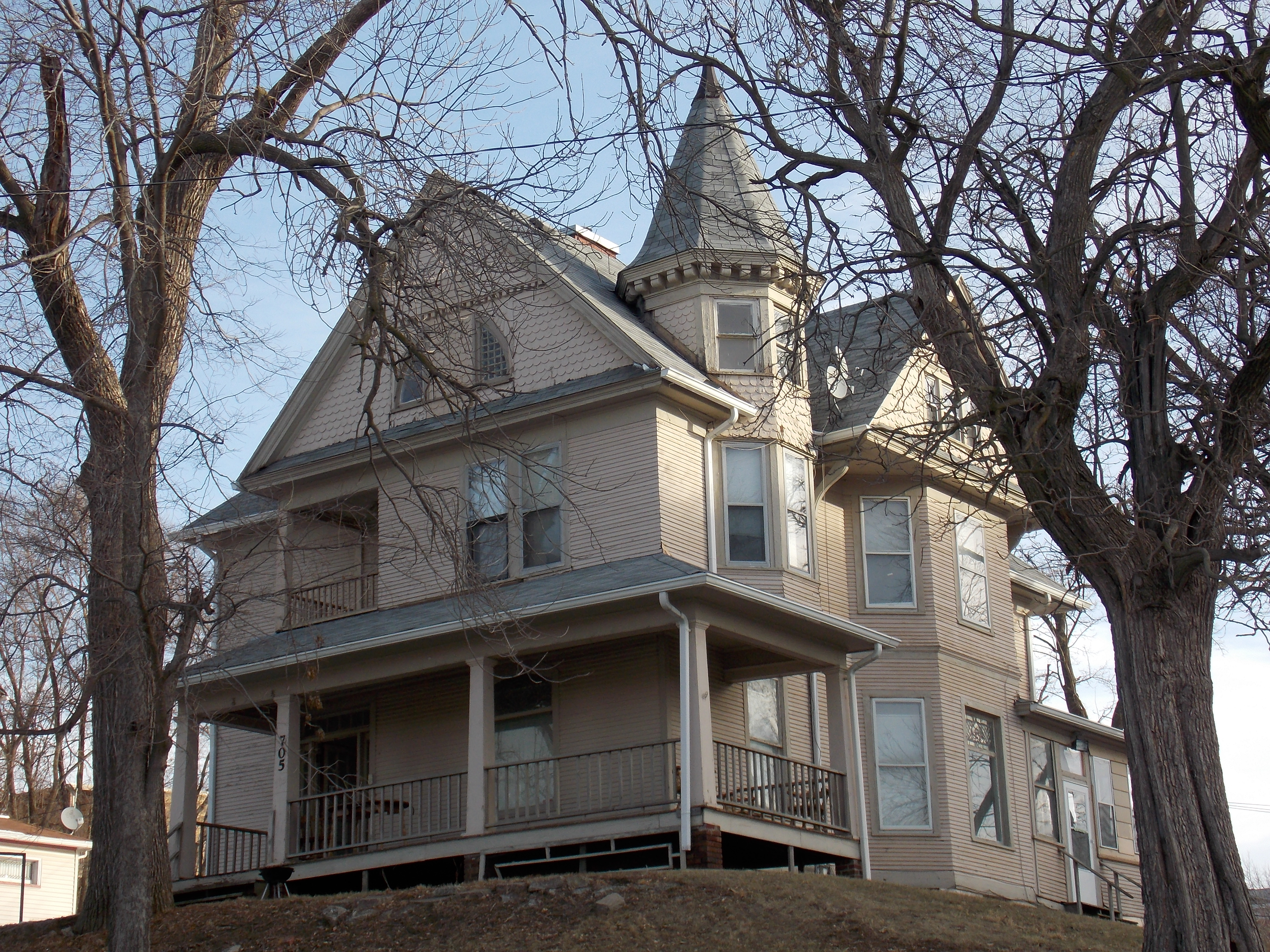

- Location within Iowa Location within the United States
- Location: 705 Main St. Davenport, Iowa
- Coordinates: 41°31′34″N 90°34′31″W
- Built: 1895
- Architectural style: Queen Anne
- MPS: Davenport MRA
- NRHP reference No.: 83002481
- Added to NRHP: July 7, 1983

The Peter J. Paulsen House is a historic building located on the hill above downtown Davenport, Iowa, United States. The Queen Anne style residence was built by Peter J. Paulsen, who operated a grocery store on West Second Street. It exhibits the features that are characteristic of this popular late 19th-century style: an asymmetrical composition, irregular roofscale, and a corner tower with a conical roof. The tower itself rises out of an oriel window on the first and second floors. The Paulsen house also maintains some if its exterior features, including scallop-shaped wall shingles in the gables and narrow clapboards. The south gable also contains a Palladian window and the front gable a semicircular window. The house has been listed on the National Register of Historic Places since 1983.
