= Willingdon =

Willingdon may refer to:

== People ==
- Freeman Freeman-Thomas, 1st Marquess of Willingdon (1866–1941), Governor General of Canada and Viceroy of India

== Places ==
Canada

- Burnaby-Willingdon, a former electoral district for British Columbia, Canada from 1966 to 2009
- Willingdon, Alberta, Canada
- Willingdon (electoral district), a former electoral district in Alberta, Canada from 1940 to 1959
- Willingdon Heights, a neighbourhood in Burnaby, British Columbia, Canada

England

- Willingdon, East Sussex, a village in the parish of Willingdon and Jevington, East Sussex, England
- Willingdon Down, a Site of Special Scientific Interest in Eastbourne, East Sussex, England

India

- Willingdon Airfield, former name of Safdarjung Airport in New Delhi, India
- Willingdon Island, a man-made island located in Kochi, Kerala, India
- Willingdon Hospital, later known as Ram Manohar Lohia Hospital, Delhi
- Willingdon Bridge, later known as Vivekananda Setu, Kolkata

== Other uses ==
- Marquess of Willingdon, a title in the Peerage of the United Kingdom
- Willingdon College, Sangli, Maharashtra, India
- Willingdon Cup, an annual amateur golf team competition among Canada's provinces
- Willingdon Sports Club, a sports club in Mumbai, India
- Willingdon Beauty, given name of the proto-revolutionary boar known as Old Major in George Orwell's Animal Farm

== See also ==
- Wellington (disambiguation)
- Wilmington (disambiguation)
