= Welinton =

Welinton may refer to:

- Welinton (footballer, born 1989), full name Welinton Souza Silva, Brazilian football centre-back
- Welinton Júnior (born 1993), full name Welinton Júnior Ferreira dos Santos, Brazilian football forward
- Welinton (footballer, born 1999), full name Welinton Macedo dos Santos, Brazilian football striker

== See also ==
- Wellington (disambiguation)
