= Welington (disambiguation) =

Wellington is the capital city of New Zealand.

Welington may also refer to:

== Brazilian footballers ==
- Welington (footballer) (Welington Damascena Santos, born 2001), left-back
- Welington Wildy Muniz dos Santos (born 1991), defensive midfielder known as França
- Welington Pereira Rodrigues (born 1986), central defender known as Gum

== Other people ==
- Welington dos Santos (born 1981), Brazilian basketball player known as Nezinho
- Welington Castillo (born April 24, 1987), Dominican baseball catcher known as Beef
- Welington Morais (born 1996), Brazilian shot putter
- Welington de Melo (1946–2016), Brazilian mathematician

== See also ==
- Wellington (disambiguation)
