= Conical roof =

Roof shape

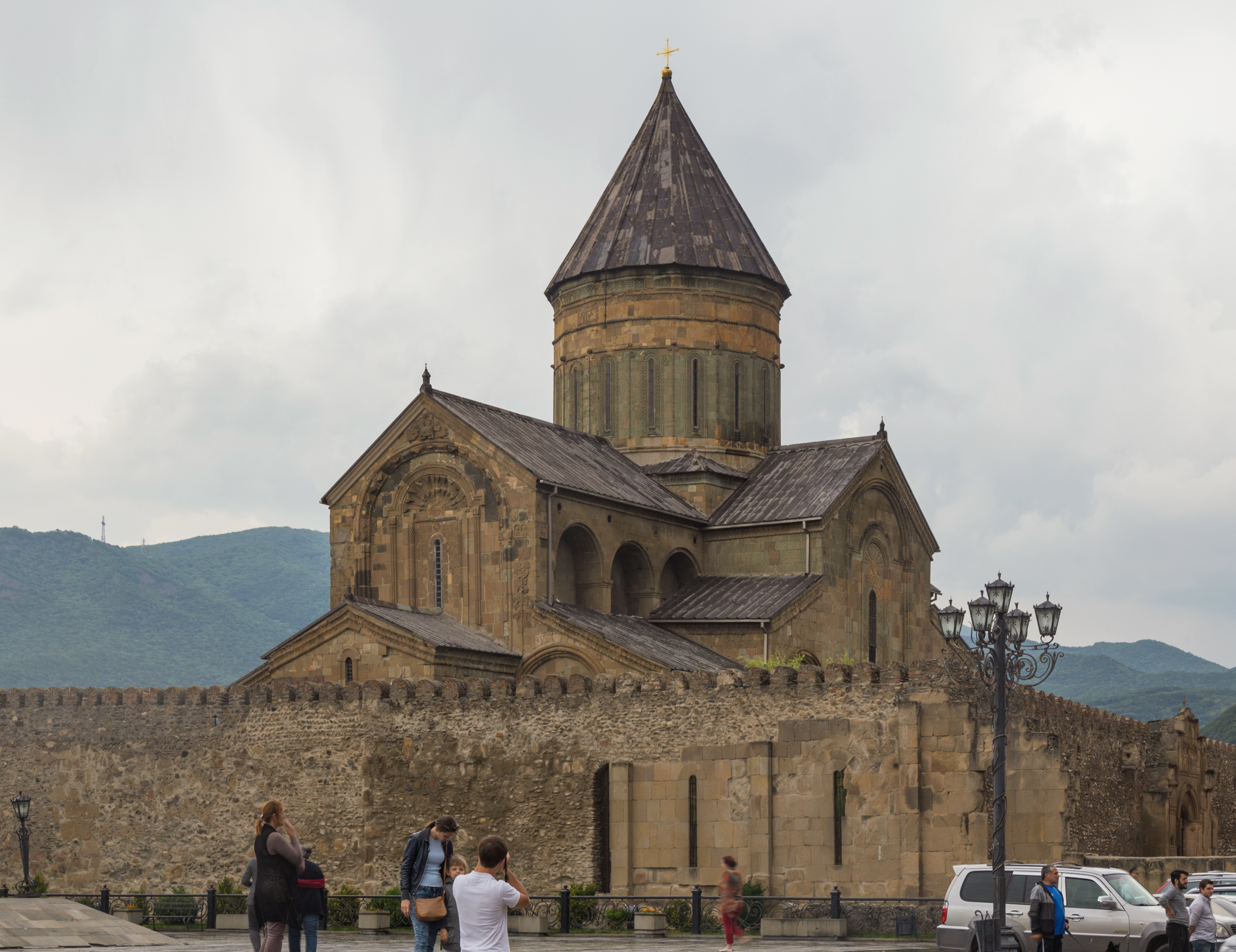
Svetitskhoveli Cathedral, Mtskheta, Georgia

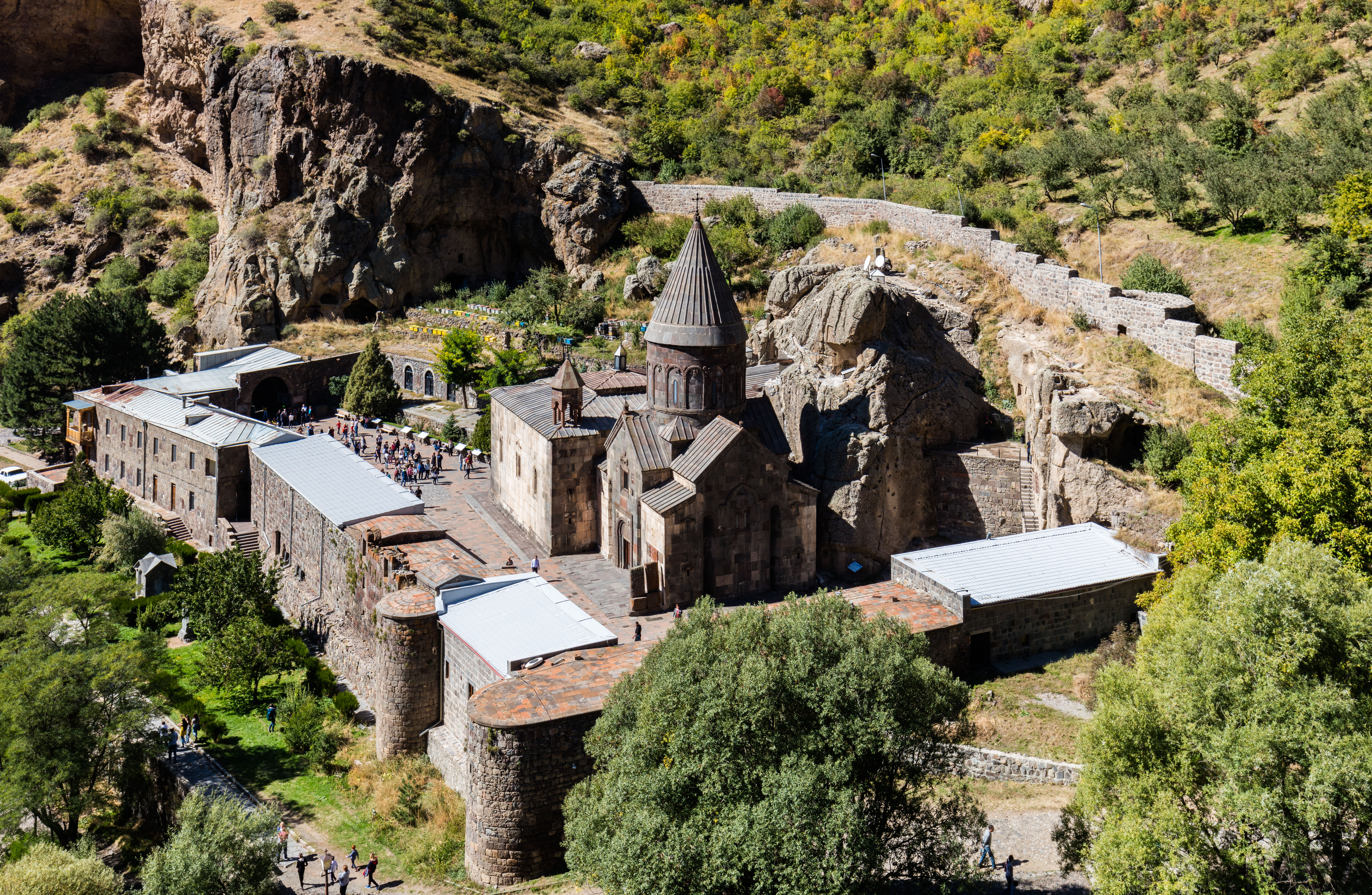
The 13th-century church in the monastery of Geghard, Armenia

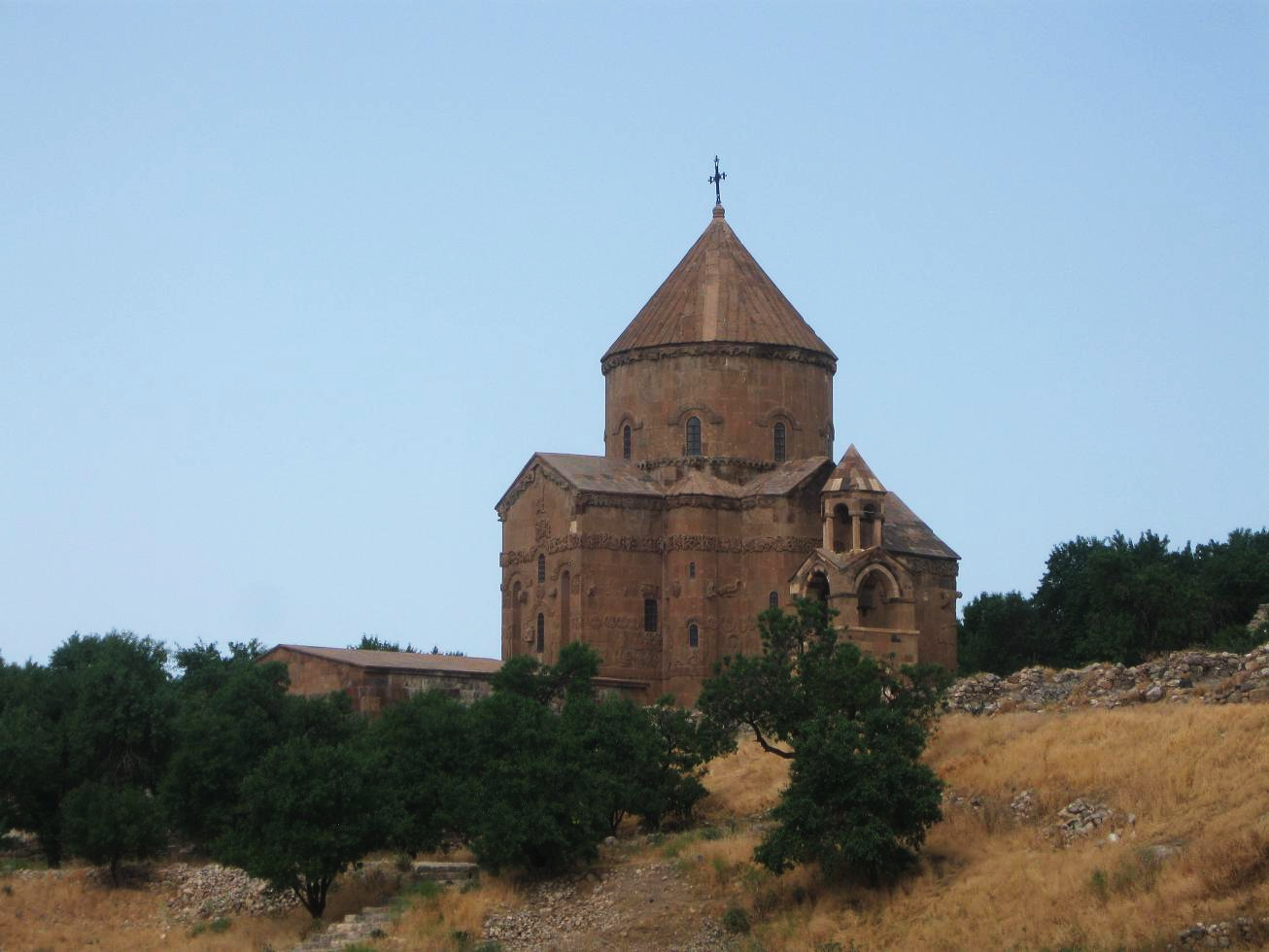
The Armenian Apostolic Cathedral of the Holy Cross on Akdamar Island, Lake Van, Turkey

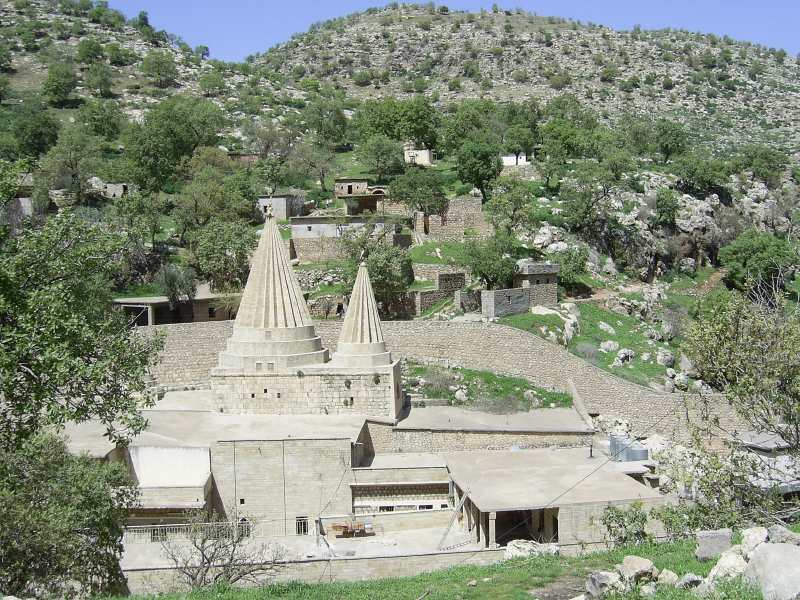
The tomb of Sheikh Adi in Lalish (northern Iraq), the religious center of the Yazidis with holy structures with conical roofs

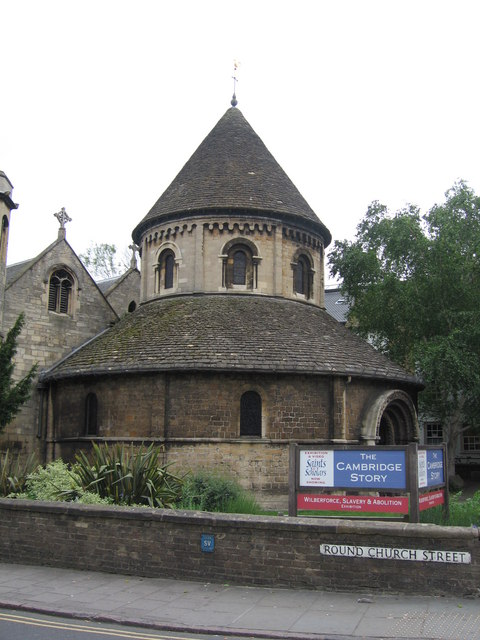
The Round Church, Cambridge, England

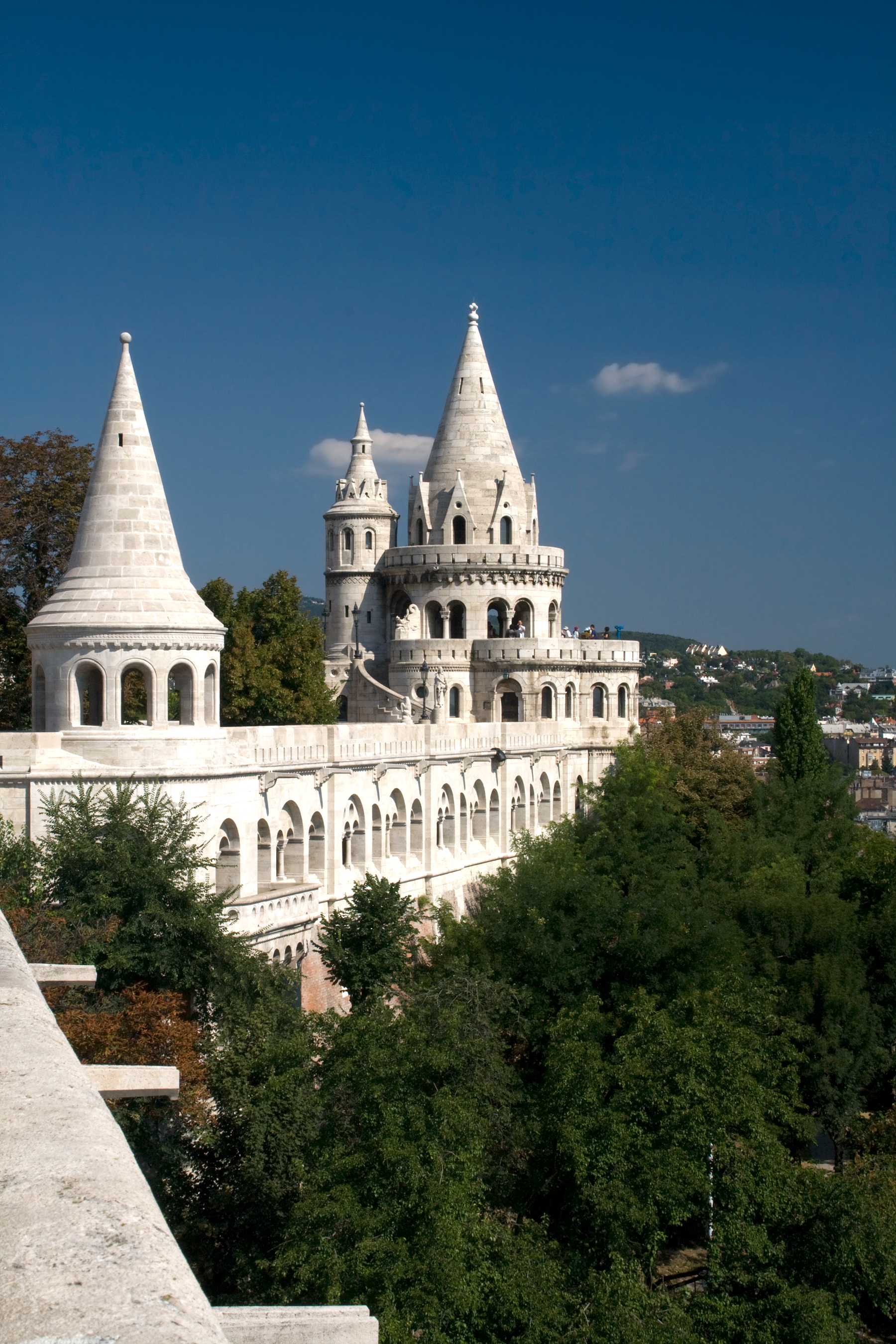
Fisherman's Bastion, Budapest, Hungary

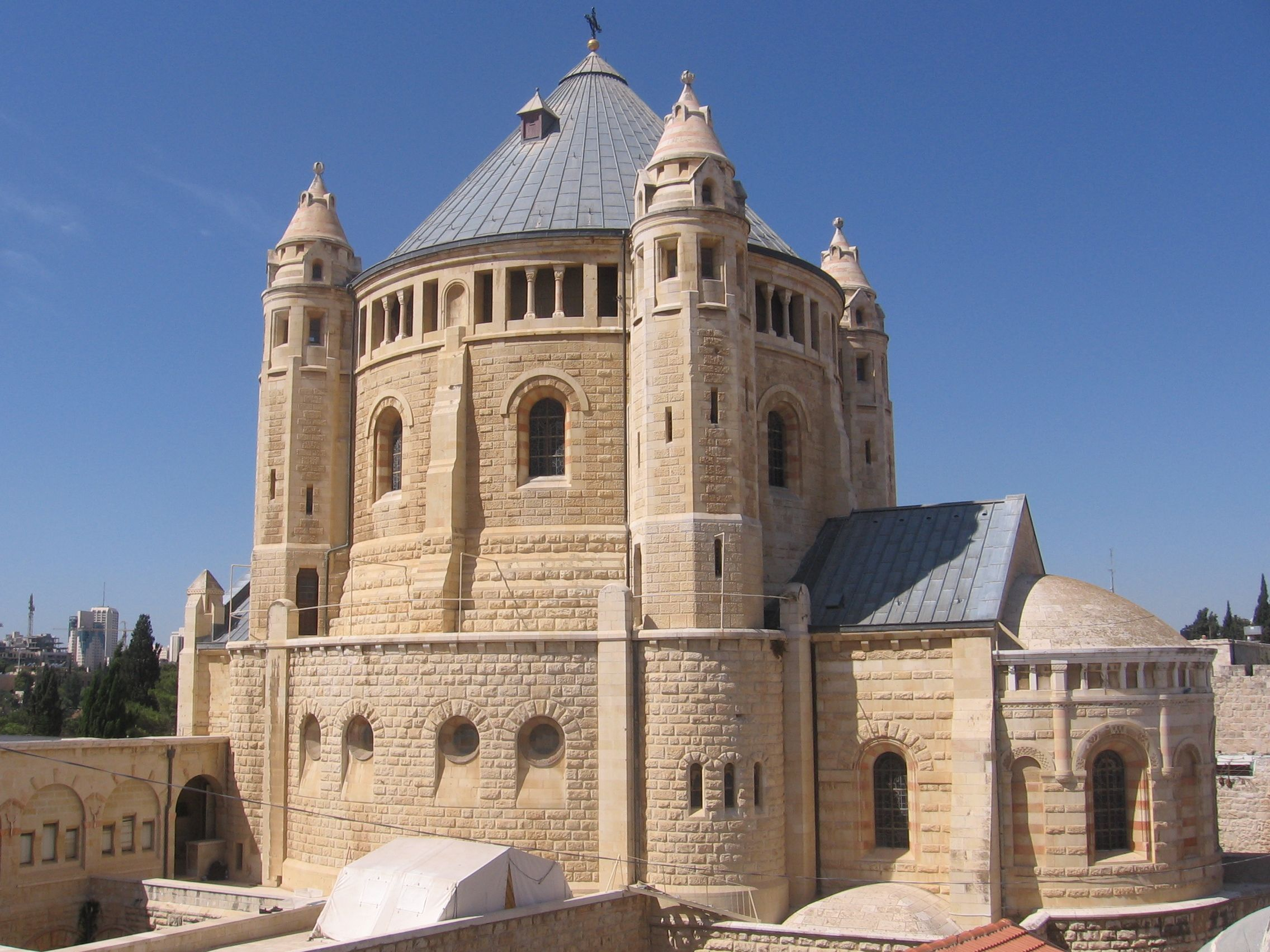
Abbey of the Dormition, Jerusalem

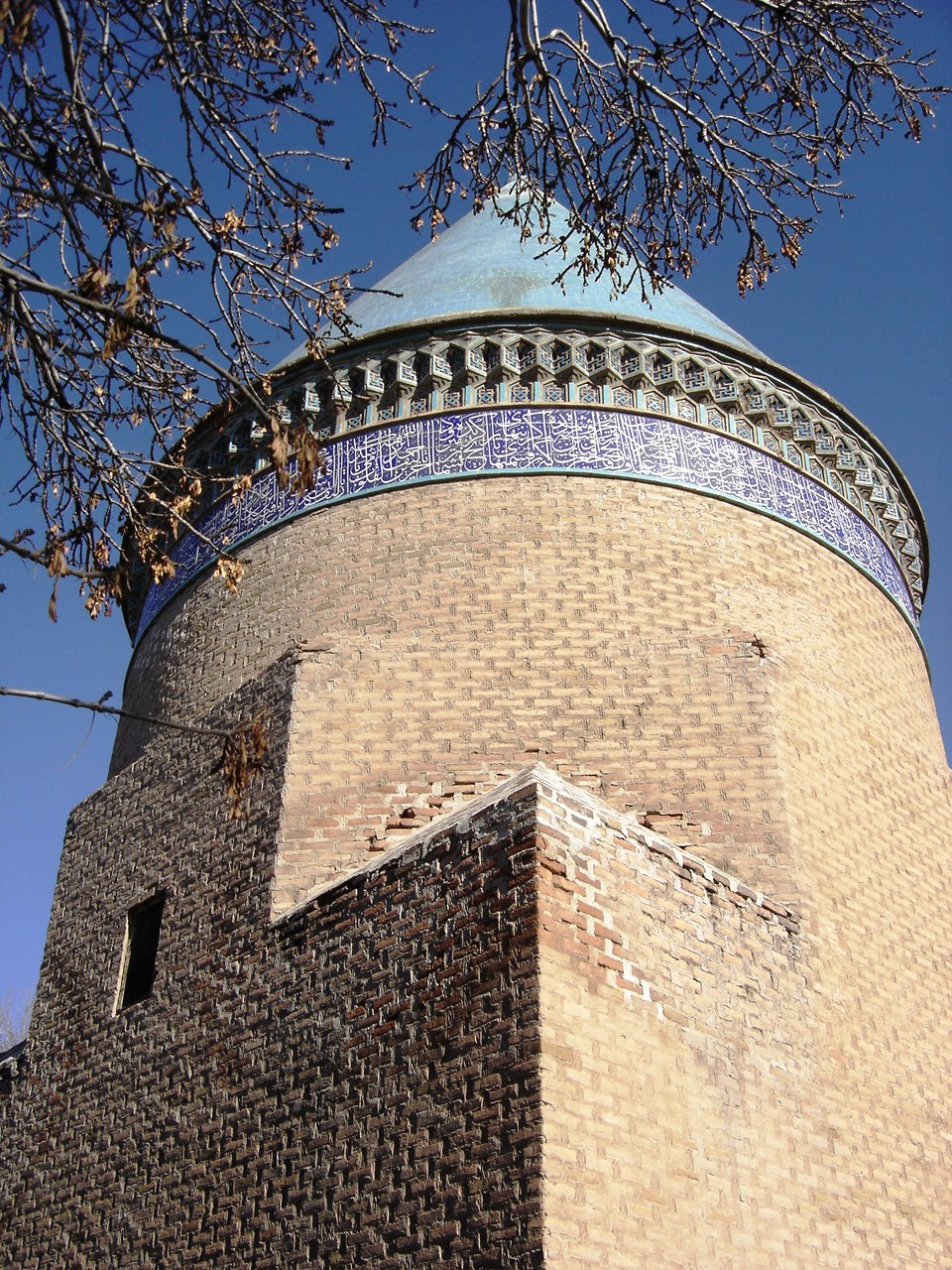
Hamdallah Mustawfi Tomb, Qazvin, Iran

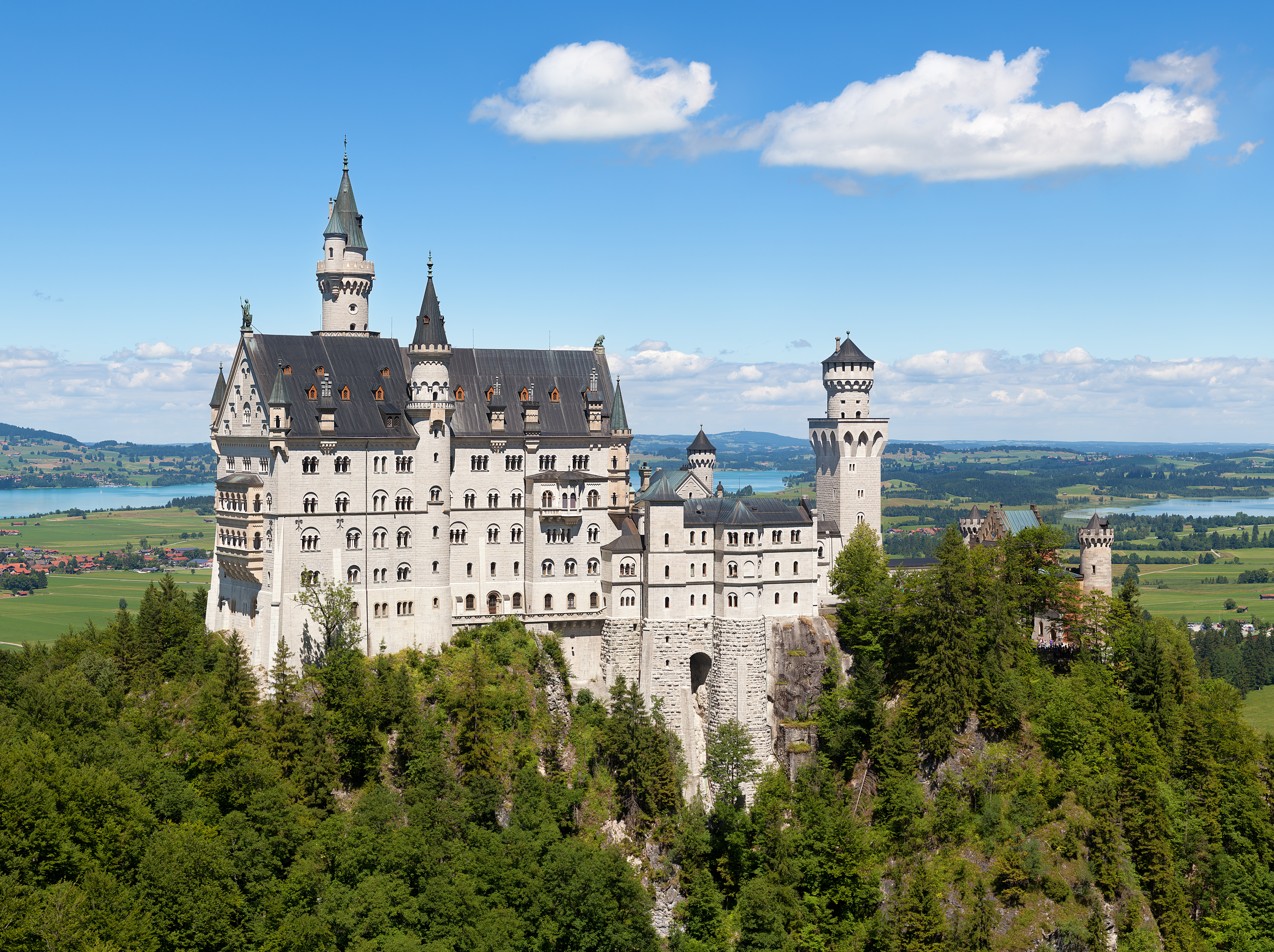
Neuschwanstein Castle, Bavaria, Germany

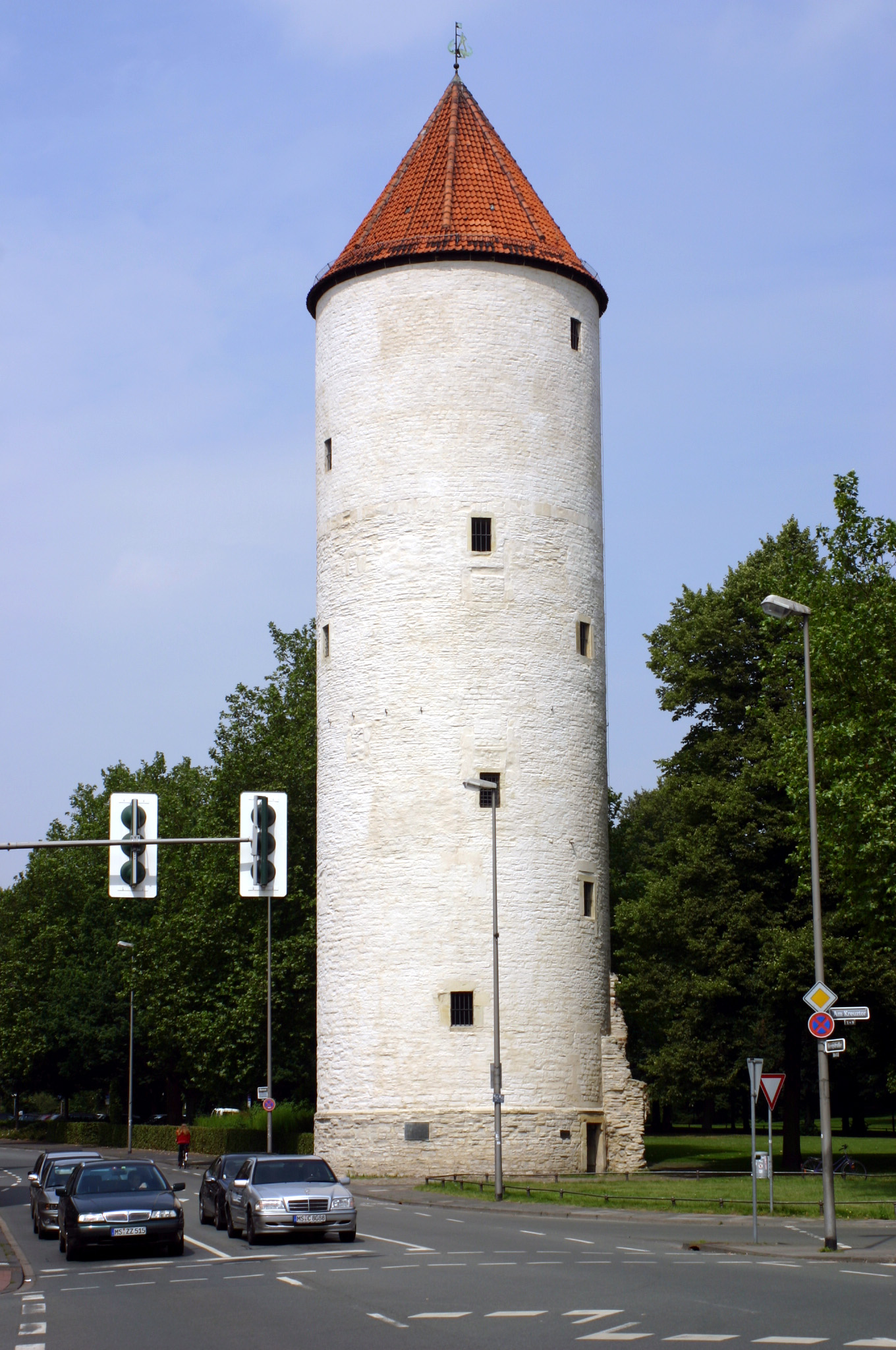
Buddenturm (de), a 12th-century defensive tower, in Münster, Germany

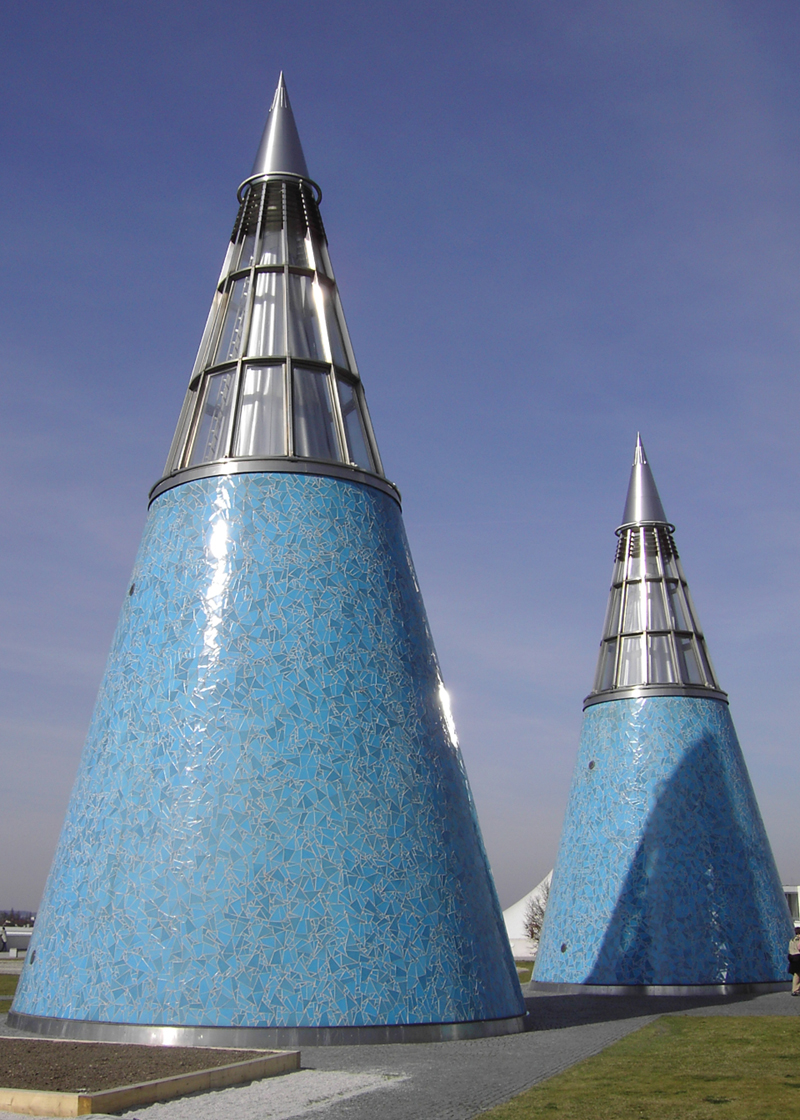
Modern conical roofs on the Bundeskunsthalle in Bonn, Germany

A conical roof or cone roof is a cone-shaped roof that is circular at its base and terminates in a point.

== Distribution ==
Conical roofs are frequently found on top of towers in medieval town fortifications and castles, where they may either sit directly on the outer wall of the tower (sometimes projecting beyond it to form eaves) or form a superstructure above the fighting platform or terrace of the tower. The latter necessitated the use of spouts to lead the water away over the top of the walls (e.g. as at Andernach's Alter Krahnen). In this case, the conical roof was surrounded by a defensive wall, a parapet, or a battlement. Such conical roofs were usually constructed using a timber-framed support structure covered with slate. More rarely, they were made of masonry.

A small circular turret or tourelle with a conical roof is called a pepperpot or pepperbox turret.

== Present ==
Today, conical roofs are more often used in rural areas, either for circular or small square buildings. They are difficult to construct but use locally available materials.

Conical roofs are widely used in Armenian and Georgian church architecture.

A key feature of the Solomon Islands Parliament Building is its conical roof.

== See also ==
- Dutch gable roof
- List of roof shapes
