= Wellington (given name) =

Wellington is a masculine given name borne by:

- Wellington Albert (born 1994), Papua New Guinean Rugby League player
- Wellington Carvalho dos Santos, Brazilian footballer
- Wellington Dias (footballer) (born 1977), Brazilian football midfielder
- Wellington Dias (politician) (born 1962), Brazilian politician from Piauí
- Wellington Leal Dias Santos (born 1967), Brazilian jiu-jitsu practitioner
- Wellington Fagundes (born 1957), Brazilian Senator for Mato Grosso
- Wellington Gonçalves (born 1983), Brazilian footballer
- Wellington Jighere, Nigerian Scrabble player
- Wellington Koo (1887–1985), Chinese diplomat
- Wellington Koo (politician, born 1958), Taiwanese lawyer and politician
- Wellington Lima (acrobat) (born 1979), Brazilian artistic acrobat and performer
- Wellington Mara (1916–2006), American NFL team owner
- Wellington Masakadza (born 1993), Zimbabwean cricketer
- Wellington Nem (born 1992), Brazilian footballer
- ʻUelingatoni Ngū (1854–1885), Tongan crown prince from 1879 to 1885
- Wellington A. Playter (1879–1937), English actor
- Wellington Reiter (born 1957), American architect and urban designer
- Wellington Sandoval, Peruvian Defense Minister
- Wellington Turman (born 1996), Brazilian professional mixed martial artist
- Wellington Webb (born 1941), American politician
- Wellington Willoughby (1859–1932), Canadian politician and lawyer

== Fictional characters ==
- Wellington, from the long-running British comic strip The Perishers (1959–2006)
