= Australia–Solomon Islands Bilateral Security Treaty =

2017 treaty between Australia and Solomon Islands

Australia-Solomon Islands Bilateral Security Treaty
Agreement between the Government of Australia and the Government of Solomon Islands Concerning the Basis for Deployment of Police, Armed Forces, and other Personnel to Solomon Islands
- Type: Military treaty
- Signed: 14 August 2017
- Location: Canberra, Australia
- Effective: 13 June 2018
- Condition: Ratification by Australia and Solomon Islands
- Signatories: Australia; Solomon Islands
- Languages: English

The Australia-Solomon Islands Bilateral Security Treaty (full title: Agreement between the Government of Australia and the Government of Solomon Islands Concerning the Basis for Deployment of Police, Armed Forces, and other Personnel to Solomon Islands) is a treaty between Australia and the Solomon Islands. The treaty was signed in 2017 and came into force in 2018. The treaty replaces the Regional Assistance Mission to Solomon Islands (RAMSI) treaty which expired in 2017 when Australian personnel were withdrawn.

The treaty allows for Australian police, defence and civilian personnel to deploy to the Solomon Islands to assist with a range of security threats, including natural disasters, where both governments agree.

The treaty was invoked in November 2021 when the Solomon Islands government requested assistance from Australia to support the Royal Solomon Islands Police Force in restoring order during the 2021 Solomon Islands unrest.
