= Diocesan School for Girls =

Diocesan School for Girls can refer to:

Ireland

- The Diocesan School for Girls, Dublin, merged with The High School, Dublin in 1974

New Zealand

- Diocesan School for Girls (Auckland)
- Waikato Diocesan School, Hamilton

South Africa

- Diocesan School for Girls, Grahamstown, Eastern Cape
- St. Mary's Diocesan School for Girls, Kloof, KwaZulu-Natal
- St. John's Diocesan School for Girls Pietermaritzburg, KwaZulu-Natal

See also

- Diocesan Girls' School
