= Wellington Township =

Wellington Township may refer to the following places:

- Wellington Township, Sumner County, Kansas
- Wellington Township, Maine, former name of Monticello, Maine
- Wellington Township, Alpena County, Michigan
- Wellington Township, Renville County, Minnesota
- Wellington Township, Bottineau County, North Dakota
- Wellington Township, Lorain County, Ohio
- Wellington Township, Minnehaha County, South Dakota

See also

- Wellington (disambiguation)
