= Hutt International Boys' School =

Secondary school in Upper Hutt, New Zealand

Location
- Granville Street, Trentham, Upper Hutt, New Zealand; 41.1406°S 175.0372°E

Information
- Funding type: State-integrated (independent before 1994) secondary
- Motto: "Encourage and Expect Excellence"
- Established: 1991; 35 years ago
- Ministry of Education Institution no.: 4158
- Principal: Tom Gordon
- Years offered: 7–13
- Gender: Single sex boys
- Enrolment: 653 (July 2026)
- Socio-economic decile: 10Z
- Website: hibs.school.nz

Hutt International Boys' School (usually known by its acronym, HIBS) is a state integrated boys' secondary school in Trentham, Upper Hutt, New Zealand, founded in 1991. The school is multi-denominational and affiliated with the Anglican faith.

The current principal is Tom Gordon, who took up the position in January 2022.

== History ==
HIBS was founded in 1991 as a private school, and was then known as Hutt Independent Boys' School, with Barry Kerr as principal. The school was briefly sited in Silverstream, Upper Hutt, on land that later became a rest home. However, due to the lease on the site expiring, the school moved to its present site in Trentham, Upper Hutt in 1994, on land previously owned by the Wellington Racing Club, which included the former Burma Lodge motel. The school also became state integrated the same year.

The school has had many building projects on its current site, with major projects including the school gymnasium in 1996, the schools administration and ICT / Library block with first-floor classrooms in 2004, and the school auditorium and chapel, planned in 2004 and completed in 2008. In 2016 the school undertook a new construction project which included the new Maths and Social Sciences classroom block and was followed by the new Visual Art rooms later in 2017. The same year the English/ICT Block and the school Library were renovated.

Principal Grahame Duffy started in 2002, serving 11 years and departed at the end of the 2013 school year. He was succeeded by principal Mike Hutchins for the 2014 school year.

At the end of 2021, principal Mike Hutchins announced his retirement after serving 8 years as principal and was succeeded by Tom Gordon in January 2022.

=== Controversies ===
==== School donations ====
The school came under fire in 2010 when the then Minister of Education Anne Tolley called an investigation into the "forced" school donation after correspondence showed it was not clear which part of the fees was compulsory and which was a donation. In 2015, HIBS was ranked number 2 in the list of schools receiving the most in school donations in New Zealand, totaling $2,057,620. This contrasted approximately 55 schools in New Zealand which received less than $500 in donations overall. The school has stated that the reasoning for this is that is "the key to small class sizes and hiring extra staff needed for this, beyond the level allowed by Government".

== School life ==
=== House system ===
The school has operated a house system since 1996, similar to that used in English public schools and many New Zealand high schools. Each house is named after an iconic New Zealander: Freyberg (named after Bernard Freyberg), Halberg (named after Murray Halberg), Rutherford (named after Ernest Rutherford), and Hillary (named after Edmund Hillary). These houses compete against each other in fierce competition for the interhouse cup in a number of events throughout the year.

=== International service ===
The school runs an ′International Service′ programme, where each year a group of students complete service by helping others in less fortunate countries. This programme is why the school gets the 'International' part in its name, although it is not strictly an international school in the traditional sense. The group of students perform tasks such as painting school buildings, installing computer systems, building facilities such as storm shelters and classrooms, improving drainage as well as learning about the culture of another country and interacting with its people. HIBS has performed International Service of countries such as Philippines, Vanuatu, Mexico, Samoa, Vietnam, Tonga, Cook Islands and Fiji.

=== Aviation ===
The school has an aviation programme, which it has run since 2000. The program allows for students to gain their private pilot licence before they leave school. As of 2017, the programme has had 24 graduates.

== Enrolment ==
At the September 2015 Education Review Office (ERO) review of the school, HIBS had 653 students. Most of the students identified themselves as New Zealand European (Pākehā). The ethnic composition was 76% New Zealand European (Pākehā), 7% Māori, and 17% as other ethnic groups.

The school has a socioeconomic decile rating of 10Z, meaning it draws its school community from an area of high socio-economic advantage when compared to other New Zealand schools.

== Notable alumni ==
- Chris Bishop – Member of Parliament
- Jehan Casinader – journalist and television presenter
- Julian Dennison – actor
- Brannavan Gnanalingam – author
- Dan Keat – footballer
- Drew Neemia – television personality, singer
- Rachin Ravindra – cricketer
- Michael Wilson – footballer
- Ben Waine – footballer
- Ben Sears – cricketer
- Ryan Wood – Motor racing
