= School fees in New Zealand =

School fees in New Zealand is a term referring to monetary payments by parents or guardians to their child's school.

In state and state-integrated schools, "school fees" is most commonly used to describe a request from schools to parents or guardians for a donation (usually annual) to their child's school. Although this payment is entirely voluntary, some school boards use terms such as "Fees", "School Levy" or "Parental Contribution" to coerce payment from parents. The Ministry of Education direction from its 1998-25 Fees Circular to school Boards advises that terms to imply that payment of the sum is compulsory should not be used, particularly "fee" or "levy". Instead, the term "School Donation" is suggested.

State and state-integrated schools can charge Activity Fees for items above and beyond the curriculum, but payment of the donation is voluntary.

In state-integrated schools, there is a compulsory fee called "Attendance Dues". Schools have to report their attendance dues to the Ministry of Education, where any changes to the dues are monitored. Attendance dues are payable for upkeep of the school land and buildings, which unlike in state schools are privately owned by proprietors, such as the Catholic Church in the case of a Catholic school. While school donations are voluntary like in state schools, parents/guardians are contractually and legally required to pay attendance dues, and proprietors can take action against parents or even cancel the enrolment of the child over unpaid attendance dues.

== Right to free primary and secondary education ==
Section 3 of the Education Act 1989 states the following:

"Except as provided in this Act, every person who is not an international student is entitled to free enrolment and free education at any State school or partnership school kura hourua during the period beginning on the person’s fifth birthday and ending on 1 January after the person’s 19th birthday."

The act defines an international student as anyone who is not a New Zealand citizen or the holder of a New Zealand residence class visa. By virtue of the Trans-Tasman Travel Arrangement, Australian citizens and residents are automatically awarded a residence class visa on entry into New Zealand, so are not classified as international students. There are additional circumstances in which students are not classified as international students, such as children of refugees and foreign diplomats in New Zealand.

This means as long as the student is a domestic student, parents and/or legal guardians do not have to pay for things such as;

- the cost of tuition or materials used in the provision of the curriculum,
- the cost of heat, lighting or water,
- the cost of providing information about enrolling at the school,
- interviews when parents are seeking to enrol students at a school.

=== BYO Devices ===
On 26 March 2017, the NZ Herald reported that the Ministry of Education was set to remind schools that they can't enforce bring your own devices on parents. Ministry of Education deputy secretary Katrina Casey was quoted as saying:

″Compulsory BYOD policies breached provisions in the Education Act guaranteeing a "free education" at state and partnership schools for all children from age 5 to 19.″

″We will be reminding all schools that boards of trustees can ask, but can't compel, families to bring their own digital devices because schools can't deny a child's access to learning if their parents can't provide them one. In these cases, boards need to provide access to a school device. No child's learning should ever be disadvantaged by a lack of access to technology.″

== Delivery of the curriculum ==
The Government provides funding for teacher salaries, operational grants and supplementary grants to pay for the running of state and state-integrated schools and the delivery of the curriculum, so schools may only charge parents for things that fall outside of the curriculum.

== Activity fees ==
Schools can ask for, but not insist on, payment of fees for activities that fall outside the curriculum or have a "take home component", at the beginning of the year. Schools can not make payment in advance a condition of enrolment and must ensure that learning is not impacted through non-payment for any reason, as Section 3 of the Education Act guarantees free enrolment.

The Ministry suggests that;

- schools provide a "pay as you go" option so that parents do not pay in advance for things such as class trips that a sick child may not ultimately attend.
- schools itemize their fees so that parents can choose which activities they want their children to participate in.
- schools inform parents at the beginning of the year of the materials charge for subjects such as clothing and woodwork.

Notably the Ministry of Education (1998-25) advises that it is inappropriate for activity fees to cover student workbooks (textbooks that students write in) and photocopying. Activity fees are a 'goods and service' so attract GST. The operation of activity fees is described in cases below.

=== School camps ===
If an Outdoor Education Camp is part of the curriculum of a particular course at school, then the school may not charge for it. However they can charge for food and transport to the camp.

If parents are unable or unwilling to pay for a school camp that is not part of the curriculum, or for food and transport to one that is, then the school should provide activities that will be an "appropriate alternative" for the children who do not go to the camp.

=== School projects ===
Schools may charge for materials in classes such as woodwork and design when the student is able to take the finished project home. But the school should not force students to take the project home just so they can be charged for it. If a high cost project is being planned a lower cost alternative should also be provided.

=== Photocopying ===
Schools cannot charge for photocopying except in exceptional cases. In most cases the teacher handing out photocopied materials is an integral part of the delivery of the Curriculum. Schools cannot charge for textbooks or workbooks unless the student is allowed to keep the book.

=== Programmes in English for speakers of other languages ===
If the school is being funded by the Ministry or some other institution to provide these programmes then it cannot charge students to attend. A school may charge for unfunded programmes but it cannot compel parents to enrol their students in them.

=== Special Education Programmes ===
Special Education Programmes are usually funded through the Ongoing Resourcing Scheme, Specialist Education Services, or the Special Education Grant so schools can not charge for these programmes.

=== STAR Courses ===
Schools are funded by the Ministry to provide these courses. Unless there is a "take home component" of the course, students cannot be charged for STAR courses.

=== Reading Recovery Programme ===
The Reading Recovery Programme is part of the curriculum and there can be no charge for it.

=== NCEA fees ===
These fees were collected by Secondary schools on behalf of the New Zealand Qualifications Authority (NZQA) for the cost of administering the National Certificate of Educational Achievement (NCEA), the main secondary school qualification in New Zealand. The fee was $76.70 per year, although it could be reduced to $20 for those with a Community Services Card (this includes all beneficiaries) or have three or more children completing NCEA.

The fee was abolished by the Sixth Labour Government in 2019.

== Enrolment fees ==
On 27 February 2016 the New Zealand Herald reported that Auckland Grammar School and Cornwall Park District School requested a payment from parents to participate in the ballot for out-of-zone places.

This resulted in the Ministry of Education issuing an Auckland-wide "critical reminder" to remind principals that they are not allowed to charge for participation in the ballots.

The reminder stated "Administering a ballot for out-of-zone students is considered part of the normal activity of school staff"

Katrina Casey, of the Ministry of Education, also stated that: "We have written to Auckland Grammar School and Cornwall Park District School to explain no payment connected with enrolment could be sought from parents and that schools cannot charge a ballot application fee, or make a fee a condition of enrolment,".

== School donations ==
Many schools request a school donation. It is voluntary, tax-deductible for parents, and does not attract GST. Schools state that the school donation is needed to bridge the gap between the costs of delivering quality learning over and above what the Government funds.

Schools typically use the funding to top-up the Operational Grant. Funds are tagged for items attractive to parents – e.g. additional teachers/small class sizes, ICT, or other learning resources, but as they are counted as income for operational matters in reality donations are indistinguishable from other operational grant expenditure, including any staff funded by the board of trustees.

The Government provides a higher Operations Grant for low decile schools because the decile represents the school community's socio-economic rank. As they get less Government funding, and because parents have more ability to pay, high decile schools typically request a larger donation.

On 10 May 2013, the NZ Herald reported that in 2012 parents raised "more than $357 million a year in donations and fundraising to support the "free" schooling system."

== Non-Payment of donations ==
Wellington College, a decile 10 school, charges $720 per student and $250 for each sibling each year for "extras" such as sports gear and computers, and the headmaster Roger Moses has admitted that it is powerless to act against the quarter of parents who refused to pay. Auckland Grammar deputy headmaster Wayne Moore said only 65 per cent of parents paid and his school would introduce a $250 "compulsory fee" in 2008 for technology subjects. The Rector of Palmerston North Boys' High School (decile 9), Tim O'Connor said that:

"We have parents who simply don't pay, believing that we have a totally free education system, which is generally supported by what the ministry tells parents."

and that his school was considering hiring a full-time commercial manager to raise the extra $1.5 million a year it needed to operate.

In 2007 Feilding High School allegedly named students in school assembly, sent students home and restricted access to classes, because their parents had not paid subject fees. The Ministry of Education said in a media release that:

... a school has the right to pursue the payment of legitimate charges. It has access to the same debt recovery processes as any other organisation. Parents are required to pay any legitimate charges that have been agreed with the school in the same manner that they are required to pay their power and phone bills.

However, Mr Matheson also said that a school cannot use students as a lever in debt recovery. A school has no right to restrict access to classes, or send students home, or to shame students as a device to force their parents to pay. The issue of the claimed debt is between the school and parents.

Because school attendance is compulsory for students it is unethical for a school to use its relationship with students in this manner.

Failure to ensure the well-being of all students at the school could result in the ministry using its statutory powers to intervene in the operation of the school board. The ministry has the power to appoint a specialist adviser to the board, or a limited statutory manager to manage student well-being, or a commissioner to run the school.

School Trustees Association head Ray Newport says fewer parents have been paying the donation in recent years. At some schools the percentage is as low as 20% and even at the highest-decile schools, many parents opt out.

=== Withholding school reports ===
School Boards cannot withhold school reports or leaving certificates until the Activity Fees, School Donation or any other charges have been paid as the National Education Guidelines state that:

Each Board, through the principal and staff, will be required to...report on student progress

Schools must also obey Section 5 of the Official Information Act 1982

The question whether any official information is to be made available, where that question arises under this Act, shall be determined, except where this Act otherwise expressly requires, in accordance with the purposes of this Act and the principle that the information shall be made available unless there is good reason for withholding it.

And Section 6, Principle 6(1) of the Privacy Act 1993

Where an agency holds personal information in such a way that it can readily be retrieved, the individual concerned shall be entitled...to have access to that information.

=== Surcharges and Withholding Privileges ===
On 29 May 2013, the NZ Herald reported that Avondale College would not allow a student who had not made a donation to attend the school ball.

on 2 June 2013, the NZ Herald also reported that Macleans College added surcharges to ball and graduation dinner tickets, sports, drama and dance activities, and fees for Cambridge International exams if a student had not made a donation. The NZ Herald also stated that Macleans College was being investigated and according to the Ministry of Education the practice was unlawful.

Ministry of Education spokeswoman Katrina Casey said that:

she would seek assurances from Macleans College that: - Any unlawful charging of fees will cease. - Students will not have privileges withheld because of non-payment of donations. - There will be no coercion to pay donations

Principal Byron Bentley was quoted as saying: "We beg to differ that these charges are unlawful – we had our lawyers look at this years ago".

On 30 January 2013, Seek.co.nz reported that:

In 2010, Karamu High School in Hastings was reprimanded after advising a parent that her daughter could not buy a ball ticket or order a school-leaver's jersey until donation money was paid. The threat was withdrawn after the ministry became involved.

== Tax status of the school donation ==
As School Donations are voluntary contributions, schools do not have to pay GST on the money they collect. New Zealand tax residents can claim 33.33 percent of the donation back through the Inland Revenue Department, by filing a Tax credit claim form (IR 526) with the donation receipt attached after the end of the tax year (i.e. 31 March) in which the donation was made.

Schools that withhold items or activities that are fully funded by the school donation, such as the school magazine, are threatening the tax status of their School Donations. The Ministry states that this action...

...implies that the school donation is not a voluntary donation at all but, at least in part, is a payment for goods and services. This may mean that all school parents would be unable to claim an income tax rebate on their "donation" and the board would have to pay GST on all the money it collected by way of school "donations". Furthermore, withholding an item can have other consequences eg if the student ID card is used as a swipe card to enable students to borrow library books, to withhold the card from students whose parents have not paid the school donation would have the effect of denying the student a privilege that is available to other students. (It is also worth remembering that the library building has been provided by Government and most of the books will have been purchased with operational funding.)

== Debt collection by schools ==
On 20 January 2008, The Sunday Star-Times printed an article entitled Cash-strapped schools call in heavies to collect donations by Catherine Woulfe.

The article claims that debt collector Baycorp says that it has contacted "a handful" of parents on behalf of state schools to pay school donations. It further claims that community law advisory group YouthLaw has received calls from parents who have been chased by debt collectors because they have chosen not to pay school donations.

Secondary Principals' Association head Arthur Graves, principal of Greymouth High School says he would never use a debt collector to chase school fees, but knows of others doing so.

Minister of Education, Chris Carter said coercing parents to pay donations was illegal and

"I would not tolerate any New Zealand school breaking the law. I would certainly intervene if parents approached me and I would urge them to do so... Parents are to email or telephone my office if a school has done that".

The article also claims that YouthLaw has heard from students whose families have not paid the donation who have been banned from school balls or trips, or not given the leaving certificates needed for entry into university or other tertiary institutions.

== Size of school donation ==
On 14 February 2009, The New Zealand Herald ran an article entitled "Parents asked to dig even deeper" which was based on the results of a survey of Secondary schools in its distribution area. The results for a selection of Auckland secondary schools are as follows:

| School | Decile | Donation in 2009 | % of parents who pay |
|---|---|---|---|
| Auckland Grammar School, Mt Eden | 10 | $860 per student, $1720 max per family | 80% |
| Westlake Boys High School, Takapuna | 9 | $475 per student, $650 per family | 75% |
| Pakuranga College, Pakuranga | 8 | $300 one student, $575 two students, $700 three students | 63% |
| Mt Albert Grammar School, Mt Albert | 7 | $230 per student, $80 for the second student | 60% |
| Rutherford College, Te Atatū | 6 | $150 per student, $60 for the second student, $15 for the third | 40% |
| Auckland Girls' Grammar School, Freemans Bay | 5 | $220 per student, $200 more than one | 55% |
| Avondale College, Avondale | 4 | $175 per student, $240 per family | 65% |
| Alfriston College, Manurewa | 3 | $100 per student | 55% |
| Manurewa High School, Manurewa | 2 | $100 per student | 45% |
| Mangere College, Mangere | 1 | $40 per student, $80 per family | 25% |

In addition to the above, the results of a 2012 web search for "school donation" shows that primary school donations are lower, and the link to the decile socio-economic rating means the donation requested is higher in high decile schools:

| School | Decile | Donation in 2012 |
|---|---|---|
| Fairfield Primary (Hamilton) | 1 | $20 per student, $50 per family |
| Kaeo Primary | 2 | $20 per student |
| Mt Albert Primary | 4 | $100 ($165 overall for more than 1 child) |
| Massey Primary | 4 | $90 ($200 for 3 or more children) |
| Mt Roskill Primary | 5 | $140 ($80–100 for additional child) |
| Reporoa Primary | 6 | $80 |
| Orewa North Primary | 7 | $160 |
| Upper Hutt Primary | 7 | $100 |
| Orewa Primary | 8 | $120 |
| Hauraki Primary | 10 | $250 |
| Owairoa Primary | 10 | $240 |
| KingsWay School (Year 1–13) | 10 | $552 per student, all ages |
| Taupo-nui-a-Tia College | 4 | $120 |
| Timaru Girls High | 6 | $80–100 (2011) |
| Tauhara College | 6 | $100 |
| Rangiora High | 8 | $95 (2011) |
| Geraldine High | 8 | $100 (2011) |
| St Hilda's Collegiate | 10 | $315 |
| Wellington College | 10 | $720 (plus $250 for each sibling) |
| Epsom Girls Grammar | 10 | $595 ($1490 for 3 or more) |
| Rangitoto College | 10 | $250 ($200 per sibling) |
| Westlake Boys High | 10 | $500 (2013) |
| Westlake Girls High | 10 | $375 ($200 per sibling) |

School deciles listed from www.tki.org.nz and www.parliament.govt.nz.
