= St. John's Diocesan School for Girls =

St. John's D.S.G.

Location
- Pietermaritzburg, KwaZulu-Natal; South Africa
- 29°36′49″S 30°24′18″E

Information
- Type: Private, Boarding
- Motto: Laborare est Orare
- Established: 1897
- Locale: Urban
- Principal: Simon Moore
- Exam board: IEB
- Grades: RR - 12
- Enrollment: 500 girls
- Colours: Yellow & Black
- Mascot: Eagle
- Fees: R 156 900 p.a. (Matric boarding); R 108370 p.a. (Matric day scholar)
- Website: www.stjohnsdsg.com

St. John's Diocesan School for Girls is a private boarding and day school for girls in Scottsville, Pietermaritzburg, KwaZulu-Natal, South Africa.

== History ==
It was founded in 1897 by the Society of Sisters of St John the Divine and has an Anglican foundation.

In 1887, Sister Fanny, together with Novices Anna and Margaret (who took their vows soon after they arrived), were sent out to Pietermaritzburg from England to look after and educate orphans. Within months they were running the St Cross Orphanage in Loop Street and had named their little community 'The Society of St John the Divine'.

As the orphanage expanded, the Sisters decided to build a boarding facility to accommodate children who wished to attend school in the town. Thus in 1894 the foundation stone to the convent in Burger Street was laid where the present Medical Centre now exists. Numbers continued to grow and the building next to the convent was acquired for older girls and was named 'St John's School' in 1897. The following year this building became a school for girls from kindergarten to Matric.

In 1913, a site was selected in Scottsville to give "...a freer life . . .more space for playing fields, more accommodation for boarders and better school buildings" and so began the development of the school to what it is today. The original school building, opened in 1915, is now part of the Junior School, the Junior Resource centre being the original school hall.
