= Wennington =

Wennington can refer to:

- Wennington, Cambridgeshire, England
- Wennington, Lancashire, England
- Wennington, London, England
- Wennington School, England
- Bill Wennington (born 1963), Canadian former NBA basketball player
