= Wellington High School =

Wellington High School may refer to the following high schools:

== United States ==
- Wellington High School (Wellington, Florida)
- Wellington High School (Kansas), Wellington, Kansas
- Wellington High School (Wellington, Ohio)
- Wellington High School (Texas)

== Elsewhere ==
- Wellington Secondary College, a state high school in Mulgrave, Melbourne, Victoria, Australia
- Wellington Secondary School, a high school in Nanaimo, British Columbia, Canada
- Wellington High School, New Zealand
- Wellington High School for Girls, a former school in Wellington, Shropshire, United Kingdom

== See also ==
- Wellington C. Mepham High School
- Wellington School (disambiguation)
