= Wellington station (disambiguation) =

Wellington railway station is a railway station in New Zealand.

Wellington station may also refer to:

- Wellington railway station (Shropshire) in Telford, Shropshire, England
- Wellington railway station (Somerset) in Wellington, Somerset, England (closed)
- Wellington railway station (South Africa) in Wellington, Western Cape, South Africa
- Wellington railway station (Tamil Nadu) in India
- Wellington station (CTA) on the Brown Line in Chicago, Illinois, United States
- Wellington (MBTA station) in Medford, Massachusetts, United States
- Wellington station (British Columbia) in Nanaimo, British Columbia, Canada
- Wellington railway station, New South Wales in New South Wales, Australia
