= Stephen Wellington =

Australian cricketer

Personal information
- Full name: Stephen Leslie Wellington
- Born: 4 July 1899; Beaconsfield, Tasmania, Australia
- Died: 11 June 1974 (aged 74); Scotts Head, New South Wales, Australia

Domestic team information
- Years: Team
- 1928/29: Tasmania
- Source: Cricinfo, 4 March 2016

Stephen Wellington (4 July 1899 – 11 June 1974) was an Australian cricketer. He played one first-class match for Tasmania in 1928/29.

== See also ==
- List of Tasmanian representative cricketers
