= Solomon Islands Parliament Building =

National Parliament Building of the Solomon Islands

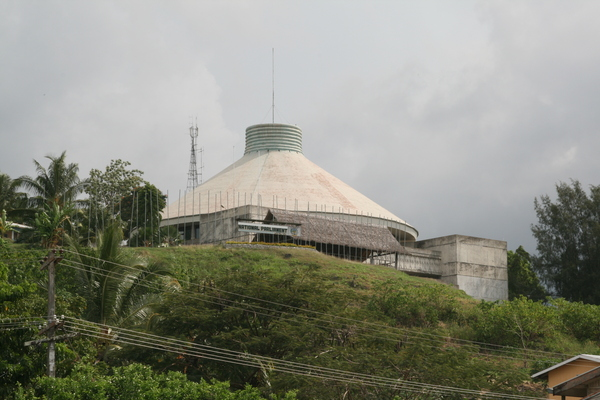
- Interactive map of the Solomon Islands Parliament Building area

General information
- Location: Honiara, Solomon Islands
- Coordinates: 9°26′1″S 159°57′21″E
- Inaugurated: November 1993; 32 years ago
- Cost: US$ 5 million
- Client: Government of Solomon Islands

Height
- Height: 13 m (43 ft)

Technical details
- Floor count: 2
- Floor area: 2,000 square metres (22,000 sq ft)

Design and construction
- Architect: Michael J. Batchelor
- Architecture firm: Wimberly Allison Tong & Goo
- Civil engineer: Martin & Bravo Inc
- Main contractor: Kitamo Construction Group

The Solomon Islands Parliament Building in Honiara is the seat of the National Parliament of Solomon Islands.

== History ==
From 1978 to 1994, Parliament met at Kalala House, which now houses the High Court. The parliamentary building was built as a US$ 5 million gift from the United States government, in memory of the US servicemen who died in the Battle of Guadalcanal. The two-storey conical concrete building was built by Japanese construction company, Kitano, in 1993, under the supervision of the US Naval Services.

The first meeting was held in November 1993. The building includes a unicameral chamber, 600 seat public gallery, library, offices for the speaker and clerk, as well as committee rooms but no offices for parliamentary members and staff.

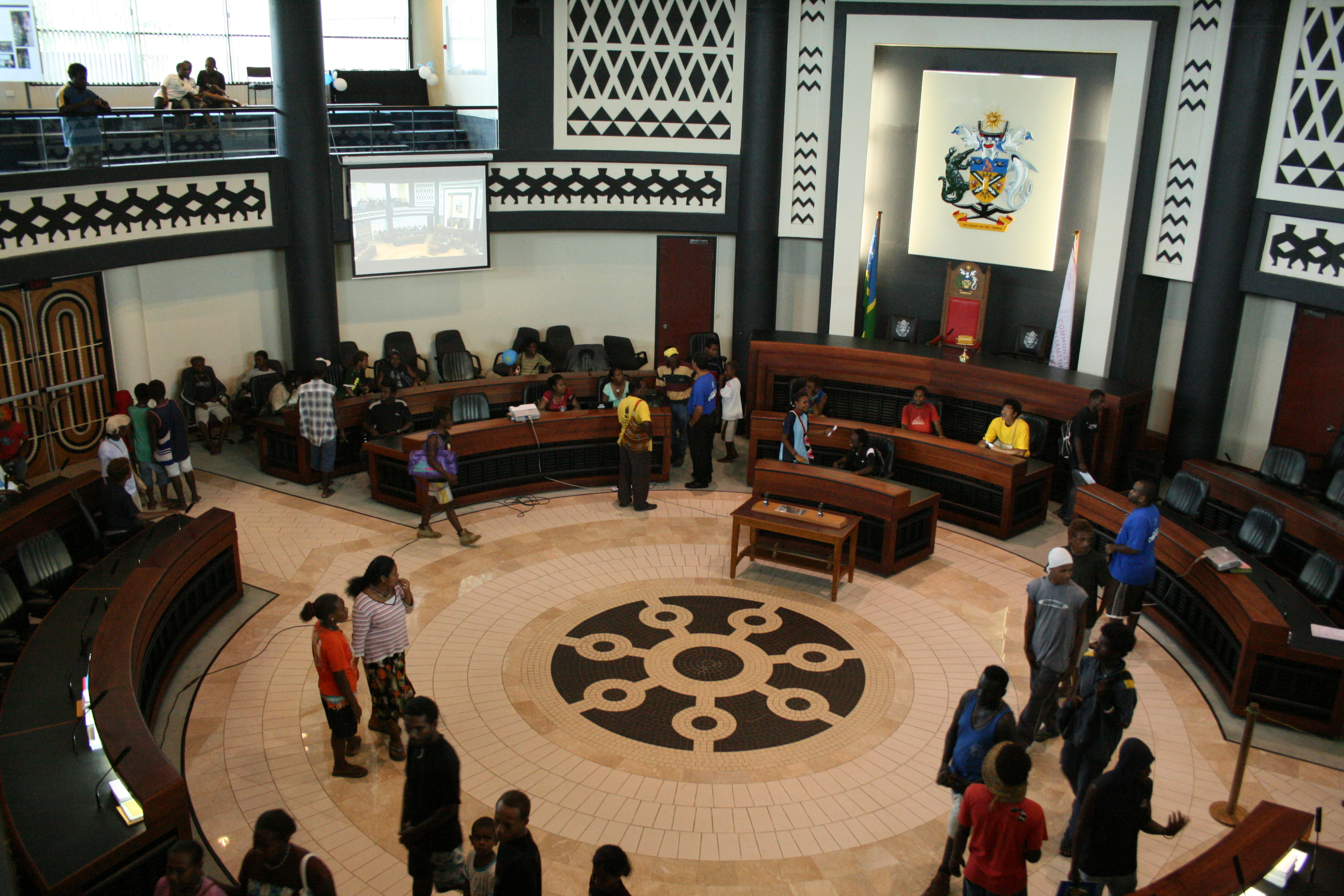
Solomon Islands parliamentary chamber (2008)

During the 2021 Solomon Islands unrest a building adjoining the parliamentary building was burnt down and the parliamentary building occupied by protestors.

== Architecture ==
The project was administered by the Department of the Navy, Pacific Division Naval Facilities Engineering Command, who selected the Honolulu-based architectural firm, Wimberly Allison Tong & Goo, to design the building. The project architect, Michael J. Batchelor, described the Solomon Island government requested "that it be representative of their emerging democracy" and that it should be "essentially Solomon Islands in style, not an imposed architecture." It is a two-storey, 2,000 square metres (22,000 sq ft) building with a steel frame, reinforced concrete and extensive glazing. The building's shell roof is an abstract version of two local roof styles, those of Temotu and Guadalcanal provinces. The roof's defining conical shape is derived from native Temotu roofs and has an unusual ridge, characteristic of indigenous Guadalcanal roofs. The detail at the top is unique to the Solomon Islands. It has seven major elements symbolising the seven provinces of the Solomon Islands.

The roof in its completed form has an overall diameter of 37.1 m (122 ft), with a height of 13 metres (43 ft) at its apex. The functional requirements of the unicameral chamber results in the conical-shaped roof being column free for the interior 18 metres (59 ft) diameter of the roof. The roof also has a perimeter cantilever extending 2.8 metres (9.2 ft) beyond the exterior walls.
