= Tauranga Girls' College =

Location
- 930 Cameron Road; Gate Pa; Tauranga 3112; New Zealand; 37.7131°S 176.1448°E

Information
- Type: State, Girls, Secondary (Year 9–13)
- Motto: Pergo et Perago (Strive to Achieve)
- Established: 1958
- Ministry of Education Institution no.: 122
- Principal: Tara Kanji
- Enrolment: 1,456 (July 2026)
- Socio-economic decile: 6N
- Website: tgc.school.nz

Tauranga Girls' College is a state single-sex girls secondary school in Tauranga, New Zealand. It offers the NCEA system of qualifications. The school has a roll of 1,456 students from years 9 to 13 (approx. ages 12 to 18) as of July 2026. The current principal is Tara Kanji.

Tauranga Girls' has many extracurricular activities, the largest of which is the drama production, which is produced with Tauranga Boys' College.

It was created due to the population increase and small area of Tauranga College, which became the site for Tauranga Boys College.

== Houses ==
Tauranga Girls' College has 5 houses.

- Batten (blue), named after pilot Jean Batten
- Sheppard (purple), named after activist Kate Sheppard
- Mansfield (yellow), named after author Katherine Mansfield
- Te Auetu (red), named after activist Te Auetu Harata Hall
- Whina (green), named after activist Whina Cooper
