= Wilfrid Wellington =

Wilfrid Lloyd Wellington was an Anglican priest in South Africa], most notably the last dean of St Saviour's Cathedral, Pietermaritzburg.

Wellington was the son of the Rev. Wilfrid Orford Wellington, the Vicar of Roodepoort in the Transvaal, and his wife, Florence Maud Lloyd. He was born on 10 December 1914.

== Career ==
He was educated at Rhodes University (BA, 1936) and St Paul's College, Grahamstown (Licentiate in Theology of the Faculty of Divinity of the province of South Africa, 1938), both in Grahamstown.

He was ordained deacon in the Church of the province of South Africa in 1938, and priest in 1939. After a curacy at St Mary's Cathedral, Johannesburg, 1938–1942, he served as Rector of Nigel, 1942–1943, and then as chaplain to the forces in the Union Defence Force from 1942 to 1946.

After being demobilised he served as Curate of the parish of Germiston under the Rev. Gonville ffrench-Beytagh, from 1946 to 1947. He was appointed Rector of Roodepoort in 1947; Vicar of Newcastle in 1949; of St Cyprian, Durban in 1952; and of Estcourt in 1960.

He was additionally archdeacon of Ladysmith from 1960 until his appointment as dean of Pietermaritzburg and Rector of the Cathedral Parish of St Saviour's, Pietermaritzburg, in 1968.

Dean Wellington retired in 1976.

== Personal life ==
Wilfrid Lloyd Wellington was married to Pamela Leslie Kenny on 31 December 1941.

He died in Pietermaritzburg on 11 June 1987. Mrs Wellington died on 1 August 2000.
