= Wellington School =

Wellington School may refer to:

== United Kingdom ==
- Wellington School, Bebington, Merseyside, England
- Wellington School, Timperley, Greater Manchester, England
- Wellington School, Shropshire, the former name of Wrekin College
- Wellington School, Somerset, England
- Wellington School, Ayr, Scotland
- Wellington School, Midlothian, Scotland

== United States ==
- The Wellington School in Columbus, Ohio, United States

== Elsewhere ==
- GEMS Wellington International School, Dubai, the United Arab Emirates
- Wellington School, an alternative name for the Wellington Group of New Zealand poets

== See also ==
- Wellington High School (disambiguation)
- Wellington College (disambiguation)
