= Welly =

Welly may refer to:

- Wellington boot, protective boot popularized by the first Duke of Wellington
- A nickname for the city of Wellington, New Zealand, and:
  - Wellington Phoenix FC, professional football club based in Wellington, New Zealand, and participating in the Australian A-League
- Welly, British Pop Band
