= HMNZS Wellington =

Two ships of the Royal New Zealand Navy have been named HMNZS Wellington after the national capital Wellington, the former Wellington Province, and/or the current Wellington Region:

- HMNZS Wellington (F69), a Leander-class frigate that commissioned in 1987 and was sunk as a dive wreck in 2005.
- HMNZS Wellington (P55), a Protector-class offshore patrol vessel currently in service.
