= Wellington Lima (acrobat) =

Brazilian artistic acrobat and performer (born 1979)

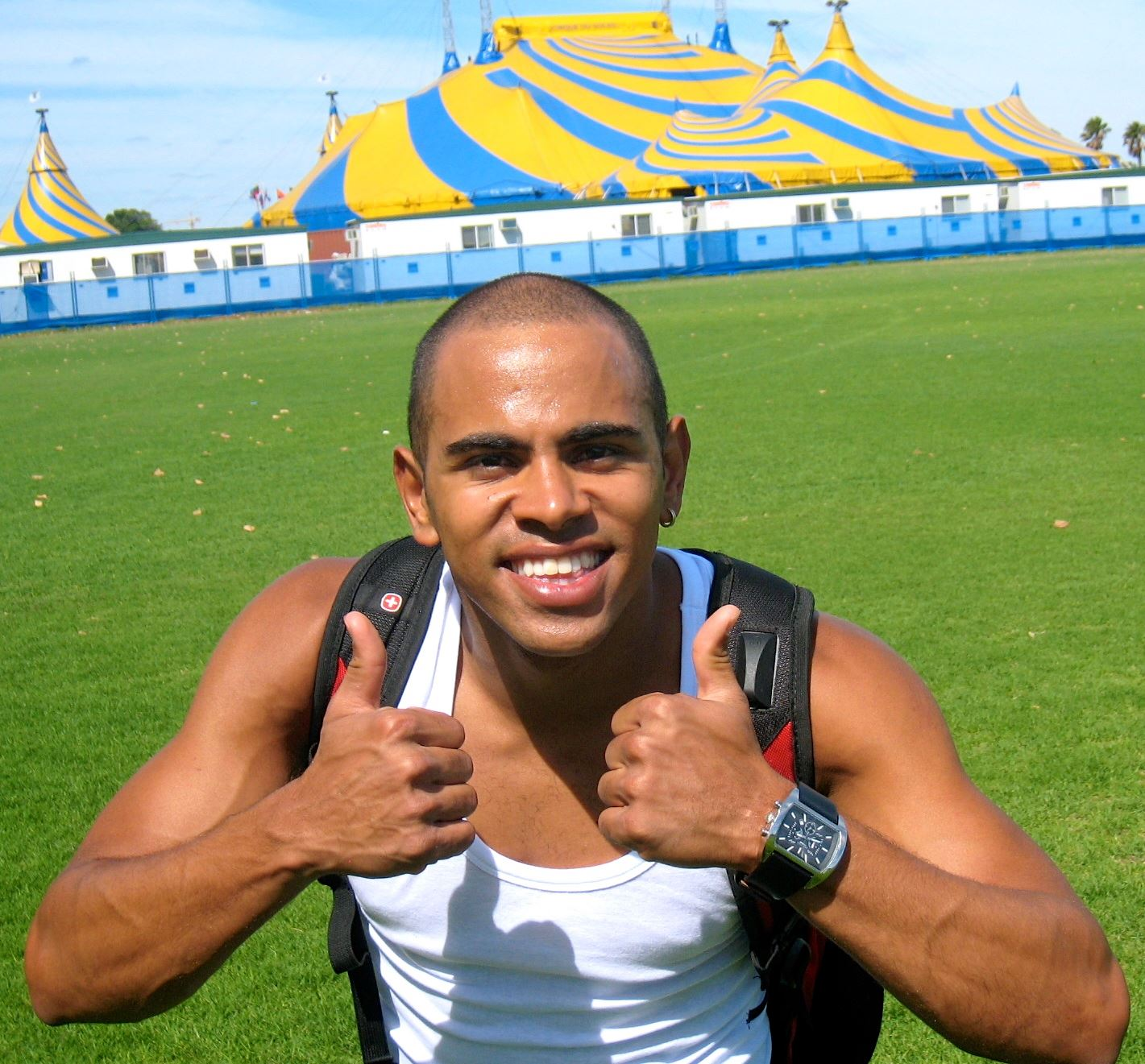
- Born: 1979 (age 46–47); Recife, Brazil
- Citizenship: Brazilian American
- Employer: Cirque Du Soleil

Wellington Lima (born 20 November 1979) is a Brazilian artistic acrobat and performer who works with Cirque du Soleil.

== Career ==
Wellington Lima, also known as Palhaçada (pall-ya-sah-dah), is a performer who specializes in capoeira, trampwall, and trampoline.

Wellington won the Brazilian National Championships of trampoline in 1997. After winning the National, Wellington went on to a 25-year career with Cirque du Soleil. He’s performed in many places around the world, including Australia, Brazil, Canada, Egypt, Germany, Holland, Japan, Spain, Switzerland, and the USA. He has performed in five Cirque Du Soleil productions: La Nouba, Dralion, Viva Elvis, Michael Jackson One, and OVO. He’s also performed for a variety of events, including the Pan American Games, the Oscars, Redbull Cirque Du Soleil High Performance Exchange, and Miss America. He holds several certifications including Performance Enhancement Specialist (NASM), Leadership Coach (SBCoaching), and Safety Certification (USAGymnastics).

== Productions with Cirque Du Soleil ==
1998–2004 – La Nouba in Orlando, FL—Primary Character/Acrobat

2004–2009 – Dralion World Tour—Performer/Acrobat

2009–2012 – Viva Elvis in Las Vegas, NV—Performer

2013–2018 – Michael Jackson ONE in Las Vegas, NV—Performer

2019–Present – OVO World Tour—Performer/Acrobat

== Stage career ==
25th Trampoline World Championships - Performer/Choreographer - 2007 - Quebec (CAN)

One Drop Foundation benefit show (CDS) - Performer/Choreographer - 2014 - Las Vegas (USA)

XVII Pan American Games(45/CDS) - Main Character - 2015 - Toronto (CAN)

== Television/Broadcast ==
CircusTalk's first-ever Members' Voice Award winner

CNN Interview

Visão Se7e

CadenaSer Intetview

La Voz de Galicia

XVII Pan American Games

Redbull Cirque Du Soleil High Performance Exchange

2002 Oscars

== Movies ==
Worlds Away 3D Movie

Sostrum DVD

La Nouba DVD

== Special Activities ==
Cirque Du Monde Social Outreach Program – General Coach - Worldwide

Capoeira Brazilian Pelourinho da Topázio - Instructor/Organizer - http://vegascapoeira.com/

Personal trainer – NASM
