= Tom Wellington (footballer, born 1894) =

Australian rules footballer (1894–1955)

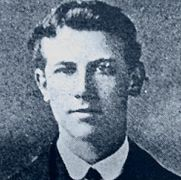

Personal information
- Full name: Thomas Wellington
- Born: 27 October 1894; Ballarat, Victoria
- Died: 17 July 1955; Adelaide
- Original team: CBC Parade

Playing career^{1}
Years	Club	Games (Goals)
1912–13	Melbourne	9 (0)
- ^{1} Playing statistics correct to the end of 1913.

Tom Wellington (27 October 1894 – 17 July 1955) was an Australian rules footballer who played with Melbourne in the Victorian Football League (VFL).
