= Wellington College =

Wellington College may refer to:

== New Zealand ==
- Wellington College, Wellington, New Zealand
- Wellington College of Education, now the Faculty of Education of Victoria University of Wellington, New Zealand
- Wellington Girls' College, Wellington, New Zealand

== Other places ==
- Wellington College, a fictional liberal arts college, setting of the 2005 novel On Beauty by Zadie Smith
- Wellington College, Berkshire, an independent school in Crowthorne, Berkshire, England
  - Wellington College International Shanghai
  - Wellington College International Tianjin
- Wellington College Belfast, a grammar school in Belfast, Northern Ireland
- Wellington Secondary College, a state high school in Mulgrave, Melbourne, Victoria, Australia

== See also ==
- Wellington School (disambiguation)
