= Laulasi Island =

Island in Solomon Islands

Native name: Akwalaafu
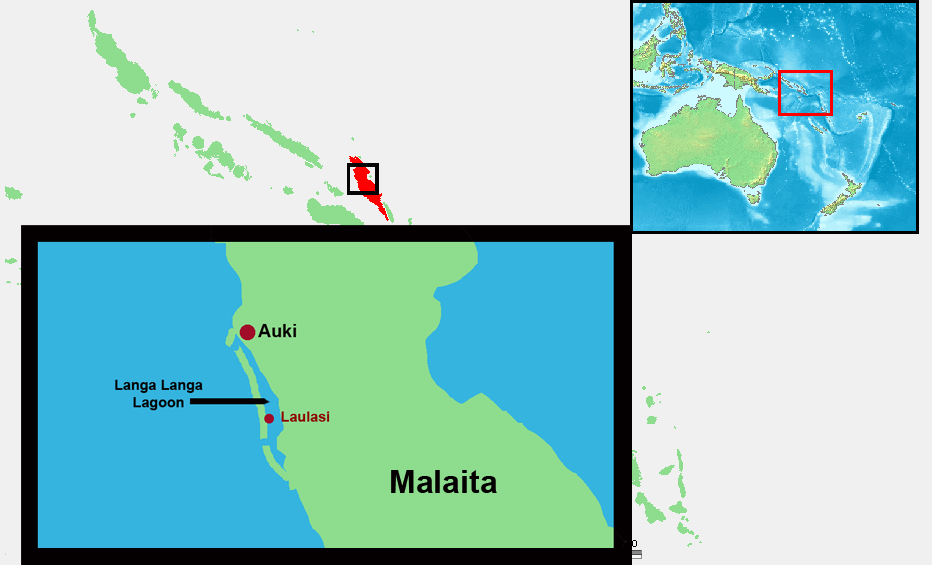
- Map of Langa Langa lagoon, Malaita
- Interactive map of Laulasi Island

Geography
- Location: South Pacific
- Coordinates: 8°52′43.22″S 160°44′46.55″E
- Archipelago: Solomon Islands (archipelago)
- Area: 100 m^{2} (1,100 sq ft)
- Length: 100 m (300 ft)
- Width: 100 m (300 ft)

Administration
- Solomon Islands
- Province: Malaita Province

Demographics
- Population: 20 (2008)
- Pop. density: 2.2/km^{2} (5.7/sq mi)
- Ethnic groups: Melanesian 100%

Laulasi island is an artificial island in the Langa Langa Lagoon, south of Auki on the island of Malaita in Solomon Islands. It is believed that hostilities among the inlanders of Malaita forced some people into the lagoon where over time they built their islands on sandbars after diving for coral. The religion of the island was based on prayers and offerings to the ghosts of dead ancestors, mediated by priests who kept their skulls and relics in tabu houses. Some ancestors were incarnated as sharks which protected their descendants. Langalanga is also the main source of the shell money now made in Solomon Islands.

== History ==
In Malaita legend, the first settlement on the island began around 3,000 BC at a place called Siale. The first places in the Malaita area to be settled were Dukwasi (Kwara'ae speaking people), and the Asi (man-made islands) namely: Aoke, Kaloka and Rarata in Langa Langa lagoon, Laulasi, Alite Koalia and Gwa'ata – Ta'alulolo.

It is also believed the early settlers originated from Mt. Kolovrat (Alasa'a), the highest peak on the main Malaita Island. The early settlers were believed to be castaways from the Alasa'a community. Some said they chose not to return to Alasa´a because of the distance. It is an approximately two days walk. And the main reason why they came is to fish and in search for other sea foods in the island of Launasi meaning I'm stuck now known as Laulasi. From then they named the island Launasi in relation to the expression.

After they had settled, other people began to arrive from different parts of Malaita and outside to settle in the Langalanga lagoon. They came from Small Malaita, Florida (Ngella), some came from the northern part of Guadalcanal believed to be from Longuvalasi area and others from the northern region of Malaita. Through inter-marriages, their descendants spread to the whole of the Langalanga lagoon. Certain cultural features or Tambu House (Place of the first settlements) are still preserved which attest to the settlement patterns that were made.

Part 1 Documentary Video

Part 2 Documentary Video

== 1800 to 1900 ==
In 1892 the Queensland government Australia abandoned the Pacific labour trade known as Blackbirding and in 1901 the Commonwealth of Australia enacted the Pacific Island Labourers Act 1901 which facilitated the deportation of Pacific Islanders that was the precursor to the White Australia policy.

Britain was provided with a "plausible excuse for protecting the Solomons" and so protecting their labour reserves. By declaring a protectorate, the British were able to justify keeping out other colonial powers.

In 1893 then Gibson of HMS Curacoa (1854) sailed around the islands to declare a protectorate with the only opposition by the Laulasi villages who refused the British flag. When Gibson asked why the flag was refused, the villages were afraid that their acceptance of it would signify to the bush people that by aligning themselves with Britain the lagoon dwellers were preparing for war and this would lead the bush people discontinuing trade with the lagoon people, who had no gardens and were dependent on food.

== 1911 – Author Jack London ==
American author Jack London travelled to Langa Langa in a yacht in 1908.

"We ran down the lagoon from Langa Langa, between mangrove swamps through passages scaresly wider than the Monota, and passed the reef villages of Kaloka and Auki. Like the founders of Venice, these salt water men were originally refugees form the mainland. Too weak to hold their own in the bush, survivors of village massacres, they fled to the sand banks of the lagoon. These sand banks they built up into islands and they were compelled to seek their provender from the sea. They developed canoo bodies, unable to walk about, spending all their time in the canoos, they became thick armed and broad shouldered with narrow waists and frail legs" (p 138).

"I sailed in the teak-built ketch, the Minota, on a blackbirding cruise to Malaita, and I took my wife along. The hatchet-marks were still raw on the door of our tiny stateroom advertising an event of a few months before. The event was the taking of Captain Mackenzie's head, Captain Mackenzie, at that time, being master of the Minota.... As we sailed in to Langa-Langa on the shore side of the lagoon, was Binu, the place where the Minota was captured a year previously and her captain killed by the bushmen of Malaita, having been hacked to pieces and eaten" (p 135).

"He(Mackenzie) believed in kindness. He also contended that better confidence was established by carrying no weapons. On his second trip to Malaita, recruiting, he ran into Bina, which is near Langa Langa. The rifles with which the boat's-crew should have been armed, were locked up in his cabin. When the whale-boat went ashore after recruits, he paraded around the deck without even a revolver on him. He was tomahawked. His head remains in Malaita. It was suicide.

The Log of the Snark states:

"..still bore the tomahawk marks where the Malaitans at Langa Langa several months before broke in for the trove of rifles and ammunition locked therein, after bloodily slaughtering Jansen's predecessor, Captain Mackenzie. The burning of the vessel was somehow prevented by the black crew, but this was so unprecedented that the owner feared some complicity between them and the attacking party. However, it could not be proved, and we sailed with the majority of this same crew. The present skipper smilingly warned us that the same tribe still required two more heads from the Minota, to square up for deaths on the Ysabel plantation (p 387).

"Three fruitless days were spent at Su'u. The Minota got no recruits from the bush and the bushmen got no heads from the Minota. We towed out with a whaleboat and ran along the coast to Langa Langa, a large village of salt-water people built with labour on a sand bank – literally built up".

== World War II ==
On the morning of 7 August 1942 (same date as the US Landings on Guadalcanal),

"..seven US planes bombed the island. The reason was due to an error namely that the Americans mistook Laulasi for the Japanese camp at Afufu in North Malaita. Which resulted in the killing 24 children, destroying the shell money industry and the incident still remains the subject of an unresolved compensation claim".

The British resident commissioner wrote in his diary:

"7 US planes bombed Laulasi village – 18 killed – most inexplicable as no enemy repeorted there"(Marchant 7 Aug 1942)

"The bombing of Laulasi island was the worst loss of civilian lives in the entire Solomon Islands conflict".

== Cultural Practices and Beliefs ==
"The LangaLanga and Kwara'ae people more or less have the same cultural and traditional practices and follow the same chiefly system. Male children for example are more valued than females because they will continue with the line or tribe. Girls are not so preferred because they leave the community when they get married. Boys are separated from their parents when they are around 12 or 13 years old to live separate in the men's houses. Around that age, they are taught by the fathers basic important skills such as fishing, building houses, making canoes or cutting and sewing sago palm leaves".

"Girls on the other hand, they stay with their mother and taught household chores such as cooking, weeding around the house, cleaning and looking after their younger brothers of sisters. One of the important things that girls learn at an early age too is how to make shell money".

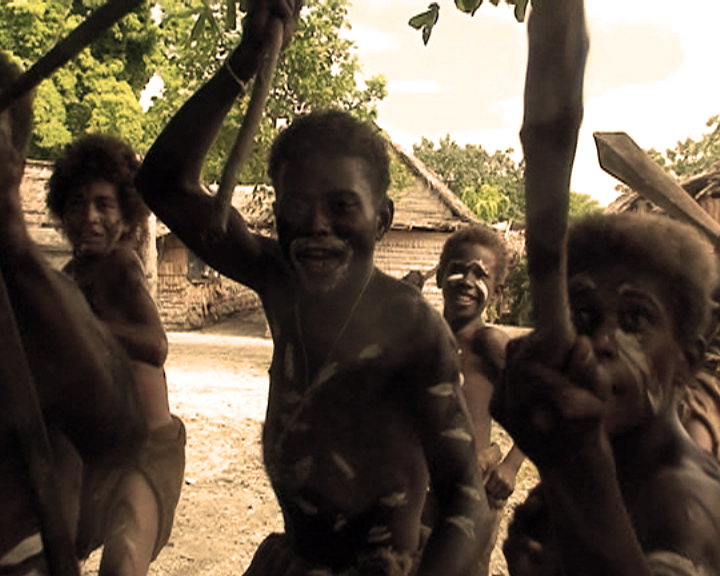
Tribal warriors challenging the visitors. Taken 2008

Historically, chiefs in the Langalanga lagoon are looked upon as very important in uniting communities. Normally, chiefs are chosen from chiefly tribes or clan. Villages in the past used to have threes chiefs, Fa'atabu who makes offering and communicated with the spirits and ancestors, the Ramo is responsible for tribal warfare and Waenotolo is the chief responsible for controlling, organising, leadership and uniting the whole community.

Priests in Laulasi live in "spirit houses," and when they die, their bodies are taken to the nearby village of Alite to decompose, after which the skulls are brought back and placed in a "house of skulls."

On the side of the island is an inlet where custom priests calls the sharks to come to the surface. The sharks are re-incarnation of the people's ancestors who died many years before. They also offer sacrifices to the sharks in the form of pigs. Ordinary men are not allowed to visit the shark site unless invited by the custom priest.

According to local legend, a fisherman whose boat capsizes at sea may call on a shark to rescue him; after being rescued and returned to shore, he must sacrifice a pig, or else the shark will eat him next time he goes out to sea.

By the 1960s many of the LangaLanga villages were Christian. Many of the communities previously sited on the artificial islands had been shifted to the mainland, with encouragement from the missionaries anxious to promote a clean break with the pagan past, and inducement in the form of greater access to land for subsistence farming.

== Last Pagan priest ==
In 1980, Moses Beogo who was the last Pagan priest (Fata'abu) on Laulasi and the last to perform the shark calling tradition, died. His skull is kept with the skulls of the other priests.

== Tourism ==
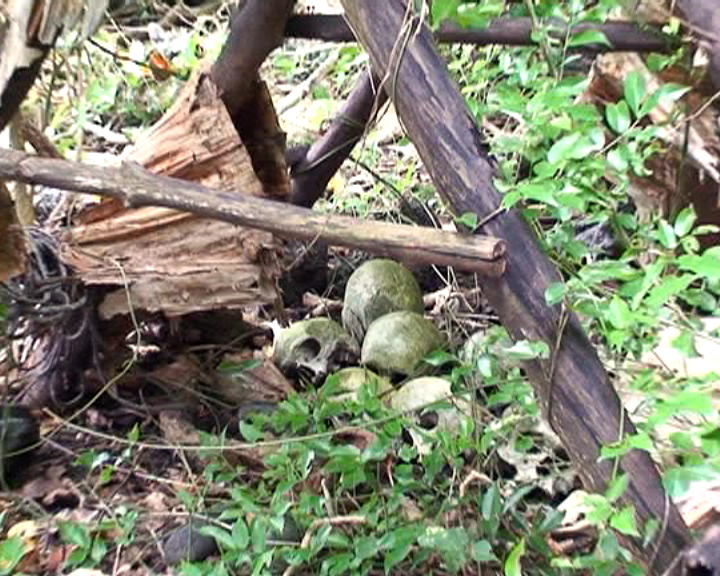
An "apartment" to store Priest Heads of another tribe. Taken 2008

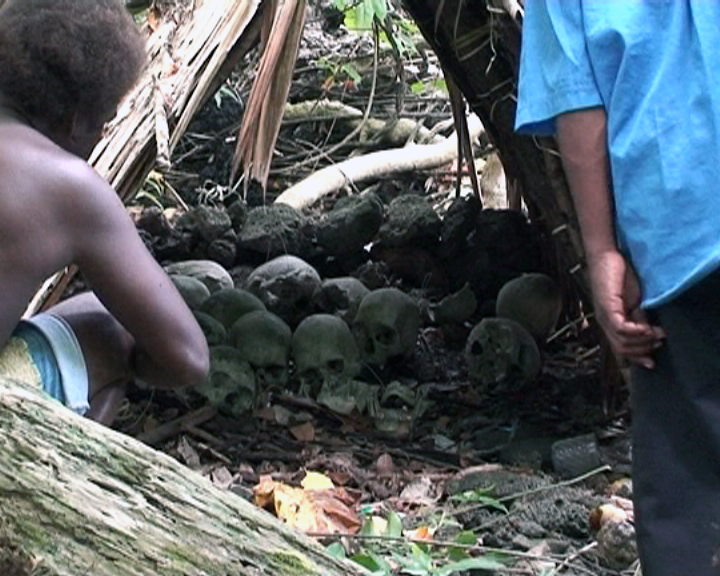
Another "apartment" to store Priest Heads of one tribe. Taken 2008

A report on the British Solomon Islands dated 1972 states:

"where the traditional process of making shell money and other island activities may be observed, once again proved popular with the tourists".

In 1981 a symposium in the then U.S.S.R heard of Solomon Islands that:

"One of the more successful ventures in the tourist industry is Laulasi Adventure Tours Ltd"

In 1982 a research paper by the Australian National University claimed:

"Laulasi has become one of the notable tourist attractions of the South Pacific – with all the predictable consequences for the integrity of the ancestral religion and the fabric of community social life. Moreover, the expatriate entrepreneurs were Baha'is, and offered a ready-made religious accommodation between ancestors and capitalism".

In 1997 an author stated:

"Laulasi village, at the centre of the lagoon, makes a business of being nice to visitors. A real business, because it charges more than a Disneyland ticket to tread its man made shores".

In 2006 The Last Heathen by Charles Montgomery concludes that for this he was expecting to find a volatile mixture of the tribal, pagan religion and Christianity. He found a comfortable hybrid instead, the two religions living in harmony.

In November 2008 on an invitation from the Laulasi community a delegation from RAMSI was invited to attend to officiate the "re-opening" of the Laulasi Tourist Industry. Members took footage and photographs with a view of assisting with publicity. The delegation was escorted to the dock with a traditional war canoe trailing and a 10-seat war canoe leading with the latter being Laulasi women singing a traditional welcome song.

On arrival at the dock, warriors confronted the delegation until a sum of shell money was presented to the warriors as a sign of peace. Once this gift was received the village girls offered the delegation refreshments.

The men of the delegation were permitted to tour the three "apartments" that each represented a tribe. In each apartment, the skulls of past priests were laid atop one another. Once this tour concluded, the delegation was presented with a display of song and dance and formalities and a demonstration of the minting process of the shell money. The village women then sang as the delegation sailed away.

== Boatbuilding ==
The Annual Report on the British Solomon Islands dated 1953 states

"..a flourishing boat building industry has been established and cutters are being built for the inter-island trade. A boatbuilding school has been established.

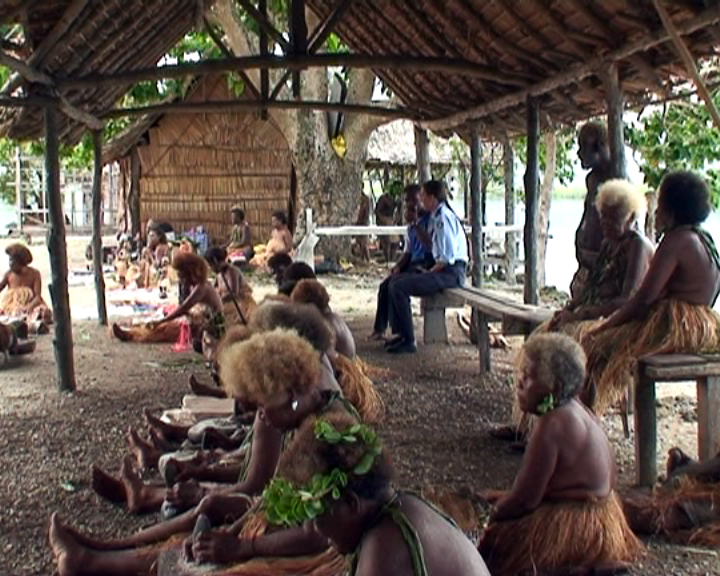
The shell money minting production line. Taken 2008

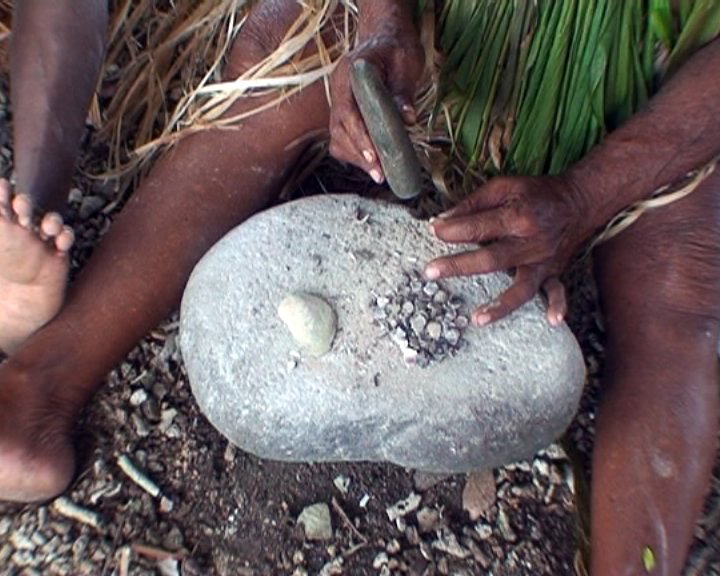
Cutting the shell with a sharp stone. Taken 2008

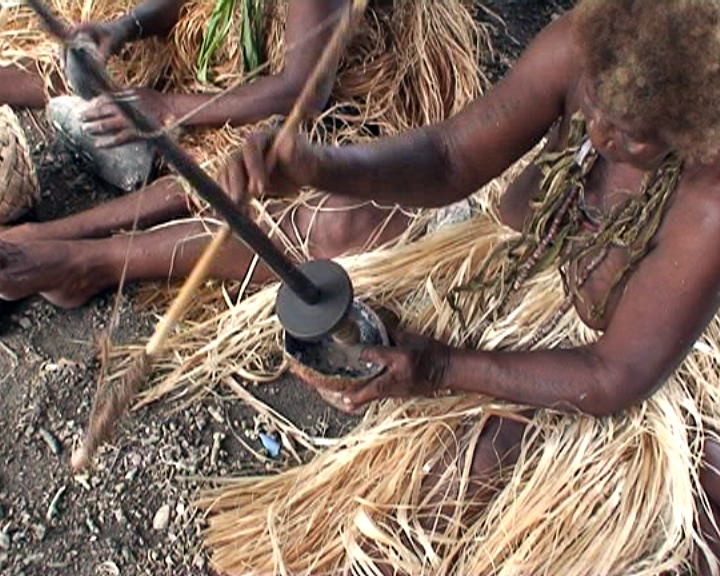
Drilling the hole with a traditional drill. Taken 2008

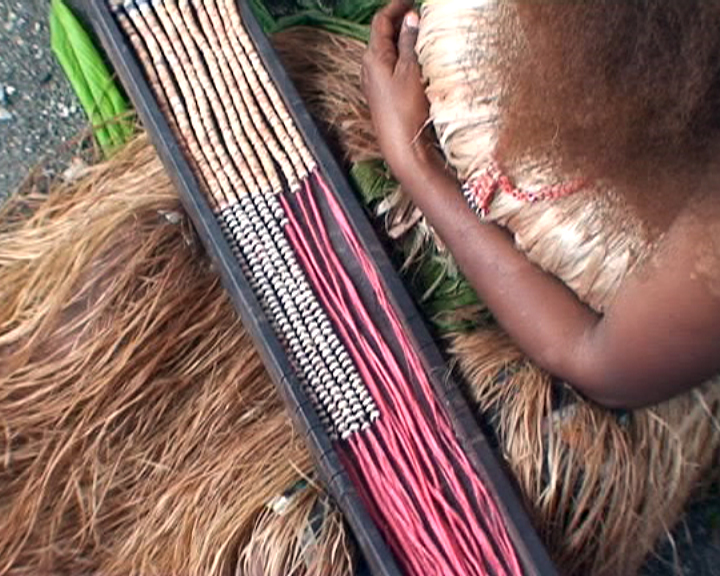
Beading the shells for the finished product. Taken 2008

Generally, the Lanagalanga people are very skilful boat builders. It can be said that it is unique to the constituency. In the early stages people used to build dingies. Later, with improvements in skills, they built what they referred to as 'CARTER BOATS' which is sharp at both ends. They used sails to travel around Malaita and to other Islands such as Gudalcanal and Isabel. Commercial boat building in the constituency started in the 1960s around the time when the Government established a boat building school in Auki. Mr. Frank Faulker who used to teach at the school and who now settled in Auki, is said to be the main person behind the success of the industry in Langalanga.

== Shell Money ==
The history of shell-money making in the langa langa lagoon is patchy. Stories retold from myths said that the first person to introduce shell money to the Langalanga lagoon was a woman from Buin in Bougainville. She was banish and floated in a coconut shell from Buin to Guadalcanal and finally to Malaita and landed at Tafilo a village at Lalana near Laulasi. Traditionally, there had been substantive trade between the Langalanga people and people from Buin in shell money until the emergence of the Bougainville crises. Most of the private ship owners from the constituency generated capital through shell money trade to build their ships. They took shell money to Buin and traded it for cash and used the cash to build wooden boats.

As the production rate increased, shell resources were depleted, particularly in Langalanga lagoon. Even in the 1970s some types of shell were rare.

Four different types of shell are used in making shell money, A red lipped rock oyster called Romu (chama pacifica), white shell known as Kee (Beguina semi-orbiculata), black horse mussel shells called Kurila (Atrina vexillum) and thick white disks from a rigid cockle known as Kakadu (Anadara granosa)

What makes this money valuable are the purple disks, whose number per string is carefully calculated and which are made from the lips of the Romu shell which the Langa Langa people collect twice a year from the lagoon areas of the clan of the Lau tribe. The chief of the Lau clan allows them to fish for the shells in exchange for half the money strings.

== Notable people ==
- Bartholomew Ulufa'alu (25 December 1950 – 25 May 2007) was the Prime Minister of the Solomon Islands from 27 August 1997 to 30 June 2000.

== See also ==
- Youtube video of Laulasi Island
