= Langa Langa Lagoon =

Natural lagoon in Malaita, Solomon Islands

Native name: Akwalaafu
- Interactive map of Langa Langa Lagoon

Geography
- Location: Pacific Ocean
- Coordinates: 08°52′39″S 160°44′42″E
- Archipelago: Solomon Islands
- Area: 21 km^{2} (8.1 sq mi)
- Length: 21 km (13 mi)
- Width: 1 km (0.6 mi)

Administration
- Solomon Islands
- Province: Malaita Province
- Largest settlement: Honiara (pop. 54,600 (2003 est.))

Demographics
- Population: (2008)
- Ethnic groups: Melanesian 100%

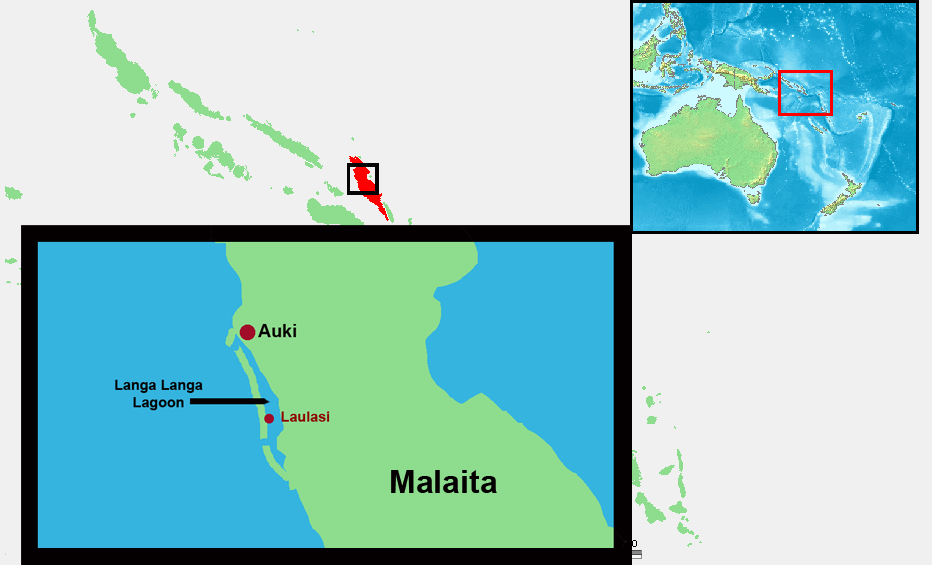
A map of Langa Langa lagoon, Malaita, Solomon Islands.

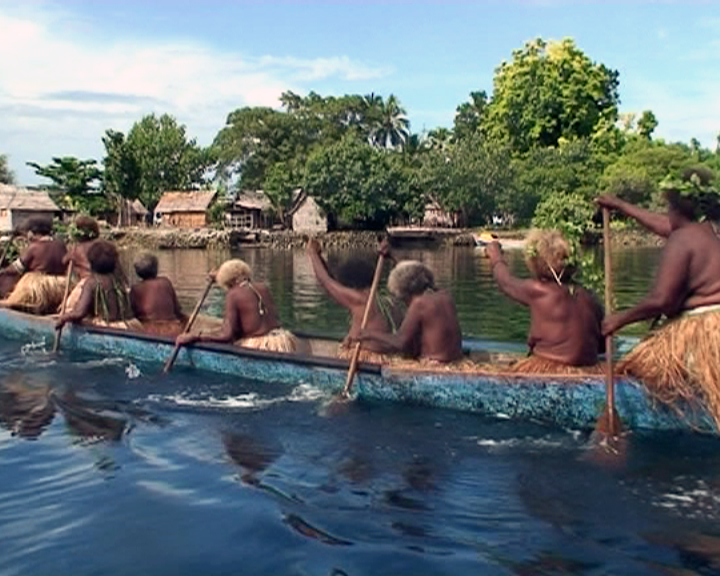
Laulasi Island. Note the man-made walls. The sacred area is located to the right of the island. Taken 2008

Langa Langa Lagoon or Akwalaafu is a natural lagoon on the West coast of Malaita near the provincial capital Auki within Solomon Islands. The lagoon is 21 km in length and just under 1 km wide. The "lagoon people" or "salt water people" live on small artificial islands built up on sand bars over time where they were forced to flee from the headhunters of mainland Malaita.

The islands in the lagoon are renowned for their shell money minting process, their "shark worship" beliefs, their shipbuilding skills and tourism. The most popular and well known of these islands is Laulasi which has had a thriving tourism industry dating back to the early 1970s; although tourism is largely underdeveloped. The Langa Langa Lagoon provides opportunities for snorkeling, and the villagers provide shell making demonstrations.

== Etymology ==
Langa in Pijin means "along" or long.

== History ==
In Malaita legend, the first settlement on the island began around 3,000 BC at a place called Siale. The first places in the Malaita area to be settled were Dukwasi (Kwara'ae speaking people), and the Asi (man-made islands) namely: Aoke, Kaloka and Rarata in Langa Langa lagoon, Laulasi, Alite Koalia and Gwa'ata – Ta'alulolo. It is also believed the early settlers originated from Mt. Kolovrat (Alasa'a), the highest peak on the main Malaita Island. The early settlers were believed to be castaways from the Alasa'a community. They said, the people were forced out from the community because of bad behaviour and disrespect for custom and traditional way of living.

During their journey the final stopover was at Laulasi where they felt it was safe from enemies. After they had settled, other people began to arrive from different parts of Malaita and outside to settle in the Langalanga lagoon. They came from Small Malaita, Florida (Ngella), some came from the northern part of Guadalcanal believed to be from Longuvalasi area and others from the northern region of Malaita. Through inter-marriages, their descendants spread to the whole of the Langalanga lagoon. Certain cultural features or Tambu House (Place of the first settlements) are still preserved which attest to the settlement patterns that were made.

=== 1800 to 1900 ===
From the 1870s to 1903 Malaitan men (and some women) comprised the largest number of Solomon Islander participants in the indentured labour trade to Queensland, Australia and to Fiji. The 1870s were a time of illegal recruiting practices known as Blackbirding. Malaitans are known to have volunteered as indentured labourers with some making their second trip to work on plantations, although the labour system remained exploitative. In 1901 the Commonwealth of Australia enacted the Pacific Island Labourers Act 1901 which facilitated the deportation of Pacific Islanders that was the precursor to the White Australia policy. However many islanders remained and formed the South Sea Islander community of Australia.

In 1893 then Gibson of HMS Curacoa (1854) sailed around the islands to declare a protectorate with the only opposition by the Laulasi villagers who refused the British flag. When Gibson asked why the flag was refused, the villages were afraid that their acceptance of it would signify to the bush people that by aligning themselves with Britain the lagoon dwellers were preparing for war and this would lead the bush people discontinuing trade with the lagoon people, who had no gardens and were dependent on food. Britain was provided with a "plausible excuse for protecting the Solomons" and so protecting their labour reserves. By declaring a protectorate, the British were able to justify keeping out other colonial powers.

=== 1911 – Author Jack London ===
American author Jack London traveled to Langa Langa in a yacht in 1908.

"We ran down the lagoon from Langa Langa, between mangrove swamps through passages scaresly wider than the Monota, and passed the reef villages of Kaloka and Auki. Like the founders of Venice, these salt water men were originally refugees form the mainland. Too weak to hold their own in the bush, survivors of village massacres, they fled to the sand banks of the lagoon. These sand banks they built up into islands and they were compelled to seek their provender from the sea. They developed canoo bodies, unable to walk about, spending all their time in the canoos, they became thick armed and broad shouldered with narrow waists and frail legs" (p 138)

"I sailed in the teak-built ketch, the Minota, on a blackbirding cruise to Malaita, and I took my wife along. The hatchet-marks were still raw on the door of our tiny stateroom advertising an event of a few months before. The event was the taking of Captain Mackenzie's head, Captain Mackenzie, at that time, being master of the Minota.... As we sailed in to Langa-Langa on the shore side of the lagoon, was Binu, the place where the Minota was captured a year previously and her captain killed by the bushmen of Malaita, having been hacked to pieces and eaten" (p 135)

"He (Mackenzie) believed in kindness. He also contended that better confidence was established by carrying no weapons. On his second trip to Malaita, recruiting, he ran into Bina, which is near Langa Langa. The rifles with which the boat's-crew should have been armed, were locked up in his cabin. When the whale-boat went ashore after recruits, he paraded around the deck without even a revolver on him. He was tomahawked. His head remains in Malaita. It was suicide.

The Log of the Snark states:

"..still bore the tomahawk marks where the Malaitans at Langa Langa several months before broke in for the trove of rifles and ammunition locked therein, after bloodily slaughtering Jansen's predecessor, Captain Mackenzie. The burning of the vessel was somehow prevented by the black crew, but this was so unprecedented that the owner feared some complicity between them and the attacking party. However, it could not be proved, and we sailed with the majority of this same crew. The present skipper smilingly warned us that the same tribe still required two more heads from the Minota, to square up for deaths on the Ysabel plantation. (p 387)

"Three fruitless days were spent at Su'u. The Minota got no recruits from the bush and the bushmen got no heads from the Minota. We towed out with a whaleboat and ran along the coast to Langa Langa, a large village of salt-water people built with labour on a sand bank – literally built up"

=== World War 2 ===
The island of Laulasi was the subject of the worst civilian casualties in the Solomon Islands during a bombing raid by American bombers during World War II.

== Cultural Practices and Beliefs ==
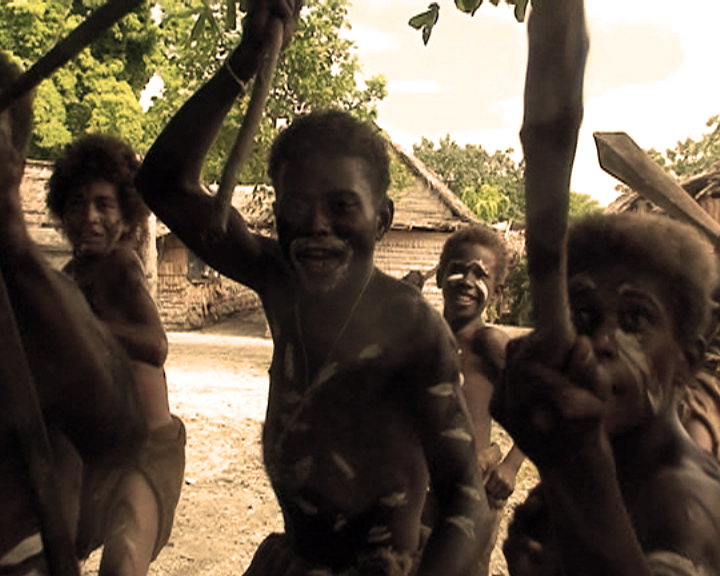
Tribal warriors challenging the visitors, 2008.

The LangaLanga/Wala and Kwara'ae people more or less have the same cultural and traditional practices and follow the same chiefly system. Male children for example are more valued than females because they will continue with the line or tribe. Girls are not so preferred because they leave the community when they get married. Boys are separated from their parents when they are around 12 or 13 years old to live separate in the men's houses. Around that age, they are taught by the fathers basic important skills such as fishing, building houses, making canoes or cutting and sewing sago palm leaves.

Girls on the other hand, they stay with their mother and are taught household cores such as cooking, weeding around the house, cleaning and looking after their younger brothers or sisters. One of the important things that girls learn at an early age too is how to make shell money.

Historically, chiefs in the Langalanga lagoon are looked upon as very important in uniting communities. Normally, chiefs are chosen from chiefly tribes or clan. Villages in the past used to have threes chiefs, Fa'atabu who makes offering and communicated with the spirits and ancestors, the Ramo is responsible for tribal warfare and Waenotolo is the chief responsible for controlling, organising, leadership and uniting the whole community.

Priests in Laulasi live in "spirit houses", and when they die, their bodies are taken to the nearby village of Alite to decompose, after which the skulls are brought back and placed in a "house of skulls."

On one side of the island is an inlet where custom priests calls the sharks to come to the surface. The sharks are re-incarnation of the people's ancestors who died many years before. They also offer sacrifices to the sharks in the form of pigs. Ordinary men are not allowed to visit the shark site unless invited by the custom priest.

According to local legend, a fisherman whose boat capsizes at sea may call on a shark to rescue him; after being rescued and returned to shore, he must sacrifice a pig, or else the shark will eat him next time he goes out to sea.

By the 1960s many of the LangaLanga villages were Christian. Many of the communities previously sited on the artificial islands had been shifted to the mainland, with encouragement from the missionaries anxious to promote a clean break with the pagan past, and inducement in the form of greater access to land for subsistence farming.

== Economy ==
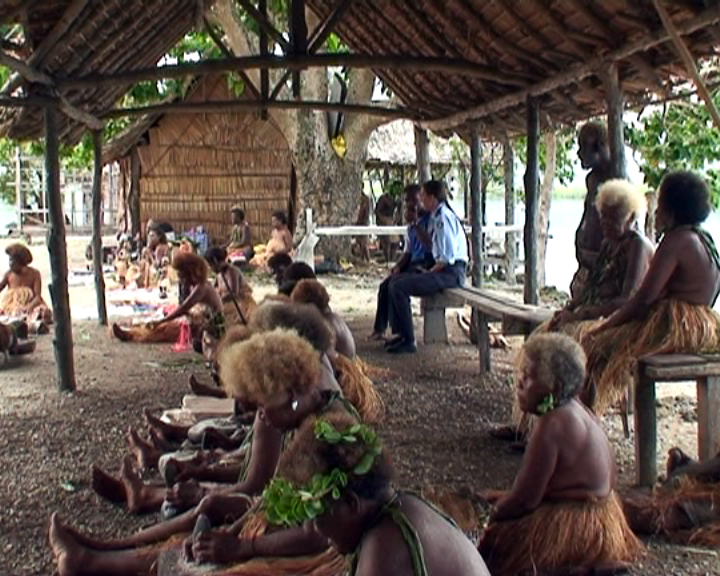
The shell money minting production line, 2008

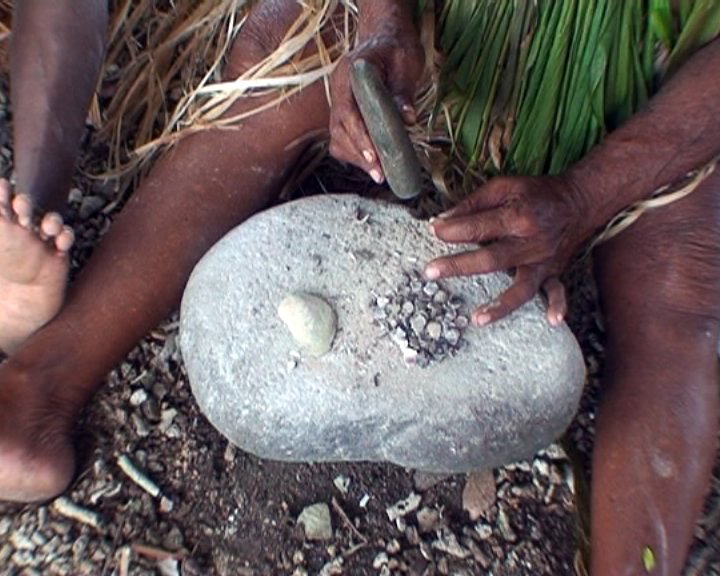
Cutting the shell with a sharp stone, 2008

Traditionally, there had been substantive trade between the Langalanga people and people from Buin (Bougainville) in shell money until the emergence of the Bougainville crisis. Most of the private ship owners from the constituency generated capital through shell money trade to build their ships. They took shell money to Buin and traded it for cash and used the cash to build wooden boats.

Until recently, it has been a driving business which can be conservatively valued at $50,000 to $100,000 per annum. Shell money products include bracelets, necklaces, Tafuliae, Ha'a (smaller beads shell money used in some parts of the country), ear rings, finger ring, 'head bands' etc.

At present, unfortunately, the industry is slowly declining due to input scarcity. The major supplier of raw material South Malaita is not willing to supply any more shells. The only supplier which still sell raw materials to Langalanga people is Western Province although not reliable and in very small quantity.

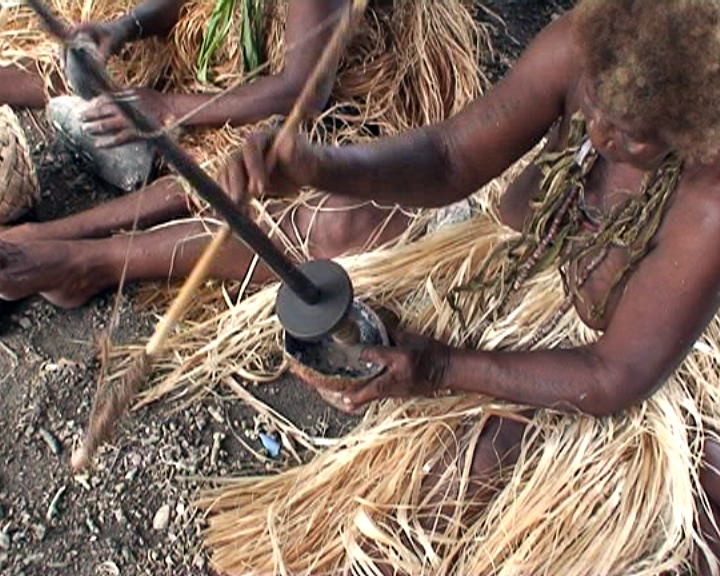
Drilling the hole with a traditional drill, 2008

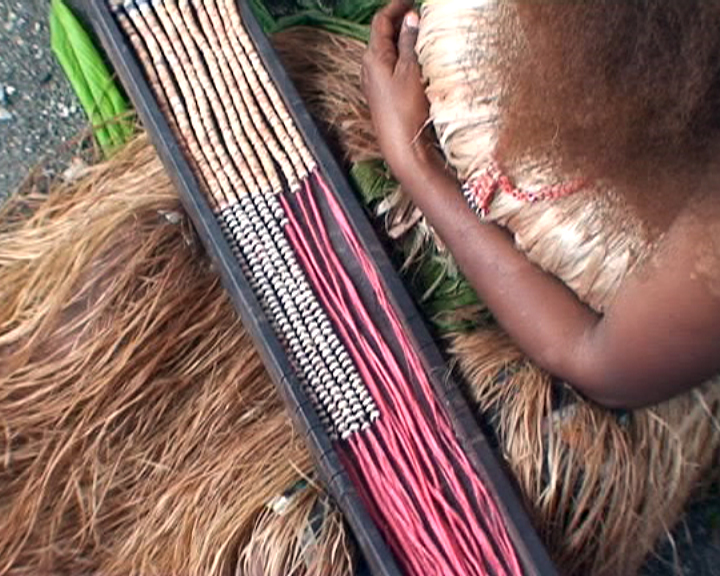
Beading the shells for the finished product, 2008

== Shell money ==
Stories retold from myths said that the first person to introduce shell money to the Langalanga lagoon was a woman from Buin in Bougainville. She was banished and floated in a coconut shell from Buin to Guadalcanal and finally to Malaita and landed at Tafilo, a village at Lalana near Laulasi.

Shell money has been used as a cultural token that is handed over on marriage (bride-price) or as compensation for a wrong done to a person (such as to the wronged husband following adultery being exposed).

As the production rate increased, shell resources were depleted, particularly in Langalanga lagoon. Even in the 1970s some types of shell were rare. The limited land available for agriculture, has the consequence that the production of shell money is a continuing source of income. The creation of shell money is also an important cultural symbol to the people of the Langalanga lagoon.

Four different types of shell are used in making shell money, A red lipped rock oyster known as "romu" (Chama pacifica in the family Chamidae), white shell known as "ke'e" (Beguina semiorbiculata in the Carditidae), black horse mussel shells called "kurila" (Atrina vexillum in the Pinnidae) and thick white disks from a rigid cockle known as "kakadu" or "kakandu" (Anadara granosa in the Arcidae)

== Boatbuilding ==
The Annual Report on the British Solomon Islands dated 1953 states

"..a flourishing boat building industry has been established and cutters are being built for the inter-island trade. A boatbuilding school has been established.

Generally, the Lanagalanga people are very skilful boat builders. It can be said that it is unique to the constituency. In the early stages people used to build dingies. Later, with improvements in skills, they built what they referred to as "Carter boats" which are sharp at both ends. They used sails to travel around Malaita and to other Islands such as Guadalcanal and Isabel. Commercial boat building in the constituency started in the 1960s around the time when the Government established a boat building school in Auki. Mr. Frank Faulker who used to teach at the school and who now settled in Auki, is said to be the main person behind the success of the industry in Langalanga.

== Fishing practices ==
The people of Langalanga developed fishing practices for the lagoon and the ocean with the fishing usually done from a canoe. A common method is angling, that was formerly carried out using lure hooks made of shell shanks or with baited hooks made of bone or shell. In the lagoon the fishing practices included spearing, netting, and collecting marine invertebrates, including by diving. Some traditional fishing practices have been abandoned include using fish traps (afeafe and ere’ere), the fish-drive (rarabu) using coconut leaves, fish-poisoning, kite-fishing (kwaferao), and angling with a straight hook (lana).

== See also ==
- Youtube video of Laulasi Island
