= Alite (disambiguation) =

Alite is a name for tricalcium silicate, Ca_{3}SiO_{5}.

Alite may also refer to:

- Alite Island, an island of the Solomon Islands

== People with the surname ==
- John Alite (born 1962), American mobster
