= Sisikolo =

Traditional Solomon food

Ko'aa soup, Koa soup, Sisikolo
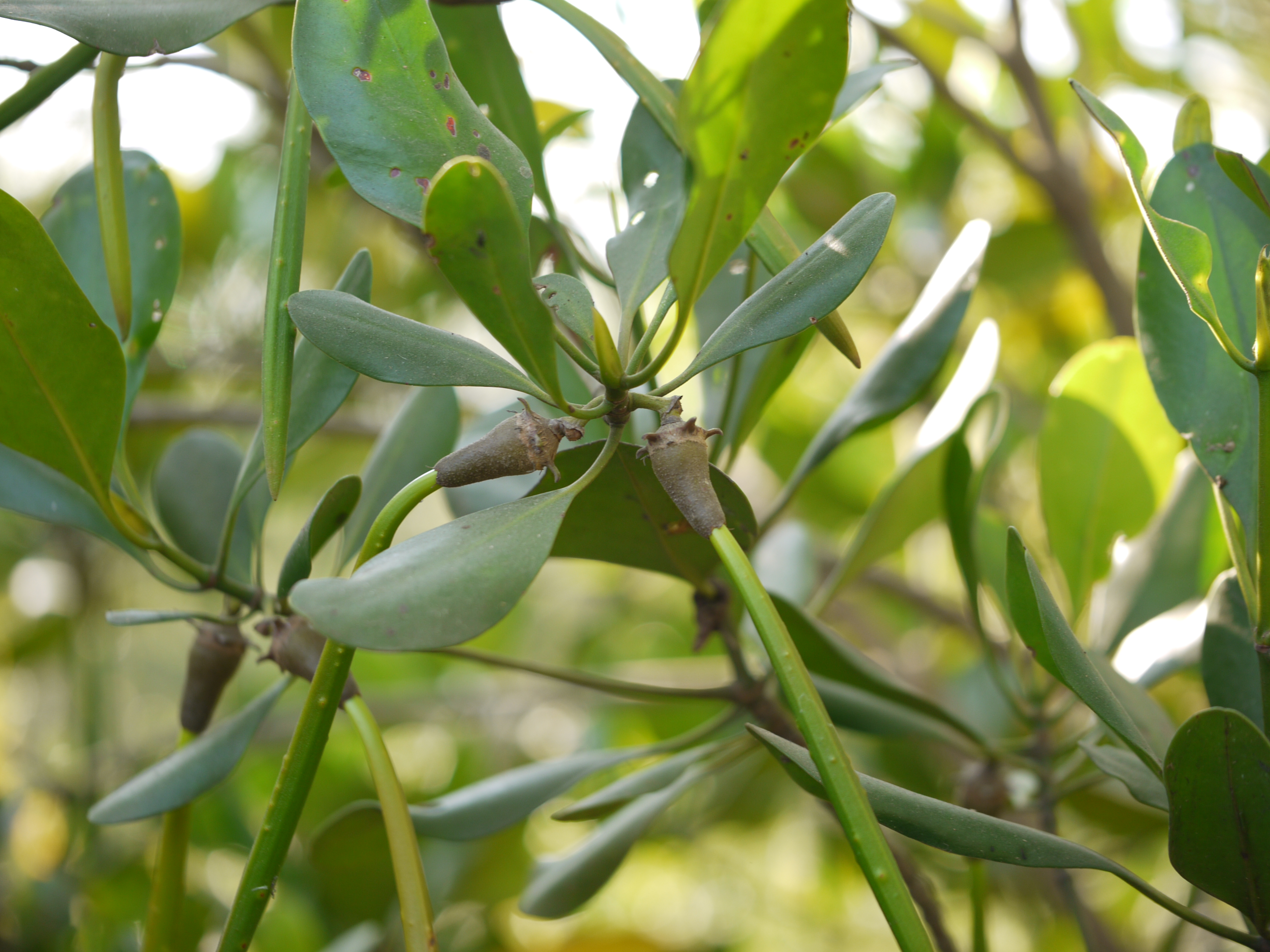
- Koa, the mangrove fruit in the local language of Langa Langa Lagoon. Photo taken in India.
- Type: Stew
- Place of origin: Solomon Islands
- Region or state: Akwalaafu
- Main ingredients: Mangrove beans, Onions, Coconuts, fish

Sisikolo, also known as Koa / Koa'a soup, is a unique and traditional stew from the Solomon Islands. Not much is known about this unique dish to the lack of research and the isolation of the country. The main ingredient of the dish is Koa, the fruit of Bruguiera gymnorhiza, coconuts, fish, and onions, along with other ingredients sometimes added. Within the gastronomy of the people of Langa Langa Lagoon, there is a type of dish that Sisikolo is a part of, called Koa dishes; e.g. Milk Koa, Koa Soup. Yellowfin tuna is most commonly used, but any meat/protein can be used. It is commonly served with traditional savory cassava pudding.

== See also ==
- Bruguiera gymnorhiza
- Cuisine of Solomon Islands
