= Beguina semiorbiculata =

Scientific classification
- Kingdom: Animalia
- Phylum: Mollusca
- Class: Bivalvia
- Order: Carditida
- Family: Carditidae
- Genus: Beguina
- Species: B. semiorbiculata

Binomial name
- Beguina semiorbiculata (Linnaeus, 1758)

Synonyms
- Chama semiorbiculata Linnaeus, 1758; Chama phrenitica Born, 1778; Chama reniformis Gmelin, 1791; Beguina nephritica Röding, 1798; Cardita irregularis Clessin, 1888

Species of bivalve mollusc

Beguina semiorbiculata, commonly known as the half-round cardita, is a species of bivalve mollusk in the family Carditidae, inhabiting the Indo/West Pacific region. It may be locally common in certain locales.

This species typically embeds itself within hard corals. It is known to readily bioaccumulate various heavy metals, making it a bioindicator for metals other than zinc.

== See also ==
- Pedum spondyloideum, a scallop with a similar coral-boring niche
