= Faore =

Island in Solomon Islands

Native name: Matuiloto
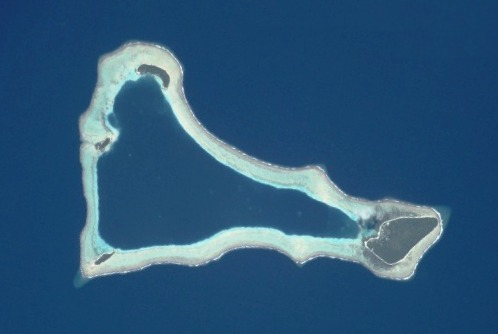
- Faore is the middle one of the three western islands
- Interactive map of Faore

Geography
- Location: South Pacific
- Coordinates: 8°23′48.84″S 162°52′12.75″E
- Archipelago: Sikaiana

Administration
- Solomon Islands
- Province: Malaita Province

Demographics
- Population: 0

Faore is an island of the Sikaiana atoll in the Malaita Province, Solomon Islands in the South Pacific. The local name is Matuiloto.

== Geography ==
Faore is one of four islands of Sikaiana, a remote tropical coral atoll. Faore lies in the middle of the western end of the atoll and is reported to be the second in size after the Sikaiana island. The other islands of the atoll are Tehaolei (north), Sikaiana (east), and Matuavi (south).
