= Anuta Paina =

Island in Solomon Islands

Coordinates: 9.166°S 161.263°E

Geography
- Location: South Pacific Ocean
- Archipelago: Solomon Islands

Administration
- Solomon Islands
- Province: Malaita

Anuta Paina is an island in Malaita Province, Solomon Islands. It is located off the east coast of Malaita Island.
