= Tehaolei =

Island of the Sikaiana atoll, Solomon Islands

Native name: Tehaolei
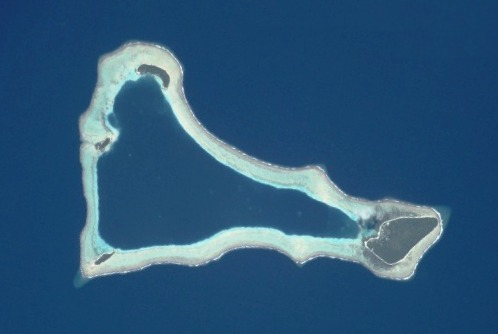
- Faore is the northern one of the three western islands
- Interactive map of Tehaolei

Geography
- Location: South Pacific
- Coordinates: 8°22′45.12″S 162°52′56.26″E
- Archipelago: Sikaiana

Administration
- Solomon Islands
- Province: Malaita Province

Demographics
- Population: 0

Tehaolei is an inhabited island of the Sikaiana atoll in the Malaita Province, Solomon Islands in the South Pacific.

== Geography ==
Tehaolei is one of four islands of Sikaiana, a remote tropical coral atoll. Tehaolei lies in the north-western end of the atoll. The other islands of the atoll are Sikaiana, (east), Matuiloto (west), and Matuavi (south).
