= Matuavi =

Island in Solomon Islands

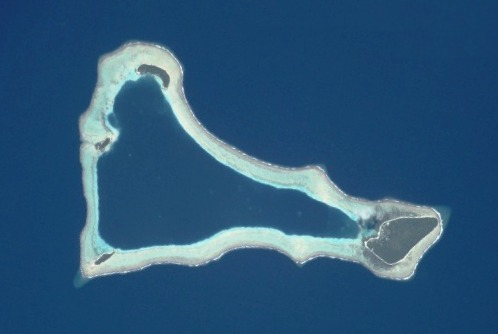
- Matuavi lies at the south-western end of the atoll
- Interactive map of Matuavi

Geography
- Location: South Pacific
- Coordinates: 8°25′21.35″S 162°52′13.85″E
- Archipelago: Sikaiana

Administration
- Solomon Islands
- Province: Malaita Province

Demographics
- Population: 0

Matuavi (also Mutuavi) is an island of the Sikaiana atoll in the Malaita Province, Solomon Islands in the South Pacific.

== Geography ==
Matuavi is one of four islands of Sikaiana, a remote tropical coral atoll. Matuavi lies at the south-western end of the atoll. The other islands of the atoll are Sikaiana (east), Tehaolei (north), and Faore (west).
