= Maana'omba =

Island in Solomon Islands

Coordinates: 8.306°S 160.794°E

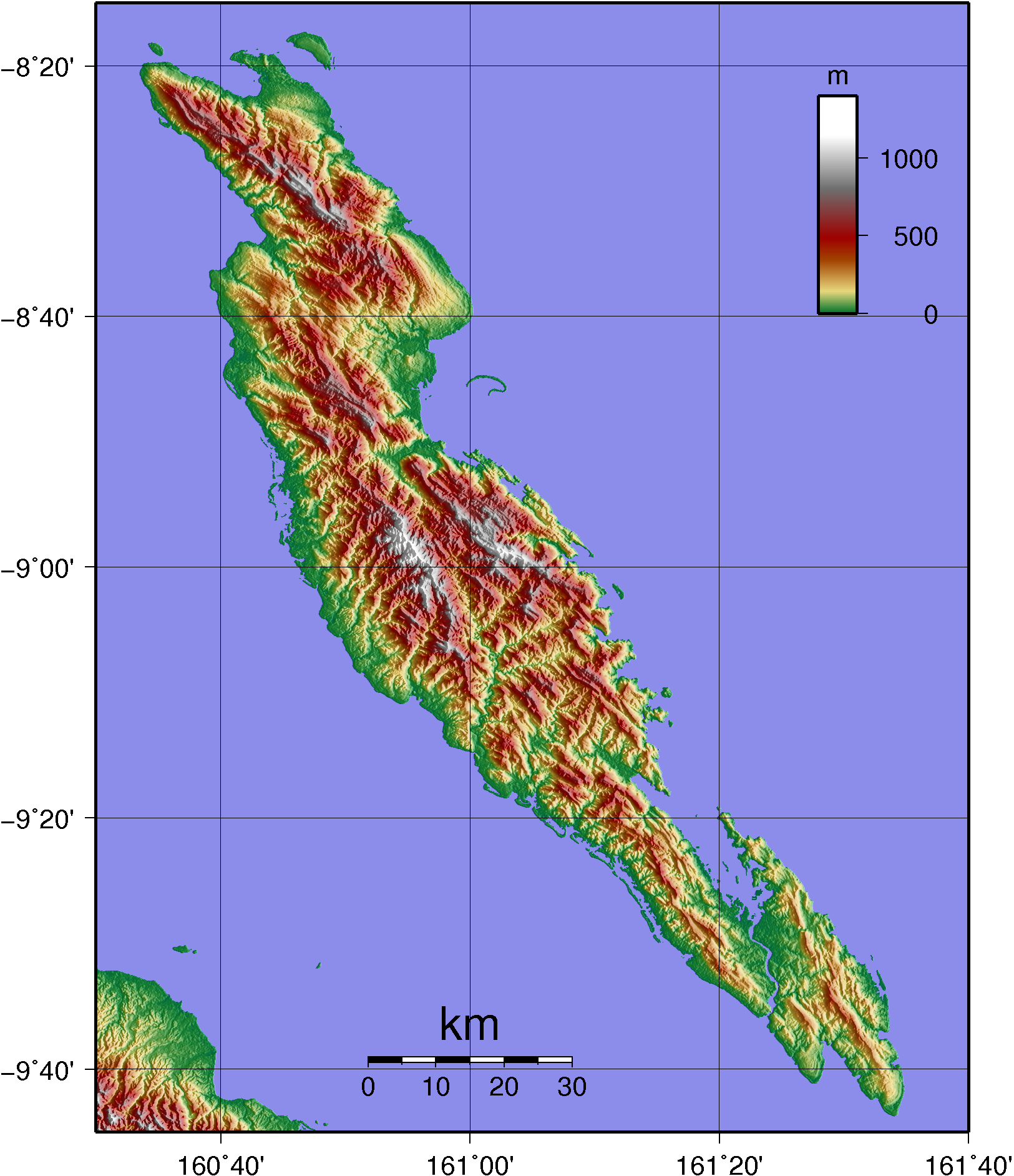
Maana'omba is located off the northeast coast of Malaita Island

Maana'omba is an island in Malaita Province, in Solomon Islands.
