= Malaita Province =

Province of Solomon Islands

Malaita Province Malaita Provins (Pijin)
- Province
- Flag

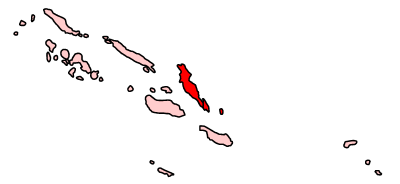
- Coordinates: 9°0′S 161°0′E
- Country: Solomon Islands
- Capital: Auki

Government
  - Premier: Hon. Elijah Asilaua

Area
  - Total: 4,225 km^{2} (1,631 sq mi)

Population (2019 census)
  - Total: 172,740
  - Density: 40.89/km^{2} (105.9/sq mi)
- Time zone: UTC+11:00 (+11:00)
- ISO 3166 code: SB-ML

Malaita Province is the most populous of the nine provinces of Solomon Islands. The population of the province is 172,740 as of 2019. The area of the province is 4,225 km^{2} (1,631 sq mi).

It is named after its largest island, Malaita (also known as "Big Malaita" or "Maramapaina"). Other islands include South Malaita Island (also called "Small Malaita" or "Maramasike"), Sikaiana Island, and Ontong Java Atoll. Britain defined its area of interest in the Solomons, including Malaita, and central government control of Malaita began in 1893, when Captain Gibson R.N., of HMS Curacoa, declared the southern Solomon Islands as a British Protectorate with the proclamation of the British Solomon Islands Protectorate.

The provincial capital and largest urban center is Auki, which was established as the Administrative center for Malaita Province in 1909. Tourism is largely underdeveloped in Malaita; Auki is near to the Langa Langa Lagoon, which provides opportunities for snorkeling, and the villagers provide shell making demonstrations.

The Melanesian population of Malaita has unique cultural traditions in social aspects of life. Brideprice is a tradition which is unique to Malaita compared to the other islands of the Solomon Islands. In this practice the groom's parents present customary money of shells and food to the bride's parents.

== Ethnicity ==
The people of the main island are of Melanesian ethnicity. The outer islands of Ontong Java and Sikaiana are of a Polynesian ethnicity and are recognised as Polynesian outliers of Polynesian culture.

== Traditional practices ==
Malaitan shell-money, manufactured in the Langa Langa Lagoon, is the traditional currency used in Malaita and throughout the Solomon Islands. The money consists of small polished shell disks which are drilled and placed on strings. It can be used as payment for bride price, funeral feasts and compensation, with the shell-money having a cash equivalent value. It is also worn as an adornment and status symbol. The standard unit, known as the tafuliae, is several strands 1.5 m in length. The shell money is still produced by the people of Langa Langa Lagoon, but much is inherited, from father to son, and the old traditional strings are now rare.

The violation of cultural taboos and practices as well as causing personal offence is considered a cultural affront. Malaita culture calls for the exchange of valuables to ease and resolve the alienation that may thus arise. This is called fa abua or fa okae (compensation).

== Reef Islands ==
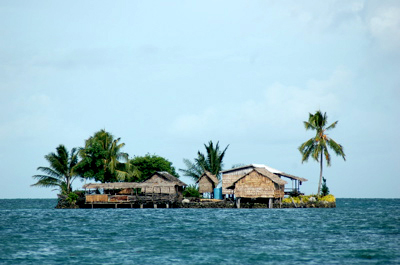
Offshore islands

The people of Langa Langa Lagoon and Lau Lagoon in Malaita, Solomon Islands built about 60 artificial islands on the reef including Funaafou, Foueda, Sulufou, Saua, Ferasubua and Adagege.

The inhabitants of these lagoons call themselves wane i asi 'sea people' as distinct from wane i tolo 'inland people' who live in the interior of the island. There was a history of conflict between the bush people and the salt-water people. The people of Lau Lagoon build islands on the reef as these provided protection against attack. These islands were formed literally one rock at a time. A family would take their canoe out to the reef which protects the lagoon and then dive for rocks, bring them to the surface and then return to the selected site and drop the rocks into the water. Living on the reef was also healthier as the mosquitoes, which infested the coastal swamps, were not found on the reef islands. The Lau people continue to live on the reef islands.

== Administrative divisions ==
Malaita Province is sub-divided into the following constituencies (or electoral districts), which are further sub-divided into wards (with populations at the 2009 and 2019 Censuses respectively):

Name		Population (2009 census)			Population (2019 census)		
Name		Total	Male	Female	Total	Male	Female
16. – North Malaita		12,625	6,350	6,275	15,823	7,983	7,840
16.07.	Fo'ondo/Gwaiau	5,532	2,779	2,753	6,588	3,336	3,252
16.08.	Malu'u	4,333	2,180	2,153	5,672	2,820	2,852
16.09.	Matakwalao	2,760	1,391	1,369	3,563	1,827	1,736
17. – Lau/Mbaelela		14,704	7,314	7,390	18,766	9,310	9,456
17.06.	Mandalua/Folotana	2,749	1,383	1,366	3,940	1,965	1,975
17.10.	Takwa	10,070	5,002	5,068	12,445	6,164	6,281
17.12.	Fouenda	1,885	929	956	2,381	1,181	1,200
18. – Baegu/Asifola		5,647	2,790	2,857	9,531	4,697	4,834
18.11.	East Baegu	4,781	2,370	2,411	6,784	3,344	3,440
18.13.	Sulufou/Kwarande	866	420	446	2,747	1,353	1,394
19. – Fataleka		7,571	3,851	3,720	10,670	5,315	5,355
19.05.	West Baegu/Fataleka	2,477	1,270	1,207	6,220	3,075	3,145
19.14.	Sububenu/Burianiasi	5,094	2,581	2,513	4,450	2,240	2,210
20. – West Kwara'ae		15,053	7,675	7,378	18,048	9,226	8,822
20.03.	Buma	6,223	3,275	2,948	8,122	4,191	3,931
20.04.	Fauabu	8,830	4,400	4,430	9,926	5,035	4,891
21. – Central Kwara'ae		17,273	8,773	8,500	20,355	10,408	9,947
21.02.	Aimela	7,639	3,889	3,750	8,730	4,469	4,265
21.29.	Keaimela/Radefasu	9,634	4,884	4,750	11,621	5,939	5,682
22. – East Malaita		7,787	3,921	3,866	8,293	4,184	4,109
22.15.	Nafinua	4,195	2,125	2,070	4,593	2,322	2,271
22.16.	Faumamanu/Kwai	3,592	1,796	1,796	3,700	1,862	1,838
23. – Aoke/Langa Langa		7,027	3,516	3,511	10,133	5,015	5,118
23.01.	Auki	5,105	2,592	2,513	7,020	3,535	3,485
23.30.	Langalanga	1,922	924	998	3,113	1,480	1,633
24. – East Kwaio		9,509	4,720	4,789	12,291	6,131	6,161
24.17.	Gulalofou	6,031	2,995	3,036	8,609	4,316	4,293
24.18.	Waneagu/Taelanasina	3,478	1,725	1,753	3,682	1,814	1,868
25. – West Kwaio		10,789	5,488	5,301	13,112	6,639	6,473
25.26.	Kwarekwareo	1,921	961	960	2,785	1,394	1,391
25.27.	Siesie	3,747	1,883	1,864	4,508	2,296	2,212
25.28.	Waneagu Silana Sina	5,121	2,644	2,477	5,819	2,949	2,870
26. – East Are Are		7,099	3,567	3,532	8,199	4,042	4,157
26.19.	Aiaisi	3,574	1,815	1,759	4,190	2,063	2,127
26.20.	Areare	3,525	1,752	1,773	4,009	1,979	2,030
27. – West Are Are		7,200	3,621	3,579	8,008	4,047	3,961
27.24.	Mareho	2,550	1,237	1,313	2,820	1,407	1,413
27.25.	Tai	4,650	2,384	2,266	5,188	2,640	2,548
28. – Small Malaita		12,967	6,484	6,483	16,146	8,026	8,120
28.21.	Raroisu'u	4,988	2,460	2,528	6,049	3,034	3,015
28.22.	Aba/Asimeuru	4,936	2,438	2,498	5,929	2,885	3,044
28.23.	Asimae	3,043	1,586	1,457	4,168	2,108	2,061
29. – Malaita Outer Islands		2,345	1,162	1,183	3,365	1,669	1,696
29.31.	Luaniua	1,396	697	699	1,965	993	972
29.32.	Pelau	700	343	357	1,041	493	548
29.33.	Sikaiana	249	122	127	351	183	176
Total		137,596	69,232	68,364	172,740	86,691	86,049

== Islands ==
- Adagege
- Alite
- Anuta Paina
- Faore
- Ferasubua
- Foueda
- Funaafou
- Laulasi
- Maana'omba
- Malaita
- Matuavi
- Maramasike (South Malaita)
- Mbasakana
- Ndai
- Ontong Java
- Saua
- Sikaiana
- Sulufou
- Tehaolei

== Notes ==
=== References ===
- Roger Keesing, Kwaio Religion: The Living and the Dead in a Solomon Island Society. New York: Columbia University Press, 1982.
- Roger M. Keesing and Peter Corris. Lightning Meets the West Wind: The Malaita Massacre. Melbourne: Oxford University Press, 1980.
- Janet Kent. The Solomon Islands. Harrisburg, PA: Stackpole Books, 1972.
- James Page, 'Education and Acculturation on Malaita: An Ethnography of Intraethnic and Interethnic Affinities'.The Journal of Intercultural Studies. 1988. #15/16:74-81; available on-line at http://eprints.qut.edu.au/archive/00003566/.
- Ples Blong Iumi: Solomon Islands: The Past Four Thousand Years. Honiara: University of the South Pacific, 1989.
- Harold M. Ross. Baegu: Social and Ecological Organization in Malaita, Solomon Islands. Chicago: University of Illinois Press, 1973.
