= Sikaiana =

Atoll in eastern Solomon Islands

Sikiana atoll
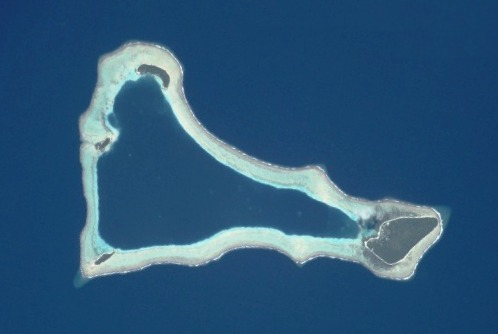
- NASA picture of Sikaiana Atoll

- Location within Solomon Islands

Geography
- Location: Pacific Ocean
- Archipelago: Solomon Islands
- Area: 2 km^{2} (0.77 sq mi)

Administration
- Solomon Islands
- Province: Malaita

Demographics
- Population: 249 (2009)

Sikaiana (formerly called the Stewart Islands) is a small atoll 212 kilometres (132 miles) NE of Malaita in Solomon Islands in the south Pacific Ocean. It is almost 14 kilometres (8.7 miles) in length and its lagoon, known as Te Moana, is totally enclosed by the coral reef. Its total land surface is only 2 square kilometres (0.77 square miles). There is no safe anchorage close to this atoll, which makes it often inaccessible to outsiders.

== Geography ==
Sikaiana is a remote tropical coral atoll located at latitude and longitude 8°25′0″S 162°52′0″E, over 200 kilometres (125 miles) from any other islands. The main island at Sikaiana atoll, located at the easternmost corner, is called Sikaiana. The three small islands in the west of the atoll are Tehaolei (north), Matuiloto (west), and Matuavi (south). There are also two artificial islands on the reef, Te Palena and Hakatai'atata.

== History ==
Administratively, Sikaiana is governed as an outlying region of Malaita Province in Solomon Islands. Sikaiana's population is approximately 300 people of Polynesian descent—not of the Melanesian descent prevalent in the main Solomon Islands. It is considered by anthropologists to be a Polynesian outlier.

A 1998 GAO report stated:

Some residents of the Stewart Islands in the Solomon Islands group ... claim that they are native Hawaiians and U.S. citizens.... They base their claim on the assertion that the Stewart Islands were ceded to King Kamehameha IV and accepted by him as part of the Kingdom of Hawaii in 1856 and, thus, were part of the Republic of Hawaii (which was declared in 1893) when it was annexed to the United States by law in 1898. The 1898 law identifies the islands being annexed only as the "Hawaiian Islands and their dependencies". However, the annexation was based on the report of the Hawaiian Commission which did not include the Stewart Islands among the islands it identified as part of the Republic of Hawaii. Report of the Hawaiian Commission, S. Doc. No. 16, 55th Cong., at 4 (3d Sess. 1898). In 1996, some Stewart Islands residents applied to register to vote in a plebiscite limited to Native Hawaiians. Their requests for ballots, however, were rejected by the Hawaiian Sovereignty Election Council.

Location of Sikaiana Atoll in the Pacific Ocean

In 1893, the United Kingdom established the British Solomon Islands Protectorate over most of what is now Solomon Islands excluding Sikaiana. This was done to further British colonial interests in the region and to regulate the practice of "blackbirding", the labour recruitment of Solomon Islanders to work on labour plantations in the then-colony of Queensland, later the state of Queensland. On 21 June 1897 this protectorate was extended to include Sikaiana, Rennell, and Bellona Islands.

Sikaiana is part of the Anglican Church of Melanesia Diocese of Southern Malaita and Sikaiana, and the majority of its inhabitants are Anglicans.

== See also ==
- Sikaiana language
- Polynesian outlier

== Notes and references ==
=== References ===
- Portions of the Book of Common Prayer in Sikaiana, 1932 Anglican liturgical document in Sikaiana.
