= Ndai =

Island in Solomon Islands

Coordinates: 7°54′S 160°37′E

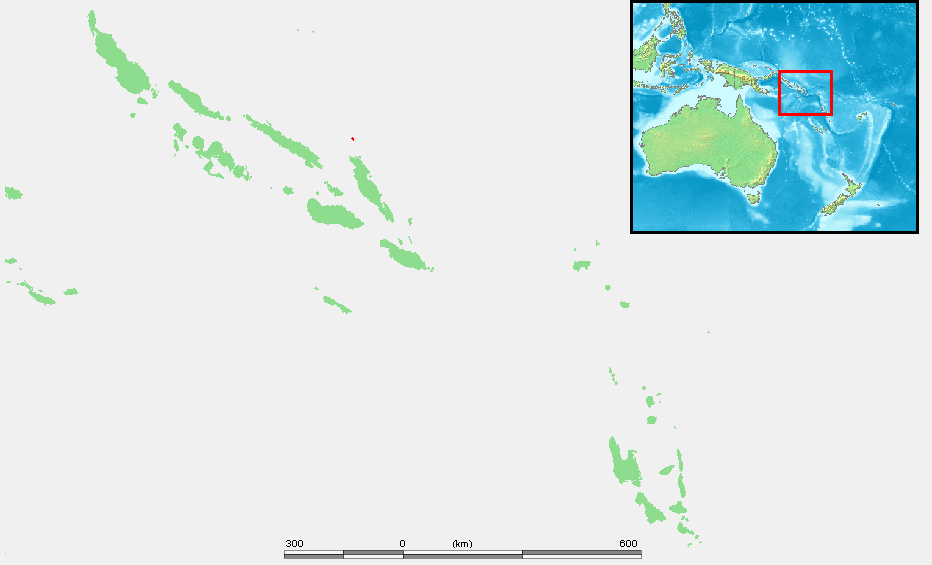

Geography
- Location: South Pacific Ocean
- Archipelago: Solomon Islands

Administration
- Solomon Islands
- Province: Malaita

Ndai (local spelling Dai), formerly known as Gower Island (and sometimes Inattendue Island), is an island in Malaita Province, Solomon Islands. It is located to the north of Malaita Island.
