= Alite Island =

Island of Solomon Islands

Coordinates: 8°54′S 160°44′E

Geography
- Location: South Pacific Ocean
- Archipelago: Solomon Islands

Administration
- Solomon Islands
- Province: Malaita

Alite Island is an island in Malaita Province, Solomon Islands. It is located off the west coast of Malaita Island. The estimated terrain elevation above sea level is 6 metres.
