= Binu =

Given name

Binu is a common given name for boys in Kerala state in southwestern India. The name was popular in the 1970s. Binu is a variant of the Hebrew name Ben (בן) and sometimes also a short form of Binyamin (son of righteousness/son of right hand) a Hebrew origin name. It is particularly popular among the Saint Thomas Syrian Christian (Nazrani) community from Kerala referring to the descendants of the 1st century Judeo-Christians converted from Judaism who practiced and even today practices endogamy. The Latin name Benjamin is derived from Binyamin.

People in Kerala are often known by their first name alone. That was the practice in most of southern India. First names were usually long and religious. Most had a popular short name derived from the first name. Names in Kerala underwent a revolution in Kerala during the 60s and 1970s. Many parents wanted their children to have religious-neutral popular short names in a state with many religions practiced in harmony. Most parents were educated in English by that time so they invented names with two sounds in Malayalam starting with English alphabets. Anu, Binu, Cinu, Dinu, Finu, Ginu, Jinu, Linu, Minu, Rinu, Sinu, Tinu, Vinu, Winu, Zinu were common names given to children in Kerala of all religions and no-religion during that time. The missing alphabets I, K, N, O, P, Q, X, Y in the list did not make it, as they did not rhyme in Malayalam. Many of the people with first name "Binu", got their name in this period for this reason as well. Hindus, Muslims, Christians and the nonreligious have the first name Binu. Kerala also started a practice of using the first name of the head of the household as the last name of the spouse and children, as the use of last name was not very common then. The last name "Binu" thus started appearing in Kerala in the 1980s.

Binu is also the name of a social application, that can be used to read news, books etc. This application can be used for free when using certain mobile networks like Econet Zimbabwe.

== Binyamin ==
In Kerala one of the entombed bishops in Manjanikkara is Binyamin. He came from Syria and died in service in Manjanikkara in the 16th century. Several of the Syrian Christian/Syrian Malabar Nasrani parents name their boys after him with names such as "Binu", "Benny", Benoy, Binoy (Ben-oni original name of Binyamin). Binyamin is pronounced as in "Be-new-min" in Hebrew and Syriac. The real pronunciation is "Benew", but in Malayalam, it is commonly pronounced as in "Beenoo", with short vowel sounds.

Binyam is the Ethiopian version of Binyamin Appelbaum, a reporter for The New York Times.

== Meanings ==
Bin means 'son of ' in Arabic, Hebrew, Aramaic, semitic languages.
