= Auki =

Auki ʻAoke
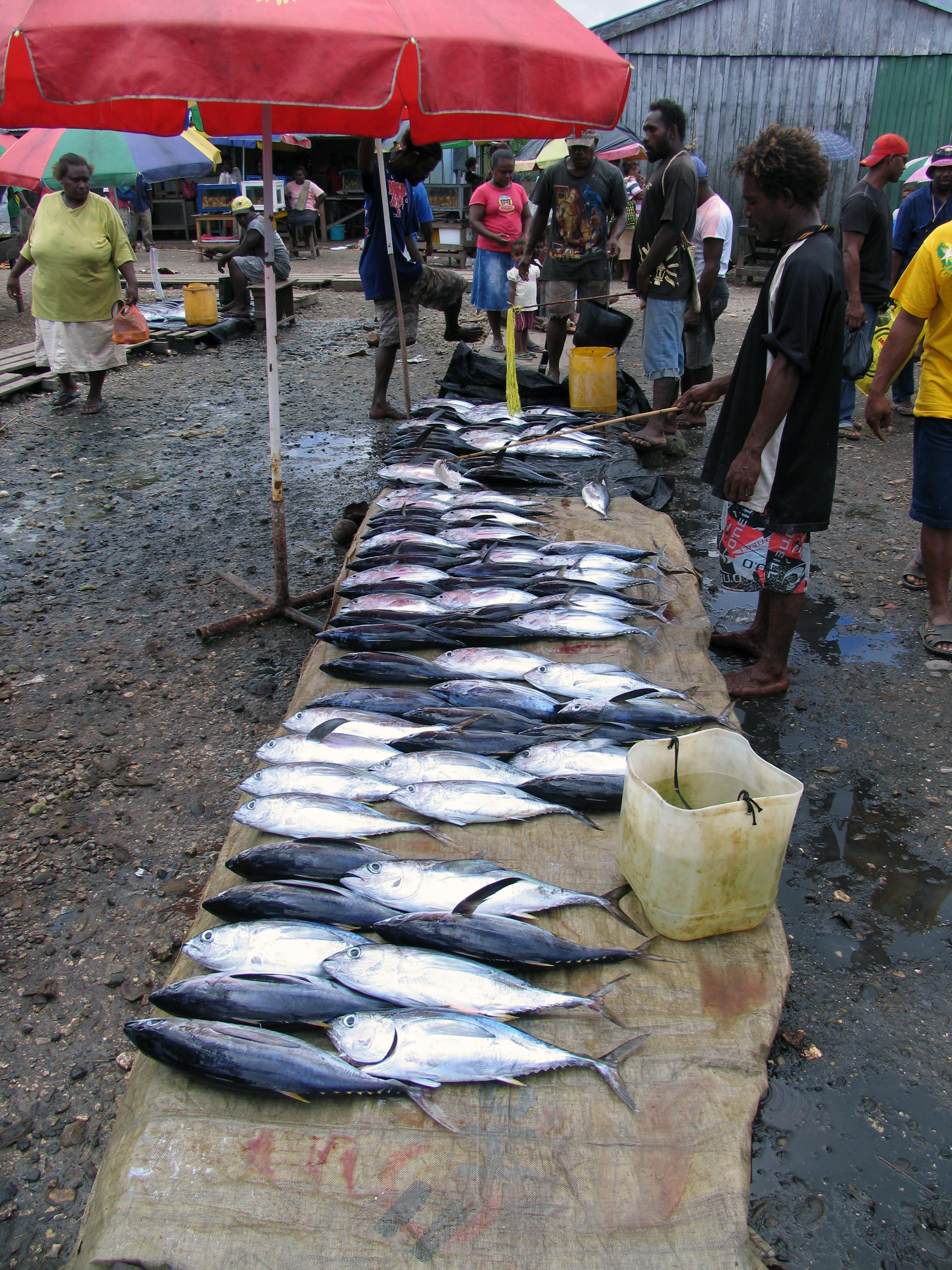
- Fish for sale in the Auki market

- Location in the Solomon Islands
- Coordinates: 8°46′06″S 160°41′49″E
- Country: Solomon Islands
- Province: Malaita Province
- Island: Malaita Island
- Elevation: 157 m (515 ft)

Population (2019)
  - Total: 7,020
- Time zone: UTC+11 (UTC)
- Climate: Af

Auki, sometimes styled ʻAoke, is the provincial capital of Malaita Province in Solomon Islands. It is situated on the northern end of Langa Langa Lagoon on the north-west coast of Malaita. It is one of the largest provincial towns in Solomon Islands, being the third largest town in the country behind the Honiara Urban Area and Noro. The town had a population of 7,020 in 2019. It was established as the administrative center for Malaita Province in 1909.

== Overview ==
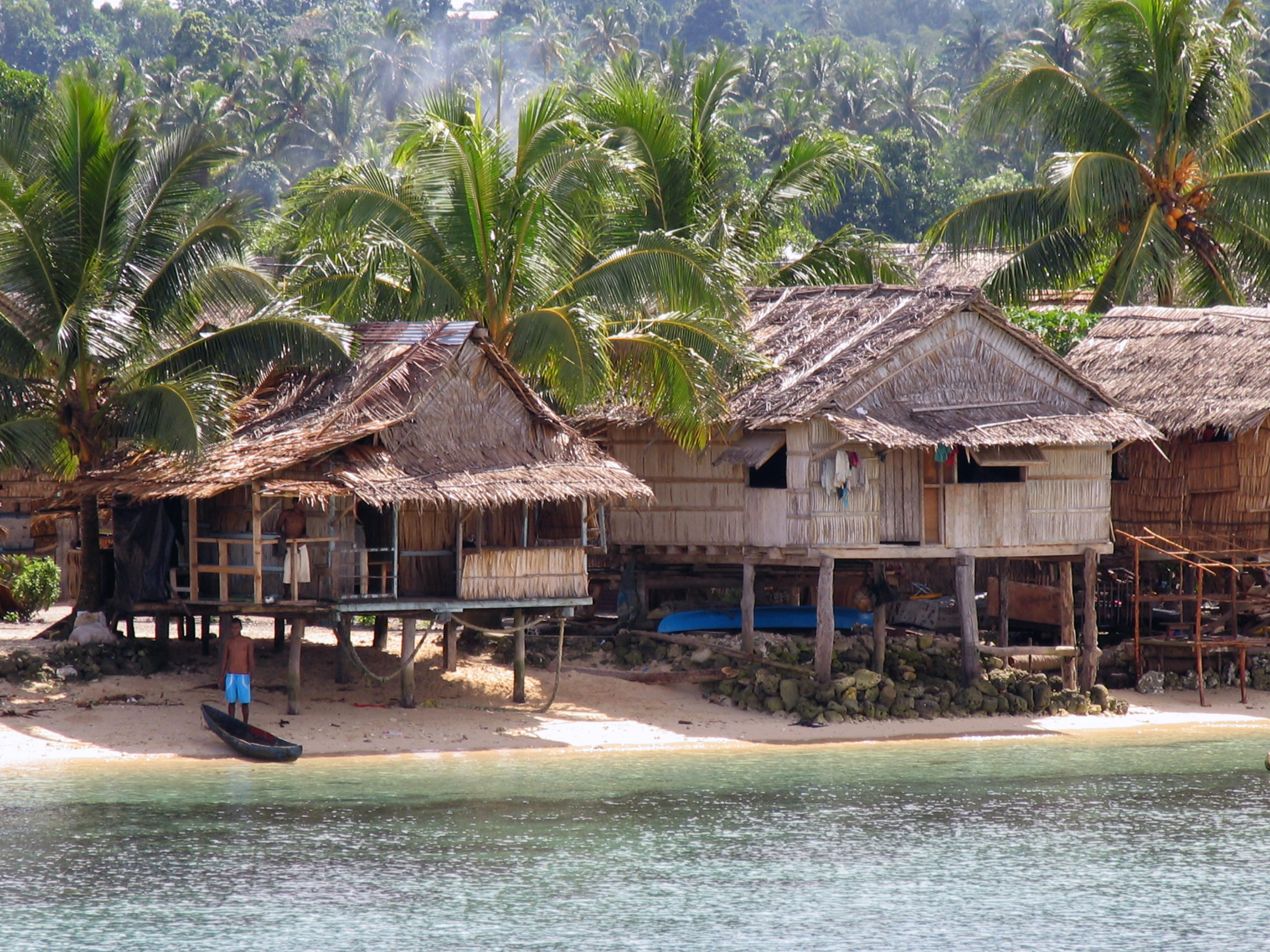
Typical houses near Auki

There are daily flights between the Solomon's capital of Honiara (on Guadalcanal Island) and Auki. There are also regular shipping services between Honiara and Auki. The area is rich in culture and has become a central hub for many Malaitans who use the area to conduct a majority of trade and business in the province.

The town has electricity and the road is paved to the airport (approx. 11 km). The town has fruit, vegetables and fresh fish sold daily in the newly build market (built by Japanese Aid) located on the waterfront. Tourism is largely underdeveloped in Auki; it is immediately to the north of Langa Langa Lagoon, which provides opportunities for snorkeling, and the villagers provide shell making demonstrations.

The newly elected Member of Parliament in the 2010 elections for Auki-Langalanga constituency is Matthew Cooper Wale who was the former Minister of Education and Human Resources Development in the last government and is currently the Deputy Leader of Opposition. The fifth Anglican Bishop of Malaita, The Right Reverend Sam Sahu is based at the Diocesan office in Auki. He administers Malaita's 42 parishes from Auki.

Correctional Services of Solomon Islands operates the Auki Correctional Centre in Auki.

== Climate ==
Climate data for Auki (1962–1990)
| Month | Jan | Feb | Mar | Apr | May | Jun | Jul | Aug | Sep | Oct | Nov | Dec | Year |
|---|---|---|---|---|---|---|---|---|---|---|---|---|---|
| Mean daily maximum °C (°F) | 30.6 (87.1) | 30.4 (86.7) | 30.4 (86.7) | 30.3 (86.5) | 30.2 (86.4) | 29.9 (85.8) | 29.3 (84.7) | 29.4 (84.9) | 29.6 (85.3) | 30.1 (86.2) | 30.5 (86.9) | 30.7 (87.3) | 30.1 (86.2) |
| Mean daily minimum °C (°F) | 23.8 (74.8) | 23.8 (74.8) | 23.6 (74.5) | 23.5 (74.3) | 23.2 (73.8) | 22.9 (73.2) | 22.5 (72.5) | 22.3 (72.1) | 22.6 (72.7) | 22.8 (73.0) | 23.2 (73.8) | 23.6 (74.5) | 23.2 (73.7) |
| Average rainfall mm (inches) | 397.0 (15.63) | 385.0 (15.16) | 428.0 (16.85) | 257.0 (10.12) | 223.0 (8.78) | 178.0 (7.01) | 239.0 (9.41) | 227.0 (8.94) | 212.0 (8.35) | 227.0 (8.94) | 224.0 (8.82) | 293.0 (11.54) | 3,290 (129.55) |
| Average rainy days (≥ 1 mm) | 21.0 | 22.0 | 23.0 | 21.0 | 19.0 | 22.0 | 20.0 | 17.0 | 19.0 | 19.0 | 18.0 | 19.0 | 240 |
Source: World Meteorological Organization
