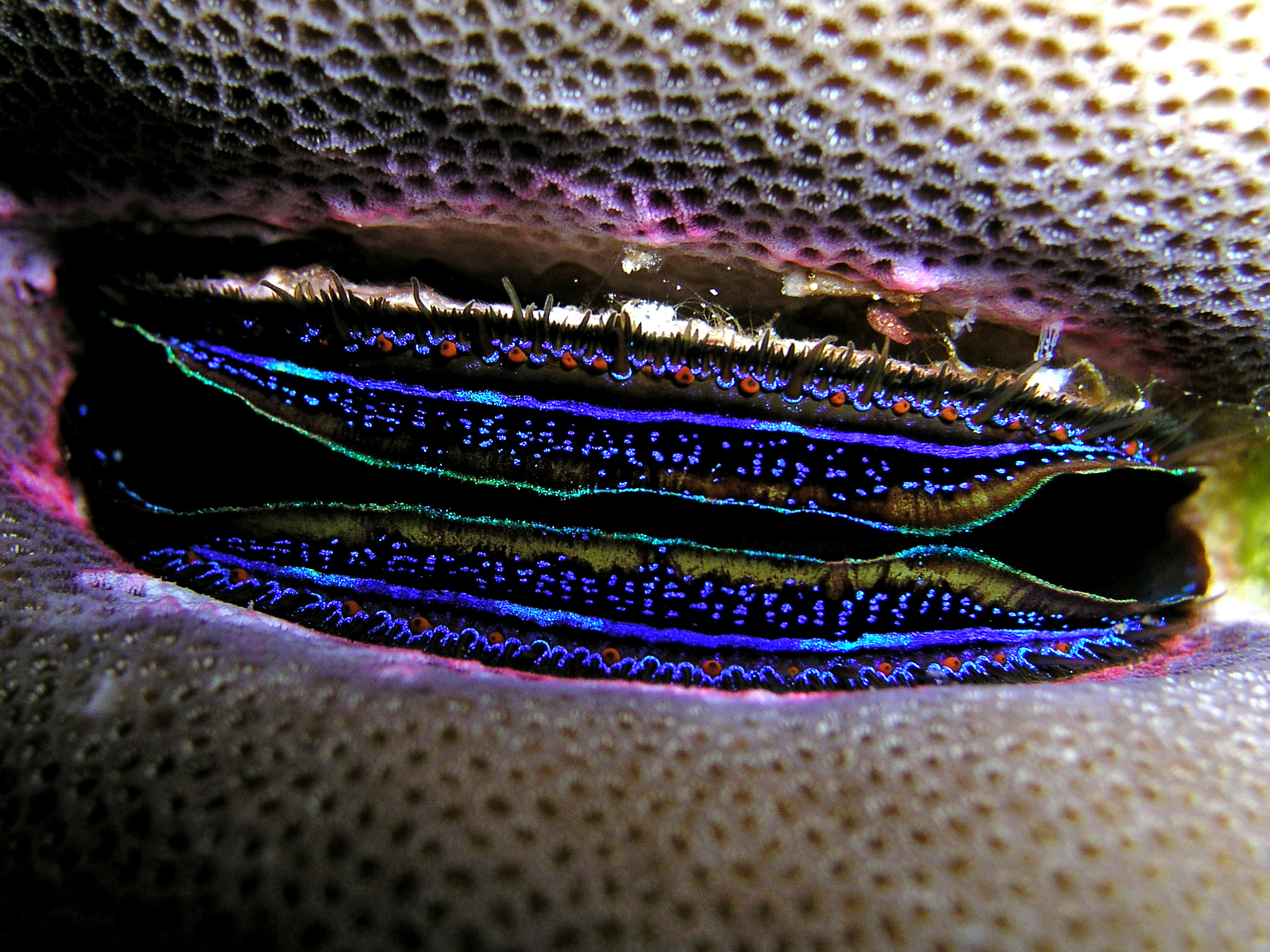

Scientific classification
- Kingdom: Animalia
- Phylum: Mollusca
- Class: Bivalvia
- Order: Pectinida
- Family: Pectinidae
- Subfamily: Pedinae
- Tribe: Pedini; Bronn, 1862
- Genus: Pedum; Bruguière, 1792
- Species: P. spondyloideum

Binomial name
- Pedum spondyloideum (Gmelin, 1791)

Synonyms
- Hinnitinae Habe, 1977; Peduminae T. Habe, 1977; Species synonymy List: Ostrea pedum, Röding, 1798; Ostrea spondyloidea, Gmelin, 1791; Pedum pedum; Pedum pedum intensum, Iredale, 1939

= Pedum spondyloideum =

Species of bivalve

Pedum is a monotypic genus of bivalves belonging to the family Pectinidae, the scallops. The only species is Pedum spondyloideum and it is the only genus in the tribe Pedini. Sometimes referred to as the iridescent scallop, this species is found throughout the Indo-Pacific.

Among scallops, this species exhibits a unique lifestyle where they "bore" into live coral, creating a narrow "burrow" or niche that these scallops inhabit throughout their life.

== Description ==
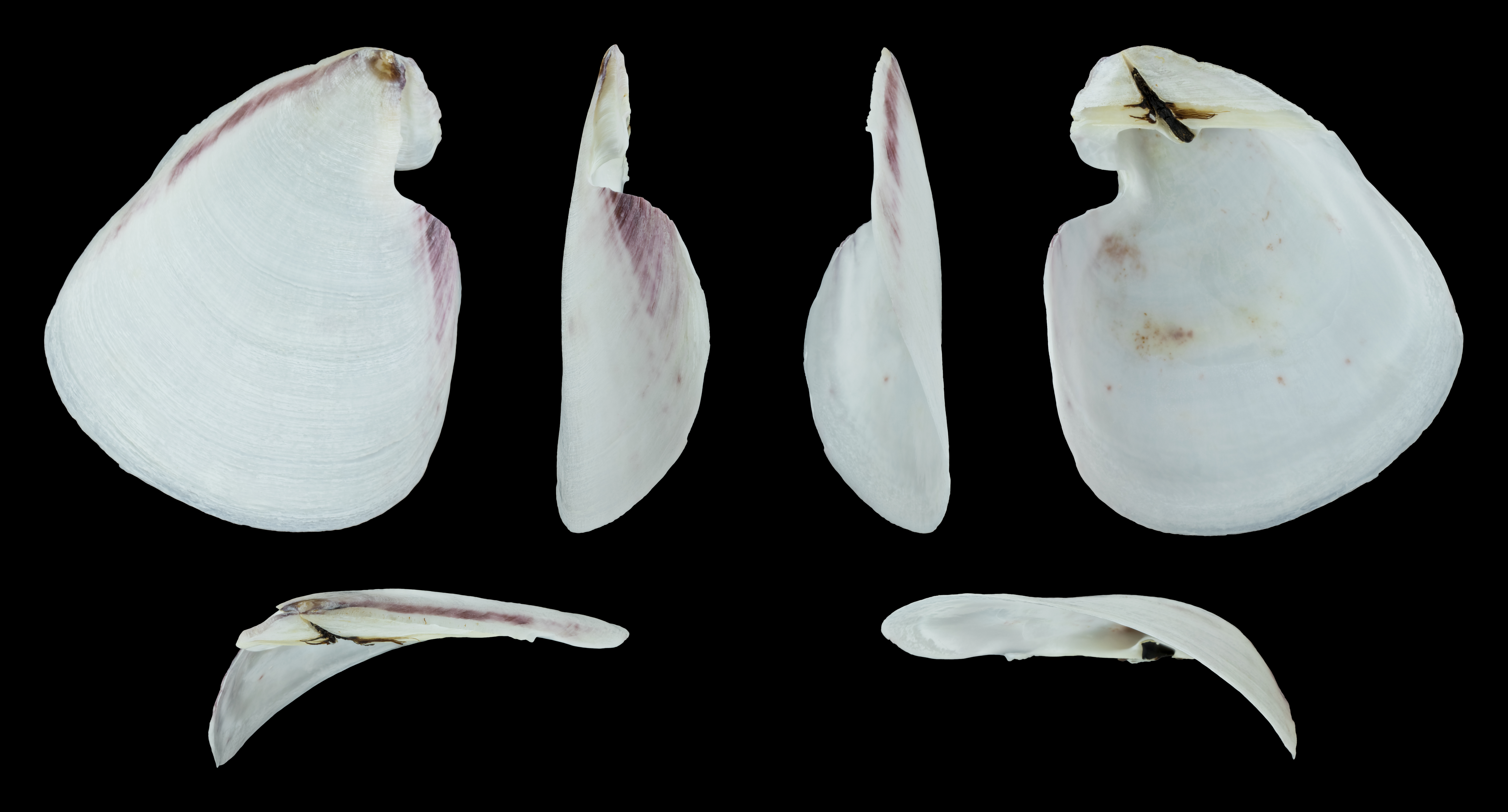
Right valve

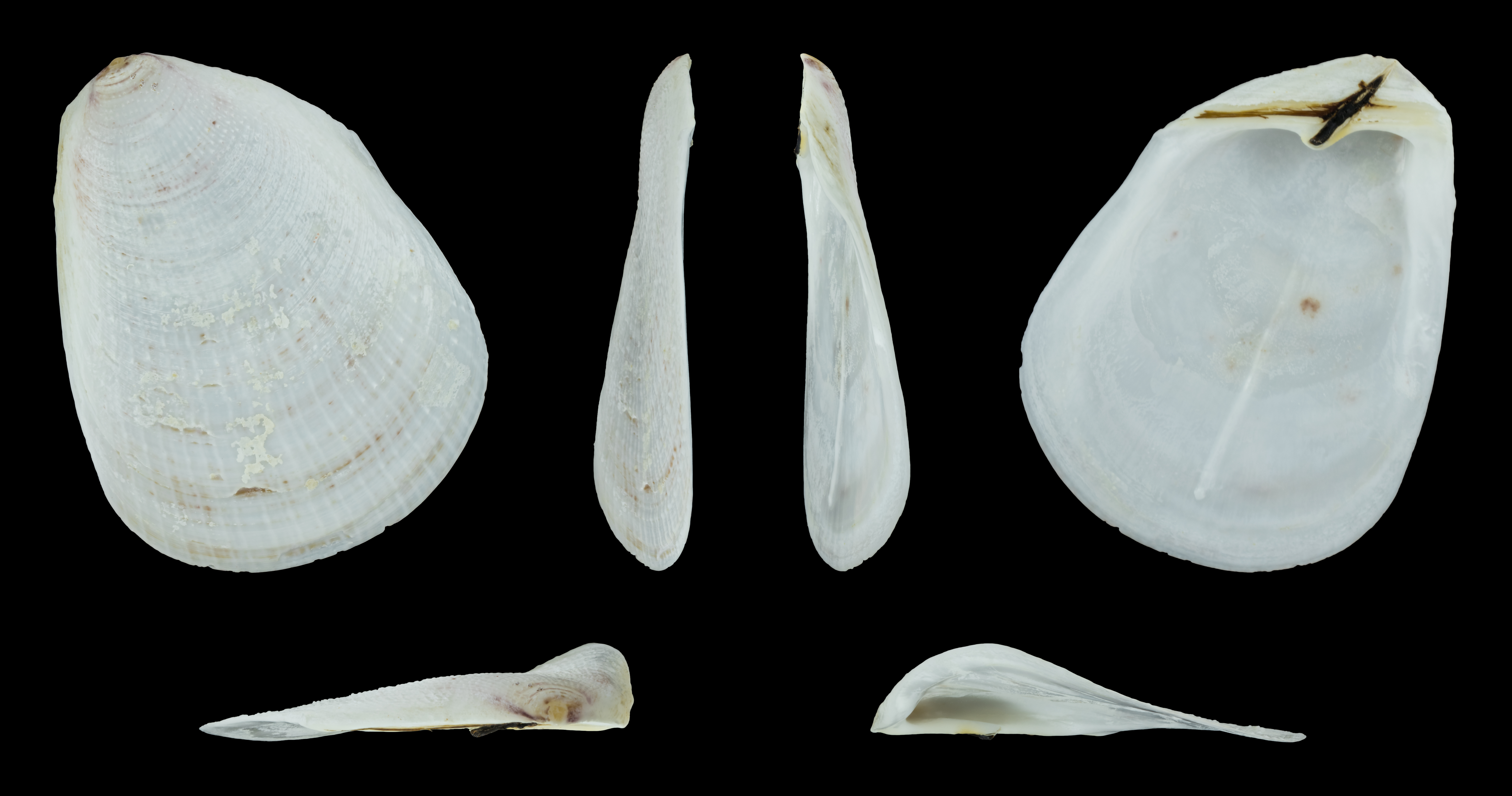
Left valve

The two shell valves of Pedum are fan-shaped and asymmetrical: the right valve has a deep byssal notch, is inflected, smoother, and is wider and larger than the left valve, which is flattened, possesses radial lines and spines.

The scallop's mantle folds and tentacles are part of its visible anatomy; two tentacle types have been observed: a wholly white tentacle and a brown-striped variety. Like other scallops, Pedum possesses eyes.

== Biology ==
Pedum occupies a unique niche among scallops; this species bores into living stony corals, burrowing into their skeleton, described as a "nestling" life habit. Phylogenetics suggests that this behavior arose from ancestors which used byssus to attach themselves to a substrate. At least one other species exhibits this life habit.

The following families were observed to host Pedum in Thailand's Andaman coast:

- Acroporidae
- Agariciidae
- Faviidae
- Siderastreidae
- Oculinidae
- Poritidae
- Milleporidae

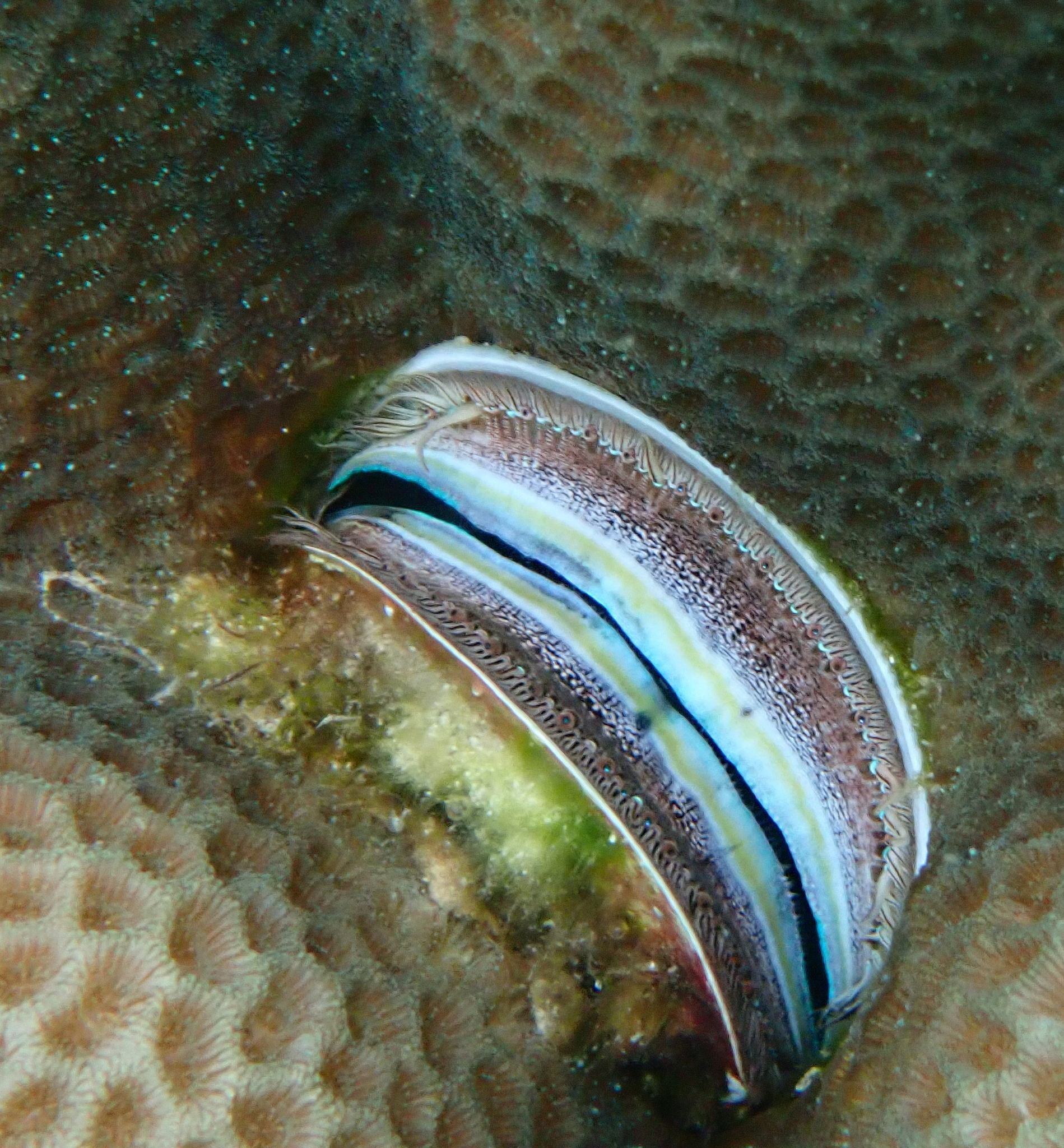
The rim of dead coral around this Pedum is evident

Depending on the shape of its host, Pedum may embed itself obliquely (in plate-shaped corals), or deeply (in massive corals).

To allow for the maintenance of its crevice, Pedum secretes a chemical that erodes the coral's skeleton and tissues, which has been compared to the distantly related Lithophaga mussels. Juveniles initially settle on the surface of a coral colony, slowly embedding itself and expanding its crevice; during this stage, Shell Width (SW) increases faster than Shell Height (SH). As it grows, the right valve firmly attaches to the crevice's walls, allowing the left valve to open and close. The scallop's growth keeps pace with its coral host's own growth rate. Additionally, the pallial tissues of the mantle along with the tentacles attack the coral's tissues immediately surrounding the crevice, which maintains the opening necessary for the scallop and prevents it from being entombed. This action leaves a "band" or rim surrounding the opening, which displays chemical etch marks when observed under a microscope. To retract, the scallop pulls their strand of byssus.

These scallops may benefit their hosts by hindering their predation by the crown-of-thorns starfish (Acanthaster spp.), which are repelled by jets of water from the scallops (these jets are typically used to expel pseudo-feces and sediment). Pedum-inhabited corals were left uneaten by the starfish, leaving a remnant region of live coral around the scallops.

This species does not seem to tolerate the adverse conditions of marine lakes, where mytilid bivalves and polychaete tube worms occupy its filter-feeding niche.

Examination of coral growth rings containing Pedum crevices suggest that the scallops may live for at least 6 years.
