= HMS Curacoa =

Four ships of the Royal Navy have been named HMS Curacoa, after the island in the Caribbean Sea more usually spelled Curaçao:

- HMS Curacoa (1809), a 36-gun fifth rate launched in 1809. She was reduced to 24 guns in 1831 and broken up in 1849.
- HMS Curacoa (1854), a wood screw frigate launched in 1854. She was flagship of the Australia Station during the New Zealand Wars and was broken up in 1869.
- HMS Curacoa (1878), a screw corvette launched in 1878 and sold in 1904.
- HMS Curacoa (D41), a C-class light cruiser launched in 1917 and accidentally sunk by RMS Queen Mary in 1942.
