= Keesing =

Keesing is a surname. Notable people with the surname include:

- Felix M. Keesing (1902–1961), anthropologist
- Henry Keesing (1791–1879), New Zealand shopkeeper and financier, also known as Hartog ben Tobias Keesing, Hartog Zwi Tobias Keesing, and Hartog Tobias Keesing
- Isaac Keesing (1886–1966), Dutch publisher of Keesing's Record of World Events (published 1931–2016, previously known as Keesing's Contemporary Archives)
- Nancy Keesing (1923–1993), Australian writer and editor
- Roger Keesing (1935–1993), anthropologist, son of Felix Keesing
