= Gerald Harrison =

English officer of the Royal Navy and first-class cricketer

Rear-Admiral Gerald Harrison
- Born: Gerald Cartmell Harrison; 8 October 1883; Congleton, Cheshire, England
- Died: 10 August 1943 (aged 59); Blyth, Nottinghamshire, England
- Military career
- Allegiance: United Kingdom
- Branch: Royal Navy; Royal Australian Navy
- Service years: 1898–1936
- Rank: Rear-Admiral
- Commands: HMS Kestrel; HMS Fawn; HMS Crane; HMS Cossack; HMS Manners; HMS Wallace; HMS Rocket; HMAS Adelaide; HMAS Brisbane; HMS Barham; HMS St Vincent
- Conflicts: World War I • Battle of Jutland; Malaita Punitive Expedition
- Awards: Order of the Redeemer
- Cricket career

Cricket information
- Batting: Right-handed

Domestic team information
- Years: Team
- 1905–1910: Devon
- 1914–1920: Hampshire
- 1919: Marylebone Cricket Club

Career statistics
Competition	First-class
Matches	33
Runs scored	1,401
Batting average	25.94
100s/50s	1/6
Top score	111
Catches/stumpings	12/–
- Source: Gerald Harrison at Cricinfo

Rear-Admiral Gerald Cartmell Harrison (8 October 1883 – 10 August 1943) was an English first-class cricketer and an officer in the Royal Navy. He served in the navy from 1898 to 1936, rising to the rank of rear admiral. In first-class cricket, he made 33 appearances and scored 1,400 runs.

== Naval career ==
The son of John Harrison, a merchant, Harrison was born in October 1883 in Congleton, Cheshire. He entered the Royal Navy on 15 May 1898, aged 14. He was made a midshipman on 15 December 1899, and was promoted to acting sub-lieutenant in December 1902. In June 1905 he was promoted to lieutenant, and on 19 July 1911 was appointed to command of the Brazen-class destroyer Kestrel, based at The Nore. From 1 April 1913 he commanded Fawn, part of the 6th Destroyer Flotilla based at Portsmouth. He was promoted to lieutenant-commander in June 1913, and on 29 August 1913 was appointed to command of the 6th Flotilla with Crane as flotilla leader.

Harrison served in the First World War, being appointed to command of Cossack on 29 July 1914, one day after the outbreak of hostilities. From 26 August 1915, he was appointed to command the M-class destroyer HMS Manners, which he commissioned, and as part of the 11th Destroyer Flotilla; the ship subsequently took part in the Battle of Jutland in May–June 1916. He was promoted to commander in January 1918. Following the end of the war, he was appointed to command the Thornycroft type destroyer leader HMS Wallace on 25 January 1919, and on 1 October 1919 was appointed to command of the R-class destroyer HMS Rocket, part of the Portsmouth Local Defence Flotilla. Harrison was promoted to captain in December 1924.

He was subsequently attached to the Royal Australian Navy, where he commanded both HMAS Adelaide and HMAS Brisbane. He commanded Adelaide during the 1927 Malaita Punitive Expedition, which sought to put down a rebellion led by the Kwaio leader Basiana in the British Solomon Islands. Harrison was the representative for the Commonwealth of Australia and New South Wales for the sesquicentennial celebration of Captain James Cook's Discovery of Hawaii, laying a commemorative wreath at Pearl Harbor on behalf of Sir Joseph Carruthers. He served as a Deputy Director of Naval Intelligence from April 1930 to April 1932.

Harrison returned to the Royal Navy later in 1932, taking part in the relief efforts following the Chalcidice earthquake in Greece in September 1932. In September of the following year, he was granted permission by the King to wear the insignia of Commander of the Order of the Redeemer that he had been awarded by the President of Greece, Alexandros Zaimis, in recognition of "valuable services rendered... on the occasion of the earthquake in Chalcidice". He was appointed commander of HMS Barham in December 1933. From April 1934 to September 1936 he served as commander of St Vincent, the Boys' Training Establishment at Gosport. On 4 January 1936 Harrison was promoted to the rank of rear admiral, and was placed on the Retired List the following day. He served again in the Second World War during which he died, as his death in 1943 aged 59 and his cremation at Sheffield Crematorium are commemorated by the Commonwealth War Graves Commission.

== Cricket career ==
Harrison began his cricket at minor counties level for Devon in the 1905 Minor Counties Championship against Cornwall. He played minor counties cricket for Devon from 1905 to 1910, making 27 appearances. He made his debut in first-class cricket in 1912, playing for the Royal Navy against the British Army cricket team at Lord's; he played in the same fixture the following season and in 1914. He played for Hampshire as an amateur in 1914, making nine appearances in the 1914 County Championship, alongside matches against Cambridge University and the Marylebone Cricket Club, prior to the outbreak of the First World War leading a six-year hiatus in first-class cricket. Harrison scored 504 runs at an average of 26.52 during the 1914 season, with a highest score of 91 not out.

Following the end of the war in November 1918, Harrison returned to play first-class cricket in 1919. His first post-war match came for the MCC against Yorkshire at Lord's. He returned to play for Hampshire in the 1919 County Championship, making six appearances, alongside a first-class match against the Australian Imperial Forces. For Hampshire against Gloucestershire he scored his only first-class century with a score of 111. Alongside playing for Hampshire in 1919, he made an additional appearance for the Royal Navy against the British Army, and played for a combined Army and Navy cricket team against a Demobilised Officers cricket team, and for the South of England against the Australian Imperial Forces. In 1920, he made three first-class appearances in services cricket, playing for the Royal Navy against Cambridge University and the British Army, in addition to playing for the Combined Services cricket team against the Gentlemen of England. Four further appearances for Hampshire came in the 1920 County Championship, which marked the end of his first-class career. In 22 first-class matches for Hampshire, he scored 991 runs at an average of 28.31.

With respect to the role of the Royal Navy in spreading cricket around the world, Harrison was of the opinion that it was a global pioneer of cricket.

== Personal life and death ==
Harrison married Katherine Robertson on 7 March 1918. He died suddenly at Spital House in Blyth, Nottinghamshire on 10 August 1943. A memorial plaque was later erected at St Ann's Church, HMNB Portsmouth, and reads:

In Memory of Rear Admiral Gerald Cartmell Harrison
Died 10th August 1943 in his 60th year
His ashes were cast upon the Solent from H.M. Minesweeper 205, 17th Sept 1943
Erected by his wife in loving remembrance.
