= List of massacres in the Solomon Islands =

The following is a list of massacres that have occurred in the Solomon Islands archipelago prior to the formation of the nation state of Solomon Islands (numbers may be approximate):

| Name | Date | Location | Deaths | Notes |
|---|---|---|---|---|
| Lavinia massacre | 1872 | Nggela Islands | 6 | Death of the crew of the trading schooner Lavinia while collecting bêche-de-mer. |
| Sandfly Passage incident | October 1880 | Nggela Islands | 4 | Death of Lieutenant Bower, commander of HMS Sandfly, and 3 crewmen. |
| Young Dick massacre | 20 May 1886 | Malaita | 12 | Death of about 6 crewman and 6 Malaitans on the schooner Young Dick while on a blackbirding voyage. |
| Albatros massacre | 10 August 1896 | Guadalcanal | 5 | Massacre of Heinrich Foullon von Norbeeck, geologist and director of the Imperial and Royal Geological Society of Vienna and 4 crewman of the Albatros, killed while climbing Mount Lammas. |
| Malaita massacre | October 3, 1927 October 12, 1927 | Malaita | 15 Europeans 40-200 Kwaio | Death of William R. Bell, the District Officer of Malaita, his assistant Lilley, and another thirteen of his deputies while collecting tax. About sixty people were shot in the punitive expedition; about 200 men were taken to jail in Tulagi, where 31 died of dysentery. 6 were hanged and 17 were sentenced to long prison terms. |

== Notes ==
Footnotes

References

- Roger Keesing and Peter Corris. Lightning Meets the West Wind: The Malaita Massacre. Melbourne: Oxford University Press, 1980.
- Swinden, G. The natives appear restless tonight; HMAS Adelaide and the punitive expedition to Malaita 1927 in Maritime power in the twentieth century: the Australian experience, D. Stevens, ed. Allen and Unwin, 1998, 54–67.
