= Ramo =

Warrior-leader in the Solomon Islands

A ramo (Kwaio: lamo) was a warrior-leader among certain tribes on Malaita in the Solomon Islands. A ramo was recognized when he had killed an adversary in personal combat, and established an intimidating reputation. This was also believed to represent ancestral support, and their supernatural abilities contributed to their reputation.

Modern Malaitans generalize that ramos were part of the leadership triumvirate for each clan, along with a priest and a feastgiver; in practice, sometimes a single person fulfilled more than one role, and not all clans had established ramos or feastgivers. In theory, ramos lead the group in war and blood feuding, avenging murder or a violation of the sex code for bounty. Their prestige and wealth depended on their ability to collect and redistribute blood money. A ramo usually had blood money offered against him, but he was able to successfully intimidate anyone from attempting to collect it. They may even kill their own relatives in order to collect money put up for their own death.

== History ==
The power of the ramo on Malaita enlarged during the decades of blackbirding, as firearms and steel tools (decreasing the time required for farmwork) appeared on the island. Noted ramos from this time, such as Harisimae of Waisisi, are still remembered. At the turn of the century, observers noted that rifles were so common on Malaita that nearly every man carried one. This may have been an exaggeration, and they were largely outmoded guns and there were dwindling amounts of ammunition, but the rifles remained a powerful symbol of power and authority.

In the early decades of the twentieth century, Kwaio society was dominated by a half-dozen famous ramo and their assistants. One of the first goals during the pacification of Malaita as part of the British Solomon Islands Protectorate was to decrease the extent of the blood feuding and limit the autonomy of the ramos. William R. Bell, who was District Officer during the last part of this period, was viewed as a ramo when he attempted to stop the blood feuding. His confrontation with one of the most feared ramos of the time, Basiana, led to his death and the Malaita massacre.
