= Basiana =

Solomon native leader

Basiana (early 1880s – June 19, 1928) was a native leader of the Kwaio group on Malaita in the Solomon Islands. He was a powerful and feared ramo (bounty hunter), and came from a line of prominent leaders, feastgivers, and warriors of the Gounaile clan. He is known in the West as the killer of William R. Bell, the colonial District Officer, for which he and his co-conspirators were hanged.

== Biography ==
He was the only son and the eldest of his first cousins, so he was groomed for this position from an early age. Unlike many members of his clan, he did not go to Queensland or Fiji to work. As an adult, he became one of the most feared ramo of the time, and was remembered as being able to kill with ruthlessness and fearlessness that intimidated those around him. He is also remembered for his obsession with honour and strict enforcement of Kwaio norms. Basiana's success gave great quantities of wealth to his clan from his collection of blood money, which in turn contributed to the prestige of the clan as they offered feasts.

In the 1920s, Basiana and the other strongmen saw their power slipping under the new colonial regime, which was making inroads into Malaita led by the Malaita District Officer Bell. They saw the threat of the Protectorate justice, as some Kwaio had been hanged in Tulagi for the sort of killing that they did. Furthermore, they resented the imposition of a head tax on all Malaitans, and the efforts of the colonial authorities to confiscate their rifles. Finally, they resented the increased power of the newly commissioned constables, who were given power by the colonial authorities.

In 1927, Basiana and two other ramo planned an attack on Bell as he made his annual tax collection rounds. Others, aware of the strength of Europeans from their experience abroad or afraid from premonitions in a dream, tried to discourage the attack, but Basiana dismissed their concerns and was able to coerce others into following him. On October 4, Basiana paid his tax, withdrew, and then reappeared at the front of the queue and plunged his rifle into Bell's head with such strength his head virtually exploded. Other members of the party attacked, and most of the tax collection party were killed.

In retaliation for this killing, the colonial authorities launched a punitive expedition to root out the plotters of the attack and bring them to justice. Basiana, as the most wanted man, kept on the move and was able to evade the search parties. But later he surrendered, as he received news about the extent of the damage of the punitive expedition. Along with 200 other detainees, he was held in facilities in Tulagi for several months, awaiting trial. Along with five others he was convicted of murder and sentenced to be hanged. He was hanged publicly on June 19, with his two sons watching.

Basiana's eldest son Anifelo, raised to be a ramo as well, went on to become a police drummer, evangelist, and anticolonial political leader. He had one other son and one daughter.

== See also ==
- Malaita massacre

== General references ==
- Roger M. Keesing and Peter Corris. Lightning Meets the West Wind: The Malaita Massacre. Melbourne: Oxford University Press, 1980.
