= Stan Castles =

Australian rules footballer, born 1906

Personal information
- Full name: Stanley Willis Hordern Castles
- Born: 28 June 1906; Port Melbourne, Victoria
- Died: 8 March 1987 (aged 80); Cronulla, New South Wales
- Original team: Sydney (NSWFL)
- Height: 177 cm (5 ft 10 in)
- Weight: 67 kg (148 lb)
- Position: Full-Forward

Playing career^{1}
Years	Club	Games (Goals)
1929–1930	South Fremantle	16 (39)
1932	Fitzroy	2 (3)
Total		18 (42)

Representative team honours
Years	Team	Games (Goals)
1931	New South Wales	1 (1)
- ^{1} Playing statistics correct to the end of 1932.

Career highlights
- 1931: NSWFL Leading Goalkicker (109)

Stan Castles (28 June 1906 – 8 March 1987) was an Australian rules footballer who played with Fitzroy in the Victorian Football League (VFL) and South Fremantle in the Western Australian Football League (WAFL).

Born in Port Melbourne, Victoria, Castles joined the Royal Australian Navy aged 16 and served overseas on HMAS Adelaide. While stationed in Sydney in 1928, Castles played for local team Sydney in the New South Wales Football League (NSWFL), before leaving the Navy to move to Perth to marry Mena Halstrom.

Castles spent the 1929 and 1930 seasons with South Fremantle, playing 16 games and kicking 39 goals, with a best return of 6 goals in a match against Subiaco in Round 9 1930.

Castles returned to Sydney in 1931 and won the NSWFL Leading Goalkicker Award with 109 goals. Chosen for New South Wales for the interstate match against the Victorian Football Association (VFA) combined side in Sydney, Castles kicked 1 goal as New South Wales lost by 12 points.

Castles form attracted notice from VFL clubs, and he moved to Melbourne to play for Fitzroy. He made his senior VFL debut in Round 7, 1932, against Richmond at Punt Road Oval, kicking 2 goals in a 39 point loss. Castles kicked 1 goal the following week in the seniors, against Hawthorn, before being omitted from Fitzroy's league team.

Castles returned to the NSWFL in 1933 to play for Sydney. In retirement, he was a member of the Eastern Suburbs rugby union club committee. Castles died in Cronulla, New South Wales in 1987, aged 80.

== Sources ==
- Holmesby, R. & Main, J. (2014) The Encyclopedia of AFL Footballers: every AFL/VFL player since 1897 (10th ed.). Seaford, Victoria: BAS Publishing. ISBN 978-1-921496-32-5.
