= Marie Margaret Keesing =

New Zealand anthropologist (1904–1961)

- Born: 1 December 1904; Auckland, New Zealand
- Died: 13 July 1961 (aged 56); Stanford, California, U.S.
- Occupation: Anthropologist
- Spouse: Felix M. Keesing

Marie Margaret Keesing (née Martin; 1 December 1904 – 13 July 1961) was an anthropologist and educator with strong ties to the Pacific. With a degree in anthropology from the University of New Zealand, she spent most of her working life in the United States, where she worked closely with her husband, a fellow New Zealander and renowned anthropologist Felix Maxwell Keesing. She published a number of works, and co-authored several significant books with her husband, including Taming Philippine Headhunters: a Study of Government and of Cultural Change in Northern Luzon (1934) and Elite Communication in Samoa: A Study of Leadership (1956).

== Personal life ==
Keesing was born on 1 December 1904, in Auckland, New Zealand, to parents Frederick Samuel Martin and Alice Maude Peart. Her parents described themselves as missionaries, but their lives and commitments were more complicated and nuanced than that label usually allows. Their work with the local indigenous communities included providing medical attention, as well as running a local store. As a result, Marie grew up with Maori friends and neighbors. She writes about her childhood in the posthumous book Hidden Valleys and Unknown Shores (Harcourt 1978).

She attended the University of New Zealand and graduated with a BA in history in May 1926. She became engaged to Felix "Fee" Keesing that same month and they married in July 1928. During their engagement, setting a pattern she would follow throughout their lives, she collaborated with him as he rewrote his Master's thesis for the 1928 publication The Changing Maori (Thomas Avery & Son). Whilst not acknowledged as a co-author, she was always described as an ever present co-interlocutor, collaborator and companion.

Marie and Felix had two children: economist Donald Beaumont Keesing (b. 1933, London, died 25 April 2004 in Washington DC) and anthropologist Roger Martin Keesing (b 1935 Honolulu, died 1993, Canada). The family lived in Chicago, New Haven, London, Honolulu, Washington, D.C., before settling at Stanford University in the 1940s with Marie and Felix taking American citizenship in 1940s. Roger was an undergraduate at Stanford University and maintained a strong relationships with the institution throughout his lifetime. Donald was an associate professor at Stanford, and an undergraduate at Harvard; both he and Roger got their PhDs from Harvard. Felix Keesing died of a heart attack whilst playing a game of tennis in April 1961 at Stanford.

Marie Keesing died on 13 July 1961, after her husband's sudden death three months earlier. As George Spindler, long time Stanford colleague of the Keesings, put it, "She gave up her life, in the agony of grief over his death, on July 13." There is some speculation that she blamed herself for her husband's death and this, along with a bout of severe depression, drove her to suicide.

== Career ==
Like many other anthropological marriages of the first half of the 20th century, there is a kind of unevenness to Marie Keesing's record. She followed Felix Keesing's opportunities and carved out spaces to do her own work where she could, and also worked with him in research projects. As the wife of a working anthropological partnership, she is sometimes a recognized co-author with Felix, and sometimes a clear collaborator recognized only in fulsome terms in a publication's preface. However, her impact on Felix's work was acknowledged by his peers. As fellow anthropologist George Spindler wrote in Felix Keesing's obituary: "In all of his work he was aided by Marie Keesing, who was his collaborator on some of his books and his companion on most of his trips to remote peoples in the hinterlands of the Pacific." However, in the American Anthropologist obituary for Felix Keesing the following year, her co-authorship of several volumes appears erased.

Marie left New Zealand with Felix in 1928. Under the auspices of a multi-year Rockefeller Foundation Fellowship, Felix Keesing relocated to the United States, working at Yale and the University of Chicago. He and Marie spent time with the leading lights in American anthropology, fostering a particular interest in ethnohistory and culture-change.

In 1930, she and her husband moved to Honolulu to take up research positions at the Institute of Pacific Relations (IPR). The IPR, established in 1925, was an international NGO that provided a forum for discussion of problems and relations between nations of the Pacific Rim. Marie and Felix conducted fieldwork in Samoa and the Philippines in the early 1930s. Their interests in cultural change, transformation and structures of power, as well as ethno-historical approaches, culminated in the publication of Taming Philippine Headhunters: a Study of Government and of Cultural Change in Northern Luzon (1934).

After a brief stint at the London School of Economics, Felix took up the challenge of starting the first department as chairman of the Department of Anthropology and Sociology at the University of Hawaii. During his nearly decade-long tenure, Marie continued to work at the Institute for Public Relations, writing about issues in the Pacific region. She also became very active in women's organizations in this period. She was involved in the Pan Pacific Women's Association (PPWA) from its first meetings in 1928 and 1930; the association had a clear charter to raise and discuss questions affecting women and children across the Pacific, including social conditions. She was a regular participant in the PPWA meetings; she organized many panels and workshops including an important roundtable on the role of women in social systems in 1939.

During World War II, Felix Keesing was called to Washington, D.C., where he worked in the Office of Strategic Services. After a year in D.C., Felix relocated his family to Stanford University, where whilst establishing the Stanford Anthropology Department, he would continue to work with the United States government in a range of capacities through the 1950s. This included training Navy personnel about Pacific cultures and conducted surveys of former Japanese-occupied Pacific territories. It is unknown how much Marie participated in this work. She clearly was an active participant in his work in Western Samoa. Their work there culminating in the publication of Elite Communication in Samoa: A Study of Leadership (1956). At the time of their deaths, Felix and Marie were working on a new ethno-historical project revisiting their earliest work on the Philippines. The book, published posthumously is attributed only to Felix but Roger Keesing, their son, writes in the preface, that his mother "played a tireless role as editor, critic, contributor and companion, as she did in all of his [Felix's] work".

== Bibliography ==
- with Felix Keesing. 1931. Dependencies and Native Peoples of the Pacific: Preliminary Syllabus for Round Table Discussion. Institute of Pacific Relations
- with Felix Keesing. 1934. Taming Philippine Headhunters: a Study of Government and of Cultural Change in Northern Luzon. Allen & Unwin.
- with Lasker, Bruno, Elizabeth Field. 1935. Tradition & Progress: a study course on cultural contact in the pacific area. International Relations Office, American Association of University Women.
- 1939. Cultural Contributions of Pacific Countries. Pan-Pacific, April–June, 10.
- 1944: Pacific Islands in war and peace. American Council, Institute of Pacific Relations.
- 1945. "The Islands of the Pacific" in Spotlight on the Far East. Edited by Joseph Milton Bernstein & Marguerite Ann Stewart. A cooperative project between American Council, Institute of Pacific Relations, and Webster Publishing Company.
- with Felix Keesing, Ernest Beaglehole & EG Burrows. 1947. "Specialized studies in Polynesian anthropology". Bernice P. Bishop Museum Bulletin 193. Bernice P. Bishop Museum
- with Felix Keesing. 1956. Elite Communication in Samoa: A Study of Leadership. Stanford University Press.
- with Felix Keesing, & Thomas Blair. 1960. "Social Structure and information exposure in rural Brazil". Rural Sociology, 25: 65–75.
- with Charles Robinson. 1978. Hidden Valleys and Unknown Shores. Harcourt.
