= Keesing's Record of World Events =

Dutch magazine

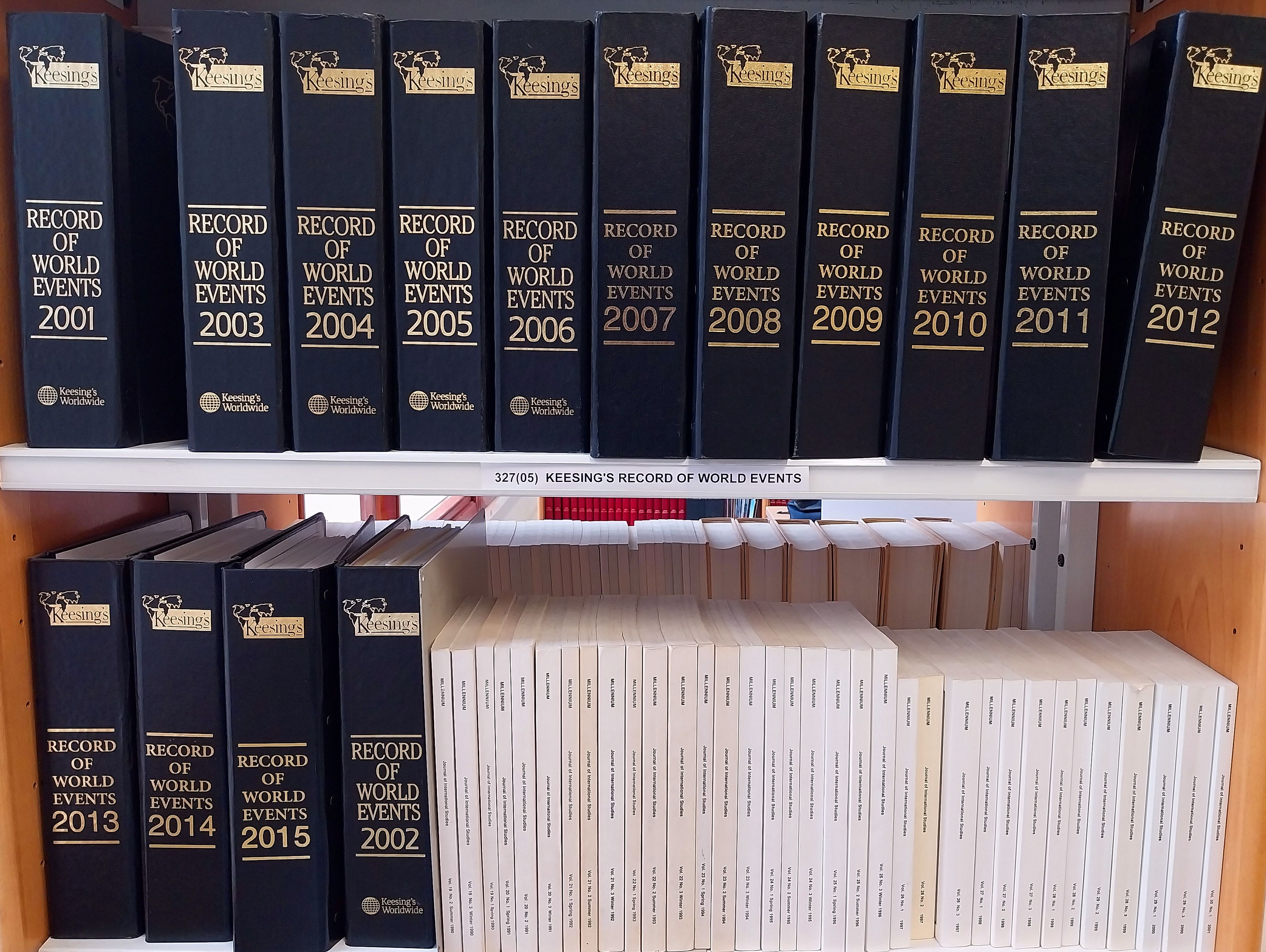
Annual volumes of Keesing's Record of World Events at the Biscay Campus Library of the University of the Basque Country (UPV/EHU).

Keesing's Record of World Events, originally called Keesing's Contemporary Archives, was a long-running summary of world news, published in regular instalments from 1931. It was developed in the Netherlands by its founder, Isaac Keesing. Its purpose was to provide a detailed, factual and neutral account of events across all parts of the world.

Isaac Keesing set up the company Systemen Keesing in Amsterdam in 1911, to summarise and publish economic and financial information from a wide range of national and international sources, and to make it available to subscribers. As the company expanded, in July 1931 he began to publish Keesing's Historical Archive as a periodical, subtitled "Illustrated Diary of Contemporary World Events with Constantly Updated Alphabetical Index". The aim was to provide objective information on political and economic changes around the world, with an index updated to maintain its value as a reference work. It appeared as a 16-page weekly magazine, published in Dutch, English, German and French.

Following the German occupation of the Netherlands in 1940, Isaac and his son Leo Keesing, as Jews, were dismissed from their company, which continued to operate in Amsterdam under German authority, managed by Peter Diesfelt. The English version was removed from the company's control, but continued to be published in London. The French version (Les Archives Contemporaines) was ended in 1941. The Keesing family returned from the U.S. to Amsterdam after the Second World War, and continued to develop the Dutch and German versions, but until 1991 had no control over the English edition, which was taken over by an American company in 1996. The German edition (Archiv der Gegenwart) continued until 2004; the Dutch edition (Keesings Historisch Archief) until 2013; and the English edition (from 1987 known as Keesing's Record of World Events) until 2016.
