= HMAS Adelaide (1918) =

Town-class light cruiser

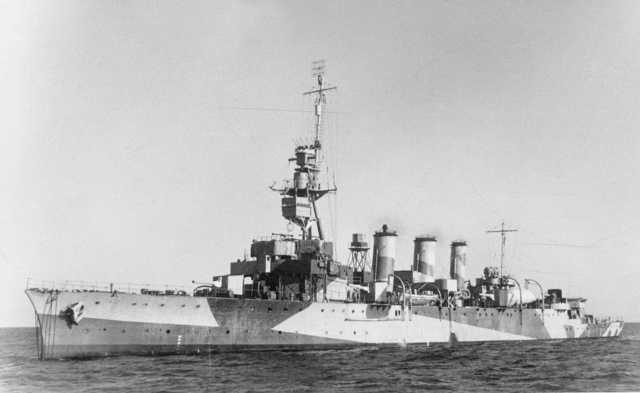
- Adelaide in her third armament configuration

History

Australia
- Name: Adelaide
- Namesake: City of Adelaide
- Builder: Cockatoo Island Dockyard
- Laid down: 20 November 1915
- Launched: 27 July 1918
- Completed: 31 July 1922
- Commissioned: 5 August 1922
- Decommissioned: 27 June 1928
- Recommissioned: 13 March 1939
- Decommissioned: 17 May 1939
- Recommissioned: 1 September 1939
- Decommissioned: 26 February 1945
- Recommissioned: 19 May 1945
- Decommissioned: 13 May 1946
- Motto: "Ut Prosint Omnibus Conjuncti"; "United for the Common Weal"
- Nickname(s): HMAS Longdelayed
- Honours and awards: Battle honours: Pacific 1941–43; East Indies 1942
- Fate: Sold for scrap

General characteristics
- Class & type: Town-class light cruiser
- Displacement: 5,560 long tons (5,650 t)
- Length: 138.8 m (455 ft)
- Beam: 14.9 m (49 ft)
- Draught: 5.7 m (19 ft)
- Installed power: 25,000 shp (19,000 kW)
- Propulsion: 2 shafts, steam turbines
- Speed: 25 knots (46 km/h; 29 mph)
- Complement: 1922: 33 officers and 450 sailors; 1941: 26 officers and 436 sailors
- Armament: Original configuration: 9 × single 6 in (152 mm) guns; 1 × single 3 in (76-mm) AA gun; 1 × single 12 pdr (3-inch)field gun; 4 × 3 pdr (47 mm (1.9 in)) saluting guns; 10 × .303-inch machine guns; 2 × 21 in (533 mm) torpedo tubes; 2 × depth charge chutes
- Armour: 3-inch (7.6 cm) side armour-belt over amidships section

HMAS Adelaide was a Town-class light cruiser of the Royal Australian Navy (RAN), named after Adelaide, the capital city of South Australia. Laid down in 1915, wartime shortages and design modifications meant the ship was not completed until 1922, earning her the nickname "HMAS Longdelayed".

Adelaide served with the Royal Navy's Special Service Squadron during 1924 and 1925, and was involved in the 1927 Malaita massacre. She was decommissioned in 1928, but was modernised and returned to service just before World War II began. During the war, Adelaide was involved in successful efforts to secure the colony of New Caledonia for Free France, was present during the Japanese midget submarine attack on Sydney Harbour, and intercepted the German blockade runner Ramses.

The cruiser was decommissioned in 1946, and broken up for scrap in 1949.

== Design and construction ==
The design of Adelaide was modified from the Chatham subclass of the Town-class light cruisers, with similarities to the Birmingham subclass. The ship was 462 feet 6.5 inches (140.983 m) long overall and 430 feet (130 m) between perpendiculars, with a beam of 49 feet 9.5 inches (15.177 m), and a draught of 19.66 feet (5.99 m). The initial ship's company stood at 33 officers and 450 sailors, but by 1941, this had dropped to 26 officers and 436 sailors.

The propulsion system consisted of Parsons turbines providing 25,000 shaft horsepower (19,000 kW) to two propeller shafts. As designed, the ship had a maximum speed of 25 knots (46 km/h; 29 mph), but modifications during her career saw this increase to 25.5 knots (47.2 km/h; 29.3 mph) during the 1920s, then drop to 24.8 knots (45.9 km/h; 28.5 mph) by 1941. The cruiser was originally fuelled by both coal and oil, but the ship's refit in 1938–39 saw her converted to oil only, along with the removal of the foremost funnel and boilers.

Adelaide was laid down at the Cockatoo Island Dockyard, Sydney on 20 November 1915. She was launched on 27 July 1918 by Lady Helen Munro Ferguson, the wife of the Governor-General of Australia, Sir Ronald Munro Ferguson. Construction was not completed until 31 July 1922 because of wartime shortages, loss of machinery part forgings for items that could not be made in Australia to enemy action, and modifications based on wartime experience: the ship was consequently nicknamed "HMAS Longdelayed". She was finally commissioned into the RAN on 5 August 1922. Adelaide cost 1,271,782 pounds to build.

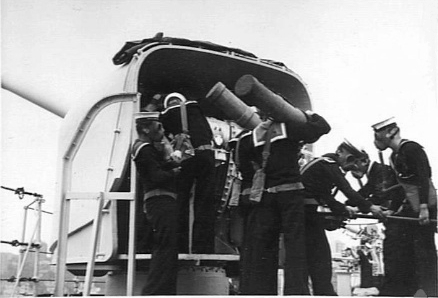
Gun crew loading one of Adelaide's 6-inch guns in 1939

The ship's badge was based on the municipal seal of the City of Adelaide. Her motto was "Ut Prosint Omnibus Conjuncti", Latin for "United for the Common Weal". Some incorrect versions of the ship's badge show the motto as "United We Stand", the motto for HMAS Anzac.

=== Armament ===
At launch, the cruiser's armament consisted of nine BL 6-inch Mk XII naval guns, a single QF 3-inch anti-aircraft gun, a single Ordnance QF 12-pounder 8 cwt field gun, four QF 3-pounder Hotchkiss saluting guns, ten .303-inch machine guns (a mix of Lewis and Maxim guns), two submerged broadside 21-inch torpedo tubes, and two depth charge chutes. The number of machine guns was increased to twelve in 1924.

During a refit in 1938 and 1939, Adelaide's armament was altered. One 6-inch gun, the field gun, the anti-aircraft gun, and the torpedo tubes were all removed. They were replaced with three 4-inch anti-aircraft guns. Fire-control equipment was also upgraded at this time. During May and June 1942, the anti-aircraft armament was supplemented by six 20 mm Oerlikon guns. Another refit lasting from June to September 1943 saw a second 6-inch gun removed, the 4-inch armament reduced to two guns, and four hydraulic depth charge throwers installed.

== Operational history ==
=== 1922–1939 ===
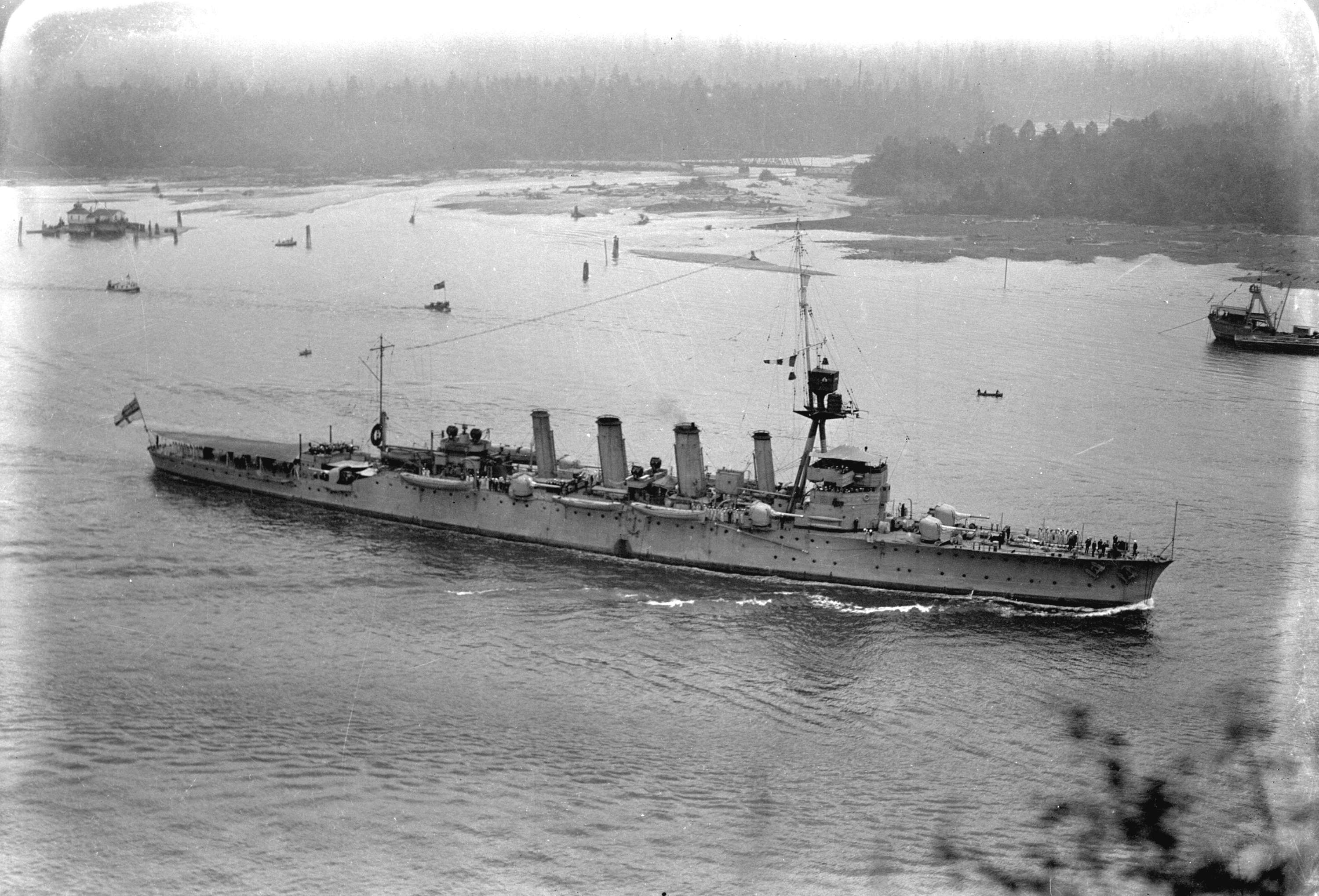
Adelaide sailing into Burrard Inlet in British Columbia, Canada, during the 1924 Special Service Squadron world cruise.

After a brief sea-trials and working up period off Jervis Bay, Adelaide spent the period from commissioning until February 1924 operating on standard duties and exercises throughout the Australia Station. On 18 April 1924, following a brief refit, she joined the Royal Navy's Special Service Squadron for a flag-showing cruise outside Australian waters. During the voyage, Adelaide visited New Zealand, Fiji, Hawaii, the western coasts of Canada and the United States, the Panama Canal (becoming the first RAN ship to travel through), the Caribbean, and eastern Canada, before reaching Portsmouth on 28 September. The cruiser left for home on 10 January 1925, sailing via the Mediterranean, Ceylon, Singapore, and Thursday Island, and reached Sydney on 7 April.

In October 1927, Adelaide was called to the Solomon Islands in response to the killing of a district officer, a cadet, and fifteen native police by Kwaio natives at Malaita. Arriving at Tulagi on 14 October, an officer and sixteen sailors were sent ashore to reinforce local law enforcement. The ship then proceeded to Malaita to protect the landing of three platoons of troops on 17 October, then remained in the area to provide personnel support for the soldiers as they searched for the killers, in what became the Malaita massacre. Adelaide returned to Australia on 23 November. Over the next year, Adelaide continued a pattern of exercises and promotional visits to Australian ports.

The cruiser was paid off into reserve on 27 June 1928. During 1938 and 1939, the ship underwent a 60,000 pound modernisation, which included the conversion from both coal and oil as fuel to oil-only (requiring the removal of two boilers and an exhaust funnel), and alterations to the cruiser's armament. The cruiser was recommissioned on 13 March 1939, and undertook exercises with the Australian and New Zealand Squadrons. The ship returned to Sydney in late April, and was paid off again on 17 May, so that the ship's company could be sent to England aboard SS Autolycus to commission the new light cruiser HMAS Perth. With the threat of war in Europe imminent, Adelaide was prepared for a return to service, and was commissioned on 1 September.

=== World War II ===
The ship was initially used for convoy escort and protection duties in Australian waters.

In September 1940, Adelaide played a key role in the rallying of New Caledonia to Free France, carrying the French official Henri Sautot from the New Hebrides (later Vanuatu) to Nouméa, New Caledonia. Sautot had been appointed governor by Free French leader Charles de Gaulle, following attempts by Vichy France to gain control of the French colony. On 3 September, while en route, Adelaide collided with the merchant vessel SS Coptic. (Although both ships only suffered minor damage, the Shaw, Savill & Albion Line sued the Australian government in 1947 for £35,000 in damages.) After Sautot landed, on 25 September, Adelaide patrolled off the coast, to counter a perceived threat from the Vichy sloop Dumont d'Urville. The Australian cruiser remained in the area until the situation had stabilised, returning to Sydney on 8 October. Adelaide resumed escort and patrol duties around Australia and New Guinea waters.

During May to July 1942, Adelaide was docked at Garden Island for a refit, focused primarily on increasing the ship's anti-aircraft weapon outfit. Consequently, the ship was one of several major Allied vessels in Sydney Harbour during the Japanese midget submarine attack of 31 May 1942. After the refit, Adelaide was assigned to Fremantle for convoy escort work in the Indian Ocean.

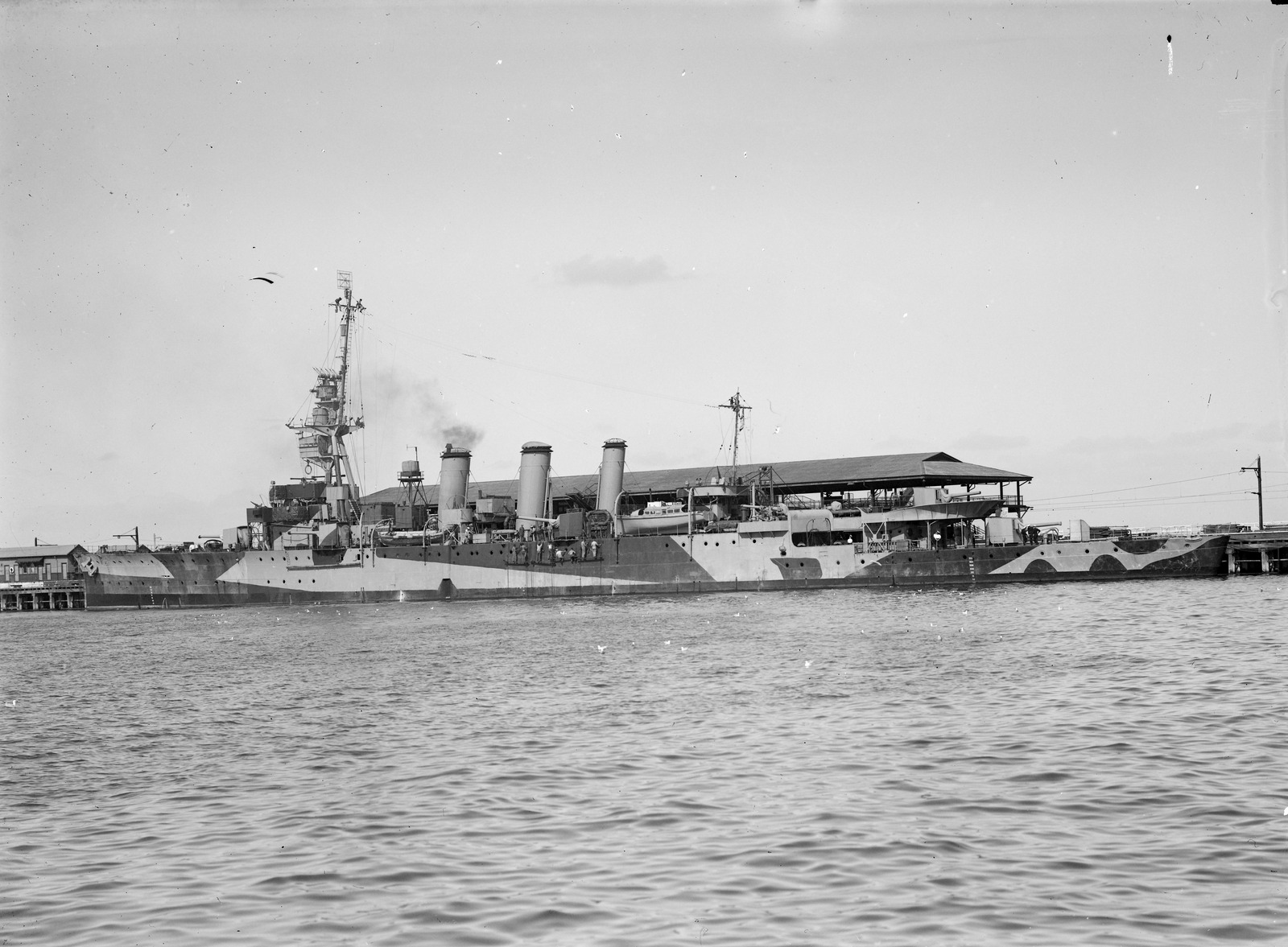
Adelaide in 1944

In November 1942, Adelaide, along with the Dutch cruiser HNLMS Jacob van Heemskerk and the Australian corvettes Cessnock and Toowoomba, escorted a convoy across the southern Indian Ocean. On 28 November, the ships spotted an unidentified vessel, which claimed to be the Norwegian merchantman Taiyang. Officers aboard Adelaide recognised the ship as the German blockade runner Ramses, but did not receive a response to their challenging until two boats were lowered from the ship, followed by the sound of an explosion from a scuttling charge. Adelaide opened fire, hitting with the third salvo onwards, and continued shooting until Ramses sank eight minutes later, then recovered the Germans from the boats.

Adelaide continued to operate from Fremantle until October 1944, apart from a refit at Williamstown Naval Dockyard from June to September 1943, where further armament alterations were made. On 8 October 1944, the cruiser made for Sydney. On 26 February 1945, Adelaide was decommissioned, but then recommissioned on 19 May to serve as a tender to the naval base HMAS Penguin. Adelaide was awarded the battle honours "Pacific 1941–43" and "East Indies 1942" for her wartime service.

== Decommissioning and fate ==
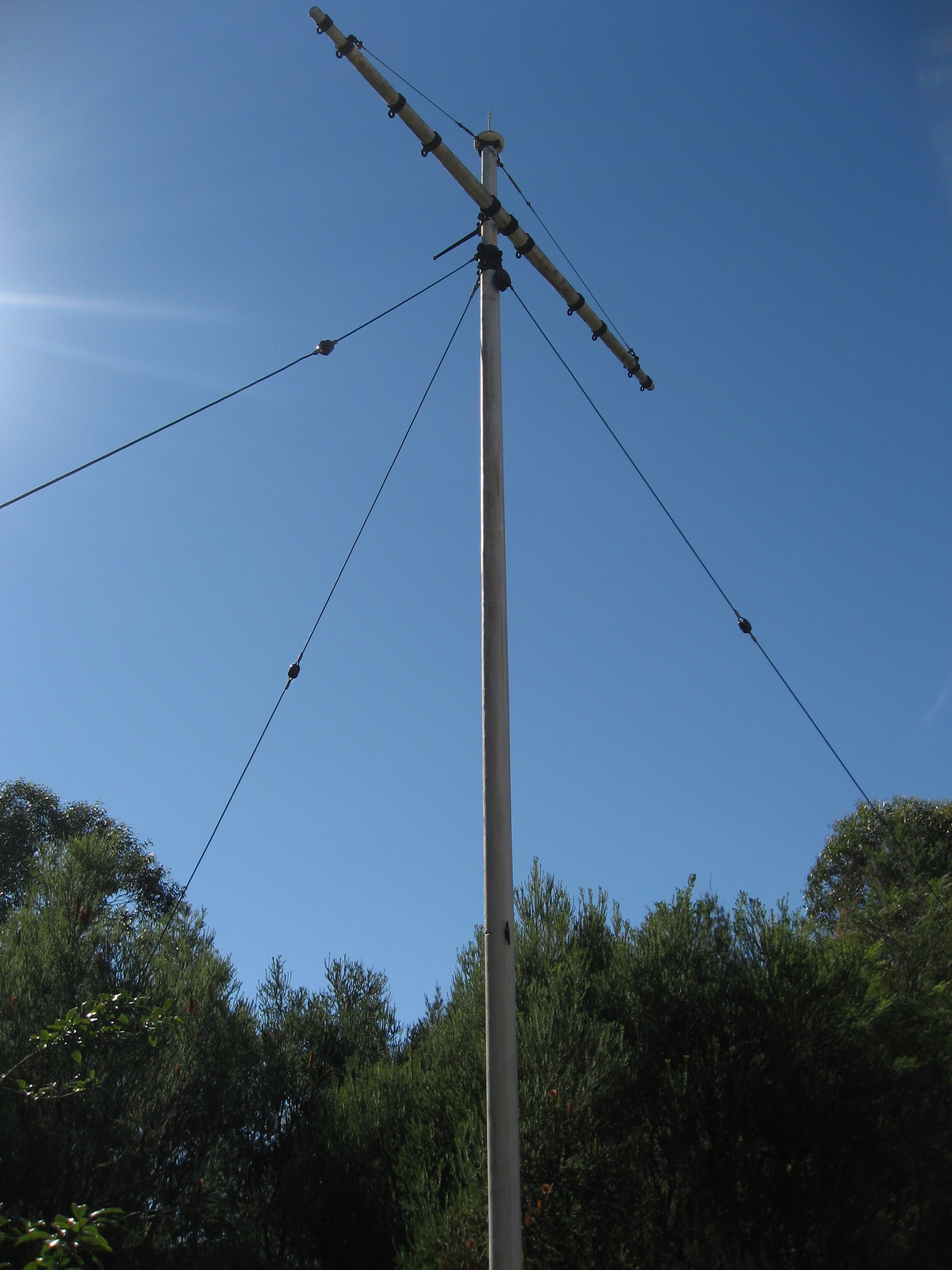
Adelaide's main-mast at Ku-ring-gai Chase National Park

Adelaide was decommissioned for the final time on 13 May 1946. The ship was stripped of equipment during 1947, and on 24 January 1949, the hulk was sold to Australian Iron and Steel for breaking up. Adelaide was towed by the tug HMAS Reserve to Port Kembla during 1 and 2 April, where she was scrapped. The deck timber was used to build the ferry Radar for Charles Rosman.

As a memorial to the ship the main-mast was erected alongside the Sphynx Memorial in Ku-ring-gai Chase National Park, Sydney, in about 1950. An information plaque with a diagram of the ship was installed nearby. One of the cruiser's 6-inch guns was found at a rubbish tip in Victoria; this was restored, then placed on display at HMAS Cerberus, Victoria. The ship's bell came first to the Amazon Hotel in Exeter, England, removed to the Spice Lounge restaurant in Exmouth.

In 2014, a shield removed from HMAS Adelaide during a refit in 1943 and dumped on a tip on the Mornington Peninsula, Victoria, was transported to Perth for refurbishment. A member of the Royal Australian Artillery Historical Society of Western Australia, which had been searching for such a shield for 20 years as a match for a 6-inch Mk XI naval gun it held from HMAS Sydney, a ship scrapped in 1928, had spotted the shield at location. The naval gun and shield were installed at the Leighton Battery in September 2015 to replicate the original 6-inch guns at site.
