= Malaita massacre =

1927 massacre in Malaita, Solomon Islands

Malaita
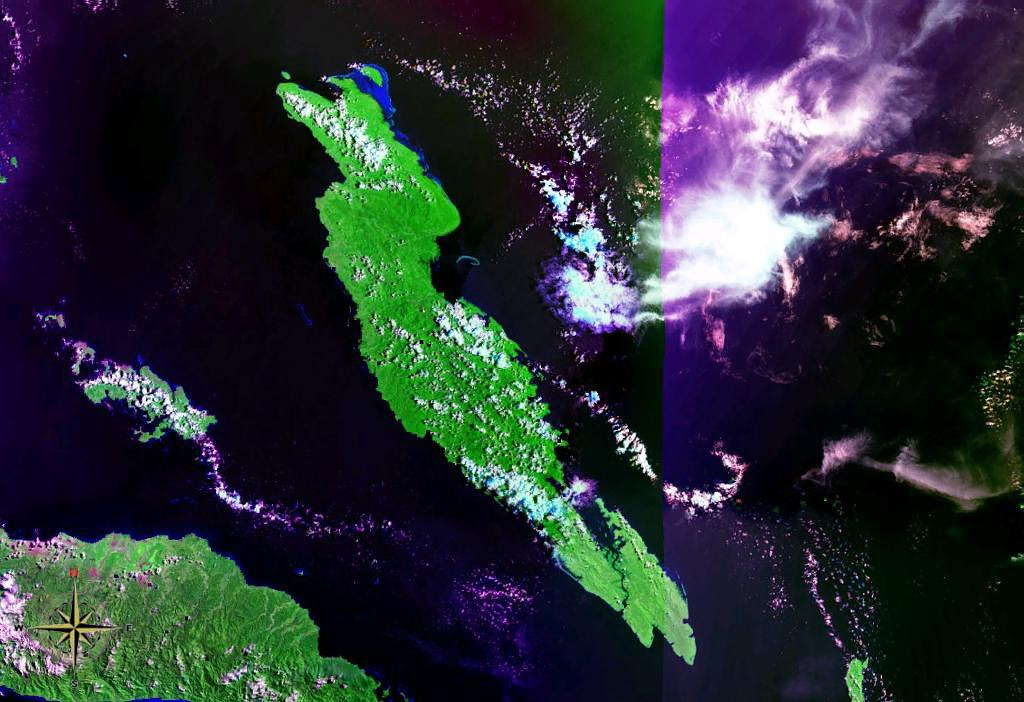
- Malaita Island seen from space (false color)

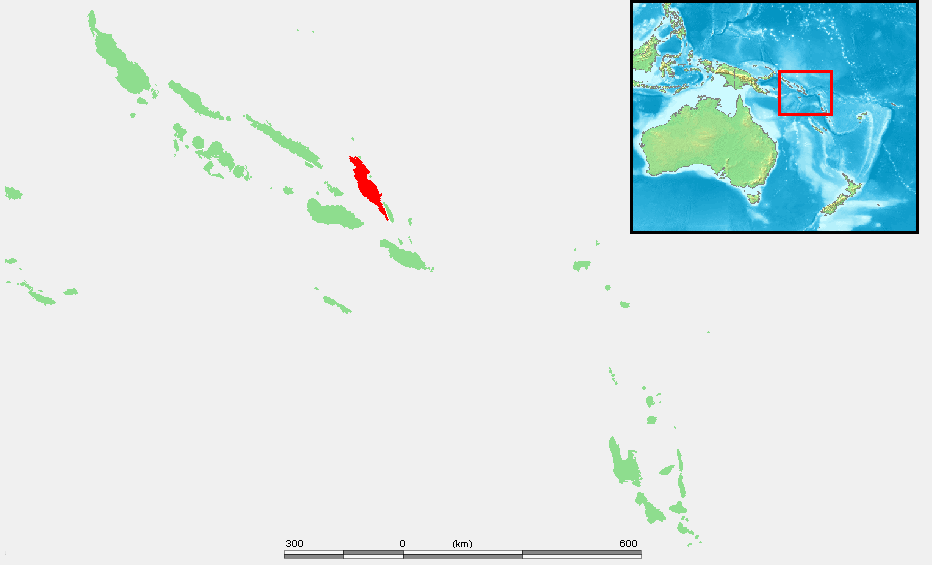

Geography
- Location: Pacific Ocean
- Coordinates: 9°01′03″S 160°57′14″E
- Archipelago: Solomon Islands

Administration
- Solomon Islands
- Province: Malaita
- Largest settlement: Auki

The Malaita massacre inflicted a large number of deaths on the island of Malaita in the Solomon Islands in late 1927. William R. Bell, the District Officer of Malaita in the British Solomon Islands Protectorate, and many of his deputies were killed by Basiana and other Kwaio warriors as part of a plan to resist the head tax imposed by the colonial authorities and what was perceived as an assault on the traditional values. A retributive raid was organised that ultimately resulted in the death of about 60 Kwaio, in addition to nearly 200 incarcerated and a systematic destruction and desecration of important Kwaio ancestral shrines and ritual objects. The event was of extreme significance for the Kwaio people, and has greatly affected their way of life.

== Tax collection massacre ==
In September 1927, various Kwaio, led by Basiana, planned an attack on Bell and his party when they came for the tax collection. They attempted to recruit plotters by advancing their grievances against Bell and the government, especially the empowerment of Christian coastal groups that were seen to dishonour their ancestors. Word of the plot spread across the island, and Bell and his police were warned well in advance. However, understanding local mores, Bell decided the best approach was to make a show of strength, and thereby command the respect of the locals and achieve their compliance. Collecting taxes offshore or calling residents up one by one, as some of his deputies urged, would reveal weakness.

On Monday, 3 October 1927, District Officer Bell moored his ship, the Auki, in Singalagu Harbour, and set up the usual tax collection operation at the house in the glen nearby. At dawn on Tuesday, Basiana and the other warriors made their way to the tax collection site. When the warriors arrived, Bell announced his peaceful intentions and invited them to pay their taxes. Basiana paid his tax first and went back to the edge of the clearing where his pouch was. Then he took the barrel of his rifle, concealed it between his arm and body, and slipped back into the line. He worked his way to the front of the line, and while Bell was writing on the tax roll, he took the rifle, raised it high and smashed it into his skull with such force that Bell's head virtually exploded. Basiana then sprung onto the table and into the tax house.

Meanwhile, some of the other warriors in Basiana's party attacked Kenneth Lillies, a British cadet serving as Bell's assistant. The machete blow was deflected by another policeman, and he was able to fire his revolver in point blank range at the attackers, wounding two, before another attacker was able to shoot him in the chest with a discarded rifle. Makasi, another policeman, picked up the rifle next to him and was able to kill one of the attackers. The other officials in front of the tax house were quickly set upon by other warriors.

Minutes before, one group of attackers had cut through the loia cane that fastened the tax house, and were able to pull down the walls, pinioning eight policemen inside against their rifles. Only one constable was able to escape the tax house, and sprinted to the jetty and was able to swim to safety. The others fought the best they could, but the first to shoot, Constable Kabini, had his rifle misfire, and thus Basiana was not killed as he sprang into the house. In all, 15 officials, including Bell and Lillies, were killed. One of the attacking party, shot by Makasi, was killed, plus about half a dozen wounded.

== Punitive expedition ==
The survivors made their way to the Auki and the Wheatsheaf and waited while a small party of Kwaio Christians went ashore to recover Bell's and Lillies' bodies and wrapped them in sailcloth. The two ships, along with the Advent, anchored near the mouth of the harbour, sailed to Ngongosila where Bell and Lillies were buried together. Then the Auki and the Wheatsheaf sailed off to Tulagi to bring the news to the protectorate headquarters.

In Tulagi, the Resident Commissioner, Richard Rutledge Kane, was off on tour, and his deputy, Captain N.S.B. Kidson, who had little experience in the Solomons, surmised that the Malaitans were in a general uprising. The High Commissioner in Suva requested a ship to be sent to the Solomons, and HMAS Adelaide sailed from Sydney on 10 October. Australia's quick response symbolised the bond between Australia and the Solomons, official, religious, and commercial, and newspapers printed hundreds of articles about the massacre and its aftermath.

Talk of a punitive expedition began almost immediately among the Europeans in Tulagi. When Resident Commissioner R.R. Kane returned to the capital, much had already been prepared. Dozens of Europeans volunteered their services, but in the end 28 Europeans, mostly planters, were selected to make up the civilian force. They were issued with .303 rifles and given intensive training. The District Officer of Guadalcanal, C.E.J. Wilson, who had a reputation for roughness from his treatment of some resistance on Guadalcanal, was given orders to patrol the coast of Malaita to gather information. Some village constables returned with Wilson and pleaded that those who had paid their taxes (listed in Bell's tax rolls) the day before not be punished. These people were already in coastal villages, anticipating an official retaliation. In Auki, the Malaitan district headquarters, 880 Malaitans had volunteered to participate in the expedition. Officials, knowing that most were probably simply eager to avenge dead relatives or other old scores, decided to limit their participation, and only accepted the help of 40, who for the most part had served in Bell's police force. The group was rounded out by fifty naval personnel from Adelaide and 120 native carriers.

The first armed party landed from Adelaide on Sunday, 16 October, twelve days after the killing. Five days later, the Ramadi with the colonial officials and the 28 Europeans, anchored in the harbour. A staging area was built 1,600 feet up the mountain. On 26 October, the party set out for the interior, travelling in a line over a quarter-mile long. The leaders of the expedition had considerable trouble keeping the European volunteer army in check, and some volunteers, who had been led to believe they would be permitted to shoot natives on sight, felt betrayed by the limitations and reprimands from their leadership. They had considerable difficulty with the terrain, drank whisky and gambled, and most were dismissed after a fortnight.

The naval personnel, added to "stiffen" the civilian party, also had considerable difficulty with the conditions; when Adelaide returned to Sydney on 18 November, 20% of the crew were hospitalised for malaria, dysentery, and septic sores. The naval presence had been thought necessary for dealing with an open rebellion, but as it became clear that the early messages had been exaggerated, their presence was largely unnecessary.

The Europeans largely were no threat to the resistant Kwaio, but the fellow Malaitan police patrols, led by constables who had worked with Bell, were. The only advantage of the Kwaio was a better knowledge of the local landscape, but that was balanced by assistance from some Kwaio guides from the coastal area. Another act which the northern Malaitans took considerable zeal was the systematic desecration of Kwaio holy sites. Ancestral skulls, consecrated objects, and other relics were crushed, burned, or thrown into menstrual huts. Though the police force was Christian, traditional Kwaio religion was similar to that which they had been raised in, and they knew how to most effectively bring the wrath of the ancestors (who punish only their own descendants) upon the Kwaio.

Despite the official command, the dominant leaders in the expedition party were Bell's sergeants and constables, who remained loyal to Bell and wished to avenge his death. In addition, it was decided that all adult male members of the bush kin groups were to be arrested and sent to Tulagi, including large numbers of elderly men who were not involved or only peripherally involved in the massacre. Most of the most wanted men were not found in the search, but rather gave themselves up as rumours spread about killings of women, children, old men, and others not involved in the massacre. The inland base camp was deserted on 21 December, when twenty fugitives remained at large, but all but one surrendered or were captured in the subsequent weeks.

The police reported the shooting of 27 Kwaio, said to have been attacking patrols, resisting arrest, or trying to flee. An exact number of Kwaio killed during the expedition as a whole is impossible to establish; the estimate of South Seas Evangelical Mission missionaries in the Kwaio area, 60, though dismissed by the government as an exaggeration, was accepted by Roger M. Keesing, who thoroughly studied both the official reports and the memories of the Kwaio forty years later. Keesing reports accounting for 55 deaths as virtually certain. The Kwaio themselves often estimate the number at 200. Keesing accounted for this large estimate as including deaths caused by the supernatural vengeance of the ancestors, upset at the desecration of their shrines.

== Aftermath ==
In total, 198 Kwaio were arrested and detained between November 1927 and February 1928. They were held in a stockade near the harbour, awaiting transport on the Ramadi to Tulagi, where they waited in prison without formal charges pressed against them. Reacting to the prison food and the crowded conditions, many suffered diseases. In February, dysentery broke out, and in the months to follow, 173 of them were admitted to hospital for it. In all, 30 of the prisoners died from diseases while in gaol. The government, reacting to accounts of the deaths, responded that many of these were older men, said to be senile or otherwise already weak. However, they did not explain why such men were being held.

A long pre-trial investigation followed, consolidating testimonies by survivors and detainees. The legal authorities recognised from the investigation who had actually plotted the murder, and it was understood they had used their political dominance to keep others in line. A balance had to be struck between the desire to set an example and to maintain strict British justice, and in the end, it was decided to charge with murder anyone who could be shown to have killed government officers or police, and to imprison others who had inflicted wounds, attempted murder, or otherwise played a central part. In all, 11 men were charged with murder, and six were convicted; of the 71 eventually charged with lesser offences, 21 were convicted. Basiana, who had killed Bell, was hanged publicly on 29 June 1928, in front of his two sons.

In June 1928, seeking a solution to the problem of what to do with those who were acquitted or never charged with crimes, the High Commissioner in Fiji issued a "King's Regulation to Authorise the Detention of Certain Natives Formerly Living on the Island of Malaita." It declared as "legal and valid" "all acts" committed in connection with the detention "in order to preserve peace and good order within the Protectorate", and extended the detention period six months. This permitted Resident Commissioner Kane to continue planning for the resettlement of the Kwaio on another island, an idea he had conceived already in November 1927. However, Lieutenant-Colonel H.C. Moorhouse, who had considerable colonial experience in Africa and was sent by London to investigate the massacre, quashed the scheme, and urged for the rapid repatriation of the detainees. In August 1928, the remaining detainees were returned to Malaita, and rations of rice were distributed.

During the punitive expedition, many Kwaio sought refuge in Christian villages, and after their sacred sites were polluted, hundreds converted to Christianity rather than face ancestral punishment. There was a precipitous drop in the interior population relative to the coast, and villages became slightly smaller and more widely scattered. The effective end of the power of the ramo and blood feuding increased spatial mobility and reduced sexual mores.

The records kept relating to the massacre were helpful in establishing a lengthy demographic history of the Kwaio people for ethnographer Roger M. Keesing; such a long record is possibly unique among traditional Melanesian societies.

== See also ==
- List of massacres in the Solomon Islands
