= Isaac Keesing =

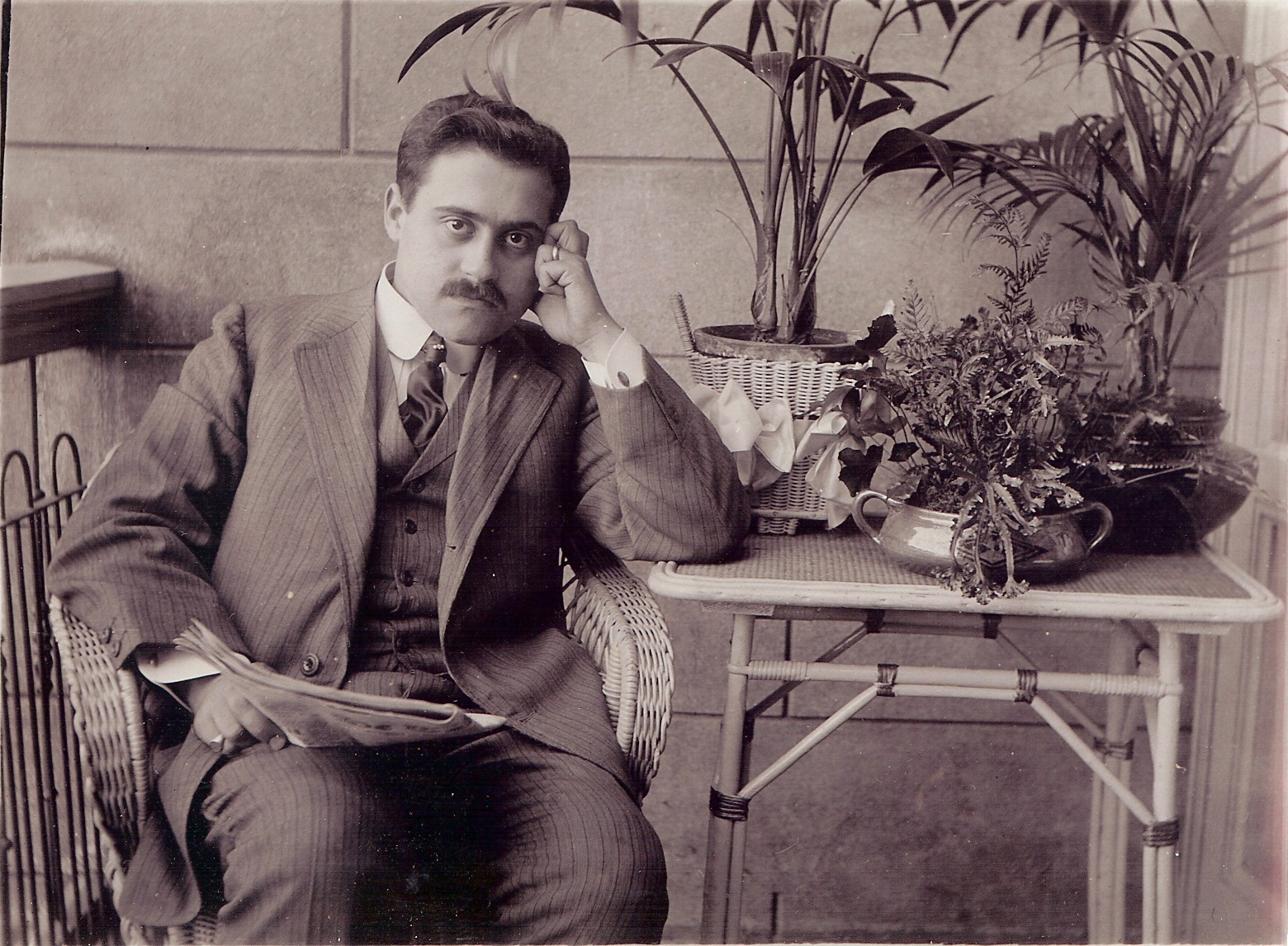
- Keesing, c. 1910
- Born: 1 August 1886; Amsterdam, Netherlands
- Died: 18 August 1966 (aged 80); Amsterdam, Netherlands
- Occupations: Publisher, journalist, author, inventor
- Known for: Keesing's Contemporary Archives

Isaac Keesing (1 August 1886 – 18 August 1966) was a Dutch journalist, writer, and publisher. Among his enterprises was Keesing's Contemporary Archives, published internationally between 1931 and 2016.

== Biography ==
He was born on 1 August 1886, Amsterdam, to Tobie Keesing, a Jewish diamond broker, and Elisabeth (née Zeehandelaar). Isaac Keesing started work at the Amsterdamsche Bank, and also wrote articles on financial and economic matters for various newspapers, including The New York Times. He devised a way of storing his information on a card index system, to obtain immediate access to it. The archive of information became well-used, and in 1911 he set up a company, Systemen Keesing, to summarise and publish economic and financial information from a wide range of national and international sources, and to make it available to subscribers. Its success led Keesing to seek to broaden its scope, and it expanded by establishing offices in Brussels, London and Paris.

In 1916, Keesing began publishing a magazine, Jong Nederland, aimed at students and young people; it continued until 1932. In 1919 he received a patent in the Netherlands for developing a type of box with a heated spout for dispensing the sealing wax used for sealing letters and documents (and he received a U.S. patent for the device in 1922). His method was claimed to be safer and to produce less of an unpleasant smell than the traditional method of dripping wax from a flaming candle. In 1923, Keesing was approached by a friend, Karel Henri Broekhoff, to take over and publish a periodical bulletin issued by the International Criminal Police Commission (ICPC, later known as Interpol), on information for exchange offices, banks and police dealing with forged money and cheques. Keesing's periodical was known as Contrefaçons et Falsifications ("Counterfeits and Forgeries").

He also established the first Dutch language series of puzzle books, Denksport, first published in 1930, which have continued up to the present, now as part of the Keesing Media Group. Keesing Media now publishes puzzle books and apps in various countries and languages, and claims to be "the world's leading puzzle company".

Another company that still bears his name and is active up to this day is Keesing Technologies, a tech company specializing in document and identity verification. Keesing Technologies is a subsidiary of SURYS, which is currently owned by IN Group, which in turn is owned by the government of France.

Keesing began publishing both Keesing's Historical Archive and Keesing's Medical Archive as periodicals in 1931. The Historical Archive, started in July 1931, was subtitled "Illustrated Diary of Contemporary World Events with Constantly Updated Alphabetical Index". The aim was to provide objective information on political and economic changes around the world, with an index updated to maintain its value as a reference work. It appeared as a 16-page weekly magazine, published in Dutch, English, German and French. The company exhibited at the Brussels International Exposition in 1935, and by the following year had expanded to have over 80 employees. Keesing's son, Leo Keesing (1912–1997), became a company director and in 1938 was responsible for establishing an English edition of the Medical Archive in the United States.

Following the German occupation of the Netherlands in 1940, Isaac Keesing's brother Jacob and his family tried to escape to England by boat, but the attempt failed and they committed suicide. The imposition of German controls meant that Isaac and Leo Keesing, as Jews, were dismissed from their company, but through the intervention of Broekhoff – at that time commissioner of the Amsterdam police – and an administrative error by the Germans, they were permitted to emigrate, eventually reaching the United States via Spain, Portugal, and Cuba, where they were interned for a time. Keesing and his family lived during the latter part of the Second World War in Washington, D.C., where he worked at the Dutch embassy.

Keesing returned to the Netherlands after the war. In his absence the company had been maintained by his accountant, Peter Diesfelt, but its output had been heavily biased towards German propaganda, and its premises had been looted. The British branch of the company had been removed from the family's control. Isaac and Leo Keesing re-established the company, and set up a subsidiary, ASSiMiL, producing language courses, many supported by gramophone records.

Isaac Keesing also wrote and published a popular series of children's books, starting in 1948 with Opa vertelt ("Grandpa tells").

He married Mariana Sophia Peekel in 1910; they had four children. He died in Amsterdam, on 18 August 1966, aged 80, and was buried at Muiderberg.
