= Felix M. Keesing =

American anthropologist (1902–1961)

Felix M. Keesing (January 5, 1902 – April 1961) was a New Zealand-born anthropologist who specialized in the study of the Philippine Islands and the South Pacific. He came to the United States in the 1940s and taught at Stanford University, California, 1942–1961.

He and Marie Margaret Martin Keesing, also an anthropologist, were married in July 1928. They had two sons, economist Donald Beaumont Keesing (1933–2004) and Roger Martin Keesing (1935–1993), who also became an anthropologist.

== Early life and family ==
Felix Keesing was born in Taiping, Perak, in what was then British Malaya, on January 5, 1902. Known to his friends as “Fee,” Keesing graduated from Auckland University College in 1926 with first-class honors in education. He was soon engaged to marry Marie Martin. During their engagement, setting a pattern they would follow throughout their lives, Marie collaborated with him as he rewrote his Master's thesis for the 1928 publication The Changing Maori (Thomas Avery & Son). Marie was not acknowledged as a co-author but described as a co-interlocutor, collaborator and companion. The family lived in Chicago, New Haven, London, Honolulu, Washington DC, before settling at Stanford University in 1942. The Keesings took American citizenship in the 1940s. Felix Keesing died of a heart attack during a game of tennis in April 1961 at Stanford. Marie Keesing died three months later, on July 13, 1961.

== Career and impact ==
Felix Keesing earned his A.B. in 1924, his master's degree in 1925, and Litt. D in 1934 from the University of New Zealand. As a teenager, he had visited the United States on a scholarship as an artist. In Chicago he sketched life in poor neighborhoods and decided to become an anthropologist in order to understand why people behaved in the ways they did. After his marriage in 1928, he received support from the Rockefeller Foundation to study first at the University of Chicago, then Yale University.

in 1930 Keesing was appointed to head a research project of the Institute of Pacific Relations that explored the Dependencies and Native Peoples of the Pacific. He published works on American Samoa and the Philippines for the project before going to the London School of Economics in 1933, then to University of Hawaii in 1934. He stayed in Hawaii for three years. In the 1930s, the Keesings also pursued research among the Menominee Indians of Wisconsin. Their 1939 study, The Menomini Indians of Wisconsin, reported that many features of Native American cultures that anthropologists had assumed to be "aboriginal" were in fact produced by interaction with European societies. At the time, however, the study did not receive the attention it deserved, probably because the field of anthropology did not yet appreciate the role of historical change in peoples they regarded as primitive.

On the eve of World War II spreading to the Pacific, Keesing's The South Seas in the Modern World (1941) set out to "define comprehensively the political, strategic, and economic role the Oceanic islands play in the world today, and especially the modern experience and problems of the people native to them." Keesing put his anthropological knowledge to work as the principal advisor on the South Pacific to the Office of War Information, which gathered intelligence and prepared briefings for the American military.

The Keesings came to Stanford in 1942 to participate in a training program for the United States Army, and Felix subsequently trained naval officers for service in the South Pacific. These programs continued his activities in the field of applied anthropology, that is, using scholarly knowledge for training and policy analysis. After the war, Keesing remained at Stanford, and became head of the Department of Anthropology. In addition to carrying out several missions to the South Pacific for the American government, Keesing published prolifically and was especially known for his studies of culture change.

He was elected president of the Association for Asian Studies in 1953.

== Major works ==
- —— (1928). The Changing Maori. Memoirs of the Board of Maori ethnological research, vol. 4. New Plymouth, N.Z.: Printed by T. Avery & sons.
- —— (1934). Modern Samoa: Its Government and Changing Life. Stanford university, California: Stanford University press.
- ——; Keesing, Marie M. (1934). Taming Philippine Headhunters; a Study of Government and of Cultural Change in Northern Luzon. Stanford: Stanford University Press.
- —— (1939). The Menomini Indians of Wisconsin: A Study of Three Centuries of Cultural Contact and Change. Vol. 10. Philadelphia, PA: American Philosophical Society.
- —— (1942). The South Seas in the Modern World. Institute of Pacific Relations. International national research series. New York: J. Day Co.
- —— (1945). Native Peoples of the Pacific World. The Pacific world series, under the auspices of the American Committee for International Wildlife Protection. New York: The Macmillan Company.
- —— (1949). Handbook on the Trust Territory of the Pacific Islands; a Handbook for Use in Training and Administration. Washington: Navy Dept., Office of the Chief of Naval Operations.
- —— (1950). The Pacific Island Peoples in the Postwar World. Condon lectures. Eugene: Oregon State System of Higher Education.
- —— (1953). Social Anthropology in Polynesia: A Review of Research. London; New York: Oxford University Press.
- —— (1958). Cultural Anthropology; the Science of Custom. New York: Rinehart.
- —— (1968). A Brief Characterization of Lepanto Society, Northern Philippines. Sagada social studies; no. 13. Sagada, Philippines: Igorot Study Center.
