= William R. Bell =

British colonial administrator (1876–1927)

William Robert Bell (7 August 1876 – 4 October 1927) was an Australian-born official in the British Solomon Islands Protectorate, who served as the District Officer of Malaita from 1915 until 1927. He was killed while collecting a head tax from the Kwaio of central Malaita. His death set off the Malaita massacre, in which several other colonial officials were killed in a Kwaio attack, which led to a punitive expedition in which many Kwaio were killed or incarcerated in retaliation.

== Life ==
=== Early life ===
Bell was born in Maffra district of Gippsland region of Victoria, Australia, the third son of a migrant from Whaddon (Cambridgeshire) in a family with fifteen children. He was raised by his aunt, but maintained close ties to his father's family nearby. He left school at age fourteen to assist with the family farm work at Tanjil South. He was an excellent athlete, and talented at cricket.

Along with his older brother George (later The Hon Sir George), he enlisted to fight in the Second Boer War in 1899. He served in the 2nd Victorian Mounted Rifles, and participated in the fighting at the Black Reef mine in the Witwatersrand. Returning to the farm after the war, his right hand was accidentally impaled with a pitchfork, necessitating a surgical removed of part of the palm and some fingers. Later he claimed the wound to have been the result of his war experience. The injury prevented him from participating in the First World War and pursuing a military career, as several of his brothers did.

In 1901 or 1902, Bell left Australia to go to Fiji. His first job was on Mango. Later he worked for Brown and Joske, and served as an accountant and later a recruiting agent. Afterwards, he found work as a Government Agent aboard the schooner Clansman, which was involved in the labour trade bringing Solomon Islanders to Fiji. When this recruiting ceased in 1911, he found work in the Solomon Administration's Department of Labour. In his work, he supported the rights and interests of the native people against the exploitative plantation industry, and sought consistent enforcement rules and regulations.

=== District Officer ===
When the First World War broke out, many colonial officials went to serve on the war front, and in October 1915 Bell was asked to assume the post of Acting District Officer of Malaita, which he accepted with reluctance. He began by noting that the largest hindrance to peace and the rule of law on the island was the endemic blood feuding, and he tried to arrest murderers before they could be killed by family members of the victims in revenge, or ramos (professional killers) seeking proffered blood money. Early in his work, the Acting Resident Commissioner in Tulagi, F.J. Barnett, warned Bell about the dangers of punitive expeditions and interference in native affairs, and fired Bell who sought to have him forced from government work due to his obstinacy on this point. Bell was reinstated, and Barnett left soon afterward, and the new Resident Commissioner Charles Rufus Marshall Workman was much more supportive of his work and recommended he be confirmed as District Officer.

By 1918, Bell had acquired a respect among the Malaitans that no European had ever had, especially in northern areas and those near the coast. Though most of the mountainous interior and the eastern coast remained defiant, he was increasingly viewed as having the characteristics of a Malaitan strongman, and an aura of supernatural power. However, Bell himself was soon drawn into the blood feuding: relatives of criminals he had arrested who were later tried and hanged offered bounties for his death. Later, in his dealings with the adversaries, Bell became increasingly overbearing and aggressive, and was prone to intimidation and, when he lost his temper, violence to establish personal dominance.

He replaced most of his constabulary, previously largely from the Western Solomons or even Tanna, with Malaitans familiar with local custom and more likely to be taken seriously by strongmen, but who were strongly loyal to him and devoted to duty. He looked ahead to the advantages law and order would provide, in infrastructure, sanitation, and economic development. He continued to be critical of plantation interests, and found many missionaries hypocritical and set on destroying a cultural heritage they did not understand.

In 1920 the protectorate authorities decided to introduce an annual native head tax, in order to raise revenue and encourage natives to adopt a wage labour system and a cash economy. Bell, who was strongly opposed to such a tax because of the scarcity of currency on the island and the idea that it would interfere with his efforts to disarm and pacify the island, managed to delay the imposition of the tax on Malaita until 1923, and have its rate substantially lower than on other islands. He collected the first round of taxes in late 1923 and early 1924, gathering a little more than £3,000. He sought a furlough following the tax collection, and went off for nine months to attend to his worsening sciatica and other health issues.

Bell returned to Malaita in April 1925, and immediately set out to finish the annual tax collection, which had been started in his absence. In that year, he found a great deal of resentment about the tax, exacerbated from a speech the Resident Commissioner R. R. Kane had made in his absence, extolling the benefits that government had brought. In truth, Malaitans had little to show in government expenditures, and Bell pressed the protectorate authorities to provide a Medical Officer and other return for the tax money. The 1925 tax collection was the most contentious, and in backing from direct confrontation, he strengthened the position of those promoting defiance. The 1926 collection, though resentment seethed, did not have any serious confrontations. However, for the 1927 round, Bell planned to confiscate the remaining rifles as well, encouraging defiance.

=== Death ===
In the course of tax collection in 1925, a plot to kill Bell was hatched by a Baegu in the northeast of Malaita, although it was not acted on. In September 1927, various Kwaio, led by a ramo named Basiana, planned an attack on Bell and his party when they came for the tax collection. They attempted to recruit plotters by advancing their grievances against Bell and the government, especially the empowerment of Christian coastal groups that were seen to dishonour their ancestors. Word of the plot spread across the island, and Bell and his police were warned well in advance. However, understanding local mores, Bell decided the best approach was to make a show of strength, and thereby command the respect of the locals and achieve their compliance. Collecting taxes offshore or calling residents up one by one, as some of his deputies urged, would reveal weakness.

On Monday 3 October 1927 Bell moored his ship the Auki in Singalagu harbour, and set up the usual tax collection operation at the house in the glen nearby. At dawn on Tuesday, Basiana and the other warriors made their way to the tax collection site. When the warriors arrived, Bell announced his peaceful intentions and invited them to pay their taxes. Basiana paid his tax first and went back to the edge of the clearing where his pouch was. Then he took the barrel of his rifle, concealed it between his arm and body, and slipped back into the line. He worked his way to the front of the line, and while Bell was writing on the tax roll, he took the rifle, raised it high and smashed it into his skull with such force that Bell's head virtually exploded. His death became the first of the Malaita massacre, which ultimately took the lives of nearly 100 people, in both the attack and a retributive raid, and had serious consequences for Kwaio society.
