= Kwaio people =

Kwaio
Total population
- 13,200 in 1999

Regions with significant populations
- Solomon Islands: 13,200

Languages
- Kwaio

Religion
- traditional ancestor worship

Related ethnic groups
- Other Malaitan peoples

Kwaio is an ethnic group found in central Malaita, in the Solomon Islands. According to Ethnologue, they numbered 13,249 in 1999. Much of what is known about the Kwaio is due to the work of the anthropologist Roger M. Keesing, who lived among them starting in the 1960s.

Their main mode of economic activity was traditionally subsistence farming of taro, which could be planted and harvested continuously in swidden agriculture. Other important crops include yams and plantains. Birds, insects, fish, and cuscus were occasional additions to what was mainly a vegetarian diet. Taro production suffered in a severe blight in the 1950s, and has been replaced by the sweet potato, a food of much lower prestige.

Kwaio settlement was traditionally in very small settlements dotted close together. Missionary activity, predominantly in coastal areas, has encouraged the growth of larger settlements.

According to oral tradition, the land was first cleared 1200 to 2000 years ago. The tracts cleared at this time are marked by shrines, and in effect established title for the clans descended agnatically from these ancestors. In practice, other non-agnatic descendants have secondary rights to the land, which may be strengthened by residence, especially during childhood, and participation in the descent groups' affairs. Because people can have claims in several different descent groups, land rights have some degree of flexibility.

Kwaio have been more resistant than other nearby peoples in the continuation of their beliefs. The traditional religion is a form of ancestor worship, which recognizes the power of the deceased to intervene in affairs. There are strict rules regarding taboo (Kwaio: abu), and violations of them must be redressed with sacrifices. One example of a powerful ancestral force is La'aka, fear of whom led to the Maasina Ruru movement.

Kwaio were first brought into contact with the outside world in 1868, when two men were taken from their canoe, and then returned bearing steel tools, novelty items, and stories about their experience. Within a small amount of time, many young Kwaio sought the adventures, and were brought to sugarcane plantations in Queensland and on Fiji for their labor. The appearance of steel (replacing rough chert blades) and firearms revolutionized the Kwaio way of life, as leisure time was greatly increased by the new tools and blood feuds escalated. Kwaio also attempted to avenge the deaths of those who died overseas, and they earned a reputation as a fierce and dangerous group. Missionaries from the South Seas Evangelical Church were brought to support those in Queensland who had become Christians there, and enclaves were established in the lowlands.

The efforts of the Australian District Officer William R. Bell were to pacify the area and establish means to collect a head tax, and capitulate to the British colonial regime. On his fifth annual tax collection, in October 1927, he was killed, along with one other white man and 13 Solomon Islanders in his charge. A massive punitive expedition, known as the Malaita massacre ensued; at least 60 people were killed, and nearly 200 detained in Tulagi (the then capital), where 30 further died from dysentery and other problems. Furthermore, relatives of the slain Solomon Islanders sought spiritual revenge by the deliberate desecration of sacred sites and objects, which is seen by surviving elders as the origin of many of the struggles the people have suffered in recent times, including epidemics, the breakdown of traditional morality, and the Taro leaf blight. Kwaio culture was greatly transformed, but after several years was able to regain its traditional practices and social structure. However, there is more personal independence for younger people and blood feuding is no longer practiced.
