= Solomon Islands =

Island country in Melanesia

Solomon Islands Solomon Aelan (Pijin)
- Flag Coat of arms
- Motto: "To Lead is to Serve"
- Anthem: "God Save Our Solomon Islands"
- Capital and largest city: Honiara; 9°25′55″S 159°57′20″E
- Official language: English
- Lingua franca: Pijin
- Ethnic groups (2016): 95.3% Melanesian; 3.1% Polynesian; 1.2% Micronesian; 0.4% others
- Religion (2016): 97.4% Christianity; 78.6% Protestantism; 19.5% Catholicism; 1.9% other Christian; 1.2% folk religions; 1.4% others / none
- Demonyms: Solomon Islander; Solomonese
- Government: Unitary parliamentary constitutional monarchy
  - Monarch: Charles III
  - Governor-General: David Tiva Kapu
  - Prime Minister: Matthew Wale
- Legislature: National Parliament

Independence from the United Kingdom
  - Declared: 7 July 1978

Area
  - Total: 28,896 km^{2} (11,157 sq mi) (139th)
  - Water (%): 3.2%

Population
  - 2025 estimate: 828,857 (167th)
  - 2019 census: 720,956
  - Density: 28.68/km^{2} (74.3/sq mi) (192nd)
- GDP (PPP): 2024 estimate
  - Total: ▲$1.68 billion
  - Per capita: ▲$2,205.25
- GDP (nominal): 2024 estimate
  - Total: ▲$1.681 billion
  - Per capita: ▲$2,205.25
- Gini (2013): 37.1 medium inequality
- HDI (2023): ▲0.584 medium (156th)
- Currency: Solomon Islands dollar (SBD)
- Time zone: UTC+11 (Solomon Islands Time)
  - Summer (DST): Not observed
- Calling code: +677
- ISO 3166 code: SB
- Internet TLD: .sb

Solomon Islands is an archipelagic country consisting of six major islands and over 1,000 smaller islands in Melanesia, Oceania, to the north-east of Australia. It is adjacent to Bougainville to the west, New Caledonia and Vanuatu to the south-east, Fiji, Tuvalu, and Wallis and Futuna to the east, and the Federated States of Micronesia and Nauru to the north. It has a total area of 28,896 square kilometres (11,157 sq mi), and a population of 828,857 according to official estimates from 2025. Its capital and largest city, Honiara, is located on the largest island, Guadalcanal. The country takes its name from the wider area of the Solomon Islands archipelago, which is a collection of Melanesian islands that also includes the Autonomous Region of Bougainville (currently a part of Papua New Guinea), but excludes the Santa Cruz Islands.

The islands have been settled since at least some time between 30,000 and 28,800 BC, with later waves of migrants, notably the Lapita people, mixing and producing the modern indigenous Solomon Islanders population. In 1568, the Spanish navigator Álvaro de Mendaña was the first European to visit them. Though not named by Mendaña, it is believed that the islands were called "the Solomons" by those who later received word of his voyage and mapped his discovery. Mendaña returned decades later, in 1595, and another Spanish expedition, led by Portuguese navigator Pedro Fernandes de Queirós, visited the Solomons in 1606.

In June 1893, Captain Herbert Gibson of HMS Curacoa declared the southern Solomon Islands a British protectorate. During World War II, the Solomon Islands campaign (1942–1945) saw fierce fighting between the United States, British Imperial forces, and the Empire of Japan, including the Battle of Guadalcanal.

The official name of the then-British administration was changed from the "British Solomon Islands Protectorate" to "the Solomon Islands" in 1975, and self-government was achieved the following year. Independence was obtained, and the name changed to just "Solomon Islands" (without the definite article), in 1978. At independence, Solomon Islands became a constitutional monarchy. The King of Solomon Islands is Charles III, who is represented in the country by a governor-general appointed on the advice of the prime minister.

== Name ==
In 1568, the Spanish navigator Álvaro de Mendaña was the first European to visit the Solomon Islands archipelago but did not name the archipelago at that time, only certain individual islands. Though not named by Mendaña, the islands were subsequently referred to as Islas Salomón (Solomon Islands) by others following reports of his voyage optimistically conflated with stories of the wealthy biblical King Solomon, believing them to be the Bible-mentioned city of Ophir. During most of the colonial period, the territory's official name was the "British Solomon Islands Protectorate" until independence in 1978, when it was changed to "Solomon Islands" as defined in the Constitution of Solomon Islands and as a Commonwealth realm under this name.

The definite article, "the", has not been part of the country's official name since independence but remains for all references to the area before independence and is sometimes used, both within and outside the country. Colloquially, the islands are referred to simply as "the Solomons".

== History ==
=== Prehistory ===
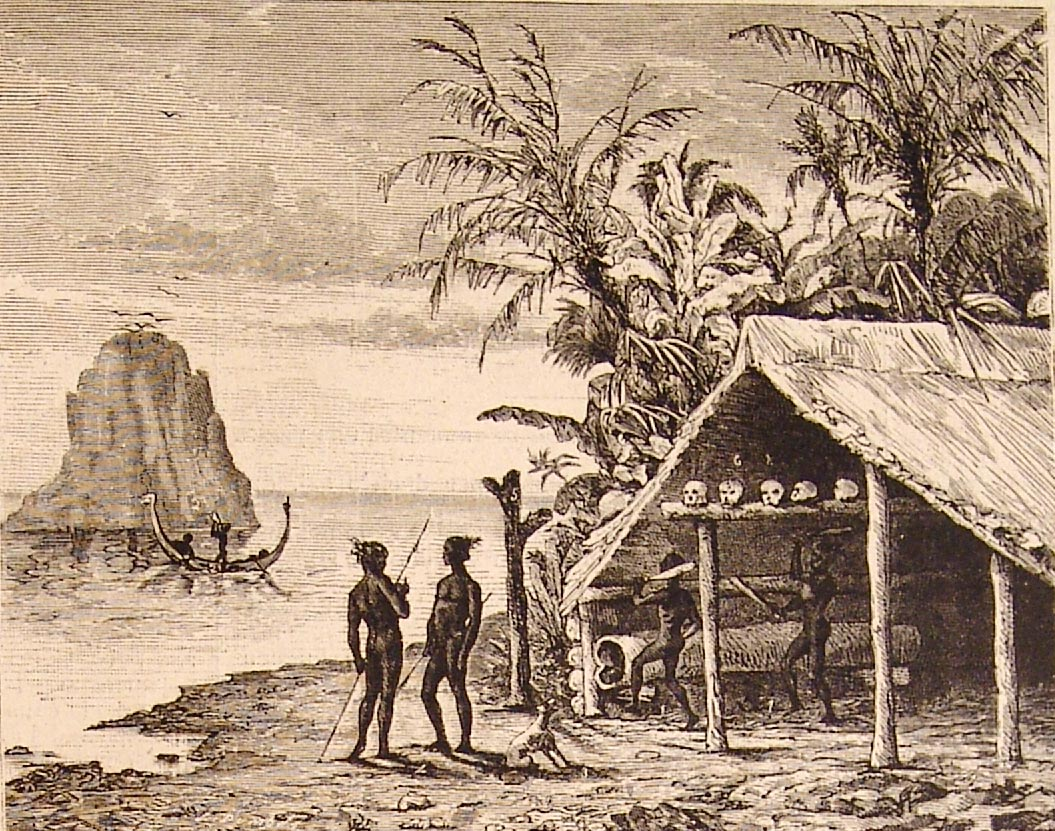
Solomon Islanders

The Solomons were first settled by people coming from the Bismarck Islands and New Guinea during the Pleistocene era c. 30,000–28,000 BC, based on archaeological evidence found at Kilu Cave on Buka Island in the Autonomous Region of Bougainville, Papua New Guinea. At this point sea levels were lower and Buka and Bougainville were physically joined to the southern Solomons in one landmass ("Greater Bougainville"), though it is unclear precisely how far south these early settlers spread as no other archaeological sites from this period have been found. As sea levels rose as the Ice Age ended c. 4000–3500 BC, the Greater Bougainville landmass split into the numerous islands that exist today. Evidence of later human settlements dating to c. 4500–2500 BC have been found at Poha Cave and Vatuluma Posovi Cave on Guadalcanal. The ethnic identity of these early peoples is unclear, though it is thought that the speakers of the Central Solomon languages (a self-contained language family unrelated to other languages spoken in the Solomons) likely represent the descendants of these earlier settlers.

From c. 1200–800 BC, Austronesian Lapita people began arriving from the Bismarcks with their characteristic ceramics. Evidence for their presence has been found across the Solomon archipelago, as well at the Santa Cruz Islands in the south-east, with different islands being settled at different times. Linguistic and genetic evidence suggests that the Lapita people "leap-frogged" the already inhabited main Solomon Islands and settled first on the Santa Cruz group, with later back-migrations bringing their culture to the main group. These peoples mixed with the native Solomon Islanders and over time their languages became dominant, with most of the 60–70 languages spoken there belonging to the Oceanic branch of the Austronesian language family. Then, as now, communities tended to exist in small villages practising subsistence agriculture, though extensive inter-island trade networks existed. Numerous ancient burial sites and other evidence of permanent settlements have been found from the period AD 1000–1500 throughout the islands, one of the most prominent examples being the Roviana cultural complex centred on the islands off the southern coast of New Georgia, where a large number of megalithic shrines and other structures were constructed in the 13th century. The people of Solomon Islands were notorious for headhunting and cannibalism before the arrival of the Europeans.

=== Arrival of Europeans (1568–1886) ===
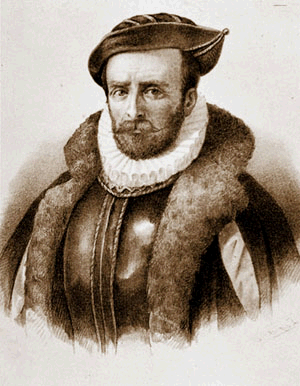
Álvaro de Mendaña de Neira (1542–1595), the first European to sight the Solomons

The first European to visit the islands was the Spanish navigator Álvaro de Mendaña de Neira, sailing from Peru in 1568. Landing on Santa Isabel on 7 February, Mendaña explored several of the other islands including Makira, Guadalcanal and Malaita. Relations with the native Solomon Islanders were initially cordial, although they often soured as time went by. As a result, Mendaña returned to Peru in August 1568. He returned to the Solomons with a larger crew on a second voyage in 1595, aiming to colonise the islands. They landed on Nendö in the Santa Cruz Islands and established a small settlement at Gracioso Bay. However, the settlement failed due to poor relations with the native peoples and epidemics of disease amongst the Spanish which caused numerous deaths, with Mendaña himself dying in October. The new commander Pedro Fernandes de Queirós thus decided to abandon the settlement and they sailed north to the Spanish territory of the Philippines. Queirós later returned to the area in 1606, where he sighted Tikopia and Taumako, though this voyage was primarily to Vanuatu in the search of Terra Australis.

Save for Abel Tasman's sighting of the remote Ontong Java Atoll in 1648, no European sailed to the Solomons again until 1767, when the British explorer Philip Carteret sailed by the Santa Cruz Islands, Malaita, and, continuing further north, Bougainville and the Bismarck Islands. French explorers also reached the Solomons, with Louis Antoine de Bougainville naming Choiseul in 1768 and Jean-François de Surville exploring the islands in 1769. In 1788 John Shortland, captaining a supply ship for Britain's new Australian colony at Botany Bay, sighted the Treasury and Shortland Islands. That same year the French explorer Jean-François de La Pérouse was wrecked on Vanikoro; a rescue expedition led by Bruni d'Entrecasteaux sailed to Vanikoro but found no trace of La Pérouse. The fate of La Pérouse was not confirmed until 1826, when the English merchant Peter Dillon visited Tikopia and discovered items belonging to La Pérouse in the possession of the local people, confirmed by the subsequent voyage of Jules Dumont d'Urville in 1828.

Some of the earliest regular foreign visitors to the islands were whaling vessels from Britain, the United States and Australia. They came for food, wood and water from late in the 18th century, establishing a trading relationship with the Solomon Islanders and later taking aboard islanders to serve as crewmen on their ships. Relations between the islanders and visiting seamen were not always good and sometimes there was bloodshed. A knock-on effect of the greater European contact was the spread of diseases to which local peoples had no immunity, as well as a shift in the balance of power between coastal groups, who had access to European weapons and technology, and inland groups who did not. In the second half of the 1800s more traders arrived seeking turtleshells, sea cucumbers, copra and sandalwood, occasionally establishing semi-permanent trading stations. However, initial attempts at more long-term settlement, such as Benjamin Boyd's colony on Guadalcanal in 1851, were unsuccessful.

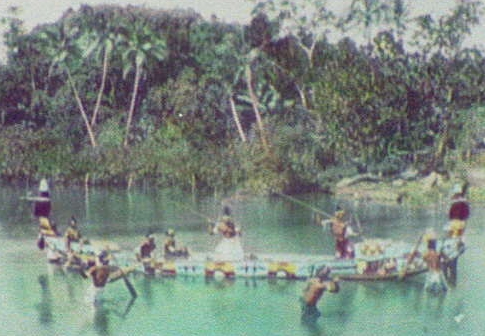
Solomon Island warriors, armed with spears, on board an ornamented war canoe (1895)

Beginning in the 1840s, and accelerating in the 1860s, islanders began to be recruited (or often kidnapped) as labourers for the colonies in Australia, Fiji and Samoa in a process known as "blackbirding". Conditions for workers were often poor and exploitative, and local islanders often violently attacked any Europeans who appeared on their island. The blackbird trade was chronicled by prominent Western writers, such as Joe Melvin and Jack London. Christian missionaries also began visiting the Solomons from the 1840s, beginning with an attempt by French Catholics under Jean-Baptiste Epalle to establish a mission on Santa Isabel, which was abandoned after Epalle was killed by islanders in 1845. Anglican missionaries began arriving from the 1850s, followed by other denominations, over time gaining a large number of converts.

=== Colonial period (1886–1978) ===
==== Establishment of colonial rule ====
In 1884, Germany annexed northeast New Guinea and the Bismarck Archipelago and, in 1886, extended its rule over the North Solomon Islands, covering Bougainville, Buka, Choiseul, Santa Isabel, the Shortlands and Ontong Java atoll. In 1886 Germany and Britain confirmed this arrangement, with the British gaining a "sphere of influence" over the southern Solomons. Germany paid little attention to the islands, with German authorities based in New Guinea not even visiting the area until 1888. The German presence, along with pressure from the missionaries to rein in the excesses of the coercive labour recruitment practices, known as blackbirding, prompted the British to declare a protectorate over the southern Solomons in March 1893, initially encompassing New Georgia, Malaita, Guadalcanal, Makira, Mono Island and the central Nggela Islands.

In April 1896, Charles Morris Woodford was appointed as the acting deputy commissioner in the protectorate, subject to the jurisdiction of the Western Pacific High Commission. The Colonial Office appointed Woodford as the resident commissioner in the Solomon Islands on 17 February 1897. He was directed to control the coercive labour recruitment practices, known as blackbirding, operating in the Solomon Island waters and to stop the illegal trade in firearms. Woodford set up an administrative headquarters on the small island of Tulagi, having proclaimed it the protectorate capital in 1896. and in 1898 and 1899 the Rennell and Bellona Islands, Sikaiana, the Santa Cruz Islands and outlying islands such as Anuta, Fataka, Temotu and Tikopia were added to the protectorate. In 1900, under the terms of the Tripartite Convention of 1899, Germany ceded the Northern Solomon to Britain, minus Buka and Bougainville, the latter becoming part of German New Guinea despite geographically belonging to the Solomons archipelago. This was when the Shortlands, Choiseul, Santa Isabel and Ontong Java became part of the Solomons.

Woodford's underfunded administration struggled to maintain law and order on the remote colony. From the late 1890s until the early 1900s, there were numerous instances of European merchants and colonists being killed by islanders; the British response was to deploy Royal Navy warships to launch punitive expeditions against the villages which were responsible for the murders. Arthur Mahaffy was appointed at the Deputy Commissioner in January 1898. He was based in Gizo, his duties included suppressing headhunting in New Georgia and neighbouring islands.

The British colonial government attempted to encourage the establishment of plantations by colonists; however, by 1902, there were only about 80 European colonists residing on the islands. Attempts at economic development met with mixed results, though Levers Pacific Plantations Ltd., a subsidiary of Lever Brothers, managed to establish a profitable copra plantation industry which employed many islanders. Small scale mining and logging industries were also developed. However, the colony remained something of a backwater, with education, medical and other social services being under the administration of the missionaries. Violence also continued, most notably with the murder of colonial administrator William R. Bell by Basiana of the Kwaio people on Malaita in 1927, as Bell attempted to enforce an unpopular head tax. Several Kwaio were killed in a retaliatory raid, and Basiana and his accomplices executed.

==== World War II ====
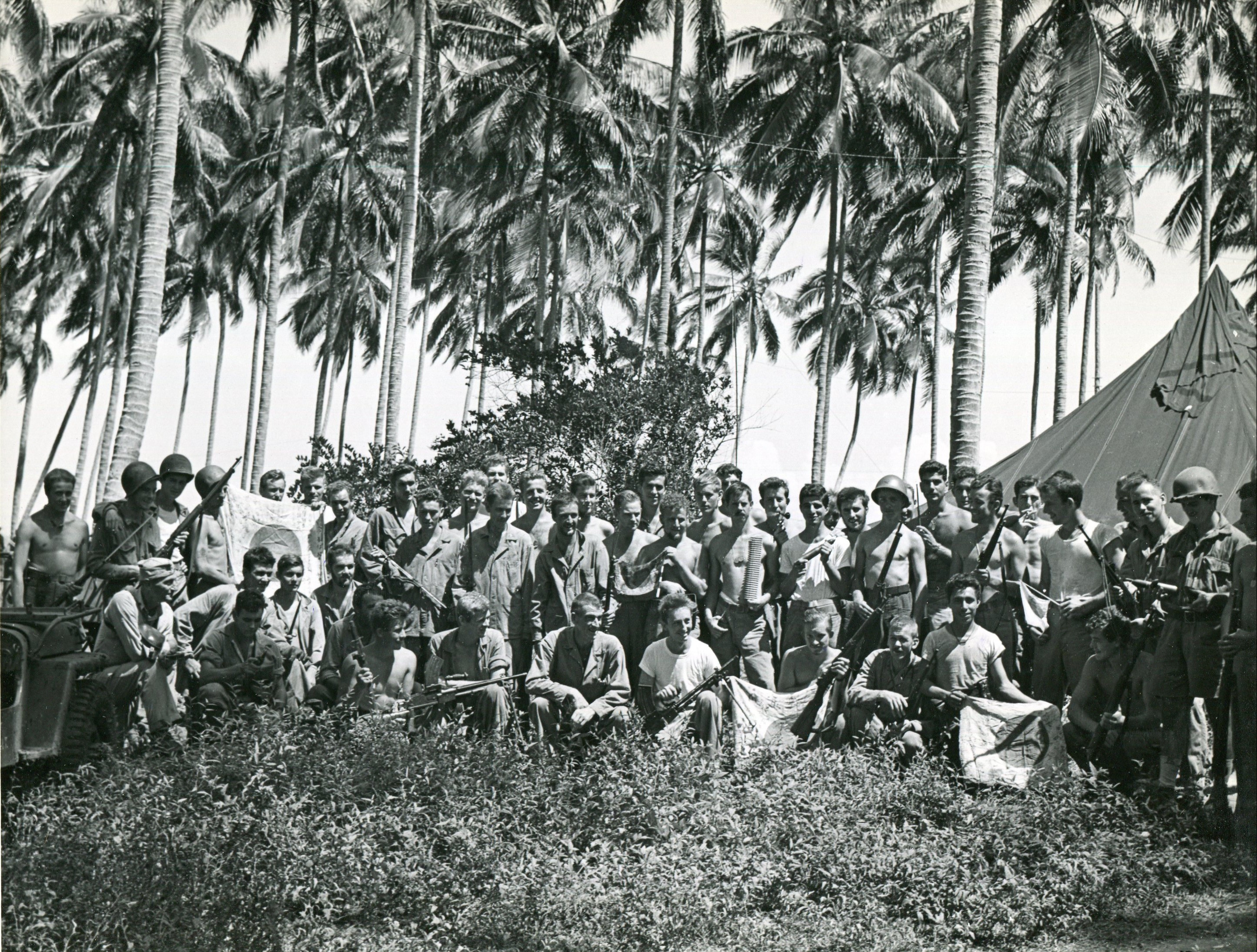
Carlson's Raiders with captured Japanese equipment on Guadalcanal, December 1942

With the outbreak of the Second World War most planters and traders were evacuated to Australia and most cultivation ceased. Some of the most intense fighting of the war occurred in the Solomons.

From 1942 until the end of 1943, the Solomon Islands were the scene of several major land, sea, and air battles between the Allies and the Empire of Japan's armed forces. Following the Japanese attack on Pearl Harbor in 1941, war was declared between Japan and the Allied Powers, and the Japanese, seeking to protect their southern flank, invaded South-East Asia and New Guinea. In May 1942, the Japanese launched Operation Mo, occupying Tulagi and most of the western Solomon Islands, including Guadalcanal where they began work on an airstrip. The British administration had already relocated to Auki, Malaita, and most of the European population had been evacuated to Australia. The Allies counter-invaded Guadalcanal in August 1942, followed by the New Georgia campaign in 1943, both of which were turning points in the Pacific War, stopping and then countering the Japanese advance. The conflict resulted in thousands of Allied, Japanese and civilian deaths, and extensive destruction across the islands. The Solomon Islands Campaign cost the Allies approximately 7,100 men, 29 ships, and 615 aircraft. The Japanese lost 31,000 men, 38 ships, and 683 aircraft.

Coastwatchers from the Solomon Islands played a major role in providing intelligence and rescuing other Allied servicemen. U.S. Admiral William Halsey, the commander of Allied forces during the Battle for Guadalcanal, recognised the coastwatchers' contributions by stating "The coastwatchers saved Guadalcanal and Guadalcanal saved the South Pacific." In addition, around 3,200 men served in the Solomon Islands Labour Corps and some 6,000 enlisted in the British Solomon Islands Protectorate Defence Force, with their exposure to the Americans leading to several social and political transformations. For example, the Americans had extensively developed Honiara, with the capital shifting there from Tulagi in 1952, and the Pijin language was heavily influenced by the communication between Americans and the Islands inhabitants.

The most significant of the Allied Forces' operations against the Japanese Imperial Forces was launched on 7 August 1942, with simultaneous naval bombardments and amphibious landings on the Florida Islands at Tulagi and Red Beach on Guadalcanal.

The Battle of Guadalcanal became an important and bloody campaign fought in the Pacific War as the Allies began to repulse the Japanese expansion. Of strategic importance during the war were the coastwatchers operating in remote locations, often on Japanese held islands, providing early warning and intelligence of Japanese naval, army and aircraft movements during the campaign.

Islanders Biuku Gasa and Eroni Kumana were the first to find the shipwrecked John F. Kennedy and his crew of the PT-109. They suggested writing a rescue message on a coconut, and delivered the coconut by paddling a dugout canoe. The coconut was later kept on Kennedy's desk when he became President of the United States.

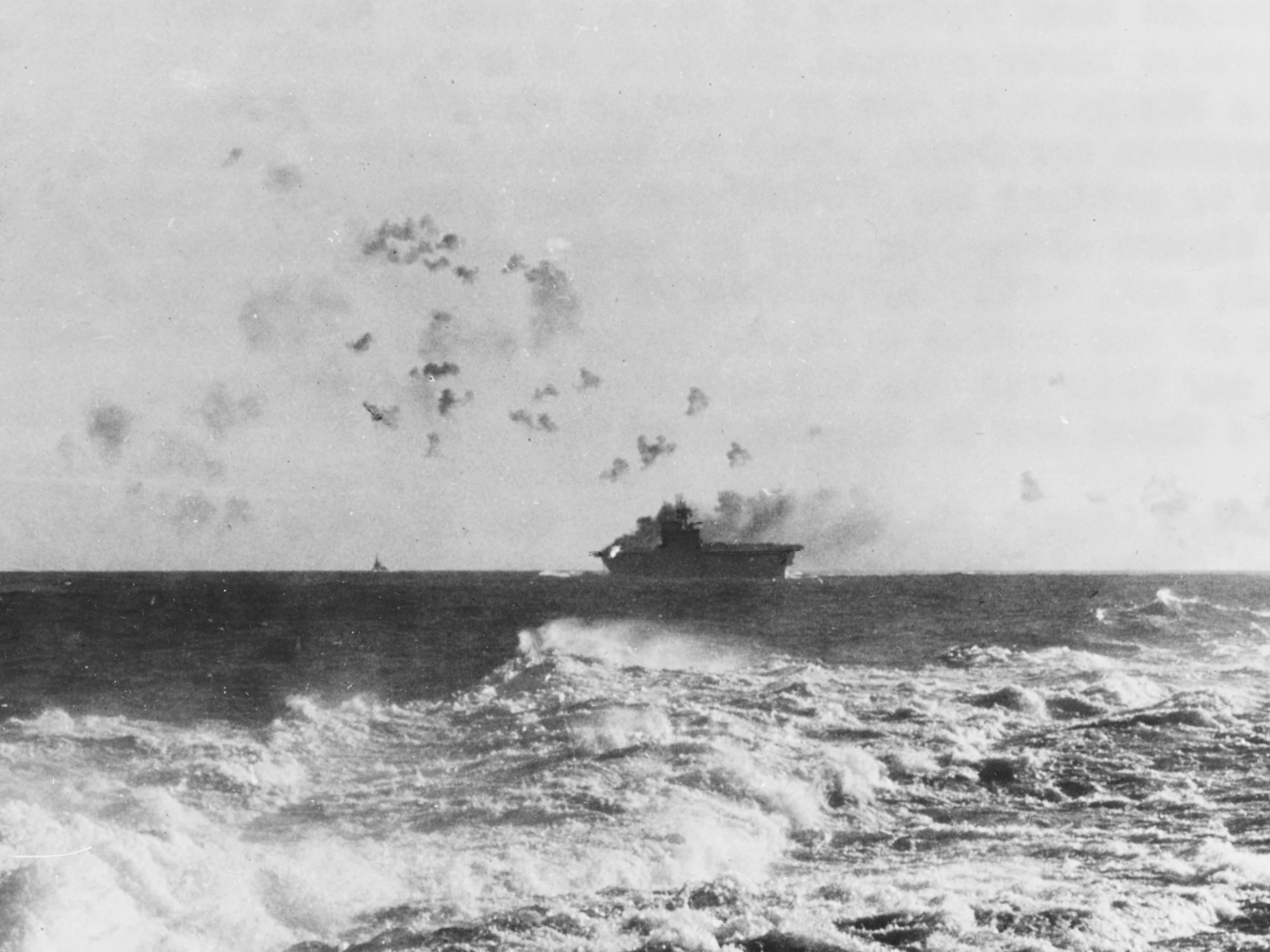
The aircraft carrier USS Enterprise (CV-6) under aerial attack during the Battle of the Eastern Solomons

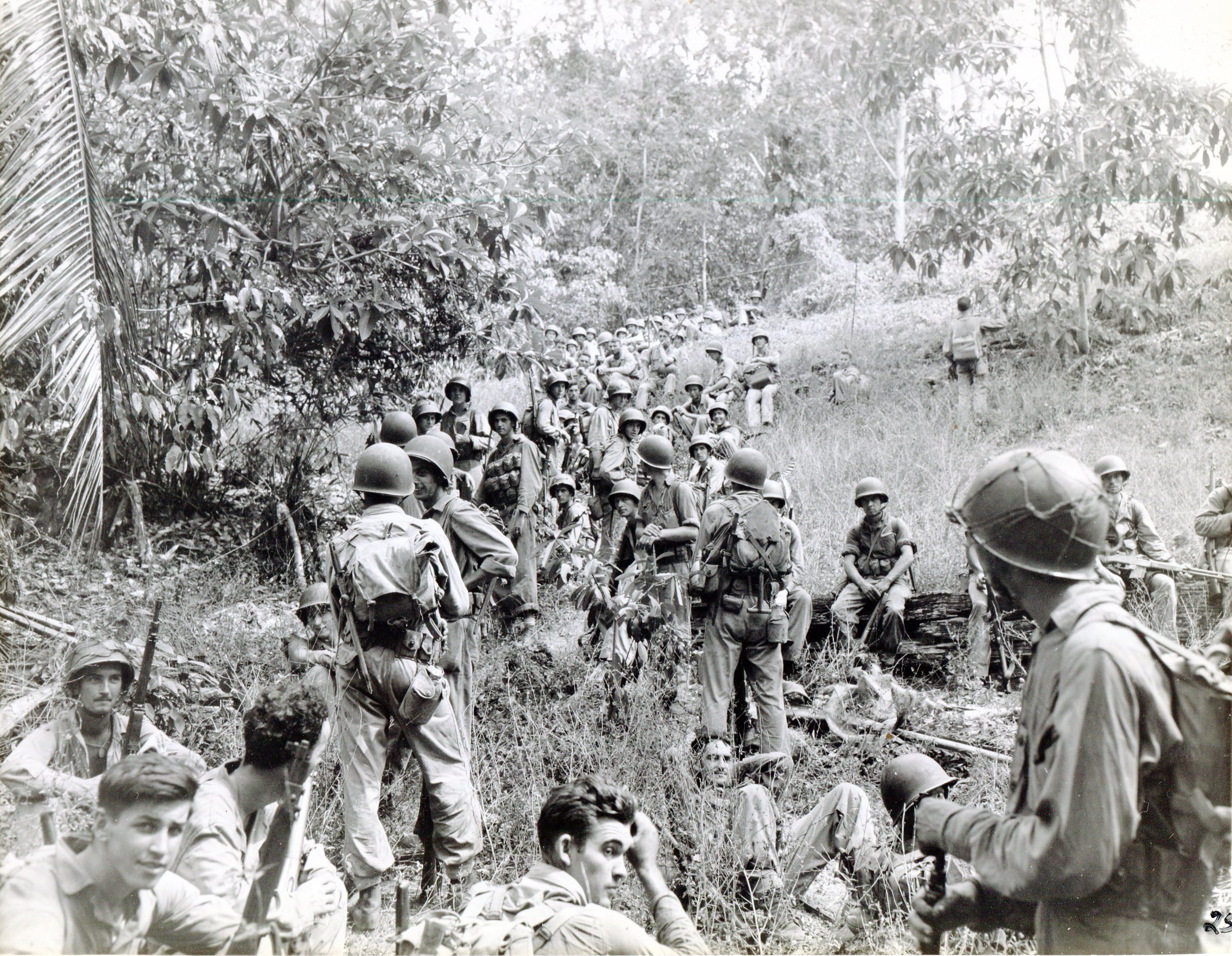
US Marines rest during the 1942 Guadalcanal campaign

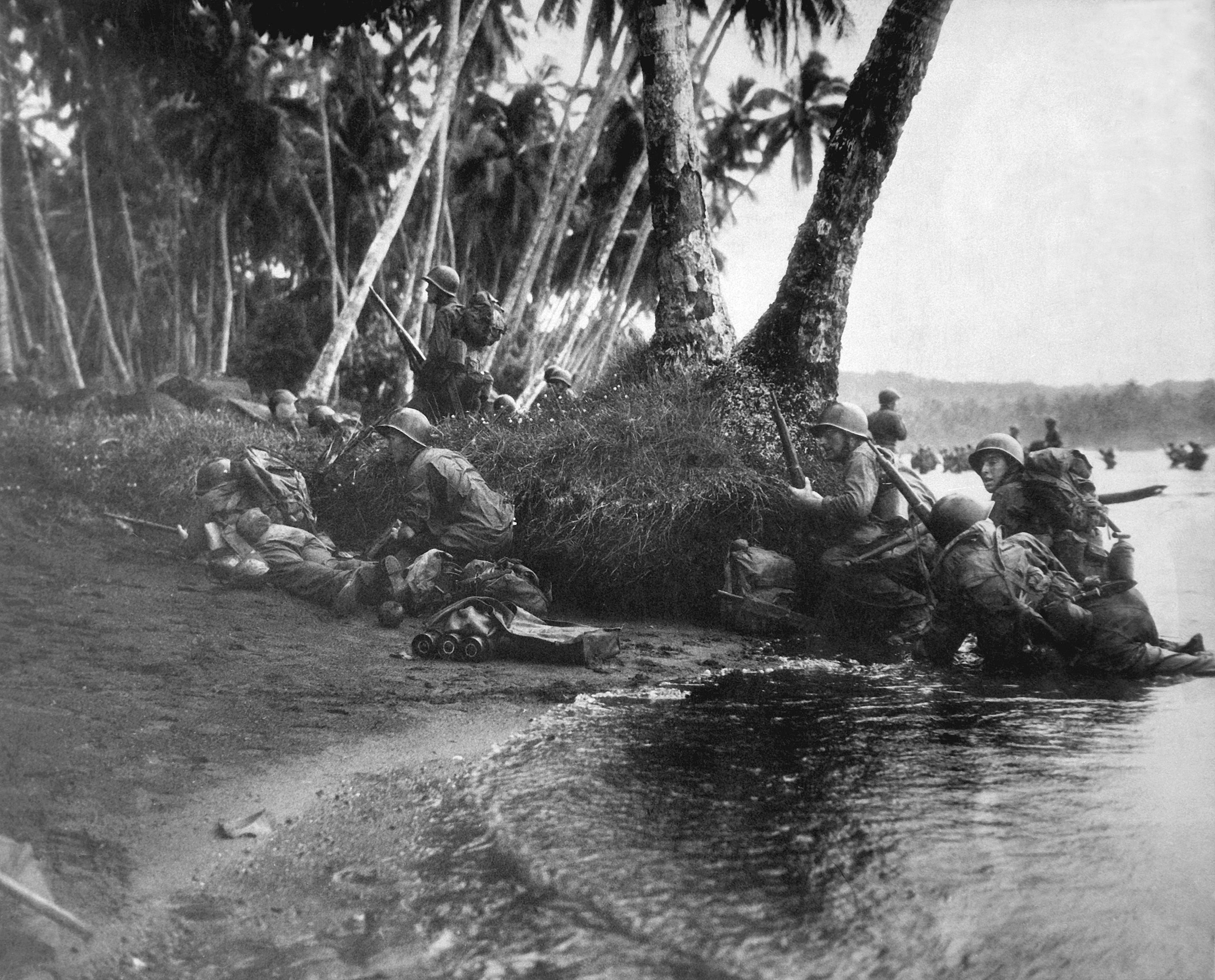
American forces landing at Rendova Island

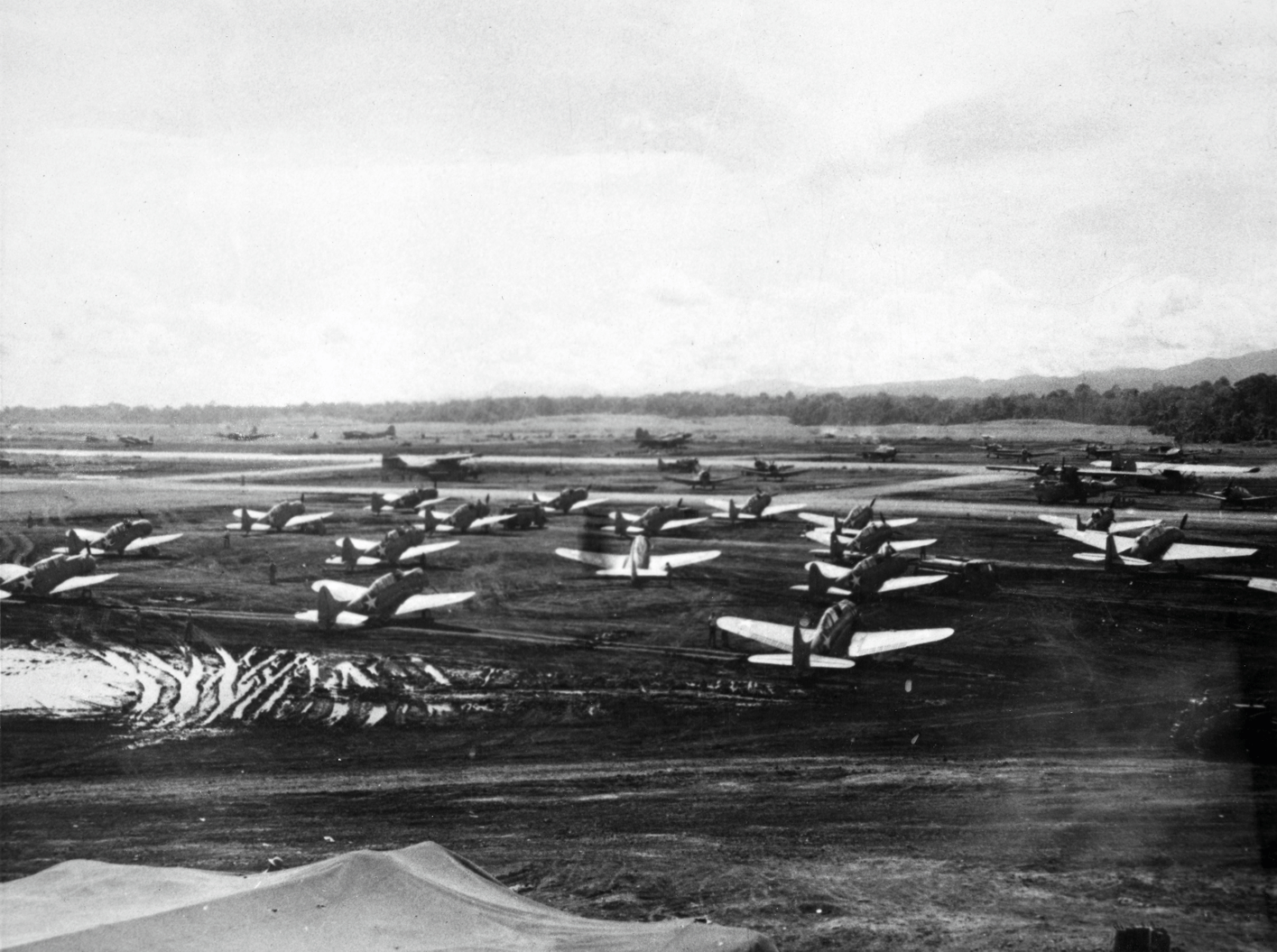
The Cactus Air Force at Henderson Field, Guadalcanal in October 1942

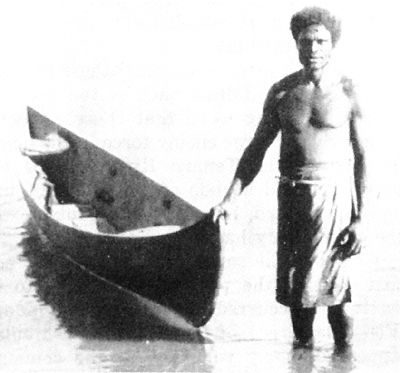
The coastwatcher Jacob C. Vouza on Guadalcanal

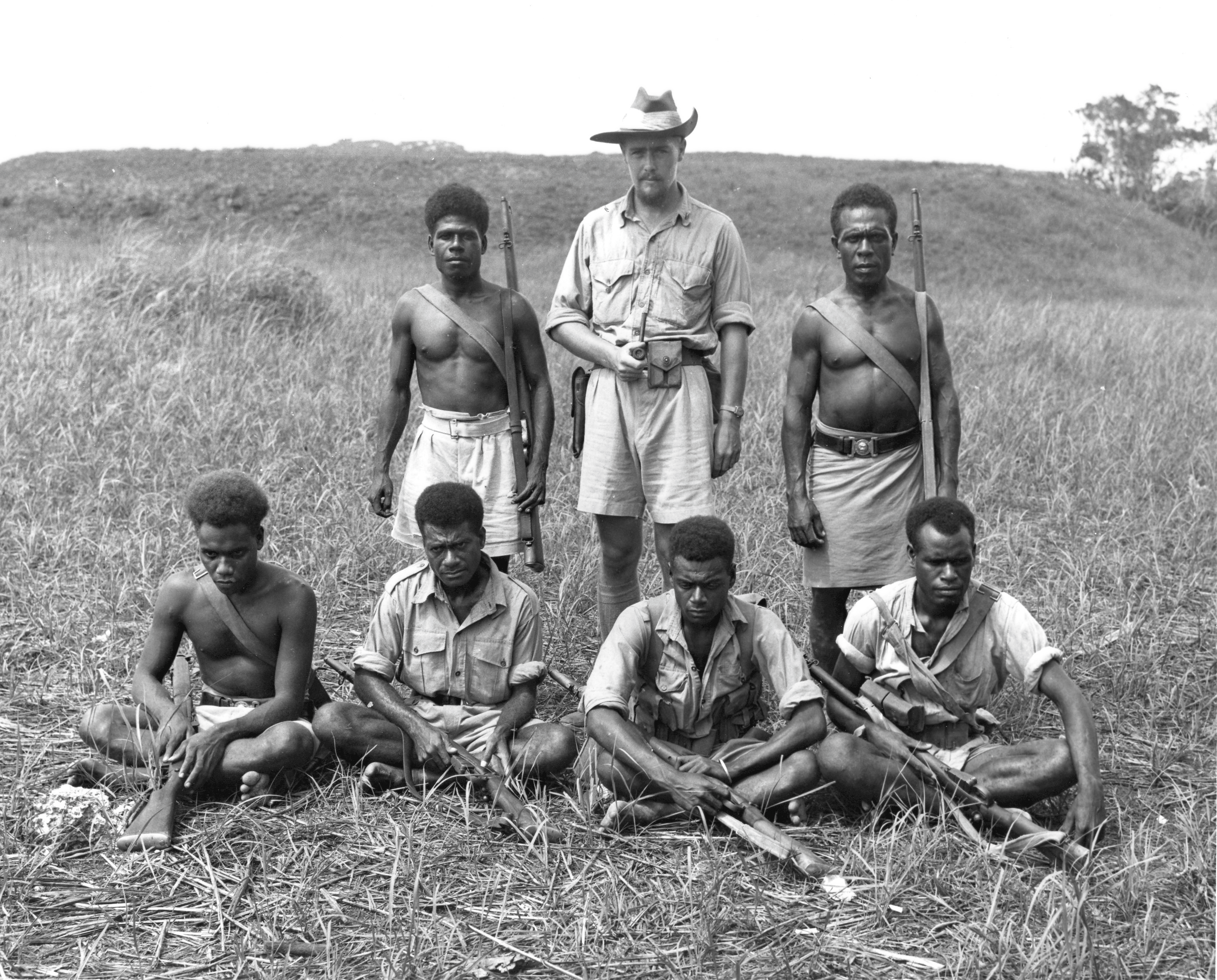
Members of the British Solomon Islands Protectorate Defence Force in 1943

==== Post-war period and the lead-up to independence ====
In 1943–44 the Malaita-based chief Aliki Nono'ohimae had founded the Maasina Rule movement (also called the Native Council Movement, literally "Brotherhood Rule"), and was later joined by another chief, Hoasihau. Their aims were to improve the economic well-being of native Solomon Islanders, gain greater autonomy and to act as a liaison between Islanders and the colonial administration. The movement was especially popular with ex-Labour Corp members and after the war its numbers swelled, with the movement spreading to other islands. Alarmed at the growth of the movement, the British launched "Operation De-Louse" in 1947–8 and arrested most of the Maasina leaders. Malaitans then organised a campaign of civil disobedience, prompting mass arrests. In 1950 a new Resident Commissioner, Henry Gregory-Smith, arrived and released the leaders of the movement, though the disobedience campaign continued. In 1952 new High Commissioner (later Governor) Robert Stanley met with leaders of the movement and agreed to the creation of an island council. In late 1952 Stanley formally moved the capital of the territory to Honiara. In the early 1950s the possibility of transferring sovereignty of the islands to Australia was discussed by the British and Australian governments; however, the Australians were reluctant to accept the financial burden of administering the territory and the idea was shelved.

With decolonisation sweeping the colonial world, and Britain no longer willing (or able) to bear the financial burdens of the Empire, the colonial authorities sought to prepare the Solomons for self-governance. Appointed Executive and Legislative Councils were established in 1960, with a degree of elected Solomon Islander representation introduced in 1964 and then extended in 1967. A new constitution was drawn up in 1970 which merged the two Councils into one Governing Council, though the British Governor still retained extensive powers. Discontent with this prompted the creation of a new constitution in 1974 which reduced much of the Governor's remaining powers and created the post of Chief Minister, first held by Solomon Mamaloni. Full self-government for the territory was achieved in 1976, a year after the independence of neighbouring Papua New Guinea from Australia. Meanwhile, discontent grew in the Western islands, with many fearing marginalisation in a future Honiara- or Malaita-dominated state, prompting the formation of the Western Breakaway Movement. A conference held in London in 1977 agreed that the Solomons would gain full independence the following year. Under the terms of the Solomon Islands Act 1978 the country was annexed to Her Majesty's dominions and granted independence on 7 July 1978. The first prime minister was Sir Peter Kenilorea of the Solomon Islands United Party (SIUP), with Elizabeth II becoming Queen of Solomon Islands, represented locally by a Governor General.

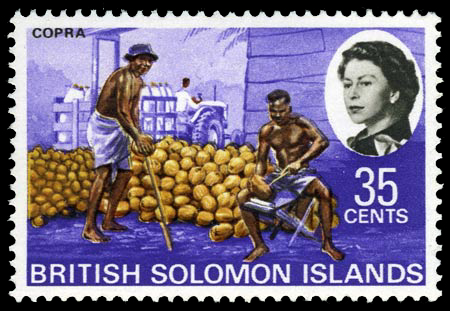
Postage stamp with portrait of Queen Elizabeth II, 1968

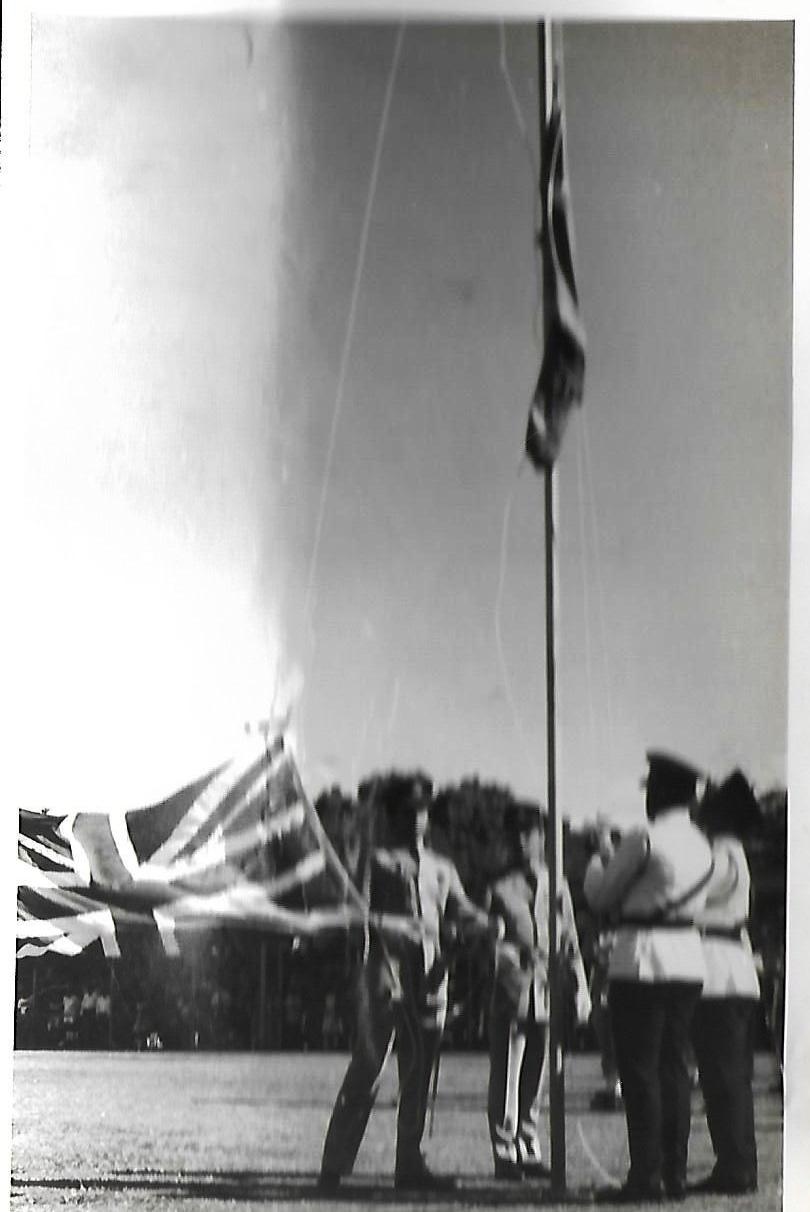
The Solomon Islands Independence Ceremony on 7 July 1978

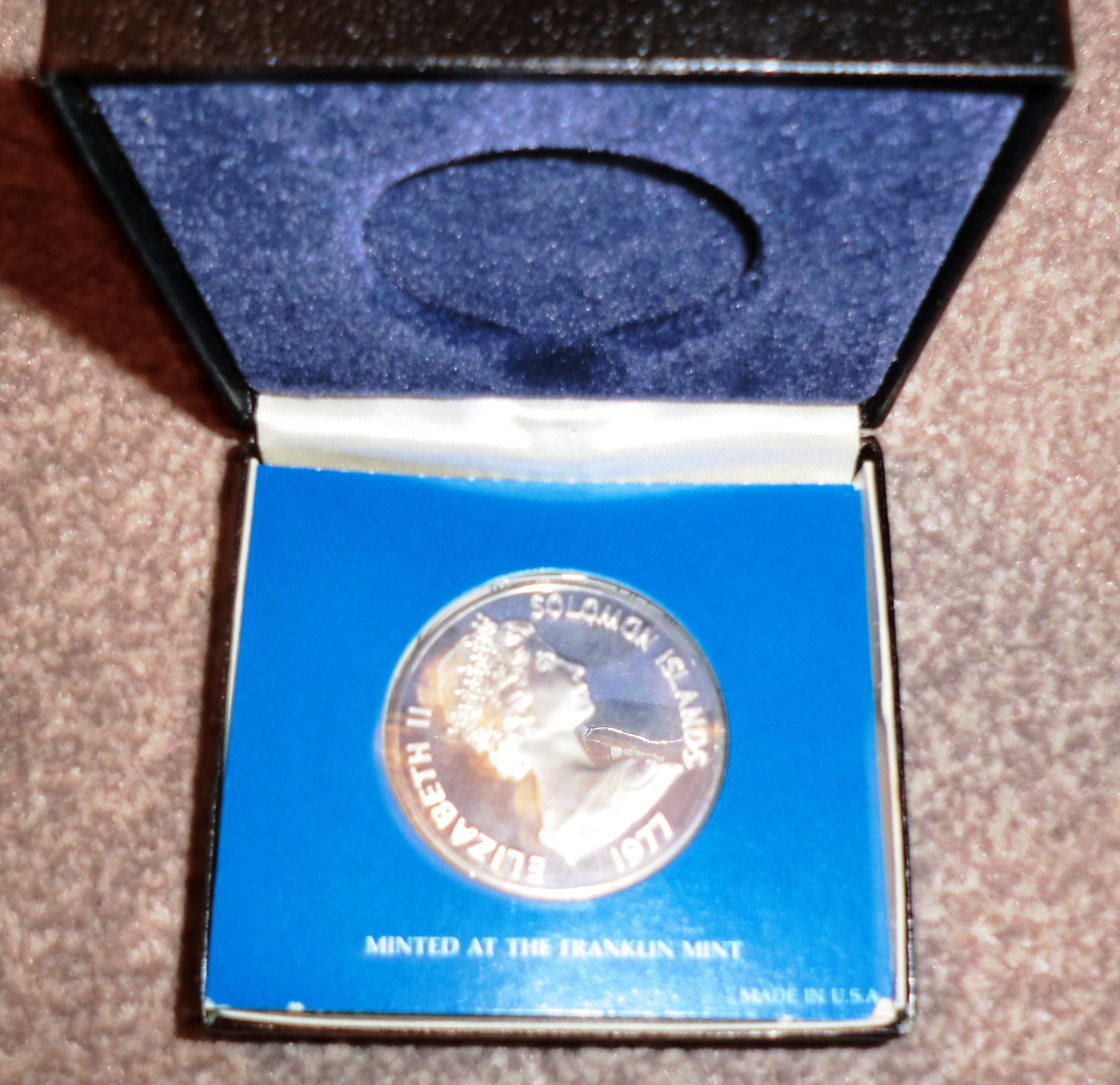
The Five Dollar Proof Coin

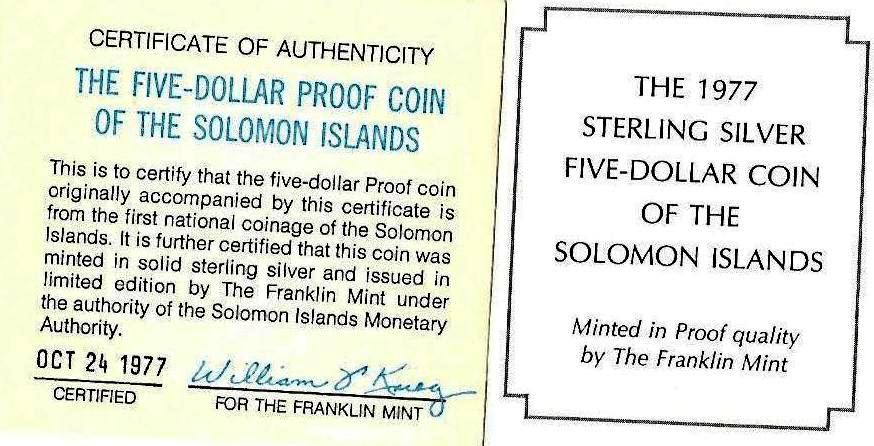
The Five Dollar Proof Coin of the Solomon Islands 24 October 1977

=== Independence era (1978–present) ===
==== Early post-independence years ====
Peter Kenilorea went on to win the 1980 Solomon Islands general election, serving as PM until 1981, when he was replaced by Solomon Mamaloni of the People's Alliance Party (PAP) after a no confidence vote. Mamaloni created the Central Bank and national airline, and pushed for greater autonomy for individual islands of the country. Kenilorea returned to power after winning the 1984 election, though his second term lasted only two years before he was replaced by Ezekiel Alebua following allegations of misuse of French aid money. In 1986 the Solomons helped found the Melanesian Spearhead Group, aimed at fostering cooperation and trade in the region. After winning the 1989 election Mamaloni and the PAP returned to power, with Mamaloni dominating Solomon Islands politics from the early to mid 1990s (save for the one year Premiership of Francis Billy Hilly). Mamaloni made efforts to make the Solomons a republic; however, these were unsuccessful. He also had to deal with the effects of the conflict in neighbouring Bougainville which broke out in 1988, causing many refugees to flee to the Solomons. Tensions arose with Papua New Guinea as PNG forces frequently entered Solomons territory in the pursuit of rebels. The situation calmed down and relations improved following the end of the conflict in 1998. Meanwhile, the country's financial situation continued to deteriorate, with much of the budget coming from the logging industry, often conducted at an unsustainable rate, not helped by Mamaloni's creation of a 'discretionary fund' for use by politicians, which fostered fraud and corruption. Discontent with his rule led to a split in the PAP, and Mamaloni lost the 1993 election to Billy Hilly, though Hilly was later sacked by the Governor-General after a number of defections caused him to lose his majority, allowing Mamaloni to return to power in 1994, where he remained until 1997. Excessive logging, government corruption and unsustainable levels of public spending continued to grow, and public discontent caused Mamaloni to lose the 1997 election. The new prime minister, Bartholomew Ulufa'alu of the Solomon Islands Liberal Party, attempted to enact economic reforms; however, his premiership soon became engulfed in a serious ethnic conflict known as "The Tensions".

==== Ethnic violence (1998–2003) ====
Commonly referred to as the tensions or the ethnic tension, the initial civil unrest was mainly characterised by fighting between the Isatabu Freedom Movement (IFM, also known as the Guadalcanal Revolutionary Army and the Isatabu Freedom Fighters) and the Malaita Eagle Force (as well as the Marau Eagle Force). For many years people from the island of Malaita had been migrating to Honiara and Guadalcanal, attracted primarily by the greater economic opportunities available there. The large influx caused tensions with native Guadalcanal islanders (known as Guales), and in late 1998 the IFM was formed and began a campaign of intimidation and violence towards Malaitan settlers. Thousands of Malaitans subsequently fled back to Malaita or to Honiara, and in mid-1999 the Malaita Eagle Force (MEF) was established to protect Malaitans on Guadalcanal. In late 1999, after several failed attempts at brokering a peace deal, Prime Minister Bartholomew Ulufa'alu declared a four-month state of emergency, and also requested assistance from Australia and New Zealand, but his appeal was rejected. Meanwhile, law and order on Guadalcanal collapsed, with an ethnically divided police unable to assert authority and many of their weapons depots being raided by the militias; by this point the MEF controlled Honiara with the IFM controlling the rest of Guadalacanal.

On 5 June 2000, Ulufa'alu was kidnapped by the MEF who felt that, although he was a Malaitan, he was not doing enough to protect their interests. Ulufa'alu subsequently resigned in exchange for his release. Manasseh Sogavare, who had earlier been Finance Minister in Ulufa'alu's government but had subsequently joined the opposition, was elected as prime minister by 23–21 over the Rev. Leslie Boseto. However, Sogavare's election was immediately shrouded in controversy because six MPs (thought to be supporters of Boseto) were unable to attend parliament for the crucial vote. On 15 October 2000, the Townsville Peace Agreement was signed by the MEF, elements of the IFM, and the Solomon Islands Government. This was closely followed by the Marau Peace agreement in February 2001, signed by the Marau Eagle Force, the IFM, the Guadalcanal Provincial Government, and the Solomon Islands Government. However, a key Guale militant leader, Harold Keke, refused to sign the agreement, causing a split with the Guale groups. Subsequently, Guale signatories to the agreement led by Andrew Te'e joined with the Malaitan-dominated police to form the 'Joint Operations Force'. During the next two years the conflict moved to the remote Weathercoast region of southern Guadalcanal as the Joint Operations unsuccessfully attempted to capture Keke and his group.

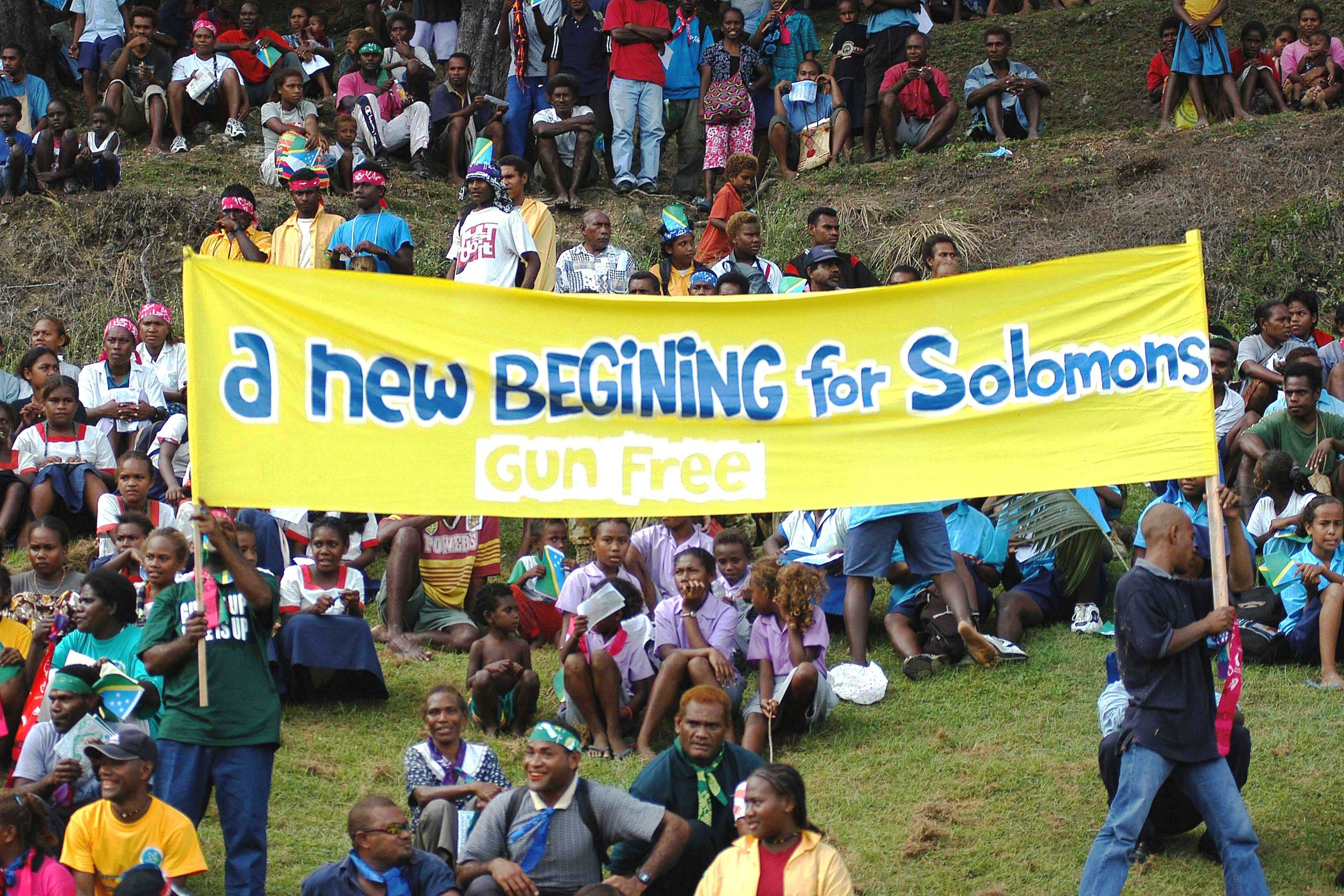
Solomon Islanders at a peace protest in 2003

By early 2001, the economy had collapsed and the government was bankrupt. New elections in December 2001 brought Allan Kemakeza into the Prime Minister's chair, with the support of his People's Alliance Party and the Association of Independent Members. Law and order deteriorated as the nature of the conflict shifted: there was continuing violence on the Weathercoast, whilst militants in Honiara increasingly turned their attention to crime, extortion and banditry. The Department of Finance would often be surrounded by armed men when funding was due to arrive. In December 2002, Finance Minister Laurie Chan resigned after being forced at gunpoint to sign a cheque made out to some of the militants. Conflict also broke out in Western Province between locals and Malaitan settlers. The atmosphere of lawlessness, widespread extortion, and ineffective police prompted a formal request by the Solomon Islands Government for outside help; the request was unanimously supported in Parliament.

In April 2003, seven Christians of the Melanesian Brotherhood – Brother Robin Lindsay and his companions – were killed on the Weather Coast of Guadalcanal by the rebel leader Harold Keke. Six had gone in search of their Brother Nathaniel, who it turns out had already been tortured and killed. During the tensions Nathaniel had befriended the militant group but Harold Keke accused him of being a government spy and he was beaten to death; it was reported that he died singing hymns. They are commemorated by the Anglican church on 24 April.

In July 2003, Australian and Pacific Islands police and troops arrived in Solomon Islands under the auspices of the Australian-led Regional Assistance Mission to Solomon Islands (RAMSI). A sizeable international security contingent of 2,200 police and troops, led by Australia and New Zealand, and with representatives from about 15 other Pacific nations, began arriving the next month under Operation Helpem Fren. The situation improved dramatically, with violence ending and Harold Keke surrendering to the force. Some 200 people had been killed in the conflict. Since this time, some commentators have considered the country a failed state, with the nation having failed to build an inclusive national identity capable of overriding local island and ethnic loyalties. However, other academics argue that, rather than being a 'failed state', it is an unformed state: a state that never consolidated even after decades of independence. Furthermore, some scholars, such as Kabutaulaka (2001) and Dinnen (2002) argue that the 'ethnic conflict' label is an oversimplification.

==== Post-conflict era ====
Kemakeza remained in office until April 2006, when he lost the 2006 Solomon Islands general election and Snyder Rini became PM. However, allegations that Rini had used bribes from Chinese businessmen to buy the votes of members of Parliament led to mass rioting in the capital Honiara, concentrated on the city's Chinatown area. Resentment against the minority Chinese business community led to much of Chinatown in the city being destroyed. China sent chartered aircraft to evacuate Chinese out of the riots. Evacuation of Australian and British citizens was on a much smaller scale. Additional Australian, New Zealand, and Fijian police and troops were dispatched to try to quell the unrest. Rini eventually resigned before facing a motion of no-confidence in Parliament, and Parliament elected Manasseh Sogavare as prime minister.

Sogavare struggled to assert his authority and was also hostile to the Australian presence in the country; after one failed attempt, he was removed in a no confidence vote in 2007 and replaced by Derek Sikua of the Solomon Islands Liberal Party. In 2008, a Truth and Reconciliation Commission was established to examine and help heal the wounds of the 'tension' years. Sikua lost the 2010 Solomon Islands general election to Danny Philip, though after a vote of no-confidence in him following allegations of corruption, Philip was ousted and replaced by Gordon Darcy Lilo. Sogavare returned to power after the 2014 election, and oversaw the withdrawal of RAMSI forces from the country in 2017. Sogavare was ousted in a no-confidence vote in 2017, which saw Rick Houenipwela come to power; however, Sogavare returned to the prime ministership after winning the 2019 election, sparking rioting in Honiara. In 2019, Sogavare announced that the Solomons would be switching recognition from Taiwan to China.

In November 2021, there was mass rioting and unrest. The Solomon Islands Government requested assistance from Australia under the 2017 Bilateral Security Treaty and Australia provided a deployment of Australian Federal Police and Defence Forces.

In March 2022, Solomon Islands signed a memorandum of understanding (MOU) on policing cooperation with China and was also reported to be in the process of concluding a security agreement with China. The agreement with China could allow an ongoing Chinese military and naval presence in the Solomons. A spokesperson for Australia's Department of Foreign Affairs and Trade said that, while "Pacific Island nations have the right to make sovereign decisions", Australia "would be concerned by any actions that destabilise the security of our region". There are similar concerns in New Zealand and the United States. China donated a shipment of replica firearms to the Solomon Islands police for training. Solomon Islands and China signed a security co-operation agreement in April to promote social stability and long-term peace and security in Solomon Islands. The BBC reported that, according to a leaked draft of the agreement verified by the Australian government, Beijing could deploy forces to Solomon Islands "to assist in maintaining social order". Prime Minister Manasseh Sogavare said the pact would not "undermine peace and harmony" in the region and was aimed at protecting the Solomon's internal security situation. China confirmed that the social-order clause had been maintained in the final agreement.

In February 2023, further protests broke out after the Premier of Malaita Province Daniel Suidani was removed from office after a vote of no confidence from the provincial legislature. In May 2024, Jeremiah Manele was elected as Solomon Islands new prime minister to succeed Manasseh Sogavare.

In 2026, Solomon Islands signed an agreement to reestablish the U.S. Peace Corps program. The first new volunteers are expected to arrive in early 2028, initially working in education. Previously, more than 700 volunteers worked in Solomon Islands between 1971 and 2000, primarily in education, health and community economic development. In June 2000, 64 then-active volunteers were withdrawn during the period of ethnic violence.

== Politics ==
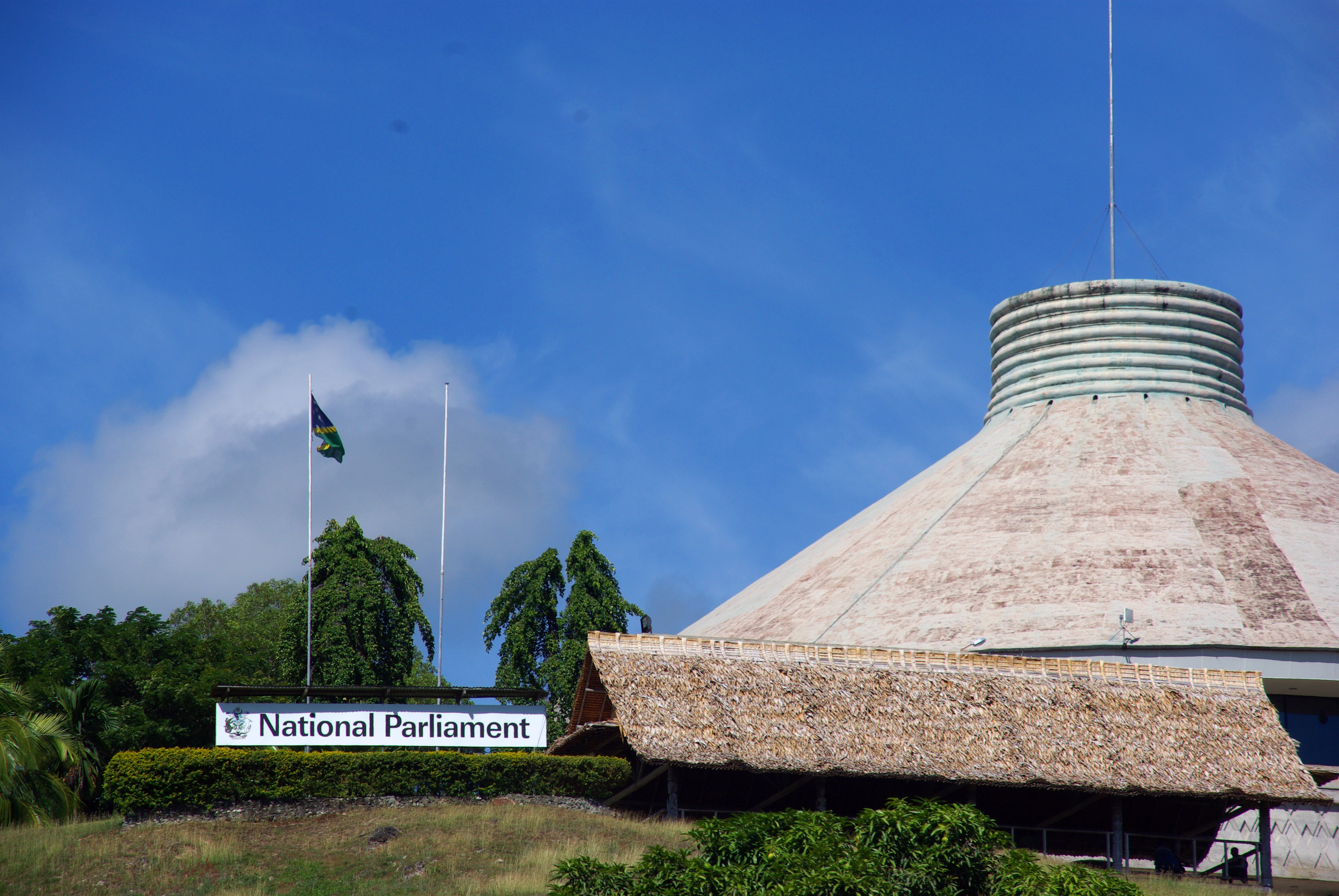
Solomon Islands' National Parliament building was a gift from the United States.

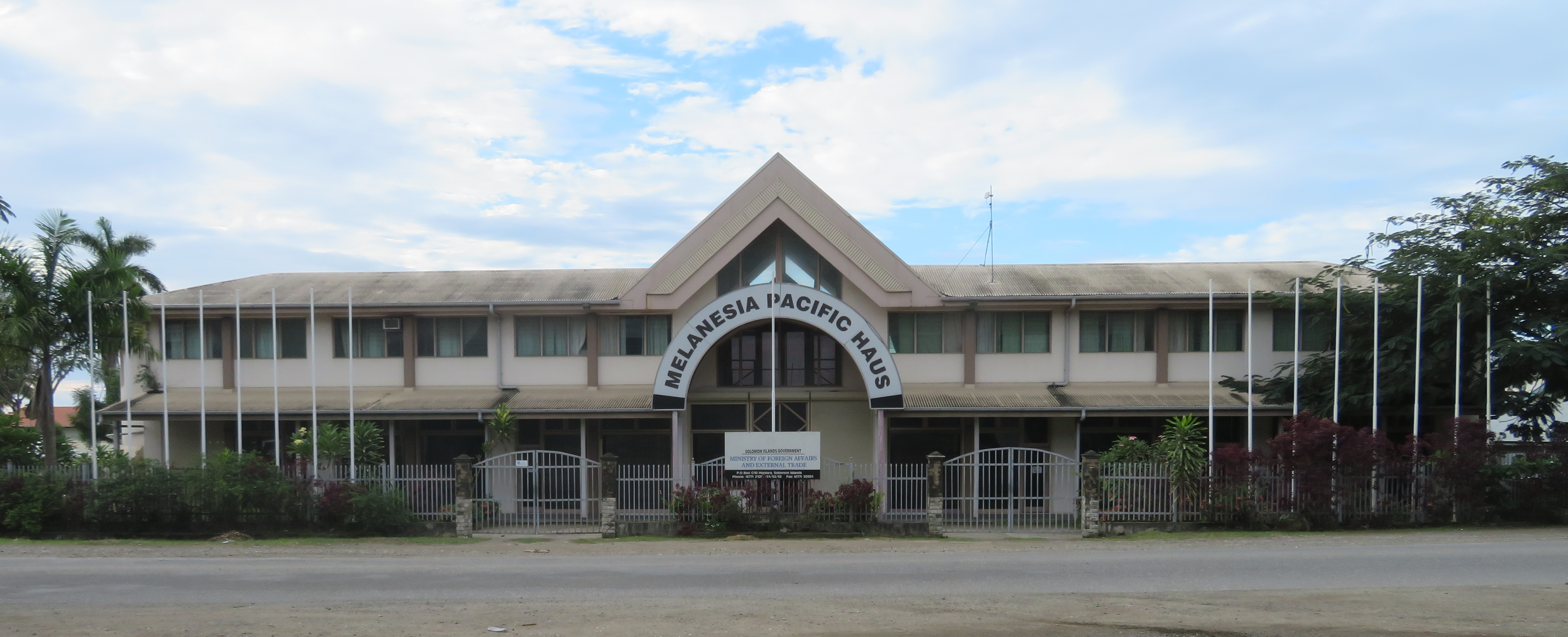
Ministry of the Interior

Solomon Islands is a constitutional monarchy and has a parliamentary system of government. As King of Solomon Islands, Charles III is head of state; he is represented by the Governor-General who is chosen by the Parliament for a five-year term. There is a unicameral parliament of 50 members, elected for four-year terms. However, Parliament may be dissolved by the majority vote of its members before the completion of its term.

Parliamentary representation is based on single-member constituencies. Suffrage is universal for citizens over age 21. The head of government is the prime minister, who is elected by Parliament and chooses the cabinet. Each ministry is headed by a cabinet member, who is assisted by a permanent secretary, a career public servant who directs the staff of the ministry.

Land ownership is reserved for Solomon Islanders. The law provides that resident expatriates, such as the Chinese and Kiribati, may obtain citizenship through naturalisation. Land generally is still held on a family or village basis and may be handed down from mother or father according to local custom. The islanders are reluctant to provide land for nontraditional economic undertakings, and this has resulted in continual disputes over land ownership.

No military forces are maintained by the Solomon Islands (since 1978), although a police force of nearly 500 includes a border protection unit. The police are also responsible for fire service, disaster relief, and maritime surveillance. The police force is headed by a commissioner, appointed by the governor-general and responsible to the prime minister. On 27 December 2006, the Solomon Islands government took steps to prevent the country's Australian police chief from returning to the Pacific nation. On 12 January 2007, Australia replaced its top diplomat expelled from Solomon Islands for political interference in a conciliatory move aimed at easing a four-month dispute between the two countries.

On 13 December 2007, Prime Minister Manasseh Sogavare was toppled by a vote of no confidence in Parliament, following the defection of five ministers to the opposition. It was the first time a prime minister had lost office in this way in Solomon Islands. On 20 December, the parliament elected the opposition's candidate (and former Minister for Education) Derek Sikua as prime minister in a vote of 32 to 15. In April 2019, Manasseh Sogavare was elected as prime minister for the fourth time, causing protests and demonstrations against the decision. The protest resulted in more than 30 protesters being detained. In May 2024, Jeremiah Manele was elected as Solomon Islands new prime minister following the 2024 National General Election.

=== Judiciary ===
The Governor-General appoints the Chief Justice of the Supreme Court on the advice of the Prime Minister and the Leader of the Opposition. The Governor-General appoints the other justices with the advice of a judicial commission. The current Chief Justice is Sir Albert Palmer.

Since November 2023, Sir John Baptist Muria has served as the President of the Court of Appeal of Solomon Islands. Sir John Baptist Muria previously served as the former Chief Justice of Solomon Islands.

=== Foreign relations ===
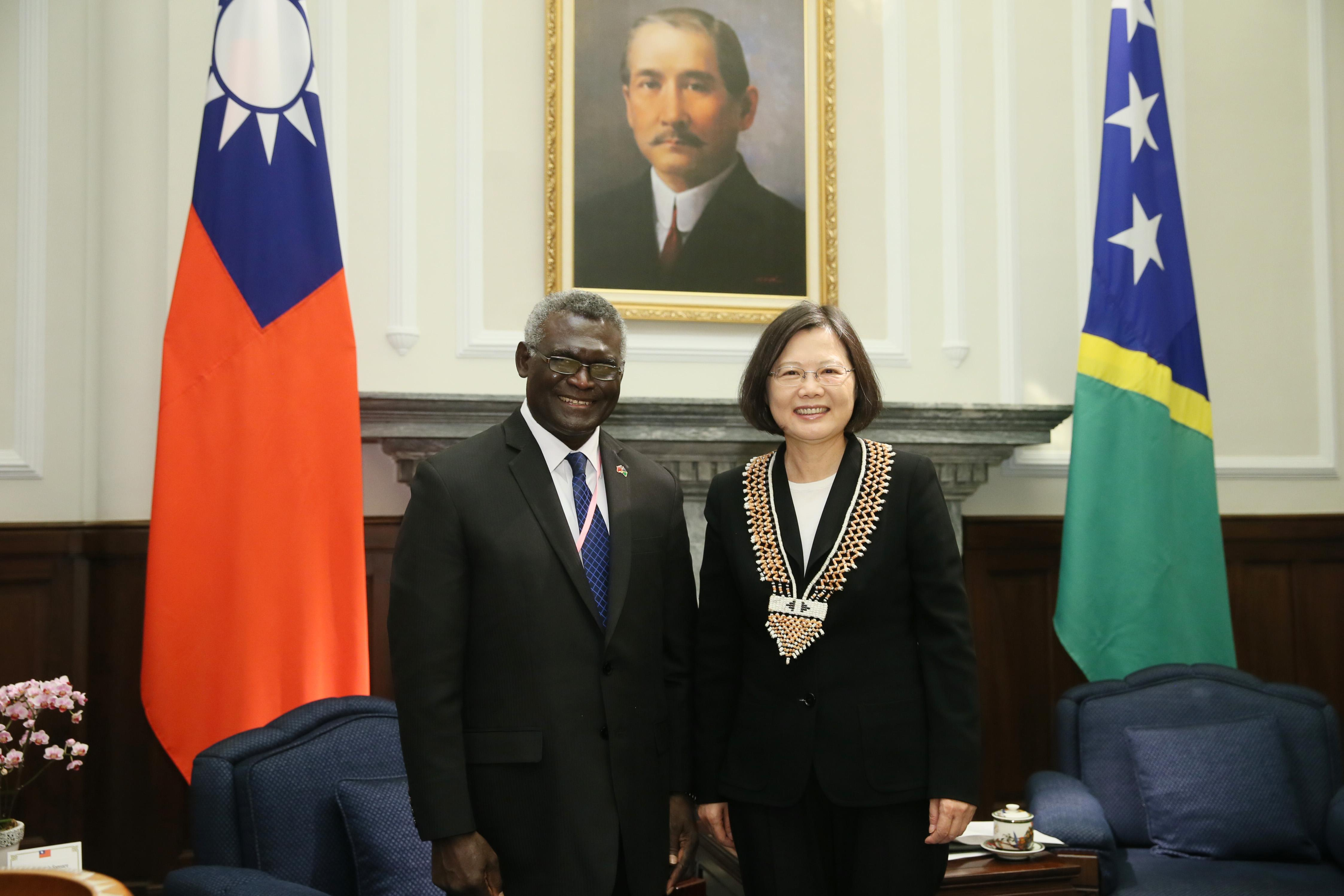
Solomon Islands Prime Minister Manasseh Sogavare meets with the President of Taiwan Tsai Ing-wen, July 2016.

Solomon Islands is a member of the United Nations, Interpol, Commonwealth of Nations, Pacific Islands Forum, Pacific Community, International Monetary Fund, and the African, Caribbean, and Pacific (ACP) countries (Lomé Convention).

Until September 2019, it was one of the few countries to recognise the Republic of China (Taiwan) and maintain formal diplomatic relations with it. The relationship was terminated in September 2019 by Solomon Islands, which switched recognition to the People's Republic of China (PRC). Relations with Papua New Guinea, which had become strained because of an influx of refugees from the Bougainville rebellion and attacks on the northern islands of Solomon Islands by elements pursuing Bougainvillean rebels, have been repaired. A 1998 peace accord on Bougainville removed the armed threat, and the two nations regularised border operations in a 2004 agreement. Since 2022, ties with China have been rapidly increasing, with Solomon Islands signing a security pact that allows the country to call for Chinese security forces to quell unrest.

In March 2017, at the 34th regular session of the UN Human Rights Council, Vanuatu made a joint statement on behalf of Solomon Islands and some other Pacific nations raising human rights violations in the Western New Guinea, which claimed by International Parliamentarians for West Papua (IPWP) that West Papua has been occupied by Indonesia since 1963, and requested that the UN High Commissioner for Human Rights produce a report. Indonesia rejected Vanuatu's allegations, replying that Vanuatu does not represent the people of Papua and it should "stop fantasizing" that it does. More than 100,000 Papuans have died during a 50-year Papua conflict. In September 2017, at the 72nd Session of the UN General Assembly, the Prime Ministers of Solomon Islands, Tuvalu and Vanuatu once again raised human rights abuses in Indonesian-occupied West Papua.

=== Military ===
Although the locally recruited British Solomon Islands Protectorate Defence Force was part of Allied Forces taking part in fighting in the Solomons during the Second World War, the country has not had any regular military forces since independence. The various paramilitary elements of the Royal Solomon Islands Police Force (RSIPF) were disbanded and disarmed in 2003 following the intervention of the Regional Assistance Mission to Solomon Islands (RAMSI). RAMSI had a small military detachment headed by an Australian commander with responsibilities for assisting the police element of RAMSI in internal and external security. The RSIPF still operates two Pacific class patrol boats (RSIPV Auki and RSIPV Lata), which constitute the de facto navy of Solomon Islands.

In the long term, it is anticipated that the RSIPF will resume the defence role of the country. The police force is headed by a commissioner, appointed by the Governor-General and responsible to the Minister of Police, National Security & Correctional Services.

The police budget of Solomon Islands has been strained due to a four-year civil war. Following Cyclone Zoe's strike on the islands of Tikopia and Anuta in December 2002, Australia had to provide the Solomon Islands government with SI$200,000 (A$50,000) for fuel and supplies for the patrol boat Lata to sail with relief supplies. (Part of the work of RAMSI includes assisting the Solomon Islands government to stabilise its budget.)

=== Administrative divisions ===
For local government, the country is divided into ten administrative areas, of which nine are provinces administered by elected provincial assemblies and the tenth is the capital Honiara, administered by the Honiara Town Council.

#	Province	Capital	Premier	Area (km^{2})	Population census 1999	Population census 2009	Population census 2019
1	Central Province	Tulagi	Kenneth Sagupari	615	21,577	26,051	30,318
2	Choiseul Province	Taro Island	Harrison Pitakaka	3,837	20,008	26,372	30,775
3	Guadalcanal Province (Note: excluding the Capital Territory of Honiara)	Honiara	Willie Atu	5,336	60,275	107,090	154,022
4	Isabel Province	Buala	Lesley Kikolo	4,136	20,421	26,158	31,420
5	Makira-Ulawa Province	Kirakira	Julian Maka'a	3,188	31,006	40,419	51,587
6	Malaita Province	Auki	Martin Fini	4,225	122,620	157,405	172,740
7	Rennell and Bellona Province	Tigoa	Japhet Tuhanuku	671	2,377	3,041	4,100
8	Temotu Province	Lata	Clay Forau	895	18,912	21,362	25,701
9	Western Province	Gizo	Billy Veo	5,475	62,739	76,649	94,106
–	Capital Territory	Honiara	Eddie Siapu (Mayor)	22	49,107	73,910	129,569
	Solomon Islands	Honiara	–	30,407	409,042	558,457	720,956

=== Human rights ===
There are human rights concerns and issues in regards to education, water/water security, sanitation, gender equality, and domestic violence, as well as others. The Solomon Islands does not have a national human rights institution that is compliant with the Paris Principles. Homosexuality is illegal in the Solomon Islands; it is punishable by up to 14 years of imprisonment.

== Geography ==
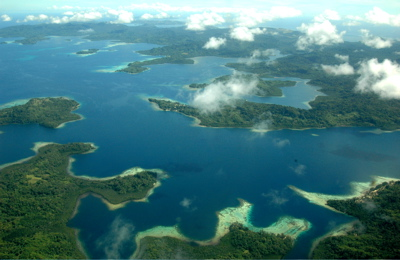
Aerial view of Solomon Islands

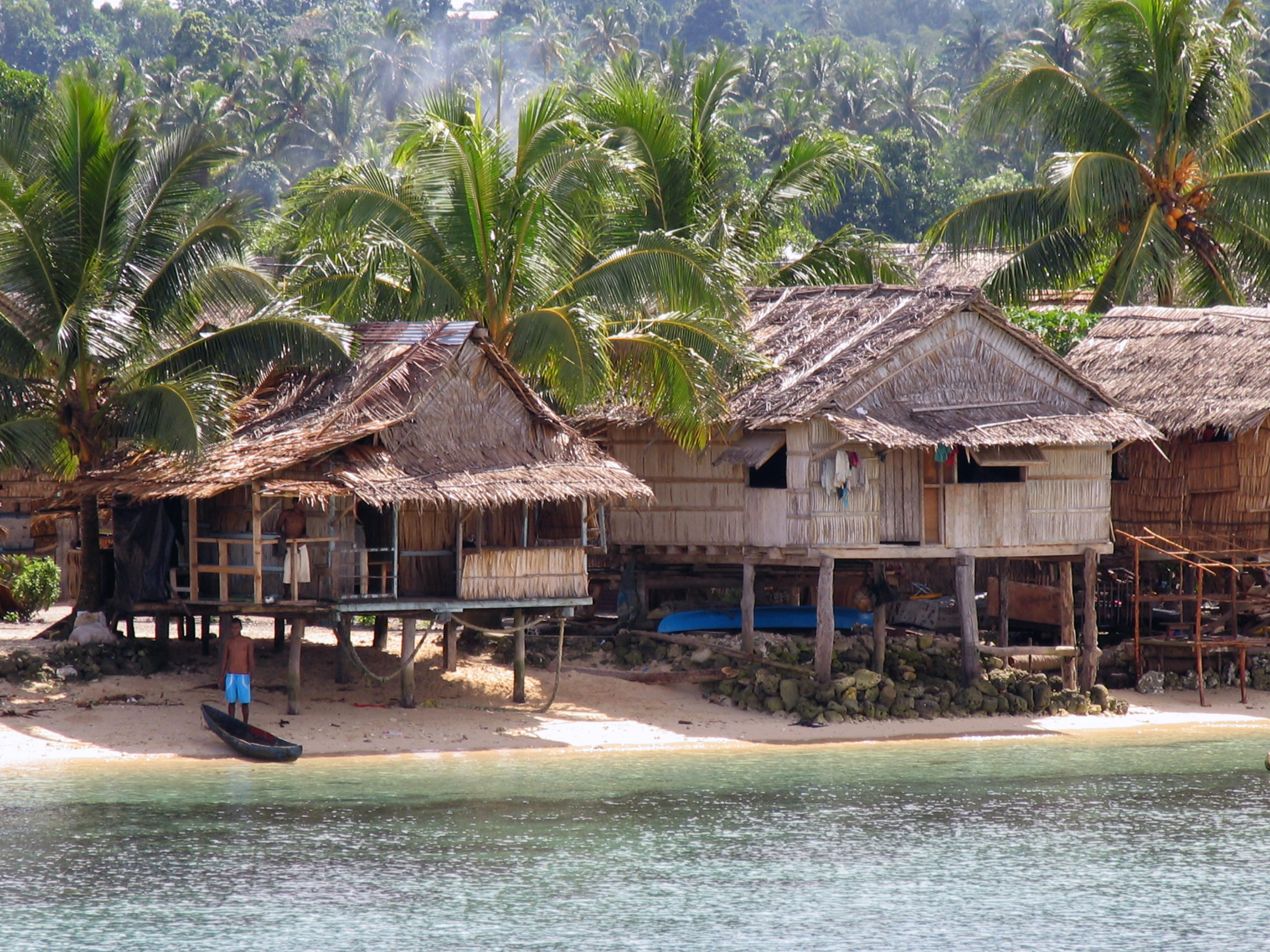
Malaita island

Solomon Islands is an island nation that lies east of Papua New Guinea and consists of six major islands and 992 smaller islands. The major part of the nation of Solomon Islands covers many of the mountainous volcanic islands of the Solomon Islands archipelago, which includes Choiseul, the Shortland Islands, the New Georgia Islands, Santa Isabel, the Russell Islands, the Nggela Islands, Tulagi, Malaita, Maramasike, Ulawa, Owaraha (Santa Ana), Makira (San Cristobal), and the main island of Guadalcanal. Solomon Islands also includes smaller, isolated low atolls and volcanic islands such as Sikaiana, Rennell Island, Bellona Island, the Santa Cruz Islands and tiny outliers such as Tikopia, Anuta, and Fatutaka. Although Bougainville is the largest island in the Solomon Islands archipelago it is politically an autonomous region of Papua New Guinea and does not form part of the nation of Solomon Islands.

The country's islands lie between latitudes 5° and 13°S, and longitudes 155° and 169°E. The distance between the westernmost and easternmost islands is 1,448 kilometres (900 mi). The Santa Cruz Islands (of which Tikopia is part) are situated north of Vanuatu and are especially isolated at more than 200 kilometres (120 mi) from the other islands.

=== Geology ===
The Solomon Islands archipelago was formed in tectonic processes and major phases of volcanic activity that formed the islands occurred between the Eocene and Middle Miocene but is quite varied. Volcanic reactivation occurred no earlier than around 8 million years ago, and ongoing activity continues to the present day with several volcanoes, including Kavachi and Savo Island.

=== Climate ===
The islands' ocean-equatorial climate is extremely humid throughout the year, with a mean temperature of 26.5 °C (79.7 °F) and few extremes of temperature or weather. June through August is the cooler period. Though seasons are not pronounced, the northwesterly winds of November through April bring more frequent rainfall and occasional squalls or cyclones. The annual rainfall is about 3,050 millimetres (120 in). According to the WorldRiskReport 2021, the island state ranks second among the countries with the highest disaster risk worldwide. The country is also one of the most vulnerable to global sea level rise from man-made climate change.

In 2023, the governments of Solomon Islands and other island states at risk from climate change (Fiji, Niue, Tuvalu, Tonga and Vanuatu) launched the "Port Vila Call for a Just Transition to a Fossil Fuel Free Pacific", calling for the phaseout of fossil fuels and the 'rapid and just transition' to renewable energy and strengthening environmental law including introducing the crime of ecocide.

Climate data for Honiara (Köppen Af)
Month	Jan	Feb	Mar	Apr	May	Jun	Jul	Aug	Sep	Oct	Nov	Dec	Year
Record high °C (°F)	33.9 (93.0)	34.1 (93.4)	33.9 (93.0)	33.4 (92.1)	33.6 (92.5)	32.8 (91.0)	33.3 (91.9)	33.5 (92.3)	33.4 (92.1)	33.3 (91.9)	33.4 (92.1)	34.8 (94.6)	34.8 (94.6)
Mean daily maximum °C (°F)	30.7 (87.3)	30.5 (86.9)	30.2 (86.4)	30.5 (86.9)	30.7 (87.3)	30.4 (86.7)	30.1 (86.2)	30.4 (86.7)	30.6 (87.1)	30.7 (87.3)	30.7 (87.3)	30.5 (86.9)	30.5 (86.9)
Daily mean °C (°F)	26.7 (80.1)	26.6 (79.9)	26.6 (79.9)	26.5 (79.7)	26.6 (79.9)	26.4 (79.5)	26.1 (79.0)	26.2 (79.2)	26.5 (79.7)	26.5 (79.7)	26.7 (80.1)	26.8 (80.2)	26.5 (79.7)
Mean daily minimum °C (°F)	23.0 (73.4)	23.0 (73.4)	23.0 (73.4)	22.9 (73.2)	22.8 (73.0)	22.5 (72.5)	22.2 (72.0)	22.1 (71.8)	22.3 (72.1)	22.5 (72.5)	22.7 (72.9)	23.0 (73.4)	22.7 (72.9)
Record low °C (°F)	20.2 (68.4)	20.7 (69.3)	20.7 (69.3)	20.1 (68.2)	20.5 (68.9)	19.4 (66.9)	18.7 (65.7)	18.8 (65.8)	18.3 (64.9)	17.6 (63.7)	17.8 (64.0)	20.5 (68.9)	17.6 (63.7)
Average precipitation mm (inches)	277 (10.9)	287 (11.3)	362 (14.3)	214 (8.4)	141 (5.6)	97 (3.8)	100 (3.9)	92 (3.6)	95 (3.7)	154 (6.1)	141 (5.6)	217 (8.5)	2,177 (85.7)
Average precipitation days (≥ 0.1 mm)	19	19	23	18	15	13	15	13	13	16	15	18	197
Average relative humidity (%)	80	81	81	80	80	79	75	73	73	75	76	77	78
Mean monthly sunshine hours	186.0	155.4	198.4	192.0	210.8	198.0	186.0	204.6	192.0	226.3	216.0	164.3	2,329.8
Mean daily sunshine hours	6.0	5.5	6.4	6.4	6.8	6.6	6.0	6.6	6.4	7.3	7.2	5.3	6.4
Source: Deutscher Wetterdienst

=== Ecology ===
Share of forest area in total land area, top countries (2021). The Solomon Islands have the sixth highest percentage of forest cover in the world.

The Solomon Islands archipelago is part of two distinct terrestrial ecoregions. Most of the islands are part of the Solomon Islands rain forests ecoregion, which also includes the islands of Bougainville and Buka; these forests have come under pressure from forestry activities. The Santa Cruz Islands are part of the Vanuatu rain forests ecoregion, together with the neighbouring archipelago of Vanuatu. The country had a 2019 Forest Landscape Integrity Index mean score of 7.19/10, ranking it 48th globally out of 172 countries. More than 230 varieties of orchids and other tropical flowers are found in Solomon Islands.

Soil quality ranges from extremely rich volcanic (there are volcanoes with varying degrees of activity on some of the larger islands) to relatively infertile limestone. The islands contain several active and dormant volcanoes. The Tinakula and Kavachi volcanoes are the most active.

On the southern side of Vangunu Island, the forests around Zaira provided the habitat for at least three vulnerable species of animals. The 200 human inhabitants of the area have been trying to get the forests declared a protected area so that logging and mining cannot be performed.

The baseline survey of marine biodiversity in the Solomon Islands that was carried out in 2004, found 474 species of corals in the Solomons as well as nine species which could be new to science. It has the second highest diversity of corals in the world, second only to the Raja Ampat Islands in eastern Indonesia.

=== Water and sanitation ===
Scarcity of fresh water and lack of sanitation have been constant challenges facing Solomon Islands. Reducing the number of those living without access to fresh water and sanitation by half was one of the 2015 Millennium Development Goals (MDGs) implemented by the United Nations through Goal 7, to ensure environmental sustainability. Though the islands generally have access to fresh water sources, it is typically only available in the state's capital of Honiara, and it is not guaranteed all year long.

A 2025 report claims one third have no access to basic drinking water and two thirds have no access to basic sanitation.

According to a UNICEF report, the capital's poorest communities do not have access to adequate places to relieve their waste, and an estimated 70% Solomon Island schools have no access to safe and clean water for drinking, washing, and relieving of waste. Lack of safe drinking water in school-age children results in high risks of contracting fatal diseases such as cholera and typhoid. The number of Solomon Islanders living with piped drinking water has been decreasing since 2011, while those living with non-piped water increased between 2000 and 2010, and has been decreasing ever since.

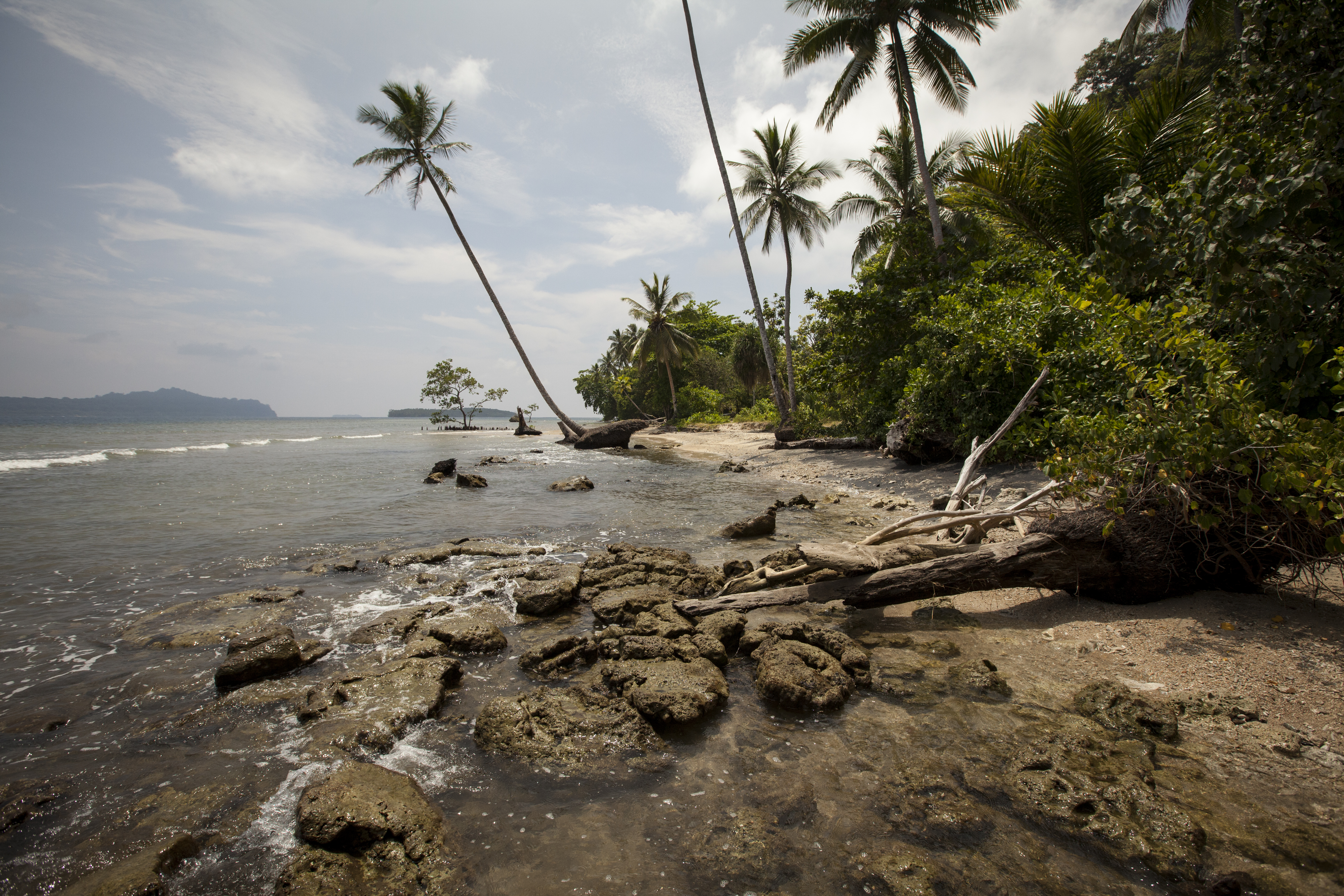
Typical coast of Solomon Islands

In addition, the Solomon Islands Second Rural Development Programme, enacted in 2014 and active until 2020, has been working to deliver infrastructure and other vital services to rural areas and villages of Solomon Islands. The programme has also encouraged farmers and other agricultural sectors. Rural villages such as Bolava, found in the Western Province of Solomon Islands, have implemented rain catchment and water storage systems. The programme is funded by various international development actors such as the World Bank, the European Union, and the Australian and Solomon Islands governments.

=== Earthquakes ===
On 2 April 2007 at 07:39:56 local time (UTC+11), an earthquake with magnitude 8.1 on the M_{w} scale occurred at hypocentre S8.453 E156.957, 349 kilometres (217 mi) northwest of the island's capital, Honiara, and south-east of the capital of Western Province, Gizo, at a depth of 10 km (6.2 miles). More than 44 aftershocks with magnitude 5.0 or greater occurred up until 22:00:00 UTC, 4 April 2007. A tsunami followed killing at least 52 people, destroying more than 900 homes and leaving thousands of people homeless. Land upthrust extended the shoreline of one island, Ranongga, by up to 70 metres (230 ft), exposing many coral reefs.

On 6 February 2013, an earthquake with a magnitude of 8.0 occurred at epicentre S10.80 E165.11 in the Santa Cruz Islands followed by a tsunami up to 1.5 metres. At least nine people were killed and many houses demolished. The main quake was preceded by a sequence of earthquakes with a magnitude of up to 6.0.

== Economy ==
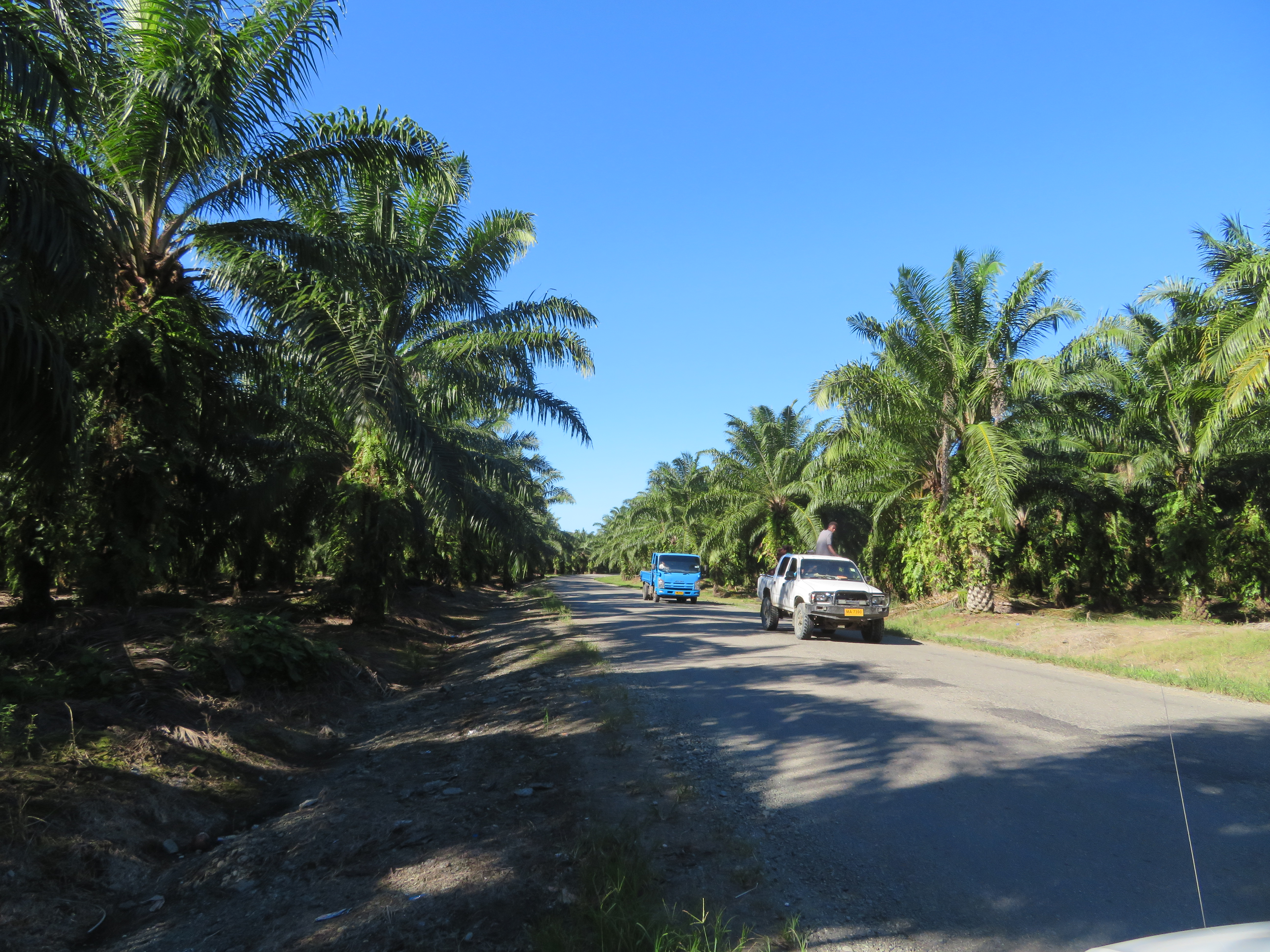
Plantation of oil palms near Tetere on Guadalcanal

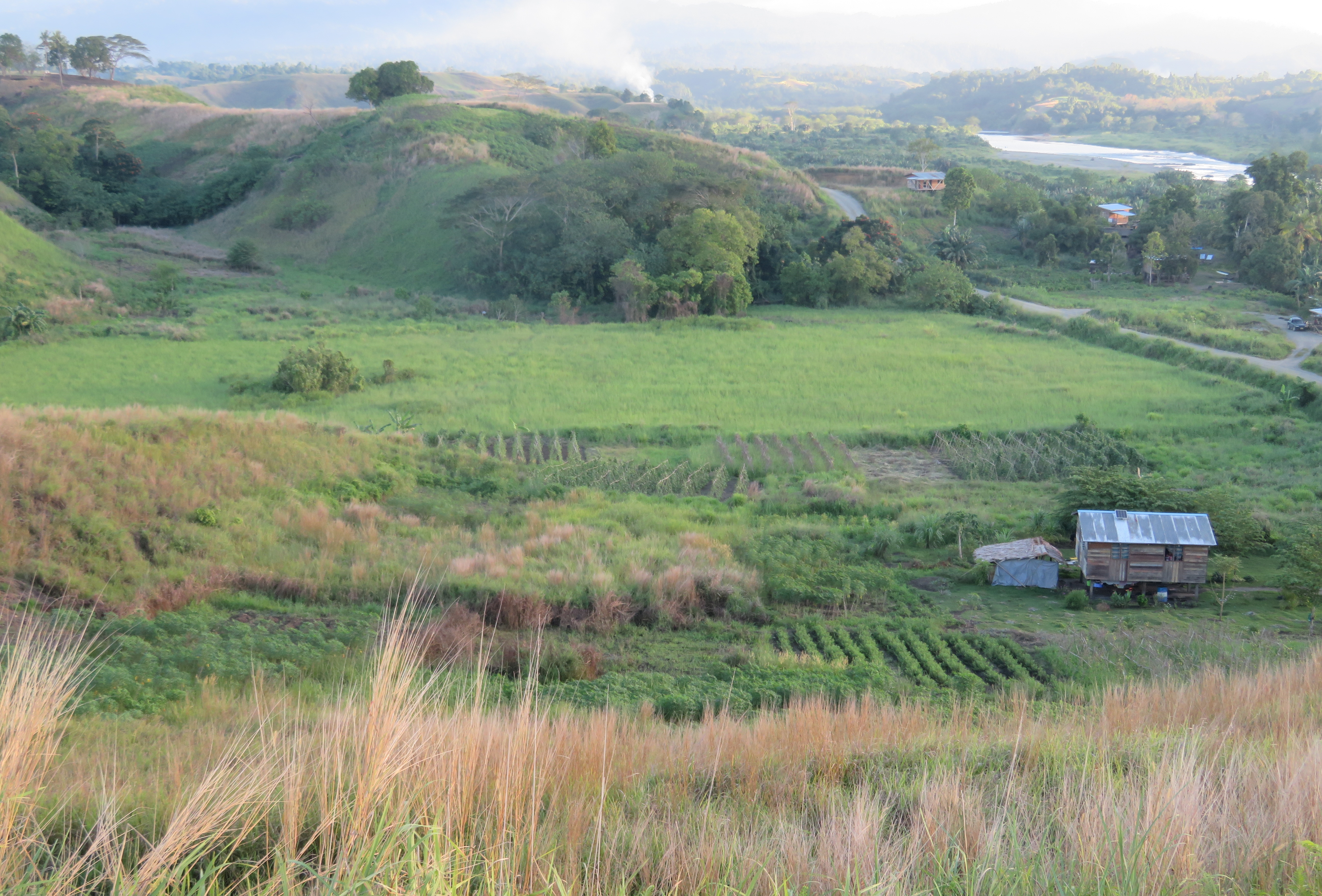
Subsistence agriculture near Honiara

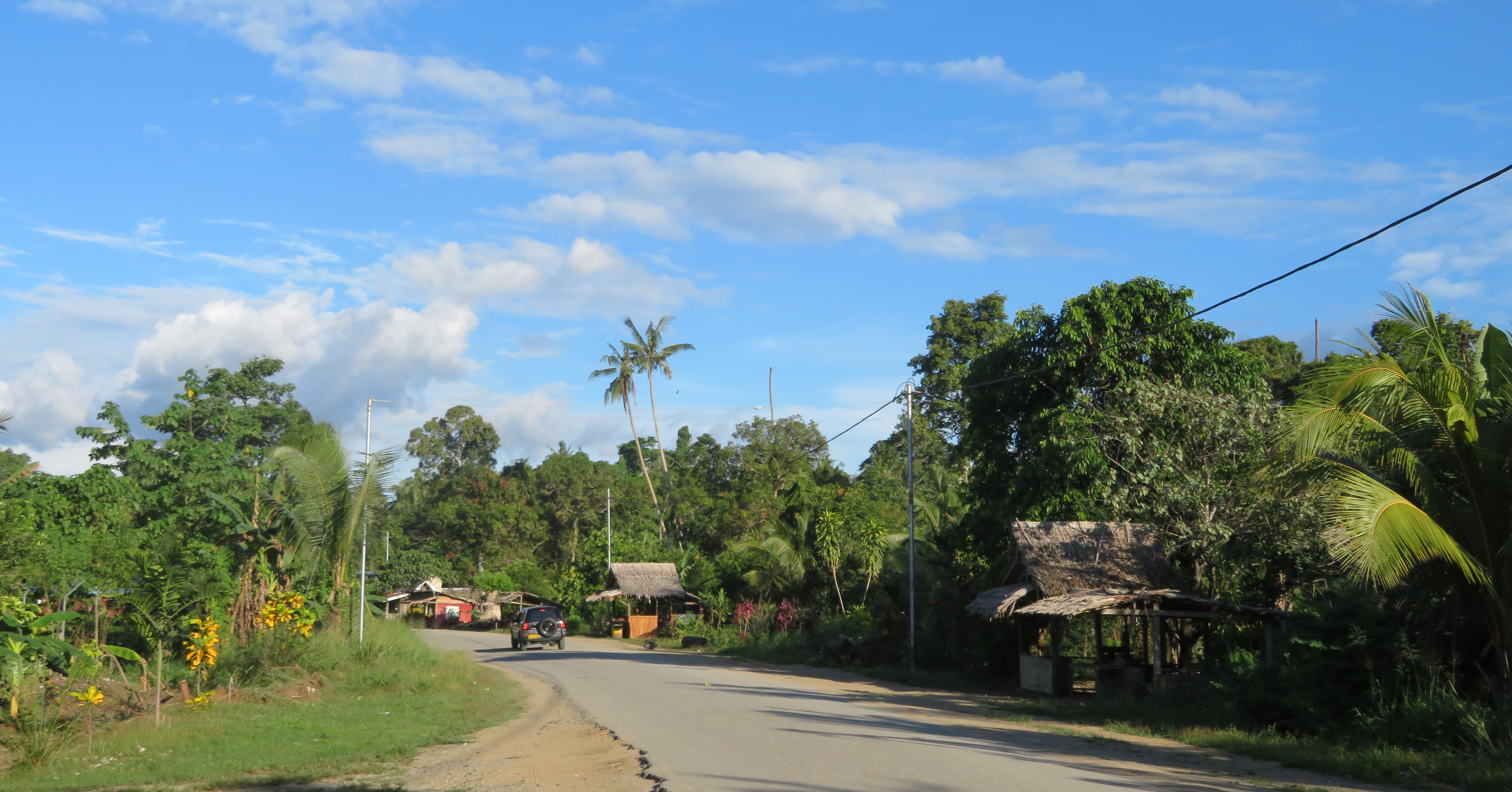
One of the most important roads on the North coast of Guadalcanal in Tamboko

The Solomon Islands' per-capita GDP of $600 ranks it as a least developed country, and more than 75% of its labour force is engaged in subsistence agriculture and fishing. Most manufactured goods and petroleum products must be imported. Only 3.9% of the area of the islands is used for agriculture, and 78.1% are covered by forests, making the Solomon Islands the 7th-ranked country in terms of percent forest coverage worldwide as of 2022.

The Solomon Islands Government was insolvent by 2002. Since the RAMSI intervention in 2003, the government has recast its budget. Principal aid donors are Australia, New Zealand, the European Union, Japan, and Taiwan.

=== Currency ===
The Solomon Islands dollar (ISO 4217 code: SBD) was introduced in 1977, replacing the Australian dollar at par. Its symbol is "SI$", but the "SI" prefix may be omitted if there is no confusion with other currencies also using the dollar sign, "$". It is subdivided into 100 cents. Local shell money is still important for traditional and ceremonial purposes in certain provinces and, in some remote parts of the country, for trade. Shell money was a widely used traditional currency in the Pacific Islands; in Solomon Islands, it is mostly manufactured in Malaita and Guadalcanal but can be bought elsewhere, such as the Honiara Central Market. The barter system often replaces money of any kind in remote areas.

=== Exports ===
Until 1998, when world prices for tropical timber fell steeply, timber was Solomon Islands' main export product. In June 2000, exports of palm oil and gold ceased while exports of timber fell.

The Solomon Islands courts have re-approved the export of live dolphins for profit, most recently to Dubai, United Arab Emirates. This practice was originally stopped by the government in 2004 after uproar over a shipment of 28 live dolphins to Mexico. The move resulted in criticism from both Australia and New Zealand as well as several conservation organisations. As of 2022, rough wood makes up two-thirds of the country's exports, worth over SI$2.5 billion (US$308 million).

=== Agriculture ===
In 2017, 317,682 tons of coconuts were harvested, making the country the 18th ranked producer of coconuts worldwide; 24% of the exports corresponded to copra. Cocoa beans are mainly grown on the islands Guadalcanal, Makira, and Malaita. In 2017, 4,940 tons of cocoa beans were harvested, making the Solomon Islands the 27th ranked producer of cocoa worldwide. Growth of production and export of copra and cacao, however, is hampered by old age of most coconut and cacao trees. In 2017, 285,721 tons of palm oil were produced, making Solomon Islands the 24th ranked producer of palm oil worldwide.

For the local market but not for export, many families grow taro (2017: 45,901 tons), rice (2017: 2,789 tons), yams (2017: 44,940 tons), and bananas (2017: 313 tons). Tobacco (2017: 118 tons) and spices (2017: 217 tons) were also produced.

=== Mining ===
In 1998, gold mining began at Gold Ridge on Guadalcanal. Mineral exploration in other areas continued. The islands are rich in undeveloped mineral resources such as lead, zinc, nickel, and gold. Negotiations are underway that may lead to the eventual reopening of the Gold Ridge mine, which was closed after the riots in 2006. Rennell Island bauxite mine operated from 2011 to 2021 on Rennell Island, leaving behind serious ecological damage after multiple spills.

=== Fisheries ===
Solomon Islands' fisheries also offer prospects for export and domestic economic expansion. A Japanese joint venture, Solomon Taiyo Ltd., which operated the only fish cannery in the country, closed in mid-2000 as a result of the ethnic disturbances. Though the plant has reopened under local management, the export of tuna has not resumed.

=== Tourism ===
In 2017, Solomon Islands was visited by 26,000 tourists, making the country one of the least frequently visited countries of the world. The Solomon Island government hoped to increase the number of tourists up to 30,000 per year by the end of 2019 and up to 60,000 tourists per year by the end of 2025. In 2019, the Solomon Islands were visited by 28,900 tourists and in 2020 by 4,400.

=== Energy ===
A team of renewable energy developers working for the South Pacific Applied Geoscience Commission (SOPAC) and funded by the Renewable Energy and Energy Efficiency Partnership (REEEP) have developed a scheme that allows local communities to access renewable energy, such as solar, water, and wind power, without the need to raise substantial sums of cash. Under the scheme, islanders who are unable to pay for solar lanterns in cash may pay instead in kind with crops.

== Infrastructure ==
=== Flight connections ===
Solomon Airlines connects Honiara International Airport to Nadi in Fiji, Port Vila in Vanuatu, and Brisbane in Australia as well as to more than 20 domestic airports in each province of the country. To promote tourism Solomon Airlines introduced a weekly direct flight connection between Brisbane and Munda in 2019. Virgin Australia connects Honiara to Brisbane twice a week. Most of the domestic airports are accessible to small planes only as they have short, grass runways.

=== Roads ===
The road system in Solomon Islands is insufficient and there are no railways. The most important roads connect Honiara to Lambi (58 km; 36 miles) in the western part of Guadalcanal and to Aola (75 km; 47 miles) in the eastern part. There are few buses and these do not circulate according to a fixed timetable. In Honiara, there is no bus terminus.

=== Ferries ===
Most of the islands can be reached by ferry from Honiara. There is a daily connection from Honiara to Auki via Tulagi by a high speed catamaran.

== Demographics ==
Population
Year	Million
1950	0.09
2000	0.4
2021	0.7

The total population at the November 2019 census was 721,455. As of 2021, there were 707,851 people in the Solomon Islands. The population is slightly skewed towards males, with there being around 370,000 males compared to 356,000 for females.

=== Ethnic groups ===
Ethnic groups in the Solomon Islands
Ethnic groups	percent
Melanesian	95.3%
Polynesian	3.1%
Micronesian	1.2%
Chinese	0.1%
European	0.1%
Other	0.1%

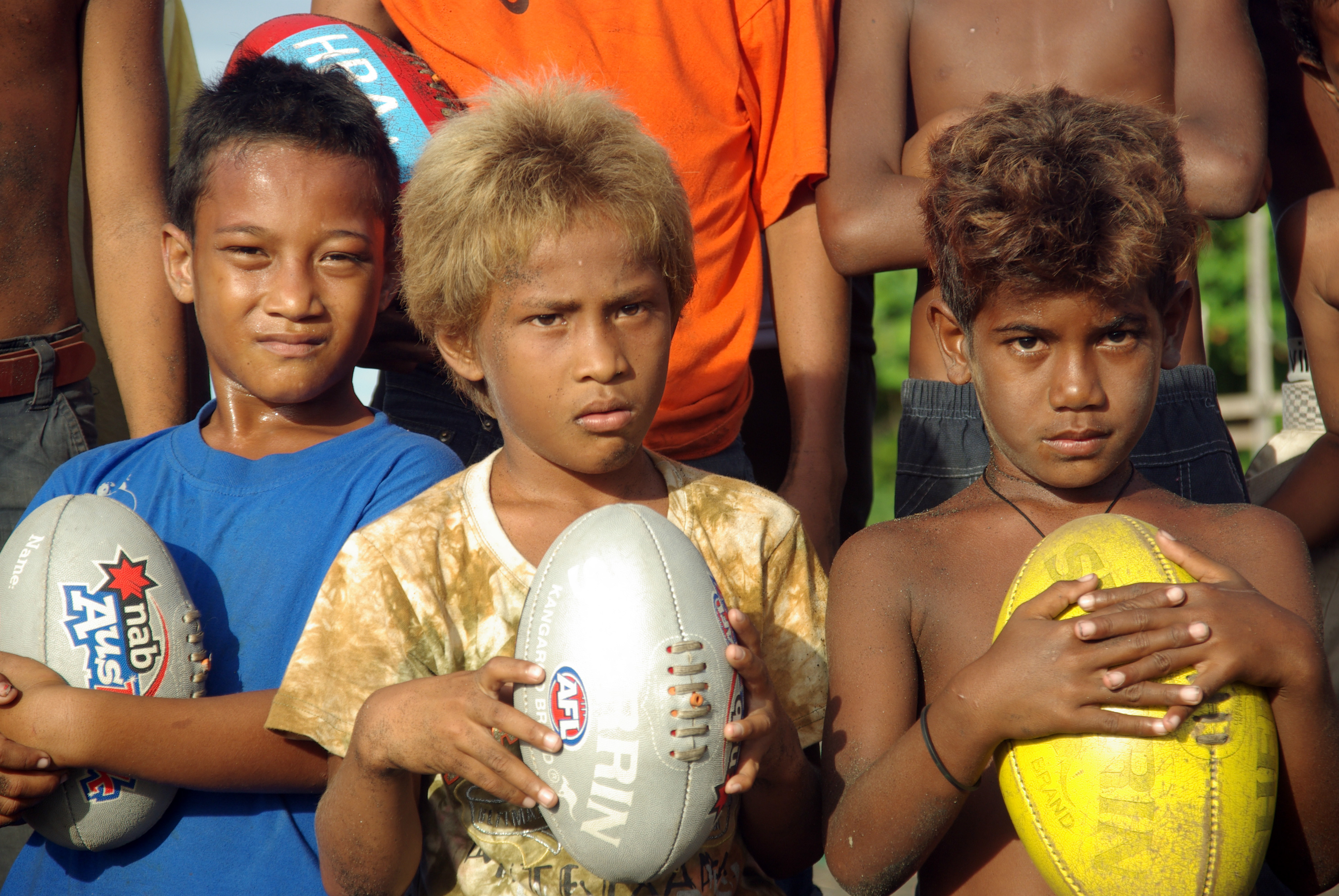
Solomon Islander boys from Honiara. People with brown or blond hair are quite common among Solomon Islanders without any European admixture, especially among children.

The majority of Solomon Islanders are ethnically Melanesian (95.3%). Polynesian (3.1%) and Micronesian (1.2%) are the two other significant groups. There are a few thousand Europeans and a similar number of ethnic Chinese.

=== Languages ===
While English is the official language, only 1–2% of the population are able to communicate fluently in English. However, an English creole, Solomons Pijin, is a de facto lingua franca of the country spoken by the majority of the population, along with local indigenous languages. Pijin is closely related to Tok Pisin spoken in Papua New Guinea.

The number of local languages listed for Solomon Islands is 74, of which 70 are living languages and 4 are extinct, according to Ethnologue, Languages of the World. Western Oceanic languages (predominantly of the Southeast Solomonic group) are spoken on the central islands. Polynesian languages are spoken on Rennell and Bellona to the south; Tikopia, Anuta, and Fatutaka to the far east; Sikaiana to the north east; and Luaniua (Ontong Java Atoll) to the north. The immigrant population from Kiribati (the i-Kiribati) speak Gilbertese.

Most of the indigenous languages are Austronesian languages. The Central Solomon languages such as Bilua, Lavukaleve, Savosavo, and Touo constitute an independent family within Papuan languages.

=== Religion ===
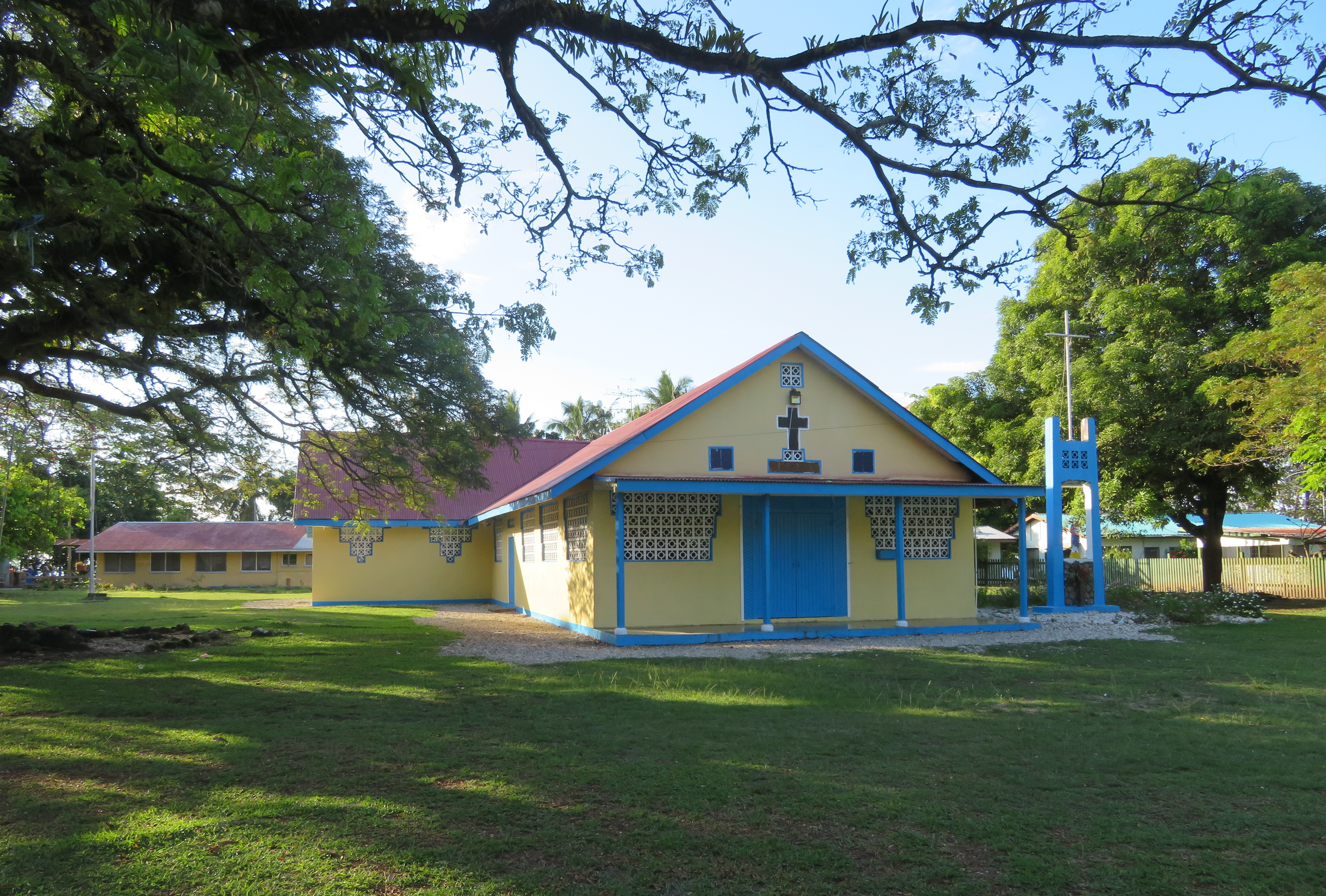
Catholic Church in Tanagai on Guadalcanal

The religion of Solomon Islands is 92% Christian. The main Christian denominations are: Anglican 35%, Catholic 19%, the South Seas Evangelical Church 17%, the United Church 11%, and Seventh-day Adventist 10%. Other religions include the Jehovah's Witnesses, the New Apostolic Church (80 churches), and the Church of Jesus Christ of Latter-day Saints.

Another 5% adhere to aboriginal beliefs. The remaining 3% adhere to Islam or the Baháʼí Faith. According to the most recent reports, Islam in Solomon Islands is made up of approximately 350 Muslims, including members of the Ahmadiyya Islamic community.

=== Health ===
In 2018, there were 59,191 confirmed cases of malaria infections, of which 59.3% (35,072) were Plasmodium vivax and 26.7% (15,771) Plasmodium falciparum. A small-scale study had once reported a 20% case of Chlamydia trachomatis out of 296 women. In 2021, the top cause of deaths, according to the WHO, was ischaemic heart disease, followed by stroke and diabetes mellitus. Another prevalent case is the Zika virus and Dengue virus. Dengue fever in the country was first reported in 1982 in Honiara. A subsequent outbreak in 2013 resulted in its first reported deaths. Later, the Solomon Islands recorded its first Zika virus outbreak in 2015.

=== Education ===
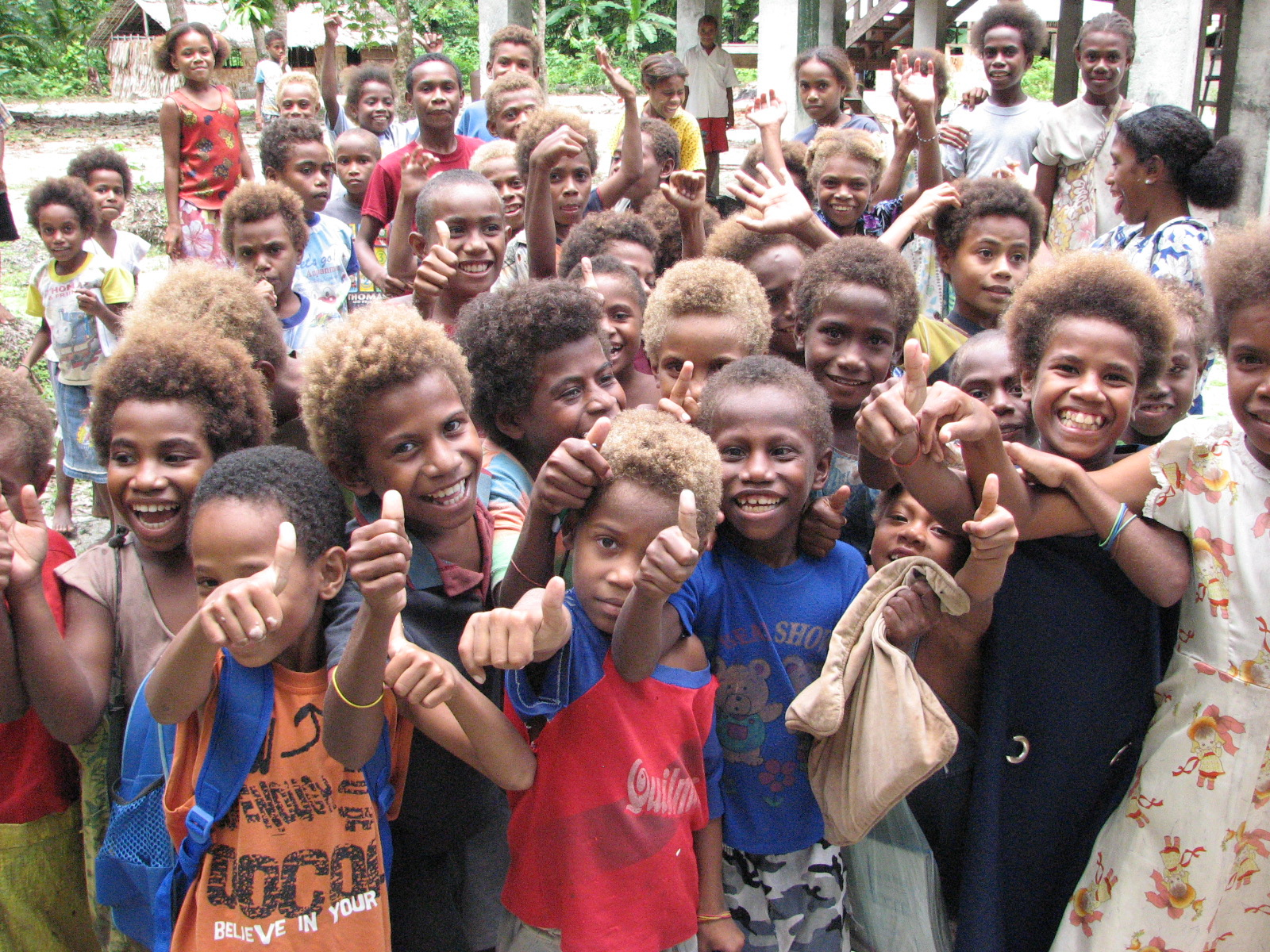
Children at the school in Tuo village, Fenualoa

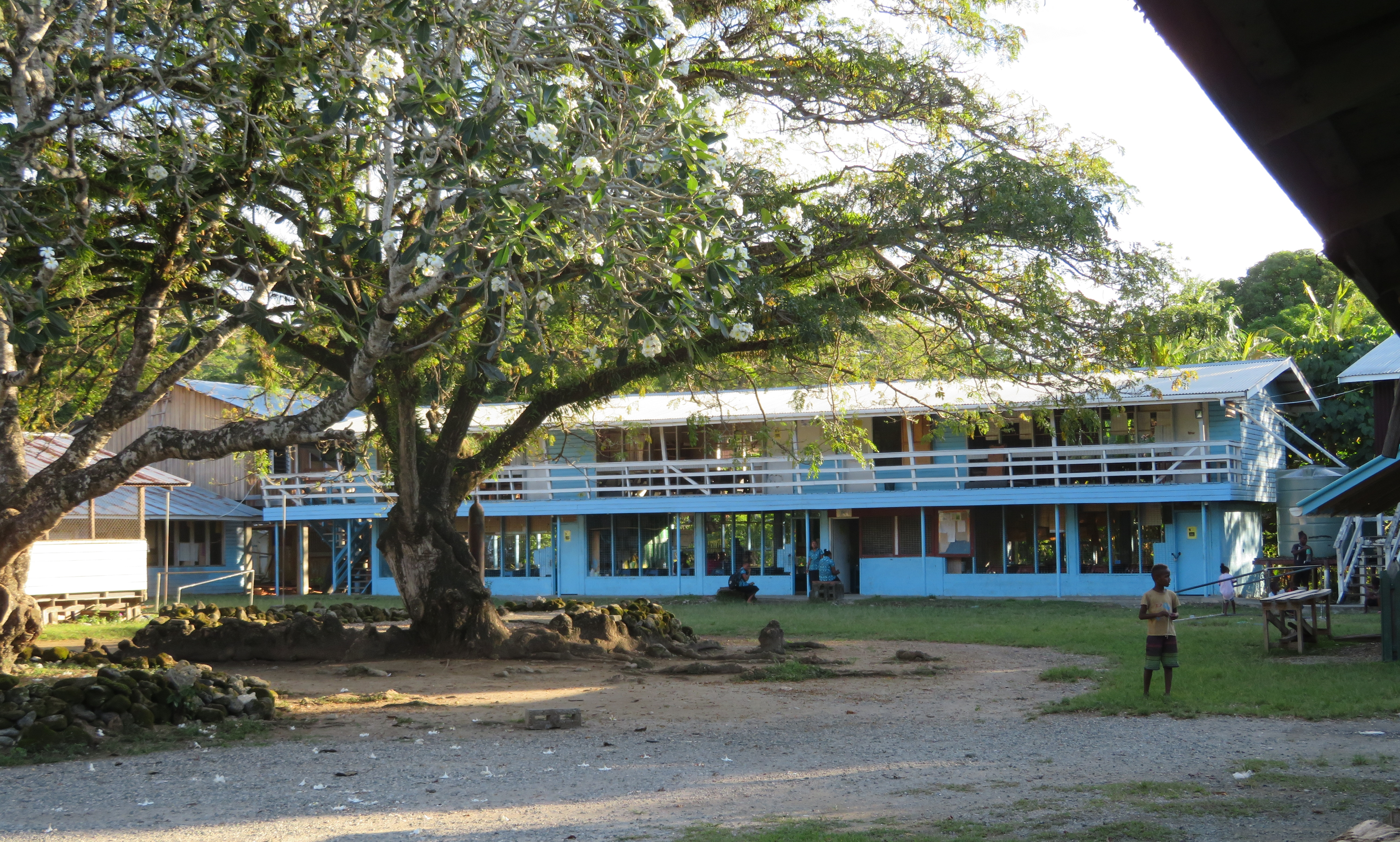
School in Tanagai on Guadalcanal

Education in Solomon Islands is not compulsory, and only 60 percent of school-age children have access to primary education. There are kindergartens in various places, including the capital, but they are not free. The University of the South Pacific, which has campuses in 12 Pacific island nations, has a campus in the capital, Honiara, Guadalcanal.

From 1990 to 1994, the gross primary school enrolment rose from 84.5 percent to 96.6 percent. Primary school attendance rates were unavailable for Solomon Islands as of 2001. The Department of Education and Human Resource Development had planned to expand educational facilities and increase enrolment rates. However, these actions have been hindered by a lack of government funding and the poor coordination of programmes. The percentage of the government's budget allocated to education was 9.7 percent in 1998, down from 13.2 percent in 1990. Male educational attainment tends to be higher than female educational attainment. The literacy rate of the adult population amounted to 84.1% in 2015 (men 88.9%, women 79.23%).

The Human Rights Measurement Initiative (HRMI) finds that the Solomon Islands is fulfilling only 70.1% of what it should be fulfilling for the right to education based on the country's level of income. HRMI breaks down the right to education by looking at the rights to both primary education and secondary education. While taking into consideration the Solomon Islands' income level, the nation is achieving 94.9% of what should be possible based on its resources (income) for primary education, but only 45.4% for secondary education.

== Culture ==
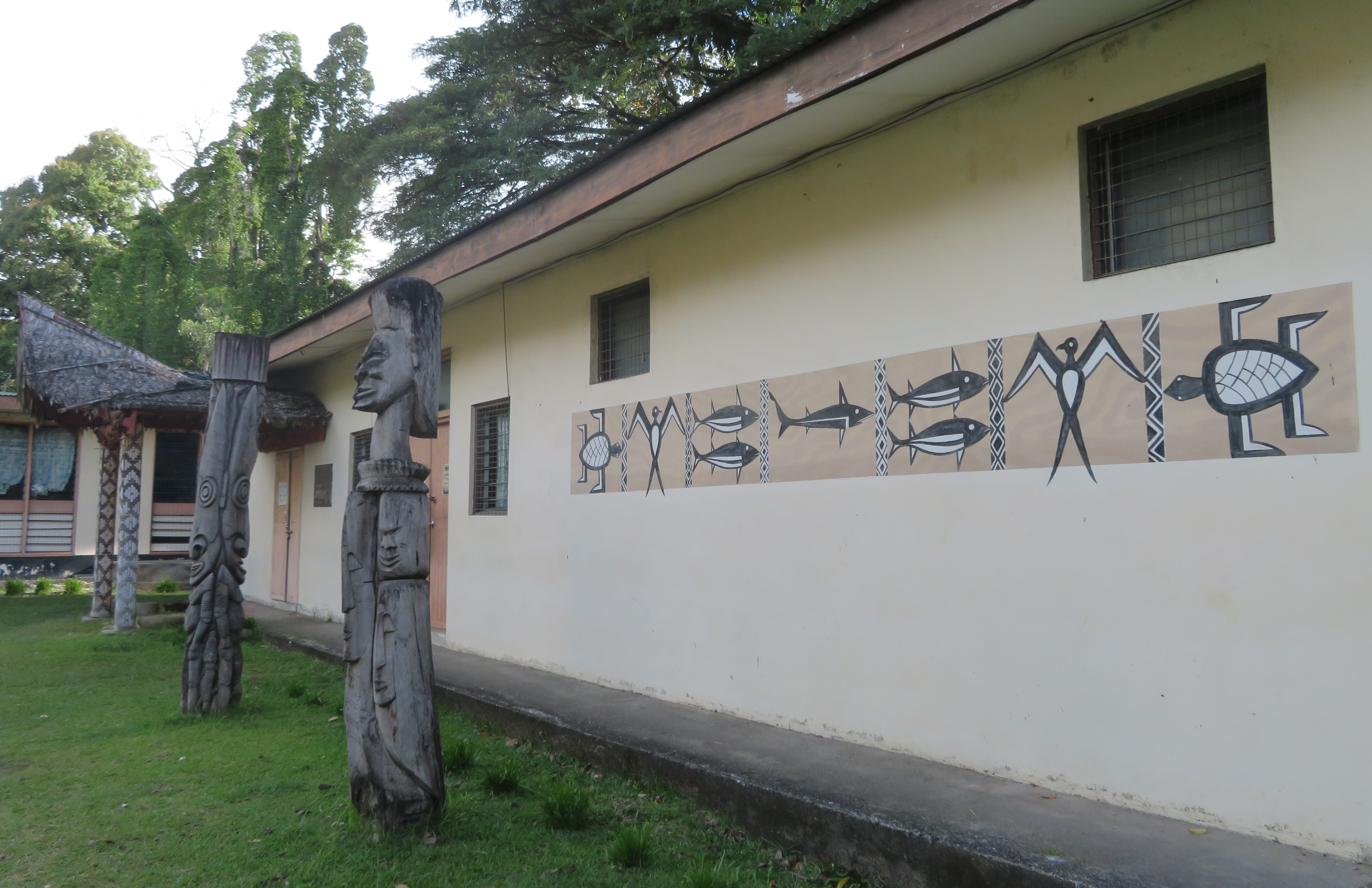
Traditional painting and wood carving in the National Museum in Honiara

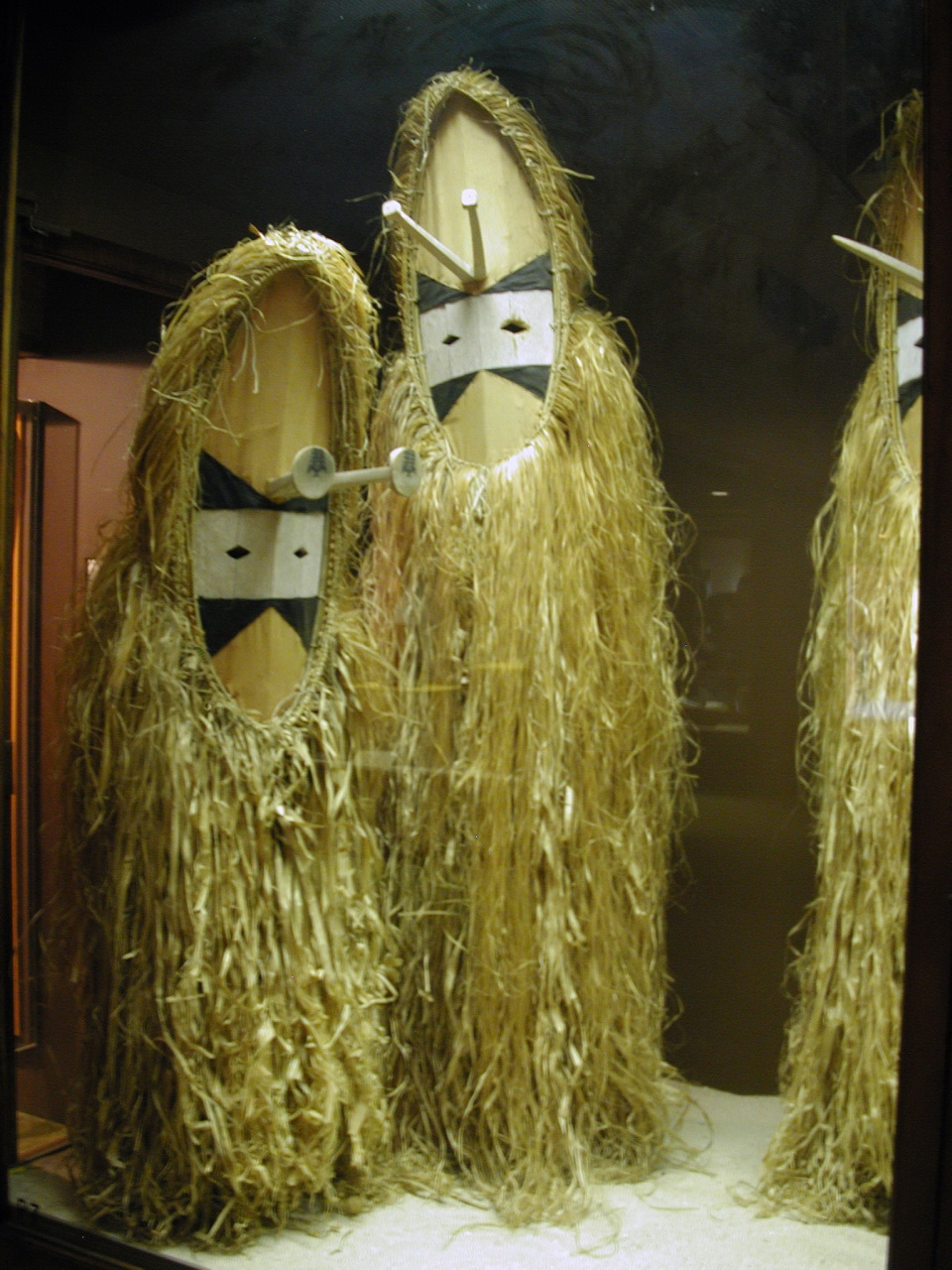
A traditional dance costume

The culture of the Solomon Islands is diverse among the groups living within the Solomon Islands archipelago, which lies within Melanesia in the Pacific Ocean, with the peoples distinguished by island, language, topography, and geography. The cultural area includes the nation-state of Solomon Islands and Bougainville Island, which is a part of Papua New Guinea. The Solomon Islands includes some culturally Polynesian societies that lie outside the main region of Polynesian influence, known as the Polynesian Triangle. There are seven Polynesian outliers within the Solomon Islands: Anuta, Bellona, Ontong Java, Rennell, Sikaiana, Tikopia, and Vaeakau-Taumako.

There are majority cultural concepts such as the Wantok concept of people with a common language who are blood relatives being part of the extended family support and expected to assist one another and the Pijin term Kastom for both traditional beliefs and traditional land ownership concepts.

Malaitan shell-money, manufactured in the Langa Langa Lagoon, is the traditional currency used in Malaita and throughout the Solomon Islands. The money consists of small, polished shell disks that are drilled and placed on strings. In the Solomons Tectus niloticus is harvested, which was traditionally made into items such as pearl buttons and jewellery.

=== Gender inequality and domestic violence ===
Solomon Islands has one of the highest rates of family and sexual violence (FSV) in the world, with 64% of women aged 15–49 having reported physical and/or sexual abuse by a partner. As per a World Health Organization (WHO) report issued in 2011, "the causes of Gender Based Violence (GBV) are multiple, but it primarily stems from gender inequality and its manifestations." The report stated:

In Solomon Islands, GBV has been largely normalized: 73% of men and 73% of women believe violence against women is justifiable, especially for infidelity and "disobedience," as when women do "not live up to the gender roles that society imposes." For example, women who believed they could occasionally refuse sex were four times more likely to experience GBV from an intimate partner. Men cited acceptability of violence and gender inequality as two main reasons for GBV, and almost all of them reported hitting their female partners as a "form of discipline," suggesting that women could improve the situation by "[learning] to obey [them]."

Another driver of gender inequality in Solomon Islands is the traditional practice of bride price. Although specific customs vary between communities, paying a bride price is considered similar to a property title, giving men ownership over women. Gender norms of masculinity tend to encourage men to "control" their wives, often through violence, while women felt that bride prices prevented them from leaving men. Another report issued by the WHO in 2013 reported that 64% of women aged 15–49 who had ever had an intimate partner had experienced some kind of violence by the partner. In 2014, Solomon Islands officially launched the Family Protection Act 2014, which was aimed at curbing domestic violence in the country.

=== Literature ===
Writers from Solomon Islands include the novelists John Saunana and Rexford Orotaloa and the poet Jully Makini.

=== Media ===
==== Newspapers ====
There is one daily newspaper, the Solomon Star; one daily online news website, Solomon Times Online; two weekly papers, Solomons Voice and Solomon Times; and two monthly papers, Agrikalsa Nius and the Citizen's Press.

==== Radio ====
Radio is the most influential type of media in the Solomon Islands due to language differences, illiteracy, and the difficulty of receiving television signals in some parts of the country. The Solomon Islands Broadcasting Corporation (SIBC) operates public radio services, including the national stations Radio Happy Isles 1037 on the dial and Wantok FM 96.3, and the provincial stations Radio Happy Lagoon and, formerly, Radio Temotu. There are two commercial FM stations: Z FM at 99.5 in Honiara (but also receivable over a large majority of island out from Honiara) and PAOA FM at 97.7 in Honiara (also broadcasting on 107.5 in Auki), and one community FM radio station, Gold Ridge FM on 88.7.

==== Television ====
No television service covers the entire Solomon Islands, but some coverage is available in six main centres in four of the nine provinces. Satellite TV stations can be received. In Honiara, there is a free-to-air HD digital TV, analogue TV, and an online service called Telekom Television Limited, operated by Solomon Telekom Co. Ltd., which rebroadcasts a number of regional and international TV services, including ABC Australia and BBC World News. Residents can also subscribe to SATSOL, a digital paid TV service that can retransmit satellite television.

==== Others ====
There were approximately 229,500 internet users in the Solomon Islands at the start of 2022. Before that, the 2019 census reported that 225,945 people of age 12 years and above, the majority of whom came from Honiara, owned a mobile phone.

=== Music ===
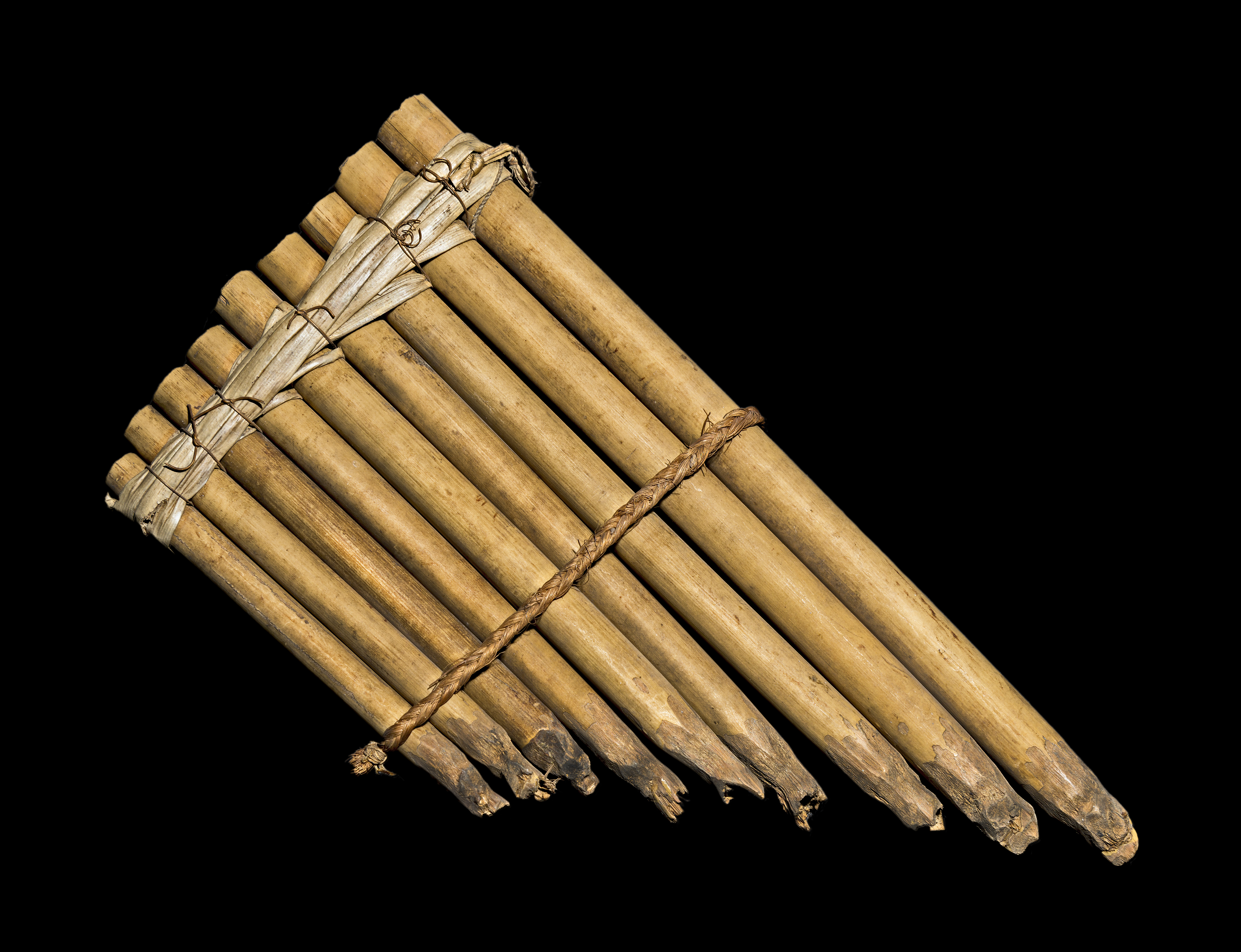
A pan flute, nineteenth century, MHNT

Traditional Melanesian music in Solomon Islands includes both group and solo vocals, slit-drum and panpipe ensembles. Bamboo music gained a following in the 1920s. In the 1950s, Edwin Nanau Sitori composed the song "Walkabout long Chinatown", which has been referred to by the government as the unofficial "national song" of the Solomon Islands. Modern Solomon Islander popular music includes various kinds of rock and reggae as well as island music.

=== Sport ===
The Solomon Islands national rugby union team has played internationals since 1969. It took part in the Oceania qualifying tournament for the 2003 and 2007 Rugby World Cups, but did not qualify on either occasion.

The Solomon Islands national football team is part of the OFC confederation in FIFA. They are ranked 147th for the men and 86th for the women team out of 210 teams in the FIFA World Rankings in 2024. The team became the first team to beat New Zealand in qualifying for a play-off spot against Australia for qualification to the World Cup 2006. They were defeated 7–0 in Australia and 2–1 at home.

Closely related to Association Football. On 14 June 2008, the Solomon Islands national futsal team, the Kurukuru, won the Oceania Futsal Championship in Fiji to qualify them for the 2008 FIFA Futsal World Cup, which was held in Brazil from 30 September to 19 October 2008. Solomon Islands is the futsal defending champions in the Oceania region. In 2008 and 2009, the Kurukuru won the Oceania Futsal Championship in Fiji. In 2009, they defeated the host nation Fiji 8–0 to claim the title. The Kurukuru currently hold the world record for the fastest ever goal scored in an official futsal match. It was set by Kurukuru captain Elliot Ragomo, who scored against New Caledonia three seconds into the game in July 2009. They were beaten by Russia with two goals to thirty-one in 2008.

The Solomon Islands national beach soccer team, the Bilikiki Boys, have won all three regional championships to date, thereby qualifying on each occasion for the FIFA Beach Soccer World Cup. The Bilikiki Boys are ranked fourteenth in the world as of 2010, higher than any other team from Oceania.

Solomon Islands hosted the 2023 Pacific Games.

In early 2026, for the first time, Solomon Islands participated in the Men's World Floorball Championships AOFC Qualification Tournament held in Wellington New Zealand.

== See also ==
- Outline of Solomon Islands
