= 9th Parliament of Solomon Islands =

The 9th Parliament of Solomon Islands, determined by the 2010 general election, was the National Parliament of Solomon Islands from 2010 until 2014. It was preceded by the eighth and followed by the tenth.

The 9th Parliament consisted in 50 representatives, elected from 50 single-seat constituencies.

== Party standings ==
The various parties had the following number of seats. The Speaker is chosen from outside Parliament.

Party	Seats	Change since 8th Parliament
Democratic Party	13	+8
OUR Party	3	+3
Reformed Democratic Party	3	+3
Independent Democratic Party	2	+2
People's Alliance Party	2	-6
Party for Rural Advancement	2	-3
Liberal Party	1	-2
National Party	1	-3
People's Congress Party	1	+1
People's Federation Party	1	+1
Rural and Urban Political Party	1	+1
Rural Development Party	1	+1
Independents	19	+7
Speaker	1	n/a

== Members ==
The following were the 50 members of the 9th Parliament.

Of these, only seven had been in Parliament prior to 2006. Job Tausinga is Parliament's veteran, having been continuously elected since 1984. Danny Philip was first elected in 1984, but lost his seat in 2001, before regaining it in 2010. Walter Folotalu was first elected in 1994, lost his seat in 1997, and returned to Parliament in a by-election in 2008. Manasseh Sogavare and Snyder Rini have both continuously been elected since 1997. Gordon Darcy Lilo is serving his third consecutive term, having first been elected in 2001. And James Tora first entered Parliament in a by-election in 2004. Twenty other MPs (including the now deceased Toswel Kaua) are serving their second term, while the other twenty-three (including the now deceased Steve Laore, and disgraced Jimmy Lusibaea) are first time MPs.

From among these MPs, Prime Minister Danny Philip appointed his Cabinet on 27 August, while Opposition Leader Steve Abana appointed his Shadow Cabinet on 31 August. Additionally, Clay Forau was elected Leader of the Independent Members of Parliament.

MP	Party	Constituency	In Parliament since...	Cabinet position?
Steve William Abana	Democratic	Fataleka	2006	no (Leader of the Opposition; Shadow Minister for Public Service, Aug. 2010- )
Peter Shannel Agovaka	OUR Party	Central Guadalcanal	2006	Minister for Foreign Affairs and Trade Relations (Aug. 2010- )
Lional Alex	Independent	South Vella La Vella	2010	Minister for Rural Development and Indigenous Affairs (Aug. 2010- )
Heinz Horst Bodo Dettke	Independent	North West Guadalcanal	2010	Minister for Forestry (Aug.-Nov. 2010); Minister for Fisheries & Marine Resources (Dec. 2010- )
Douglas Ete	Reformed Democratic	East Honiara	2010	Minister for Public Service (Aug.-Dec. 2010); Minister for Forestry (Dec. 2010-Jan. 2011)
Jackson Fiulaua	Independent	Central Kwara'ae	2010	Minister for Infrastructure and Development (Aug. 2010- )
Walter Folotalu	Democratic	Lau/Mbaelelea	2008 previously MP from 1994 to 1997	no (Shadow Minister for Communication and Aviation; Shadow Minister for Police, National Security and Correctional services, Aug. 2010- )
Clay Forau Soalaoi	People's Federation	Temotu Vatud	2006	no (Leader of the Independent Members, Aug. 2010- )
John Moffat Fugui	Independent	Central Honiara	2010	Minister for the Environment and Conservation (Aug. 2010- )
Moses Garu	Democratic	West Guadalcanal	2010	no (Shadow Minister for Rural Development and Indigenous Affairs, Aug. 2010- )
Alfred Ghiro	Democratic	East Makira	2010	no (Shadow Minister for Provincial Government and Institutional strengthening, Aug. 2010- )
Seth Gukuna	Independent	Rennell-Bellona	2006	no (Shadow Minister for Culture and Tourism, Aug. 2010- )
Dick Ha'amori	Rural Development	West Makira	2006	Minister for Education and Human Resources (Aug. 2010- )
Rick Houenipwela	Democratic	Small Malaita	2010	no (Shadow Minister for Finance and Treasury, Aug. 2010- )
Shemuel Sam Iduri	Democratic	West Kwara'ae	2006	no (Shadow Minister for National Unity, Reconciliation and Peace, Aug. 2010- )
Martin Kealoe	Democratic	Malaita Outer Islands	2010	no
Mark Roboliu Kemakeza	Independent	Ngella	2006	Minister for Mines, Energy and Rural Electrification (Aug. 2010- )
Andrew Hanaria Keniasina	People's Congress Party	East ꞌAreꞌare	2010	no (Shadow Minister for Fisheries and Marine Resources, Aug. 2010- )
Gordon Darcy Lilo	Independent	Gizo-Kolombangara	2001	Minister for Finance and Development Planning (Aug. 2010- )
Varian Lonamei	Independent Democratic	Maringe-Kokota	2006	Minister for Aviation and Communication (Aug. 2010- )
Manasseh Maelanga	Democratic	East Malaita	2008	Deputy Prime Minister; Minister for Home Affairs (Aug. 2010- )
Martin Magga	People's Alliance	Temotu Pele	2006	no
John Maneniaru	Independent	West ꞌAreꞌare	2010	no (Shadow Minister for Commerce, Industry, Labour and Immigration, Aug. 2010- )
Samuel Manetoali	Rural and Urban	Gao-Bugotu	2006	Minister for Tourism and Culture (Aug. 2010- )
Commins Aston Mewa	Independent	Temotu Nende	2010	Minister for Justice and Legal Affairs (Aug. 2010- )
Elijah Doro Muala	National	South Choiseul	2010	Minister for Commerce, Industry, Labour and Immigration (Aug. 2010- )
Joseph Onika	Independent	North East Guadalcanal	2010	Minister for Women, Youth and Sports (Aug. 2010- )
David Day Pacha	Democratic	South Guadalcanal	2006	no (Shadow Minister for Mines, Energy and Rural Electrification, Aug. 2010- )
Dickson Mua Panakitasi	OUR Party	Savo-Russels	2010	no (Shadow Minister for Health and Medical Services, Aug. 2010- )
Danny Philip	Reformed Democratic	South New Georgia	2010 previously MP from 1984 to 2001	Prime Minister (Aug. 2010- )
Snyder Rini	Independent Democratic	Marovo	1997	Minister for Aid Coordination and Planning (Aug. 2010- )
Selwyn Riumana	Independent	Hograno-Kia-Havulei	2006	Minister for Agriculture and Livestock (Aug. 2010- )
Connelly Sandakabatu	Independent	North-West Choiseul	2010	no (Shadow Minister for Agriculture and Livestock, Aug. 2010- )
Charles Sigoto	Reformed Democratic	Ranonga-Simbo	2010	Minister for Health and Medical Services (Aug. 2010- )
Derek Sikua	Liberal	East Central Guadalcanal	2006	no
Stanley Festus Sofu	Democratic	East Kwaio	2006	Minister for Public Service (Dec. 2010- )
Manasseh Sogavare	OUR Party	East Choiseul	1997	no (Shadow Minister for Lands, Housing and Survey; Shadow Minister for National Planning and Aid Coordination, Aug. 2010- )
Martin Sopage	Independent	North Guadalcanal	2006	Minister for Lands, Housing and Survey (Aug. 2010- )
Hypolite Taremae	Independent	Central Makira	2010	Minister for Peace, Reconciliation and National Unity (Aug. 2010- )
Job Dudley Tausinga	Rural Advancement	North New Georgia	1984	no (Shadow Minister for Forestry, Aug. 2010- )
Silas Tausinga	Rural Advancement	West New Georgia	2010	no (Shadow Minister for Women, Youth and Children's Affairs, Aug. 2010- )
Peter Tom	Democratic	West Kwaio	2006	no (Shadow Minister for Home Affairs, Aug. 2010- )
James Tora	Democratic	Ulawa-Ugi	2004	Minister for Police and National Security (Aug. 2010- )
Bradley Tovosia	Independent	East Guadalcanal	2010	Minister for Provincial Government (Aug. 2010- )
Milna Tozaka	People's Alliance	North Vella Lavella	2006	no (Shadow Minister for Foreign Affairs and External Trade; Shadow Minister for Justice and Legal Affairs, Aug. 2010- )
Namson Tran	Independent	West Honiara	2010	no
Matthew Wale	Democratic	Aoke-Langalanga	2008	no (Deputy Leader of Opposition; Shadow Minister for Education and Human Resources Development; Shadow Minister for the Environment, Conservation and Meteorology, Aug. 2010- )
vacant	-	Baegu/Asifola	-	-
vacant	-	North Malaita	-	-
vacant	-	Shortlands	-	-

== Changes ==
- Steve Laore (Independent), MP for Shortlands, died on 25 August 2010, three weeks after the election. There was a by-election in Shortlands to determine his successor, on 30 March 2011. His brother Christopher Laore (Independent) succeeded him.
- Toswel Kaua (Independent), MP for Baegu-Asifola, died on 16 November 2010. There was a by-election in Baegu-Asifola to determine his successor, on 30 March 2011. David Tome (Independent) succeeded him.
- Jimmy Lusibaea (Independent), MP for North Malaita and Minister for Fisheries, lost his seat on 30 November 2010 upon being sentenced to two years and nine months in jail for assault and grievous bodily harm. On 20 January 2011, the Minister for Police, James Tora, remitted Lusibaea's sentence to one month, using his discretion as Minister under section 38 of the Correctional Service Act. Consequently, Lusibaea was no longer barred from occupying his seat, and resumed his functions in Parliament. On 17 October, the High Court ruled that the remit did not amount to a court-sanctioned reduction in sentence, and Lusibaea lost his seat once more. There was a by-election in North Malaita on 1 August 2012 to determine his successor. His wife Vika Lusibaea (Independent) succeeded him, becoming only the second woman ever to be elected to Parliament (following Hilda Kari in the 1990s).
- Andrew Hanaria (People's Congress Party), MP for East ꞌAreꞌare and Minister for Civil Aviation, had his election voided by the High Court on 7 December 2011. He was found to have bribed voters in his constituency with cash and material goods before the election. There was a by-election in East ꞌAreꞌare on 1 August 2012 to determine his successor. Andrew Manepora'a (party not specified) succeeded him.
- Mark Kemakeza (Independent), MP for Nggella, lost his seat in March 2012 upon being convicted of misuse of public funds and sentenced to fourteen months in jail. A by-election was held on 27 February 2013 to determine his successor; trade unionist and teacher Johnley Hatimoana was elected to replace him.
- Johnley Hatimoana, MP for Ngella, died suddenly of pneumonia on 18 April 2014. There was no by-election, as the next general election was only a few months away.
- Martin Magga (People's Alliance), MP for Temotu Pele, died after a long illness on 25 August 2014. As with Johnley Hatimoana, his death did not necessitate a by-election.

== Legislation ==
The following Acts were enacted under the Ninth Parliament.

- 2010 Supplementary Appropriation Act 2011
- 2011 Appropriation Act 2011
