= Peter Shannel Agovaka =

Solomon Islands politician (born 1959)

The Right Honourable Peter Shannel Agovaka MP
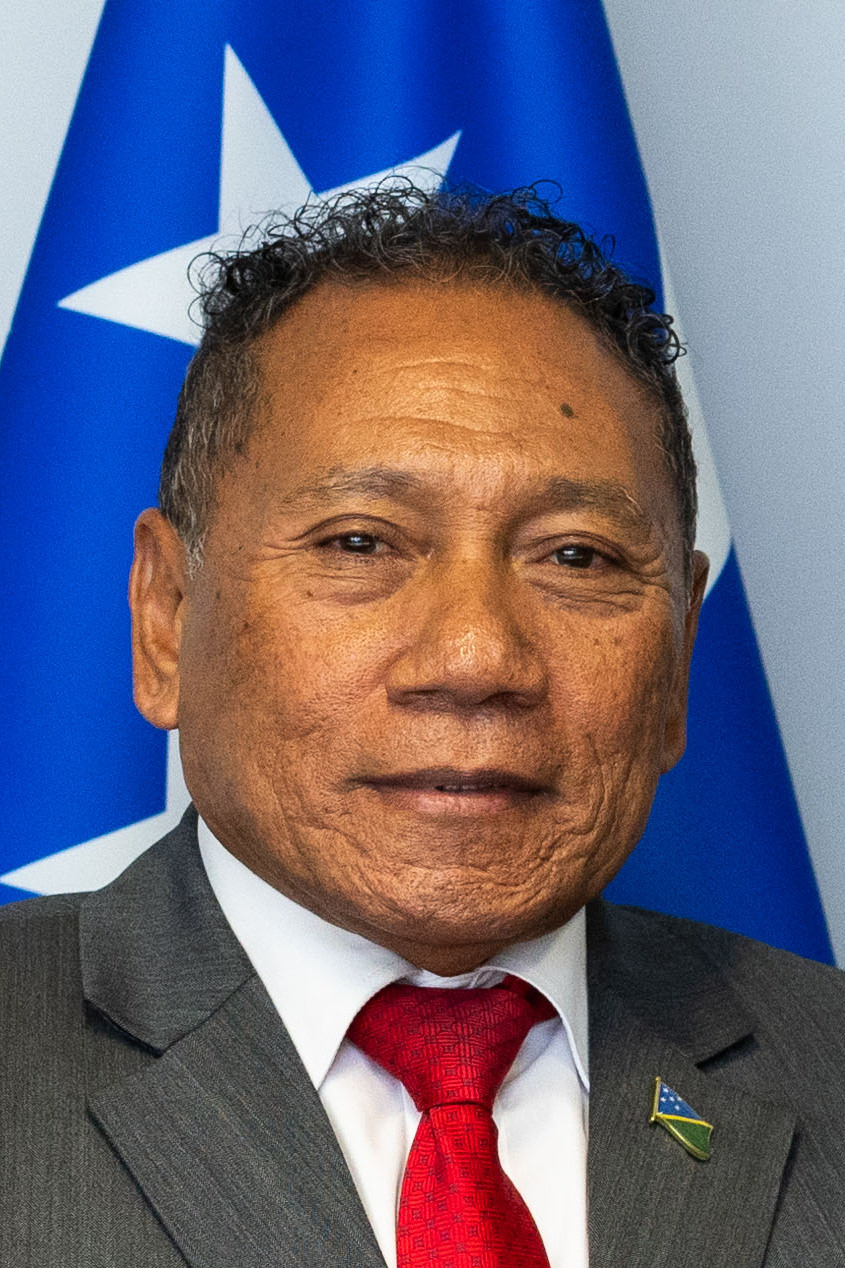
- Agovaka in 2025

Minister for Police, National Security and Correctional Services
- In office 23 December 2014 – 24 November 2017
- Prime Minister: Manasseh Sogavare
- Preceded by: Chris Laore
- Succeeded by: Moses Garu

Minister for Foreign Affairs and Trade Relations
- In office 7 May 2024 – 16 March 2026
- Prime Minister: Jeremiah Manele
- Preceded by: Jeremiah Manele
- Succeeded by: Jeremiah Manele (acting); Rick Houenipwela
- In office 27 August 2010 – 9 February 2012
- Prime Minister: Danny Philip; Gordon Darcy Lilo
- Preceded by: William Haomae
- Succeeded by: Clay Forau Soalaoi

Minister for Commerce, Industries and Employment
- In office 9 August 2006 – 21 December 2007
- Prime Minister: Manasseh Sogavare

Minister for Provincial Government and Constituency Development
- In office 21 April 2006 – 4 May 2006
- Prime Minister: Snyder Rini

Leader of the Independent Members
- In office January 2008 – 25 September 2008

Member of Parliament for Central Guadalcanal
- Incumbent
- Assumed office 5 April 2006
- Preceded by: Walton Naezon

Personal details
- Born: 1 November 1959 (age 67) Bemuta Village, Guadalcanal Province
- Party: Association of Independent Members, then Ownership, Unity and Responsibility Party (until 2014), then none

Peter Shannel Agovaka (born 1 November 1959) is a Solomon Islands politician.

He studied at Telecom College in Papua New Guinea, then at the North Sydney Institute of Engineering in Australia, before working as a Community Affairs Officer for Gold Ridge Mining Limited in Solomon Islands.

His career in national politics began when he was elected to Parliament as the member for Central Guadalcanal in the April 2006 general election. He was appointed Minister for Provincial Government and Constituency Development in Snyder Rini's government, but lost his Cabinet position when Rini resigned before a motion of no confidence in Parliament in May. In August, however, the new prime minister, Manasseh Sogavare, appointed him Minister for Commerce, Industries and Employment, a position he held until the Sogavare government was overthrown by a motion of no confidence in December 2007. Under Derek Sikua's ensuing premiership, Agovaka was, for a time, Leader of the Independent Members of Parliament, from January to September 2008.

In 2008, he was convicted and gaoled for nine months for assault and possession of an illegal weapon, and lost his seat in Parliament.

He resumed his seat in Parliament in the August 2010 general election, as a member of the newly formed Ownership, Unity and Responsibility Party, and was appointed Minister for Foreign Affairs and Trade Relations in Prime Minister Danny Philip's Cabinet. When Gordon Darcy Lilo replaced Philip as prime minister in November 2011, Agovaka retained his position in government. He was, however, sacked on 9 February 2012, after having, during a meeting with Russian Foreign Affairs Minister Sergei Lavrov in Fiji, "discussed the possibility of establishing diplomatic relations" between the two countries. Lilo wrote publicly to Shannel and told him he had breached "collective Cabinet responsibility": "As a developing country Solomon Islands should continue to strengthen our ties with traditional partners before pursuing new diplomatic groupings".

On 23 December 2014, following a general election, Agovaka was appointed Minister for Police by new prime minister Manasseh Sogavare.

Agovaka has also served on a number of parliamentary committees, and chaired the Constitution Review Committee from July 2009.

He was reappointed as foreign minister in Jeremiah Manele's cabinet in May 2024.
