= Milner Tozaka =

Solomon Islands diplomat and politician

The Right Honourable George Milner Tozaka MP
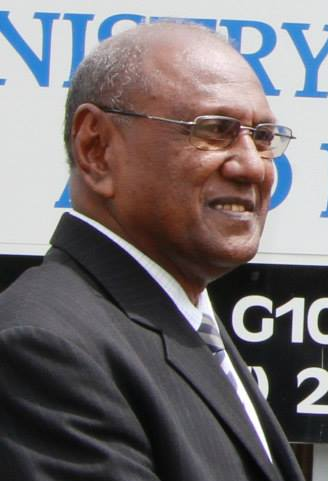

Minister for Foreign Affairs and External Trade
- In office 15 December 2014 – 23 April 2019
- Prime Minister: Manasseh Sogavare; Rick Houenipwela
- Preceded by: Clay Forau
- Succeeded by: Jeremiah Manele

Minister for Public Service
- In office December 2007 – 25 August 2010
- Prime Minister: Derek Sikua
- Preceded by: ?
- Succeeded by: Douglas Ete

Minister for Public Service
- In office 22 April 2006 – 5 May 2006
- Prime Minister: Snyder Rini

High Commissioner of Solomon Islands to Australia
- In office 2000–2005

Member of Parliament for North Vella Lavella
- Incumbent
- Assumed office 5 April 2006
- Preceded by: Danny Bula

Personal details
- Born: 21 October 1951 (age 74)
- Party: Independent, then People's Alliance Party

George Milner Tozaka OBE, better known as Milner Tozaka, (born 21 October 1951) is a Solomon Islands diplomat and politician.

== Education ==
After attending the Malanguna Technical College in Papua New Guinea in 1968-1969, he briefly studied at the University of Papua New Guinea in 1970-1971. He later resumed his studies and obtained a Bachelor of Arts degree from the University of the South Pacific in Fiji in 1992, followed by a Postgraduate Diploma in Management and Sociology from the same university the following year.

== Career ==
He entered government administration in the 1980s, serving as the chairman of the National Disaster Council from 1984 to 1985. In 1988, he began work as a consultant, first for the Public Service Reform Programme, then at the Ministry of Provincial Government. He was appointed chairman of the Provincial Government Review Committee in 1999.

In June 1996, he was appointed an Ordinary Officer of the Civil Division of the Order of the British Empire, by the Queen of the Solomon Islands Elizabeth II, "for public service".

In 2000, he was appointed High Commissioner for Solomon Islands to Australia, a position which he held until 2005. Upon his return to the Solomons, he entered politics, standing as an independent candidate in the North Vella Lavella constituency at the April 2006 general election. He was elected, and appointed Minister for Public Service in Prime Minister Snyder Rini's short-lived government from April to May. He then served in opposition, until Derek Sikua became Prime Minister in December 2007, whereupon he regained his position as Minister for Public Service. As Minister, he oversaw the Public Service Improvement Programme in coordination with the Australian-led Regional Assistance Mission to Solomon Islands. The programme, he said, would "streamline government recruitment, develop a code of conduct for all government workers and provide public servants with the tools to improve public services".

He was returned to Parliament in the August 2010 general election, this time representing the People's Alliance Party. (He saw off five candidates, obtaining 1,225 votes, and a 143-vote lead over his closest opponent.) He was appointed Shadow Minister for Foreign Affairs and External Trade and Shadow Minister for Justice and Legal Affairs in Opposition Leader Steve Abana's Shadow Cabinet.

In November 2011, when Prime Minister Danny Philip lost his parliamentary majority and resigned, Tozaka was the Opposition's candidate to replace him, standing against Gordon Darcy Lilo, a recently sacked government minister. He lost to Lilo, and remained on the Opposition benches.

On 15 December 2014, following a general election, Tozaka was appointed Minister for Foreign Affairs and External Trade by new Prime Minister Manasseh Sogavare. Tozaka retained his appointment as Foreign Minister following the replacement of Sogavare by Rick Houenipwela on 15 November 2017 and a subsequent cabinet reshuffle.

== See also ==
- List of foreign ministers in 2017
- List of current foreign ministers
