= Clay Forau Soalaoi =

Solomon Islands politician (born 1976)

The Right Honourable Clay Forau Soalaoi MP
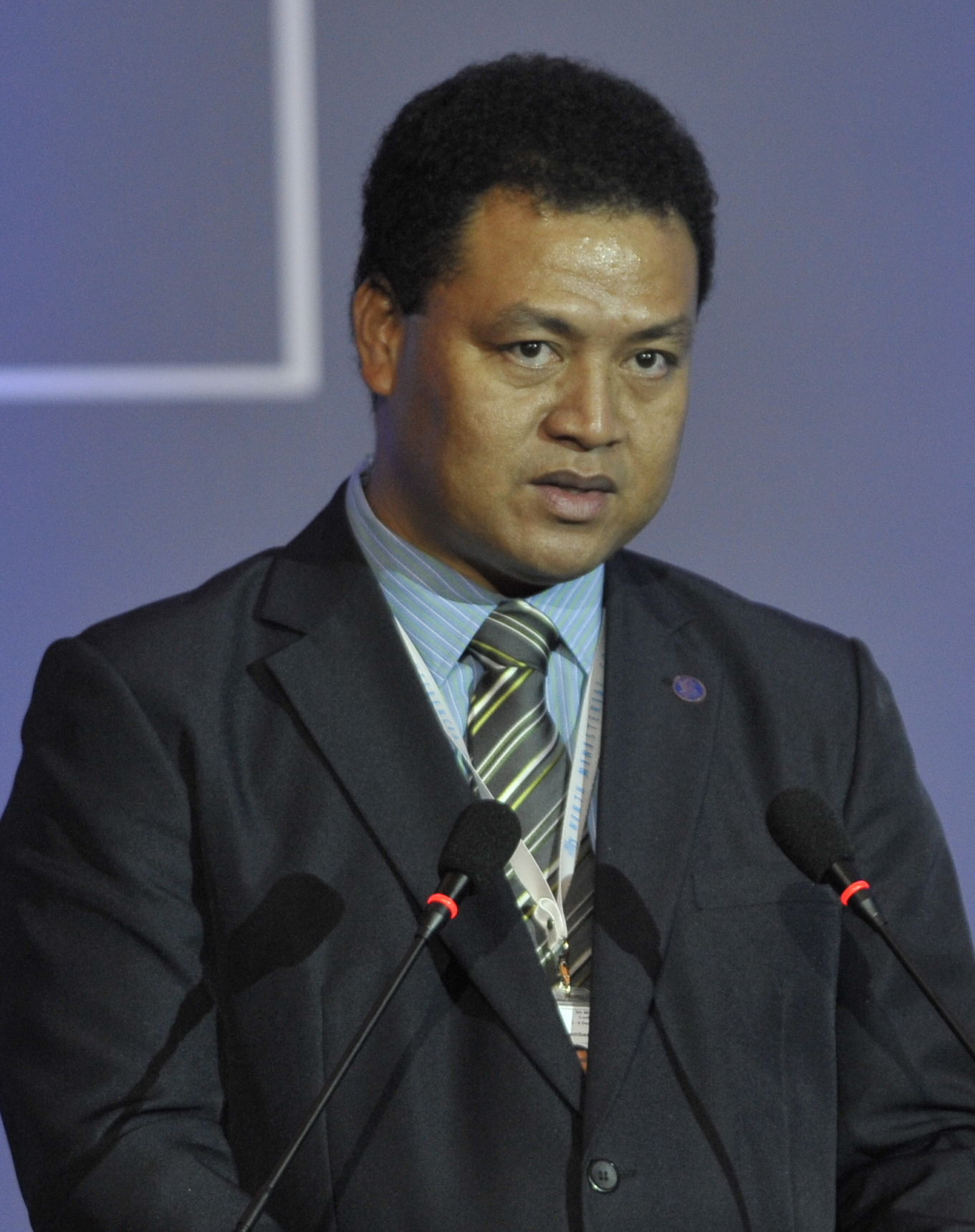
- Soalaoi in 2013

Minister for Foreign Affairs and External Trade
- In office 27 February 2012 – 15 December 2014
- Prime Minister: Gordon Darcy Lilo
- Preceded by: Peter Shannel Agovaka
- Succeeded by: Milner Tozaka

Minister for Police, National Security and Correctional Services
- In office 21 November 2011 – 27 February 2012
- Prime Minister: Gordon Darcy Lilo
- Preceded by: himself (prior to resignation)
- Succeeded by: David Tome
- In office 18 April 2011 – 9 November 2011
- Prime Minister: Danny Philip
- Preceded by: James Tora
- Succeeded by: himself (after 12-day vacancy)

Minister for Health and Medical Services
- In office 5 May 2006 – 21 December 2007
- Prime Minister: Manasseh Sogavare

Minister for Justice and Legal Affairs
- In office 22 April 2006 – 5 May 2006
- Prime Minister: Snyder Rini

Leader of the Independent Members
- In office 30 August 2010 – 7 April 2011

Member of Parliament for Temotu Vatud
- Incumbent
- Assumed office 5 April 2006
- Preceded by: Hudson Teava Rangissearofa

Personal details
- Born: 10 October 1976 (age 49) Namo Village, Tikopia
- Party: Social Credit Party, then People's Federation Party

Clay Forau Soalaoi, more commonly referred to as Clay Forau, (born 10 October 1976) is a Solomon Islands politician.

He was first elected to Parliament, representing the Temotu Vatud constituency, at the 2006 general election, in April. From 22 April to 5 May, he served briefly as Minister for Justice and Legal Affairs, under Prime Minister Snyder Rini. When Rini was forced to resign in the face of public protests and a motion of no confidence, Forau supported his successor Manasseh Sogavare, and was appointed Minister for Health and Medical Services. He was also a member of Sogavare's Social Credit Party. He held this position until December 2007, when Prime Minister Sogavare was himself ousted in a vote of no confidence and Derek Sikua named a new Cabinet.

In January 2008, he was appointed chairman of the Constitution Review Committee.

In June 2009, Forau replaced Martin Magga as Minister for Health and Medical Services. The latter was "relieved of his ministerial duties on medical grounds" after being hospitalized in Australia and placed on life support.

Retaining his seat in the August 2010 general election, in which he stood as a member of the People's Federation Party, he nonetheless lost his seat in Cabinet. Rather than join the Opposition, he was elected Leader of the Independent Members of Parliament on 30 August. In early April 2011, however, he relinquished this position to join the ranks of the government. Shortly thereafter, he was appointed Minister for Police, National Security and Correctional Services.

On 9 November 2011, he resigned and joined the Opposition, as part of a mass defection which brought down the Philip government two days later. Gordon Darcy Lilo replaced Philip as Prime Minister on 16 November, and reappointed Forau to his previous position five days later.

On 9 February 2012, Lilo sacked Peter Shannel Agovaka as Foreign Minister, for having publicly raised the possibility of establishing diplomatic relations with Russia without awaiting Lilo's approval. On 27 February, Lilo appointed Forau in his place.

Forau lives in Tikopia.
