= James Tora =

Solomon Islands politician (born 1956)

The Right Honourable James Tora MP

Minister for Police and Justice
- In office 17 February 2011 – 18 April 2011
- Prime Minister: Danny Philip
- Preceded by: himself, prior to vacancy
- Succeeded by: Clay Forau

Minister for Police and Justice
- In office 27 August 2010 – 25 January 2011
- Prime Minister: Danny Philip
- Preceded by: himself
- Succeeded by: himself, after vacancy

Minister for Police, National Security, and Correctional Services
- In office May 2009 – 27 August 2010
- Prime Minister: Derek Sikua
- Succeeded by: himself

Minister for Home Affairs
- In office 22 December 2007 – May 2009
- Prime Minister: Derek Sikua

Minister for Infrastructure and Development
- In office 20 April 2006 – 4 May 2006
- Prime Minister: Snyder Rini

Minister for Mines and Energy
- In office February 2006 – 20 April 2006
- Prime Minister: Sir Allan Kemakeza

Minister for National Reconciliation, Unity and Peace
- In office March 2005 – February 2006
- Prime Minister: Sir Allan Kemakeza

Member of Parliament for Ugi/Ulawa
- Incumbent
- Assumed office 1 December 2004
- Preceded by: Nathaniel Waena

Personal details
- Born: 16 July 1956 (age 69) Hunuta Village, Ugi Islands
- Party: Democratic Party

James Tora (born 16 July 1956 in Hunuta Village, Ugi Islands) is a Solomon Islands politician.

After studying at the Honiara Technical Institute, he worked as Supervising Manager for Student Welfare Services at the Solomon Islands College of Higher Education. He then began a career in national politics, when he stood successfully for Parliament in the 1 December 2004 by-election in the Ugi/Ulawa constituency. (The by-election was prompted by MP Nathaniel Waena's elevation to the post of Governor-General.) He was re-elected in the 2006 and 2010 general elections.

He first entered Cabinet in March 2005 when Prime Minister Sir Allan Kemakeza appointed him Minister for National Reconciliation, Unity and Peace, in the wake of the severe ethnic conflict on Guadalcanal. He held the post until February 2006, when he was appointed Minister for Mines and Energy. Following the April 2006 general election, he became Minister for Infrastructure and Development in Prime Minister Snyder Rini's short-lived Cabinet. Rini resigned the following month, under public pressure and in the face of an impending motion of no confidence, and Tora found himself on the Opposition benches, where he remained until Rini's successor, Manasseh Sogavare, was himself ousted in a vote of no confidence in December 2007. Tora supported new Prime Minister Derek Sikua, and was appointed Minister for Home Affairs. He held the post until May 2009, when he was transferred to the position of Minister for Police, National Security, and Correctional Services. He continued at that post after the August 2010 election, under newly elected Prime Minister Danny Philip.

On 25 January 2011, he followed several other ministers in resigning from government and joining Steve Abana's Opposition. Tora's defection gave Abana the support of twenty-five MPs to Philip's twenty-three, prompting the Opposition to call for Philip's resignation. The following month, however, Tora and several other defectors returned to the government, providing Philip with a solid majority once more. Tora resumed his position as Minister for Police.

On 18 April, Philip removed him from Cabinet in a reshuffle to make way for five Opposition members who had just joined the government ranks. Sofu was succeeded by Clay Forau.

In early November, Tora, along with several other former ministers who had lost their positions in that reshuffle, switched over to the Opposition again, and this time succeeded in bringing down the Philip government.
