= Red House (Solomon Islands) =

Coordinates: 09°26′04″S 159°57′28″E

Red House, located on Vavaea Ridge in Honiara, Solomon Islands, is the official residence of the Prime Minister of Solomon Islands. The residence is a single story wood siding building on stilts. The name of the home is in reference to the red colour roof.

== History ==
The house was built in the 1950s for the colonial Secretary for Finance and later Chief Minister of the British Solomon Islands. It became the Prime Minister's residence in 1978. Prior to re-occupation, it was used as residence for the Speaker of the National Parliament of Solomon Islands following the last renovations in 2010.

== Demolition plans and reversals ==
In October 2011, the National Coalition for Reform and Advancement government of former Prime Minister Danny Philip announced plans to demolish Red House and build a new Prime Minister's residence. The opposition, led by Derek Sikua, decried the announcement, noting that $4 million in renovations had been completed at Red House since August 2010.

In November 2011, newly elected Prime Minister Gordon Darcy Lilo reversed the previous government's plans. He announced that he would move into Red House from his residence at the Honiara Hotel, citing a need to spend less taxpayer money on hotel or home rentals for election officials. At a press conference, he announced, "I would like to inform the people of Solomon Islands that the Prime Minister will be moving back to the Red House as soon as a minor repair on the residence is complete... I do not intend to reside anywhere else, and wish to tell the people that this Prime Minister will be moving out and into the Red House in a matter of days." Lilo said he would take up residence as soon as minor repairs, such as new locks, were installed.
