= Stanley Festus Sofu =

Solomon Islands politician (born 1964)

The Right Honourable Stanley Festus Sofu MP
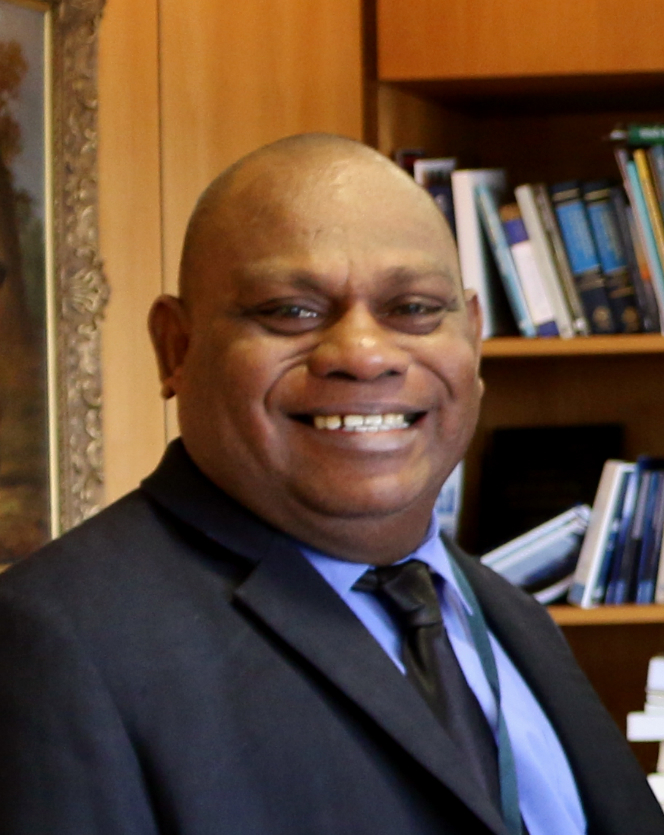
- Sofu in London in 2018

Minister for Public Service
- Incumbent
- Assumed office 22 October 2012
- Prime Minister: Gordon Darcy Lilo
- Preceded by: Bradley Tovosia

Minister for Public Service
- In office 20 February 2011 – 18 April 2011
- Prime Minister: Danny Philip
- Preceded by: himself, prior to vacancy
- Succeeded by: Ricky Houeniopwela

Minister for Public Service
- In office 8 December 2010 – 22 January 2011
- Prime Minister: Danny Philip
- Preceded by: Douglas Ete
- Succeeded by: himself, after vacancy

Minister for Infrastructure and Development
- In office 21 December 2007 – 27 August 2010
- Prime Minister: Derek Sikua
- Succeeded by: Jackson Fiulaua

Minister for Infrastructure and Development
- In office 5 May 2006 – 10 November 2007
- Prime Minister: Manasseh Sogavare

Member of Parliament for East Kwaio
- Incumbent
- Assumed office 5 April 2006
- Preceded by: Alfred Solomon Sasako

Personal details
- Born: 1964 (age 61–62) Fataolo Village, Malaita Province
- Party: Democratic Party

Stanley Festus Sofu (born 1964 in Fataolo Village, Malaita Province) is a Solomon Islands politician.

He attended the Honiara Technical Institute from 1981 to 1985, followed by management courses, before working as a heavy plant mechanic. He then obtained a position as a works officer, and eventually as principal works officer, before going into politics. He began his political career as a member of the Provincial Assembly of Malaita Province, becoming Deputy Premier and Education Minister for the Province, before moving on to national politics.

His career in national politics began when he was elected to Parliament as the member for East Kwaio in the April 2006 general election. When Snyder Rini's government was forced to resign in the face of public protests and a motion of no confidence in May, the new prime minister, Manasseh Sogavare, appointed Sofu to Cabinet as Minister for Infrastructure and Development. In November 2007, Sofu joined the Opposition and left the Cabinet, but regained a Cabinet position when Sogavare's government was ousted by a motion of no confidence in December. Sogavare's successor, Derek Sikua, returned Sofu to his post as Minister for Infrastructure and Development, which he then held until August 2010.

He retained his seat in Parliament in the August 2010 general election. As a member of the Democratic Party, led by Opposition Leader Steve Abana, he served initially as an Opposition frontbencher; Abana appointed him Shadow Minister for Infrastructure Development. In December, however, in a Cabinet reshuffle prompted by the sacking of two ministers, Sofu defected to the government and was promoted to Cabinet as Minister for Public Service. The following month, he defected back to the Opposition, two days after four other ministers had moved to the Opposition. On February 20, he defected to the government once more, following four other MPs who had moved from the Opposition to the government in the preceding days. He was restored to his position as Minister for Public Service.

On April 18, Philip removed him from Cabinet in a reshuffle to make way for five Opposition members who had just joined the government ranks. Sofu was succeeded by Ricky Houeniopwela, who like him was formally aligned with the Democratic Party.

When Gordon Darcy Lilo became prime minister in November 2011, Sofu sat on the government backbenches. On 22 October 2012, he was promoted to the position of Minister for Public Service, as part of a Cabinet reshuffle.
