= Minister of Foreign Affairs (Solomon Islands) =

This is a list of foreign ministers of Solomon Islands.

- 1978–1981: Peter Kenilorea
- 1981–1982: Ezekiel Alebua
- 1982............ Michael Evo (acting)
- 1982–1984: Dennis Carlos Lulei
- 1984–1985: George Talasasa
- 1985–1988: Paul Tovua
- 1988–1989: Sir Peter Kenilorea
- 1989–1990: Sir Baddeley Devesi
- 1990–1993: Sir Peter Kenilorea
- 1993–1994: Job Tausinga
- 1994–1995: Francis Saemala
- 1995–1996: Danny Philip
- 1996–1997: David Sitai
- 1997–2000: Patteson Oti
- 2000–2001: Danny Philip
- 2001............ David Sitai
- 2001–2002: Alex Bartlett
- 2002............ Nollen Leni
- 2002–2006: Laurie Chan
- 2006–2007: Patteson Oti
- 2007–2010: William Haomae
- 2010–2012: Peter Shanel Agovaka
- 2012–2014: Clay Forau Soalaoi
- 2014–2019: Milner Tozaka
- 2019–2024: Jeremiah Manele
- 2024–2026: Peter Shannel Agovaka
- 2026............ Jeremiah Manele (acting)
- 2026-present: Rick Houenipwela

== Sources ==
- Rulers.org – Foreign ministers S–Z
