= Dickson Mua =

Solomon Islands politician (born 1972)

The Right Honourable Dickson Mua MP

Minister for Forestry
- Incumbent
- Assumed office 28 October 2011
- Prime Minister: Danny Philip (until 16 November 2011); then Gordon Darcy Lilo
- Preceded by: Bradley Tovosia

Minister for Women, Youth, Children and Family Affairs
- In office 18 April 2011 – 28 October 2011
- Prime Minister: Danny Philip
- Preceded by: Joseph Onika
- Succeeded by: Peter Tom

Member of Parliament for Savo-Russels
- Incumbent
- Assumed office 4 August 2010
- Preceded by: Sir Allan Kemakeza

Personal details
- Born: November 4, 1972 (age 53)
- Party: OUR Party

Dickson Mua Panakitasi, primarily known as Dickson Mua (born 4 November 1972), is a Solomon Islands politician.

== Biography and career ==
Having obtained a diploma in English and Social Studies from the Solomon Islands College of Higher Education, he worked as the principal of a secondary school before entering politics.

He was first elected to the National Parliament of Solomon Islands as MP for Savo-Russels, a constituency in Central Province, in the August 2010 general election, standing as a member of Manasseh Sogavare's Ownership, Unity and Responsibility Party ("OUR Party"). He attracted attention by defeating the incumbent, veteran politician Sir Allan Kemakeza, who had been seeking a sixth term in Parliament. Mua sat as a member of the Opposition; Opposition leader Steve Abana appointed him Shadow Minister for Health and Medical Services.

In early April 2011, Abana, who had just been ousted from the opposition's leadership, defected to the government, bringing with him several other members of the opposition, including Mua. A cabinet reshuffle took place on 18 April; six ministers were removed to make way for the newcomers and shore up the parliamentary majority of Prime Minister Danny Philip. Mua was appointed Minister for Women, Youth, Children and Family Affairs. As minister, he co-organised the participation of ten Solomon Islanders in "an eight weeks course on gender at Flinders University" in Australia. In October, he was reshuffled to the position of Minister for Forest and Research.

In July 2012, Mua was criticised by Opposition leader Dr. Derek Sikua for having renewed the logging licence of the Earth Movers Logging Company. Sikua alleged that Mua had done so under pressure from the Prime Minister and in contravention to the Attorney General's advice. Mua denied the claim, saying he had acted on the basis of his own judgment, and accused the Opposition of spreading misinformation. In November, he was criticised for approving the release of public funds to a tourism project operated by his wife. He replied that he had approved funds for all six projects that had applied for funding in his constituency, noting that "to say the projects all went to my relatives and or close friends was not true”.
