= Leader of the Opposition (Solomon Islands) =

In the Solomon Islands, the Leader of the Official Opposition is the leader of the largest political party in the National Parliament that is not in government. The title of "Leader of the Opposition" is common to the Commonwealth realms and several other Commonwealth countries, though in Solomon Islands it is specifically defined by the Constitution. The Leader of the Opposition appoints and leads a Shadow Cabinet. The current Leader of the Opposition, since May 2026, is Manasseh Sogavare.

== Constitutional provisions ==
The position of "Leader of the Official Opposition" is established by article 66 of the Constitution of 1978, which has been the country's Constitution since independence. Article 66 states that the Leader of the Opposition is appointed by the Governor-General, who chooses the Member of Parliament who is considered leader by a significant opposition group within Parliament. In practice, this means the Leader of the Opposition is elected by the members of the Opposition, and then formally recognised and appointed by the Governor-General. The Leader of the Opposition is dismissed by the Governor-General if they no longer enjoys the support of the Opposition.

Article 66 also provides for the Governor-General to appoint a Leader of the Independent Members – i.e., a parliamentary leader of Members of Parliament who remain unaligned with the government or with the Opposition.

== List ==
The following have served as Leaders of the Official Opposition in Solomon Islands. (Given the fluctuating nature of majority coalitions, successful motions of no confidence and thus changes in government are frequent during a parliamentary term. Consequently, there are in most cases several successive Leaders of the Opposition during a single Parliament.)

Steve Abana of the Democratic Party became Leader of the Opposition on 30 August 2010, following the 2010 general election. He resigned from that position in late March 2011, and the Opposition chose Derek Sikua to replace him. Sikua thus led the 2011-2014 Shadow Cabinet.

On 9 December 2014, following the 2014 general election, Jeremiah Manele was appointed as Leader of the Opposition. He held that post until 17 November 2017. In 2018, Manasseh Maelanga was Leader of the Opposition. And following the April 2019 general election, the Leader of the Opposition is Matthew Wale.

Parliament	Leaders of the Opposition	Constituency	Political party	Prime Ministers
First (1976–1980)	Bartholomew Ulufa’alu	East Honiara		Sir Peter Kenilorea
Second (1980–1984)	Solomon Mamaloni, then Sir Peter Kenilorea	West Makira; East 'Are'are		Sir Peter Kenilorea, then Solomon Mamaloni
Third (1984–1988)	Solomon Mamaloni	West Makira		Sir Peter Kenilorea, then Ezekiel Alebua
Fourth (1989–1993)	Andrew Nori, then Joses Tuhanuku	West 'Are'are; Rennell-Bellona		Solomon Mamaloni
Fifth (1994–1997)	Solomon Mamaloni, then Baddley Devesi, then Edward Huni’ehu	West Makira; North-East Guadalcanal; East 'Are'are		Francis Billy Hilly, then Solomon Mamaloni
Sixth (1997–2001)	Solomon Mamaloni, then Manasseh Sogavare, then Bartholomew Ulufa'alu	West Makira; East Choiseul; Aoke-Langalanga		Bartholomew Ulufa'alu, then Manasseh Sogavare
Seventh (2001–2005)	Patteson Oti, then John Garo, then Francis Billy Hilly	Temotu Nende; West Kwaio; Ranonga-Simbo		Sir Allan Kemakeza
Eighth (2006–2010)	Mannasseh Sogavare	East Choiseul		Snyder Rini, then Manasseh Sogavare, then Derek Sikua
Ninth (2010–2014)	Steve Abana, then Derek Sikua	Fataleka; East Central Guadalcanal	Democratic; Liberal	Danny Philip, then Gordon Darcy Lilo
Tenth (2014-2018)	Jeremiah Manele, then Manasseh Maelanga	Hograno-Kia-Havulei	Democratic Alliance	Manasseh Sogavare
Eleventh (2018 to present)	Matthew Wale, then Manasseh Sogavare	Aoke/Langalanga	Democratic Party	Manasseh Sogavare

== See also ==
- Shadow Cabinet of Solomon Islands
- Prime Minister of Solomon Islands
- Leader of the Opposition (United Kingdom)
- Westminster system
