= Charles Sigoto =

Solomon Islands politician (born 1957)

The Right Honourable Charles Sigoto MP
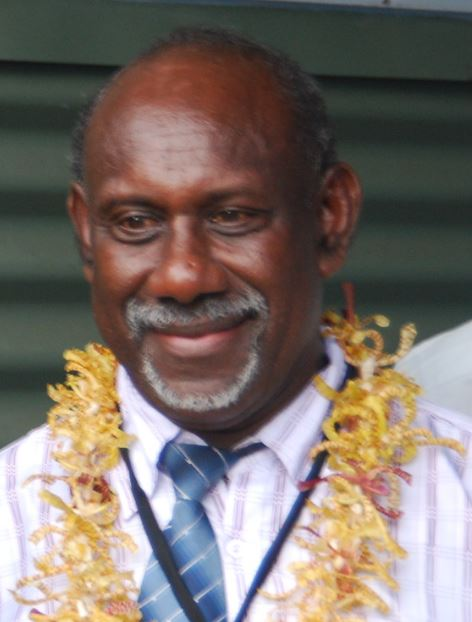
- Sigoto in 2010

Minister of Health and Medical Services
- Incumbent
- Assumed office 27 August 2010
- Prime Minister: Danny Philip (until 16 November 2011); then Gordon Darcy Lilo

Member of Parliament for Rannonga/Simbo
- Incumbent
- Assumed office 4 August 2010
- Preceded by: Francis Billy Hilly

Personal details
- Born: February 11, 1957 (age 69)
- Party: Solomon Islands Democratic Party

Charles Sigoto (born February 11, 1957) is a Solomon Islands politician.

He was born in Koriovuku Village, Ranongga Island, Western Province. After graduating from the College of Allied Health Sciences in Papua New Guinea, he worked as a director of nursing.

His career in national politics began when he was elected to Parliament as the member for the Rannonga/Simbo constituency in the 2010 general election, standing for the Reformed Democratic Party. He was then appointed Minister of Health and Medical Services in Prime Minister Danny Philip's Cabinet. When Gordon Darcy Lilo replaced Philip as Prime Minister in November 2011, Sigoto retained his position in government.

He was re-elected as a Member of Parliament for Rannogga/Simbo in the 2019 general election.
