= Jeremiah Manele =

Prime Minister of Solomon Islands from 2024 to 2026

The Honourable Jeremiah Manele MP
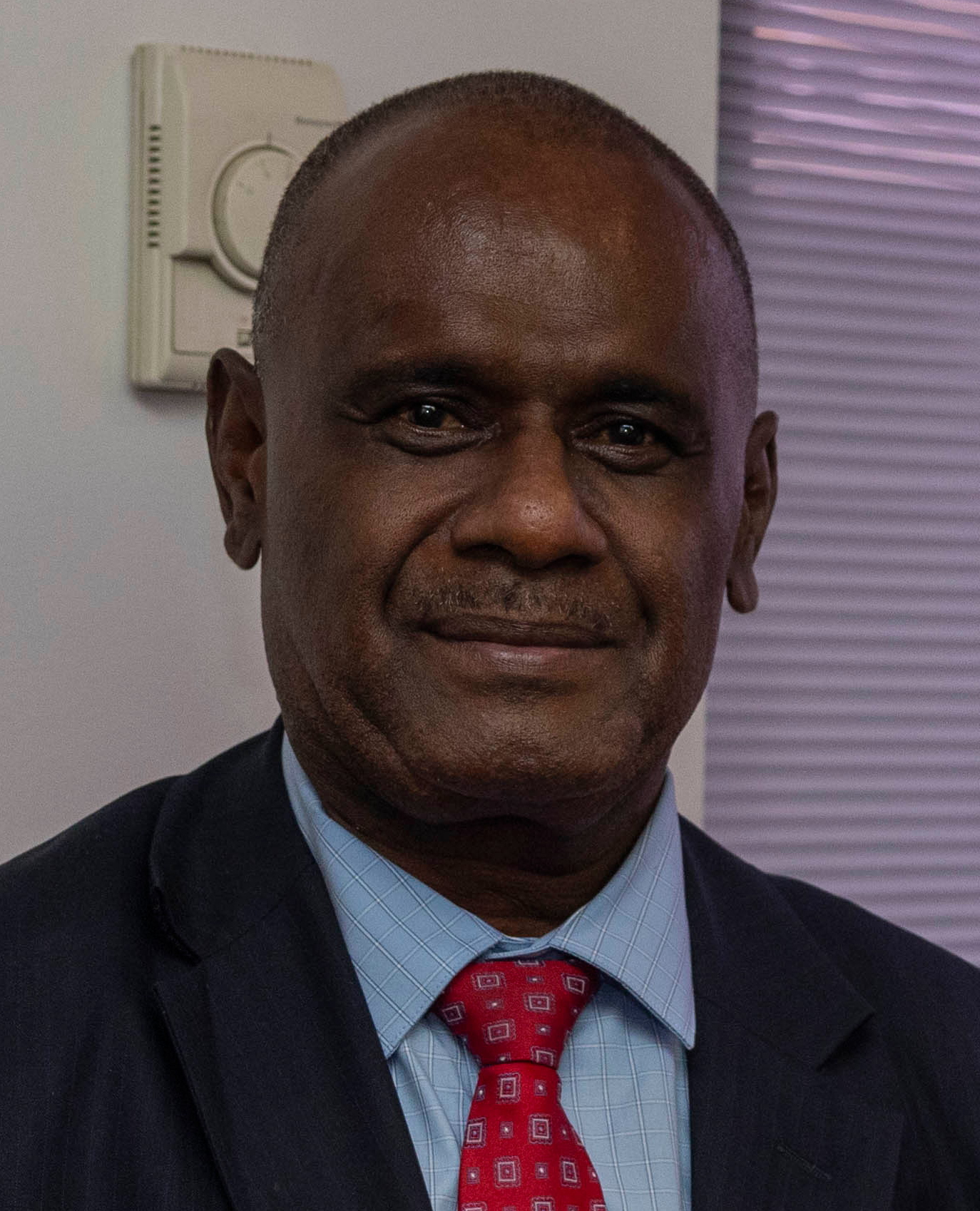
- Manele in 2026

Prime Minister of Solomon Islands
- In office 2 May 2024 – 15 May 2026
- Monarch: Charles III
- Governors-General: Sir David Vunagi; Sir David Tiva Kapu
- Deputy: Bradley Tovosia; Fredrick Kologeto; Manasseh Sogavare
- Preceded by: Manasseh Sogavare
- Succeeded by: Matthew Wale

Leader of OUR Party
- Incumbent
- Assumed office 29 April 2024
- Preceded by: Manasseh Sogavare

Minister of Foreign Affairs
- In office 25 April 2019 – 2 May 2024
- Prime Minister: Manasseh Sogavare
- Preceded by: Milner Tozaka
- Succeeded by: Peter Shannel Agovaka

Leader of the Opposition
- In office 17 December 2014 – 24 November 2017
- Preceded by: Derek Sikua
- Succeeded by: Manasseh Maelanga

Member of Parliament; for Hograno/Kia/Havulei
- Incumbent
- Assumed office December 2014

Personal details
- Born: 1968 (age 57–58)
- Party: OUR Party (since 2019)
- Other political affiliations: Democratic Alliance Party (until 2019)
- Education: University of Papua New Guinea

Jeremiah Manele (born 1968) is a Solomon Islands politician who served as prime minister of Solomon Islands between 2024 and 2026. He was the first prime minister of the country to come from Isabel Province.

== Early life and education ==
Manele grew up in the village of Samasodu on the island of Santa Isabel. His high school education began at a Guadalcanal Anglican school, Selwyn College (where he later taught), before completing his year 6 at King George VI School in Honiara. He studied for a Bachelor of Arts in Politics and Public Administration at the University of Papua New Guinea, graduating in 1991. He returned to studies briefly in 1995–96, completing post graduate work at the University of Oxford.

== Civil service ==
In the start of his career, Manele represented the Solomon Islands as a career diplomat. He was appointed to diplomatic postings as Counsellor and later Charge d'Affaires of the Solomon Islands Permanent Mission to the United Nations in New York.

Afterwards, he held senior government positions, serving as the Permanent Secretary of the Ministry of Development Planning, Secretary to the Prime Minister and Cabinet, and Permanent Secretary to the Ministry of Foreign Affairs and External Trade. He also served as Secretary to the Solomon Islands Government-RAMSI Intervention Taskforce.

== Politics ==
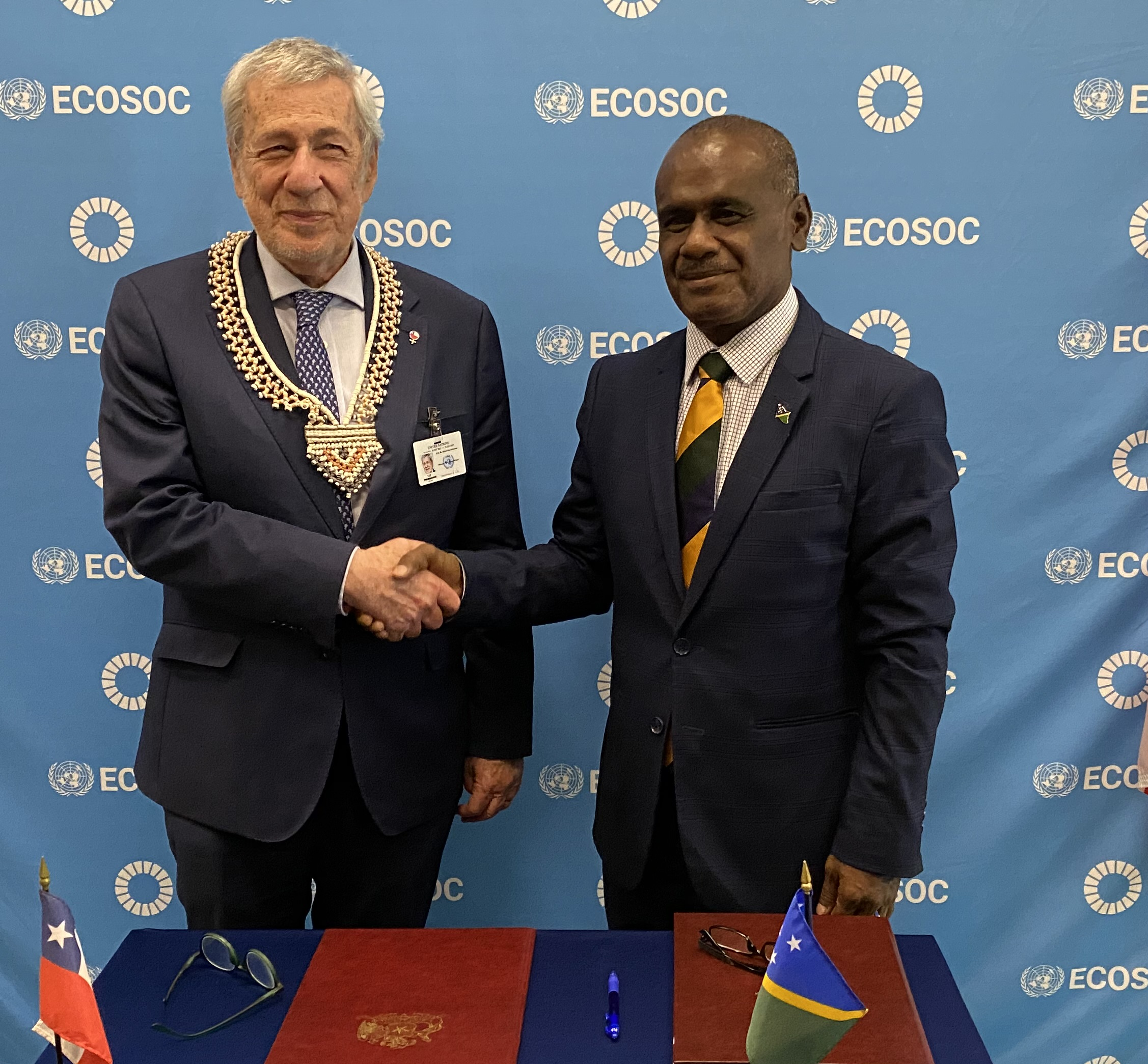
Then foreign minister, Manele is seen meeting with his counterpart from Chile, at the UN General Assembly in 2023

Manele was first elected to parliament in 2014, representing the division of Hograno-Kia-Havulei. Following the election, the Solomon Islands People's Democratic Coalition, made up of the Democratic Alliance, the Solomon Islands Party for Rural Advancement (SIPRA) and the People First Party (PFP), nominated Manele for prime minister. Manele was defeated in the 9 December parliamentary vote by Manasseh Sogavare, earning 19 votes to Sogavare's 31. Early in his Parliamentary career, he was the leader of the opposition in the 10th Parliament of Solomon Islands. He later joined government benches, serving as the Minister for Development Planning and Aid Coordination (2017–2018). He was re-elected in the 2019 general election and served as the minister for development planning and aid coordination in the 11th Parliament. Subsequently, Manele was made minister of foreign affairs on 25 April 2019, travelling widely in the role. Later that year, he travelled to Beijing to formalise relations between the Solomon Islands and the People's Republic of China. In this role, Manele signed a security pact with China on 30 March 2022, though at the time, the details of the pact were not publicly known.

=== Prime minister ===
In the 2024 Solomon Islands general election, Manele retained his seat under the banner of the Ownership, Unity and Responsibility Party, though he had previously been affiliated with the Democratic Alliance Party. The party was unable to form an outright majority, and could not form a working coalition under its existing leader, Manasseh Sogavare. Following the election, OUR Party renewed alliances with the Kadere and People First parties, forming the Coalition for National Unity and Transformation. Manele became OUR Party leader on 29 April, after Sogavare stepped down from role and declined to seek another term as prime minister. In a secret parliamentary ballot for prime minister on 2 May, Manele won 31 votes, defeating Matthew Wale. That day, he was invited to form a government by Governor-General David Vunagi, and was sworn in as the prime minister.

He is described as China-friendly as he had pledged to continue the Solomon Islands' international policy that drew it closer to China. At the time of becoming prime minister, Western analysts, such as Meg Keen at the Lowy Institute, assessed that Manele would be a "less fiery and combative leader for the West to manage but he will continue to pursue close relations with China". Manele's cabinet was sworn in on three different ceremonies, with the first 11 assuming office on 4 May. Manele appointed Bradley Tovosia deputy prime minister while Sogavare became finance minister.

=== No confidence motions ===
In December 2024, Central Honiara MP and former Prime Minister Gordon Darcy Lilo introduced a motion of no confidence. Lilo later withdrew the motion due to a lack of support.

On 28 April 2025, Lilo introduced a second no confidence motion. The motion follows political instability, including the resignation announcement of Deputy Prime Minister Bradley Tovosia and reports of cabinet ministers defecting to the opposition. The motion was moved Parliament around 6 May. Lilo later withdrew the second no confidence motion due to a similar lack of support.

A third motion of no confidence was filed on 16 March 2026 after cabinet members from the PFP, the Our Party, Kandere, and U4C collectively resigned. Cases launched by the opposition in the High Court and the Court of Appeal over the refusal to convene Parliament resulted in Manele being ordered to call the Parliament back by 7 May 2026. Manele went on to lose the motion by 22 votes to 26.

== Personal life ==
Together with his wife Joycelyn, Manele has four daughters and two sons.

Political offices
Preceded by Milner Tozaka	Minister of Foreign Affairs; 2019–2024	Succeeded by Peter Shannel Agovaka
Preceded by Manasseh Sogavare	Prime Minister of Solomon Islands; 2024–2026	Succeeded by Matthew Wale
Party political offices
Preceded by Manasseh Sogavare	Leader of the Ownership, Unity and Responsibility Party; 2024–present	Incumbent
