= Laurie Chan =

Solomon Islands politician (born 1965)

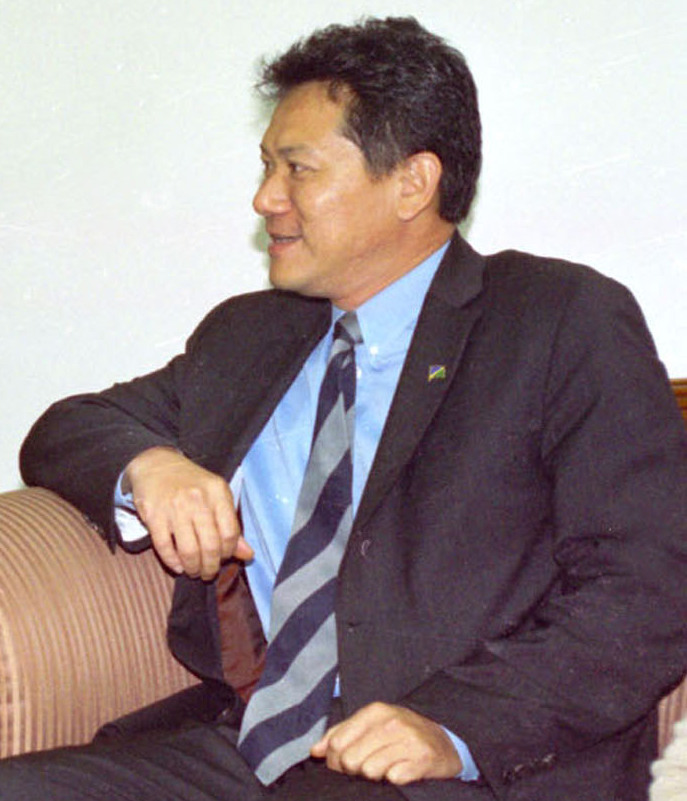
Chan in 2005

Laurie Hok Si Chan (simplified Chinese: 陈学仕; traditional Chinese: 陳學仕; pinyin: Chén Xuéshì; born April 6, 1965) is a politician and diplomat from the Solomon Islands. He served as Minister for Foreign Affairs from 2002 to 2006 and served in the National Parliament as MP for West Guadalcanal Constituency from 2001 to 2010. In May 2009, he was named Minister of Justice and Legal Affairs in Prime Minister Derek Sikua's government, and was fired from this same position in April 2010.

Chan was first elected to the National Parliament in the December 2001 election and served as Minister for Finance and Treasury from March 30, 2002, until December 8, 2002. He was appointed Minister for Foreign Affairs on December 12, 2002, and served in that position until May 5, 2006, when he was removed from office following the resignation of Snyder Rini as Prime Minister on April 26, 2006.

Chan's father, businessman Thomas Koh Chan (陳國強) and leader of the Association of Independent Members party, has been accused of helping bring Rini to power through bribery.

Chan was a member of the Bills and Legislation Committee in Parliament from May 2006 until the end of his term in 2010.

He did not stand as a candidate to defend his seat in the August 2010 general election, standing down from Parliament. Moses Garu succeeded him as MP for West Guadalcanal.

In 2011, he was appointed as ambassador to Taiwan. The Solomons are one of the few countries to recognise the Republic of China rather than the People's Republic of China, and Chan had supported continued relations with Taiwan when he was Minister for Foreign Affairs. He began to serve as ambassador on 21 March 2012.
