= Lionel Alex =

Solomon Islands politician (born 1971)

The Right Honourable Lionel Alex MP

Minister for Rural Development and Indigenous Affairs
- Incumbent
- Assumed office 27 August 2010
- Prime Minister: Danny Philip (until 16 November 2011); then Gordon Darcy Lilo

Member of Parliament for South Vella La Vella
- Incumbent
- Assumed office 4 August 2010
- Preceded by: Trevor Olavae

Personal details
- Born: 12 April 1971 (age 55) Maravari, Western Province
- Party: Independent

Lionel Alex (born 12 April 1971 in Maravari Village, Vella La Vella Island, Western Province) is a Solomon Islands politician.

After graduating from the Solomon Islands College of Higher Education, he worked as a surveyor before entering politics. His career in national politics began when he was elected to Parliament as the member for South Vella La Vella in the August 2010 general election, standing as an independent candidate. He was then appointed Minister for Rural Development and Indigenous Affairs in Prime Minister Danny Philip's Cabinet. When Gordon Darcy Lilo replaced Philip as Prime Minister in November 2011, Alex retained his position in government.
