= NCRA =

NCRA is an initialism which may stand for:

- National Centre for Radio Astrophysics, a premier Radio Astronomy research institute in Pune, India
- National Campus and Community Radio Association, a non-profit association of campus radio and community radio stations in Canada
- National Coalition for Reform and Advancement, a political coalition in the Solomon Islands
- National Cooperative Refinery Association, an energy cooperative in Kansas, US
- National Court Reporters Association, a US organization committed to advancing the profession of court reporting
- North Coast Railroad Authority, a US organization to restore and preserve rail service along the Northwestern Pacific rail line.
- Northern California Recycling Association, an environmental organization in California, US
- Nottinghamshire County Rowing Association, an elite rowing organization from Nottingham, England (1981-2006)
