= William Haomae =

Solomon Islands politician (born 1960)

William Ni'i Haomaepia (born November 26, 1960) is a politician of the Solomon Islands who has been Minister for Foreign Affairs and External Trade since December 2007. He has served in the National Parliament of the Solomon Islands since 1993 as MP for Small Malaita.

Haomae was first elected to the National Parliament from Small Malaita in May 1993. He was Minister for Culture, Tourism and Aviation from 1994 to August 5, 1997, and he was re-elected to his parliamentary seat in August 1997. Under Prime Minister Manasseh Sogavare, he became Minister for Police and Justice on July 2, 2000; he subsequently became Deputy Prime Minister and Caretaker Minister for National Unity, Reconciliation and Peace on August 13, 2001, remaining in that post until December 2001. He was re-elected to Parliament in December 2001 and April 2006, and he served as Minister for Police and National Security in the short-lived government of Prime Minister Snyder Rini from April 21, 2006, to May 4, 2006.

On May 16, 2006, Haomae was named by Opposition Leader Fred Fono as Opposition Spokesman for Police and National Security in the shadow cabinet, remaining in that post until December 2007. He was one of the MPs who nominated Derek Sikua as prime minister in the latter month, and following Sikua's victory Haomae was sworn in as Minister for Foreign Affairs and External Trade on December 22, 2007.
