= Douglas Ete =

Solomon Islands politician (born 1964)

The Right Honourable Douglas Ete MP
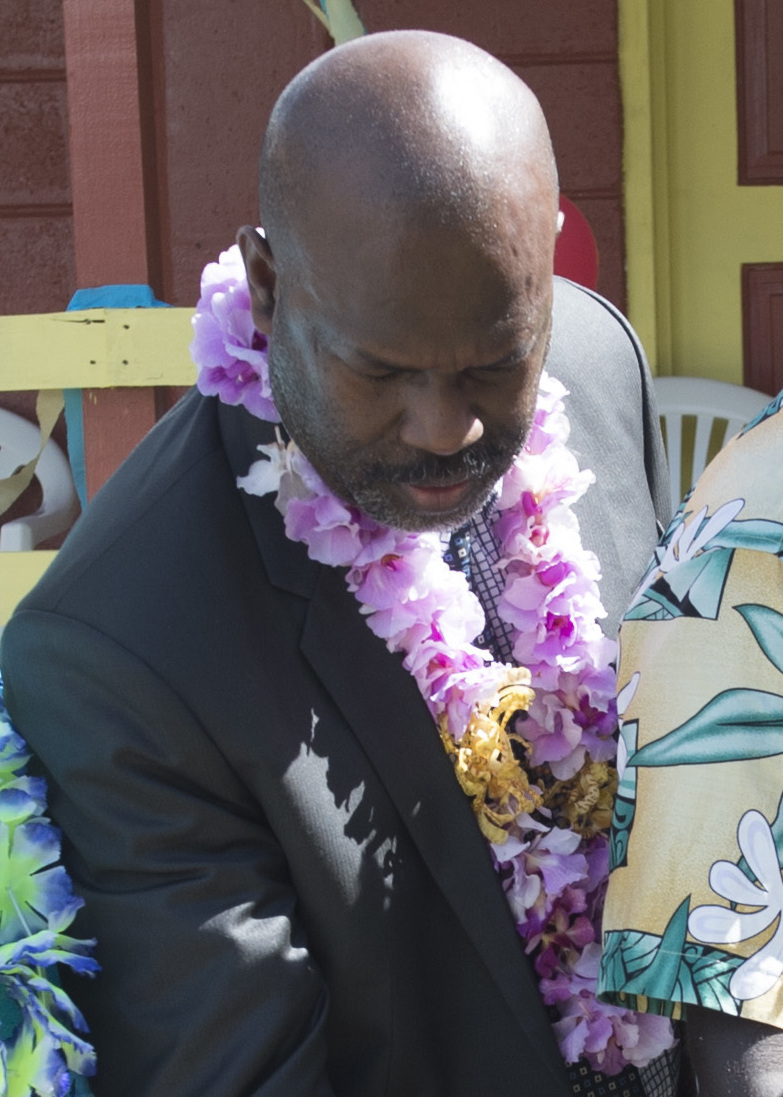
- Ete in 2015

Deputy Prime Minister Minister for Home Affairs
- Incumbent
- Assumed office 15 December 2014
- Prime Minister: Manasseh Sogavare
- Preceded by: Manasseh Maelanga

Minister for Forestry
- In office 8 December 2010 – 20 January 2011
- Prime Minister: Danny Philip
- Preceded by: Bodo Dettke
- Succeeded by: Bradley Tovosia

Minister of Public Service
- In office 27 August 2010 – 8 December 2010
- Prime Minister: Danny Philip
- Succeeded by: Stanley Sofu

Member of Parliament for East Honiara
- Incumbent
- Assumed office 4 August 2010
- Preceded by: Silas Milikada

Personal details
- Born: 4 August 1964 (age 62)
- Party: Reformed Democratic Party (until 2014, then) none
- Education: University of the South Pacific; Massey University

Douglas Ete (born 4 August 1964) is a Solomon Islands politician.

After studying at the University of the South Pacific and at Massey University (New Zealand), he worked as Chief Executive Officer at the National Referral Hospital in Solomon Islands.

His career in national politics began when he was elected to Parliament as the member for East Honiara in the 4 August 2010 general election, standing for the Reformed Democratic Party. He was then appointed Minister of Public Service in Prime Minister Danny Philip's Cabinet. A Cabinet reshuffle on 8 December 2010, after the sacking of two ministers, saw Ete promoted Minister of Forestry.

On 20 January 2011, Ete resigned from Cabinet, citing dissatisfaction with the Cabinet being "manipulated by one or two people", and joined Steve Abana's Opposition.

A few days later, he claimed to have been shot at in Honiara, at night, along with Bodo Dettke (a fellow MP who had also left the government) and said he had been "targeted for having left the government". The police investigated the incident, but stated Ete and Dettke had not been present at the scene of the shooting, and had therefore not been shot at. The police then released a media statement describing Dettke and Ete's claim as "incorrect and misleading".

On 15 December 2014, following a general election, Ete was appointed Deputy Prime Minister and Minister for Home Affairs by new Prime Minister Manasseh Sogavare.
