= John Garo =

Solomon Islands politician (1952–2007)

The Right Honourable John Garo MP

Minister of State assisting the Prime Minister
- In office 8 July 2004 – 4 April 2006
- Prime Minister: Sir Allan Kemakeza

Leader of the Opposition
- In office 26 May 2003 – 7 July 2004
- Preceded by: Patteson Oti
- Succeeded by: Francis Billy Hilly

Member of Parliament for West Kwaio
- In office 5 December 2001 – 4 April 2006
- Preceded by: George Luilamo
- Succeeded by: Peter Tom

Personal details
- Born: 29 January 1952 Buma Village, Malaita Province
- Died: 2007 (aged 54–55)

John Garo (born 29 January 1952 in Buma Village, Malaita Province; died 2007) was a Solomon Islands politician.

He was elected to the National Parliament as MP for West Kwaio in the December 2001 general election. In May 2003, he was elected Leader of the Official Opposition. He was, at the time, an independent MP. Two months later, as Leader of the Opposition, he supported Prime Minister Allan Kemakeza's motion requesting that an Australian-led international peacekeeping force be deployed in Solomon Islands, in the wake of armed ethnic conflict on Guadalcanal. This led to the Regional Assistance Mission to Solomon Islands (RAMSI). In July 2004, he benefited from a Cabinet reshuffle, leaving the Opposition and joining the government as Minister of State assisting the Prime Minister.

He was not re-elected to Parliament in 2006, and died the following year.
