= Elijah Doro Muala =

Solomon Islands politician (1960–2021)

The Right Honourable Elijah Doro Muala MP

Minister for Commerce, Industries, Labour & Immigration
- In office 27 August 2010 – 8 September 2014
- Prime Minister: Danny Philip; Gordon Darcy Lilo

Member of Parliament for South Choiseul
- In office 4 August 2010 – April 2019
- Preceded by: Leslie Boseto
- Succeeded by: Robertson Galokale

Personal details
- Born: 20 January 1960 Sasamugga Village, Choiseul
- Died: 16 February 2021 (aged 61)
- Party: National Party

Elijah Doro Muala (20 January 1960 – 16 February 2021) was a Solomon Islands politician.

Following a secondary school education, he worked as an accountant.

His career in national politics began when he was elected to the Parliament of Solomon Islands as the member for South Choiseul in the August 2010 general election, standing for the National Party. He was then appointed Minister for Commerce, Industries, Labour & Immigration in Prime Minister Danny Philip's Cabinet. When Gordon Darcy Lilo replaced Philip as Prime Minister in November 2011, Muala retained his position in government. Muala was re-elected to the National Parliament of Solomon Islands for South Choiseul Constituency on 19 November 2014. However he lost reelection in the 3 April 2019 National General Election.
