= Ministry of Finance and Treasury (Solomon Islands) =

Agency overview
- Jurisdiction: Government of Solomon Islands
- Minister responsible: Rexon Annex Ramofafia, Minister of Finance and Treasury
- Agency executive: David Teika Dennis, Permanent Secretary of the Ministry of Finance and Treasury
- Website: https://solomons.gov.sb/ministry-of-finance-and-treasury/

The Ministry of Finance and Treasury is a government ministry of the Solomon Islands responsible for public finances. The ministry is located in Honiara.

== Organisation ==
The ministry consists of the following divisions:

- Corporate Services Support
- Customs and Excise
- Economics
- Funding and Finance
- Inland Revenue
- Internal Audit
- National Statistics Office
- Treasury

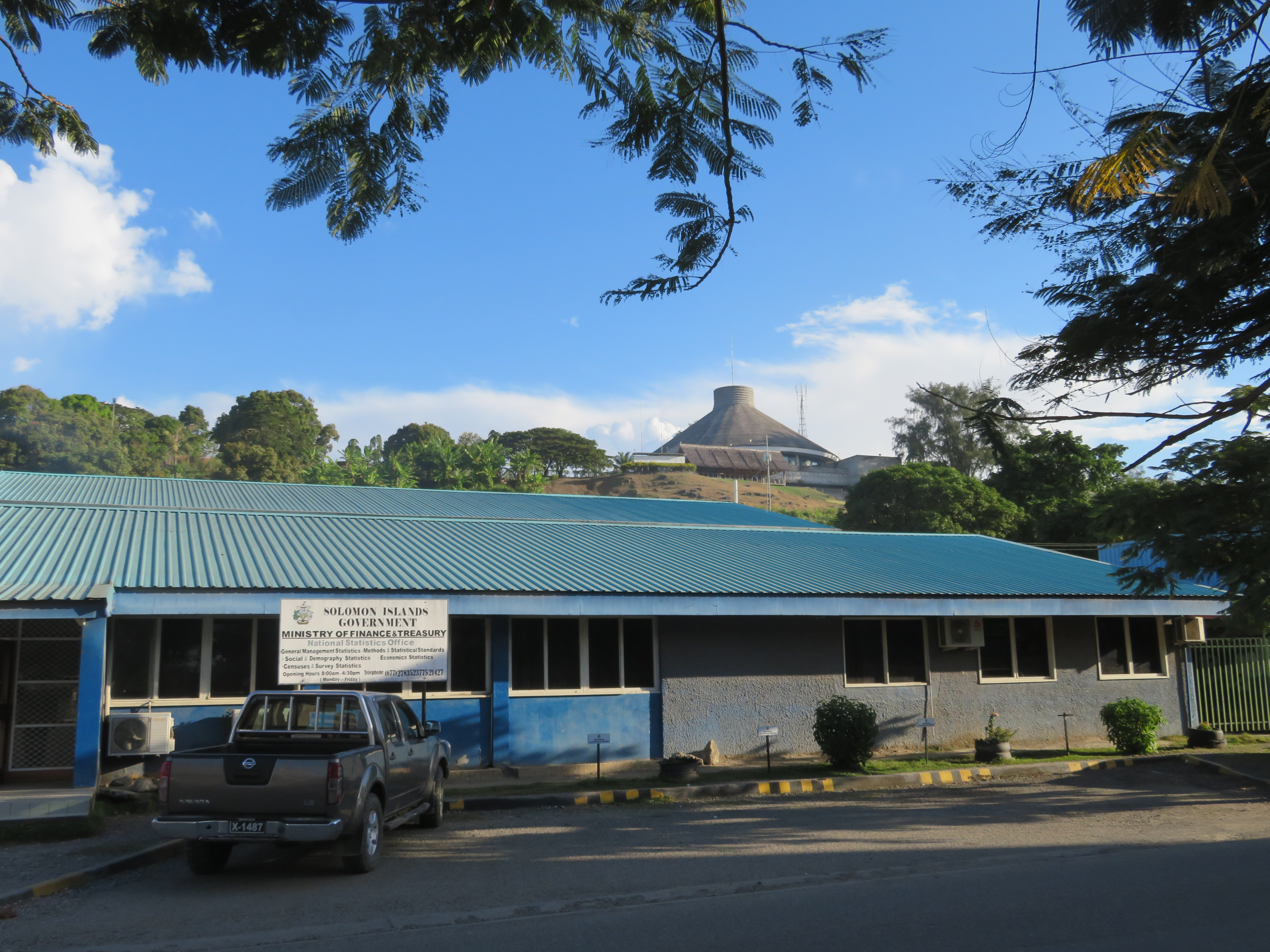
Headquarters of the ministry in Honiara

== Ministers ==
- Willie Betu, 1975-1976
- Benedict Kinika, 1976-1981
- Bartholomew Ulufa’alu, 1981-1984
- George Kejoa, 1985-1989
- Christopher Abe, 1989-1993
- Andrew Nori, 1993-1994
- Christopher Abe, 1994-1996
- Solomon Mamaloni, 1996
- Christopher Abe, 1996-1997
- Michael Maina, 1997
- Manasseh Sogavare, 1997-1998
- Bartholomew Ulufa’alu, 1998-1999
- Alpha Kimata, 1999-2000
- Snyder Rini, 2000-2001
- Michael Maina, 2001-2002
- Laurie Chan, 2002
- Snyder Rini, 2002-2003
- Francis Zama, 2003-2005
- Peter Boyers, 2005-2006
- Bartholomew Ulufa’alu, 2006
- Gordon Darcy Lilo, 2006-2007
- Francis Zama, 2007
- Snyder Rini, 2007-2010
- Francis Billy Hilly, 2010
- Gordon Darcy Lilo, 2010-2011
- Rick Hou, 2011-2014
- Snyder Rini, 2014-2017
- John Maneniaru, 2017
- Manasseh Sogavare, 2017-2019
- Harry Kuma, 2019-2024
- Manasseh Sogavare, 2024-2025
- Harry Kuma, 2025
- Trevor Manemahaga, 2025–2026
- Gordon Darcy Lilo, 2026–Present

== See also ==
- Cabinet of the Solomon Islands
- Economy of the Solomon Islands
