= John Maneniaru =

Solomon Islands politician (born 1965)

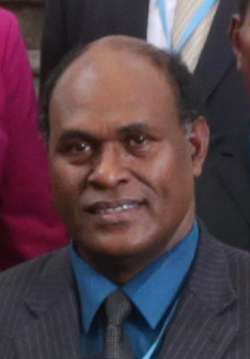
- John Maneniaru poses for an official photo as part of the delegation led by Solomon Islands Prime Minister Manasseh Sogavare (26 September 2017) in Taipei, Taiwan

Minister for Fisheries and Marine Resources
- In office 15 December 2014 – 13 October 2017

Minister of Finance of the Solomon Islands
- In office 13 October 2017 – 6 November 2017
- Preceded by: Snyder Rini
- Succeeded by: Manasseh Sogavare

Personal details
- Born: 20 June 1965 (age 60) Uhu village, Malaita Province
- Party: Kadere Party

John Maneniaru (born 20 June 1965) is a politician of Solomon Islands who served as Minister for Fisheries and Marine Resources, and very briefly Minister for Finance and Treasury. He served as Deputy Prime Minister under Prime Minister Sogavare until 30 September 2019 when he was terminated after abstaining in the vote to switch Solomon Islands' recognition from Taiwan to China.
