= Leader of the Independent Members =

The Leader of the Independent Members, also referred to as Leader of the Independent Group, is a Member of the National Parliament of Solomon Islands who is officially recognised as leader of a group of MPs who are aligned neither with the government nor with the Official Opposition.

The position is established by the Constitution of 1978, which has been in force since the country's independence from the United Kingdom. Article 66 of the Constitution creates the functions of Leader of the Opposition and Leader of the Independent Members, which are separate. (While "Leader of the Opposition" is a position found throughout the Commonwealth realms, "Leader of the Independent Members" is specific to Solomon Islands.) Both are officially appointed by the Governor-General, who appoints as Leader the Member of Parliament recognised as such by the Opposition, or by unaligned Members, respectively. The Governor-General may dismiss the Leader of the Independent Members if it appears he no longer enjoys the support of those members. The Leader of the Independent Members has no specific, constitutionally defined functions.

The following have served as Leader of the Independent Members:

- Daniel Enele Kwanairara from May 2006 to December 13, 2007, and Peter Shanel Agovaka from January 2008 to September 25, 2008. Both served during the Eighth Parliament, and neither was a member of any political party.
- Clay Forau became Leader of the Independent Members on August 30, 2010, following the 2010 general election. He was thus the first holder of that post in the Ninth Parliament. He is a member of the People's Federation Party. In early April 2011, however, he left the position to join the ranks of the government.
- Manasseh Maelanga, MP for East Malaita, was elected Leader of the Independent Members on 17 December 2014, following the 2014 general election.

== See also ==
- Prime Minister of Solomon Islands
- Leader of the Opposition (Solomon Islands)
