= Martin Magga =

Solomon Islands politician (1953–2014)

Martin Magga (November 11, 1953 – August 25, 2014) was a member of the National Parliament of the Solomon Islands, representing the Temotu Pele constituency. He served as the Solomon Islands' Minister of Lands, Housing and Survey in Prime Minister Derek Sikua's Cabinet until May 2009, when he was transferred to the position of Minister for Health and Medical Services.

As Minister for Health, he announced that the government was implementing "a Sector Wide Approach (SWA) for the health sector": "The Sector Wide Approach brings together Government, donors and implementing partners under the leadership of Ministry of Health and Medical Services [...] in a more harmonised, integrated and coordinated effort to support the National Health Strategic Plan." The "main objectives" of this approach were "to raise quality and accessibility of health services and improve financial sustainability and the management of the health system".

Magga had also served as Minister for Justice in 2007, and was Acting Minister for Agriculture and Livestock for a time in 2008.

In May 2009, mere days after his appointment as Health Minister, and while returning from the World Health Assembly in Geneva, Magga "suddenly developed medical problems". He was hospitalised in Australia. The media reported that he had undergone "urgent surgery" and that he was in "critical condition".

In June, he was "relieved of his ministerial duties on medical grounds" and replaced by Clay Forau Soalaoi. The Solomon Star reported Australian doctors as saying that Magga would "not be able to function as he previously did, either as minister or as member of parliament", due to "a series of complications during and after surgery". He remained on life support but reportedly showed "slight improvement".

He was, nonetheless, successfully returned to Parliament in the August 2010 general election, though he was not given a Cabinet position. He used a wheelchair from then on. In April 2012, it was reported that constituents had visited him twice to ask him to resign due to his health. He died two years later, while still serving as an MP.
