= David Pacha =

Solomon Islands politician (born 1964)

David Day Pacha (born December 25, 1964) is a member of the National Parliament of the Solomon Islands. He represents the South Guadalcanal constituency in Guadalcanal Province. He originates from Peochakuri village on Guadalcanal. In May 2009, he was named Minister of Mines, Energy and Rural Electrification in Prime Minister Derek Sikua's government. Since August 2017 he has been the Deputy Speaker of Parliament.

Prior to entering Parliament, he graduated from Tary Bible School and served as National Director of the Solomon Islands branch of the Bible Society of the South Pacific.

He was first elected to Parliament on April 5, 2006, representing the South Guadalcanal constituency. He served as Minister for Communication, Aviation and Meteorology from April to May 2006, then as Minister for Provincial Government and Institutional Strengthening from December 2007 to May 2009, before being appointed Minister of Mines, Energy and Rural Electrification.
