= Trevor Olavae =

Solomon Islands politician (born 1959)

Trevor Olavae (born April 6, 1959) is a member of the National Parliament of the Solomon Islands. He lives in the area of Vella Lavella.

== See also ==
- Politics of Solomon Islands
