= Varian Lonamei =

Solomon Islands politician (born 1962)

Varian Lonamei (born May 10, 1962) is a member of the National Parliament of Solomon Islands. He represents a constituency from Isabel Province, and currently serves as the Minister for Aviation, Communication and Meteorology for the Solomon Islands. He received a degree in commerce from Papua New Guinea University of Technology.
