= National Coalition for Reform and Advancement =

The National Coalition for Reform and Advancement (NCRA) was a political coalition in the Solomon Islands, consisting of seven political parties and entities: the Direct Development Party (DDP), the Independent Democratic Party (IDP), the OUR Party, the Reform Democratic Party, the Rural and Urban Political Party (RUP), the Solomon Islands Party for Rural Advancement (SIPRA), and several independent members of parliament. The leader of the coalition is Danny Philip of the Reform Democratic Party.

Following the 2010 general election, the NCRA was in power in the Solomon Islands by a small majority, with NCRA members holding 27 seats in the country's 50 seat parliament.
