= Prime Minister of Solomon Islands =

Head of government

- Praem Minista blo Solomon Aelan (Pijin)
- Coat of Arms of Solomon Islands

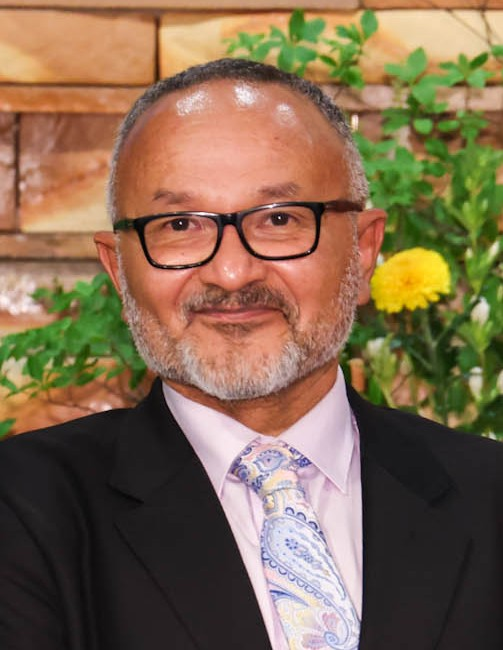
- Incumbent; Matthew Wale since 15 May 2026
- Residence: Red House, Honiara
- Appointer: Elected by the members of Parliament
- Term length: Until next election
- Constituting instrument: Constitution of Solomon Islands
- Formation: 7 July 1978
- First holder: Peter Kenilorea
- Salary: SI$143,000 / US$17,439 annually

The prime minister of Solomon Islands is Solomon Islands' head of government, as elected by the National Parliament. Matthew Wale has served as the Prime Minister of the Solomon Islands since May 2026.

Solomon Islands is a Commonwealth realm; the functions of the head of state are performed on behalf of the monarch of Solomon Islands by the governor-general of Solomon Islands, who is nominated by Parliament.

The prime minister's official residence is Red House in Honiara.

== Constitutional basis ==
Section 33 of the constitution of Solomon Islands provides for the prime minister to be elected by the members of the national parliament. The other government ministers are appointed by the governor-general on the advice of the prime minister.

The prime minister may be removed from office by the governor-general following a no-confidence motion passed by an absolute majority of the national parliament. The office is also vacated if the prime minister resigns, ceases to be a member of parliament, or is elected as speaker or deputy speaker. In the event of a vacancy, the governor-general, in consultation with cabinet, appoints one of the existing government ministers to act as prime minister until the national parliament can meet to fill the vacancy.

Schedule 2 to the constitution outlines the process for election of the prime minister. All members of parliament are eligible for nomination, but must be nominated by at least four other members. The election is then held by secret ballot with the governor-general presiding. If a candidate fails to secure a majority of votes on the first ballot, an exhaustive ballot takes place with the candidate with the lowest number of votes eliminated on each ballot.

== List of officeholders ==
Political parties

Solomon Islands United Party (UP)
People's Alliance Party (PAP)
Independent
Group for National Unity and Reconciliation (GNUR)
Solomon Islands Liberal Party (SILP)
People's Progressive Party (PPP)
Association of Independent Members (AIM)
Solomon Islands Social Credit Party (Socreds)
Reform Democratic Party (RDPSI)
Solomon Islands Party for Rural Advancement (SIPRA)
Democratic Alliance Party (DAP)
Ownership, Unity and Responsibility Party (OUR Party)
Solomon Islands Democratic Party (SIDP)

No.	Portrait	Name (Birth–Death)	Term of office			Political party	Elected	Cabinet(s)	Ref.
No.	Portrait	Name (Birth–Death)	Took office	Left office	Time in office	Political party	Elected	Cabinet(s)	Ref.
1		Peter Kenilorea (1943–2016)	7 July 1978	31 August 1981	3 years, 55 days	United Party	–	Kenilorea I	
1		Peter Kenilorea (1943–2016)	7 July 1978	31 August 1981	3 years, 55 days	United Party	1980	Kenilorea I	
2		Solomon Mamaloni (1943–2000)	31 August 1981	19 November 1984	3 years, 80 days	People's Alliance Party	—	Mamaloni I	
(1)		Sir Peter Kenilorea (1943–2016)	19 November 1984	1 December 1986	2 years, 12 days	United Party	1984	Kenilorea II	
3		Ezekiel Alebua (1947–2022)	1 December 1986	28 March 1989	2 years, 117 days	United Party	—	Alebua	
(2)		Solomon Mamaloni (1943–2000)	28 March 1989	18 June 1993	4 years, 82 days	People's Alliance Party (GNUR)	1989	Mamaloni II	
4		Sir Francis Billy Hilly (1948–2025)	18 June 1993	7 November 1994	1 year, 142 days	Independent (NCP)	1993	Hilly	
(2)		Solomon Mamaloni (1943–2000)	7 November 1994	27 August 1997	2 years, 293 days	National Unity and Reconciliation	—	Mamaloni III	
5		Bartholomew Ulufa'alu (1950–2007)	27 August 1997	30 June 2000	2 years, 308 days	Liberal Party (SIAC)	1997	Ulufa'alu	
6		Manasseh Sogavare (born 1955)	30 June 2000	17 December 2001	1 year, 170 days	People's Progressive Party	—	Sogavare I	
7		Allan Kemakeza (born 1950)	17 December 2001	20 April 2006	4 years, 124 days	People's Progressive Party	2001	Kemakeza	
8		Snyder Rini (1948–2025)	20 April 2006	4 May 2006	14 days	Association of Independent Members	2006	Rini	
(6)		Manasseh Sogavare (born 1955)	4 May 2006	20 December 2007	1 year, 230 days	Social Credit Party	—	Sogavare II	
9		Derek Sikua (born 1959)	20 December 2007	25 August 2010	2 years, 248 days	Liberal Party	—	Sikua	
10		Danny Philip (born 1953)	25 August 2010	16 November 2011	1 year, 83 days	Reform Democratic	2010	Philip	
11		Gordon Darcy Lilo (born 1965)	16 November 2011	9 December 2014	3 years, 23 days	Party for Rural Advancement	—	Lilo	
(6)		Manasseh Sogavare (born 1955)	9 December 2014	15 November 2017	2 years, 341 days	Independent	2014	Sogavare III	
12		Rick Houenipwela (born 1958)	15 November 2017	24 April 2019	1 year, 160 days	Democratic Alliance	—	Houenipwela	
(6)		Manasseh Sogavare (born 1955)	24 April 2019	2 May 2024	5 years, 8 days	Ownership, Unity and Responsibility	2019	Sogavare IV	
13		Jeremiah Manele (born 1968)	2 May 2024	15 May 2026	2 years, 13 days	Ownership, Unity and Responsibility	2024	Manele	
14		Matthew Wale (born 1968)	15 May 2026	Incumbent	154 days	Democratic Party	—	Wale	

== See also ==
- Deputy Prime Minister of Solomon Islands
- Governor-General of Solomon Islands
- Leader of the Opposition (Solomon Islands)
- Leader of the Independent Members
- High Commissioner for the Western Pacific
- Governing Council of the Solomon Islands
