= Reform Democratic Party =

- Leader: Danny Philip

The Reform Democratic Party of Solomon Islands (RDPSI) was a political party in Solomon Islands founded by MP Danny Philip.

Campaigning for the 2010 general election, the party promised constitutional reform in order for the people to be "true owners of the state and its institutions". The party won three seats in the election, and Philip was elected Prime Minister in August 2010. Philip would go on to resign a year later and would later lead the United Democratic Party.
