= Deputy Prime Minister of Solomon Islands =

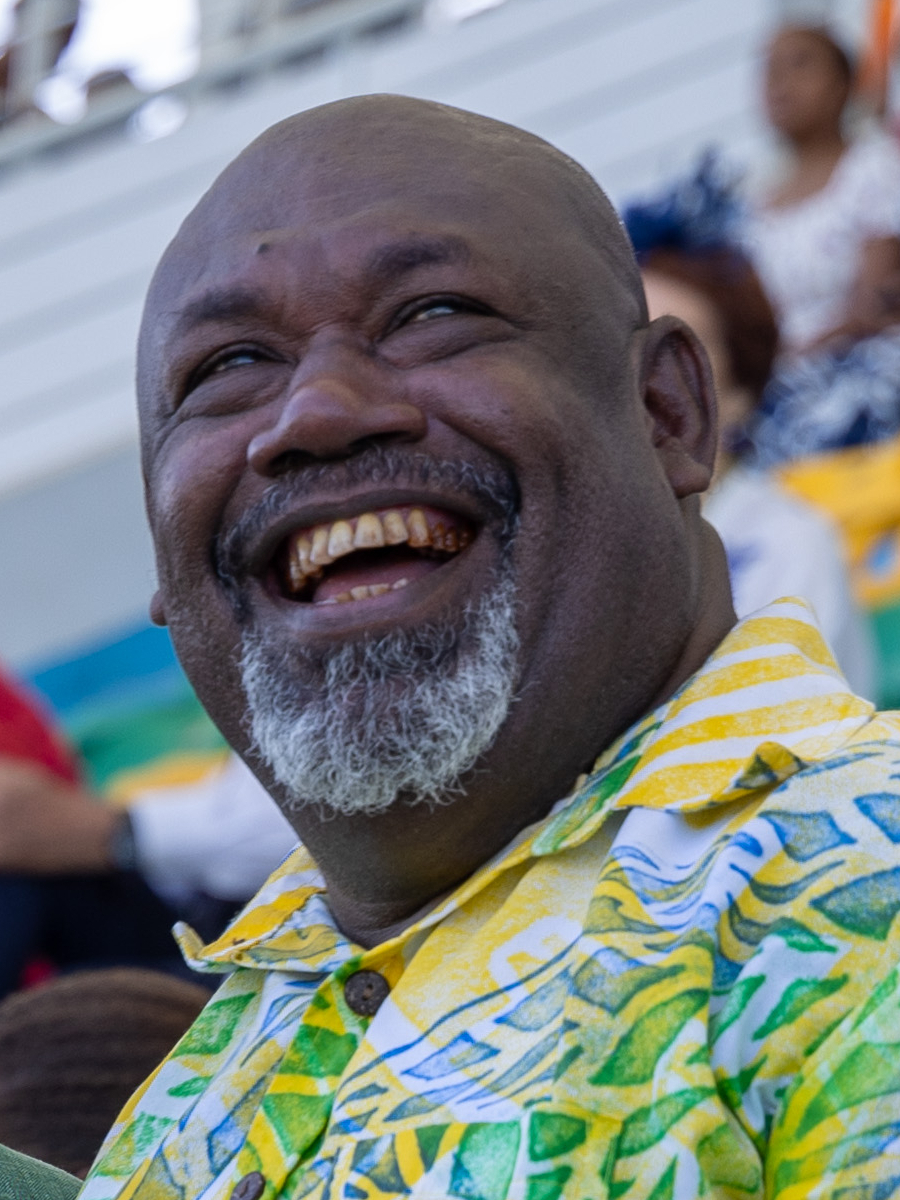
- Incumbent; Francis Sade since 16 May 2026
- Appointer: Governor-General of Solomon Islands

The deputy prime minister of Solomon Islands is the Solomon Islands' secondary Head of Government appointed by the prime minister of Solomon Islands.

Since the 16 May 2026, the deputy prime minister has been Francis Sade MP.

== See also ==
- Prime Minister of Solomon Islands
- National Parliament of Solomon Islands
