= Snyder Rini =

8th Prime Minister of Solomon Islands (1948–2025)

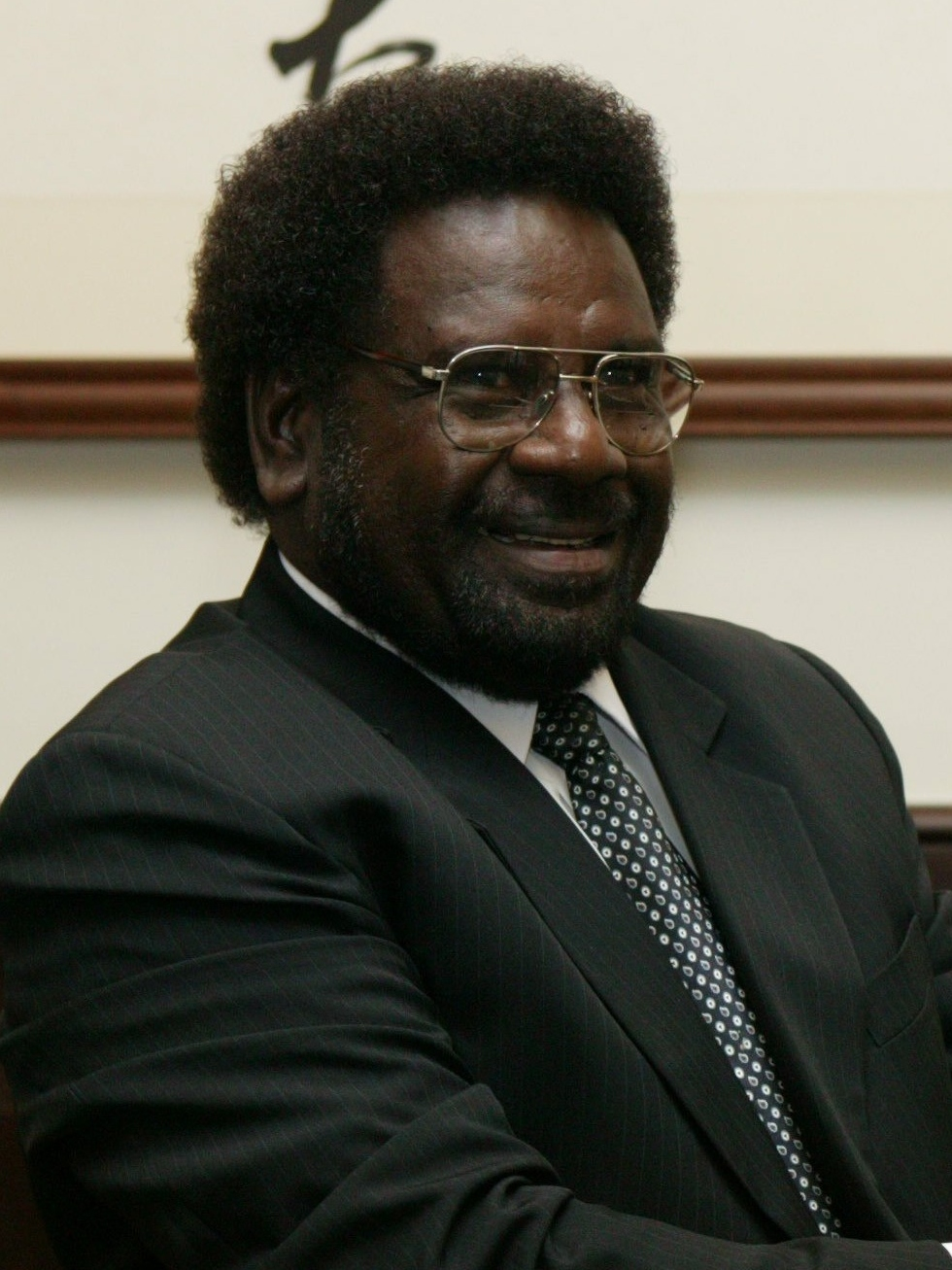
- Rini in 2004

Prime Minister of Solomon Islands
- In office 20 April 2006 – 4 May 2006
- Monarch: Elizabeth II
- Governor-General: Nathaniel Waena
- Preceded by: Allan Kemakeza
- Succeeded by: Manasseh Sogavare

Personal details
- Born: 27 July 1948 Telina, British Solomon Islands (now in Western Province, Solomon Islands)
- Died: 5 August 2025 (aged 77) Honiara, Solomon Islands
- Party: Association of Independent Members

Snyder Rini (27 July 1948 – 5 August 2025) was a Solomon Islands politician who was briefly the prime minister of Solomon Islands from April to May 2006 and was Minister for Finance and Treasury 2000–2001, 2002–2003, 2007–2010 and 2014–2017. He represented the Marovo constituency in the National Parliament from 1997 until his death.

== Early life and education ==
Rini was born in Telina village in Marovo Lagoon of Western District, British Solomon Islands on 27 July 1948. He attended Kukudu Primary School and the Seventh Day Adventist’s Betikama Secondary School before going to Papua New Guinea in 1970 to study at the Kambubu High School. He graduated with degrees in accounting from the University of Papua New Guinea in 1971 and the University of Technology in Lae in 1974.

== Politics ==
Rini was Permanent Secretary for the Ministry for Natural Resources in 1989 and was Chairman of Solomon Islands National Provident Fund from 1990 to 1996. He was also Permanent Secretary for the Ministry of National Planning and Development from 1994 to 1995 and Permanent Secretary for the Ministry of Agriculture and Fisheries from January 1997 to June 1997. He was first elected to the National Parliament in the August 1997 election. Under Prime Minister Manasseh Sogavare, he served as Minister of Finance and Treasury from July 2000 to December 2001. Re-elected to Parliament in December 2001, he became deputy prime minister and Minister for National Planning & Development in that month; after one year, he became deputy prime minister and Minister for Finance and Treasury in December 2002, and he then became deputy prime minister and Minister for Education and Human Resources Development in mid-2003, remaining in that post until April 2006.

Rini was re-elected to his seat in the April 2006 parliamentary election. Rini's subsequent election as prime minister by Parliament on 18 April 2006 caused riots as some claimed the election had been fixed, that Rini was linked to alleged corruption in the previous government and that Rini's government would be unduly influenced by local Chinese businessmen and one or both of the mainland China and Republic of China (Taiwan) governments. Originally to be sworn in as prime minister on 19 April, this was delayed until the following day because of the riots and conducted without prior notice so as to avoid triggering further violence. In response to the violence, extra Australian, New Zealand and Fijian police and defence personnel were dispatched as part of the Regional Assistance Mission to Solomon Islands to try to enable his new government to regain control.

On 26 April, Rini resigned immediately before facing a motion of no confidence in Parliament. The news of his resignation caused celebrations in the streets of Honiara. His successor, Manasseh Sogavare, took office on 4 May 2006, defeating Rini's deputy prime minister, Fred Fono, in the vote to replace Rini.

Fono, as Leader of the Opposition, named Rini as Shadow Minister of National Planning and Aid Coordination on 16 May 2006. After Sogavare was defeated in a no-confidence vote in December 2007, Rini became Minister for Finance and Treasury under Prime Minister Derek Sikua on 21 December 2007.

Following the replacement of Manasseh Sogavare as prime minister by Rick Houenipwela on 15 November 2017, Sogavare became Minister of Finance of the Solomon Islands.

== Death ==
Rini died in Honiara on 5 August 2025, at the age of 77.

== Sources ==
- Election as PM
- Riots in response

Political offices
Preceded by Allan Kemakeza	Prime Minister of Solomon Islands; 18 April 2006 – 4 May 2006	Succeeded by Manasseh Sogavare
