= Manasseh Sogavare =

Former Prime Minister of Solomon Islands

The Honourable Manasseh Sogavare
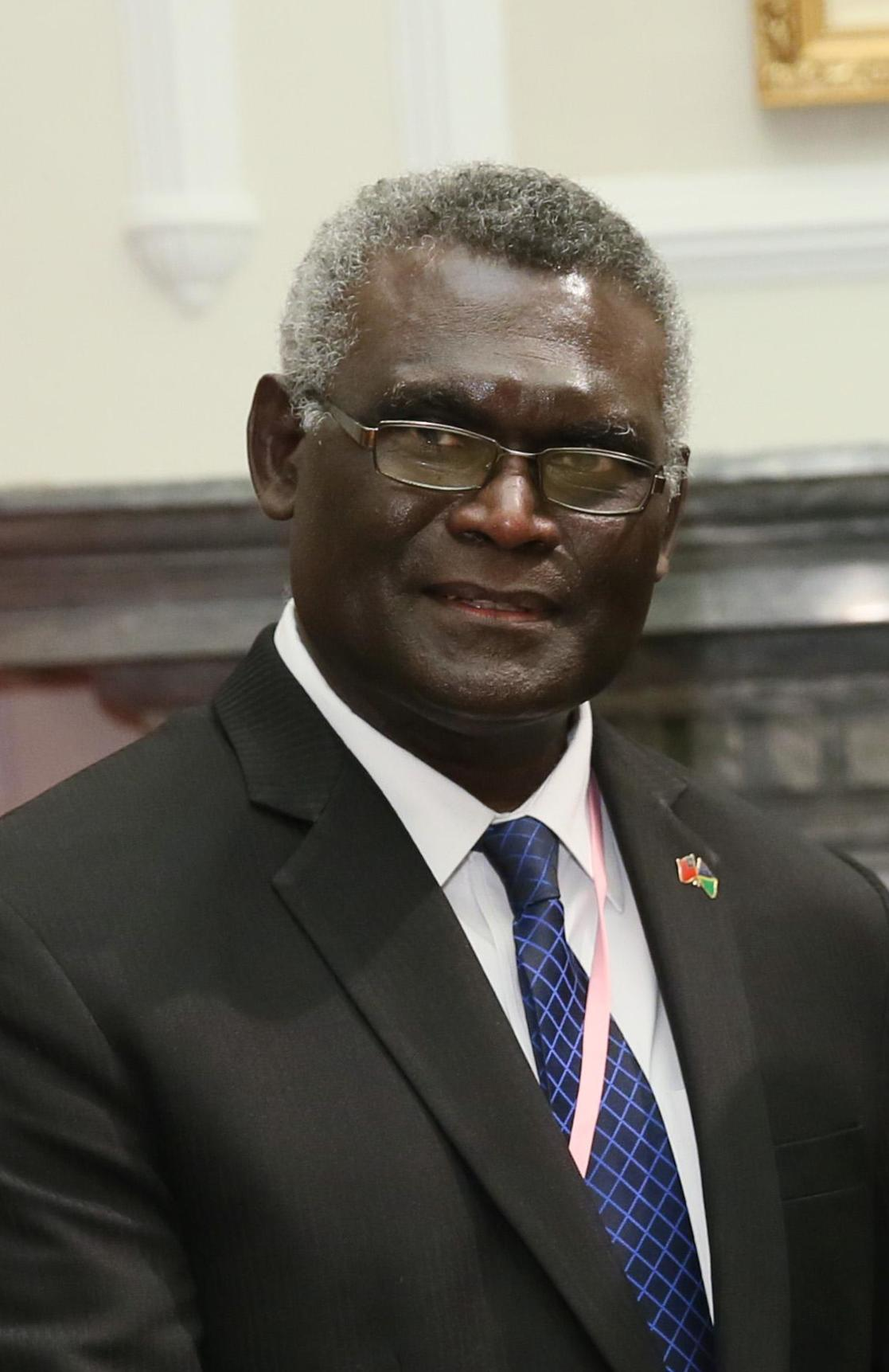
- Sogavare in 2016

Minister of Finance
- In office 6 May 2024 – 28 April 2025
- Prime Minister: Jeremiah Manele
- Preceded by: Harry Kuma
- Succeeded by: Harry Kuma
- In office 16 November 2017 – 15 November 2019
- Prime Minister: Rick Houenipwela; Himself
- Preceded by: John Maneniaru
- Succeeded by: Harry Kuma
- In office 24 August 1997 – July 1998
- Prime Minister: Bartholomew Ulufa'alu
- Preceded by: Michael Maina
- Succeeded by: Bartholomew Ulufa'alu

Prime Minister of Solomon Islands
- In office 24 April 2019 – 2 May 2024
- Monarchs: Elizabeth II; Charles III
- Governors-General: Sir Frank Kabui; Sir David Vunagi
- Deputy: Manasseh Maelanga
- Preceded by: Rick Houenipwela
- Succeeded by: Jeremiah Manele
- In office 9 December 2014 – 15 November 2017
- Monarch: Elizabeth II
- Governor-General: Sir Frank Kabui
- Preceded by: Gordon Darcy Lilo
- Succeeded by: Rick Houenipwela
- In office 4 May 2006 – 20 December 2007
- Monarch: Elizabeth II
- Governor-General: Sir Nathaniel Waena
- Preceded by: Snyder Rini
- Succeeded by: Derek Sikua
- In office 30 June 2000 – 17 December 2001
- Monarch: Elizabeth II
- Governor-General: Sir John Lapli
- Preceded by: Bartholomew Ulufa'alu
- Succeeded by: Allan Kemakeza

Member of Parliament; for East Choiseul
- Incumbent
- Assumed office 6 August 1997
- Preceded by: Allan Qurusu

Personal details
- Born: Manasseh Damukana Sogavare; 17 January 1955 (age 71) Popondetta, Northern Province, Territory of Papua and New Guinea
- Party: OUR Party (2010; since 2019)
- Other political affiliations: People's Progressive Party (2001–2005); Solomon Islands Social Credit Party (2005–2009); Independent (2014–2019)
- Spouse: Emmy Sogavare
- Manasseh Sogavare's voice Recorded 10 July 2023

Manasseh Damukana Sogavare (born 17 January 1955) is a Solomon Islander politician who served as prime minister of Solomon Islands for a total of nine years from 2000 to 2001, 2006–2007, 2014–2017, and 2019–2024. Sogavare has served in the National Parliament representing East Choiseul since 1997. He also served as minister of finance from 1997 to 1998, 2017–2019, and 2024–2025.

Sogavare has been widely accused of promoting democratic backsliding in Solomon Islands. The Solomon Islands under Sogavare has been criticised by many as being increasingly autocratic or even authoritarian. Despite earning a modest formal salary, he has accrued a vast real estate portfolio, raising questions about his sources of income.

== Early life ==
Sogavare was born in Popondetta, Northern Province, in the Territory of Papua, then part of the Australian-ruled Territory of Papua and New Guinea, on 17 January 1955 to missionary parents from Choiseul Island, Solomon Islands. He has four older brothers: Moses, Samson, John, and Jacob. Later in life, Manasseh and his older brother Jacob moved to the Solomon Islands.

== Education Background ==
He graduated with a bachelor's degree in accounting and Economics from the University of the South Pacific (USP) and a master's degree in management studies from the University of Waikato in New Zealand.

== Political career ==
=== Early career ===
Sogavare was the Permanent Secretary of the Ministry of Finance from February 1994 to October 1996. Prior to his election to Parliament, he served as the Commissioner of Inland Revenue, Director of the Central Bank of the Solomon Islands, and Chairman of the Solomon Islands National Provident Fund. He was first elected to the National Parliament from the East Choiseul constituency in the 6 August 1997 election.

Under Prime Minister Bartholomew Ulufa'alu, Sogavare became Minister of Finance and Treasury in 1997 but was dismissed from that post by Ulufa'alu in mid-July 1998. Sogavare said that he was shocked at the dismissal, as he could see no reason for it and no reason was given, and he demanded an explanation. A few days later, Ulufa'alu said that the decision was motivated by the need for the government to maintain the numbers to stay in power. In early August 1998, Sogavare withdrew his support for Ulufa'alu and his government, accusing Ulufa'alu of authoritarian and hypocritical leadership and of emphasizing stability only to protect himself.

Sogavare was chosen as the deputy leader of the opposition in late September 1998, with Solomon Mamaloni as the leader. Following Mamaloni's death in January 2000, Sogavare was elected as the leader of the opposition later that month. He received the votes of all ten members of the opposition who were present.

=== Prime minister (2000–2001) ===
Sogavare was elected as prime minister by parliament on 30 June 2000, with 23 votes in favor and 21 against, after Ulufa'alu was captured by rebels and forced to resign. He served as prime minister until 17 December 2001.

=== Out of office (2001–2006) ===
His party won only three seats in the 2001 general election, but Sogavare was re-elected to his seat in Parliament.

In Parliament, Sogavare was a member of the Bills and Legislation Committee in 2002 and again from 2005 to April 2006.

Following the 2006 general election, Sogavare led the Solomon Islands Social Credit Party into a coalition to oust Prime Minister Allan Kemakeza's chosen successor Snyder Rini, but there was much disagreement about who should be its candidate for Prime Minister. On 18 April 2006, he received 11 of 50 votes to become prime minister, placing him third. He then switched his support to Rini, allowing Rini to become prime minister while Sogavare became part of the coalition and was named Minister for Commerce, Industries and Employment.

=== Prime minister (second term, 2006–2007) ===
Following Rini's resignation on 26 April 2006, Sogavare decided to attempt again to become prime minister. This time the opponents of Kemakeza and Rini united behind him, and in parliamentary vote on 4 May 2006, he received 28 votes, defeating the government candidate Fred Fono, who received 22 votes. Sogavare was immediately sworn in. His main tasks included organizing the recovery from rioting that took place during Rini's time as prime minister.

On 11 October 2006, Sogavare survived a no-confidence vote in parliament; the motion, introduced by Fono, was supported by 17 members of parliament, while 28 voted against it. The no-confidence vote was prompted by deteriorating relations with Australia. Sogavare had expelled the Australian High Commissioner Patrick Cole in September and defended the Solomons' suspended attorney general, Julian Moti, who Australia wanted extradited to face child sex charges there. Moti presently faces charges in the Solomons for illegally entering the country. On 13 October, Sogavare threatened to expel Australia from an assistance mission in the Solomons, and a week later Australian peacekeepers from the Regional Assistance Mission to Solomon Islands raided Sogavare's office (when he was not present) looking for evidence related to the Moti case.

On 13 December 2007, Sogavare was defeated in a parliamentary vote of no confidence; the motion against him received 25 votes, with 22 in opposition. He remained in office in a caretaker capacity until the election of a new Prime Minister on 20 December, when opposition candidate Derek Sikua was elected, defeating Patteson Oti who had been Foreign Minister under Sogavare. On the same date, Sogavare became Leader of the Opposition.

=== Leader of the Opposition (2007–2014) ===
In 2010, Sogavare and eight other MPs established the Ownership, Unity and Responsibility Party, which won three seats in the 2010 general election.

=== Prime minister (third term, 2014–2017) ===
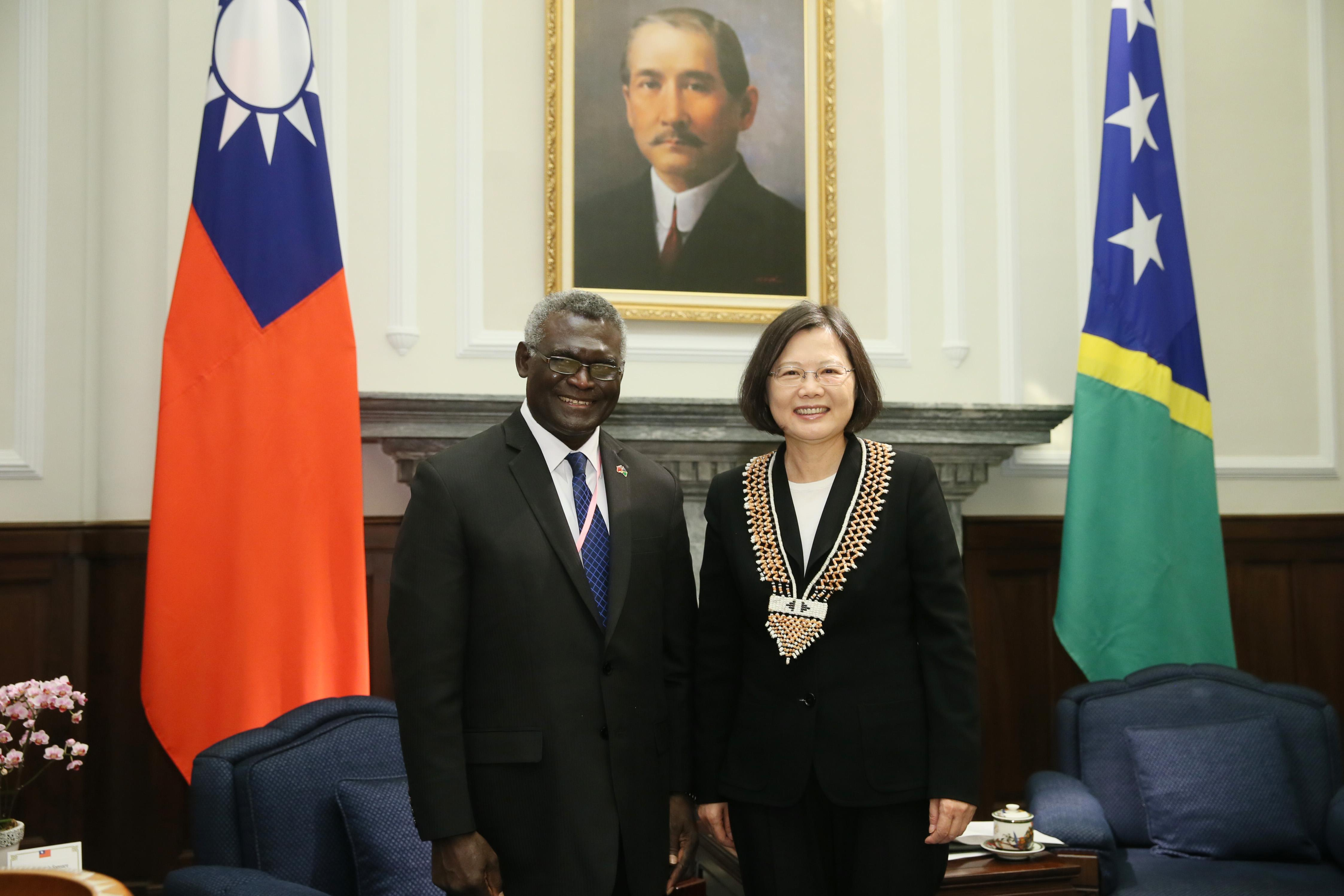
Sogavare meets with Taiwanese President Tsai Ing-wen in July 2016

Following the 19 November 2014 general election, Sogavere became prime minister for the third time. On 22 September 2017 Sogavare spoke at the United Nations General Assembly. He condemned North Korea for their testing of ballistic missiles. He also condemned Indonesia for violence in West Papua. On 7 November 2017, seventeen members of his Democratic Coalition for Change voted against him in another motion of no-confidence. The lawmaker who submitted the motion of no confidence, Derek Sikua, claimed that Sogavere had lost touch with reality and become fixated on conspiracy theories, while Sogavere attributed the defections to a proposed anti-graft bill, saying that some MPs were afraid it would lead to them being imprisoned. Sogavere remained as Acting Prime Minister until Rick Houenipwela was elected on 15 November 2017. Sogavare then became finance minister and deputy prime minister.

=== Prime minister (fourth term, 2019–2024) ===
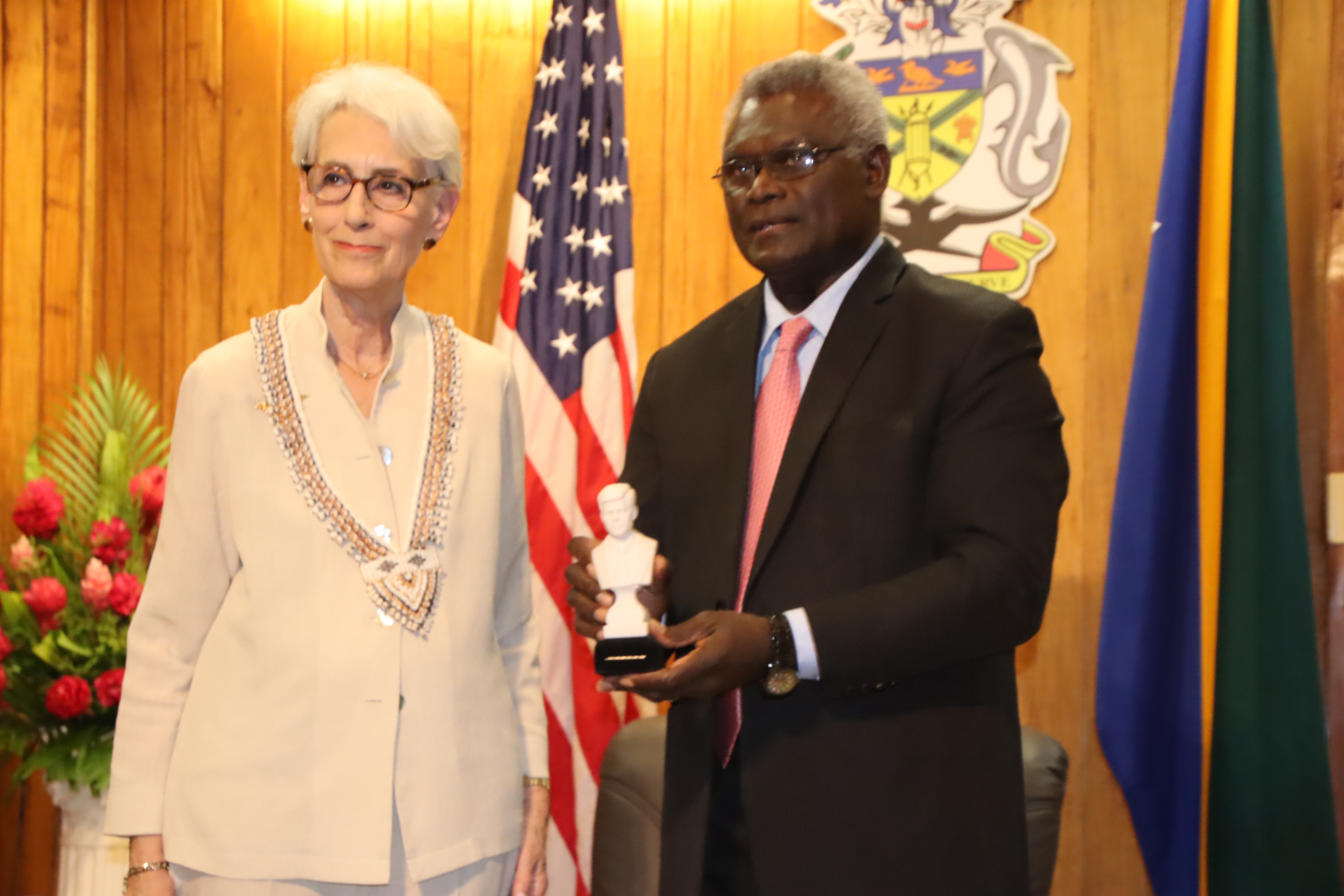
Sogavare with US Deputy Secretary of State Wendy Sherman in 2022

Shortly after the 2019 general election, Sogavare relaunched the Ownership, Unity and Responsibility Party (OUR). On 24 April 2019, he was once again elected Prime Minister with more than half the vote. There is controversy surrounding the election since a court issued an injunction to postpone the vote. The Governor General, Frank Kabui, chose to proceed with the election because, under the constitution of the Solomon Islands, the Governor-general has immunity from the courts when conducting the election of the prime minister. After Sogavare was re-elected there was rioting in Honiara forcing shops and offices to close. Additionally, rioters did damage to the Pacific Casino Hotel which was used by Sogavare as his campaign headquarters.

On 16 September 2019, Sogavare's government recognised the People's Republic of China (PRC), switching recognition from the Republic of China after 36 years. In a statement Sogavare announced the decision as representing an advance of Solomon Islands national interests, an outcome of a bi-partisan taskforce to investigate and confirm the facts surrounding the 'One China Principle', and reporting by the Ministry of Foreign Affairs and External Trade. Responding to questions about caucus unity on the decision, Sogavare presented it as "a collective agreement agreed to by all the Democratic Coalition Government for Advancement (DCGA) coalition MPs elected into the 11th parliament, conducted in a very open and transparent manner as far as government caucus is concerned". The decision caused significant political and public debate in Solomon Islands. In the wake of the decision, planning minister Rick Hou and justice minister, Tautai Kaitu'u were sacked. Hou claimed Sogavare lied about the process for recognising the PRC, claiming the decision was pre-determined. Deputy Prime Minister John Maneniaru and Education Minister Dean Kuku were terminated, with Police Minister Lanelle Tanagada opting to resign.

Malaita Province, however, continued to be supported by Taiwan and the United States, the latter sending US$25 million of aid to the island in 2020. The premier of Malaita Province, Daniel Suidani, also held an independence referendum in 2020 which the national government has dismissed as illegitimate.

Riots broke out in November 2021 during which anti-government protesters, most of them from Malaita Province, burnt down buildings adjoining the Solomon Islands Parliament Building, while also looting Honiara's Chinatown. Sogavare himself resisted calls to resign, warning that the rioters would "face consequences" while also accusing them of being "politically motivated".

Australia responded to the unrest by deploying Australian Federal Police and Australian Defence Force personnel following a request from the Sogavare government under the Australia–Solomon Islands Bilateral Security Treaty. Papua New Guinea and Fiji also sent peacekeepers.

On 6 December 2021, he survived a motion of no confidence in the National Parliament.

In 2022, Sogavare entered the Solomon Islands into a wide-ranging security pact with China.

While the 2024 general elections were initially planned for 2023, parliament voted in 2022 to delay the elections with Sogavare claiming that the country could not afford to have an election in the same year it was hosting the Pacific Games. The opposition condemned the delay and accused Sogavare of a power grab. Ultimately, Sogavare led OUR party to win a leading fifteen seats and over 24% of the vote in the elections. On 29 April, Sogavare announced he would step down as OUR Party leader and not seek another term as prime minister in the 2 May parliamentary vote, which he said was a "collective decision". OUR Party's bloc, the Coalition of National Unity and Transformation, which also included the Kadere and People First parties, nominated Foreign Minister Jeremiah Manele for prime minister, who succeeded Sogavare as OUR Party leader. Manele became prime minister on 2 May, after defeating Matthew Wale in a parliamentary vote. Sogavare was subsequently appointed finance minister.

=== Later politics ===
On 28 April 2025, Sogavare resigned as finance minister, and joined an opposition coalition seeking to unseat Manele. Also in this group were Wale, Peter Kenilorea Jr., and Gordon Darcy Lilo. Manele managed to secure enough support to avoid a motion of no confidence. Following this, Sogavare became a backbencher (neither in government or leading the opposition) for the first time since 1997.

On 18 March 2026, Sogavare was appointed as deputy prime minister. After Manele's government was ousted by a no confidence vote, Sogavare was appointed as leader of the opposition on 20 May 2026.

== Personal life ==
Sogavare is married to Emmy Sogavare, and has three children: Brandt, Shannon and Maydrel. Emmy Sogavare owns a café, known as Shadel Café.

As PM, Sogavare earns a salary of 428,560 Solomon Islands dollars (around US$50,000).

Sogavare has a black belt in karate.

=== Religion ===
Sogavare is a member of the Seventh-day Adventist Church. He dedicated the Sogavare Memorial Seventh-day Adventist Church in memory of his father Sagavare Loko.

Assembly seats
Preceded by Allan Qurusu	Member of Parliament for East Choiseul; 1997–present	Incumbent
Political offices
Preceded by Michael Maina	Minister of Finance; 1997–1998	Succeeded by Bartholomew Ulufa'alu
Preceded by Bartholomew Ulufa'alu	Prime Minister of Solomon Islands; 2000–2001	Succeeded by Allan Kemakeza
Preceded by Snyder Rini	Prime Minister of Solomon Islands; 2006–2007	Succeeded by Derek Sikua
Preceded by Gordon Darcy Lilo	Prime Minister of Solomon Islands; 2014–2017	Succeeded by Rick Houenipwela
Preceded by John Maneniaru	Minister of Finance; 2017–2019	Succeeded by Harry Kuma
Preceded by Rick Houenipwela	Prime Minister of Solomon Islands; 2019–2024	Succeeded by Jeremiah Manele
Preceded by Harry Kuma	Minister of Finance; 2024–present	Incumbent
Party political offices
Party re-established	Leader of the Ownership, Unity and Responsibility Party; 2019–2024	Succeeded by Jeremiah Manele
