= Gordon Darcy Lilo =

Prime Minister of Solomon Islands (2011–2014)

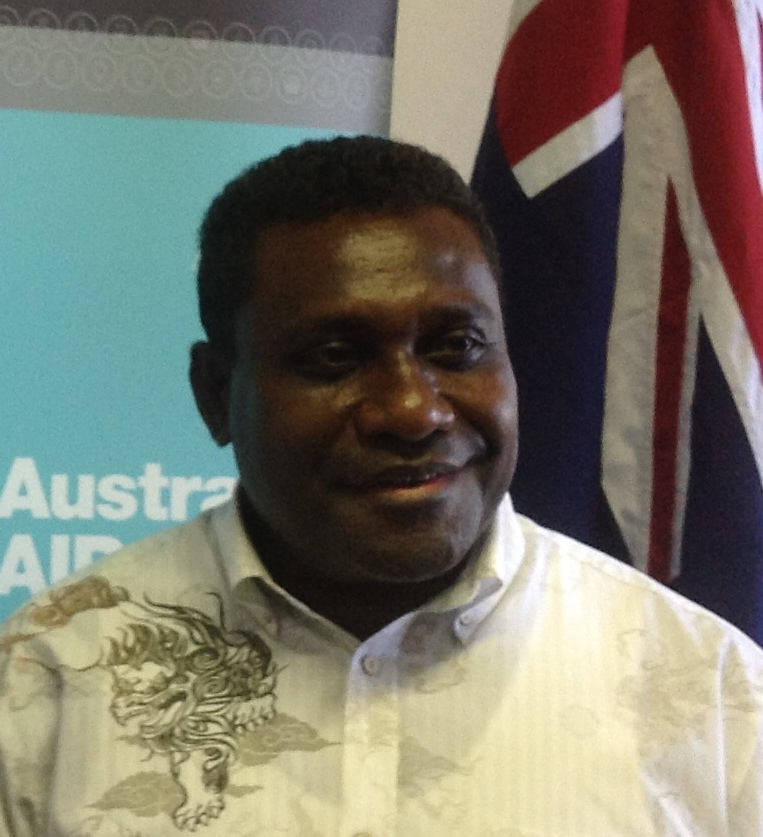

Minister for Finance and Treasury
- In office 17 May 2026 – 1 September 2026
- Prime Minister: Matthew Wale
- Preceded by: Trevor Manemahaga
- Succeeded by: Rexon Ramofafia
- In office 2010–2011
- Prime Minister: Danny Philip
- Preceded by: Francis Billy Hilly
- Succeeded by: Rick Houenipwela
- In office 2006–2007
- Prime Minister: Manasseh Sogavare
- Preceded by: Bartholomew Ulufa'alu
- Succeeded by: Francis Zama

Prime Minister of Solomon Islands
- In office 16 November 2011 – 9 December 2014
- Monarch: Elizabeth II
- Governor General: Frank Kabui
- Deputy: Manasseh Maelanga
- Preceded by: Danny Philip
- Succeeded by: Manasseh Sogavare

Member of Parliament
- Incumbent
- Assumed office 2024
- Preceded by: Alfred Efona
- Constituency: Central Honiara
- In office 2001–2014
- Preceded by: Jackson Piasi
- Succeeded by: Jimson Fiau Tanangada
- Constituency: Gizo/Kolombangara

Personal details
- Born: 28 August 1965 (age 61) Ghatere, British Solomon Islands
- Party: Solomon Islands Party for Rural Advancement
- Other political affiliations: National Coalition for Reform and Advancement
- Education: University of Papua New Guinea; Australian National University

Gordon Darcy Lilo (born 28 August 1965) is a Solomon Islander politician who served as the prime minister of Solomon Islands from 16 November 2011 to 9 December 2014. He was a member of the National Parliament of the Solomon Islands, representing the Gizo/Kolombangara constituency spanning Gizo and the island of Kolombangara in Western Province. Lilo currently serves as minister of finance, a position he previously held from 2006 to 2007 and from 2010 to 2011. He returned to the National Parliament representing the Central Honiara constituency in 2024.

== Biography ==
=== Personal life ===
Lilo is originally from the village of Ghatere on Kolombangara island. He earned a master's degree in development and administration from the Crawford School of Economics and Government at Australian National University. Lilo's CV also includes a Postgraduate Diploma and Bachelor of Economics received from the University of Papua New Guinea.

=== Career ===
Lilo worked as a permanent secretary for the Ministries of Finance and of the Environment before entering politics. He was elected to the National Parliament of the Solomon Islands in 2001 as an independent.

In 2006, he formed the Solomon Islands Party for Rural Advancement being its leader since then.

In November 2011, Prime Minister Danny Philip fired Lilo, his Finance Minister, and Central Bank Governor Rick Hou, accusing both of undermining his government. Philip had been accused of misusing and misappropriating a $10 million national development fund, which had been allocated to Solomon Islands from the government of Taiwan. In response to his sacking, Lilo told reporters, "No one undermined the prime minister, but he undermined himself by abusing his powers and the highest office in the country. He sacked us to create a vacuum to lure MPs from the opposition." Lilo further criticized Philips, "What he (Mr Philip) did was unbelievable, unacceptable and sickening."

=== Prime Minister of Solomon Islands ===
Prime Minister Danny Philip resigned on 11 November 2011, ahead of a vote of no confidence stemming from the allegations of the misuse of Taiwanese funds.

On 16 November 2011, Lilo was elected Prime Minister of Solomon Islands, winning a majority of the 29 of the 49 eligible members of Parliament and defeating three other rivals for the office. Former Prime Minister Manasseh Sogavare of East Choiseul received nine votes, MP for North Vella La Vella Milner Tozaka received nine votes, and MP for Gao/Bugotu Samuel Manetoali earned just two votes in parliament. Lilo was declared the winner by Governor General Sir Frank Kabui. Lilo took the oath of office before Kabui at approximately 5 p.m.

On 18 November, two days after his election, Lilo held his first official engagement with US ambassador to the Solomon Islands, Teddy Taylor regarding the Solomon Islands eligibility for US Millennium Challenge Account funding.

Lilo is a member of the National Coalition for Reform and Advancement (NCRA), the same party as his predecessor, Danny Philip. Lilo took over the leadership of the NCRA from Philips, which retains the Office of Prime Minister. Prime Minister Lilo completed his cabinet appointments by 23 November 2011, restoring almost all of ministers from the previous NCRA government to their posts. The only major change was Lilo's appointment of Rick Hou as the country's new finance minister. Lilo reappointed Manasseh Maelanga as deputy prime minister. Maelanga was also appointed Home Affairs Minister.

Lilo is a key supporter of the Regional Assistance Mission to Solomon Islands. Prime Minister Lilo pledged to refocus on Solomon Islands' faltering coconut industry at the opening 48th Asian Pacific Coconut Committee (APCC) Ministerial meeting, which was held at the Mendana Hotel in Honiara on 28 November 2011.

Lilo's government (backed by the governments of Nauru, Tuvalu, Vanuatu and Timor-Leste) introduced the motion which led to the United Nations General Assembly re-inscribing French Polynesia on the United Nations list of non-self-governing territories in May 2013. Lilo stated that he wished to see French Polynesia obtain self-determination regarding its future status. The day before the vote in the General Assembly, the Assembly of French Polynesia formally protested against the prospect of the country being re-added to the list. France denounced Solomon Islands-introduced motion as "blatant interference [and] a complete absence of respect for the democratic choice of [French] Polynesians", who had just elected a government hostile to the prospect of independence.

=== After Premiership ===
Lilo lost his seat in the Parliament of the Solomon Islands in the 2014 Solomon Islands general election to his nephew Jimson Fiau Tanangada. Lilo brought charges that Tanangada had bribed voters, resulting in a conviction and a by-election. Tanangada's wife Lanelle ran against Lilo in the by-election, defeating him with 2580 votes to 1593. She defeated him again in the April 2019 elections, with 4397 votes to 4002.

In the 2024 Solomon Islands general election, Jimson Tanangada was returned to the seat of Gizo/Kolombangara constituency, while Lilo was successful in standing for the Central Honiara constituency.

In May 2026, Lilo was sworn in as Minister for Finance and Treasury. He was dismissed from the ministry in September after he supported a no-confidence motion against prime minister Matthew Wale.

Political offices
Preceded by Danny Philip	Prime Minister of the Solomon Islands; 2011–2014	Succeeded by Manasseh Sogavare
