= Danny Philip =

Prime Minister of Solomon Islands (2010–2011)

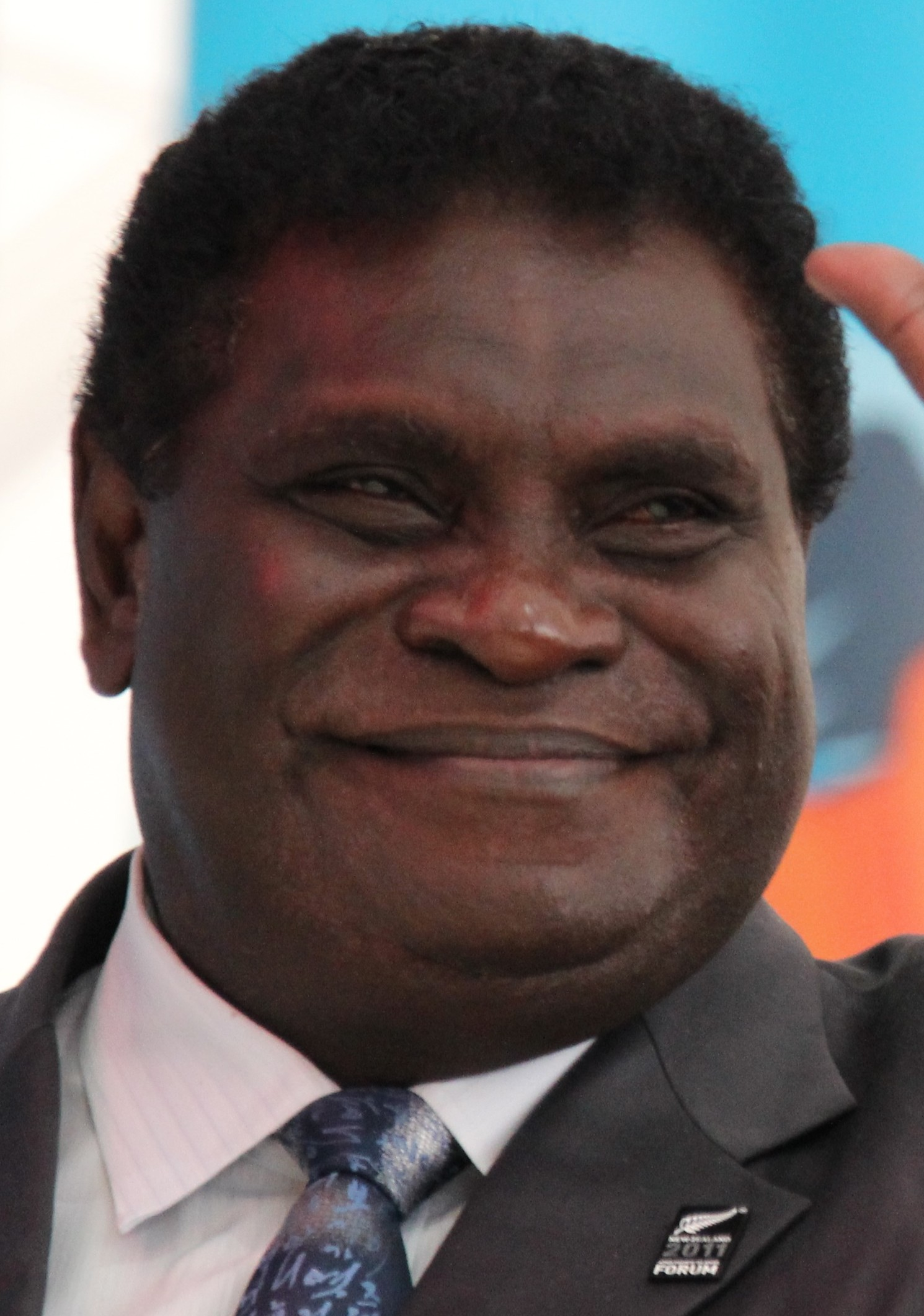
- Philip at the Pacific Islands Forum in Auckland (2011)

Prime Minister of Solomon Islands
- In office 25 August 2010 – 16 November 2011
- Monarch: Elizabeth II
- Governor General: Frank Kabui
- Deputy: Manasseh Maelanga
- Preceded by: Derek Sikua
- Succeeded by: Gordon Darcy Lilo

Member of Parliament for South New Georgia/Rendova/Tetepari

Personal details
- Born: 5 August 1953 (age 73) Lokuru, British Solomon Islands
- Party: United Democratic Party
- Other political affiliations: Reform Democratic Party (Before 2019); People's Progressive Party (Before 2000)
- Spouse: Margaret Philip

Danny Philip (born 5 August 1953) is a politician and diplomat from the Solomon Islands. He was the prime minister of Solomon Islands from 2010 to 2011. Previously he served as the minister of Foreign Affairs from 1995 to 1996 and from July 2000 to June 2001. He was the leader of the People's Progressive Party from 1997 to 2000, then founded the Reform Democratic Party, of which he was the leader when elected Prime Minister.

== Personal life ==
Danny Philip was born on 5 August 1953. His mother, who suffered from poliomyelitis, died just two days after his birth.

Philip has been an English teacher and linguist by profession. He is from the town of Lokuru, which is located on Rendova Island, Western Province. Philip is married to his current wife, Margaret Philip. He has two former wives from previous marriages.

== Political career ==
Philip previously served four terms in the National Parliament of Solomon Islands between 1984 and 2001. He represented the Vona Vona-Rendova-Tetepare constituency from 1984 until 1993. Philip was then elected as the MP from the South New Georgia-Rendova-Tetepare constituency from 1994 until 2001.

Philip served as the Solomon Islands' Foreign Minister for two tenures, from 1995 to 1996 and again from July 2000 to June 2001.

Philip is currently the Member of Parliament representing South New Georgia-Rendova-Tetepare as of 2019.

== Prime Minister of the Solomon Islands ==
Philip was narrowly elected the Prime Minister of the Solomon Islands on 24 August 2010, following the 2010 general election. Philip and his supporters, who constituted the so-called "Pacific Casino camp," narrowly defeated Steve Abana, the leader of the Solomon Islands Democratic Party, by just three votes: Philip received 26 votes while Abana garnered 23. He replaced caretaker Prime Minister Derek Sikua.

In a victory speech following the Prime Minister election, Philip stated that his first priority would be to form a new government. He said his government would actively support the country's Constitutional Reform process. This was one of his central campaign pledges, and the reason for creating the Reform Democratic Party.

Upon naming his Cabinet, he appointed Manasseh Maelanga as his deputy.

On 11 November 2011, after the defection of five ministers and seven backbenchers to the Opposition, Philip resigned rather than face a motion of no confidence. He led an interim government until Parliament elected a new Prime Minister on 16 November. Gordon Darcy Lilo, a member of Philip's National Coalition for Reform and Advancement, was elected as his successor on 16 November.

Philip elected to remain in parliament as a backbencher after leaving the Prime Minister's office.

Political offices
Preceded by Derek Sikua	Prime Minister of Solomon Islands; 2010–2011	Succeeded by Gordon Darcy Lilo
