= Derek Sikua =

Solomon Islands politician (born 1959)

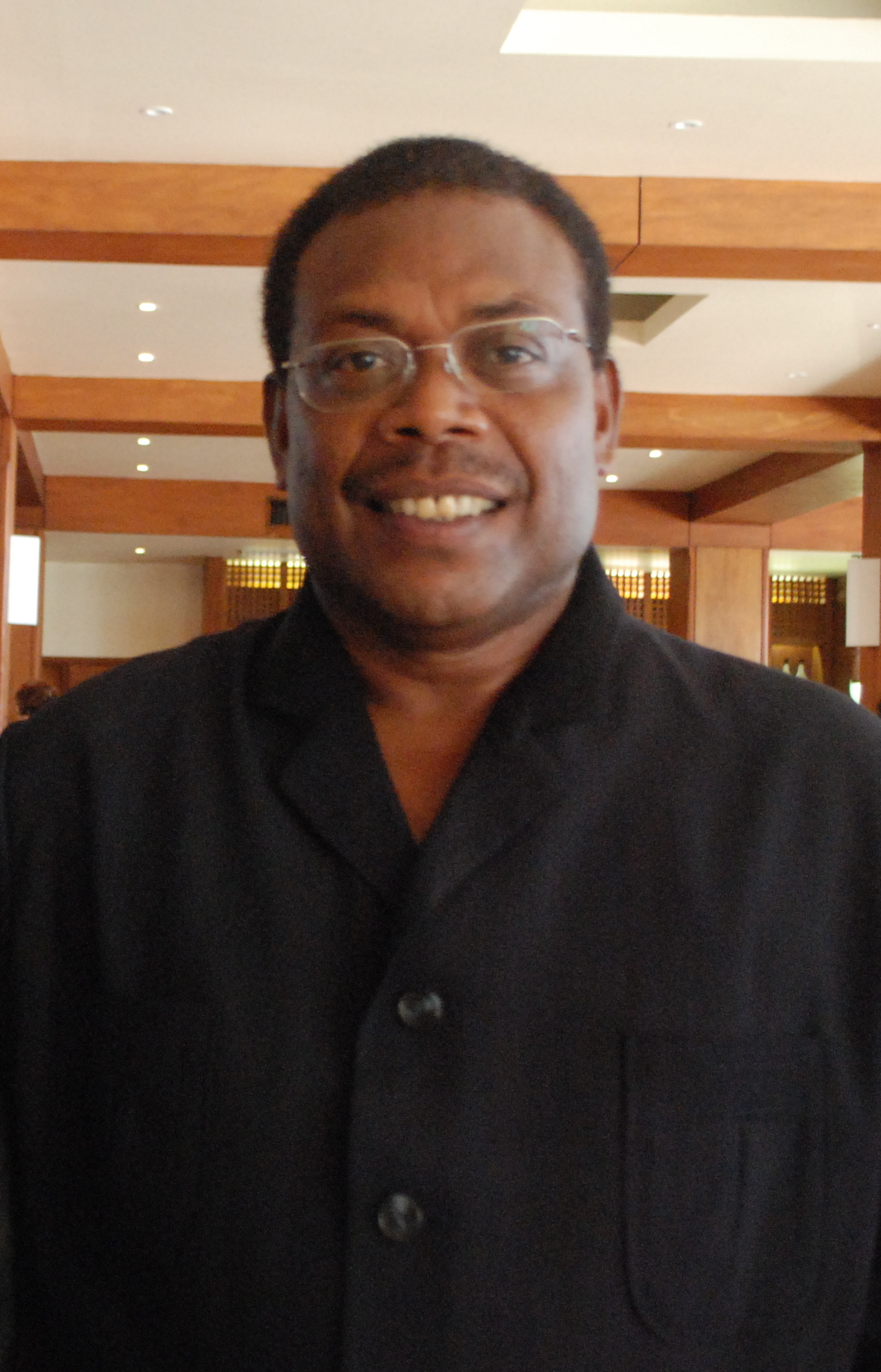
- Sikua in 2009

Prime Minister of Solomon Islands
- In office 20 December 2007 – 25 August 2010
- Monarch: Elizabeth II
- Governors General: Nathaniel Waena; Frank Kabui
- Preceded by: Manasseh Sogavare
- Succeeded by: Danny Philip

Leader of the Opposition
- In office 29 March 2011 – 17 December 2014
- Preceded by: Steve Abana
- Succeeded by: Jeremiah Manele

Personal details
- Born: 10 October 1959 (age 66) Ngalitavethi, British Solomon Islands (now in Guadalcanal Province, Solomon Islands)
- Party: Liberal Party
- Spouse: Doris Sikua

David Derek Sikua (born 10 October 1959) served as the prime minister of Solomon Islands from 20 December 2007 to 25 August 2010. He is a member of the Solomon Islands Liberal Party.

== Career ==
Sikua is from Ngalitavethi Village in Guadalcanal Province. He was Undersecretary of the Ministry of Education and Human Resources Development from April 1993 to February 1994; Permanent Secretary of the Ministry of Education and Human Resources Development from February 1994 to November 1997; then Permanent Secretary of the Ministry of Forests, Environment and Conservation from November 1997 to January 1998.

In 2003, he graduated from the University of Waikato, New Zealand, with a PhD in education. The university recognised him with a Distinguished Alumni Award in 2008.

Returning to the Solomon Islands he became Permanent Secretary with Special Duties at the Ministry of Education and Human Resources Development from May 2003 to 7 September 2003, then Permanent Secretary of the Ministry of Education and Human Resources Development from 8 September 2003 to 31 December 2005.

He was elected to the National Parliament in April 2006 (as MP for the North East Guadalcanal constituency) and became Minister of Education and Human Resources Development under Prime Minister Manasseh Sogavare on 4 May 2006. He joined the opposition in November 2007. After Sogavare was defeated on 13 December 2007 in a motion of no-confidence, which was put forward by Sikua, Sikua was the opposition's candidate to replace him. He was elected Prime Minister by Parliament on 20 December 2007, receiving 32 votes against 15 for government candidate Patteson Oti. He was sworn in on the same day, and his Cabinet was sworn in on 21 December and 22 December.

He lost power following the August 2010 general election. Though he retained his seat in Parliament, as the sole MP for the Liberal Party, he did not contest the premiership, and Danny Philip succeeded him. On 29 March 2011, he was elected Leader of the Opposition. On 15 December 2014, following a general election, he was appointed Minister for Education and Human Resources by new Prime Minister Manasseh Sogavare.

Political offices
Preceded by Manasseh Sogavare	Prime Minister of Solomon Islands; 2007–2010	Succeeded by Danny Philip
