= 11th Parliament of Solomon Islands =

2019 to 2024 membership of the Solomon Islands Parliament

The 11th Parliament of Solomon Islands was the sitting of the National Parliament of Solomon Islands from 2019 to 2024. They were elected in the 2019 Solomon Islands general election.

== Members ==
| Constituency | Elected MP | Party | Votes | % |
|---|---|---|---|---|
| Aoke/Langalanga | Matthew Wale | Solomon Islands Democratic Party | 3,712 | 46.9% |
| Baegu/Asifola | Makario Tagini | United Democratic Party | 3,028 | 31.7% |
| Central Guadalcanal | Peter Shanel Agovaka | Independent | 3,584 | 47.7% |
| Central Honiara | John Moffat Fugui | United Democratic Party | 4,028 | 33.4% |
| Central Kwara'ae | Jackson Fiulaua | Independent | 3,200 | 43.1% |
| Central Makira | Nestor Ghiro | Independent | 3,803 | 70.4% |
| East ꞌAreꞌare | Peter Junior Kenilorea | Solomon Islands United Party | 4,200 | 60.2% |
| East Central Guadalcanal | Ishmael Avui | Kadere Party | 3,187 | 50.3% |
| East Choiseul | Manasseh Sogavare | Independent | 1,860 | 59.3% |
| East Guadalcanal | Bradley Tovosia | Independent | 3,985 | 69.2% |
| East Honiara | Douglas Ete | Solomon Islands Democratic Party | 5,710 | 47.9% |
| East Kwaio | Stanley Festus Sofu | Independent | 3,949 | 62.4% |
| East Makira | Charles Maefai | Independent | 3,740 | 52.2% |
| East Malaita | Manaseh Maelanga | People's Alliance Party | 2,966 | 56.8% |
| Fataleka | Rex Ramofafia | Solomon Islands United Party | 2,628 | 41.2% |
| Gao/Bugotu | Samuel Manetoali | Kadere Party of Solomon Islands | 2,457 | 50.9% |
| Gizo/Kolombangara | Lanelle Olandrea Tanangada | Kadere Party | 4,397 | 51.7% |
| Hograno/Kia/Havulei | Jeremiah Manele | Democratic Alliance Party | 4,568 | 73.5% |
| Lau/Mbaelelea | Augustine Auga | Independent | 4,728 | 49.2% |
| Malaita Outer Islands | Martin Kealoe | Solomon Islands Democratic Party | 1,219 | 44.0% |
| Maringe/Kokota | Culwick Togamana | Democratic Alliance Party | 2,462 | 46.1% |
| Marovo | Chachabule Rebi Amoi | People First Party | 5,619 | 59.3% |
| Nggella | Batholomew Parapolo | Kadere Party | 2,512 | 26.1% |
| North East Guadalcanal | Jaimie Vokia | Independent | 1,835 | 38.5% |
| North Guadalcanal | Samson Maneka | Solomon Islands Democratic Party | 2,320 | 41.3% |
| North Malaita | Senley Filualea | Independent | 2,698 | 38.9% |
| North New Georgia | John Dean Kuku | Independent | 2,267 | 64.1% |
| North Vella La Vella | Clezy Rore | United Democratic Party | 2,232 | 54.5% |
| North West Choiseul | Harry Kuma | Independent | 2,948 | 51.3% |
| North West Guadalcanal | Bodo Dettke | Solomon Islands Democratic Party | 3,021 | 52.5% |
| Ranongga/Simbo | Charles Sigoto | Solomon Islands Democratic Party | 2,592 | 57.5% |
| Rennell/Bellona | Tautai Agikimu'a Kaitu'u | Independent | 837 | 27.7% |
| Russells/Savo | Dickson Mua | Independent | 2,027 | 32.1% |
| Shortlands | Christopher Laore | People's Alliance Party | 1,978 | 67.7% |
| South Choiseul | Robertson Galokale | Independent | 999 | 19.1% |
| South Guadalcanal | Rolland Seleso | Solomon Islands Party for Rural Advancement | 3,104 | 47.9% |
| Small Malaita | Rick Nelson Houenipwela | Democratic Alliance Party | 2,302 | 33.6% |
| South New Georgia/Rendova/Tetepari | Danny Philip | United Democratic Party | 1,577 | 43.9% |
| South Vella La Vella | Frederick Kologeto | Independent | 2,932 | 55.5% |
| Temotu Nende | Commins Mewa | Kadere Party | 1,579 | 32.1% |
| Temotu Pele | Dudley Kopu | Independent | 1,710 | 43.8% |
| Temotu Vatud | Freda Soria Comua | Kadere Party | 1,344 | 47.2% |
| Ulawa/Ugi | William Marau | Kadere Party | 1,778 | 52.2% |
| West ꞌAreꞌare | John Maneniaru | Kadere Party | 3,223 | 55.9% |
| West Guadalcanal | Anthony Veke | Independent | 4,407 | 62.8% |
| West Honiara | Namson Tran | Independent | 5,683 | 66.3% |
| West Kwaio | Titus Fika | Independent | 1,697 | 30.6% |
| West Kwara'ae | Sam Iduri | Solomon Islands Democratic Party | 1,996 | 23.3% |
| West Makira | Rawcliff Manu'ari | Solomon Islands Democratic Party | 2,637 | 43.3% |
| West New Georgia/Vona Vona | Silas Kerry Vagara | Independent | 1,888 | 27.9% |
Source: SIEC (results), SIEC (party affiliations)

== Changes ==
Ethel Lency Vokia won a by-election in 2020 to replace her husband Jaimie Vokia in the North East Guadalcanal constituency.
