= List of Solomon Islands by-elections =

This is a list of by-elections to the National Parliament of Solomon Islands since the First Parliament in 1976, with the names of the incumbent and victor and (when known) their respective parties. Where seats changed political party at the election, and where that change is known, the result is highlighted: yellow for a Democratic Party gain.

The source for most of this information is the parliamentary website.

== First Parliament (1976–1980) ==
By-election	Date	Incumbent	Party	Winner	Party	Cause
Vona Vona-Rendova-Tetepare	1977	Francis Aqorau	(unknown)	John Talasasa	(unknown)	Death
West Kwara'ae	1978	Fr. John Gerea	(unknown)	Allan Taki	(unknown)	Resignation

== Second Parliament (1980–1984) ==
None.

== Third Parliament (1984–1989) ==
By-election	Date	Incumbent	Party	Winner	Party	Cause
West Guadalcanal	1985	George Kejoa	Independent	George Kejoa	Independent	
West ꞌAreꞌare	1985	David Kausimae	People's Alliance Party	Andrew Nori	People's Alliance Party	
Gizo/Kolombangara	1985	George Ngumi	Independent	Joini Tutua	People's Alliance Party	

== Fourth Parliament (1989–1993) ==
By-election	Date	Incumbent	Party	Winner	Party	Cause
North East Guadalcanal	1989	Waita Ben Tabusasi	Independent	Hilda Kari	People's Alliance Party	Elected Speaker
East Honiara	1990	Bartholomew Ulufa'alu	Liberal Party	Charles Dausabea	(unknown)	Resignation
East ꞌAreꞌare	1992	Peter Kenilorea	United Party	Edward Huni'ehu	(unknown)	Resignation

== Fifth Parliament (1993–1997) ==
By-election	Date	Incumbent	Party	Winner	Party	Cause
East Honiara	1994	Charles Dausabea	SIGNUR	John Maetia Kauluae	(unknown)	Petitioned

== Sixth Parliament (1997–2001) ==
By-election	Date	Incumbent	Party	Winner	Party	Cause
West Makira	January 2000	Solomon Mamaloni	People's Progressive Party	Jackson Suna'one	(unknown)	Death (kidney disease)
Gao/Bugotu	June 2001	James Tarasele Saliga	(unknown)	William Harry Gigini	(unknown)	Death

== Seventh Parliament (2001–2006) ==
By-election	Date	Incumbent	Party	Winner	Party	Cause
Gao/Bugotu	27 November 2002	Eric Notere	(unknown)	Basil Manelegua	AIMP	Petitioned
South Guadalcanal	27 November 2002	Augustine Geve	(unknown)	Victor Totu	(unknown)	Assassinated
North Malaita	1 December 2004	Daniel Fa'afunua	People's Alliance	Daniel Enele Kwanairara	(unknown)	Disqualified
Ulawa/Ugi	1 December 2004	Nathaniel Waena	(unknown)	James Tora	(unknown)	Elected Governor-General

== Eighth Parliament (2006–2010) ==
By-election	Date	Incumbent	Party	Winner	Party	Cause
East Malaita	27 March 2008	Joses Wawari Sanga	National Party	Manasseh Maelanga	(unknown)	unknown
Aoke/Langalanga	28 March 2008	Bartholomew Ulufa'alu	Liberal Party	Matthew Cooper Wale	Democratic Party	Death
Lau/Mbaelelea	23 September 2008	Bentley Samuel Rogosomani	Independent	Walter Folotalu	(unknown)	unknown
East Honiara	25 September 2008	Charles Dausabea	Independent	Silas Milikada	(unknown)	Jailed following conviction for fraud
Central Guadalcanal	6 May 2009	Peter Shanel Agovaka	Independent	Peter Shanel Agovaka (Incumbent re-elected)	Independent	unknown
Russells/Savo	29 October 2009	Allan Kemakeza	People's Alliance	Allan Kemakeza (Incumbent re-elected)	People's Alliance	Jailed following conviction for "demanding with menace, intimidation and larceny"

== Ninth Parliament (2010–2014) ==
By-election	Date	Incumbent	Party	Winner	Party	Cause
Shortlands	30 March 2011	Steve Laore	Independent	Christopher Laore	Independent	Death
Baegu/Asifola	30 March 2011	Toswel Kaua	Independent	David Tome	Independent	Death
North Malaita	1 August 2012	Jimmy Lusibaea	Independent	Vika Lusibaea	Independent	Gaoled following conviction for assault and grievous bodily harm
East ꞌAreꞌare	1 August 2012	Andrew Hanaria	People's Congress	Andrew Manepora'a	Independent	Petitioned
Nggela	27 February 2013	Mark Kemakeza	Liberal Party	Johnley Hatimoana	(unknown)	Gaoled for embezzlement.

== Tenth Parliament (2014–2019) ==
By-election	Date	Incumbent	Party	Winner	Party	Cause
Gizo/Kolombangara	23 May 2018	Jimson Fiau Tanangada	United Democratic Party	Lanelle Tanangada	Independent	Convicted of bribing voters

== Eleventh Parliament (2019–2024) ==
By-election	Date	Incumbent	Party	Winner	Party	Cause
East Makira	11 December 2019	Charles Maefai	Independent	Lillian Maefai	Independent	Death
North East Guadalcanal	18 November 2020	Jaimie Vokia	Independent	Ethel Lency Vokia	Independent	Found guilty of bribing voters.
Central Honiara	18 November 2020	John Moffat Fugui	United Democratic Party	Alfred Efona	United Party	Found guilty of bribery
South Choiseul	19 May 2021	Robertson Galokale	Independent	Sammy Galo	Independent	Petitioned
West Kwaio	21 September 2022	Titus Mokofi Fika	Independent	Claudius Tei'ifi	United Party	Death
West Kwara'ae	24 May 2023	Sam Iduri	Independent	Alfred Tuasulia	Independent	Death

== Twelfth Parliament (2024-) ==
By-election	Date	Incumbent	Party	Winner	Party	Cause
West Guadalcanal	4 June 2025	Moses Garu	Democratic Party			Death

== Notable by-elections ==
The 1989 by-election in the North-East Guadalcanal constituency, prompted by Waita Ben Tabusasi's election as Speaker, resulted in a woman, Hilda Kari, being elected to Parliament for the first time.
