= Shadow Cabinet of Solomon Islands =

The Shadow Cabinet of Solomon Islands is the parliamentary Opposition's alternative Cabinet in Solomon Islands. Solomon Islands is a Commonwealth realm with a Westminster system of government; the Shadow Cabinet is modelled on the British institution of the same name.

The Opposition is formally known as "Her Majesty's Official Opposition".

== Current Shadow Cabinet ==
The current Shadow Cabinet was appointed by Opposition Leader Steve Abana on 31 August 2010, following the general election on 4 August, and Abana's unsuccessful attempt to be elected to the premiership. It shadows Prime Minister Danny Philip's coalition Cabinet. Abana's Shadow Cabinet is also a coalition, albeit primarily composed of members of the Democratic Party.

Stanley Sofu, initially appointed Shadow Minister for Infrastructure Development, defected to the government in December 2010.

On 20 January 2011, citing dissatisfaction with the Cabinet being "manipulated by one or two people", Bodo Dettke (Minister for Fisheries), Douglas Ete (Minister for Forestry), Martin Sopage (Minister for Lands and Housing) and Mark Kemakeza (Minister for Mines, Energy and Rural Electrification) all left the government and formally joined Abana's Opposition. It was not immediately made clear what positions they might be given in a Shadow Cabinet reshuffle.

In late March 2011, Abana resigned from the leadership of the Opposition, reportedly under pressure from certain members, and Derek Sikua was elected by Opposition MPs to replace him. A week later, Abana defected to the government, along with four other members of the Opposition (Ricky Houeniopwela, Andrew Hanaria Keniasia, Connelly Sandakabatu and Peter Tom). This split reportedly brought the Opposition numbers down to just six, of which Opposition leader Derek Sikua and his deputy Matthew Wale.

Shadow Portfolio	Shadow Minister	Political party	Constituency
Leader of the Opposition; Minister for Public Service	Steve Abana	Democratic Party	Fataleka
Deputy Shadow Prime Minister; Minister for Education and Human Resources Development; Shadow Minister for the Environment, Conservation and Meteorology	Matthew Wale	Democratic Party	Aoke-Langalanga
Shadow Minister for Home Affairs	Peter Tom	Democratic Party	West Kwaio
Shadow Minister for Agriculture and Livestock	Connolly Sandagapatu	Independent	North-West Choiseul
Shadow Minister for Commerce, Industry, Labour and Immigration	John Maneniaru	Independent	West ꞌAreꞌare
Shadow Minister for Communication and Aviation; Shadow Minister for Police, National Security and Correctional services	Walter Folotalu	Democratic Party	Lau/Mbaelelea
Shadow Minister for Culture and Tourism	Seth Gukuna	Independent	Rennell-Bellona
Shadow Minister for Fisheries and Marine Resources	Andrew Hanaria Keniasina	People's Congress Party	East ꞌAreꞌare
Shadow Minister for Foreign Affairs and External Trade; Shadow Minister for Justice and Legal Affairs	Milner Tozaka	People's Alliance Party	North Vella Lavella
Shadow Minister for Forestry	Job Dudley Tausinga	Party for Rural Advancement	North New Georgia
Shadow Minister for Health and Medical Services	Dickson Mua Panakitasi	OUR Party	Savo-Russels
Shadow Minister for Infrastructure Development	?	-	-
Shadow Minister for Lands, Housing and Survey; Shadow Minister for National Planning and Aid Coordination	Manasseh Sogavare	OUR Party	East Choiseul
Shadow Minister for Mines, Energy and Rural Electrification	David Dei Pacha	Democratic Party	South Guadalcanal
Shadow Minister for National Unity, Reconciliation and Peace	Sam Iduri	Democratic Party	West Kwara'ae
Shadow Minister for Provincial Government and Institutional strengthening	Alfred Ghiro	Democratic Party	East Makira
Shadow Minister for Rural Development and Indigenous Affairs	Moses Garu	Democratic Party	West Guadalcanal
Shadow Minister for Women, Youth and Children Affairs	Silas Tausinga	Party for Rural Advancement	West New Georgia
Shadow Minister for Finance and the Treasury	Rick Houenipwela	Democratic Party	Small Malaita
