= 2012 North Malaita by-election =

A by-election was held in the North Malaita constituency in Solomon Islands on 1 August 2012. It was initially scheduled for the month of March, then delayed.

In the August 2010 general election, the seat was won by independent candidate Jimmy "Rasta" Lusibaea, a former warlord during the ethnic unrest of 1999-2003. He was appointed Minister for Fisheries by new Prime Minister Danny Philip. Lusibaea lost his seat on 30 November 2010 upon being sentenced to two years and nine months in jail for assault and grievous bodily harm, for events committed during the unrest. On 20 January 2011, the Minister for Police, James Tora, remitted Lusibaea's sentence to one month, using his discretion as Minister under section 38 of the Correctional Service Act. Consequently, Lusibaea was no longer barred from occupying his seat, and resumed his functions in Parliament. On 17 October, the High Court ruled that the remit did not amount to a court-sanctioned reduction in sentence, and Lusibaea lost his seat once more, necessitating a by-election.

In early April 2012, the by-election having not yet been held, Deputy Prime Minister and Minister for Home Affairs Manasseh Maelanga explained that there was legal uncertainty as to whether Lusibaea could stand as a candidate. This was also affecting the scheduled by-election in East ꞌAreꞌare, in which MP Andrew Hanaria had lost his seat upon having been found to have bribed voters, but was seeking to stand for reelection. Maelanga stated that legal advice was being sought from the Attorney General, who was abroad, before a date for the two by-elections could be set.

On 20 June, a date was finally announced for the by-election. The ten candidates were as follows. They included a former MP for the constituency, Danny Fa'afunua; and Fredrick Kwanairara, the 28-year-old son of former North Malaita MP Daniel Enele Kwanairara. Jimmy Lusibaea was "barred from re-contesting the by-elections because he [was] still serving his sentence outside of prison", but his wife, Vika Lusibaea, stood in his place.

Vika Lusibaea won the seat by a large margin, becoming only the second ever woman to be elected to the National Parliament of Solomon Islands, following Hilda Kari in the 1990s. There was some slight controversy over her victory, critics drawing attention to the fact she was a Fiji-born naturalized citizen, and to her "limited literacy skills".

== Results ==
Candidate	Votes	%
Vika Lusibaea	2,802	49.46
Fredrick Kwanairara	901	15.90
Senley Levi Filualea	675	11.92
Peter Fairamoa	503	8.88
Daniel Ratai Fa'afunua	269	4.75
Joel Moffat Konofilia	248	4.38
Wilfred Baetalua	189	3.34
Felix Maeli Abuofa	51	0.90
George Sensie	23	0.41
Ben Fruits O'Bana	4	0.07
Total	5,665	100.00
Valid votes	5,665	99.51
Invalid/blank votes	28	0.49
Total votes	5,693	100.00
Registered voters/turnout	9,188	61.96

== See also ==
- List of Solomon Islands by-elections
