= Vokia =

Vokia is a surname. Notable people with the surname include:

- Ethel Lency Vokia, Solomon Islands politician
- Jaimie Vokia, Solomon Islands politician
