= Ghiro =

Ghiro is a surname. Notable people with the surname include:

- Alfred Ghiro (born 1968), Solomon Islands politician
- Bernard Ghiro (born 1960), Solomon Islands politician
- Nestor Ghiro (born 1972), Solomon Islands politician
