= Hypolite Taremae =

Solomon Islands politician (born 1968)

The Right Honourable Hypolite Taremae MP

Minister for National Unity, Reconciliation and Peace
- In office 27 August 2010 – 11 November 2011; 21 November 2011 – 8 September 2014
- Prime Minister: Danny Philip, Gordon Darcy Lilo
- Preceded by: Sam Iduri

Member of Parliament for Central Makira
- In office 4 August 2010 – 19 November 2014
- Preceded by: Bernard Ghiro
- Succeeded by: Nestor Ghiro

Personal details
- Born: 4 April 1968 (age 58) Bagohane Village, Makira Province
- Party: Independent

Hypolite Taremae (born 4 April 1968) is a Solomon Islands politician.

== Biography ==
Taramae was born in Bagohane Village, Makira Province. After graduating from Honiara Solomon Islands College of Higher Education, he worked as a teacher.

His career in national politics began when he was elected to Parliament as the member for Central Makira in the August 2010 general election, standing as an independent candidate. He was then appointed Minister for National Unity, Reconciliation and Peace in Prime Minister Danny Philip's Cabinet, in the context of the country's efforts towards national reconciliation and unity after the ethnic violence of the late 1990s and early 2000s. When Gordon Darcy Lilo replaced Philip as Prime Minister in November 2011, Taremae retained his position in government.

In January 2012, Taremae was assaulted in a street one evening around midnight, by an unidentified man who punched him on the nose before escaping in a car. The reason for the assault is not known. Suffering from "severe bruises to his nose, eyes and head", Taremae underwent a three-hour operation in hospital.

He lost his seat in the 2014 elections when he was defeated by Nestor Ghiro.
