= 2012 East ꞌAreꞌare by-election =

A by-election was held in the East ꞌAreꞌare constituency in the Solomon Islands on 1 August 2012. It was initially scheduled for the month of March, then delayed.

In the August 2010 general election, the seat was won by Andrew Hanaria, of the People's Congress Party; he entered Parliament for the first time. He was appointed Minister for Aviation and Communication by new Prime Minister Danny Philip. His election was voided by the High Court on 7 December 2011, as he was found to have bribed voters in his constituency with cash and material goods before the election. He will not be permitted to stand in the by-election.

Sir Peter Kenilorea, who led the country during its period of transition to independence from the United Kingdom in 1978, announced his intention to stand in the by-election. (He served as Chief Minister then Prime Minister from 1976 to 1981, and from 1984 to 1986, before retiring from active politics in 1991, and returning as Speaker of Parliament from 2001 to 2005.)

In early April 2012, the by-election having not yet been held, Deputy Prime Minister and Minister for Home Affairs Manasseh Maelanga explained that there was legal uncertainty as to whether Hanaria could stand as a candidate. This was also affecting the scheduled by-election in North Malaita, in which MP Jimmy Lusibaea had lost his seat upon conviction for assault and grievous bodily harm, for events committed a decade earlier, but was seeking to stand for reelection. Maelanga stated that legal advice was being sought from the Attorney General, who was abroad, before a date for the two by-elections could be set.

On 20 June, a date was finally announced for the by-election: 1 August. The four candidates were as follows. Andrew Manepora'a, an economist and head of the anti-money laundering unit of the Central Bank of Solomon Islands, won the seat by a comfortable margin; Sir Peter Kenilorea came third.

== Results ==
| Candidate | Party | Votes | % |
|---|---|---|---|
| Andrew Manepora'a | Independent | 2,157 | 53.97 |
| Aliki Tokii Ha'apio | Independent | 1,228 | 30.72 |
| Peter Kenilorea | Solomon Islands United Party | 460 | 11.51 |
| Claudius Horiwapu | Independent | 152 | 3.80 |
| Total | | 3,997 | 100.00 |
| Valid votes | | 3,997 | 100.00 |
| Invalid/blank votes | | 0 | 0.00 |
| Total votes | | 3,997 | 100.00 |
| Registered voters/turnout | | 6,575 | 60.79 |

== See also ==
- List of Solomon Islands by-elections
