= Truth and Reconciliation Commission Act 2008 =

- An Act to make provisions for the establishment of a Truth and Reconciliation Commission.
- Enacted by: National Parliament of Solomon Islands
- Date assented to: September 4, 2008
- Introduced by: Sam Iduri
- Amnesty Act 2000; Amnesty Act 2001
- Establishes the Truth and Reconciliation Commission and defines its aims, powers and functions.

The Truth And Reconciliation Commission Act 2008 is an Act of the eighth National Parliament of Solomon Islands establishing the country's Truth and Reconciliation Commission.

The bill was introduced by MP Sam Iduri, Minister for Peace and Reconciliation, then adopted by Parliament on August 28, 2008. It was assented to "in Her Majesty's name and on Her Majesty's behalf" by Governor-General Nathaniel Waena on September 4, and was thereby enacted.

The preamble of the act references the fact that

"in or around 1998, an armed conflict erupted on Guadalcanal between the Guadalcanal militant groups, Isatabu Freedom Movement (IFM), Guadalcanal Revolutionary Army (GRA) and Guadalcanal Liberation Front (GLF) and the Malaita Eagle Force (MEF) of East Guadalcanal consisting of South Malaitan Settlers".

The preamble goes on to mention the violence and "gross violations of human rights" which took place during the conflict, followed by the establishment of peace and efforts towards reconciliation. The purpose of the act is given as establishing "a forum in which both the victims and the perpetrators of human rights violations [can] share their experiences so as to get a clearer understanding of the past in order to facilitate healing and true reconciliation". The preamble also sets the Act within the continuation of the Amnesty Act 2000 and the Amnesty Act 2001.

The act goes on to provide the functions of the Commission, defines its powers, and the means whereby it shall "promote national unity and reconciliation".

== See also ==
- Truth and Reconciliation Commission (Solomon Islands)
- History of Solomon Islands
- 8th Parliament of Solomon Islands
