= Afu Billy =

Solomon Islands women's rights activist

Afu Lia Billy
- Born: 1959 (age 66–67); Kwai, Malaita Province, Solomon Islands
- Occupations: Woman’s rights activist and writer
- Known for: Setting up the Solomon Islands National Council of Women and serving as general secretary of the organization from 1984 to 1988

Afu Lia Billy (born 1959) is a women's rights activist and writer in Solomon Islands. Since the late 1970s, she has worked to promote women's rights and combat violence against women, including through work with various local and international NGOs.

== Early life and education ==
Afu Billy was born in 1959 on the small island of Kwai, in Solomon Islands' Malaita Province. Her parents, Ariel Billy and Crystal Ufariaia, were evangelical leaders with the South Seas Evangelical Church. Billy, who describes her upbringing as strict, was sent to live with her uncle in the capital, Honiara, in order to receive a better education. She became the only member of her family to attend high school, part of the first generation of women in Solomon Islands to access secondary education.

Billy was married at a young age, in her early 20s, and had two daughters. Her husband became physically violent with her after a few years of marriage, and she pursued a divorce despite her family's disapproval.

After her divorce, she attended Charles Sturt University in Australia, where she graduated with a bachelor's degree in business management in 1992.

== Activism ==
Billy is a longtime activist with various women's groups in the Solomon Islands. She helped set up the Solomon Islands National Council of Women and served as general secretary of the organization from 1984 to 1988. She also served on the board of the Solomon Islands YWCA beginning in 1979. More recently, she served as co-chair of Women's Rights Action Movement. Billy also helped establish the Family Support Centre, a secular organization working to combat violence against women and children.

She has worked for various nongovernmental and intergovernmental organizations, including the Commonwealth Youth Programme, Save the Children Australia, and the United Nations Development Program.

== Political career ==
In the 2001 Solomon Islands general election, Billy ran for the National Parliament to represent the East Malaita constituency, in affiliation with the Solomon Islands Alliance for Change political alliance. However, she lost by just two votes to her in-law Joses Wawari Sanga. She ran again in the 2006 election but again fell short of gaining office.

Billy returned to politics in 2014, joining the People First Party as youth advisor and vice president.

== Writing ==
In addition to her activism, Billy has also worked as a journalist, including for the government's information service from 1978 to 1981. She helped found the women's information network Vois Blong Mere Solomon. Until 1982, she also hosted a radio program for the Solomon Islands Broadcasting Corporation, Olgeta Mere ("Women").

She has also written fiction, primarily short stories. In 1983, she co-edited the collection Mi Mere: Poetry and Prose by Solomon Islands Women Writers alongside Hazel Lulei and Jully Makini. The collection contains her stories "Loke" and "Against My Will."

== Personal life ==
In addition to her two daughters with her former husband, Billy has two sons with a former partner.
