= North East Guadalcanal constituency =

Solomon Islands parliamentary constituency

North East Guadalcanal
- Constituency for the Solomon Islands
- Region: Guadalcanal Province

Current constituency
- Created: 1976
- Party: Kadere Party
- Member: Ethel Vokia

North East Guadalcanal is a parliamentary constituency electing one representative to the National Parliament of Solomon Islands. It is one of eight constituencies in Guadalcanal Province. It had an electorate of 5,584 in 2006.

The North East Guadalcanal constituency has existed since the First Parliament in 1976. Its inaugural MP was Waita Ben Tabusasi.

In 1989, Tabusasi was elected Speaker, thereby vacating his seat and prompting a bye-election. The latter resulted in a woman being elected to the National Parliament for the first time – Hilda Kari. Kari retained a seat in the 1993 general election, but as candidate for East Central Guadalcanal; the North East Guadalcanal seat was won by Sir Baddley Devesi.

Currently, the MP for North East Guadalcanal is Dr Derek Sikua, who was Prime Minister from 2007 to 2010. He first won the seat in 2006, and retained it in the 2010 general election. In 2010, he faced five other candidates, all of them independents, whereas he stood as candidate for the Liberal Party. He won by an overwhelming margin, with 2,535 votes - well ahead of second-placed candidate Alfred Lovanitila, who obtained 887.

== Members of Parliament by year ==
The following MPs have represented North East Guadalcanal in the National Parliament, since the seat was created in 1976.

Election	MP	Party
1976	Waita Ben Tabusasi	
1980	Waita Ben Tabusasi	
1984	Daniel Sande	
1989	Waita Ben Tabusasi	
1989 by-election	Hilda Kari	
1993	Baddley Devesi	
1997	Baddley Devesi	
2001	Stephen Paeni	
2006	Derek Sikua	Liberal Party
2010	Derek Sikua	Liberal Party
2019	Jaimie Vokia	Independent
2020 by-election	Ethel Vokia	Independent
2024	Ethel Vokia	Kadere Party
