= 2011 Baegu/Asifola by-election =

A by-election was held in the Baegu/Asifola constituency in the Solomon Islands on 30 March 2011. The election followed the death of MP Toswel Kaua, an Independent, who had first won the seat in April 2006, and held it in the August 2010 general election.

David Tome won the by-election with 1,366 votes, amounting to 21.4% of valid votes cast. Henry Ologa Olebeni came second with 1,117 votes.

== Results ==
Candidate	Votes	%
David Tome	1,366	21.41
Henry Ologa Olobeni	1,117	17.51
Makario Tagini	1,048	16.42
Siau Mana	855	13.40
Martin Saefafia	521	8.16
Edgar Maoma Kaua	512	8.02
Duddley Wate	411	6.44
Robert Dolaiasi Kaua	177	2.77
James Kili	177	2.77
Frederick Waiti	118	1.85
John Maga Falasi	34	0.53
Timothy Amao	29	0.45
Duddley Iasuri	16	0.25
Total	6,381	100.00
Valid votes	6,381	99.56
Invalid/blank votes	28	0.44
Total votes	6,409	100.00
Registered voters/turnout	10,173	63.00

== See also ==
- List of Solomon Islands by-elections
