= 2008 East Honiara by-election =

Most populated Solomon Islands Constituency

The East Honiara by-election, 2008 was a by-election for the East Honiara constituency in the National Parliament of Solomon Islands. East Honiara is by far the most heavily populated constituency in Solomon Islands, with an electorate of over 30,000.

The election was precipitated by the arrest, conviction for fraud and jailing of sitting MP Charles Dausabea, who had held the seat since the 2006 general election.

A total of twenty-six candidates stood in the by-election. Among them was a former MP, Alfred Sasako. The election was held on September 25, 2008, in thirty-nine polling stations. The Solomon Times reported that many voters and other residents stayed "around to watch the whole day", viewing the election as "entertainment". The newspaper also reported that the election was "filled with drama, with candidates and supporters accusing certain camps of corrupt dealings".

== Results ==
The following candidates finished first, second and third, respectively. Silas Milikada -described by the Solomon Times as a "private businessman"- was duly elected MP for East Honiara. Dr. George Manimu contested the result, claiming "corrupt dealings and voting irregularities", unsuccessfully.

Candidate	Votes	%
Milikada Miller Silas	3,435	33.49
George Mamimu	1,071	10.44
Edward Jacob Ronia	973	9.49
Makario Tagini	728	7.10
Simeon Bouro	699	6.81
Jack Donga	626	6.10
Alfred Solomon Sasako	484	4.72
Robert Gerea	337	3.29
Alfred Maetia	325	3.17
Leslie Winston Kakai	320	3.12
Timothy Omani	211	2.06
Andrew Kuvu	174	1.70
Delmah Lavina Nori	126	1.23
Peterson Boso	99	0.97
Yukio Sato	93	0.91
Joseph Baetolingia	87	0.85
Moses Ramo	71	0.69
Charles Aiwosuga Cheka'a	70	0.68
John Ashley	51	0.50
Ramon Quitales	48	0.47
Ellison Ryan Sade	46	0.45
Kerry Wate	45	0.44
Damien James Teobasi	42	0.41
David Dausabea	39	0.38
Collin Bentley	31	0.30
Wilfred Bello Faari	27	0.26
Total	10,258	100.00
Valid votes	10,258	96.80
Invalid/blank votes	339	3.20
Total votes	10,597	100.00

== See also ==
- List of Solomon Islands by-elections
