= Bodo Dettke =

Solomon Islands politician (born 1967)

The Right Honourable Heinz Horst Bodo Dettke MP

Minister of Fisheries & Marine Resources
- In office 8 December 2010 – 21 January 2011
- Prime Minister: Danny Philip
- Preceded by: Jimmy Lusibaea
- Succeeded by: Braddley Tovosia

Minister of Forestry
- In office 26 August 2010 – 30 November 2010
- Prime Minister: Danny Philip
- Succeeded by: Douglas Ete

Member of Parliament for North West Guadalcanal
- Incumbent
- Assumed office 4 August 2010
- Preceded by: Siriako Usa

Personal details
- Born: 27 February 1967 (age 59)
- Party: Independent

Heinz Horst Bodo Dettke (born 27 February 1967), better known as Bodo Dettke, is a Solomon Islands politician.

His political career began when he was elected to Parliament as MP for North West Guadalcanal in the August 2010 general election. He was appointed Ministry for Forestry in Prime Minister Danny Philip's Cabinet. On 30 November, however, he was sacked over allegations of misconduct; Dettke had ordered the seizure of a ship's cargo of round logs for allegedly "personal reasons", linked to his own ownership of a logging company. On the same day, Fisheries Minister Jimmy Lusibaea lost his position in Cabinet upon losing his parliamentary seat due to being sentenced to two years and nine months in jail for assault and grievous bodily harm. The loss of both ministers brought the Philip government's parliamentary support down to twenty-four MPs, just one ahead of Steve Abana's opposition. The Kolombangara Island Biodiversity Conservation Association (KIBCA) welcomed the sacking, noting that Dettke's logging company, Success Company, had attempted to carry out logging on protected land on Kolombangara island, before KIBCA successfully obtained a court injunction to prevent a violation of environmental laws. For his part, Dettke suggested "Malaysian loggers in the Solomons Forest Association (SFA) [had] pressured [Philip] to sack him as he was a threat to them in the logging industry".

A few days later, however, Dettke was reinstated in Cabinet, and accepted the Ministry of Fisheries left vacant by Lusibaea.

In January 2011, Dettke was one of several government ministers to resign and join the Opposition, expressing hopes of forcing Prime Minister Philip to resign.

A few days after joining the opposition, he claimed to have been shot at in Honiara, at night, along with Douglas Ete (a fellow MP who had also left the government) and said he had been "targeted for having left the government". The police investigated the incident, but claimed Ete and Dettke had not been present at the scene of the shooting, and had therefore not been shot at. The police then released a media statement describing Dettke and Ete's claim as "incorrect and misleading".
