= Central Honiara constituency =

Central Honiara
- Single-member constituency for the National Parliament of the Solomon Islands
- Region: Capital Territory

Current constituency
- Created: 1997
- Current MP: John Moffat Fugui
- Party: Independent

Central Honiara is a single-member constituency of the National Parliament of Solomon Islands. Established in 1997 when the Parliament was increased in size from 47 to 50 seats, it is located in the capital city Honiara.

== List of MPs ==
Election	MP	Party
1997	Moon Pin Kwan	
2001	Meshach Maebiru Maetoloa	
2006	Nelson Ne'e	
2010	John Moffat Fugui	Direct Development Party
2014	John Moffat Fugui	Independent
2019	John Moffat Fugui	Independent
2020 by-election	Alfred Efona	United Party
2024	Gordon Darcy Lilo	Party for Rural Advancement

== Election results ==
=== 2024 ===
2024 general election
Candidate	Party	Votes	%
Gordon Darcy Lilo	SIP	0	0.00
Alfred Efona	UP	0	0.00
Francis Idu	OUR	669	60.11
Afulia Billy	PFP	321	28.84
Nelson Kile	PAP	46	4.13
Annie Anilabata	People's Liberal Democratic Party	42	3.77
Eddie Hoasi	Independent	15	1.35
Noli Dawea	Independent	13	1.17
Alick Collin	Independent	7	0.63
Total		1,113	100.00
Valid votes		1,113	95.29
Invalid/blank votes		55	4.71
Total votes		1,168	100.00
Registered voters/turnout		18,159	6.43

=== 2019 ===
2019 general election
Candidate	Party	Votes	%
John Moffat Fugui	United Democratic Party	4,028	33.74
Alfred Efona	Independent	2,940	24.63
Frank Aote'e	People First Party	2,349	19.68
Joseph Douglas	Independent	814	6.82
Hendry Ologa Oloben	Independent	750	6.28
Julie Gegeu Haro	Solomon Islands United Party	300	2.51
Moon Pin Quan	Independent	203	1.70
Eric Moses Tema	Independent	147	1.23
Billy Mae	Independent	126	1.06
Sam Alasia	PAP	92	0.77
Edward Ronia	New Nation Party	65	0.54
Johnny Maetia	Independent	51	0.43
Gary Faaitoa	Independent	27	0.23
Rose Anilabata	Independent	26	0.22
Cathrine Adifaka	Independent	11	0.09
Percy Elima	National Transformation Party	9	0.08
Total		11,938	100.00
Valid votes		11,938	99.77
Invalid/blank votes		28	0.23
Total votes		11,966	100.00
Registered voters/turnout		15,986	74.85
Source: Election Passport

=== 2014 ===
2014 general election
Candidate	Party	Votes	%
John Moffat Fugui	Independent	2,897	25.22
Frank Aote'e	People First Party	1,765	15.36
Jonathan Aqarao Zama	Youth Owned Rural and Urban Party	1,742	15.16
Vika Lusibaea	Independent	1,286	11.19
Eric Tema	Independent	1,057	9.20
Mark Ronald Tonowane	Independent	466	4.06
Fred Peter	Solomon Islands Party for Rural Advancement	444	3.86
George Mamimu	National Transformation Party	348	3.03
Jack Igi	Pan-Melanesian Congress Party	911	7.93
Francis Idu	United Democratic Party	447	3.89
Tilaila Nilkapp Buarafi	Independent	74	0.64
Hilda Kari	People's Alliance Party	51	0.44
Total		11,488	100.00
Valid votes		11,488	99.15
Invalid/blank votes		98	0.85
Total votes		11,586	100.00
Source: Election Passport

=== 2010 ===
2010 general election
Candidate	Party	Votes	%
John Moffat Fugui	Direct Development Party	1,240	14.95
Jonathan Aqarao Zama	Independent	938	11.31
Fred Peter	Ownership, Unity and Responsibility Party	893	10.76
Francis Waleanisia	Independent	658	7.93
Nelson Ne'e	Independent	496	5.98
Robert Hite	Independent	442	5.33
Martin Alufurai	Independent	439	5.29
Barnabas Henson	Independent	391	4.71
Steve Lebaro	Independent	354	4.27
Samson Saokwai Raete'e	Independent	321	3.87
Moon Pin Kwan	Independent	315	3.80
Lawrence Makili	Independent	315	3.80
John Buluwale	Independent	236	2.84
Michael Tom Anita	Independent	209	2.52
James Leonard Mua	Independent	208	2.51
Eric Tema	Independent	172	2.07
Delmah Lavina Nori	Independent	136	1.64
Ishmael Idu Misalo	Independent	104	1.25
Eddie Kasute'e Siapu Rarabae	Independent	100	1.21
Charles Matanani	Independent	90	1.08
Duddley Wate	Independent	87	1.05
Bernard Bakote'e	Independent	80	0.96
Beato Apaniai	Independent	73	0.88
Total		8,297	100.00
Valid votes		8,297	99.66
Invalid/blank votes		28	0.34
Total votes		8,325	100.00
Registered voters/turnout		37,885	21.97
Source: Election Passport

=== 2006 ===
2006 general election
Candidate	Votes	%
Nelson Ne'e	1,644	25.58
John Moffat Fugui	1,283	19.96
Meshach Maebiru Maetoloa	1,095	17.04
Wayne Maepio	627	9.76
Delmah Lavina Nori	535	8.32
Moon Pin Kwan	447	6.96
Josephine Teakeni	352	5.48
Geoffrey Alacky	292	4.54
Eric Kwalai	44	0.68
Quinzy Darcy	32	0.50
Simone Geatavem Lifa	28	0.44
John Geoffrey Kevisi	27	0.42
Miriam Garo	21	0.33
Total	6,427	100.00
Valid votes	6,427	98.80
Invalid/blank votes	78	1.20
Total votes	6,505	100.00
Registered voters/turnout	19,539	33.29
Source: Election Passport

=== 2001 ===
2001 general election
Candidate	Votes	%
Meshach Maebiru Maetoloa	1,025	26.99
John Moffat Fugui	906	23.85
Moon Pin Kwan	824	21.70
Robert Lulumani	485	12.77
Catherine Adifaka	293	7.71
Robert Wales Feraltelia	142	3.74
Paul B. Garo	99	2.61
Ben Gale	24	0.63
Total	3,798	100.00
Registered voters/turnout	12,551	–
Source: Election Passport

=== 1997 ===
1997 general election
Candidate	Votes	%
Moon Pin Kwan	625	16.34
Walton Willy Abuito'o	443	11.58
Ronnie To'ofilu	428	11.19
Sam Iro	372	9.73
Alex Rukia	287	7.51
Alfred Aofia	279	7.30
Billy Gizo Saenamua	229	5.99
Martin Alufurai	223	5.83
Henry G. Laufunua	207	5.41
Harold Maomatekwa	157	4.11
Stephen Walter Misiosi	142	3.71
Clement Waiwori	126	3.29
Tina Wawane	115	3.01
Henry Ifui	109	2.85
Ben Gale	44	1.15
Catherine Adifaka	26	0.68
Edwin Sitori Nanau	10	0.26
Charles Fox	2	0.05
Total	3,824	100.00
Registered voters/turnout	10,916	–
Source: Election Passport
