= Rexon Annex Ramofafia =

Rexon Ramofafia
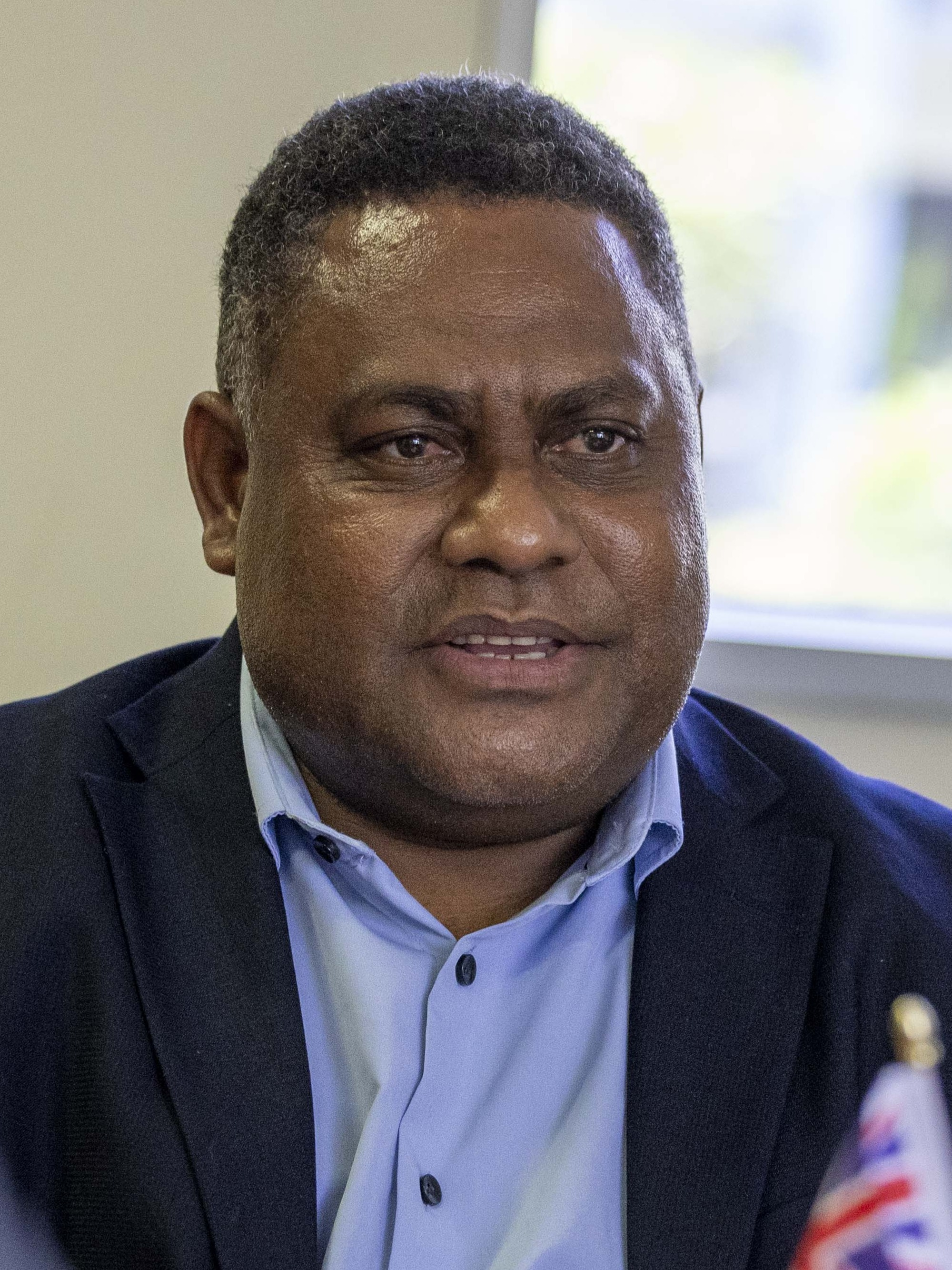
- Ramofafia in 2024

Minister of National Planning and Development Coordination
- Incumbent
- Assumed office 25 September 2019

Rexon Annex Ramofafia is a Solomon Islands Member of Parliament (MP) who currently serves as the Minister for National Planning and Development Coordination (MNPDC). He has held senior positions within Solomon Islands government and is the current MP for Fataleka Constituency.

== Early life and education ==
Ramofafia attended the University of South Pacific.

== Political career ==
Before his political career Ramofafia served as a Policy Analyst at the Ministry of Finance and Treasury.

He was first elected to Parliament in 2019 as the MP for Fataleka constituency in Malaita Province. He was subsequently appointed as Minister for MNPDC in September 2019.

In the April 2024 national election, Ramofafia won a landslide victory and was again elected as MP for Fataleka.
