= Jully Makini =

Jully Makini (also known as Jully Sipolo; born c. 1953) is a Solomon Islander poet, writer and women's rights activist. The author of poems such as Civilized Girl (1981) and Praying Parents (1986), in June 2017 she received the International Women of Courage Award from the US Secretary of State for her work in promoting women's rights in the Solomon Islands.

== Career ==
A native of Gizo in Western Province, and graduate of the University of the South Pacific, she began a career in writing after attending the Solomon Island Women Writers' Workshop in 1980. The following year she published the poem Civilized Girl, which is a light-hearted critique of women becoming westernized in the islands. In 1983, as an editor with the University of the South Pacific Solomon Islands Centre, she was involved in publishing the first anthology of women's works ever published in the islands, Mi Mere. In 1986 she published the poem Praying Parents, and later in 2007 she authored Flotsam and Jetsam.

Makini is noted for her work in advocating women's rights in the Solomon Islands, a country where violence against women is still a taboo issue to discuss in society. She has used her writing work to convey her message to people in remote areas. In the capital of Honiara she has taken an active role in leading various women's groups and promoting sustainable development. She moved back to Gizo in 2008, where she has helped establish the Gizo Family Support Centre, a local NGO, with UN Women Ending Violence Against Women (EVAW) Pacific Fund funding. In June 2017 she received the International Women of Courage Award from the US Secretary of State for her work in activism, and she has been cited as one of "70 Inspiring Pacific Women" by Pacific Community.

== Works ==
as Jully Sipolo

- Civilized girl: poems . Suva, Fiji: South Pacific Creative Arts Society, 1981.
- (ed. with Afu Billy and Hazel Lulei) Mi mere: poetry and prose by Solomon Island women writers. Honiara: University of the South Pacific, Solomon Islands Centre, 1983.
- Praying parents: a second collection of poems. Honiara, Solomon Islands: Aruligo Book Centre, 1986.

as Jully Makini

- (ed.) Na buka vivinei malivi pa zinama roviana (Roviana custom stories book). Solomon Islands : Western Province Government, 1991.
- Flotsam & jetsam: a third collection of poems. Suva, Fiji: IPS Publications, University of the South Pacific, 2007.
- Cartes postales des îles Salomon. Rochefort: Les Petites allées, 2019.
