= East Malaita constituency =

Constituency of the Solomon Islands Parliament

East Malaita
- Single-member constituency for the National Parliament of the Solomon Islands
- Region: Malaita Province

Current constituency
- Created: 1973; 1997
- Current MP: Manasseh Maelanga
- Party: People's Alliance Party

East Malaita is a single-member constituency of the National Parliament of Solomon Islands. Located on the island of Malaita, it was established in 1973 when the Governing Council was expanded from 17 to 24 seats. It was abolished in 1993 when Parliament was expanded from 38 to 47 seats, but re-established in 1997 when a further three seats were added. Alfred Maetia, who served as MP for East Malaita between 1980 and 1993, was elected in Central Kwara'ae in the 1993 elections, but returned to contest the East Malaita seat in 1997.

== List of MPs ==
Term	MP	Party
1973–1976	Leslie Fugui	
1976–1980	Faneta Sira	
1980–1984	Alfred Maetia	
1984–1989	Alfred Maetia	
1989–1993	Alfred Maetia	
1993–1997	Ceased to exist	
1997–2001	Alfred Maetia	
2001–2006	Joses Wawari Sanga	
2006–2010	Joses Wawari Sanga	
2006–2010	Manasseh Maelanga	
2010–2014	Manasseh Maelanga	Democratic Party
2014–2019	Manasseh Maelanga	Independent
2019–	Manasseh Maelanga	People's Alliance Party

== Election results ==
=== 2019 ===
2019 general election
Candidate	Party	Votes
Manaseh Maelanga	People's Alliance Party	2,966
William Baefua	United Party	1,247
Roy Jahdiel Funu	New Nation Party	528
Evan Gerea	Democratic Alliance Party	258
Finley Fiumae	Independent	220
Invalid/blank votes		55
Total		5,274
Registered voters		6,121
Source: Solomon Islands Electoral Commission

=== 2014 ===
2014 general election
Candidate	Party	Votes
Manasseh Maelanga		2,992
Jimson Iakwai	Pan-Melanesian Congress	896
Rex Alafa	United Democratic Party	501
Paul Ofea		185
Michael Lautagi	People's Alliance Party	109
Eddie Misitee Leanafaka	Kadare Party	70
Leonard Solomon Saii		48
Invalid/blank votes		11
Total		
Registered voters		
Source: Election Passport

=== 2010 ===
2010 general election
Candidate	Party	Votes
Manasseh Maelanga	Democratic Party	2,845
Lloyd Gwee Toribaeko		465
David Toifai Misitomu		285
Wilfred Bello Faari		125
Ezekiel Korai		123
Philistus Olo Fafoi		70
Sade Oge		64
Invalid/blank votes		28
Total		4,005
Registered voters		8,231
Source: Election Passport

=== 2008 ===
2008 by-election
Candidate	Party	Votes
Manasseh Maelanga		1,106
David Toifai Misitomu		748
Taeasi Sanga		678
Alfred Maetia		642
Chris Maebiru		346
Tony Maega'asia		260
Billy Fa'arobo		218
Elwyn Maetia Rea		216
David Ganifiri		199
David Mani Manusau		155
Wilfred Bello Faari		25
Invalid/blank votes		
Total		4,593
Registered voters		
Source: Election Passport

=== 2006 ===
2006 general election
Candidate	Party	Votes
Joses Wawari Sanga		1,601
Afu Lia Billy		738
Alfred Maetia		583
Chris Maebiru		254
Nation Sia Saelea		178
Robert Nathan Mautai		119
Eddie Misitee Leanafaka		6
Invalid/blank votes		57
Total		3,536
Registered voters		6,379
Source: Election Passport

=== 2001 ===
2001 general election
Candidate	Party	Votes
Joses Wawari Sanga		701
Afu Lia Billy		699
Robert Nathan Mautai		559
Alfred Maetia		460
Robert Belo Mafane		338
Benedic Udu		229
John Rockson Tamofaolu		227
Samson Kwasi		201
Wilson Kafo Mamau		167
Alfred Aofia		96
Invalid/blank votes		
Total		3,677
Registered voters		5,834
Source: Election Passport

=== 1997 ===
1997 general election
Candidate	Party	Votes
Alfred Maetia		360
John Wesley Alasina		311
John Alick Sam Lota		240
Billy Fa'arobo		208
Thomas Atoa Leabulu		176
John Maetia Kaliuae		166
Robert Belo Mafane		123
Wilfred Bello Faari		81
Azriel Alafa		36
Rocky Tisa Sugumanu		35
Frank Manioli		22
Invalid/blank votes		
Total		1,758
Registered voters		3,010
Source: Election Passport

=== 1989 ===
1989 general election
Candidate	Party	Votes
Alfred Maetia		648
John Moffat Fugui		358
Shemuel Siau		349
Andrew Buga		270
William Gua		229
Daniel Lulutaloa		123
Stephen Anilafa Sipolo		118
Michael Peter Ramosae		105
Kwasi Daurara		64
Martin Ma'akalo		43
Invalid/blank votes		
Total		2,307
Registered voters		4,037
Source: Election Passport

=== 1984 ===
1984 general election
Candidate	Party	Votes
Alfred Maetia		821
Billy Fa'arobo		302
John M. Ramoni		222
Nemuel Misitana		127
Ariel Fa'amae		117
Alick Samo		104
Michael Foutaenu		104
Blake Afuga		94
Jezrel Luitamo Kii		39
Billy Abana		34
Thomas Siau		17
Invalid/blank votes		
Total		1,981
Registered voters		
Source: Election Passport

=== 1980 ===
1980 general election
Candidate	Party	Votes
Alfred Maetia		578
Faneta Sira		331
Billy Fa'arobo		282
Andrew Buga		127
J. Waita		124
Blake Afuga		123
E. Lade		110
S. Dolaiasi		104
M. Sanga		88
L. Lomo		48
R. Tisah		12
Invalid/blank votes		
Total		1,927
Registered voters		3,394
Source: Election Passport

=== 1976 ===
1976 general election
Candidate	Party	Votes
Faneta Sira		238
John Maetia Kaliuae		201
Leslie Fugui		168
Ben Gale		157
Appallosi Siosi		127
Jack Inifiri		107
Saeti Saefafia		85
Charles Luiramo		67
Billy Fa'arobo		62
Barnabas Kona		49
Invalid/blank votes		
Total		1,261
Registered voters		
Source: Election Passport

=== 1973 ===
1973 general election
Candidate	Party	Votes
Leslie Fugui		441
Faneta Sira		338
Billy Fa'arobo		205
John Maetia Kaliuae		188
Baddeley Koutu		111
Ben Gale		97
Andrew Gwai		88
Pita Saefafia Kirimaoma		87
Jack Inifiri		67
Invalid/blank votes		
Total		1,622
Registered voters		
Source: Election Passport
