= Cuba–Solomon Islands relations =

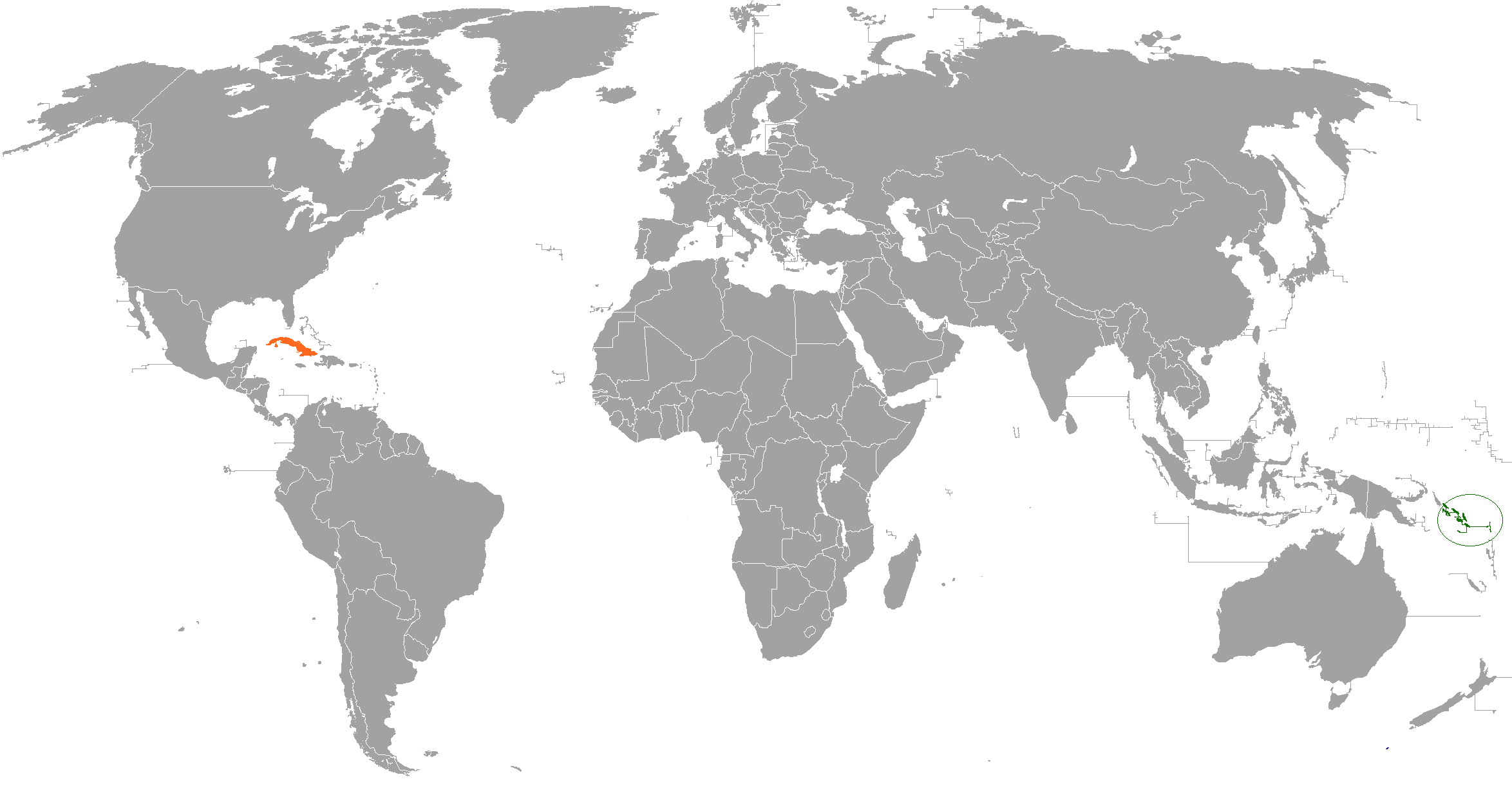

- Solomon Islands: Cuba

Relations between Solomon Islands and the Republic of Cuba have only a short history. The two countries moved to establish relations from the 2000s, and particularly from 2007, within the context of Cuba's growing interest in the Pacific Islands region. Like other countries in Oceania, Solomon Islands is a beneficiary of Cuban medical aid; bilateral relations must be viewed within the scope of Cuba's regional policy in Oceania. Cuba has a non-resident ambassador in Suva. Solomon Islands has an embassy in Havana.

== History ==
In September 2007, it was announced that 40 Cuban doctors would be sent to Solomon Islands. Solomons’ Minister of Foreign Affairs Patterson Oti said that Solomon Islander doctors would "learn from their Cuban colleagues in specialized areas". He added that such relations had been "on the drawing board between Solomon Islands and Cuba since 2000". In addition to providing doctors, Cuba provided scholarships for 50 Solomon Islanders to study medicine in Cuba for free. According to a spokesman for Solomon Islands' Ministry of Health, the Solomons are "desperately in need" of doctors, and hence grateful to Cuba for its "much needed assistance".

In September 2008, Solomons' Foreign Minister William Haomae attended a multilateral Cuba-Pacific summit in Havana, during which participants discussed "strengthening co-operation in health, sports and education". Cuban authorities declared themselves particularly sensitive to Pacific Island countries' struggles in facing the effects of climate change, and confirmed their intention to assist in whatever way they could.

In April 2011, the Solomon Islands announced they would be opening an embassy in Cuba. In March 2013, Solomon Islands Ambassador Simeon Bouro became the first resident ambassador for any Pacific Island country in Cuba. Bouro assured Cuba that the Solomons would "support for Cuba at the United Nations", and expressed the hope that bilateral cooperation would expand "to include sports, engineering, tourism, and agriculture and disaster management - areas [in which Cuba had] vast experience" which the Solomons could benefit from. At that time, there were 98 Solomon Islanders studying medicine in Cuba, and the Cuban government announced it would provide 104 scholarships for Solomon Islands medical students the following year.

== See also ==
- Foreign relations of Cuba
- Foreign relations of Solomon Islands
