= Baegu/Asifola constituency =

Constituency of the Solomon Islands Parliament

Baegu/Asifola
- Single-member constituency for the National Parliament of the Solomon Islands
- Region: Malaita Province

Current constituency
- Created: 1993
- Current MP: Makario Tagini
- Party: Ownership, Unity and Responsibility Party

Baegu/Asifola is a single-member constituency of the National Parliament of Solomon Islands. Created in 1993 when Parliament was expanded from 38 to 47 seats, it is located on the island of Malaita.

== List of MPs ==
Term	MP	Party
1993–1997	Walter Folotalu	
1997–2001	Steve Aumanu	
2001–2006	Steve Aumanu	
2006–2010	Toswel Kaua	
2010–2014	Toswel Kaua	
2010–2014	David Tome	
2014–2019	David Tome	Independent
2019–2024	Makario Tagini	United Democratic Party
2024–	Makario Tagini	Ownership, Unity and Responsibility Party

== Election results ==
=== 2024 ===
2024 general election
Candidate	Party	Votes
Makario Tagini	OUR	2,391
Celsus Talifilu	U4C	2,147
Douglas Burga	UP	1,009
Lionel Kakai	Independent	513
Kouto Macau	Independent	334
Invalid/blank votes		13
Total		6,407
Registered voters		9,151

=== 2019 ===
2019 general election
Candidate	Party	Votes
Makario Tagini	UDP	3,028
David Tome	PAP	2,572
Robert Iroga	UP	1,785
Gabriel Suri	SID	1,685
George Suri	Independent	470
Elijah Asilaua	Independent	9
Invalid/blank votes		38
Total		9,549
Registered voters		10,943

=== 2014 ===
2014 general election
Candidate	Party	Votes
David Tome	Independent	1,904
Tagini Makario	Independent	1,759
Henry Ologa Olobeni	Independent	1,394
Vincent Lyumann Fiuta	Independent	136
Peter Falimae	Independent	47
John Anthony Wate	People First Party	36
George Edward Osifelo	National Transformation Party	19
Silas Fakani	Independent	11
Augustine Diau Taenao	Pan Melanesian Congress Party	9
Invalid/blank votes		58
Total		
Registered voters		
Source: Election Passport

=== 2011 ===
2011 by-election
Candidate	Party	Votes
David Tome	Independent	1,366
Henry Ologa Olobeni	Independent	1,117
Tagini Makario	Independent	1,048
Siau Mana	Independent	855
Martin Saefafia	Independent	521
Edgar Maoma Kaua	Independent	512
Duddley Wate	Independent	411
James Kili	Independent	177
Robert Dolaiasi Kaua	Independent	177
Frederick Waiti	Independent	118
John Maga Falasi	Independent	34
Timothy Amao	Independent	29
Duddley Iasuri	Independent	16
Invalid/blank votes		28
Total		6,409
Registered voters		10,173
Source: Election Passport

=== 2010 ===
2010 general election
Candidate	Party	Votes
Toswel Kaua	Independent	1,037
David Tome	Independent	714
Siau Mana	Independent	647
Henry Ologa Olobeni	Independent	466
Tagini Makario	Independent	377
James Kili	Independent	374
Thompson Lebeoa	Independent	196
Peter Kakai (Jnr)	Independent	167
Francis Frank Lomo	Independent	126
Wilfred Akao	Independent	88
John Tatalo	Independent	87
Bobby Kusilifu	Independent	68
Alfred Liata Malakai	Independent	37
Tony Irobina	Independent	0
Invalid/blank votes		206
Total		4,590
Registered voters		10,173
Source: Election Passport

=== 2006 ===
2006 general election
Candidate	Party	Votes
Toswel Kaua		1,758
Steve Aumanu		913
Walter Folotalu		688
Cornelius Keteau		475
George Suri Laufanua		350
Catherine Adifaka		21
Invalid/blank votes		
Total		4,205
Registered voters		6,975
Source: Election Passport

=== 2001 ===
2001 general election
Candidate	Party	Votes
Steve Aumanu		1,273
Gabriel K Suri		790
Joseph Ofotalau		595
Jasper Tagani Anisi		463
Daniel Aba		439
George Suri Kwanae		110
Invalid/blank votes		
Total		3,670
Registered voters		6,279
Source: Election Passport

=== 1997 ===
1997 general election
Candidate	Party	Votes
Steve Aumanu		602
Jasper Tagani Anisi		469
Nathan Wate		467
Walter Folotalu		452
Steward Maearo		343
Baddley Anita		249
George Ashly Kakaluale		17
Invalid/blank votes		
Total		2,599
Registered voters		3,952
Source: Election Passport

=== 1993 ===
1993 general election
Candidate	Party	Votes
Walter Folotalu		332
Anthony Water		254
Selwyn Suri		198
Ben Misiga		180
Leberio Idufanua		169
James Iroga		165
Charles Oge		151
Daniel Aba		149
Charles Fox Akao		120
Seti Faefafia		68
Jack Inifiri		47
Richard Taloga		44
Jeriel Faiga		4
Joseph Tutu		2
Invalid/blank votes		
Total		1,883
Registered voters		3,436
Source: Election Passport
