= Moses Garu =

Solomon Islands politician (born 1969)

The Right Honourable Moses Garu MP

Minister for Mines, Energy and Rural Electrification
- In office 21 November 2011 – 8 September 2014
- Prime Minister: Gordon Darcy Lilo
- Preceded by: himself (prior to resignation)
- Succeeded by: Samson Maneka

Minister for Mines, Energy and Rural Electrification
- In office 18 April 2011 – 9 November 2011
- Prime Minister: Danny Philip
- Preceded by: Mark Kemakeza
- Succeeded by: himself (after 12-day vacancy)

Member of Parliament for West Guadalcanal
- In office 4 August 2010 – 13 February 2025
- Preceded by: Laurie Chan

Personal details
- Born: 1 December 1969
- Died: 10 February 2025 (age 56)
- Party: Democratic Party

Moses Garu (born December 1, 1969 – February 10, 2025) was a Solomon Islands politician. He was born in Isunavutu, West Guadalcanal, Guadalcanal Province.

With diplomas in tropical agriculture and in secondary teaching, he has worked in public service, as a school teacher, and in banking. He was a bank manager at the time of the severe ethnic conflicts on Guadalcanal and Malaita in the early 2000s. In May 2000, he was attacked by members of the Malaita Eagle Force with machetes and axes. They allegedly attempted to behead him, leaving him with a permanent "puckered scar on his right jaw running on down his neck". Jimmy "Rasta" Lusibaea, one of the leaders of the Eagle Force, was among those charged with attempting to murder Garu, but charges were dropped when "witnesses failed to testify".

Garu's political career began when he was elected MP for West Guadalcanal in the August 2010 general election, representing the Democratic Party. Lusibaea was also elected to Parliament for the first time in that election, as an Independent, resulting in the two men sitting across from each other in the assembly. They "spoke at length" after the election, and were reported to have "put their past to rest", with Garu expressing no resentment over what had happened during the conflicts.

With the Democratic Party becoming the main Opposition party, Garu was appointed Shadow Minister for Rural Development and Indigenous Affairs in Opposition Leader Steve Abana's Shadow Cabinet. In February 2011, however, he and two other Opposition members defected to Prime Minister Danny Philip's government majority, stating that they wished to help pass the budget and defend the interests of their respective constituencies. On April 18, he was appointed Minister for Mines, Energy and Rural Electrification.

On November 9, 2011, he resigned and rejoined the Opposition, as part of a mass defection which brought down the Philip government two days later. Gordon Darcy Lilo replaced Philip as Prime Minister on November 16, and reappointed Garu to his previous position five days later.
