= Bernard Ghiro =

Solomon Islands politician (born 1960)

Bernard Ghiro (born August 28, 1960) is a Solomon Islands politician and a former member of the National Parliament of the Solomon Islands.

== Political career ==
Ghiro became active in national politics when he contested the Central Makira constituency in the 2001 general elections. He was elected after defeating the incumbent MP Japhet Waipora. He was re-elected in the 2006 elections, but was defeated by Hypolite Taremae in the 2010 elections. In the 2014 elections he ran in the East Honiara constituency, but failed to be elected.
