= Morris Toiraena =

Minister of Health and Medical Services
- Incumbent
- Assumed office May 2026

Morris Toiraena is the current Minister for Health and Medical Services in Solomon Islands. He has held several senior positions within Solomon Islands government as Deputy Speaker, Chair of the Parliamentary Health Committee and is the current Member of Parliament for East Honiara constituency.

== Career ==
Early in his career Toiraena worked as a National Training Unit Officer in Papua New Guinea.

In April 2024, he was elected to the East Honiara constituency in the Solomon Islands General Election. He later served as the Chair of the Parliamentary Health Committee.

In May 2025, he was elected unopposed as the new Deputy Speaker of the National Parliament of Solomon Islands.

In May 2026, Toiraena was sworn in as Minister for Health and Medical Services.
