= 2008 Aoke/Langalanga by-election =

The Aoke-Langalanga by-election, 2008 was a by-election for the Aoke-Langalanga constituency in the National Parliament of Solomon Islands. It was held following the death of sitting MP (and former Prime Minister) Bartholomew Ulufa'alu, of the Liberal Party.

Ten candidates (nine men and one woman) stood for the by-election, which was held on March 28, 2008.

Matthew Cooper Wale, of the Democratic Party, obtained 1,608 votes, while Billy Manu, in second place, "polled a little over 1000 ballots". Voter turn-out was about 70%.

== Results ==
Candidate	Votes	%
Matthew Wale	1,608	30.10
Billy A. Manu	1,022	19.13
David Faradatolo	937	17.54
Hellen Osi Huniehu	672	12.58
Billy Gizo Saenamua	454	8.50
Peter Clyde Mamisau	311	5.82
Abraham Willie Waleualo	214	4.01
Meshach Maebiru Maetoloa	63	1.18
Robert Wales Feraltelia	51	0.95
Robert Henry Alufurai	11	0.21
Total	5,343	100.00
Valid votes	5,343	99.26
Invalid/blank votes	40	0.74
Total votes	5,383	100.00

== See also ==
- List of Solomon Islands by-elections
