= Japhet Waipora =

Solomon Islands politician (born 1943)

Japhet Waipora (born 24 June 1943) is a Solomon Islands politician and former member of the National Parliament of the Solomon Islands.

== Political career ==
Waipora ran for election to the National Parliament in the 1993 general elections in the Central Makira constituency, finishing in third place. He won the seat in the 1997 elections, unseating the incumbent MP Benedict Kinika, but was unseated himself in the 2001 elections, finishing third and losing to Bernard Ghiro.

In the 2006 general elections he stood in the West Makira constituency, defeating the incumbent MP Mathias Taro as he was returned to Parliament. He lost his seat to Dick Ha'amori in the 2010 elections.

In May 2013 he was convicted for having misused about SI$ 150,000 "that had been earmarked for his constituency in 2008 and 2009".
