= Nelson Ne'e =

Solomon Islands politician (1954–2013)

Nelson Ne'e (February 2, 1954 – c. March 13, 2013) was a Solomon Islands politician.

Ne'e was born in Ambu, Malaita Province. After studying at the Institute of Administration in Sydney and at the National Institute of Public Administration in Malaysia, he worked in administration for the Solomon Islands Electricity Authority, eventually becoming its Deputy General Manager, before going into politics. He first entered the National Parliament when he was elected MP for the Central Honiara constituency in the country's capital in the April 2006 general election. He sat as an independent.

In May 2006, following riots which forced Prime Minister Snyder Rini to resign, new Prime Minister Manasseh Sogavare appointed Ne'e as Minister for Tourism and Culture. At the time of his appointment, Ne'e had recently been arrested, by "Australian and local police" acting within the Regional Assistance Mission to Solomon Islands (RAMSI), whereby Australia and other Pacific countries provided essential services to the country after the inter-ethnic violence from 1999 to 2003. He was charged with having participated in the earlier riots which had led to the fall of the Rini government. He was released after several months, reportedly on medical grounds, but did not retain his position in government after June; Sogavare "was forced to replace [him] after a backlash from local church and community leaders, as well as foreign aid donors". Ne'e remained in gaol during the entirety of his hypothetical time as government minister. The charges were eventually dropped, for lack of evidence. A Cabinet leak, however, alleged that Sogavare had exerted influence to have the charges against Ne'e called off. In 2011, Ne'e sued for malicious prosecution, alleging that the charges against him had been politically motivated, instigated by Australian police due to his "anti-RAMSI views". His case was delayed when his barrister was convicted of criminal conversion. The case was ongoing as of early 2012; there is no accessible record of it having ultimately been decided.

On 5 December 2007, Sogavare appointed Ne'e as Minister for Home Affairs. The appointment was short-lived; the Sogavare government was brought down by a motion of no confidence on 20 December.

Ne'e was a single term MP, and did not retain his seat in the August 2010 general election.

Ne'e died circa March 13, 2013, at the age of 59, "after suffering a long illness".
