= Makario Tagini =

Solomon Islands politician

The Right Honourable Makario Tagini MP

Minister of Forestry and Research
- Incumbent
- Assumed office 4 May 2024
- Prime Minister: Jeremiah Manele
- Preceded by: Dickson Mua

Minister for Public Service
- In office 25 March 2021 – 31 Dec 2023
- Preceded by: Frederick Kologeto
- Succeeded by: Francis Sade

Minister of Justice and Legal Affairs
- In office 25 Sep 2019 – 25 March 2021
- Prime Minister: Manasseh Sogavare
- Preceded by: Dr. Tautai Kaitu’u Angikimua
- Succeeded by: Clezy Rore

Personal details
- Born: 1968 (age 57–58)
- Party: OUR Party (since 2019)

Makario Tagini is a Solomon Islands politician who is member of Parliament for Baegu/Asifola.

Tagini was an unsuccessful candidate in the 2008 East Honiara by-election and the 2011 Baegu/Asifola by-election.

In the 2019 Solomon Islands general election, he was elected for the United Democratic Party.

In 2019, he was appointed Minister of Justice and Legal Affairs. In 2021, he became Minister of Public Service.

In the 2024 Solomon Islands general election, he was elected for the Ownership, Unity and Responsibility Party. Following the election he was appointed to the Cabinet of Solomon Islands as Minister of Forestry and Research.
