= John Dean Kuku =

Solomon Islands politician

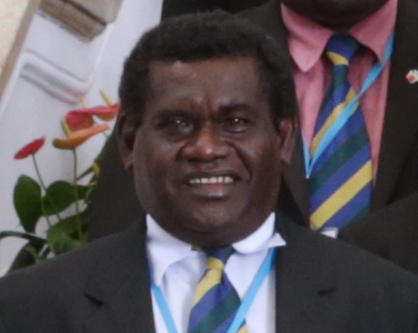
- John Dean Kuku poses for an official photo as part of the delegation led by Solomon Islands Prime Minister Manasseh Sogavare (26 September 2017) in Taipei, Taiwan

Minister of Public Service
- In office 15 December 2014 – 4 August 2017

Minister of Education and Human Resources Development
- Incumbent
- Assumed office 4 August 2017

John Dean Kuku (born 1963) is a politician of Solomon Islands who served as Minister of Public Service (from 15 December 2014 to 4 August 2017) and has been Minister of Education and Human Resources Development since 4 August 2017.
