= Siriako Usa =

Solomon Islands politician (born 1959)

Siriako Usa (born 21 August 1959) is a Solomon Islands politician. He is a member of the National Parliament of the Solomon Islands representing the North West Guadalcanal Constituency. He was first elected on 5 December 2001 and was re-elected on 5 April 2006. He served as Minister for Lands and Survey in the Kemakeza government (2001–06) and then as Minister for Mines and Minerals in the Sogavare government (2006–07).
