= Bulolo Forestry College =

University in Papua New Guinea

The Bulolo Forestry College is a university located in Bulolo, Papua New Guinea. The university is a campus of the Papua New Guinea University of Technology. It specializes in the forestry industry. At Bulolu, there is a 10,000 hectare plantation as well as a sawmill.

== See also ==
- List of forestry universities and colleges
