= Central Makira constituency =

Central Makira
- Single-member constituency for the National Parliament of the Solomon Islands
- Region: Makira Province

Current constituency
- Created: 1993
- Current MP: Nestor Ghiro
- Party: Independent

Central Makira is a single-member constituency of the National Parliament of Solomon Islands. Created in 1993 when Parliament was expanded from 38 to 47 seats, it is located on the island of Makira.

== List of MPs ==
Election	MP	Party
1993	Benedict Kinika	
1997	Japhet Waipora	
2001	Bernard Ghiro	
2006	Bernard Ghiro	
2010	Hypolite Taremae	
2014	Nestor Ghiro	Independent
2019	Nestor Ghiro	Independent
2024	Nestor Ghiro	OUR Party

== Election results ==
=== 2019 ===
2019 general election
Candidate	Party	Votes
Nestor Ghiro	Independent	3,803
Peter Thompson Usumae	United Democratic Party	1,419
Hypolite Taremae	Independent	152
Casper Muna	Democratic Alliance Party	29
Invalid/blank votes		14
Total		5,417
Registered voters		6,299
Source: Solomon Islands Electoral Commission

=== 2014 ===
2014 general election
Candidate	Party	Votes
Nestor Ghiro	Independent	1,047
Hypolite Taremae	Independent	1,014
Julian Maka'a	Independent	303
Emmanuel Wuriruma Tora	Independent	302
Philip Paikai Apela	Independent	274
Everlyn Kahia	People's Alliance Party	240
Moon Pin Kwan	Independent	210
Jerry Tauni	Independent	107
Noel Daley Mamau	Kadare Party	75
Joseph Tamuatara	Independent	56
Charles Ureie	Independent	55
Gwendolyn Rumu Masuguria	Independent	23
Cecil Meimana	Independent	5
Invalid/blank votes		26
Total		
Registered voters		
Source: Election Passport

=== 2010 ===
2010 general election
Candidate	Party	Votes
Hypolite Taremae	Independent	1,360
Bernard Ghiro	Ownership, Unity and Responsibility Party	817
Nestor Ghiro	Independent	478
Vkey Mansugu	National Party	232
Fredson Fenua	People's Alliance Party	225
Fox Qwaina	Independent	172
Jack Faga	Independent	137
Joseph Tamuatara	Rural Development Party	124
Henry Hagawusia	Independent	122
Paul Watoto	Independent	65
Thomas Nukuafi	Ownership, Unity and Responsibility Party	48
Alfred Wato	Independent	42
Romano Taro	People's Congress Party	31
Edmund Mehare	Independent	25
Aaron Koroa	Independent	8
Nesta Marahora	National Party	121
Invalid/blank votes		19
Total		4,026
Registered voters		5,510
Source: Election Passport

=== 2006 ===
2006 general election
Candidate	Party	Votes
Bernard Ghiro		877
Johnson Taisae Sunaone		443
Clement Kirari		396
George Alfred Kuper		341
Fredson Fenua		292
Allen Ngariniuki Campbell		249
Andrew Mua		170
Gad Hagasuramo		119
Benedict Tahi		112
James Mua Rafe		87
Stanley Waisi Tageahoro		80
Edward Haui		48
Invalid/blank votes		56
Total		3,270
Registered voters		4,722
Source: Election Passport

=== 2001 ===
2001 general election
Candidate	Party	Votes
Bernard Ghiro		643
Reginald Nunu		580
Japhet Waipora		442
Gad Hagasuramo		407
Paul Watoto		383
Fredson Fenua		267
Alfred Wato		88
Ellison Ramo		77
Ishmael Tuki		68
Benedict Kinika		67
Invalid/blank votes		
Total		3,022
Registered voters		4,025
Source: Election Passport

=== 1997 ===
1997 general election
Candidate	Party	Votes
Japhet Waipora		632
Jackson Sunaone		600
Benedict Kinika		402
Reginald Nunu		384
Invalid/blank votes		
Total		2,018
Registered voters		2,560
Source: Election Passport

=== 1993 ===
1993 general election
Candidate	Party	Votes
Benedict Kinika		483
Gad Hagasuramo		441
Japhet Waipora		417
William Dick Waitara		131
Thomson Atu		88
Casper Muna		74
Raymond Mauriasi Ngeripwea		37
William Taisia		33
Invalid/blank votes		
Total		1,704
Registered voters		2,386
Source: Election Passport
