= David Tome =

Solomon Islands politician

The Right Honourable David Tome MP

Minister for Agriculture
- Incumbent
- Assumed office 22 October 2012
- Prime Minister: Gordon Darcy Lilo
- Preceded by: Connelly Sandakabatu

Minister for Police, National Security and Correctional Services
- In office 1 March 2012 – 22 October 2012
- Prime Minister: Gordon Darcy Lilo
- Preceded by: Clay Forau
- Succeeded by: Chris Laore

Minister for Provincial Government
- In office 8 February 2012 – 1 March 2012
- Prime Minister: Gordon Darcy Lilo
- Preceded by: Walter Folatalu
- Succeeded by: Silas Tausinga

Member of Parliament for Baegu/Asifola
- Incumbent
- Assumed office 30 March 2011
- Preceded by: Toswel Kaua

Personal details
- Party: Independent

David Tome is a Solomon Islands politician.

Described as a "former agriculturist turned teacher", he was an independent candidate for the Baegu/Asifola constituency in the August 2010 general election, and finished second of fourteen candidates, with 16.3% of the vote; he was defeated by the incumbent, independent MP Toswel Kaua. Kaua died three months later, and Tome won the resulting by-election in March 2011, with 21.4% of the vote.

On 8 February 2012, Prime Minister Gordon Darcy Lilo appointed him Minister for Provincial Government. (His predecessor, Walter Folatalu, was reshuffled as Minister for Communication and Civil Aviation, replacing Andrew Hanaria who had lost his seat upon being found to have bribed voters.) On 1 March, Tome was reshuffled to the position of Minister for Police, National Security and Correctional Services, left vacant by Clay Forau who had been promoted Minister for Foreign Affairs. On 22 October, Tome was reshuffled to the position of Minister for Agriculture.
