= Charles Dausabea =

Solomon Islands politician (1960–2019)

Charles Dausabea (21 August 1960 – 14 October 2019) was a Solomon Islands politician.

== Early life ==
After studying at the Honiara Technical Institute in the late 1970s, he attended the Police Training School, and then a police academy in Taiwan. In the 1980s, while he was serving in the police, he was "convicted of forgery and receiving stolen goods", and jailed.

== Political career ==
=== Early career ===
Entering politics, he sat on the Honiara Town Council in 1990, then entered the National Parliament as MP for East Honiara in a by-election on 19 December 1990, following the resignation of sitting MP Bartholomew Ulufa'alu. Prime Minister Solomon Mamaloni subsequently appointed him Chief Whip. He lost his seat to John Kauluae in the 1993 general election, but regained it in August 1997. After losing it to Simeon Bouro in the 2001 election, he regained it once more in April 2006.

He was one of the leaders of the Malaita Eagle Force during the inter-ethnic violence in which the country descended into chaos from 1999 to 2003. As such, he "played a key role in the 2000 coup", in which the Eagle Force kidnapped and overthrew Prime Minister Bartholomew Ulufa'alu, accusing him of not sufficiently tending to the interests of the Malaitan community on Guadalcanal.

On 5 May 2006, following riots which forced Prime Minister Snyder Rini to resign, new Prime Minister Manasseh Sogavare appointed Dausabea as Minister for Police and National Security. At the time of his appointment, Dausabea had just been arrested, by "Australian and local police" acting within the Regional Assistance Mission to Solomon Islands (RAMSI), whereby Australia and other Pacific countries provided essential services to the country after the 1999-to-2003 violence. Described by an Australian official as "the most dangerous man in the Solomons", he was charged with having participated in the riots which had led to the fall of the Rini government. On 9 June, Sogavare "was forced to replace [him] after a backlash from local church and community leaders, as well as foreign aid donors". Dausabea remained in jail during the entirety of his hypothetical time as government minister. The charges were eventually dropped, for lack of evidence amid claims of secret witness payments by the Australian Federal Police to secure their conviction. A Cabinet leak, however, alleged that Sogavare had exerted influence to have the charges against him called off.

On 5 December 2007, Sogavare appointed Dausabea as Minister for Public Service. The appointment was short-lived; the Sogavare government was brought down by a motion of no confidence on 20 December.

Dausabea lost his seat again in 2008 after being convicted of fraud and jailed for eighteen months.

In 2012 he became the leader of the Malaita Ma’asina Forum, a movement which campaigns for Malaita Province to obtain full political autonomy in relation to the national government.

== Death ==
He died in October 2019 "after a long illness".
