= Simeon Bouro =

Solomon Islands politician and diplomat (born 1959)

Simeon Bouro (born 25 December 1959) is a Solomon Islands politician and diplomat.

With a Bachelor of Science degree, having majored in Forestry, he worked as Corporate Affairs Manager for Pacific Air Express, and also worked in the diplomatic service before going into politics. He was chief consul officer in the Solomon Islands' consulate general in Brisbane, Australia from 1992 to 1998.

He was first elected to the National Parliament in the 2001 general election, as MP for East Honiara. He sat as a member of the Association of Independent Members of Parliament. Prime Minister Sir Allan Kemakeza appointed him Minister for Communication, Aviation and Meteorology on 4 February 2005. He was dropped from the Cabinet on 20 December, then reintegrated as Minister for Mines and Energy in January 2006. On 16 February, he was reshuffled to the position of Minister for Police, National Security, Justice and Legal Affairs, which he held until the April 2006 general election, in which he lost his seat in Parliament. He unsuccessfully took part in the August 2010 general election.

In March 2013, Simeon Bouro became the first resident Solomon Islands Ambassador in Cuba, and the first resident Ambassador for any Pacific Island country of that nation. On that occasion, Simeon Bouro assured Cuba that the Solomon Islands would provide "support for Cuba at the United Nations", and expressed the hope that bilateral cooperation would expand "to include sports, engineering, tourism, and agriculture and disaster management - areas [in which Cuba had] vast experience" which the Solomon Islands could benefit from. At the time, there were 98 Solomon Islanders studying medicine in Cuba, and the Cuban government announced it would provide 104 scholarships for Solomon Islands medical students the following year.
