= Solomon Islands National Council of Women =

- Formation: 1983
- Founded at: Honiara, Solomon Islands
- Type: Non-governmental organisation
- Purpose: "Women as Equal Partners in the Development of Solomon Islands"

Solomon Islands National Council of Women is a non-governmental women's organisation based in Honiara, in Solomon Islands. It was founded in 1983

It has received funding from the Global Fund for Women

== Purpose ==
The Council was founded to represent women in the Solomon Islands, with a vision of "Women as Equal Partners in the Development of Solomon Islands". It encourages the participation of women in decision-making on the Islands.

== Objectives ==
The objectives of the organisation are as follows:

- Promote and coordinate activities for women throughout Solomon Islands;
- Act as a representative body for women to the Solomon Islands Government (SIG) and other entities;
- Advise the SIG on policies and issues of concern to women;
- Undertake awareness and advocacy on international relevant instruments;
- Provide a forum through which women can have a voice on issues affecting them;
- Encourage participation of women in decision making processes and bodies;
- Promote awareness at all levels women's concerns; and
- Promote formation of effective partnerships with other entities as appropriate.

The Council's guiding values are "leadership with inclusiveness, passion, wisdom, commitment, pro-activeness, ownership, transparency, competitiveness, trust, creativity and innovation"
