= Vika Lusibaea =

Solomon Islands politician (born 1964)

The Right Honourable Vika Lusibaea MP

Member of Parliament for North Malaita
- In office 1 August 2012 – 19 November 2014
- Preceded by: Jimmy Lusibaea
- Succeeded by: Jimmy Lusibaea
- Majority: 33.4%

Personal details
- Party: Independent

Vika Koto Lusibaea (born 28 June 1964) is a Solomon Islands politician.

She was born in Fiji.

With no more than a primary school education, she ultimately went into business, attaining a managerial position in a private company.

Having married a Solomon Islander and established her home in the Solomons, she became a naturalised citizen of that country. Her husband is Jimmy "Rasta" Lusibaea, who was a warlord, one of the leaders of the Malaita Eagle Force, during severe ethnic conflicts in the Solomons in the late twentieth and early twenty-first centuries. After serving time in prison, he went into politics, and was elected to the National Parliament as independent MP for the North Malaita constituency in the 2010 general election, then immediately appointed as Minister for Fisheries and Marine Resources in Prime Minister Danny Philip's government. In October 2011, he lost his seat in Parliament and his position in the Cabinet upon being convicted for grievous bodily harm and assaulting a police officer, for events dating back to the interethnic violence a decade earlier. His expulsion from Parliament led to a by-election for his seat, held on 1 August 2012.

Jimmy Lusibaea asked his reluctant wife to stand in the by-election, essentially to represent him in Parliament in his place. At that stage, there had only ever been one woman elected to Parliament in the country's entire history since its independence from the United Kingdom in 1978: Hilda Kari had been an MP from 1989 to 2001. Jimmy Lusibaea later told the magazine Repúblika that when he had proposed and endorsed his wife as a candidate, he had had to overcome strong prejudice in the constituency against the notion of a woman MP:

"Tobaita, the name of our region itself, means men are bigger or more important than women and this is the mentality of us Tobaitans. I told them three things: first, that the Westminster system of government is a foreign concept with a woman, Queen Elizabeth, at its head. It is not a cultural entity otherwise I would not be putting Vika forward as a candidate. Secondly, I told them we need Vika to be elected in order for our work and the programmes we started to continue, and finally I challenged them to make history by becoming the first constituency in Malaita province to elect a woman to parliament."

The couple obtained the support of "the chiefs, church leaders and community leaders" before the election. Vika Lusibaea campaigned on a promise to continue her husband's work.

Standing as an independent against nine male candidates in the by-election, she won 49.2% of the vote, with more than three times as many votes as her closest competitor. There was some slight controversy over her victory, critics drawing attention to the fact she was a Fiji-born naturalized citizen, and to her "limited literacy skills". Her husband swiftly announced that he would not allow her to be interviewed by foreign media, informing the media simply that she would apply the same policies as his own. She herself later explained: "I only came in so he could continue all the work being done. I am just there so we have someone sitting in the chair in order for us to have access to the funding and the projects. Everything else is the same". Repúblika drew a sharp contrast between her entry in politics and that of Hilda Kari, "an independent politician acting on her own conscience", who had "campaigned and won on her own merit".

Lusibaea took her seat as a backbencher in Prime Minister Gordon Darcy Lilo's National Coalition for Rural Advancement government.

In June 2013, she spoke in a conference panel on the state of democracy in the Pacific, at the Australian National University. (Among the speakers was only one other MP from a Pacific Island country: Vanuatuan anthropologist and government minister Ralph Regenvanu.)

For the 2014 general election, she relinquished the North Malaita seat back to her husband, and stood unsuccessfully in the Central Honiara constituency.
