= East Honiara constituency =

Solomon Islands parliamentary constituency

East Honiara
- Constituency for the Solomon Islands
- Region: Honiara City Council

Current constituency
- Created: 1976
- Party: Reformed Democratic Party
- Member(s): Douglas Ete

East Honiara is a parliamentary constituency electing one representative to the National Parliament of Solomon Islands. With an electorate of 30,049 in 2006, it is by far the most heavily populated constituency in the country, being the only one (out of fifty) to consist in more than 20,000 voters. It is one of three parliamentary constituencies in the country's capital city, Honiara - the other two being Central Honiara and West Honiara.

The constituency has existed since the first Parliament in 1976. Its first MP was Bartholomew Ulufa’alu, who was later to become Prime Minister.

Charles Dausabea was elected in the 2006 general election, but subsequently lost his seat was he was convicted and jailed for fraud. This precipitated a bye-election, which Silas Milikada won with 3,453 votes.

Opinion polls suggested that Auditor General Edward Ronia was the most popular candidate to take the seat in the 2010 general election. Ultimately, however, he did not stand. There were twelve candidates for the seat, including nine independents, two rival candidates from OUR Party, and one (Douglas Ete) from the Reformed Democratic Party. Ete won by an overwhelming margin, obtaining 3,178 votes, ahead of second-placed former MP Charles Dausabea (OUR Party), who obtained 958 votes. Voter turnout, however, was only 19%.

== Members of Parliament by year ==
Election	MP	Party
1976	Bartholomew Ulufa’alu	
1980	Bartholomew Ulufa’alu	
1984	John Maetia Kauliae	
1989	Bartholomew Ulufa’alu	
1990 by-election	Charles Dausabea	
1993	John Maetia Kauluae	
1997	Charles Dausabea	
2001	Simeon Bouro	Association of Independent Members
2006	Charles Dausabea	
2008 by-election	Silas Milikada	
2010	Douglas Ete	Reform Democratic Party
2014	Douglas Ete	
2019	Douglas Ete	Democratic Party
2024	Morris Toiraena	United Party
