= Jimmy Lusibaea =

Solomon Islands politician (born 1970)

The Right Honourable Jimmy Lusibaea MP

Minister of Fisheries & Marine Resources
- In office 27 August 2010 – 30 November 2010
- Prime Minister: Danny Philip
- Preceded by: Nollen Cornelius Leni
- Succeeded by: Bodo Dettke

Minister for Infrastructure Development
- In office 26 October 2015 – 4 August 2017
- Prime Minister: Manasseh Sogavare
- Preceded by: Stanley Sofu
- Succeeded by: Stanley Sofu

Member of Parliament for North Malaita
- Incumbent
- Assumed office 19 November 2014
- Preceded by: Vika Lusibaea
- In office 20 January 2011 – 17 October 2011
- Preceded by: himself, prior to vacancy
- Succeeded by: Vika Lusibaea
- In office 4 August 2010 – 30 November 2010
- Preceded by: Daniel Enele Kwanairara
- Succeeded by: himself, following vacancy

Personal details
- Born: 7 July 1970 (age 56) Malu'u, Malaita Province
- Party: Independent (until October 2015); People's Alliance Party (since October 2015)

Jimmy Lusibaea (born 7 July 1970), also known as Jimmy "Rasta", is a Solomon Islands politician.

He was born in Malu'u, Malaita Province.

He became involved in the severe ethnic conflicts on Guadalcanal and Malaita in the early 2000s. He has been described as a "warlord", and was one of the leaders of the Malaita Eagle Force, an armed ethnic militia formed to fight for the interests of Malaitan migrants facing expulsion from Guadalcanal. He surrendered in 2003 when an international peacekeeping force, RAMSI, arrived in the Solomons. He was arrested, accused of several crimes, including having taken part in the attempted murder of bank manager Moses Garu; charges on that count were dropped when "witnesses failed to testify". He was convicted for a robbery committed in 2000, and given a five-year sentence. In 2006, he was "acquitted of the death of two special constables allegedly killed in his yard" in 2002.

Sent to prison after RAMSI's arrival, he "found religion on the inside and, on his release, set up a successful business". Having studied heavy plant mechanics at the Afutara Vocational School, he eventually became managing director of the Lion Heart Company, before going into politics in 2010.

He began his political career by standing in the North Malaita constituency in the August 2010 general election. He was elected, and appointed Minister of Fisheries and Marine Resources in Prime Minister Danny Philip's government. In September, as Fisheries Minister, he warned that the government would crack down on foreign vessels illegally fishing in Solomon Islands waters.

In September 2010, he was charged with "attempted murder with intent to cause grievous bodily harm, assault on a police officer and discharging a firearm in a public place", for crimes allegedly committed in 2001. Specifically, he was accused of inflicting head injuries on police officer Sam Manekeha, and of shooting civilian Robert Solo in both knees, while a commander in the Malaita Eagle Force. In November, he pleaded guilty in court to the charges of assault causing grievous bodily harm and assaulting a police officer, and was remanded in custody to await his sentence.

While Lusibaea was awaiting his sentence, he received unexpected praise from the Leader of the Opposition, Steve Abana. Abana declared himself impressed with Lusibaea's work as Fisheries Minister, noting his achievement in negotiating with Japan, South Korea and Taiwan, earlier in November, to successfully double the access fee for foreign vessels wishing to fish in Solomon Islands waters. Abana stated:

"Mr Lusibaea's outstanding performance and his continued assistance to community groups touched many hearts and this speaks loud and clear of the totally changed person he is now to what he was during the ethnic tension. Solomon Islands needs enthusiastic leaders like Mr Lusibaea who are keen to learn and to carry out their official obligations to the best of their ability."

On 30 November, he was sentenced to two years and nine months in gaol for assault and grievous bodily harm. As his sentence exceeded six months in gaol, he lost his seat in Parliament, and thus his position in government. He was released from gaol on parole on 14 January, reportedly for good behaviour and for having undergone rehabilitation. His early release caused an "uproar" among the Opposition, with acting Leader of the Opposition Matthew Wale requesting further explanation, and suggesting that the government might have pressured the parole board into granting Lusibaea's release.

On 20 January, the Minister for Police, James Tora, reduced Lusibaea's sentence to one month, using his discretion as Minister under section 38 of the Correctional Service Act. Consequently, as it appeared Lusibaea was no longer barred from occupying his seat, he resumed his functions in Parliament. The Opposition announced it would "challenge the matter in court". Rodney Kingmele, President of the Solomon Islands Bar Association, also criticised the decision. Lusibaea's ability to sit in Parliament as a member of the government majority was viewed as crucial at a time when the government was struggling to maintain a viable majority, in the face of defections. It was initially unclear whether Lusibaea was set to resume his post in Cabinet, but a listing of ministers in April 2011 still had the position of Fisheries Minister "vacant".

On 17 October, the High Court ruled, in the case brought by the Opposition, that the Minister for Police and the Parole Board had lacked the authority to reduce the sentence, although they did have the authority to remit it. They could reduce the execution of the sentence, but that did not alter the fact that the sentence had indeed been passed. A sentence could only be overturned by a court of appeal, or by the monarch's use of her prerogative of mercy. Thus it remained the case that, having been sentenced to two years and nine months in gaol, Lusibaea was barred from sitting in Parliament. The ruling came just as the Prime Minister had announced he intended for Lusibaea to resume his functions as Fisheries Minister - a decision rendered impossible by his renewed exclusion from Parliament.

Days after being excluded from Parliament once more, Lusibaea donated SI$74,700 to meet the tuition fees of all twenty-six students from his erstwhile constituency who were currently studying at the Solomon Islands College of Higher Education. He explained that he wished to assist and "serve the future leaders of North Malaita".

He was returned to Parliament in the 2014 general election as an independent member, and was appointed Minister for Infrastructure Development by Prime Minister Manasseh Sogavare in late October 2015. Thereupon he joined the People's Alliance Party. He was sacked from the government on 4 August 2017, and told he had not done enough to resolve the poor state of roads in the country. He remained a member of the party. Three weeks later, he was ordered by the Leadership Code Commission to pay a fine of SI$12,000 for misconduct in office. He had pleaded guilty to awarding his own company two government contracts, one to carry out road maintenance work and one to sell a side lifter truck to the Solomon Islands Ports Authority. The fine also covered the fact he had initially lied to the commission, stating that he had no shares in any company.
