= Peter Tom (politician) =

Solomon Islands politician (1964–2018)

Peter Tom (1964 – 5 November 2018) was a member of the National Parliament of the Solomon Islands. He represented a constituency in Malaita Province.

== Biography ==
He served as the Solomon Islands' Minister for Women, Youths and Children's Affairs in Prime Minister Derek Sikua's Cabinet until May 2009, when he was transferred to the position of Minister for Home Affairs.
