= Johnley Hatimoana =

Solomon Islands politician (1956–2014)

The Right Honourable Johnley Hatimoana MP

MP for Ngella
- In office 27 February 2013 – 18 April 2014
- Preceded by: Mark Kemakeza
- Succeeded by: to be determined

Personal details
- Born: 13 November 1956
- Died: 18 April 2014 (aged 57)
- Education: University of Bradford

Johnley Tekiou Hatimoana (13 November 1956 – 18 April 2014) was a Solomon Islands trade unionist and politician.

A graduate of the University of Bradford in England, he became a school teacher and a trade unionist in the Solomons, eventually becoming General Secretary of the Solomon Islands National Teachers Association. As such, he negotiated improvements for working conditions and benefits for teachers.

He was first elected to the National Parliament of Solomon Islands in a by-election in the Ngella constituency on 27 February 2013. The by-election followed Liberal MP Mark Kemakeza's forced resignation from Parliament upon being convicted and gaoled for embezzlement. Hatimoana was elected easily, seeing off a field of nine other candidates and obtaining more than twice as many votes as his closest competitor. He sat on the benches of the Opposition to Prime Minister Gordon Darcy Lilo's government.

Hatimoana was an MP for less than fourteen months. On 17 April 2014 (a day of parliamentary sitting), he was taken suddenly ill with severe pneumonia, and died in hospital the following day. No by-election was needed to replace him, as the next general election was only a few months away.
