= Jaimie Vokia =

Solomon Islands politician

Member of the National Parliament of the Solomon Islands
- Incumbent
- Assumed office 17 April 2024
- Constituency: North East Guadalcanal constituency

Personal details
- Party: Independent
- Spouse: Ethel Lency Vokia

Jaimie Vokia is a Solomon Islands politician.

== Political career ==
He lost his seat of North East Guadalcanal constituency in 2020 after being found guilty of bribing voters. His wife Ethel won the by-election.

In the 2024 Solomon Islands general election Vokia stood in place of his wife winning the Kadere Party their only parliamentary seat.

Following the election he was appointed to the Cabinet of Solomon Islands as Minister of Traditional Governance, Peace, and Ecclesiastical Affairs.

== See also ==
- 11th Parliament of Solomon Islands
