= Mark Kemakeza =

Solomon Islands politician (born 1960)

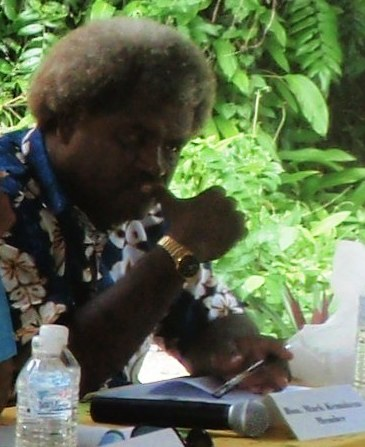
Kemakeza in 2009

Mark Roboliu Kemakeza (born December 31, 1960) is a former member of the National Parliament of the Solomon Islands. He represented Ngella constituency (Central Province). He is from Savo Island, which is in the Central Province.

In August 2010, newly elected Prime Minister Danny Philip appointed him Minister of Mines and Energy.

In April 2011, he was sacked as he faced charges for corruption and abuse of office, accused of having "misappropriated $764,000 of public funds allocated for fishing projects in his constituency". His sacking coincided with several members of the Opposition joining the government, and he was replaced as Minister for Mines and Energy by Moses Garu.

He remained a government backbencher until November 2011, when he joined a mass defection to the opposition, bringing down Philip's government.

In February 2012, he was convicted, by the Honiara Central Magistrates Court, on a charge of misappropriating government funds. He received a fourteen-month gaol sentence, with magistrate Shafi Khan describing him as "very selfish" in addition to having committed a breach of trust. He thereby lost his seat in Parliament. Johnley Hatimoana was elected to replace him as MP for Ngella.
