= Silas Tausinga =

Solomon Islands politician (born 1983)

The Right Honourable Silas Tausinga MP
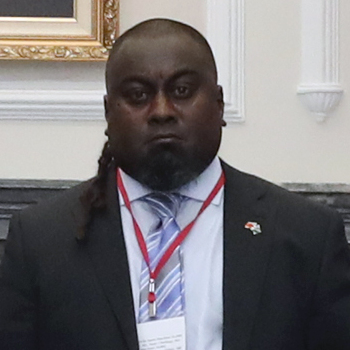
- Tausinga in 2018

Minister for Provincial Government and Institutional Strengthening
- Incumbent
- Assumed office 4 March 2012
- Prime Minister: Gordon Darcy Lilo
- Preceded by: David Tome

Member of Parliament for West New Georgia
- Incumbent
- Assumed office 4 August 2010
- Preceded by: Peter Boyers

Personal details
- Born: 12 August 1983 (age 42)
- Party: Party for Rural Advancement

Silas Vaqara Tausinga, born 12 August 1983, is a Solomon Islands politician. He is the son of Job Tausinga, who was first elected to the National Parliament in 1984.

After a secondary education, he went into work, as a bank officer at the Bank South Pacific.

He was elected to Parliament for the first time in the August 2010 general election, as MP for the West New Georgia constituency. He sat alongside his father, both of them as representatives of the Party for Rural Advancement. Despite Prime Minister Gordon Darcy Lilo being the only other member of the party in Parliament, the Tausingas initially sat on the Opposition benches. In March 2012, Silas Tausinga (but not his father) defected to the government side, and was appointed Minister for Provincial Government and Institutional Strengthening, as part of a Cabinet reshuffle. At the age of just 28, he was the youngest person in the country to become a government minister.
