= Catherine Adifaka =

Solomon Islands political candidate

Catherine Adifaka is a senior government official in the Solomon Islands. She was the first woman to be appointed as the Solomon Islands' Public Service Commissioner.

== Life ==
Adifaka was appointed to the Constitutional Congress of the Solomon Islands in 2007.
