= Aoke/Langalanga constituency =

Aoke/Langalanga
- Constituency for the National Parliament of the Solomon Islands
- Region: Malaita Province

Current constituency
- Created: 1993
- Current MP: Matthew Wale
- Party: Democratic Party

Aoke/Langalanga, also known as Auki/Langalanga, is a parliamentary constituency electing one representative to the National Parliament of Solomon Islands. It is one of fourteen constituencies in Malaita Province. It is also a relatively new constituency, having been established for the Fifth Parliament in 1993. It had an electorate of 7,365 in 2006.

Aoke/Langalanga was the constituency of Bartholomew Ulufa'alu when he became Prime Minister in 1997. Ulufa'alu lost the premiership in 2000, but continued to hold the seat until his death in 2007. A by-election was then held in 2008, which was won by Democratic Party candidate Matthew Wale.

In the 2010 general election, Wale stood for re-election against five other candidates: Richard Ulufa'alu of the Liberal Party, Judy Barty of OUR Party, and three independents. Wale was re-elected, obtaining 1,681 votes, ahead of independent candidate Billy Kwasimanu (1,512). Independent Tony Wale received exactly 1,000 votes, while the other three candidates trailed far behind: Ulufa'alu obtained 182 votes; Frank Bosi, 62; and Judy Barty, just 58. The turnout rate was 51%.

== List of MPs ==
The following MPs have represented Aoke/Langalanga in the National Parliament, since the seat was created in 1993.

Election	MP	Party
1993	Francis Joseph Saemala	
1997	Bartholomew Ulufa'alu	Liberal Party
2001	Bartholomew Ulufa'alu	Liberal Party
2006	Bartholomew Ulufa'alu	Liberal Party
2008 by-election	Matthew Wale	Democratic Party
2010	Matthew Wale	Democratic Party
2014	Matthew Wale	Independent
2019	Matthew Wale	Democratic Party
2024	Matthew Wale	Democratic Party

== Election results ==
=== 2024 ===
2024 general election
Candidate	Party	Votes
Matthew Wale	Democratic Party	4,314
David Filia	OUR	1,348
Talauburi Anisi	KAD	488
Obadiah Koti	PLD	257
Joseph Waleanisia	UP	108
Invalid/blank votes		17
Total		6,532
Registered voters		8,193

=== 2019 ===
2019 general election
Candidate	Party	Votes
Matthew Wale	Democratic Party	3,712
Vincent Anisi	Kadere Party	2,770
Faradatolo David	Independent	1,431
Invalid/blank votes		10
Total		7,923
Registered voters		8,841
Source: SIEC

=== 2014 ===
2014 general election
Candidate	Party	Votes
Matthew Wale	Independent	2,760
David Faradatolo	Democratic Alliance Party	1,966
Tony Wale	Kadere Party	979
Wilson Giloa Ne'e	Independent	784
Robert Wales Feratelia	Solomon Islands Party for Rural Advancement	26
Peter Kobiloko	Independent	24
John Jarett Maga	Independent	21
Invalid/blank votes		22
Total		6,560
Registered voters		–
Source: SIEC

=== 2010 ===
2010 general election
Candidate	Party	Votes
Matthew Wale		1,608
Billy A. Manu		1,512
Tony Wale		1,000
Frank Bosi		63
Invalid/blank votes		74
Total		4,579
Registered voters		8,791
Source: Election Passport

=== 2008 by-election ===
2008 by-election
Candidate	Party	Votes
Matthew Wale	Democratic Party	1,608
Billy A. Manu		1,022
David Faradatolo		937
Hellen Osi Huniehu		672
Billy Gizo Saenamua		454
Peter Clyde Mamisau		311
Abraham Willie Waleualo		214
Meshach Maebiru Maetoloa		63
Robert Wales Feraltelia		51
Robert Henry Alufurai		11
Invalid/blank votes		40
Total		5,383
Registered voters		–
Source: Election Passport

=== 2006 ===
2006 general election
Candidate	Party	Votes
Bartholomew Ulufa'alu	Liberal Party	1,523
Matthew Wale	Democratic Party	1,032
Rachel Fera		555
Arthold Matanani		315
Peter Baru		280
Abraham Baeanisia		161
Peter Obadae Koti		138
Benjimen Fagasi		111
Sudani Walemae		61
Alfred Polard Ludae		36
Chris Karau		32
John Paul Dio		31
Philip Jack Aru		30
Invalid/blank votes		59
Total		4,364
Registered voters		7,365
Source: Election Passport

=== 2001 ===
2001 general election
Candidate	Party	Votes
Bartholomew Ulufa'alu	Liberal Party	3,081
Francis Ferateilia Sawane		908
Peter Baru		531
Francis Joseph Saemala		152
Invalid/blank votes		–
Total		4,672
Registered voters		7,131
Source: Election Passport

=== 1997 ===
1997 general election
Candidate	Party	Votes
Bartholomew Ulufa'alu	Liberal Party	1,341
Francis Joseph Saemala		1,077
Francis Walelia		456
Jonhson Amasaea		148
Joses David Totorea		79
John Batalibasi		69
Joseph Walemola		31
Andrew Buga		23
Invalid/blank votes		–
Total		3,224
Registered voters		4,215
Source: Election Passport

=== 1993 ===
1993 general election
Candidate	Party	Votes
Francis Joseph Saemala		1,139
Bartholomew Ulufa'alu		959
Philip Jack Aru		126
Harold Maomatekwa		35
Invalid/blank votes		–
Total		2,259
Registered voters		3,043
Source: Election Passport
