= Waeta Ben Tabusasi =

Solomon Islands politician (born 1946)

Sir Waeta Ben Tabusasi KBE

Speaker of the National Parliament of Solomon Islands
- In office 14 March 1989 – 10 July 1993
- Preceded by: Lloyd Maepeza Gina
- Succeeded by: Paul Tovua

Personal details
- Born: 5 August 1946 (age 79) Konoboe, Guadalcanal, Solomon Islands
- Party: Independent
- Education: Bulolo Forestry College
- Profession: Politician

Sir Waeta Ben Tabusasi KBE (born 5 August 1946) is a Solomon Islands politician. He served as the speaker of the National Parliament of the Solomon Islands from 1989 to 1993.

== Biography ==
Tabusasi was born on 5 August 1946 and grew up in the village of Konoboe, on the island of Guadalcanal. He was educated at Houa on Guadalcanal from 1959 to 1961, then attended the Su'u Senior Primary School on Malaita from 1961 to 1963, followed by the King George VI School at Auki from 1964 to 1967. Afterwards, he joined the Solomon Islands Forestry Department as a forest guard, later studying at the Bulolo Forestry College in Papua New Guinea from 1968 to 1970. He held the position of Forest Officer in 1971 and then worked for the Coral Seas Company from 1971 to 1972, where he was a shipping clerk.

In 1973, Tabusasi entered politics, running for election to the Governing Council of the Solomon Islands, and was elected as a representative for the East Guadalcanal constituency. On the Governing Council, he served on the Social Services Committee, the Localisation Committee and the Special Select Committee on Lands and Mining. He was named Minister of Agriculture and Lands in 1973 and remained a legislator as the Governing Council became the Legislative Assembly. Although initially a member of the opposition party, he later left to become an independent. In March 1989, he was elected Speaker of the National Parliament of Solomon Islands, serving in that role until July 1993, when he was succeeded by Paul Tovua.

Tabusasi later served as the premier of Guadalcanal from 2002 until his resignation in 2004. After his service as a politician, he was appointed to a five-year term as a commissioner of the Solomon Islands Independent Commission Against Corruption, which expired in January 2025. In the 2024 Birthday Honours, he was appointed Knight Commander of the Order of the British Empire (KBE) for political and public service, and to community development.
