= Sam Iduri =

Solomon Islands politician (1949–2023)

The Right Honourable Shemuel Sam Iduri MP

Minister for National Unity, Reconciliation and Peace
- In office 22 December 2007 – 27 August 2010
- Prime Minister: Derek Sikua
- Succeeded by: Hypolite Taremae

Minister for National Unity, Reconciliation and Peace
- In office 5 May 2006 – 10 November 2007
- Prime Minister: Manasseh Sogavare

Member of Parliament for West Kwara'ae
- In office 5 April 2006 – 23 January 2023
- Preceded by: Benjamin Patrick Una
- Succeeded by: Alfred Tuasulia

Personal details
- Born: August 15, 1949
- Died: January 23, 2023 (aged 73)
- Party: Democratic Party

Shemuel Sam Iduri (15 August 1949 - 23 January 2023) was a Solomon Islands politician.

After studying at teachers' colleges in Solomon Islands and in Western Australia, he worked as a secondary school principal, then as education officer.

His political career began when he was elected to Parliament as MP for West Kwara'ae, in the April 2006 general election. The following month, the newly installed government of Prime Minister Snyder Rini resigned in the face of public protests, and so as to avoid a motion of no confidence. Iduri supported Rini's successor to the premiership, Manasseh Sogavare, and was appointed Minister for National Unity, Reconciliation and Peace in Sogavare's Cabinet - thus becoming the Minister in charge of facilitating national reconciliation in the aftermath of the ethnic conflicts of the late 1990s and early 2000s. In November 2007, he defected to the Opposition, along with nine other ministers, in an attempt to unseat the Sogavare government. The attempt was ultimately successful, and Derek Sikua replaced Sogavare as Prime Minister in late December. Sikua restored Iduri to his Cabinet post as Minister for National Unity, Reconciliation and Peace.

In August 2008, Iduri introduced a Truth and Reconciliation Commission Bill, which led to the establishing in April 2009 of the Truth and Reconciliation Commission.

Iduri retained his seat in Parliament in the August 2010 general election, but not his position in Cabinet. He was succeeded as Minister for National Unity, Reconciliation and Peace by Hypolite Taremae, in Prime Minister Danny Philip's government. He was, however, appointed Shadow Minister for National Unity, Reconciliation and Peace in Opposition Leader Steve Abana's Shadow Cabinet.

Iduri died on 23 January 2023, triggering a by-election in his constituency.
