= Daniel Enele Kwanairara =

Solomon Islands politician (1947–2012)

Daniel Enele Kwanairara (25 March 1947 – 20 October 2012 in Auki, Malaita Province) was a Solomon Islands politician.

He began his career working as a teacher, then in the government's Forestry Department. He first entered the National Parliament of Solomon Islands when he was elected MP for the North Malaita constituency in the August 1997 general election. He lost his seat in the next election in 2001, but regained it in a by-election in December 2004 when sitting member (and Minister for Communications) Daniel Fa'afunua was disqualified from Parliament upon being convicted on a charge of extortion. Kwanairara retained his seat in the 2006 general election, but stood unsuccessfully in 2010, when he was defeated by Jimmy Lusibaea.

The official website of the National Parliament reports, somewhat confusingly, that he was twice a government minister between 1989 and 1993, which is technically impossible if he was not a Member of Parliament at that time. He was Minister for Agriculture and Livestock for April 2005 to April 2006, under Prime Minister Sir Allan Kemakeza.

Daniel Kwanairara died on 20 October 2012, at the age of 65, in hospital in his home province of Malaita, "after a long illness".
