= Hilda Kari =

Solomon Islands politician (born 1949)

The Right Honourable Hilda Kari MP

Minister of Forests, Conservation and the Environment
- In office August 1997 – June 2000
- Prime Minister: Bartholomew Ulufa'alu

Minister for Women, Youth and Sports
- In office June or July 2000 – December 2001
- Prime Minister: Manasseh Sogavare

Member of Parliament for North East Guadalcanal
- In office 1989–1993
- Preceded by: Waita Ben Tabusasi
- Succeeded by: Baddley Devesi

Member of Parliament for East Central Guadalcanal
- In office 1993–2001
- Preceded by: Constituency established
- Succeeded by: Nollen Cornelius Leni

Personal details
- Party: OUR Party

Hilda Thugea Kari (born Hilda Thugea Auvi in 1949) is a Solomon Islands politician, the first woman to be elected to the National Parliament of Solomon Islands.

== Life ==
Educated in Australia, she is a senior health administrator, and President of the National Council of Women, an organisation dedicated to encouraging and facilitating women's participation in politics.

She was the first woman to be elected to the National Parliament of Solomon Islands, although Lilly Ogatina was indirectly elected to the Legislative Council in 1965.

She successfully contested the 1989 by-election for the North East Guadalcanal seat caused by MP Waita Ben Tabusasi vacating his seat to become Speaker. She was re-elected, as MP for East Central Guadalcanal, in the 1993 general election, and again in 1997, thus serving until 2001.

She was Minister for Forestry, the Environment and Conservation from 1997 to 2000, under Prime Minister Bartholomew Ulufa'alu; she was the first woman in Cabinet in the country's history. Ulufa'alu resigned in June 2000 after being kidnapped by the Malaita Eagle Force in a context of rising ethnic tensions. Kari then served as Minister for Youth, Women and Sport under his successor Manasseh Sogavare, from 2000 to 2001. She is also recorded as having been briefly Minister for Lands and Housing in 2000, although it is not known whether this was under Ulufa'alu or Sogavare.

She stood unsuccessfully in the 2010 general election for the seat of North East Guadalcanal. Reacting to the fact that no women had been elected, she described the overall result as "a real slap on the face for women in this country", and was particularly critical of women voters who, in her view, displayed a lack of "trust" in women candidates.

== See also ==
- Vika Lusibaea, second woman elected to the Parliament of Solomon Islands (in 2012)
