= Toswel Kaua =

Solomon Islands politician (1947–2010)

The Right Honourable Toswel Kaua MP

Minister for Justice and Legal Affairs
- In office 21 December 2007 – 5 May 2009
- Prime Minister: Derek Sikua
- Succeeded by: Laurie Chan

Deputy Prime Minister and Minister for Public Service
- In office 3 May 2007 – 10 November 2007
- Prime Minister: Manasseh Sogavare

Minister for Agriculture and Livestock
- In office 18 October 2006 – 3 May 2007
- Prime Minister: Manasseh Sogavare

Minister for Mines and Energy
- In office 5 May 2006 – 18 October 2006
- Prime Minister: Manasseh Sogavare

Member of Parliament for Baegu/Asifolo
- In office 5 April 2006 – 15 November 2010
- Preceded by: Stephen Aumanu
- Succeeded by: David Tome

Personal details
- Born: 28 August 1947 Lau, Malaita Province
- Died: 15 November 2010 (aged 63) Honiara
- Party: Party for Rural Advancement
- Education: University of Oxford

Toswel Kaua (born 28 August 1947 in Lau, Malaita Province; died 15 November 2010 in Honiara) was a Solomon Islands politician, several times Cabinet minister, and Deputy Prime Minister from May to November 2007.

He studied first at the University of Sydney (Australia), where he obtained a Certificate in Administration, Management and Systems. He then obtained a Certificate in Teaching from the Solomon Islands Teachers College, followed by a Diploma in Education and a Post-Graduate Diploma in Education from the University of Newcastle upon Tyne (England). He completed his studies with a Post-Graduate Certificate in Teaching from the University of Oxford, and began a career in teaching and administration.

He taught at St. Nicholas primary school, in Solomon Islands, before becoming the school's headmaster. He then entered public administration as Assistant Education Officer for Selection and Guidance at the Ministry of Education. He went on to serve as Chief Administrative Officer for Regulation at the Ministry of Public Service, Assistant Secretary for Personnel to the Prime Minister's Office, Under-Secretary at the Public Service Division, Deputy Secretary to the Prime Minister and Cabinet, then Permanent Secretary to a number of Ministries, before becoming Secretary to the Prime Minister and Cabinet.

He began his political career when he was elected to Parliament as the member for Baegu/Asifola in the April 2006 general election. In May, Prime Minister Snyder Rini's government resigned in the face of public protest and under threat of a motion of no confidence, and Manasseh Sogavare ascended to the premiership. Sogavare appointed Kaua to Cabinet, as Minister for Mines and Energy. He subsequently appointed him Minister for Agriculture and Livestock, then Deputy Prime Minister and Minister for Public Service. In November 2007, however, Kaua resigned from Cabinet and joined the Opposition. The following month, Sogavare's government was ousted in a vote of no confidence, and Kaua was appointed Minister for Justice and Legal Affairs by new Prime Minister Derek Sikua, a position which he held until he left the government for health reasons in May 2009.

He retained his seat in Parliament in the August 2010 general election, and served as a government backbencher for the remaining months of his life. On 15 November 2010, he died in hospital following a "long illness".
