= Truth and Reconciliation Commission (Solomon Islands) =

The Solomon Islands Truth and Reconciliation Commission (TRC) is a commission officially established by the government of Solomon Islands in September 2008. It has been formed to investigate the causes of the ethnic violence that gripped Solomon Islands between 1997 and 2003. The Truth and Reconciliation Commission is the first of its kind in the Pacific Islands region.

The purpose of the Truth and Reconciliation Commission is to "address people's traumatic experiences during the five-year ethnic conflict on Guadalcanal (1999–2003)". Its goal is to promote national unity and reconciliation. The members of the TRC will hear testimony from witnesses and victims of the violence, which killed over 100 people and displaced more than 20,000 internal refugees nationwide.

It is modelled after the Truth and Reconciliation Commission of South Africa, which was chaired by then Archbishop Desmond Tutu. Tutu, a Nobel Peace Prize recipient, has taken an active role in the establishment of the TRC in Solomon Islands.

== Background of the conflict ==
Solomon Islands descended into ethnic violence between 1997 and 2003. Much of the violence was committed by rival ethnic gangs from the islands of Guadalcanal and Malaita. The gangs took advantage of ethnic tensions between Malaitan settlers on Guadalcanal and the island's indigenous residents. The Isatabu Freedom Movement, which was made up by indigenous residents of the island of Guadalcanal, fought for several years with the Malaita Eagle Force, a militia group consisting mainly of residents and settlers from Malaita. The two groups fought for political power, jobs and land rights, especially on the island of Guadalcanal.

The violence was finally quelled by the Australian-led Regional Assistance Mission to Solomon Islands (RAMSI), which was invited into the country by the government of former Prime Minister Allan Kemakeza in 2003. RAMSI finalised operations in Solomon Islands as of 30 June 2017.

== Formation of the Commission ==
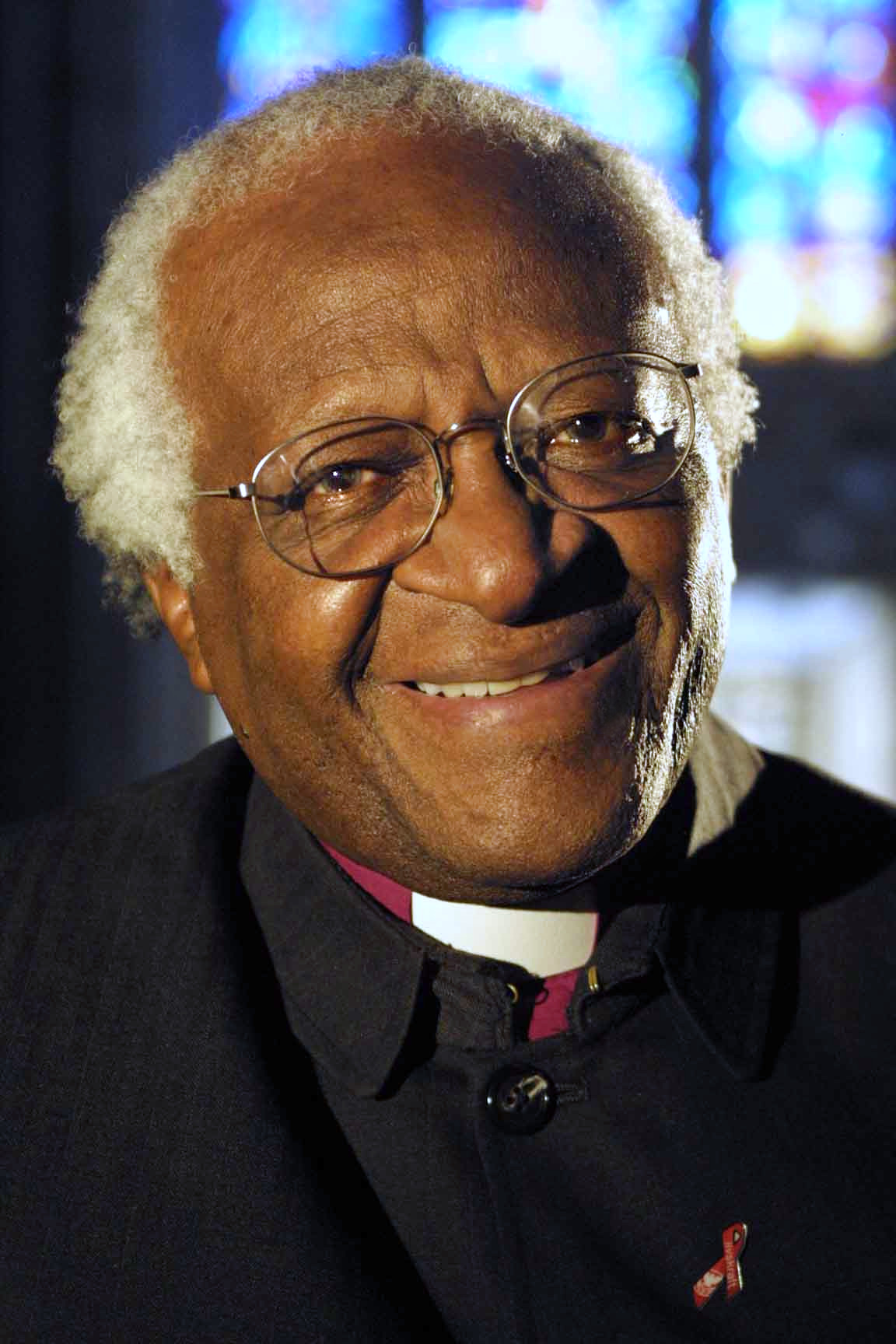
Archbishop Desmond Tutu supported the creation of the TRC in Solomon Islands.

In late August 2008, Sam Iduri, Minister for Peace and Reconciliation, introduced a Truth and Reconciliation Commission Bill to the National Parliament of Solomon Islands. In February 2009, it was reported that Archbishop Desmond Tutu, former chair of the Truth and Reconciliation Commission of South Africa, would visit the Solomons in April to assist in setting up the Commission.

Australia has contributed approximately A$500,000 towards the establishment of the Truth and Reconciliation Commission.

=== Commission members ===
The Truth and Reconciliation Commission is composed of five members, three of which are citizens of the Solomon Islands, while two others were chosen from outside of the country. There are three men and two women.

The National Selection Committee was charged with choosing the five members of the TRC. The Chairman of the National Selection Committee, Chief Justice of the Solomon Islands Supreme Court Sir Albert Palmer, submitted the names of the proposed members to the Prime Minister of Solomon Islands on 22 April 2009, as required by the Truth and Reconciliation Act of 2008 (TRC Act, 2008).

The Prime Minister of Solomon Islands Derek Sikua announced the five members of the TRC on 27 April 2009, two days before the launch of the Commission. Sikua thanked the selection committee for working to choose the members of the commission. "I also wish to thank our people for their participation and in thanking them, I wish to call on our people to help the Truth and Reconciliation Commission because without the Truth there can be no true reconciliation and thus no lasting national peace, unity and healing."

By law, the members of the TRC must begin their investigations within fourteen days of their appointment by Prime Minister Sikua.

The five members of the Truth and Reconciliation Commission (TRC) are:

- Reverend Sam Ata of Malaita Province, Solomon Islands (Chairman)
- George Kejoa of Guadalcanal, Solomon Islands
- Caroline Laore of Western Province, Solomon Islands
- Ratu Joni Madraiwiwi of Fiji
- Sofia Macher, a human rights activist from Peru (Deputy Chair)

== Opening of the Truth and Reconciliation Commission ==
The Commission was officially launched on 29 April 2009, at the Lawson Tama Stadium in Honiara, the capital of Solomon Islands.

Thousands of Solomon Islanders attended the opening, which included a speech by Archbishop Desmond Tutu. Tutu spoke of the need for forgiveness in the country to achieve a long term, sustainable peace. Prime Minister Derek Sikua told the crowd that the TRC marked an important day in the history of Solomon Islands and the years of ethnic violence which engulfed the country, "The launching of the Commission is a vital part of the efforts as Solomon Islands continue to work towards closure of a most challenging chapter in the history of the country, when disputes led to conflict and conflict erupted into violence between communities."

Tutu also hosted a conference called the Winds of Change, which brought together former combatants from Malaita and Guadalcanal for reconciliation talks.

== Beginning of public hearings ==
The Commission's first public hearings were held in March 2010, with victims called upon to describe their sufferings during the violence. The Commission explained that the aim of the process was to provide victims with an opportunity to be heard, "end th[e] silence and make the whole country to give recognition to their sufferings" : "Above all, it will help to restore the dignity of the victims, to retrieve the memory of those who were killed, and to hear the voice of those who were humiliated and abused in countless ways." Victims were permitted to name groups who had caused their suffering, but not individuals. The Commission would not pass judgement, but treat the hearings as "moments to listen with respect and compassion".

The opening of the hearings was attended by Governor-General Frank Kabui, Prime Minister Derek Sikua, Speaker of Parliament Sir Peter Kenilorea and the Chief Justice.
