= John Moffat Fugui =

Solomon Islands politician (1961–2022)

The Right Honourable John Moffat Fugui

Ambassador of the Solomon Islands to China
- In office 22 May 2021 – 22 December 2022
- Preceded by: Position established

Minister for the Environment, Climate Change, Disaster Management and Meteorology
- In office 27 August 2010 – 22 October 2012
- Prime Minister: Danny Philip; Gordon Darcy Lilo
- Succeeded by: Bradley Tovosia

Member of Parliament for Central Honiara
- In office 4 August 2010 – 14 February 2020
- Preceded by: Nelson Ne'e
- Succeeded by: Alfred Efona

Personal details
- Born: 9 September 1961 Fourau, Malaita Province, British Solomon Islands Protectorate
- Died: 22 December 2022 (aged 61) Beijing, China
- Party: Independent
- Education: University of Hawaiʻi

John Moffat Fugui (9 September 1961 – 22 December 2022) was a Solomon Islands politician and political adviser. He served as Minister for the Environment, Climate Change, Disaster Management and Meteorology in Prime Minister Danny Philip's Cabinet. He was also in his later years the first Solomon Islands Ambassador to China and died as it in December 2022.

== Life and career ==
Fugui was born on 9 September 1961. He obtained his first Master's degree at the University of Canterbury in New Zealand, then two more at the University of Hawaiʻi in the United States, where he was enrolled in a PhD program. He subsequently worked as a political adviser to the Solomon Islands government.

His career in national politics began when he was elected to Parliament as the member for Central Honiara (the capital city) in the August 2010 general election, standing as an independent candidate. He was then appointed Minister for the Environment, Climate Change, Disaster Management and Meteorology in Prime Minister Danny Philip's Cabinet. When Gordon Darcy Lilo replaced Philip as Prime Minister in November 2011, Fugui retained his position in government.

On 22 October 2012, Fugui left the government. He announced that he had resigned because he had had no permanent secretary for seven months; Prime Minister Lilo stated that he had sacked him for siding with the Opposition. Lilo replaced him with Bradley Tovosia.

Following the 2014 general election, in which he retained his seat, Fugui was elected Deputy Speaker of the National Parliament, on 17 December. On 14 February 2020, he was stripped of his title as a Member of Parliament for Central Honiara Constituency due to evidence of misconduct.

In 2021, Fugui was appointed the first Solomon Islands Ambassador to China, he arrived in China on 22 May.

Fugui died on 22 December 2022, of cardiac arrest, at the age of 61, in Beijing during the COVID-19 pandemic in Beijing. He was the seventh foreign diplomat in China to die in two years.
