= Fataleka constituency =

Single-member constituency of the National Parliament of Solomon Islands

Fataleka
- Single-member constituency for the National Parliament of the Solomon Islands
- Region: Malaita Province

Current constituency
- Created: 1993
- Current MP: Steve Abana
- Party: Independent

Fataleka is a single-member constituency of the National Parliament of Solomon Islands. Located on the island of Malaita, it was established in 1993 when the National Parliament was expanded from 38 to 47 seats.

== List of MPs ==
Election	MP	Party
1993	John Musuota	
1997	Ronnie Mannie	
2001	Casper Cassidy Luiramo	
2006	Steve Abana	
2010	Steve Abana	Democratic Party
2014	Steve Abana	Independent
2019	Rexon Annex Ramofafia	United Party
2024	Rexon Annex Ramofafia	OUR Party

== Election results ==
=== 2019 ===
2019 general election
Candidate	Party	Votes
Rexon Annex Ramofafia	Solomon Islands United Party	2,628
Steve Abana	Democratic Alliance Party	1,777
Moffat Ramofafia	Solomon Islands People First Party	938
Dr. Luke Mani	Independent	395
Allen Bae	Independent	326
Elison Lade	Independent	190
Felix Kabini Laumae	Independent	118
Ross Siosi	Independent	13
Invalid/blank votes		13
Total		6,398
Registered voters		7,139
Source: Solomon Elections

=== 2014 ===
2014 general election
Candidate	Party	Votes
Steve Abana	Independent	1,413
Sevrino Maegwali	Independent	1,010
Allen Siau	Solomon Islands People First Party	423
Felix Taloinao Laumae Kabini	Independent	418
Charles Dausabea	People's Progressive Party	385
Maesua David Jack	Independent	224
Movin Kutaxation Kutai	Pan-Melanesian Congress	116
Nickson Martin Atu	Kadare Party	99
Hellen Luiramo Hodges	Independent	98
Peter Bubulu	Youth Owned Rural and Urban Party	32
Moffat Sanga Fugui	Independent	21
Mani Robert	Independent	0
Billy Dauma	Independent	0
Invalid/blank votes		28
Total		
Registered voters		
Source: Election Passport

=== 2010 ===
2010 general election
Candidate	Party	Votes
Steve Abana	Democratic Party	1,954
Felix Taloinao Laumae Kabini		978
Solomon Auga		927
Thomas Ifuimae	Ownership, Unity and Responsibility Party	587
Gregson Genesis Angisia		422
Jeniffer Fugui		216
Allen Siau		199
John Ruruka		49
Peter Bubulu		14
Invalid/blank votes		364
Total		5,710
Registered voters		10,166
Source: Election Passport

=== 2006 ===
2006 general election
Candidate	Party	Votes
Steve Abana		1,056
Felix Taloinao Laumae Kabini		989
Gabriel Kaula		684
Casper Cassidy Luiramo		574
Andy Tony Tosasai		143
Wilson Maemae		143
David Siau		127
George Paul Fia		122
Hendry Ra'aga		46
Alice Kakabu Baekalia		37
Catherine Leta		34
Samuel Ifuna'au		28
Patrick Uma		17
George Abana Sanga		13
Billy Dauma		1
Invalid/blank votes		41
Total		4,055
Registered voters		6,586
Source: Election Passport

=== 2001 ===
2001 general election
Candidate	Party	Votes
Casper Cassidy Luiramo		1,067
Ronnie Mannie		868
Frank Dele Iamaea		548
Fred Bae		543
William Isui		384
George Mamimu		282
Paul Henry Ratu		174
Stephen T Iromea		83
Saxon Talo		66
Matthew Iroga		44
Invalid/blank votes		
Total		4,059
Registered voters		5,785
Source: Election Passport

=== 1997 ===
1997 general election
Candidate	Party	Votes
Ronnie Mannie		683
John Musuota		462
Matthew Iroga		207
Cornelius Donga		187
Sam Sipolo		139
Clement Lemani		130
Gregson Genesis Angisia		123
Casper Cassidy Luiramo		121
Frank Dele Iamaea		120
Nicholas Niko Rubosa		106
Jeffrey Iniota		105
Bala Babanimae		85
David Dauwane		79
Tony Kedeau		62
Invalid/blank votes		
Total		2,609
Registered voters		3,594
Source: Election Passport

=== 1993 ===
1993 general election
Candidate	Party	Votes
John Musuota		494
Jeffrey Iniota		389
Johnson Moffat Ramoni		338
Aloisio Tania		223
Felix Laumae		210
Ronald Ila Fugui		170
Alban Funasui Gua		121
Joseph Taega		98
Shemuel Siau		80
Invalid/blank votes		
Total		2,123
Registered voters		3,118
Source: Election Passport
