= Ethel Lency Vokia =

Solomon Islands politician

Ethel Lency Vokia is a member of the National Parliament of the Solomon Islands. In 2020 she became the fourth woman in the 2019-2024 Parliament and only the sixth woman ever to be elected to that Parliament.

== Political career ==
Vokia's husband, Jaimie Vokia, had been elected to the Solomon Islands Parliament in 2019 as the representative of North East Guadalcanal constituency on the island of Guadalcanal. However, he was subsequently found guilty of bribing voters and was dismissed from office. His wife ran as an Independent candidate in the by-election to replace him and secured victory, defeating candidates who included the former prime minister, Derek Sikua, who had been member of parliament for North East Guadalcanal from 2006 to 2019. Sikua had originally been responsible for the electoral petition alleging bribery, which led to Jamie Vokia's dismissal. Ethel Vokia became the fourth woman in the 50-member 2019-2024 parliament, joining Freda Soria Comua, Lanelle Tanangada and Lillian Maefai.

Vokia's first act after being elected was to allocate funds earmarked for her constituency to the purchase of three boats with 30 hp engines. These were provided to the communities of Siara, Kerakoka, and Tivilae, to enable people to get their produce to local markets. She then resumed a housebuilding scheme initiated by her husband, which had ceased to operate after his dismissal. She also used constituency funds to pay the fees of 41 students at the Solomon Islands National University in the capital, Honiara.

In the 2024 Solomon Islands general election she was replaced by her husband who was elected as the sole Kadere Party MP.
