= Nestor Ghiro =

Solomon Islands politician (born 1972)

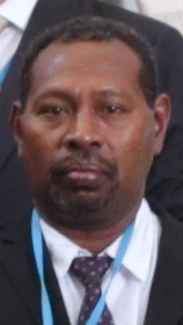
- Nestor Ghiro poses for an official photo as part of the delegation led by Solomon Islands Prime Minister Manasseh Sogavare (26 September 2017) in Taipei, Taiwan

Minister of Provincial Government and Institutional Strengthening
- Incumbent
- Assumed office 1 November 2017

Member of Parliament for Central Makira
- Incumbent
- Assumed office December 2014

Personal details
- Party: Independent

Nestor Ghiro (born 4 September 1972) is a politician of Solomon Islands who served as Minister of Provincial Government and Institutional Strengthening from 1 November 2017. He has been a Member of Parliament for the constituency of Central Maikra since the 2014 general election, and was re-elected in 2019 with 70.4% of the vote.
