= Steve Abana =

Solomon Islands politician (born 1969)

The Right Honourable Steve William Abana MP

Leader of the Opposition
- In office 25 August 2010 – 23 March 2011
- Monarch: Elizabeth II
- Prime Minister: Danny Philip
- Succeeded by: Derek Sikua

Minister for National Planning and Aid Coordination
- In office 21 December 2007 – 25 August 2010
- Prime Minister: Derek Sikua
- Succeeded by: Snyder Rini

Minister for National Planning and Aid Coordination
- In office 16 October 2006 – 10 November 2007
- Prime Minister: Manasseh Sogavare

Member of Parliament for Fataleka
- Incumbent
- Assumed office 5 April 2006
- Preceded by: Casper Luiramo

Personal details
- Born: 1969 (age 56–57)
- Party: Democratic Party
- Education: Fiji National University (FNU)

Steve William Abana (born 1969) is a Solomon Islands politician. He is a former Member of Parliament for Fataleka and was the Leader of Her Majesty's Opposition from August 2010 to March 2011.

Abana studied at the Fiji College of Agriculture (FCA), where he obtained a Diploma in Tropical Agriculture. Before his political career, he was a teacher at the Honiara High School. He then entered business, exporting cocoa during the height of the ethnic tension. After being successful, he started Anolpha Enterprises and became the managing director.

His career in national politics began when he was elected MP for Fataleka, a constituency in his native Malaita Province, in the April 2006 general election. In October, he benefited from a reshuffle in Prime Minister Manasseh Sogavare's Cabinet, and was appointed Minister for National Planning and Aid Coordination. In November 2007, Sogavare dismissed him from office, accusing him of seeking support to oust him from the premiership. The following month, the Sogavare government was toppled by a motion of no confidence, and Abana supported new Prime Minister Derek Sikua, who re-appointed him as Minister for National Planning and Aid Coordination.

As leader of the Democratic Party, Abana was a key member of Sikua's Coalition for National Unity and Rural Advancement government. Abana led the Democratic Party into the August 2010 general election, campaigning on a promise of "more recognition to tribal landowners by registering all tribal lands in the name of tribes"; "the implementation of a National Adaptation Plan to address Climate Change for the most vulnerable communities; a focus to improve the standard of living in villages consistent with the Millennium Development Goals"; a pledge "to ensure that 80 percent of energy in the country be produced from renewable resources"; and electoral reform to introduce preferential voting. The election was a comparative success for the Democrats: They obtained thirteen seats (out of fifty), whereas no other party obtained more than three, and Abana was re-elected MP for Fataleka.

Abana then stood for the premiership, against Danny Philip of the breakaway Reformed Democratic Party. Abana received the support of twenty-three MPs, but Philip was elected Prime Minister with the support of twenty-six. Abana became the formal Leader of the Opposition, and appointed the Shadow Cabinet.

He stepped down as Leader of the Opposition on 23 March 2011, stating briefly that the Opposition needed to "revive itself". Two weeks later, he joined the ranks of the government, bringing with him several other Opposition MPs.

== See also ==
- Leader of the Opposition (Solomon Islands)
- Shadow Cabinet of Solomon Islands
