= Matthew Wale =

Solomon Islands politician (born 1968)

The Honourable Matthew Wale CBE
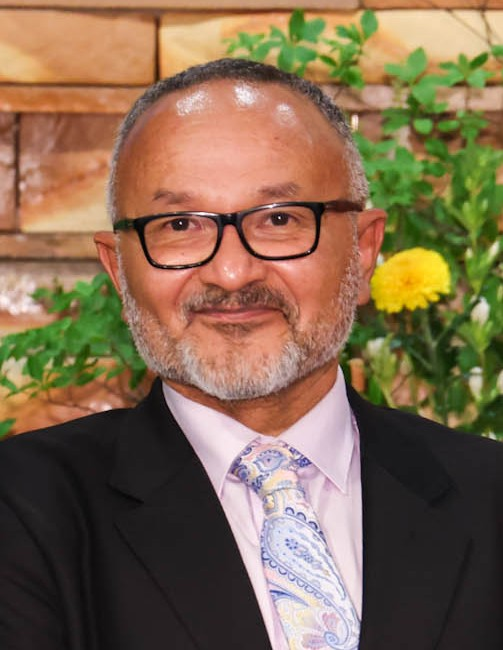
- Wale in 2026

Prime Minister of Solomon Islands
- Incumbent
- Assumed office 15 May 2026
- Monarch: Charles III
- Governor-General: Sir David Tiva Kapu
- Deputy: Francis Sade
- Preceded by: Jeremiah Manele

Leader of the Opposition
- In office 17 May 2019 – 15 May 2026
- Preceded by: Manasseh Maelanga
- Succeeded by: Manasseh Sogavare

Member of Parliament for Aoke/Langalanga
- Incumbent
- Assumed office 27 March 2008
- Preceded by: Bartholomew Ulufa'alu

Personal details
- Born: 13 June 1968 (age 58) Ambu Village, Malaita Province, British Solomon Islands
- Party: Democratic Party

Matthew Cooper Wale CBE (born 13 June 1968) is a Solomon Islands politician serving as prime minister of Solomon Islands since 2026. A member of the Democratic Party, he has been a member of the National Parliament of Solomon Islands since 2008, representing the Aoke/Langalanga constituency, and served as the official Leader of the Opposition from 2019 to 2026.

== Political career ==
Wale was elected in a special election held on 27 March 2008 following the death of sitting MP Bartholomew Ulufa'alu.

Following the 2019 general election, Wale was appointed as Leader of the Opposition on 17 May 2019.

In 2021, amid mass unrest in the country, Wale called for Prime Minister Manasseh Sogavare to step down. On 28 November 2021, Wale filed a no-confidence motion against the Sogavare government, with debate scheduled for 6 December. The motion was ultimately defeated.

Wale opposed the security agreement signed by Sogavare and the Chinese government in 2022.

Following the 2024 general election, Wale was a nominee for the position of prime minister. Wale, who received 18 votes, lost to Jeremiah Manele, who received 31 votes.

He was appointed Commander of the Order of the British Empire (CBE) in the 2025 New Year Honours for political and public service.

On 15 May 2026, Wale was elected prime minister by the National Parliament of Solomon Islands after Manele was removed in a no-confidence vote on 7 May. In June 2026, Wale announced that he would review a security agreement with China signed by then-prime minister Sogavare in 2022.
