= Manasseh Maelanga =

Solomon Islands politician (born 1970)

The Honourable Manasseh Maelanga MP
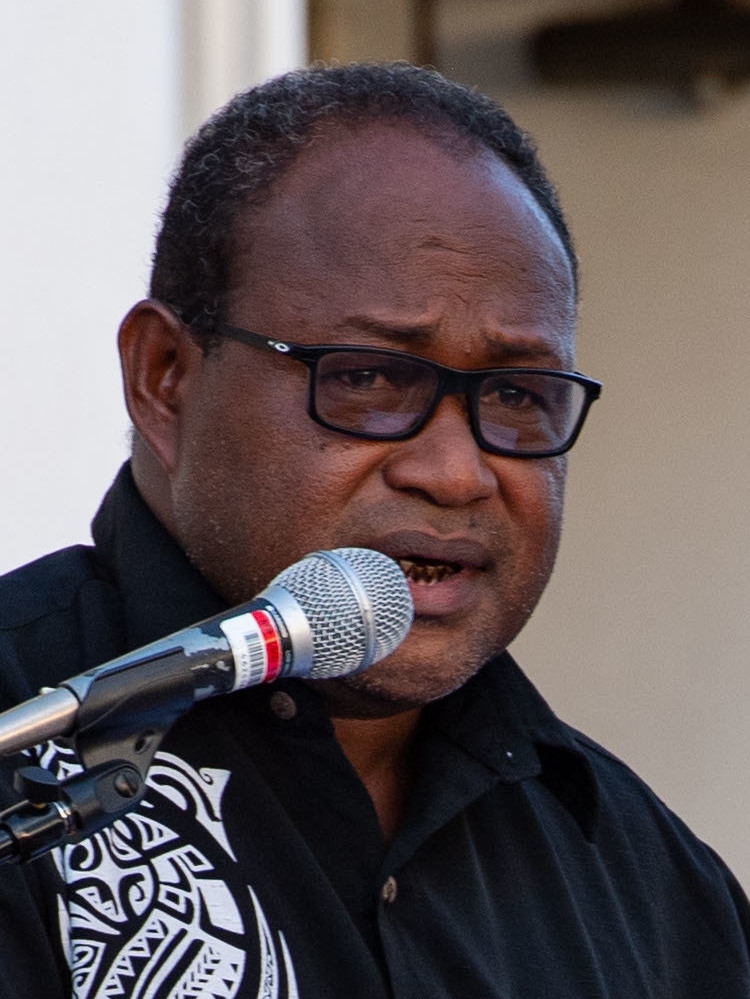
- Maelanga speaks at 2022 Pacific Partnership

Minister of Home Affairs
- In office 17 May 2026 – 31 August 2026
- Prime Minister: Matthew Wale

Deputy Prime Minister of Solomon Islands
- In office 1 November 2019 – 6 May 2024
- Prime Minister: Manasseh Sogavare; Jeremiah Manele
- Preceded by: John Maneniaru
- Succeeded by: Bradley Tovosia
- In office 22 November 2011 – 8 September 2014
- Prime Minister: Gordon Darcy Lilo
- Preceded by: Himself
- In office 27 August 2010 – 11 November 2011
- Prime Minister: Danny Philip
- Succeeded by: Himself

Leader of the Opposition
- In office 24 November 2017 – 17 May 2019
- Preceded by: Jeremiah Manele
- Succeeded by: Matthew Wale

Member of Parliament for East Malaita
- Incumbent
- Assumed office 27 March 2008
- Preceded by: Joses Wawari Sanga

Manasseh Maelanga (born March 25, 1970) is the current Minister for Home Affairs in Solomon Islands. He is the current Member of Parliament for East Malaita constituency.

In May 2009, he was named Minister for Provincial Government and Institutional Strengthening in Prime Minister Derek Sikua's government. Following the 2010 general election, he remained in Cabinet, under new Prime Minister Danny Philip, as Deputy Prime Minister and Minister of Home Affairs.

Since 17 December 2014, he has served as Leader of the Independent Members in Parliament.

In 2026, he was ordained a priest in the Anglican Church of Melanesia.

He assumed the office of Minister of Home Affairs in May 2026, but resigned on August 31. He then filed a no-confidence motion against Maelanga the following month, but withdrew citing public pressure and religious guidance.
