= 2024 Solomon Islands general election =

- 17 April 2024
- All 50 seats in the National Parliament; 26 seats needed for a majority
- Turnout: 82.54% (▼3.88pp)
Party	Leader	Vote %	Seats	+/–
OUR Party	Manasseh Sogavare	24.07	15	New
Democratic Party	Matthew Wale	19.31	11	+3
United Party	Peter Kenilorea Jr.	13.48	6	+4
Kadere Party	Martin Housanau	4.89	1	−7
SIPRA	Gordon Darcy Lilo	4.55	1	0
People First	Jimmie Rodgers	3.19	3	+2
Umi for Change	Daniel Suidani	3.00	1	New
Democratic Alliance	Rick Houenipwela	1.59	1	−2
Independents	–	21.88	11	−10
This lists parties that won seats. See the complete results below.
Results by constituency
Prime Minister before	Prime Minister after
Manasseh Sogavare; OUR Party	Jeremiah Manele; OUR Party

General elections were held in Solomon Islands on 17 April 2024 to determine the composition of the 12th Parliament. Initially planned for 2023, parliament voted in 2022 to delay the elections. Prime Minister Manasseh Sogavare claimed the country could not afford to have an election in the same year the Solomon Islands were hosting the Pacific Games. The opposition condemned the delay and accused Sogavare of a power grab.

A major campaign issue included the country's ties with China; however, domestic issues were a primary concern amongst many voters, including the cost of living, the national debt and medicine shortages. Eight parties and ten independents won seats. Prime Minister Sogavare's Ownership, Unity and Responsibility Party (OUR) won the most seats, securing 15, but fell short of a majority. The opposition Coalition for Accountability, Reform and Empowerment (CARE) bloc, made up of the Democratic Party, Democratic Alliance and the Umi for Change Party, won a combined 13 seats. Another opposition party, the United Party (UP), secured six seats.

After the election, the OUR Party established the Coalition of National Unity and Transformation with the Kadere and People First parties. On 29 April, Sogavare announced he would not seek another term as prime minister in the 2 May parliamentary vote. The coalition nominated Foreign Minister Jeremiah Manele in his place, while CARE, UP and the Solomon Islands Party for Rural Advancement (SIPRA) selected Matthew Wale. Manele went on to defeat Wale, with the support of most of the independents.

== Background ==
The previous election, held in 2019, took place following amendments to the electoral act in 2018, which introduced additional measures to prevent electoral fraud, including stricter penalties for candidates and voters engaging in bribery and the implementation of a campaign blackout the day before the election to deter vote-buying. However, the maximum campaign budget for candidates saw a rapid increase from SI$50,000 to SI$500,000, resulting in cases of lavish campaign spending. Results showed no party obtained a majority as in previous elections. Of the eight parties that secured seats, the Solomon Islands Democratic and Kadere parties emerged as the largest; both won eight. Independents won the other 21 seats.

With no dominant party, two blocs formed to compete to take the reins of government. Manasseh Sogavare, who had previously served three non-consecutive terms as prime minister, two of which ended in no-confidence votes, refounded his Ownership, Unity and Responsibility Party (OUR) shortly after the election. The OUR Party, along with the Kadere, People First and Democratic Alliance parties, formed the Democratic Coalition Government for Advancement (DCGA) bloc with Sogavare as the DCGA's nominee for prime minister. On the other hand, the Solomon Islands United Party, Solomon Islands Democratic Party and the United Democratic Party formed the Grand Coalition; Matthew Wale was the bloc's prime ministerial nominee. Wale challenged Sogavare's eligibility to serve as prime minister in court, claiming he was ineligible as he registered his party after the election, in breach of the electoral act. The High Court suspended Parliament's vote for prime minister shortly before it was to occur on 24 April, having issued an injunction. However, citing the constitution, Governor-General Frank Kabui ordered the vote to proceed. In response, Wale and the Grand Coalition boycotted the vote while the remaining members elected Sogavare prime minister. Wale then became leader of the opposition. Sogavare's return as prime minister resulted in riots in Honiara, stemming from public frustration over the lack of citizen involvement with government formation. The High Court later dismissed the case against Sogavare's eligibility to run for prime minister. The OUR Party saw numerous MPs join after the election, and by November 2019, the party had attained a comfortable majority of 32 seats.

=== 2021 unrest ===
In November 2021, protests broke out in Honiara near parliament. Sogavare's government withdrew Solomon Islands' recognition of Taiwan in 2019 and established diplomatic ties with China. The switch faced condemnation by the opposition and the provincial government of Malaita, which maintained de facto relations with Taipei, increasing tensions between Sogavare and Malaita Premier Daniel Suidani. Many protesters were from Malaita province and demanded Sogavare's resignation due to the decision to pursue ties with Beijing, along with other factors, including allegations of the central government ignoring the public on issues including infrastructure. When Sogavare did not address the demonstrators, riots broke out. Police attempted to disperse the crowds by firing tear gas while the government imposed a 36-hour lockdown in the capital. Demonstrators defied the curfew and took to Honiara's Chinatown. Numerous businesses and a police station were burnt down, resulting in three deaths. Once the rioting ceased, military personnel and police from Australia, Fiji, New Zealand and Papua New Guinea were deployed to help restore order. Opposition Leader Matthew Wale called for Sogavare to do "the honourable thing and resign" and announced he would file a no-confidence motion if the prime minister refused. Sogavare resisted calls to step down and blamed interference from unnamed foreign powers for the riots, stating, "I don't want to name names...we know who they are". Wale subsequently introduced a no-confidence motion, which Parliament voted on in December 2021. During the debate, Sogavare claimed the "innocent people of Malaita have been lied to by these agents of Taiwan" and described the riots as an "attempted illegal coup". Sogavare survived the no-confidence motion with 32 MPs voting to keep him in office.

=== Security pact with China ===
In March 2022, the DCGA government signed a security pact with China, which permits Solomon Islands to request the deployment of Chinese military personnel to assist the Royal Solomon Islands Police Force in restoring order in the event of a similar incident to the 2021 protests and riots. In such a scenario, Chinese personnel would also protect Chinese-owned businesses, nationals and diplomats. The full details of the pact were not made public. Reportedly, a part of his "friends to all, enemy to none" foreign policy, Prime Minister Sogavare believed that the pact would benefit Solomon Islands by providing the country with more stability, which would attract more investors and result in further development. The opposition condemned the agreement, claiming it would provide more leverage for Chinese influence that would undermine Solomon Islands' democracy. They pledged to repeal it if they were to oust the DCGA government at the election. Two groups, Transparency Solomon Islands and Solomon Islands Council of Women, claimed the pact would not represent the public's interests, that it would effectively cede the country's sovereignty to China and condemned its alleged lack of holistic consultation with Solomon Islanders. Australia, Fiji, Japan, the Federated States of Micronesia, New Zealand and the United States voiced concerns with the pact. These countries, along with others in the region, also feared how the agreement might allow China to establish a military base in Solomon Islands, which both Honiara and Beijing denied. The pact prompted the United States to re-open an embassy in Honiara in 2023.

== Electoral system ==
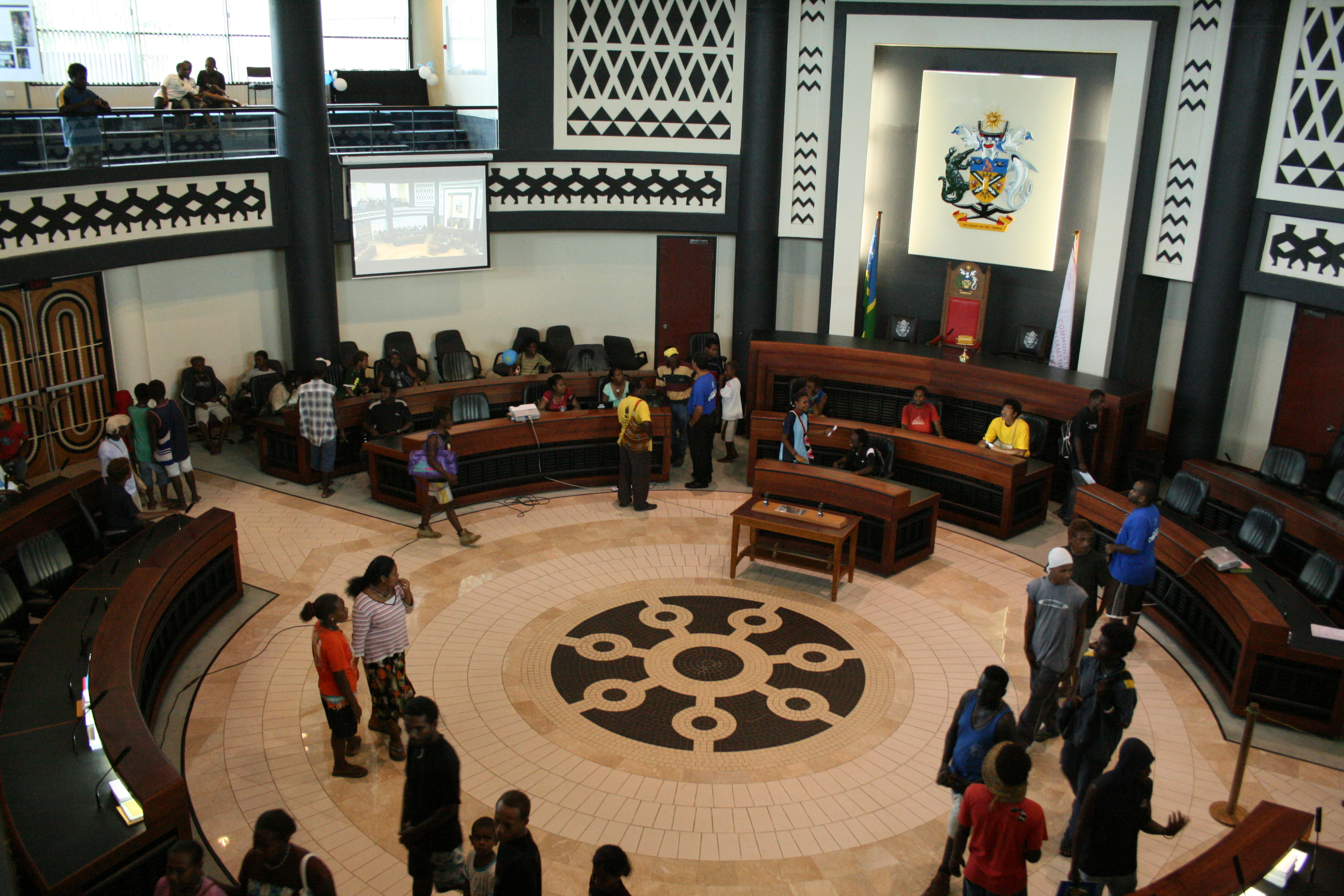
Chamber of the National Parliament

The governor-general must schedule a general election to take place within four months of the dissolution of parliament. The nomination period commences the day after the announcement of the election date and concludes 42 days before the poll. The period for campaigning begins on the day of the proclamation of the polling date and ceases the day before the election. The 50 members of the National Parliament are elected in single-member constituencies using first-past-the-post voting. Candidates are required to be at least 21 years old and resident in the constituency they contest. Disqualifications included holding dual citizenship, being executives or members of the Electoral Commission, having an undischarged bankruptcy, being imprisoned for more than six months, or being under a death sentence. The 2018 electoral act raised the non-refundable nomination fee from SI$2000 to SI$5000 in an attempt to lower the number of candidates, especially "shadow candidates" who ran with the sole purpose of splitting votes to benefit other contestants. The electoral commission argued that with fewer candidates, the victor would gain a more decisive mandate. Candidates running as a member of a registered political party are not permitted to change their affiliation after the confirmation of their nomination; unless they withdraw and file their candidacy again.

=== Voters ===
Voters must be at least 18 years old and hold Solomon Islands citizenship. Individuals disqualified from voting include those that have committed a breach of the electoral law, been declared insane, been imprisoned for more than six months, or were under a death sentence. The 2018 electoral act introduced pre-polling, open to polling staff and police officers that are to provide security for voting centres on election day. In early February 2024, the chief electoral officer of the election commission, Jasper Highwood Anisi, announced that citizens abroad on election day, including seasonal workers in Australia and New Zealand, would be unable to vote as absentee voting would not occur. Around the time of the 2024 election, there were no provisions for overseas voting. Anisi said seasonal workers would possibly be able to vote from abroad in future elections. A total of 420,253 citizens were registered to vote in this election.

=== Election postponement ===
In September 2022, the Sogavare government passed a bill in parliament, delaying the dissolution of the 11th Parliament, which was due to occur on 19 May 2023, by several months to 31 December, to enable the postponement of the 2023 general election to 2024. As Solomon Islands were hosting the Pacific Games in 2023, Sogavare said the election delay was necessary, arguing the country could not afford to hold two major events in the same year as it was still recovering from the effects of the COVID-19 pandemic and the 2021 unrest. Many citizens were reportedly sceptical about the intentions behind the delay, which also raised fears of unrest. A survey conducted by Transparency Solomon Islands from 31 March to 1 April 2022 found that 83% of the 2,178 respondents from the public opposed the deferral. The opposition denounced the postponement as anti-democratic and a "power grab". Opponents also criticised how the government had rushed the bill through parliament, evading the regular procedures that allow for public input. Opposition Leader Wale said the prime minister had "succeeded in making [Solomon Islands] the laughing stock of the region, as a country that is prepared to tamper with its own constitution for a two-week event, against the clear wishes of its people". Sogavare claimed the postponement would not threaten the democratic process and said opponents to the bill lacked evidence that it was undemocratic. An electoral amendment bill passed by parliament on 14 December 2023 arranged for the national election to occur on the same day as the provincial and Honiara City Council elections, marking the first joint elections in Solomon Islands since independence. The only two provinces not to schedule provincial elections for 2024 were Choiseul and Western, which held elections in 2022. On 26 January 2024, the electoral commission scheduled the election for 17 April.

== Schedule ==
Acting Governor-General Patteson Oti confirmed the election date in a formal announcement on 20 February. The following day, the campaign period and the candidate nomination process commenced, with the latter concluding on 6 March. The deadline for candidates wishing to withdraw was set for 8 March by the electoral commission.

Date	Event
31 December 2023	Dissolution of the 11th Parliament
20 February 2024	Proclamation of the election date
21 February 2024	Candidate nominations open
21 February 2024	Campaign period begins
6 March 2024	Candidates nominations close
8 March 2024	Deadline for candidates' withdrawal
15 April 2024	Campaign period ends
16 April 2024	Campaign blackout
17 April 2024	Election day

== Parties and candidates ==
A total of 334 candidates were nominated to contest the election, a similar amount to the 332 in the 2019 election. Only 21 contestants were women, comprising 6% of all candidates, a slight decrease from 26 in 2019. Two incumbent female MPs did not seek re-election. Of all the candidates, 219 were affiliated with one of the 13 contesting parties, while the other 115 ran as independents. The Solomon Islands Democratic Party and the Democratic Alliance Party established an alliance before the election, named the Coalition for Accountability, Reform and Empowerment (CARE). Most parties in Solomon Islands tend to lack a consistent or cohesive ideology, instead focusing on one or more of the following: the policies and personality of the party leader, religion, regional or tribal loyalty, and/or familial ties. This results in the parties being unstable and membership fluid, with members of parliament switching parties being common.

Party	Leader	Candidates	2019 result		Ref(s).
Party	Leader	Candidates	Votes (%)	Seats	Ref(s).
Solomon Islands Democratic Party	Matthew Wale	37	13.64%	8 / 50	
Solomon Islands United Party	Peter Kenilorea Jr.	25	10.43%	2 / 50	
Kadere Party	Martin Housanau	21	9.50%	8 / 50	
Democratic Alliance Party	Rick Houenipwela	10	6.37%	3 / 50	
People's Alliance Party	Nathaniel Waena	15	6.00%	2 / 50	
People First Party	Jimmie Rodgers	7	3.69%	1 / 50	
Solomon Islands Party for Rural Advancement	Gordon Darcy Lilo	17	3.19%	1 / 50	
National Transformation Party		3	1.49%	0 / 50	
Green Party Solomon Islands	Lawrence Makili	2	0.20%	0 / 50	
Ownership, Unity and Responsibility Party	Manasseh Sogavare	43	—N/a	—N/a	
Umi for Change Party	Daniel Suidani	8	—N/a	—N/a	
People's Liberal Democratic Party	Benedict Maesua	30	—N/a	—N/a	
Solomon Islands Progressive Action Party		1	—N/a	—N/a	
Independents	—N/a	115	36.54	21 / 50	

== Campaign ==
Solomon Islands' relations and security pact with China were a significant issue during the campaign. However, many voters were more concerned about domestic matters, including medicine shortages in clinics throughout the country, education, the poor quality of roads, the cost of living and the national debt. Transparency Solomon Islands head Ruth Liloqula criticised the contesting parties for running campaigns "mainly based on foreign policies" and called on them to give more attention to domestic issues.

=== OUR Party ===
On 8 February, the OUR Party launched a manifesto. Party leader and Prime Minister Manasseh Sogavare announced the OUR Party's five most prioritised policies going into the election. The first was preserving social cohesion and national unity to prevent ethnic tensions from rising, as in 2000. Enhancing the nation's legal and governing systems to guarantee public safety was another key priority, as was socio-economic growth; the party pledged to utilise the Australian Infrastructure Financing Facility for the Pacific, the Solomon Islands Infrastructure Program and China's Belt and Road Initiative. The OUR Party's fourth priority was national defence, security and trade; the party sought to preserve relations with Australia and other traditional allies while expanding ties with China as part of a "look north" policy. The fifth key priority was development and land and resources empowerment. During a campaign rally in the Malaitan provincial capital of Auki, Sogavare delivered a speech where he praised the Chinese political system and declared his government's decision to switch diplomatic ties from Taiwan to China to have "put Solomon Islands on the map". Sogavare also claimed that democracy leads to moral decline and same-sex marriage.

=== CARE ===
On 7 February, the Democratic Alliance Party (DAP), led by former Prime Minister Rick Houenipwela and the Solomon Islands Democratic Party (SIDP), led by Opposition Leader Matthew Wale, established the Coalition for Accountability, Reform and Empowerment (CARE) to contest the election. Along with the DAP and SIDP, Umi for Change was also a member party of CARE. The CARE coalition released a manifesto on 14 February; issues it highlighted include job creation, infrastructure investment, implementing free education, decreasing the cost of living and creating 25,000 jobs over a four-year period. CARE pledged to implement a 15% pay rise for public servants and enhance the nation's health services. The coalition also promised to address medicine shortages in health establishments nationwide and to ease the overburdened National Referral Hospital in Honiara by funnelling more resources into provincial hospitals. The coalition's leader, Matthew Wale, criticised the Parliamentary Entitlement Commission (PEC), which oversees the entitlements of parliamentarians, for its plans to implement a pay increase for members of parliament. Pointing to issues such as the struggling economy, the healthcare crisis and the poor quality of roads nationwide, Wale described PEC's decision as a "slap in the face" to Solomon Islanders and announced CARE's intention to replace the PEC with a High Salaries Commission; intending to monitor the salaries of public servants and provide more accountability and transparency. Regarding foreign policy, Wale announced that CARE would maintain a balanced engagement with foreign countries, including China and the United States. Wale stressed the coalition would ultimately prioritise the national interests of Solomon Islands and ensure that consultation with the public would occur before making foreign policy decisions.

==== Umi for Change ====
The then-premier of Malaita Province, Daniel Suidani, formed the Umi for Change Party (U4C) in 2022. Suidani, a vocal critic of the Sogavare government's switch of diplomatic recognition from Taiwan to China and its expansion of ties with the latter, was ousted as premier in 2023 after losing a no-confidence vote, allegedly due to his opposition to the switch. Suidani explained that U4C is a successor to the Malaita Alliance for Rural Advancement government, which he led as premier of Malaita. The Political Parties Commission approved U4C's registration on 9 January 2024; the party subsequently launched a manifesto. One of U4C's key policies included revoking the absolute legal immunity that public officials enjoy. Suidani said this policy was necessary, citing numerous officials allegedly "hiding behind the law" and "making reckless decisions on behalf of the state". The party also pledged to address gender inequality and focus on youth-related issues; U4C aimed to establish an education program on employment to decrease youth unemployment.

=== Kadere Party ===
The Kadere Party focused on governance and economic transformation. General Secretary Martin Housanau announced the party would focus on shifting Solomon Islands' economy away from raw material production and into a value-adding economy as part of an industrialisation redirection. The Party also advocated for land law reform; Housanau claimed land issues were the most prominent obstacles to economic development and argued: "There are three factors of production in the economy, these are, capital, labour and land if any of these three factors is absent, the economy will become stagnant and decline".

=== SIPRA ===
The Solomon Islands Party for Rural Advancement (SIPRA), led by former Prime Minister Gordon Darcy Lilo, pledged to provide additional resources to assist the anti-corruption commission. Lilo claimed that despite the passage of an anti-corruption act, the government had taken little action in combatting corruption and suggested the anti-corruption commission was under-resourced. The party also promised to assist small and medium-sized businesses nationwide and invest in the agricultural, tourism and fisheries sectors. Viewing small and medium businesses as key to economic recovery and growth, Lilo cited the roles these businesses have played in numerous Asian countries. Like the UP and CARE, SIPRA called for a review of the security pact with China.

=== United Party ===
The Solomon Islands United Party (UP) launched its campaign on 7 March. A core aspect of the UP's manifesto was unity in diversity; the party advocated for developing a "real national identity" whilst preserving the ethnically diverse nation's numerous cultural identities. Party leader Peter Kenilorea Jr., son of the nation's first prime minister, Peter Kenilorea, announced the UP would re-establish ties with Taiwan while maintaining relations with China and reviewing China's security deal. The party also sought to preserve relations with traditional development partners, although Kenilorea warned that Solomon Islands should not hold them as the country's sole saviours. The UP called for a diversification of the economy and warned that the country's reliance on limited income streams, especially logging exports, left Solomon Islands vulnerable to external economic crises. Addressing issues regarding critical infrastructure was another priority for the party, particularly the poor state of the roads and bridges.

== Allegations of foreign interference ==
A week before the election, Russia's state-owned Sputnik news agency published an article featuring anonymous claims that the United States and USAID were planning an "electoral coup" in Solomon Islands, which were repeated by the Chinese Communist Party newspaper Global Times. In response, US Ambassador Ann M. Yastishock dismissed the allegations as "blatantly misleading claims about the United States' engagement in the region."

== Logistics ==
In September 2022, the Australian government proposed to assist in funding the general elections. The DCGA government initially criticised the offer and accused the Australian government of foreign interference, alleging they disclosed the offer occurred when parliament debated delaying the general election to influence the opposition. Opposition MP Peter Kenilorea Jr. denounced the DCGA government's response as "extremely unhelpful" and claimed it was evidence of Sogavare attempting to hold onto power. Australian Foreign Minister Penny Wong denied the allegation and pointed to Australia having supported previous elections in the Solomon Islands. Once parliament approved the postponement, Sogavare announced that the government would accept Canberra's offer. The Solomon Islands government allocated approximately SI$40 million to fund the national, provincial and Honiara City Council elections. The Australian government contributed SI$55 million, while the New Zealand government provided SI$35 million. The overall budget was SI$130 million.

On 25 March 2024, New Zealand announced that it would deploy the Royal New Zealand Navy vessel HMNZS Canterbury to transport two helicopters and crew, along with command and maintenance personnel, to the Solomon Islands as part of a NZ$10.8 million ($6.48 million) support program for the Solomon Islands Electoral Commission agreed upon in January that would help transport election officers and materials across the archipelago. In addition to the New Zealand personnel, police officers and soldiers from Australia, Fiji, and Papua New Guinea were also deployed to assist the Royal Solomon Islands Police Force in providing security. Chinese police would help with training officers.

== Conduct ==
Pre-polling was held on 5 April in Honiara for electoral officials and police officers providing security for polling stations on election day. On 8 April, Home Affairs Minister Christopher Laore announced that election day would be a public holiday to ensure a smoother electoral process. Laore also declared that a ban on the sale of liquor would be in place from 16 to 26 April, mandating the closure of liquor shops, nightclubs and bars during this period, except for licensed restaurants and hotels. The ban was later extended to 15 May on account of the prime minister's election and the formation of a new government. An emergency was declared at the country's main hospital due to shortages of staff who went to vote.

On election day, polling stations were open from 7:00 to 16:00. Voters waiting in line at closing time were still allowed to vote. More than 1,000 polling stations were opened nationwide, while around 6,780 election officials were involved, which was twice that of 2019 as the parliamentary election also coincided with elections for eight out of ten provincial assemblies and the Honiara City Council for the first time. Voting was reportedly peaceful and went without violence. Counting of ballots began on 18 April.

== Results ==
On 24 April, the chair of the Solomon Islands Electoral Commission (SIEC), Teasi Sanga, officially declared the election concluded. Final results released showed that no party gained a majority in Parliament, prompting negotiations to form a governing coalition. Prime Minister Sogavare's OUR party attained a plurality of 15 of the chamber's 50 seats, however, 18 of the party's incumbent MPs lost their seats, including Police Minister Anthony Veke, and no newcomers from the party were elected. The CARE coalition secured 13 seats, and the UP won six (with one member elected as an independent aligning with them after the elections, increasing the party's seat count to seven). The remaining seats went to smaller parties and independents. Sogavare himself was narrowly re-elected in his seat of East Choiseul and claimed the United States had attempted to unseat him. Three women were elected; one, Freda Soria Comua, was an incumbent, while the other two were newcomers.

Thirty-nine pre-poll ballot papers from three constituencies in Isabel Province were reportedly not counted during the election counting process. Chief Electoral Officer Jasper Highwood Anisi said that a review on the election would be completed.

Party	Votes	%	Seats	+/–
Ownership, Unity and Responsibility Party	83,280	24.07	15	New
Solomon Islands Democratic Party	66,808	19.31	11	+3
Solomon Islands United Party	46,662	13.48	6	+4
Kadere Party	16,906	4.89	1	–7
Solomon Islands Party for Rural Advancement	15,735	4.55	1	0
People First Party	11,045	3.19	3	+2
Umi for Change Party	10,389	3.00	1	New
People's Liberal Democratic Party	6,034	1.74	0	New
People's Alliance Party	5,593	1.62	0	–2
Democratic Alliance Party	5,515	1.59	1	–2
National Transformation Party	1,116	0.32	0	0
Green Party Solomon Islands	893	0.26	0	0
Solomon Islands Progressive Action Party	349	0.10	0	New
Independents	75,713	21.88	11	–10
Total	346,038	100.00	50	0
Valid votes	346,038	99.76		
Invalid/blank votes	844	0.24		
Total votes	346,882	100.00		
Registered voters/turnout	420,253	82.54		
Source: SIEC, SIBC, Solomon Islands Gazette

=== By constituency ===
Results by constituency
Constituency	Electorate	Candidate	Party	Votes	%	Notes
Aoke/Langalanga	8,193	Matthew Wale	Solomon Islands Democratic Party	4,314	66.04	Re-elected
Aoke/Langalanga	8,193	David Filia	Ownership, Unity and Responsibility Party	1,348	20.64	
Aoke/Langalanga	8,193	Vincent Talauburi Anisi	Kadere Party	488	7.47	
Aoke/Langalanga	8,193	Peter Obadiah Koti	People's Liberal Democratic Party	257	3.93	
Aoke/Langalanga	8,193	Joseph Waleanisia	Solomon Islands United Party	108	1.65	
Aoke/Langalanga	8,193	Rejected votes		17	0.26	
Baegu/Asifola	9,151	Makario Tagini	Ownership, Unity and Responsibility Party	2,391	37.32	Re-elected
Baegu/Asifola	9,151	Celsus Talifilu	Umi for Change Party	2,147	33.51	
Baegu/Asifola	9,151	Douglas Buga	Solomon Islands Party for Rural Advancement	1,009	15.75	
Baegu/Asifola	9,151	Lionel Kakai	Independent	513	8.01	
Baegu/Asifola	9,151	Rexford Macau Kouto	Independent	334	5.21	
Baegu/Asifola	9,151	Rejected votes		13	0.20	
Central Guadalcanal	9,206	Peter Shannel Agovaka	Ownership, Unity and Responsibility Party	3,454	43.03	Re-elected
Central Guadalcanal	9,206	Jeromy Manengelea Rex	Independent	1,592	19.83	
Central Guadalcanal	9,206	Denson Denni	Kadere Party	1,381	17.20	
Central Guadalcanal	9,206	Celestin Seri	Solomon Islands Democratic Party	1,224	15.25	
Central Guadalcanal	9,206	Amaziah Keith Rubo	Solomon Islands United Party	243	3.03	
Central Guadalcanal	9,206	Mivardo Tuanikebu	People's Liberal Democratic Party	65	0.81	
Central Guadalcanal	9,206	Andrew Nihopara	Independent	49	0.61	
Central Guadalcanal	9,206	Nollen Cornelius Leni	Independent	13	0.16	
Central Guadalcanal	9,206	Rejected votes		6	0.07	
Central Honiara	18,159	Gordon Darcy Lilo	Solomon Islands Party for Rural Advancement	8,223	63.14	Elected
Central Honiara	18,159	Alfred Efona	Solomon Islands United Party	3,632	27.89	Unseated
Central Honiara	18,159	Francis Idu	Ownership, Unity and Responsibility Party	669	5.14	
Central Honiara	18,159	Afu Billy	People First Party	321	2.46	
Central Honiara	18,159	Nelson Kile	People's Alliance Party	46	0.35	
Central Honiara	18,159	Rose Annie Anilabata	People's Liberal Democratic Party	42	0.32	
Central Honiara	18,159	Eddie Hoasi	Independent	15	0.12	
Central Honiara	18,159	Rex Noli Dawea	Independent	13	0.10	
Central Honiara	18,159	Alick Collin	Independent	7	0.05	
Central Honiara	18,159	Rejected votes		55	0.42	
Central Kwara'ae	12,932	Ricky Fuo'o	Solomon Islands United Party	5,208	47.74	Elected
Central Kwara'ae	12,932	Jackson Fiulaua	Ownership, Unity and Responsibility Party	1,831	16.78	Unseated
Central Kwara'ae	12,932	Hamilton Young Wate	Independent	1,537	14.09	
Central Kwara'ae	12,932	Billy Fito'o	Solomon Islands Democratic Party	1,493	13.69	
Central Kwara'ae	12,932	Mahlon Muala	People's Alliance Party	378	3.47	
Central Kwara'ae	12,932	Sammy Maeaku Misi	Solomon Islands Party for Rural Advancement	184	1.69	
Central Kwara'ae	12,932	Peter Mae	Democratic Alliance Party	94	0.86	
Central Kwara'ae	12,932	John Talu	Independent	88	0.81	
Central Kwara'ae	12,932	Samuel Lamani	People's Liberal Democratic Party	55	0.50	
Central Kwara'ae	12,932	James Lagwai	Umi for Change Party	14	0.13	
Central Kwara'ae	12,932	Rejected votes		27	0.25	
Central Makira	6,667	Nestor Ghiro	Ownership, Unity and Responsibility Party	2,823	51.28	Re-elected
Central Makira	6,667	Henson Makoani	Solomon Islands Democratic Party	1,215	22.07	
Central Makira	6,667	Alick Pinihimae	Independent	1,147	20.84	
Central Makira	6,667	Harold Parisuri	Solomon Islands United Party	155	2.82	
Central Makira	6,667	Gwendolyn Masuguria	People's Liberal Democratic Party	108	1.96	
Central Makira	6,667	Jerry Muaki	Independent	42	0.76	
Central Makira	6,667	Rejected votes		15	0.27	
East ꞌAreꞌare	7,430	Peter Kenilorea Jr.	Solomon Islands United Party	4,139	66.37	Re-elected
East ꞌAreꞌare	7,430	Andrew Manepora	Kadere Party	2,055	32.95	
East ꞌAreꞌare	7,430	Edward Huitarau	People's Liberal Democratic Party	30	0.48	
East ꞌAreꞌare	7,430	Rejected votes		12	0.19	
East Central Guadalcanal	8,742	Alfred Rimah	Solomon Islands Democratic Party	2,741	34.86	Elected
East Central Guadalcanal	8,742	Ishmael Avui	Ownership, Unity and Responsibility Party	2,516	32.00	Unseated
East Central Guadalcanal	8,742	Hudson Gemalli Molia	People's Liberal Democratic Party	1,398	17.78	
East Central Guadalcanal	8,742	Reuben Tovutovu	Solomon Islands Party for Rural Advancement	720	9.16	
East Central Guadalcanal	8,742	Selwyn Kole Manetarai	Independent	232	2.95	
East Central Guadalcanal	8,742	Matthew Ghavea Betile	Independent	104	1.32	
East Central Guadalcanal	8,742	Lionel Vuthia	Independent	68	0.86	
East Central Guadalcanal	8,742	Francis Oto	Independent	44	0.56	
East Central Guadalcanal	8,742	Gordon Tapalia	Independent	9	0.11	
East Central Guadalcanal	8,742	Rejected votes		30	0.38	
East Choiseul	4,328	Manasseh Sogavare	Ownership, Unity and Responsibility Party	1,808	48.80	Re-elected
East Choiseul	4,328	David Qurusu	Solomon Islands United Party	1,549	41.81	
East Choiseul	4,328	Davis Soleboe Pitamama	Independent	219	5.91	
East Choiseul	4,328	James Ron Kaboke	Solomon Islands Democratic Party	97	2.62	
East Choiseul	4,328	Moreen Dusaru	People's Liberal Democratic Party	30	0.81	
East Choiseul	4,328	Rejected votes		2	0.05	
East Guadalcanal	9,127	Bradley Tovosia	Ownership, Unity and Responsibility Party	3,551	43.27	Re-elected
East Guadalcanal	9,127	Jessey Koli	Solomon Islands Democratic Party	1,829	22.29	
East Guadalcanal	9,127	Maxsweeney Laxy Kekevera	Umi for Change Party	1,099	13.39	
East Guadalcanal	9,127	Andrew Dormans Tahisihaka	Kadere Party	606	7.38	
East Guadalcanal	9,127	Dominic Buataigha	People's Alliance Party	443	5.40	
East Guadalcanal	9,127	Sampson Tahuniara	Solomon Islands Party for Rural Advancement	214	2.61	
East Guadalcanal	9,127	Jack Koti	Solomon Islands United Party	198	2.41	
East Guadalcanal	9,127	Abraham Labakonia Faisi	People's Liberal Democratic Party	185	2.25	
East Guadalcanal	9,127	Rejected votes		81	0.99	
East Honiara	16,671	Morris Toiraena	Solomon Islands United Party	6,666	56.11	Elected
East Honiara	16,671	Douglas Ete	Solomon Islands Democratic Party	1,665	14.02	Unseated
East Honiara	16,671	Peter Bubulu	Kadere Party	1,181	9.94	
East Honiara	16,671	Leonard Solomon Saii	Ownership, Unity and Responsibility Party	907	7.63	
East Honiara	16,671	Johnny Jay Tasa	Independent	890	7.49	
East Honiara	16,671	Redley Raramo	People's Alliance Party	320	2.69	
East Honiara	16,671	Floyd Dausabea	Independent	178	1.50	
East Honiara	16,671	Bendick Maesua	People's Liberal Democratic Party	39	0.33	
East Honiara	16,671	Rejected votes		34	0.29	
East Kwaio	8,659	Stanley Festus Sofu	Ownership, Unity and Responsibility Party	1,688	23.38	Re-elected
East Kwaio	8,659	Alfred Solomon Sasako	Kadere Party	1,520	21.05	
East Kwaio	8,659	Simon Baete	Solomon Islands United Party	1,385	19.18	
East Kwaio	8,659	Nelson Lenty	Solomon Islands Democratic Party	1,075	14.89	
East Kwaio	8,659	Nelson Kenita Ari	Solomon Islands Party for Rural Advancement	660	9.14	
East Kwaio	8,659	Wesley Rubea Alabeti	People First Party	411	5.69	
East Kwaio	8,659	George Fika Albert	National Transformation Party	324	4.49	
East Kwaio	8,659	Danny Fafaka	People's Alliance Party	101	1.40	
East Kwaio	8,659	Elison Gauwane	Democratic Alliance Party	36	0.50	
East Kwaio	8,659	Graig Irenson	People's Liberal Democratic Party	10	0.14	
East Kwaio	8,659	Rejected votes		11	0.15	
East Makira	10,299	Derek Wasi	Independent	1,187	13.44	Elected
East Makira	10,299	Stanley Dick Pirione	Independent	1,050	11.89	
East Makira	10,299	Lillian Maefai	Ownership, Unity and Responsibility Party	891	10.09	Unseated
East Makira	10,299	Alfred Giro	Solomon Islands Democratic Party	885	10.02	
East Makira	10,299	Jack Martin	Independent	746	8.45	
East Makira	10,299	Aquila Kirito Karani	Independent	714	8.09	
East Makira	10,299	Freddie Qwasa	People's Liberal Democratic Party	707	8.01	
East Makira	10,299	Carl Lloyd Tehe	Independent	535	6.06	
East Makira	10,299	John Narcissus Pasimae	Independent	485	5.49	
East Makira	10,299	Everlyn Kahia	Solomon Islands United Party	351	3.97	
East Makira	10,299	John Stevenson Piringiasau	Solomon Islands Progressive Action Party	349	3.95	
East Makira	10,299	Frank Wetara	People's Alliance Party	330	3.74	
East Makira	10,299	Noel Kinika	Democratic Alliance Party	185	2.09	
East Makira	10,299	Andrew Max Higa	Independent	161	1.82	
East Makira	10,299	Nemesio Haga Kinika	Kadere Party	134	1.52	
East Makira	10,299	Fred Jones Warereau	Solomon Islands Party for Rural Advancement	99	1.12	
East Makira	10,299	Jimmy Tywo	Independent	10	0.11	
East Makira	10,299	Rejected votes		12	0.14	
East Malaita	7,388	Manasseh Maelanga	Ownership, Unity and Responsibility Party	2,844	47.09	Re-elected
East Malaita	7,388	Fredrick Faabasua Manibili	Solomon Islands United Party	1,472	24.37	
East Malaita	7,388	William Baefua	Democratic Alliance Party	1,008	16.69	
East Malaita	7,388	George Molakah Atoa	Solomon Islands Party for Rural Advancement	679	11.24	
East Malaita	7,388	Benedict Idu	Independent	19	0.31	
East Malaita	7,388	Rejected votes		18	0.30	
Fataleka	8,769	Annex Ramofafia	Ownership, Unity and Responsibility Party	4,869	65.52	Re-elected
Fataleka	8,769	Moffat Ramofafia	Umi for Change Party	1,772	23.85	
Fataleka	8,769	Steve William Abana	Independent	735	9.89	
Fataleka	8,769	Robert Iamaea	People's Liberal Democratic Party	22	0.30	
Fataleka	8,769	John Itea	Independent	21	0.28	
Fataleka	8,769	Rejected votes		12	0.16	
Gao/Bugotu	6,794	Trevor Hedley Mahaga	Independent	2,861	49.58	Elected
Gao/Bugotu	6,794	Samuel Manetoali	Ownership, Unity and Responsibility Party	2,848	49.36	Unseated
Gao/Bugotu	6,794	George Bogese	Democratic Alliance Party	44	0.76	
Gao/Bugotu	6,794	Rejected votes		17	0.29	
Gizo/Kolombangara	10,407	Jimson Fiau Tanangada	Ownership, Unity and Responsibility Party	3,407	42.05	Elected
Gizo/Kolombangara	10,407	Peter Soqoilo	Solomon Islands Democratic Party	3,154	38.93	
Gizo/Kolombangara	10,407	Dekon Trevor Kuong	Independent	501	6.18	
Gizo/Kolombangara	10,407	Ronald Philips Dive	Solomon Islands Party for Rural Advancement	372	4.59	
Gizo/Kolombangara	10,407	Kenneth David Bulehite	People's Liberal Democratic Party	236	2.91	
Gizo/Kolombangara	10,407	Vaeno Wayne Vigulu	Independent	208	2.57	
Gizo/Kolombangara	10,407	Samson Maena Piasi	People's Alliance Party	141	1.74	
Gizo/Kolombangara	10,407	Clement Peter Tito	Independent	80	0.99	
Gizo/Kolombangara	10,407	Rejected votes		3	0.04	
Hograno/Kia/Havulei	8,235	Jeremiah Manele	Ownership, Unity and Responsibility Party	4,280	59.21	Re-elected
Hograno/Kia/Havulei	8,235	Selwyn Riumana	Independent	2,167	29.98	
Hograno/Kia/Havulei	8,235	Derek Mane	National Transformation Party	767	10.61	
Hograno/Kia/Havulei	8,235	Rejected votes		15	0.21	
Lau/Mbaelelea	16,177	Ben Maenu	Independent	3,108	23.81	Elected
Lau/Mbaelelea	16,177	Augustine Auga	Ownership, Unity and Responsibility Party	3,007	23.04	Unseated
Lau/Mbaelelea	16,177	Timothy Raurau	Independent	1,841	14.10	
Lau/Mbaelelea	16,177	John Aruifiu Augustine	Umi for Change Party	1,114	8.53	
Lau/Mbaelelea	16,177	Paul Wanesiofa Erekona	Solomon Islands Democratic Party	1,081	8.28	
Lau/Mbaelelea	16,177	Harry Philip	Kadere Party	1,037	7.94	
Lau/Mbaelelea	16,177	Kemuel Mauta	Independent	792	6.07	
Lau/Mbaelelea	16,177	Frank Konairara Tabai	Independent	420	3.22	
Lau/Mbaelelea	16,177	Barnabas Boe	Independent	295	2.26	
Lau/Mbaelelea	16,177	Abel Diudy	People's Liberal Democratic Party	148	1.13	
Lau/Mbaelelea	16,177	Frederick Talo	Independent	131	1.00	
Lau/Mbaelelea	16,177	Judson Leafasia	Independent	42	0.32	
Lau/Mbaelelea	16,177	Rejected votes		37	0.28	
Malaita Outer Islands	3,353	Polycarp Paea	Independent	1,657	58.35	Elected
Malaita Outer Islands	3,353	Martin Mokolo Kealoe	Ownership, Unity and Responsibility Party	1,003	35.32	Unseated
Malaita Outer Islands	3,353	Michael Kikiolo	Independent	93	3.27	
Malaita Outer Islands	3,353	Florrie Kealau Alalo	Green Party Solomon Islands	58	2.04	
Malaita Outer Islands	3,353	Mathias Ma'ai	Independent	20	0.70	
Malaita Outer Islands	3,353	Rejected votes		9	0.32	
Maringe/Kokota	6,891	Cathy Nori	Independent	1,940	32.50	Elected
Maringe/Kokota	6,891	Culwick Togamana	Ownership, Unity and Responsibility Party	1,834	30.72	Unseated
Maringe/Kokota	6,891	Cecil Togamae	Solomon Islands Party for Rural Advancement	1,396	23.38	
Maringe/Kokota	6,891	Khalegedi Togamae	Independent	737	12.35	
Maringe/Kokota	6,891	Dickson Goramana	Independent	48	0.80	
Maringe/Kokota	6,891	Rejected votes		15	0.25	
Marovo	10,623	Rebi Amoi	People First Party	5,515	65.95	Re-elected
Marovo	10,623	Jason Rini	Solomon Islands Democratic Party	2,616	31.28	
Marovo	10,623	Sisifa Louis Mua	Independent	81	0.97	
Marovo	10,623	Jamesly Hedi	People's Liberal Democratic Party	60	0.72	
Marovo	10,623	Calvin Charles	Independent	44	0.53	
Marovo	10,623	Barry Samson	People's Alliance Party	16	0.19	
Marovo	10,623	Eric Manahan Hitu	Kadere Party	15	0.18	
Marovo	10,623	Nixon Dennie	Independent	6	0.07	
Marovo	10,623	Rejected votes		9	0.11	
Nggela	12,926	Choylin Yim Douglas	Independent	4,255	35.83	Elected
Nggela	12,926	Gabriel Salini	Solomon Islands Democratic Party	2,699	22.73	
Nggela	12,926	Bartholomew Parapolo	Ownership, Unity and Responsibility Party	2,440	20.55	Unseated
Nggela	12,926	James Bosamata	Independent	1,296	10.91	
Nggela	12,926	Irene Kaumi Vaukei	Independent	699	5.89	
Nggela	12,926	Joseph Manelugu	People's Liberal Democratic Party	235	1.98	
Nggela	12,926	Daniel Ashwin Tobaniaula	Kadere Party	201	1.69	
Nggela	12,926	Rejected votes		50	0.42	
North East Guadalcanal	8,257	Jaimie Vokia	Kadere Party	2,468	32.54	Elected
North East Guadalcanal	8,257	Bradley Lenga	Solomon Islands Democratic Party	2,428	32.01	
North East Guadalcanal	8,257	Derek Sikua	Independent	2,199	29.00	
North East Guadalcanal	8,257	Carlrick Saronga	Independent	230	3.03	
North East Guadalcanal	8,257	Henry Saea	Ownership, Unity and Responsibility Party	204	2.69	
North East Guadalcanal	8,257	Jerry Vota	People's Liberal Democratic Party	43	0.57	
North East Guadalcanal	8,257	Rejected votes		12	0.16	
North Guadalcanal	7,128	Paul Popora Bosawai	Independent	2,607	41.07	Elected
North Guadalcanal	7,128	Samson Maneka	Ownership, Unity and Responsibility Party	2,397	37.77	Unseated
North Guadalcanal	7,128	Martin Sopage	Solomon Islands Democratic Party	889	14.01	
North Guadalcanal	7,128	Moses Karuku	Independent	197	3.10	
North Guadalcanal	7,128	Benedict Parataboa Garimane	Independent	141	2.22	
North Guadalcanal	7,128	Daniel Vedar Buto	Independent	71	1.12	
North Guadalcanal	7,128	Annah Vera Vota	People's Liberal Democratic Party	22	0.35	
North Guadalcanal	7,128	Donn Tolia	Independent	12	0.19	
North Guadalcanal	7,128	Rejected votes		11	0.17	
North Malaita	11,659	Daniel Suilea Waneoroa	Umi for Change Party	2,538	26.24	Elected
North Malaita	11,659	Jimmy Lusibaea	Independent	2,259	23.35	
North Malaita	11,659	Patteson Saeni	Solomon Islands United Party	1,956	20.22	
North Malaita	11,659	Senley Levi Filualea	Ownership, Unity and Responsibility Party	1,632	16.87	Unseated
North Malaita	11,659	Jack Waneoroa	Solomon Islands Party for Rural Advancement	883	9.13	
North Malaita	11,659	Robert Riimana Lauomea	Solomon Islands Democratic Party	269	2.78	
North Malaita	11,659	Elton Osiagalo	Independent	107	1.11	
North Malaita	11,659	Rejected votes		29	0.30	
North New Georgia	3,839	John Dean Kuku	Solomon Islands Democratic Party	2,078	67.78	Re-elected
North New Georgia	3,839	Nanette Anne Tutua	Independent	982	32.03	
North New Georgia	3,839	Rejected votes		6	0.20	
North Vella Lavella	5,250	Clezy Rore	Ownership, Unity and Responsibility Party	2,656	59.82	Re-elected
North Vella Lavella	5,250	Alex Gina Kivolyn	Independent	1,587	35.74	
North Vella Lavella	5,250	Gregory Pakovari Bennett	Solomon Islands Democratic Party	158	3.56	
North Vella Lavella	5,250	Anthony Ele	Kadere Party	19	0.43	
North Vella Lavella	5,250	Thornley Hite	Independent	19	0.43	
North Vella Lavella	5,250	Rejected votes		1	0.02	
North West Choiseul	8,172	Harry Kuma	Ownership, Unity and Responsibility Party	3,377	48.39	Re-elected
North West Choiseul	8,172	Alick Fleming Pukakoqoro	Independent	2,824	40.46	
North West Choiseul	8,172	Hensol Siribau Kiko	Independent	377	5.40	
North West Choiseul	8,172	Watson Pitasua Qoloni	Umi for Change Party	206	2.95	
North West Choiseul	8,172	Paul Kengabatu	People's Liberal Democratic Party	173	2.48	
North West Choiseul	8,172	Jovita Pupubatu	Solomon Islands Democratic Party	16	0.23	
North West Choiseul	8,172	Rejected votes		6	0.09	
North West Guadalcanal	8,468	Francis Sade	Solomon Islands United Party	3,221	45.34	Elected
North West Guadalcanal	8,468	Bodo Dettke	Solomon Islands Democratic Party	2,714	38.20	Unseated
North West Guadalcanal	8,468	Simon Chottu	Ownership, Unity and Responsibility Party	409	5.76	
North West Guadalcanal	8,468	John Espangne	Kadere Party	320	4.50	
North West Guadalcanal	8,468	Kasiano Kere	People's Alliance Party	239	3.36	
North West Guadalcanal	8,468	Andrew Leonard Mua	Independent	174	2.45	
North West Guadalcanal	8,468	Rejected votes		27	0.38	
Ranongga/Simbo	7,221	Wayne Ghemu	People First Party	2,060	32.73	Elected
Ranongga/Simbo	7,221	Charles Sigoto	Solomon Islands Democratic Party	1,995	31.70	Unseated
Ranongga/Simbo	7,221	Ralph Joseph	Ownership, Unity and Responsibility Party	1,743	27.69	
Ranongga/Simbo	7,221	Solomon Sammy	Independent	321	5.10	
Ranongga/Simbo	7,221	Jimmy Stanley	Independent	173	2.75	
Ranongga/Simbo	7,221	Rejected votes		2	0.03	
Rennell/Bellona	4,111	John Tuhaika	Independent	878	25.54	Elected
Rennell/Bellona	4,111	Simon Tepuke	Independent	596	17.34	
Rennell/Bellona	4,111	Tautai Agikimu'a Kaitu'u	Ownership, Unity and Responsibility Party	572	16.64	Unseated
Rennell/Bellona	4,111	Jefter Tuhagenga	Solomon Islands Democratic Party	430	12.51	
Rennell/Bellona	4,111	Seth Gukuna	Independent	382	11.11	
Rennell/Bellona	4,111	Jerry Maiki Tengemoana	Democratic Alliance Party	370	10.76	
Rennell/Bellona	4,111	William Saungongo Sanga	Solomon Islands United Party	106	3.08	
Rennell/Bellona	4,111	Sammy Namona Kaipua	Independent	103	3.00	
Rennell/Bellona	4,111	Rejected votes		1	0.03	
Russells/Savo	8,827	Oliver Salopuka	Solomon Islands Democratic Party	3,135	40.33	Elected
Russells/Savo	8,827	Dickson Mua	Ownership, Unity and Responsibility Party	2,106	27.09	Unseated
Russells/Savo	8,827	Peter Osike	Kadere Party	1,989	25.59	
Russells/Savo	8,827	Mels Melchior Vaka Tuiterangi	Solomon Islands United Party	324	4.17	
Russells/Savo	8,827	Jacob Manegaru	People's Liberal Democratic Party	195	2.51	
Russells/Savo	8,827	Rejected votes		24	0.31	
Shortlands	3,702	Isikeli Vave Jr.	Independent	1,068	34.81	Elected
Shortlands	3,702	Christopher Laore	Ownership, Unity and Responsibility Party	971	31.65	Unseated
Shortlands	3,702	Joseph Gorae	Solomon Islands Democratic Party	683	22.26	
Shortlands	3,702	Silverio Ilaha Lepe	Independent	288	9.39	
Shortlands	3,702	Benedict Teahui	Democratic Alliance Party	57	1.86	
Shortlands	3,702	Ninamo M. Otuana	Independent	1	0.03	
Shortlands	3,702	Rejected votes		0	0.00	
Small Malaita	9,444	Rick Houenipwela	Democratic Alliance Party	2,229	28.62	Re-elected
Small Malaita	9,444	Reginald Sanau Ngāti	Independent	1,242	15.95	
Small Malaita	9,444	William Haomae	Ownership, Unity and Responsibility Party	1,068	13.72	
Small Malaita	9,444	Solomon Luimae	Solomon Islands United Party	980	12.59	
Small Malaita	9,444	Frank Sade Bilaupaine	Solomon Islands Party for Rural Advancement	839	10.77	
Small Malaita	9,444	Barnabas Upwe	Kadere Party	566	7.27	
Small Malaita	9,444	John Patteson Ngalihesi	People's Alliance Party	279	3.58	
Small Malaita	9,444	George Horoasia	Independent	235	3.02	
Small Malaita	9,444	Michael Konia	Independent	183	2.35	
Small Malaita	9,444	Steven Maitani	Independent	137	1.76	
Small Malaita	9,444	Rejected votes		29	0.37	
South Choiseul	8,316	Tozen Leokana	Independent	2,442	35.28	Elected
South Choiseul	8,316	Rictor Luaboe	Independent	2,048	29.59	
South Choiseul	8,316	Sammy Galo	Ownership, Unity and Responsibility Party	1,996	28.84	Unseated
South Choiseul	8,316	Jerrick Vozoto	Independent	191	2.76	
South Choiseul	8,316	Gidding Qiqo	People's Liberal Democratic Party	156	2.25	
South Choiseul	8,316	Gregory Wilson Pitabose	Independent	77	1.11	
South Choiseul	8,316	Collish Leketo Tutua	Independent	9	0.13	
South Choiseul	8,316	Rejected votes		3	0.04	
South Guadalcanal	7,720	Rollen Seleso	Ownership, Unity and Responsibility Party	2,588	39.86	Re-elected
South Guadalcanal	7,720	David Day Pacha	Solomon Islands Democratic Party	2,253	34.70	
South Guadalcanal	7,720	Jackson Saurongo	Independent	984	15.16	
South Guadalcanal	7,720	Joseph Sangu	Independent	486	7.49	
South Guadalcanal	7,720	Cornelius Vonseu	Independent	110	1.69	
South Guadalcanal	7,720	Leonard Olivera	People's Liberal Democratic Party	55	0.85	
South Guadalcanal	7,720	Rejected votes		16	0.25	
South New Georgia/Rendova/Tetepari	6,219	David Gina	Solomon Islands Democratic Party	1,942	36.96	Elected
South New Georgia/Rendova/Tetepari	6,219	Danny Philip	Ownership, Unity and Responsibility Party	1,365	25.98	Unseated
South New Georgia/Rendova/Tetepari	6,219	John Kari Zama	Independent	903	17.19	
South New Georgia/Rendova/Tetepari	6,219	Elijah Raeva Hoe	Independent	694	13.21	
South New Georgia/Rendova/Tetepari	6,219	Daniel Beto Rove	Independent	137	2.61	
South New Georgia/Rendova/Tetepari	6,219	Alekoti Alevangana	People's Liberal Democratic Party	113	2.15	
South New Georgia/Rendova/Tetepari	6,219	Alex Mendo Meloty	Independent	76	1.45	
South New Georgia/Rendova/Tetepari	6,219	Josephine Noga Kama	People First Party	12	0.23	
South New Georgia/Rendova/Tetepari	6,219	Peterson Boso	Kadere Party	9	0.17	
South New Georgia/Rendova/Tetepari	6,219	Rejected votes		3	0.06	
South Vella La Vella	6,723	Frederick Kologeto	People First Party	1,787	30.38	Re-elected
South Vella La Vella	6,723	Jacob Kwan	Independent	1,207	20.52	
South Vella La Vella	6,723	Alex Lional Qora	Democratic Alliance Party	967	16.44	
South Vella La Vella	6,723	Ronald Ivupitu	Solomon Islands Democratic Party	769	13.07	
South Vella La Vella	6,723	Conrad Rore	Independent	633	10.76	
South Vella La Vella	6,723	Hendrick Kuboto Kaniki	Solomon Islands United Party	519	8.82	
South Vella La Vella	6,723	Rejected votes		0	0.00	
Temotu Nende	6,752	Stephen Kumi	Solomon Islands Democratic Party	2,198	42.95	Elected
Temotu Nende	6,752	Commins Mewa	Ownership, Unity and Responsibility Party	1,344	26.27	Unseated
Temotu Nende	6,752	Patteson Oti	Green Party Solomon Islands	835	16.32	
Temotu Nende	6,752	Frank Bonie Melanoli	People's Liberal Democratic Party	725	14.17	
Temotu Nende	6,752	Rejected votes		15	0.29	
Temotu Pele	5,311	James Bonunga	Solomon Islands Democratic Party	1,788	44.28	Elected
Temotu Pele	5,311	Dudley Kopu	Ownership, Unity and Responsibility Party	1,289	31.92	Unseated
Temotu Pele	5,311	Ellen Tekula Maruarofa	People's Liberal Democratic Party	534	13.22	
Temotu Pele	5,311	Douglas Doli Yee	Independent	392	9.71	
Temotu Pele	5,311	Ben Angoa Jr.	Solomon Islands Party for Rural Advancement	19	0.47	
Temotu Pele	5,311	Eddy Grant Suku	People's Alliance Party	3	0.07	
Temotu Pele	5,311	Rejected votes		13	0.32	
Temotu Vatud	3,379	Freda Soria Comua	Ownership, Unity and Responsibility Party	621	24.20	Re-elected
Temotu Vatud	3,379	Alec Leubwa Bonunga	Independent	509	19.84	
Temotu Vatud	3,379	Kensley Kasoakave Manu	Kadere Party	423	16.48	
Temotu Vatud	3,379	Walter Roto	Solomon Islands United Party	356	13.87	
Temotu Vatud	3,379	Chris Ashley Patty	Solomon Islands Democratic Party	258	10.05	
Temotu Vatud	3,379	Erick Sammy Kalae	Independent	155	6.04	
Temotu Vatud	3,379	Moses Maru Nukufakatonu	Independent	135	5.26	
Temotu Vatud	3,379	Angella Doris Tahani	Solomon Islands Party for Rural Advancement	71	2.77	
Temotu Vatud	3,379	Fisher Rima Rangimalonga	Independent	34	1.33	
Temotu Vatud	3,379	Rejected votes		4	0.16	
Ulawa/Ugi	4,564	Willie Marau	Ownership, Unity and Responsibility Party	1,162	31.19	Re-elected
Ulawa/Ugi	4,564	Stephen Maesiola	People First Party	939	25.20	
Ulawa/Ugi	4,564	George Titiulu	Solomon Islands Democratic Party	687	18.44	
Ulawa/Ugi	4,564	George Takeli	People's Alliance Party	429	11.51	
Ulawa/Ugi	4,564	Davis Maemae	Kadere Party	266	7.14	
Ulawa/Ugi	4,564	Morrison Rata	People's Liberal Democratic Party	93	2.50	
Ulawa/Ugi	4,564	Raphael Oli	Solomon Islands United Party	87	2.33	
Ulawa/Ugi	4,564	Malcolm F. M. Sitana	Independent	32	0.86	
Ulawa/Ugi	4,564	Philip Rincon Matou	National Transformation Party	25	0.67	
Ulawa/Ugi	4,564	Rejected votes		6	0.16	
West ꞌAreꞌare	6,663	John Maneniaru	Solomon Islands Democratic Party	3,047	53.61	Re-elected
West ꞌAreꞌare	6,663	Elizabeth Kausimae	People's Alliance Party	1,599	28.13	
West ꞌAreꞌare	6,663	Paul Wakio	Solomon Islands United Party	565	9.94	
West ꞌAreꞌare	6,663	Peter Chanel Ramohia	Kadere Party	395	6.95	
West ꞌAreꞌare	6,663	Peter Houmaha Susuta	Independent	66	1.16	
West ꞌAreꞌare	6,663	Willie Anihehero Waroka	Ownership, Unity and Responsibility Party	9	0.16	
West ꞌAreꞌare	6,663	Rejected votes		3	0.05	
West Guadalcanal	8,043	Moses Garu	Solomon Islands Democratic Party	3,450	46.62	Elected
West Guadalcanal	8,043	Anthony Veke	Ownership, Unity and Responsibility Party	2,861	38.66	Unseated
West Guadalcanal	8,043	Fred Tavuata	Solomon Islands United Party	409	5.53	
West Guadalcanal	8,043	Edward Hala	People's Alliance Party	402	5.43	
West Guadalcanal	8,043	Lazarus Tavichikai	Independent	192	2.59	
West Guadalcanal	8,043	Emelio Kusu	People's Liberal Democratic Party	43	0.58	
West Guadalcanal	8,043	James Gulu	Solomon Islands Party for Rural Advancement	28	0.38	
West Guadalcanal	8,043	Rejected votes		15	0.20	
West Honiara	13,272	Namson Tran	Independent	5,466	54.86	Re-elected
West Honiara	13,272	Wilson Mamae	Solomon Islands Democratic Party	4,389	44.05	
West Honiara	13,272	Catherine Leta	People's Liberal Democratic Party	72	0.72	
West Honiara	13,272	Rejected votes		36	0.36	
West Kwaio	8,919	Claudius Tei'ifi	Solomon Islands United Party	4,888	67.66	Re-elected
West Kwaio	8,919	Kennedy Aiapu	Kadere Party	1,424	19.71	
West Kwaio	8,919	Joyce Faganaoa Maesua	Independent	874	12.10	
West Kwaio	8,919	Rejected votes		38	0.53	
West Kwara'Ae	9,569	Alfred Tuasulia	Solomon Islands United Party	5,621	71.52	Re-elected
West Kwara'Ae	9,569	Fred Ramoli	Umi for Change Party	1,499	19.07	
West Kwara'Ae	9,569	Clement Koba'a Oikali	Democratic Alliance Party	525	6.68	
West Kwara'Ae	9,569	Sam Lidimani Alasia	Solomon Islands Party for Rural Advancement	191	2.43	
West Kwara'Ae	9,569	Rejected votes		23	0.29	
West Makira	7,634	Rawcliff Manu'ari	Solomon Islands Democratic Party	1,275	20.56	Re-elected
West Makira	7,634	Tommy Mana	Ownership, Unity and Responsibility Party	987	15.91	
West Makira	7,634	Gravis Tahiri	Independent	956	15.41	
West Makira	7,634	Matthew Ha'asuramo Taro	People's Alliance Party	867	13.98	
West Makira	7,634	Lloyd Tahani	Independent	558	9.00	
West Makira	7,634	John Wesley Horatainia	Independent	439	7.08	
West Makira	7,634	Calvin Kenton Taro	Kadere Party	409	6.59	
West Makira	7,634	Clement Muri	Independent	369	5.95	
West Makira	7,634	Ham Oroi Monogari	People's Liberal Democratic Party	183	2.95	
West Makira	7,634	Crispin Dora Fititei	Solomon Islands Party for Rural Advancement	148	2.39	
West Makira	7,634	Paul Marita	Independent	6	0.10	
West Makira	7,634	Rejected votes		5	0.08	
West New Georgia/Vona Vona	9,964	George Temahua	Solomon Islands Democratic Party	3,869	48.46	Elected
West New Georgia/Vona Vona	9,964	Silas Tausinga	Solomon Islands United Party	2,524	31.61	Unseated
West New Georgia/Vona Vona	9,964	Trevor Veo	Ownership, Unity and Responsibility Party	1,514	18.96	
West New Georgia/Vona Vona	9,964	Ben Anikwai	Independent	45	0.56	
West New Georgia/Vona Vona	9,964	Aaron Usa Kama	Independent	11	0.14	
West New Georgia/Vona Vona	9,964	Job Duddley	Independent	5	0.06	
West New Georgia/Vona Vona	9,964	Rejected votes		16	0.20	

=== Local results ===
In Malaita Province, former Premier Daniel Suidani, who was removed from his position following a no-confidence vote in the Provincial Assembly in 2023, was re-elected, while his successor, Martin Fini, lost his seat. A few disturbances were recorded in the province and were blamed on supporters of losing candidates. Three women were elected to the provincial assemblies in Temotu, Malaita, and Isabel, while two women were also elected to the Honiara City Council.

== Aftermath ==
=== Government formation ===
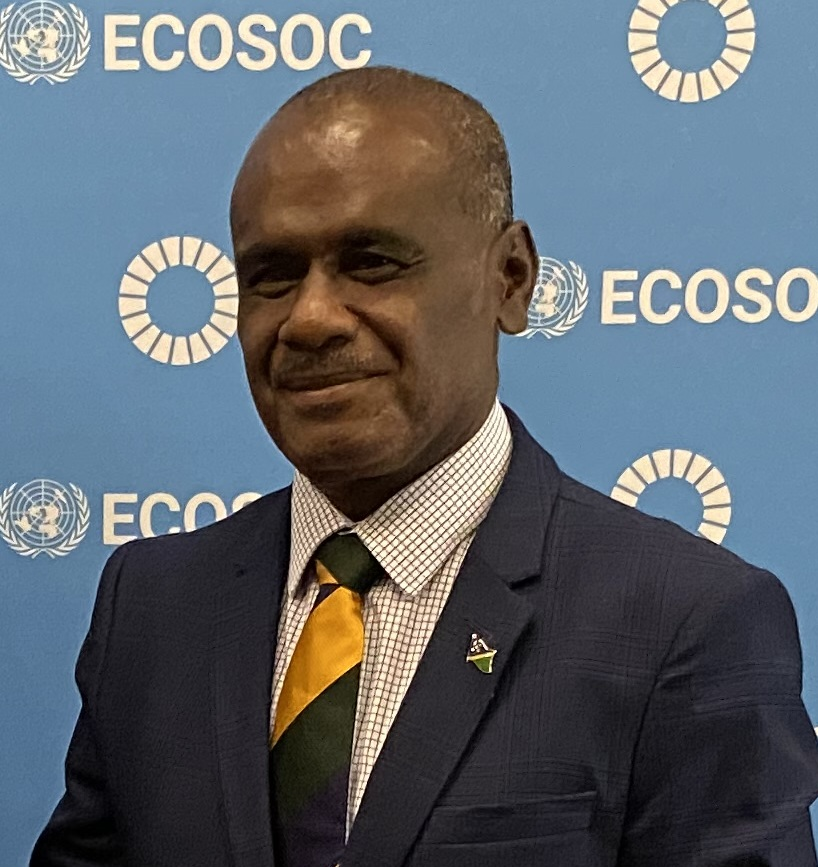
Jeremiah Manele was elected prime minister after his predecessor, Manasseh Sogavare, declined to seek another term

Negotiations to form a government reportedly began the day before the election. Following the election, the OUR Party and the opposition began efforts to win over the ten kingmaker independents. Sogavare claimed the opposition parties faced divisions in who to field for prime minister. CARE coalition Leader Matthew Wale, UP Leader Peter Kenilorea Jr., and former Prime Minister Gordon Darcy Lilo emerged as potential candidates to take on Sogavare for prime minister. On 26 April, Sogavare announced that the OUR Party had renewed an alliance with the People First Party, giving the bloc 18 seats, claiming it had enough support to form a government. However, he did not name other coalition partners. On 27 April, CARE signed a coalition agreement with the UP, increasing the alliance's seat count to 20.

Governor-General David Vunagi announced on 29 April that a parliamentary vote to elect the prime minister would take place on 2 May. The OUR Party and People First Party were later joined by the Kadere Party, forming the Coalition of National Unity and Transformation (later the Government of National Unity and Transformation, GNUT). Shortly before nominations for the prime ministerial election opened, Sogavare announced on 29 April that he would not stand for another term as prime minister and resign as the OUR Party leader, which he said was a "collective decision". The bloc instead nominated Foreign Minister Jeremiah Manele, who also succeeded Sogavare as leader of the OUR Party. The CARE coalition, along with the UP and SIPRA, nominated Matthew Wale for prime minister. Before the prime ministerial election, Manele's coalition claimed to have secured the support of the independents, providing the bloc with 28 seats. Prime ministerial elections in Solomon Islands are often unpredictable, as MPs are not legally barred from switching parties. Another factor is the vast difference in income and benefits between government MPs and the opposition. Ruth Liloqula, the chief executive of Transparency Solomon Islands, claimed many MPs were changing affiliation, motivated by personal and political gain rather than by policies and principles. She highlighted how many of the newly elected independent MPs had campaigned for a change in government, with some unseating OUR Party members, only to join the party's coalition after the election. The elections for prime minister are conducted through a secret ballot. Although it is held in the National Parliament, it is not a parliamentary meeting and is presided over by the governor-general rather than the speaker. Manele won with 31 votes, defeating Wale, who earned 18. There was one abstention. Two members of Wale's bloc, Francis Sade of the UP and Cathy Nori, defected to the GNUT and voted for Manele. During the first session of the 12th Parliament, on 16 May, Patteson Oti was re-elected as speaker, while Sade was elected deputy speaker. Wale assumed another term as opposition leader.

==== New Cabinet ====
Following the election of Manele as prime minister, there were two swearing in ceremonies for the new cabinet. Eleven ministers were sworn in on 4 May, followed by a further nine on 6 May. Sogavare was appointed minister of finance and treasury, while Bradley Tovosia became deputy prime minister. The cabinet lineup was completed on 15 May, when the final minister was sworn in.

Minister	Position	Party
Jeremiah Manele	Prime Minister	OUR Party
Bradley Tovosia	Deputy Prime Minister, Minister for Mines, Energy and Rural Electrification	OUR Party
Manasseh Sogavare	Minister for Finance and Treasury	OUR Party
Manasseh Maelanga	Minister for Infrastructure Development	OUR Party
Harry Kuma	Minister for Commerce, Industries, Labour & Immigration	OUR Party
Fredrick Kologeto	Minister for Aviation and Communication	People First Party
Jimson Fiau Tanangada	Minister for Police, National Security and Correctional Services	OUR Party
Jammie Lency Vokia	Minister for Traditional Governance, Peace and Ecclesiastical Affairs	Kadere Party
Choylin Yim Douglas	Minister for Culture and Tourism	Independent
Tozen Leokana	Minister for Education and Human Resources Development	Independent
Isikeli Vave Jr.	Minister for Home Affairs	Independent
Rex Annex Ramofafia	Minister for National Planning and Development Coordination	OUR Party
Makario Tagini	Minister for Forestry and Research	OUR Party
Nestor Ghiro	Minister for Fisheries and Marine Resources	OUR Party
Clezy Rore	Minister for Justice and Legal Affairs	OUR Party
Rollen Seleso	Minister for Rural Development	OUR Party
Trevor Hedley Mahaga	Minister for Environment, Climate Change and Disaster Management and Meteorology	Independent
Wayne Osopo Ghemu	Minister for Provincial Government and Institutional Strengthening	People First Party
Paul Popora Bosawai	Minister for Health and Medical Services	Independent
John Junior Tuhaika	Minister for Public Service	Independent
Franklyn Derick Wasi	Minister for Agriculture and Livestock Development	Independent
Peter Shanel Agovaka	Minister for Foreign Affairs and External Trade	OUR Party
Polycarp Paea	Minister for Lands, Housing and Survey	Independent
Freda Soria Comua	Minister for Women, Youth and Family Affairs	OUR Party

== Reactions ==
Following his election, Manele called on citizens to refrain from post-election violence, urging to "respect and uphold the democratic process of electing our prime minister and set an example for our children and their children".

Australian Prime Minister Anthony Albanese congratulated Manele on his election as prime minister and said he looked forward to working closely with him. Papua New Guinean Deputy Prime Minister John Rosso visited Manele on 3 May where he presented a congratulatory letter behalf of Prime Minister James Marape. Rosso also emphasised Papua New Guinea's commitment to maintaining close ties with Solomon Islands. A New Zealand delegation led by Foreign Minister Winston Peters congratulated Manele during a visit to Honiara on 12 May. India's high commissioner to Solomon Islands, Inbasekar Sunaramuthi, congratulated Manele on behalf of the Indian government. Sunaramuthi also announced India's plans to sponsor infrastructure projects in Solomon Islands.
