= List of members of the Solomon Islands Parliament who died in office =

This is a list of members of the National Parliament of Solomon Islands who died in office.

== List ==
Name	Party	Constituency	Date	Age	Cause
Francis Aqorau	N/A	Western Province (Vona Vona-Rendova-Tetepare)	26 December 1976	57-58	Heart attack
Solomon Mamaloni	PPP	Makira-Ulawa Province (West Makira)	11 January 2000	56	Kidney disease
James Tarasele Saliga	N/A	Isabel Province (Gao-Bugotu)	June 2001	57-58	
Augustine Geve	People's Alliance	Guadalcanal Province (South Guadalcanal)	20 August 2002		Assassinated
Joses Wawari Sanga	N/A	Malaita (East Malaita)	1 May 2007	51	
Bartholomew Ulufa'alu	Liberal Party	Malaita (Aoke-Langalanga)	25 May 2007	56	Diabetes
Bently Samuel Ragosomani	N/A	Malaita (Lau-Mbaelelea)	14 December 2007		
Edward Huni'ehu	N/A	Malaita (East ꞌAreꞌare)	12 April 2010		Diabetes
Steve Laore	Independent	Western Province (Shortlands )	26 August 2010	46	Heart attack
Toswel Kaua	N/A	Malaita (Baegu-Asifola)	5 November 2010		
Johnley Tekiou Hatimoana	N/A	Central Province (Ngella)	18 April 2014	58	Pneumonia
Martin Magga	N/A	Temotu (Temotu Pele)	25 August 2014	60	
Peter Tom	Democratic Party	Malaita (West Kwaio)	5 November 2018	53-54	
Charles Maefai	N/A	Makira-Ulawa Province (East Makira)	9 July 2019		
Titus Mokofi Fika	United Democratic	Malaita (West Kwaio)	19 November 2021		
Sam Iduri	Democratic Party	Malaita (West Kwara'ae)	23 January 2023	73	
Snyder Rini	AIM	Western Province (Marovo)	4 August 2025	77	
