= Honiara City Council =

The Honiara City Council is an organisation that looks after the municipal affairs of Honiara, the capital city of the Solomon Islands on Guadalcanal Honiara is divided into twelve wards, each of which elect one councillor. There are eight extra councillors. Four are appointed by the Solomon Islands Minister of Home Affairs, and members of parliament representing the city are included, along with the premier of Guadalcanal province. The assembled council selects a mayor from one of the elected twelve.

The twelve electoral wards are from east to west: Panatina, Vura, Naha, Kukum, Kola'a, Mataniko, Vuhokesa, Vavaea, Cruz, Rove-Lengakiki, Mbumburu, Nggosi. Each ward has a development fund assigned to the councilor to spend. Auditors check out the spending to make sure it is not used as a slush fund.

Legislation that controls the function of the council includes the Honiara City Act 1999 and the Honiara City Council Election Regulations 1999, and the Local Government Act.

Functions of the council include rubbish collection. The council controls markets, cemeteries, litter bins, building construction, and issues license for hawkers or a business.
