= 2011 Shortlands by-election =

A by-election was held in the Shortlands constituency in Solomon Islands on March 30, 2011. The election followed the death of MP Steve Laore, an Independent, who was elected to the seat for his first term in the 2010 general election, and died just twenty-one days later, on August 25.

Laore had been a member of Prime Minister Danny Philip's parliamentary majority. When the date for the by-election was set, in mid-February, Philip was facing the threat of a motion of no confidence, seemingly having narrowly lost his majority in Parliament. Simultaneously, it was announced Parliament would reconvene on March 28, just prior to the election of Laore's successor, with expectations that a vote would be held on a motion of no confidence.

There were four candidates. Christopher Laore, brother of Steve Laore, was elected with 1353 votes. Augustine Taneko, a former Member of Parliament, received 731. Pellion Buare obtained 111, while Joseph Isand Pitu received a single vote.

== Results ==
Candidate	Votes	%
Christopher Laore	1,353	61.61
Augustine Taneko	731	33.29
Pellion Buare	111	5.05
Joseph Isang Pitu	1	0.05
Total	2,196	100.00
Valid votes	2,196	99.82
Invalid/blank votes	4	0.18
Total votes	2,200	100.00
Registered voters/turnout	2,939	74.86

== See also ==
- List of Solomon Islands by-elections
