= Rawcliff Manu'ari =

Solomon Islands politician

Member of the National Parliament of the Solomon Islands
- Incumbent
- Assumed office 17 April 2024
- Constituency: West Makira

Personal details
- Party: Solomon Islands Democratic Party
- Other political affiliations: People First Party (formerly)

Derrick Rawcliff Manu'ari is a Solomon Islands politician from the Solomon Islands Democratic Party.

He was originally affiliated with the People First Party as a member of International Parliamentarians for West Papua (IPWP).

In the 2024 Solomon Islands general election, he was elected to the National Parliament of the Solomon Islands in West Makira constiruency.
