= Cathy Nori =

Member of the National Parliament
- Incumbent
- Assumed office 17 April 2024
- Preceded by: Culwick Togamana
- Constituency: Maringe-Kokota

Personal details
- Born: 1967 (age 58–59)
- Party: Independent
- Other political affiliations: People First Party (previously)

Catherine Launa Nori, known as Cathy Nori, (born 1967) is a Solomon Islands politician.

== Biography ==
Initially the general manager of a maritime transport company based on Santa Isabel Island, she then founded her own small business in this field with her husband.

She was an unsuccessful candidate in the Maringe-Kokota constituency in the 2014 Solomon Islands general election (for the People First Party) and 2019 (as an independent candidate) parliamentary elections, though she still obtained 32.9% of the vote in 2019, finishing behind Culwick Togamana (46.1%).

A member of the Solomon Islands United Party, she again ran as an independent in the 2024 elections in this constituency, having simply not received the party's endorsement in time to register as a candidate. She campaigned primarily on the need to build roads in her rural constituency, and this time won the seat with 32.6% of the vote, edging out the incumbent MP (30.8%) by about one hundred votes. Joining the United Party parliamentary group, she supported Matthew Wale's candidacy for Prime Minister as part of a coalition of opposition parties. When the coalition failed to form a majority in the National Parliament of Solomon Islands, she became a member of the independent group led by Peter Kenilorea Jr. (leader of the United Party), that is, the group of MPs who were neither part of the parliamentary majority nor the official opposition.
