= East Choiseul constituency =

East Choiseul
- Single-member constituency for the National Parliament of the Solomon Islands
- Region: Choiseul Province

Current constituency
- Created: 1993
- Created from: North Choiseul Constituency
- Current MP: Manasseh Sogavare
- Party: Independent

East Choiseul is a single-member constituency of the National Parliament of Solomon Islands. Located on Choiseul Island, it was established in 1993 when Parliament was expanded from 38 to 47 seats; Its first MP, Allan Qurusu, had previously served as the MP for North Choiseul between 1980 and 1993, when the constituency was abolished.

== List of MPs ==
Election	MP	Party
1993	Allan Qurusu	
1997	Manasseh Sogavare	
2001	Manasseh Sogavare	People's Progressive Party
2006	Manasseh Sogavare	Social Credit Party
2010	Manasseh Sogavare	OUR Party
2014	Manasseh Sogavare	Independent
2019	Manasseh Sogavare	Independent
2024	Manasseh Sogavare	OUR Party

== Election results ==
=== 2019 ===
2019 general election
Candidate	Party	Votes
Manasseh Sogavare	Independent	1,860
Ezra Kukuti	People's Progressive Party	775
James Ron Kaboke	Solomon Islands United Party	485
Loloma Pabulu	Independent	19
Danson Tanito	Solomon Islands Democratic Party	15
Invalid/blank votes		4
Total		3,138
Registered voters		3,802
Source: Solomon Islands Electoral Commission

=== 2014 ===
2014 general election
Candidate	Party	Votes
Manasseh Sogavare	Independent	1,596
Ronald Pitamama	Democratic Alliance Party	602
James Ron Kaboke	Solomon Islands People First Party	320
Invalid/blank votes		12
Total		
Registered voters		
Source: Election Passport

=== 2010 ===
2010 general election
Candidate	Party	Votes
Manasseh Sogavare	Ownership, Unity and Responsibility Party	1,913
Moses Kurebose Biliki	People's Alliance Party	384
Hence Vaekesa	People's Congress Party	100
Sheperd Lapo	National Party	248
Invalid/blank votes		20
Total		2,665
Registered voters		4,000
Source: Election Passport

=== 2006 ===
2006 general election
Candidate	Party	Votes
Manasseh Sogavare		854
Francis Qalokamake		646
Gordon Volaka		371
Moses Kurebose Biliki		355
Billy Takubala		136
Invalid/blank votes		32
Total		2,394
Registered voters		4,028
Source: Election Passport

=== 2001 ===
2001 general election
Candidate	Party	Votes
Manasseh Sogavare		1,225
Allan Qurusu		952
Billy Takubala		190
Nason Neko Degerekolo		137
Invalid/blank votes		
Total		2,504
Registered voters		3,377
Source: Election Passport

=== 1997 ===
1997 general election
Candidate	Party	Votes
Manasseh Sogavare		1,111
Allan Qurusu		588
Invalid/blank votes		
Total		1,699
Registered voters		2,452
Source: Election Passport

=== 1993 ===
1993 general election
Candidate	Party	Votes
Allan Qurusu		903
Hence Vaekesa		260
Paul Puqara Lekelalu		65
Jacab Sogavare		62
Invalid/blank votes		
Total		1,290
Registered voters		1,570
Source: Election Passport
