= East Guadalcanal constituency =

East Guadalcanal
- Single-member constituency for the National Parliament of the Solomon Islands
- Region: Guadalcanal Province

Current constituency
- Created: 1970
- Current MP: Braddley Tovosia
- Party: Independent

East Guadalcanal is a single-member constituency of the National Parliament of Solomon Islands. Located on the island of Guadalcanal, it was established in 1970 when the Governing Council was created and the number of elected seats increased from 14 to 17.

== List of MPs ==
Term	MP	Party
1970–1973	Leone Laku	
1973–1976	Waeta Ben	
1976–1980	David Valusa	
1980–1984	Ezekiel Alebua	
1984–1989	Ezekiel Alebua	
1989–1993	Ezekiel Alebua	
1993–1997	Ezekiel Alebua	
1997–2001	Johnson Koli	
2001–2006	Johnson Koli	
2006–2010	Johnson Koli	
2010–2014	Braddley Tovosia	Independent
2014–	Braddley Tovosia	Independent

== Election results ==
=== 2014 ===
2014 general election
Candidate	Party	Votes
Braddley Tovosia	Independent	3,377
Bendick Tova	United Democratic Party	1,058
George Tausiria	Kadare Party	522
Sampson Tahuniara	New Nation Party	340
Jack Koti	Solomon Islands People First Party	278
Enif Petsakibo	Pan-Melanesian Congress Party	27
Invalid/blank votes		30
Total		
Registered voters		
Source: Election Passport

=== 2010 ===
2010 general election
Candidate	Party	Votes
Braddley Tovosia		1,630
Sampson Tahuniara	Ownership, Unity and Responsibility Party	818
Johnson Koli		505
John Hue		404
Ezekiel Alebua		293
Kennedy Hoda		168
Henry Pechakibo		153
Joe Tuti Ruriti		117
Joseph Hikuta'a		64
Bendick Tova		40
Invalid/blank votes		
Total		4,192
Registered voters		7,318
Source: Election Passport

=== 2006 ===
2006 general election
Candidate	Party	Votes
Johnson Koli		1,172
Fred Laku		571
Bendick Tova		568
Joseph Hikuta'a		493
John Marahare		280
Shaniella Talasifera		153
Invalid/blank votes		150
Total		3,387
Registered voters		6,212
Source: Election Passport

=== 2001 ===
2001 general election
Candidate	Party	Votes
Johnson Koli		1,815
Celestine Solosaia		1,355
Bobby Marcellin Tangi		234
Josph Tua'ai		67
Invalid/blank votes		
Total		3,471
Registered voters		5,542
Source: Election Passport

=== 1997 ===
1997 general election
Candidate	Party	Votes
Johnson Koli		1,105
Douglas Ete		746
Ezekiel Alebua		529
Claudios Sarai		279
Garnett Babaua		214
Bobby Marcellin Tangi		175
Judith Tafea		80
Invalid/blank votes		
Total		3,128
Registered voters		4,781
Source: Election Passport

=== 1993 ===
1993 general election
Candidate	Party	Votes
Ezekiel Alebua		668
Johnson Koli		621
Anastasius Oreimara		392
David Valusa		352
Chaniel Diki		249
Sam Iko		109
Invalid/blank votes		
Total		2,391
Registered voters		3,894
Source: Election Passport

=== 1989 ===
1989 general election
Candidate	Party	Votes
Ezekiel Alebua		876
Johnson Koli		455
David Valusa		272
Neven Onorio		230
Moses Buta		119
Julius Taipou		95
John Pedeleni		62
Invalid/blank votes		
Total		2,109
Registered voters		3,112
Source: Election Passport

=== 1984 ===
1984 general election
Candidate	Party	Votes
Ezekiel Alebua		958
David Valusa		397
Johnson Koli		368
Norman Onorio		239
Invalid/blank votes		
Total		1,962
Registered voters		
Source: Election Passport

=== 1980 ===
1980 general election
Candidate	Party	Votes
Ezekiel Alebua		297
David Valusa		268
Sam Iko		207
Calisto Houma		199
T. Labuvilia		199
E. I. Oha		66
W. Teteha		60
Joel Kikolo		19
Invalid/blank votes		
Total		1,315
Registered voters		3,273
Source: Election Passport

=== 1976 ===
1976 general election
Candidate	Party	Votes
David Valusa		438
Sukuatu Malakia		362
Joel Kikolo		245
Sam Iko		161
Donasiano Pororasu		132
Salathiel Lence Roger		78
Invalid/blank votes		
Total		1,416
Registered voters		
Source: Election Passport

=== 1973 ===
1973 general election
Candidate	Party	Votes
Waeta Ben		618
David Valusa		216
Joel Kikolo		171
James Bosa		148
Sukuatu Malakia		113
Donasiano Pororasu		83
Salathiel Lence Roger		83
Michael Aike		54
Calisto Houma		46
Gabriel Narasia		40
Invalid/blank votes		
Total		1,572
Registered voters		
Source: Election Passport

=== 1970 ===
1970 general election
Candidate	Party	Votes
Leone Laku		442
Joseph Bryan		422
Joel Kikolo		146
David Valusa		89
William Norman Tasker		66
Invalid/blank votes		
Total		1,165
Registered voters		2,512
Source: Election Passport
