= Bradley Tovosia =

Solomon Islands politician (born 1967)

The Right Honourable Bradley Tovosia MP

Minister for the Environment and Conservation
- In office 22 October 2012 – 2014
- Prime Minister: Gordon Darcy Lilo
- Preceded by: John Moffat Fugui

Minister for Public Service
- In office 1 March 2012 – 22 October 2012
- Prime Minister: Gordon Darcy Lilo
- Preceded by: Alfred Ghiro
- Succeeded by: Stanley Sofu

Minister for Fisheries and Marine Resources
- In office 21 November 2011 – 1 March 2012?
- Prime Minister: Gordon Darcy Lilo
- Preceded by: Bodo Dettke
- Succeeded by: Alfred Ghiro

Minister for Forestry
- In office 22 January 2011 – 21 November 2011
- Prime Minister: Danny Philip
- Preceded by: Douglas Ete
- Succeeded by: Dickson Mua

Minister for Provincial Government and Institutional Strengthening
- In office 27 August 2010 – 22 January 2011
- Prime Minister: Danny Philip

Member of Parliament for East Guadalcanal
- Incumbent
- Assumed office 4 August 2010
- Preceded by: Johnson Koli

Personal details
- Born: 10 April 1967 (age 59) Sukiki Village, Guadalcanal, British Solomon Islands
- Party: Independent

Bradley Tovosia (born 10 April 1967 in Sukiki Village, Guadalcanal) is a Solomon Islands politician who has held several cabinet posts. In 2024, he was Minister of Mines, Energy, and Rural Electrification.

He studied at Betikama College up to Form 5.

His career in national politics began when he was elected to Parliament as the member for East Guadalcanal in the August 2010 general election, standing as an independent candidate. He was then appointed Minister for Provincial Government and Institutional Strengthening in Prime Minister Danny Philip's Cabinet. On 22 January, in a Cabinet reshuffle prompted by the resignation of several ministers, Tovosia was promoted to the position of Minister for Forestry. When Gordon Darcy Lilo replaced Philip as Prime Minister in November 2011, Tovosia was reshuffled to the Fisheries portfolio. On or around 1 March 2012, Tovosia was reshuffled again, becoming Minister for Public Service, exchanging his portfolio with Alfred Ghiro. On 22 October, Tovosia was reshuffled to the position of Minister for the Environment, replacing John Moffat Fugui who had left the government.

Tovosia had ultimate authority over the project to construct the Kongulai Water Treatment Plant. The project failed after it was granted to its lowest bidder, a joint Indian venture. The joint Indian venture in turn hired a company employed by Tovosia's son to carry out tasks related to the project.
