= Augustine Taneko =

Solomon Islands politician (born 1954)

Augustine Taneko (born October 3 1954) was a member of the National Parliament of Solomon Islands, representing the Shortlands constituency. He lives in Shortlands, in the Western Province, and was first elected in 2001. He was replaced by Steve Laore. After Steve Laore's death, Taneko ran for election to his former seat, finishing 2nd to Christopher Laore.
