= 2023 Solomon Islands protests =

Crisis in Solomon Islands

- Date: February 2023
- Location: Solomon Islands
- Caused by: Removal of Daniel Suidani as Premier of Malaita Province
- Methods: Protests

In February 2023, protests broke out in the Solomon Islands.

== Background ==
The country previously was hit by mass unrest and deadly riots in November 2021. The Guadalcanal Landowner Defendant Force (GLODF) threatened to protest during the 2023 Pacific Games. The Solomon Islands has recently been deepening ties with China over their historic primary ally the United States. This was a concern of Australia and the Biden Administration.

== Events ==
On 2 February 2023, the United States reopened its embassy in the country after a 30-year absence. On 7 February 2023, Premier of Malaita Province Daniel Suidani was removed from office after a vote of no confidence from the provincial legislature. Suidani had pushed for independence from the central government. As premier he did not recognise the One China Policy of the government. Under Suidani, Malaita's provincial assembly opposed the diplomatic switch to from Taiwan to the PRC. Suidani was accused of misappropriating funds. His supporters stated that his criticism of China was the reason for his removal.

As a result, protests were held in Auki. The protests were in Malaita province. There were reports of police teargassing protesters.

== Consequences ==
Suidani was succeeded by Martin Fini. The April 2024 Solomon Islands general election was considered important for China–United States relations. In October 2024, Daniel Suidani was arrested and charged in relation to unlawful protests.
