= East Kwaio constituency =

East Kwaio
- Single-member constituency for the National Parliament of the Solomon Islands
- Region: Malaita Province

Current constituency
- Created: 1976
- Created from: Kwaio
- Current MP: Stanley Festus Sofu
- Party: Independent

East Kwaio is a single-member constituency of the National Parliament of Solomon Islands. Located on the east coast of the centre of the island of Malaita, it was established in 1976 when the Legislative Assembly was expanded from 24 to 38 seats.

== List of MPs ==
Term	MP	Party
1976–1980	Jonathan Fiifii'i	
1980–1984	Daniel Fa'asifoaba'e	
1984–1989	Daniel Fa'asifoaba'e	
1989–1993	John Fisango	
1993–1997	John Fisango	
1997–2001	Alfred Solomon Sasako	
2001–2006	Alfred Solomon Sasako	
2006–2010	Stanley Festus Sofu	
2010–2014	Stanley Festus Sofu	Solomon Islands Democratic Party
2014–	Stanley Festus Sofu	Independent

== Election results ==
=== 2014 ===
2014 general election
Candidate	Party	Votes
Stanley Festus Sofu	Independent	2,748
Alfred Solomon Sasako	Direct Development Party	988
Diki Kolosu	Independent	501
John Taniamae	Solomon Islands Party for Rural Advancement	472
Robert Firigeni	Kadare Party	418
Simon Baete	Pipol First Party	227
Wilfred Mete	Independent	117
Joseph Shem Bibiasi	Pan-Melanesian Congress	101
Genesis Eddie Kofana	Independent	76
Joseph Elvis Isafi	National Transformation Party	74
Herikdun Bubunaia Siope	Independent	72
Jimmy Masa	People's Alliance Party	29
Invalid/blank votes		48
Total		
Registered voters		
Source: Election Passport

=== 2010 ===
2010 general election
Candidate	Party	Votes
Stanley Festus Sofu	Solomon Islands Democratic Party	3,973
Alfred Solomon Sasako		1,581
Herrick Dennie		190
Solomon Amos Morisudah		20
Invalid/blank votes		101
Total		5,865
Registered voters		10,448
Source: Election Passport

=== 2006 ===
2006 general election
Candidate	Party	Votes
Stanley Festus Sofu		1,557
Senda Fifi		849
Billy Abae		701
Alfred Solomon Sasako		652
Delson Wane Safa'a		475
Henry Faasifoabae		226
Nelson Richard Isika		163
Invalid/blank votes		
Total		4,623
Registered voters		8,856
Source: Election Passport

=== 2001 ===
2001 general election
Candidate	Party	Votes
Alfred Solomon Sasako		2,682
Stanley Festus Sofu		1,027
Diki Kolosu		331
Bilsshan Caleb Safa'a		229
Invalid/blank votes		
Total		4,269
Registered voters		7,450
Source: Election Passport

=== 1997 ===
1997 general election
Candidate	Party	Votes
Alfred Solomon Sasako		896
John Fisango		602
John Fiuwalekwala		544
Gideon Siofa		451
James Tommy Fa'awela'a		126
Aziel Laete'e		121
Robert Soekeni		119
Stowell Fika Kolosu		35
Invalid/blank votes		
Total		2,894
Registered voters		4,812
Source: Election Passport

=== 1993 ===
1993 general election
Candidate	Party	Votes
John Fisango		1,034
Lee Silomo Kolosu		330
Jared Oda Ngele		261
Samson Ubuni		199
Gideon Siofa		121
Invalid/blank votes		
Total		1,945
Registered voters		4,094
Source: Election Passport

=== 1989 ===
1989 general election
Candidate	Party	Votes
John Fisango		347
Samuel Fangaria		188
George Henry Tafoa		164
Dick Kolosu Fuamae		161
Joseph Firiabae		157
Samson Ubuni		152
Gideon Siofa		132
Kadmiel Martin		107
Azel Laete Susua		81
Ken Gala'a		56
Invalid/blank votes		
Total		1,545
Registered voters		3,200
Source: Election Passport

=== 1984 ===
1984 general election
Candidate	Party	Votes
Daniel Fa'asifoaba'e		
Jonathan Fiifii'i		
Kalisto Koke		
Samson Ubuni		
Silas Wanebeni		
Invalid/blank votes		
Total		
Registered voters		
Source: Election Passport

=== 1980 ===
1980 general election
Candidate	Party	Votes
Daniel Fa'asifoaba'e		646
Jonathan Fiifii'i		604
Invalid/blank votes		
Total		1,250
Registered voters		3,003
Source: Election Passport

=== 1976 ===
1976 general election
Candidate	Party	Votes
Jonathan Fiifii'i		849
John Fisango		278
Invalid/blank votes		
Total		1,127
Registered voters		
Source: Election Passport
