= Suidani =

Suidani is a surname. Notable people with the surname include:

- Ahmed Suidani (1932–1994), Syrian soldier and politician
- Daniel Suidani (1970–2025), Solomon Islands politician
