= Francis Aqorau =

Solomon Islands civil servant and politician

Member of the Legislative Assembly
- In office 1976
- Succeeded by: John Talasasa
- Constituency: Vona Vona/Rendova/Tetepari

Personal details
- Born: 1928; Kokeqolo, Solomon Islands
- Died: 26 December 1976; Honiara, Solomon Islands

Francis Aqorau Talasasa (1928 – 26 December 1976) was a Solomon Islands civil servant and politician. He briefly served as a member of the Legislative Assembly in 1976.

== Biography ==
Aqorau was born in the New Georgia village of Kokeqolo in 1928. His father Milton Talasasa was a politician, serving as president of Roviana Council and on the Solomon Islands Advisory Council. He attended All Hallows' School in Pawa, Queen Victoria School in Fiji and St Andrew's College in Christchurch in New Zealand, finishing his schooling in 1953.

Aqorau then studied at the University of Canterbury and in 1956 became the first Solomon Islander to graduate with a bachelor's degree. He remained at the university until the following year to earn a master's degree. He married Merle Aqorau in 1958, later adopting her surname. The two relocated to England, where he spent a year at the University of Cambridge studying colonial administration, also visiting local councils, while his wife studied domestic science in London. After returning to the Solomon Islands, he became a Cadet Administrative Officer in Malaita in 1959. He was soon promoted to Deputy Commissioner, the first Solomon Islander to reach such a position. In June 1962 he was also the first Solomon Islander to be appointed as a magistrate.

After serving as Clerk to the Legislative Council in 1964 and 1965, he transferred to the administration of the Gilbert and Ellice Islands, where was appointed a District Officer in 1966. He returned to the Solomon Islands as District Commissioner for Eastern District, before retiring in 1974.

Aqorau then entered politics, becoming president of Western Council. In June 1976 he contested the elections to the Legislative Assembly, and was elected from the Vona Vona/Rendova/Tetepari constituency. However, he died in December the same year, suffering a heart attack while playing tennis on Boxing Day.
