= Choylin Yim Douglas =

Solomon Islands politician

Choylin Yim Douglas, also known as Yim Douglas, is a politician from the Solomon Islands.

She was elected as a member of the National Parliament of the Solomon Islands for the Ngella constituency in April 2024, as an independent member, having previously contested the seat in 2019. She was appointed Minister for the Ministry of Culture and Tourism in May 2024.

She is the finance and administration manager of Douglas Concrete, the Solomon Islands company founded by Keith Douglas and of which her husband Reginald is a director and CEO.
