= Umi for Change Party =

Political party in the Solomon Islands

- Abbreviation: U4C
- Founder: Daniel Suidani
- Founded: 2022
- Registered: 9 January 2024
- Ideology: Economic liberalism
- National Parliament of the Solomon Islands: 1 / 50

The Umi for Change Party (U4C) is a political party in the Solomon Islands. The party was founded in 2022 by Premier of Malaita Province Daniel Suidani.

== History ==
Suidani, a vocal critic of the Sogavare government's switch of diplomatic recognition from Taiwan to China and its expansion of ties with the latter, was ousted as premier in 2023 after losing a no-confidence vote, allegedly due to his opposition to the switch. Suidani explained that U4C is a successor to the Malaita Alliance for Rural Advancement government, which he led as premier of Malaita. The Political Parties Commission approved U4C's registration on 9 January 2024; the party subsequently launched a manifesto. One of U4C's key policies included revoking the absolute legal immunity that public officials enjoy. Suidani said this policy was necessary, citing numerous officials allegedly "hiding behind the law" and "making reckless decisions on behalf of the state." The party also pledged to address gender inequality and focus on youth-related issues; U4C aimed to establish an education program on employment to decrease youth unemployment. In the election, 2024 Solomon Islands general election, the party won over 10,000 votes and 3% of the national vote share, with one candidate elected to Parliament; Suilea Waneoroa in North Malaita.

== Leaders ==
The party has the following leadership:

- Party Vice President: Wendy Vahoe
- Secretary: Celsius Talifilu

== Policies ==
The party supports private sector. They pledge the removing of public officers immunity.

== Election results ==
Election	Votes	%	Seats	+/–	Government
2024	10,388	3.00 (#1)	1 / 50	New	TBA

== See also ==
- List of political parties in the Solomon Islands
