= Selwyn Riumana =

Solomon Islands politician (born 1966)

Selwyn Riumana (born June 30, 1966) is a member of the National Parliament of the Solomon Islands. He lives in Isabel Province, and previously served as Minister of Agriculture and Livestock of the Solomon Islands.

On December of 2022, Riumana was a serious partner of the First Maritime Training Forum in the Solomon Islands due to his state as a member of the National Parliament of the Solomon Islands. Some goals of the Forum were based on Riumana's thoughts.
