= Andrew Manepora =

Solomon Islands politician (born 1967)

Deputy Speaker of Parliament

Andrew Manepora (born 1 December 1967) is a politician of Solomon Islands who served as Deputy Speakers of the National Parliament of the Solomon Islands.
