= Merle Aqorau =

Solomon Islander and social worker (born 1939)

- Born: 1939 (age 86–87); Munda on the island of New Georgia, British Solomon Islands Protectorate
- Other names: Angeline Merle Aqorau, Merle Angeline Talasasa
- Occupations: social worker, women's rights activist
- Years active: 1965–

Merle Aqorau, MBE (born 1939) is a Solomon Islander and social worker who was instrumental in the development of the women's movement in the Solomon Islands. Engaged as a social welfare officer, she established women's clubs in various locations throughout Melanesia, founded a YWCA training centre to assist young women in continuing their education and worked as the regional secretary of the United Church Women's Fellowship (UCWF). Her pioneering service to women in the Solomon Islands was recognised, when she was awarded an MBE in the Order of the British Empire in 2016.

== Early life ==
Aqorau was born in 1939 at the Helena Goldie Hospital, at the Kokeqolo Methodist Mission in Munda on the island of New Georgia, British Solomon Islands Protectorate. She attended St. Hilda's Anglican Girls School in the Bungana village on Gela Island and then earned her senior leaving certificate from the Kokeqolo School in Munda. Though she earned a scholarship to continue her education in New Zealand, in 1958 she chose to marry instead, uniting with Francis Talasasa, who would later change their surname to Aquorau. Talasasa was the first Solomon Islander to have earned a university degree, completing a bachelor's at Canterbury University. The couple immediately left for England where Talasasa completed a course at the University of Cambridge in Colonial Administration an Aqorau attended various classes in London as well.

== Career ==
In 1959, the couple returned to the Solomon Islands, where Talasasa took up a post in Auki, on Malaita Island, as an administrative officer. Aqorau volunteered with the British Solomon Islands Brownies and Girl Guides and the British Red Cross, while raising their son, Transform. In 1962, they were transferred to Kirakira on Makira Island and then moved in 1964 to Honiara on the island of Guadalcanal. She began working as an assistant Social Welfare Officer in 1965 and her duties included establishing Women's Clubs to teach the women cooking and sewing. Among the clubs she helped establish were in the suburbs of Rove and White River, among others.

In 1966 her husband became the first District Officer of the Gilbert Islands and she continued to work setting up Women's clubs in the Gilbert and Ellice Islands. The family returned to Honiara in 1973, where Aqorau became a tour guide and the first woman to work as a taxi driver. Still involved with women's activities, she became involved with the United Church Women's Fellowship (UCWF), serving as the regional secretary for Papua New Guinea and the Solomon Islands for five years. When her husband died in 1976 Aqorau returned to her home village in Munda, but continued her work with UCWF. Asked to help establish a YWCA centre to help prevent young women from leaving school, she began an affiliation with the organisation in 1978. Because there was no facility, the organization met in her home, until a building could be built. The YWCA Women's Training Centre is colloquially called the "Merle Aqorau" Centre. During her tenure, she helped found the first kindergarten in Munda.

In 1980, when women began discussing the idea of establishing a National Council of Women, Aqorau became involved in the organisation and was elected as the inaugural president in 1983. She served in the post for three years, while simultaneously acting as coordinator of the YWCA Training Centre. She ran for provincial office on the Western Provincial Government Area Council and in 1997 contested in the national elections. After 20 years of directing the YWCA in Munda, she retired from the organisation in 1998 and turned her focus to her church work helping organize the centennial celebrations of the establishment of the Methodist Church in the Solomon Islands. In 2000, she was among the delegates to attend the Peace Talks aboard HMAS Tobruk during the ethnic crisis of 1998–2003. Her work as a pioneering worker for women was recognised in 2016, when she was honoured with an MBE in the Order of the British Empire.
