= Johnson Koli =

Solomon Islands politician (born 1953)

Johnson Koli (born 13 November 1953) is a Solomon Islands politician who served a member of the National Parliament of the Solomon Islands between 1997 and 2010, representing the East Guadalcanal constituency. He served as Minister of Health and Medical Services in Prime Minister Derek Sikua's Cabinet until May 2009, when he was transferred to the position of Minister for Women, Youth, and Children.
