= Christopher Laore =

Solomon Islands politician

The Right Honourable Christopher Laore MP

Minister for Police, National Security and Correctional Services
- Incumbent
- Assumed office 22 October 2012
- Prime Minister: Gordon Darcy Lilo
- Preceded by: David Tome

Member of Parliament for Shortlands
- Incumbent
- Assumed office 30 March 2011
- Preceded by: Steve Laore

Personal details
- Party: Independent

Christopher Laore is a Solomon Islands politician.

A physiotherapist, he worked as Director of Rehabilitation Services at the National Referral Hospital in Honiara. In August 2010, his brother Steve Laore was elected first-time Member of Parliament for the constituency of Shortlands, in the Western Province, but died suddenly just three weeks later. Christopher Laore resigned from his position in the hospital to stand as a candidate in the resulting bye-election in March 2011, which he won with 58.9% of the vote. Upon being elected, he stated: "At this time I don't have any plans and visions. My people want me to come and implement the plans and visions of my brother", which he described as improving the livelihood of the people and helping them be self-reliant.

After serving as a backbencher in Prime Minister Danny Philip's parliamentary majority, in early November 2011, he joined a mass defection to the opposition, bringing down Philip's government. He sat on the backbenches in the parliamentary majority of new Prime Minister Gordon Darcy Lilo. On 22 October 2012, Lilo appointed him Minister for Police, National Security and Correctional Services.
