= Elizabeth Kausimae =

Elizabeth Kausimae is a government official from the Solomon Islands. She is a senior official in the Ministry of Finance and Treasury.

== Life ==
Kausimae has held the positions of permanent under-secretary and permanent secretary in the Ministry of Finance and Treasury. In 2009, Kausimae co-ordinated the steering committee for the Solomon Islands Housing and Population Census.
