= Peter Kenilorea Jr. =

Solomon Islands politician (born 1973)

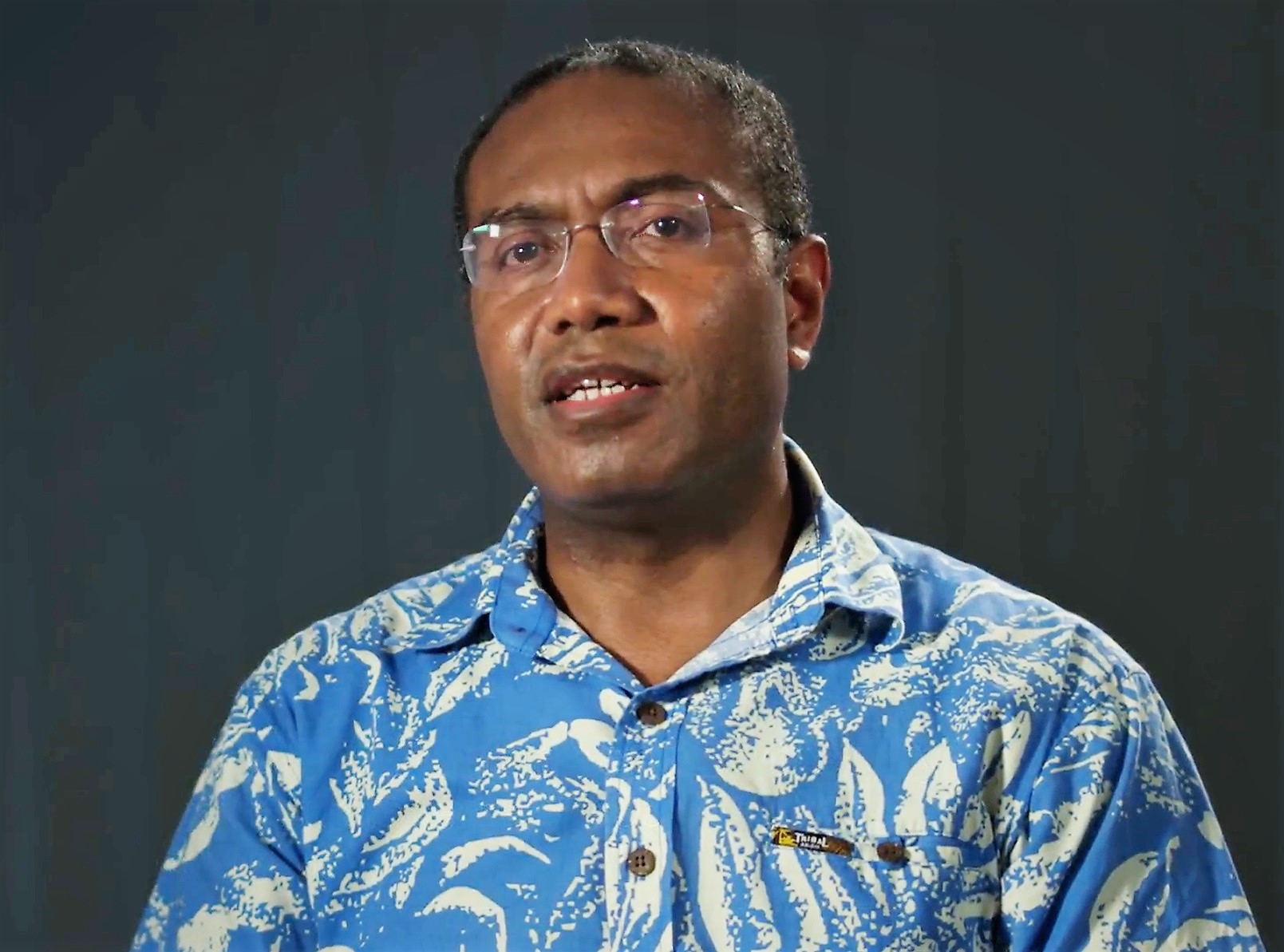
Kenilorea Jr in 2018

Peter Kenilorea Jr. is a Solomon Islander politician. He is the son of Peter Kenilorea, and was elected to the National Parliament of Solomon Islands in 2019.

== Early life and education ==
Peter Kenilorea Jr. was born around 1973. His father Peter Kenilorea was the first Prime Minister of Solomon Islands. Kenilorea Jr. attended Su’u National Secondary School on Malaita, then transferred to Wesley College, Auckland, in New Zealand. Upon the completion of secondary education, Kenilorea Jr. pursued a Bachelor of Laws at the University of Waikato, followed by a Master of Laws in international law at the University of Nottingham.

== Career ==
Kenilorea began his legal career with Jennifer Corrin Barrister & Solicitor in 1994. He began working for the Attorney General of the Solomon Islands in 1996, and left his government position for the United Nations in 2000. Kenilorea held several roles at the UN, returning to the government of Solomon Islands in 2017 as permanent secretary of the Ministry of Foreign Affairs and External Trade. Kenilorea contested the 2019 general election on behalf of the United Party, and was elected a member of parliament for East ꞌAreꞌare. Supporters of Kenilorea's predecessor, Andrew Manepora'a, filed a petition against Kenilorea alleging corruption in May 2019. In March 2020, the petition was dismissed.

The United Party supported Kenilorea's candidacy for head of government, an office won by Manasseh Sogavare. Soon after Sogavare's fourth cabinet took office, his government chose to end diplomatic relations with the Republic of China. Kenilorea sharply criticized the establishment of bilateral relations with the People's Republic of China. He offered public support to John Maneniaru, who described the diplomatic switch as the government serving "new Chinese masters" in October 2019. Through May 2020, Kenilorea petitioned for a change in leadership. As the Solomon Islands government took action against the COVID-19 pandemic in Oceania, Kenilorea continued bringing attention to Taiwan's humanitarian aid. He urged the government to serve Solomon Islanders, and regularly questioned government efforts regarding COVID-19.
