= Shortlands constituency =

Parliamentary constituency of Solomon Islands

Shortlands
- Single-member constituency for the National Parliament of Solomon Islands
- Region: Western Province

Current constituency
- Created: 1993
- Current MP: Christopher Laore
- Party: People's Alliance Party
- Constituents: 3,293 (2019)

Shortlands is a parliamentary constituency electing one representative to the National Parliament of Solomon Islands. It is one of eight constituencies in Western Province and covers the Shortland Islands.

The constituency was one of the thirty-eight original constituencies established for the First Parliament elected in 1976. Its first MP was Remesion Eresi.

== List of MPs ==
Term	MP	Party
1976–1980	Remesion Eresi	?
1980–1984	Peter Salaka	?
1984–1989	Peter Salaka	?
1989–1993	Albert Laore	?
1993–1997	Albert Laore	?
1997–2001	Albert Laore	?
2001–2006	Augustine Taneko	?
2006–2010	Augustine Taneko	People's Alliance Party
2010–2011	Steve Laore	Independent
2011–2014 (by-election)	Christopher Laore	Independent
2014–2019	Christopher Laore	Independent
2019–	Christopher Laore	People's Alliance Party

== Election results ==
=== 2019 ===
2019 general election
Candidate	Party	Votes
Christopher Laore	People's Alliance Party	1,978
Caroline Laore Gorae	Democratic Alliance Party	938
Steve Jarred Laore	Independent	6
Saeda Iraviri	Independent	0
Invalid/blank votes		6
Total		2,975
Registered voters		3,293
Source: Solomon Islands Electoral Commission

=== 2014 ===
2014 general election
Candidate	Party	Votes
Christopher Laore	Independent	938
Ninamo Otuana	Independent	532
Pellion Buare	People's Alliance Party	319
Brisbane Amatore	United Democratic Party	185
George Taylor	Independent	17
Derick Pako	Independent	2
Invalid/blank votes		–
Total		4,834
Registered voters		–
Source: Solomon Islands Electoral Commission

=== 2011 (by-election) ===
2011 Shortlands by-election
Candidate	Party	Votes
Christopher Laore	Independent	1,353
Augustine Taneko		731
Pellion Buare	People's Alliance Party	111
Joseph Isang Pitu		1
Invalid/blank votes		4
Total		2,200
Registered voters		2,939
Source: Election Passport

=== 2010 ===
2010 general election
Candidate	Party	Votes
Steve Laore	Reform Democratic Party	1,073
Augustine Taneko		901
Albert Bakale Laore		136
Derick Pako		12
Ronnie Kidoe		5
Ninamo Otuana		5
Invalid/blank votes		43
Total		2,176
Registered voters		2,939
Source: Election Passport

=== 2006 ===
2006 general election
Candidate	Party	Votes
Augustine Taneko		592
Albert Bakale Laore		340
James Laore		253
Queensland Olega		197
Michael Kalanuma		190
John Alisae B.		122
Steve Laore		86
Invalid/blank votes		22
Total		1,802
Registered voters		2,556
Source: Election Passport

=== 2001 ===
2001 general election
Candidate	Party	Votes
Augustine Taneko		382
Albert Bakale Laore		365
Acquila Maike		273
Dominic Tata		218
Caroline Laore Gorae		132
Martina Ului		98
Roy Kelosi		94
Robert Lebo		88
Joseph Isang Pitu		71
Moses Silvestern Bariri		35
Invalid/blank votes		–
Total		1,756
Registered voters		2,330
Source: Election Passport

=== 1997 ===
1997 general election
Candidate	Party	Votes
Albert Bakale Laore		426
Dominic Tata		320
George Lepping		320
Augustine Taneko		122
Christopher Laore		94
Invalid/blank votes		–
Total		1,282
Registered voters		1,451
Source: Election Passport

=== 1993 ===
1993 general election
Candidate	Party	Votes
Albert Bakale Laore		753
Peter J. Salaka		262
Joseph Isang Pitu		130
Invalid/blank votes		–
Total		1,145
Registered voters		1,736
Source: Election Passport
