= Anthony Veke =

Solomon Islands politician

Anthony Veke (born c. 1977) is the premier of Guadalcanal Province of the Solomon Islands. He succeeded Bartholomew Vavanga following a no-confidence vote in 2016; he was elected by the Provincial assembly in a vote of twelve to nine (he ran against Rolland Seleso).
