= Vavaea, Honiara =

Coordinates: 9°26′S 159°57′E

Vavaea
- Ward
- Interactive map of Vavaea
- Country: Solomon Islands
- Island: Guadalcanal
- Time zone: UTC+11 (UTC)

Vavaea is a suburb of Honiara, Solomon Islands.
