= Steve Laore =

Solomon Islands politician (1964–2010)

The Right Honourable Steve Laore MP

Member of Parliament for Shortlands
- In office 4 August 2010 – 26 August 2010
- Preceded by: Augustine Taneko
- Succeeded by: Christopher Laore

Steve Eresi Laore (1963/1964 – 26 August 2010) was a Solomon Islands politician and member of parliament. Formerly a mechanic and businessman, and owner of a construction company, he defeated Augustine Taneko to become MP for the Shortlands constituency. He was a member of the Pacific Casino Hotel group that elevated Danny Philip to the position of prime minister. He had a wife, Samantha Laore, and the couple had three children.

On 26 August 2010, only 22 days after he took office, he collapsed at a dinner celebrating Philip's victory and was pronounced dead at the hospital. Laore's death left Philip with a majority of one in the Parliament. He was 46 at the time of his death.
