= Joseph Waleanisia =

Solomon Islands politician

Joseph Pius Waleanisia
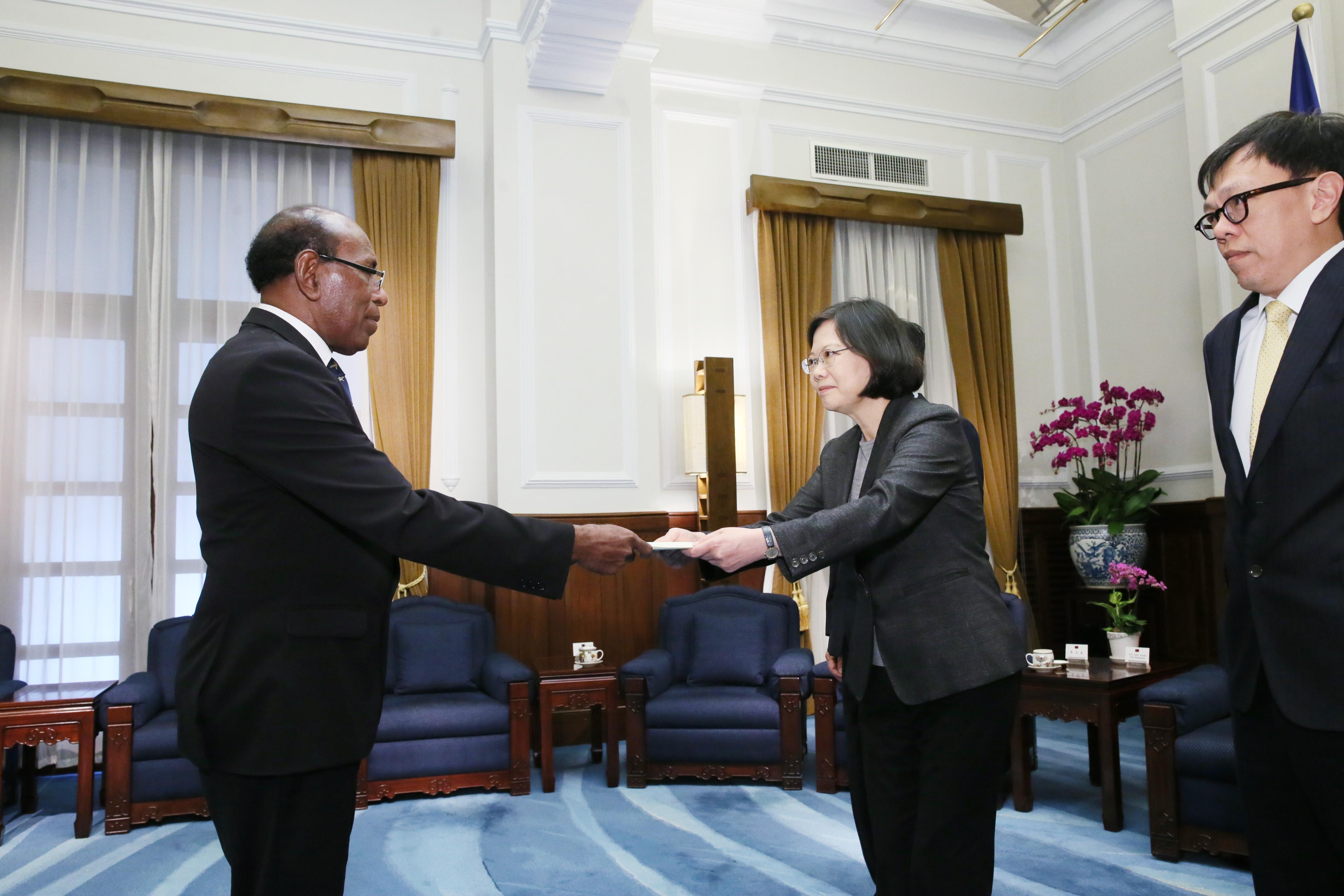
- President of the Taiwan, Tsai Ing-wen (middle) receives the credentials from the new Solomon Islands Ambassador to the ROC Joseph Pius Walaenisia (left) on 1 December 2016 at the Presidential Office Building in Taipei, capital of Taiwan.

Secretary to the Prime Minister

Ambassador of the Solomon Islands to Taiwan

Joseph Pius Waleanisia is a politician of the Solomon Islands who had served as the last ambassador to Taiwan until the rupture of diplomatic relations between both parties, as well as Secretary to the Prime Minister. The Chinese version of his name is "王哲夫".
