= Ownership, Unity and Responsibility Party =

Solomon Islands political party

- Leader: Jeremiah Manele
- Founder: Manasseh Sogavare
- Founded: 16 January 2010
- Ideology: Social conservatism Christian nationalism
- National Parliament: 15 / 50

Website
- ourpartysolomon.com (archived)

The Ownership, Unity and Responsibility Party (or OUR Party) is a political party in the Solomon Islands. It is headed by Jeremiah Manele and has competed in the 2010 and 2024 elections.

== History ==
=== 2010 establishment ===
The party was established on 17 December 2012 (and officially launched a month later) by the leader of the Opposition (and former Prime Minister) Manasseh Sogavare, and eight opposition MPs.

The party stated its intention to "invest $780 million over a period of four years in the rural economy from our own sources to improve the participation of our people in economic development". Provincial governments would be required to take an active part in rural development. It has also promised to consider whether it may be possible to restore customary ownership of land alienated for public purposes during the colonial era, notably in Honiara. In this respect, the party said it would be guided by the customary land ownership policy implemented in Vanuatu.

During the party's official launch mid-February, in Gizo, Sogavare added that, despite "millions of dollars worth of logs" exported from Western Province, landowners had received little in the way of revenue or improved government services. He later promised to address citizens' concerns about "the spill-over effects of the Bougainville crisis" on the maritime border with Papua New Guinea, and emphasised, that national unity was "one of the core pillars" of OUR Party.

Later, in the context of the campaign for the 2010 general election, Sogavare stated:

OUR Party is founded on Christian principles. OUR Party is committed to restore the ownership of this country to the people of Solomon Islands, both indigenous and naturalised. We are also committed to the course of national unity. We believe that we can only progress in developing our country if we are united and see each other as brothers and sisters. We are also committed to encouraging responsible leadership at all levels, including personal leadership. We are also committed to empowering our people through a development strategy that is people-centred, rural-focussed and growth-oriented.

Speaking in the party's name, he has also criticised the country's Truth and Reconciliation Commission, describing it as costly, excessively academic and guided by "foreign concepts", as opposed to more effective indigenous means of resolving conflicts and their aftermath. Party secretary general Patterson Oti stated in May 2010 that the party would decentralise development programmes, to empower the provinces. In June, Sogavare "pledged to commit 6.2 million US$ to help relocate victims of climate change" if the party won the election.

=== 2019 relaunch ===
Shortly after the 2019 general election, Sogavare relaunched the Ownership, Unity and Responsibility Party, Sogavare himself contest as an independent candidate, which after the 2019 elections decides to join the DCGA coalition. However, OUR Party was never registered to contest the 2019 elections.

=== 2024 election ===
In the lead up to the 2024 general election, OUR Party launched its manifesto on 8 February 2024. Prime Minister Sogavare announced the OUR Party's five most prioritised policies going into the election. The first was preserving social cohesion and the national unity to prevent ethnic tensions from rising, as in 2000. Enhancing the nation's legal and governing systems to guarantee public safety was another key priority, as was socio-economic growth; the party pledged to utilise the Australian Infrastructure Financing Facility for the Pacific, the Solomon Islands Infrastructure Program and China's Belt and Road Initiative. The OUR Party's fourth priority was national defence, security and trade; the party sought to preserve relations with Australia and other traditional allies while expanding ties with China as part of a "look north" policy. The fifth key priority was development and land and resources empowerment. During a campaign rally in the Malaitan provincial capital of Auki, Sogavare delivered a speech where he praised the Chinese political system and declared his government's decision to switch diplomatic ties from Taiwan to China to have "put Solomon Islands on the map". Sogavare also claimed that democracy leads to moral decline and same-sex marriage. After declining to contest the election for prime minister for an additional term, Sogavare announced that he would stand down as the OUR Party leader. He was succeeded by Jeremiah Manele.

== Election results ==
Election	Votes	%	Seats	+/–	Government
2010	24,138	10.24 (#2)	4 / 50	New	Opposition
2014	Did not contest		0 / 50	▼4	Extra-parliamentary
2019	Did not contest		0 / 50	0	Extra-parliamentary
2024	83,279	24.07 (#1)	15 / 50	▲15	Government (2024–2026)
2024	83,279	24.07 (#1)	15 / 50	▲15	Opposition (since 2026)
