= List of constituencies of the National Parliament of Solomon Islands =

Electoral constituencies of Solomon Islands

A map of the 50 constituencies, as of the 2019 general election.

There are 50 constituencies in Solomon Islands, each electing one Member of Parliament (MP) to the National Parliament. Elections are held every four years; the most recent took place on 17 April 2024.

== Constituencies ==
The following is the list of constituencies such as it was at the time of the 2006 general election, and the MP elected in each constituency.

Constituencies of the National Parliament of Solomon Islands
Constituency	Province	Electorate
Aoke-Langalanga	Malaita	7,365
Baegu-Asifola	Malaita	7,016
Central Guadalcanal	Guadalcanal	5,089
Central Honiara	Honiara City Council	19,539
Central Kwara'ae	Malaita	8,977
Central Makira	Malaita	4,722
East ꞌAreꞌare	Malaita	5,235
East Central Guadalcanal	Guadalcanal	5,896
East Choiseul	Choiseul	4,028
East Guadalcanal	Guadalcanal	6,230
East Honiara	Honiara City Council	30,049
East Kwaio	Malaita	8,856
East Makira	Makira	6,805
East Malaita	Malaita	6,379
Fataleka	Malaita	6,586
Gao-Bugotu	Isabel	
Gizo-Kolombangara	Western	
Hograno-Kia-Havulei	Isabel	
Lau Mbaelelea	Malaita	
Malaita Outer Islands	Malaita	
Maringe-Kokota	Isabel	
Marovo	Western	
Nggella	Central	
North East Guadalcanal	Guadalcanal	
North Guadalcanal	Guadalcanal	
North Malaita	Malaita	
North New Georgia	Western	
North Vella La Vella	Western	
North West Choiseul	Choiseul	
North West Guadalcanal	Guadalcanal	
Rannogga-Simbo	Western	
Rennell Bellona	Rennell Bellona	
Savo-Russells	Central	
Shortlands	Western	
South Choiseul	Choiseul	
South Guadalcanal	Guadalcanal	
Small Malaita	Malaita	
South New Georgia-Rendova-Tetepare	Western	
South Vella La Vella	Western	
Temotu Nende	Temotu	
Temotu Pele	Temotu	
Temotu Vatud	Temotu	
Ugi-Ulawa	Makira	
West ꞌAreꞌare	Malaita	
West Guadalcanal	Guadalcanal	
West Honiara	Honiara City Council	
West Kwaio	Malaita	
West Kwara'ae	Malaita	
West Makira	Makira	
West New Georgia - Vona Vona	Western	
