= Daniel Suidani =

Solomon Islands politician (1970–2025)

The Honourable Daniel Suidani
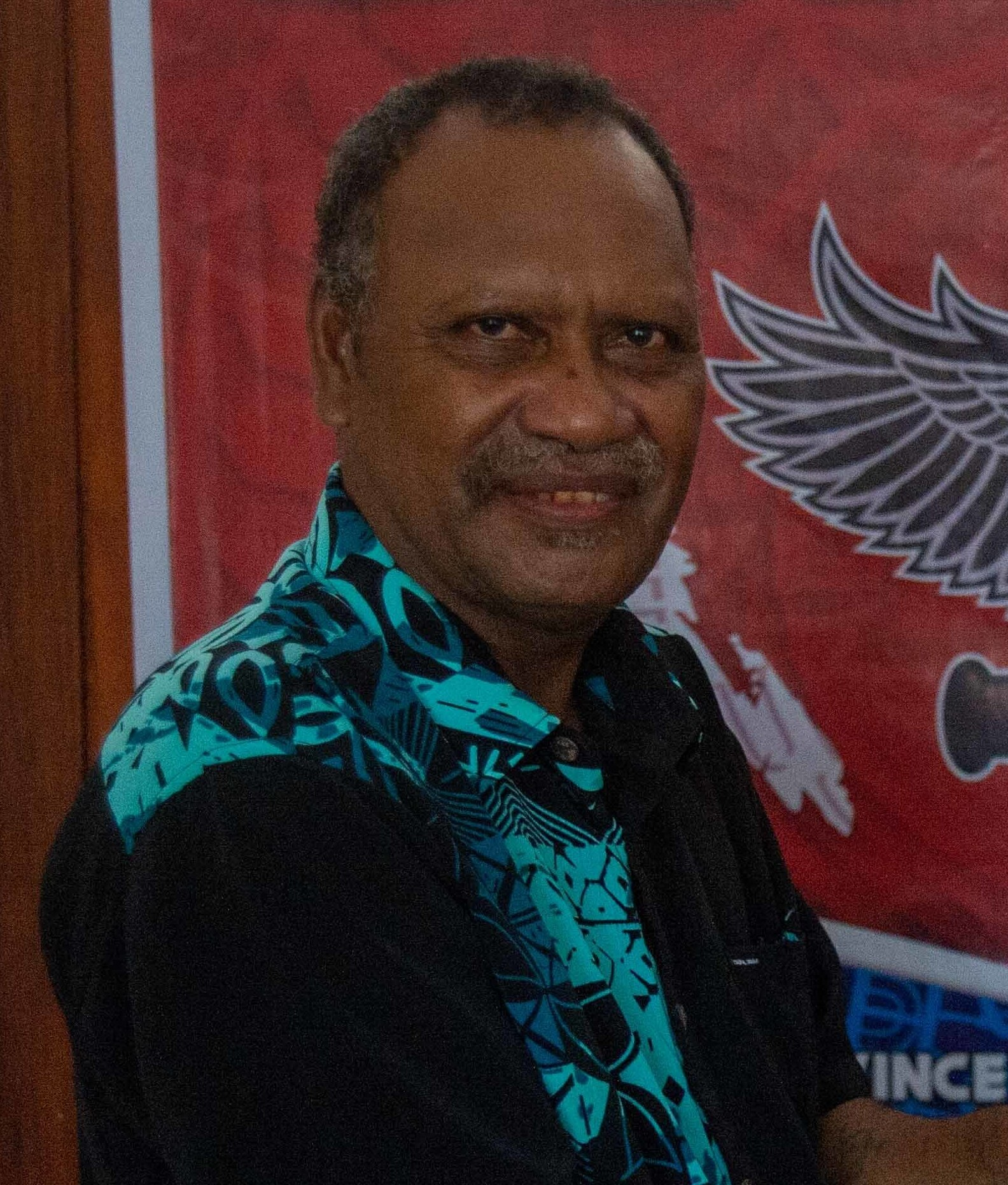
- Suidani in 2022

Premier of Malaita Province
- In office June 2019 – 7 February 2023
- Governors-General: Frank Kabui; David Vunagi
- Preceded by: Peter Ramohia
- Succeeded by: Martin Fini

Personal details
- Born: 1970 Malaita Province, Solomon Islands
- Died: 21 October 2025 (aged 55) Honiara, Solomon Islands
- Party: Umi for Change Party
- Spouse: Margaret Mini
- Education: Honiara Solomon Islands College of Higher Education

Daniel Suidani (1970 – 21 October 2025) was a Solomon Islander politician who served as the Premier of Malaita Province from June 2019 until his ousting in a no confidence vote in February 2023.

== Life and career ==
Suidani was born in 1970, on Malaita Island in Malaita Province. After graduating from the Honiara College of Higher Education at the age of 19, he initially worked as an elementary school teacher before switching to working for a timber and urban construction company.

During Suidani's tenure as Premier of Malaita Province, the Solomon Islands government officially switched diplomatic recognition from the Republic of China (Taiwan) to the People's Republic of China (China). Suidani was highly critical of this decision, alleging that the Chinese government offered bribes to him in exchange for political allegiance. Suidani has in turn been accused of accepting bribes from the Taiwanese government.

In 2020, Suidani held an independence referendum for Malaita Province, which was dismissed as illegitimate by the central government.

In October 2021, a motion of no confidence was filed against Suidani, but was withdrawn after protests erupted in support of him. He condemned international interference in the 2021 Solomon Islands unrest. On 7 February 2023, he was removed from office after a vote of no confidence from the provincial legislature.

In 2022, Suidani founded the Umi for Change Party.

In a letter dated 20 March 2023, the Solomon Islands government declared Suidani "unfit for office" due to his stand against China. National Minister for Provincial Government and Institutional Strengthening Rollen Seleso disqualified Suidani from holding his seat in the Malaita Provincial Assembly and the Speaker of the Malaita Provincial Assembly, Ronnie Butafa, was advised by the government to declare Suidani's seat – Ward 5 of Baegu-West Fataleka – officially vacant. Suidani and his supporters accused Prime Minister Manasseh Sogavare of being behind his ousting and vowed to appeal his ban from office. Afterwards protests broke out.

In 2024, Suidani was reelected to the seat in Malaita Provincial Assembly.

Suidani died at the National Referral Hospital in Honiara, on 21 October 2025, at the age of 55.
