= Solomon Islands Democratic Party =

- Leader: Matthew Wale
- Founded: October 2005
- National Parliament: 11 / 50

The Solomon Islands Democratic Party is a political party in Solomon Islands. In a country in which political parties tend to be small and transient, and to obtain very few seats in Parliament, the Democratic Party has played a comparatively major role in recent history.

== History ==
Gabriel Suri, a lawyer, founded the party in October 2005. It was to focus on "ethical leadership" for the country. Its general secretary, John Keniapisia, described that as a leadership founded on a relationship with God: "Political leadership is about nation building. Political leadership is also about God's calling for men & women to be involved in Kingdom building, here on earth, knowing that everything we do is a calling from God. Therefore we are answerable to Him. Our focus must be on things of eternal value. In everything we do, we must intent on doing it for the glory of God". The Democratic Party would also promote "indigenous rule", ensuring indigenous "control over the destiny of the country" and empowering "traditional decision making process[es]".

In the April 2006 general election, the party just obtained just three seats (out of fifty) in the National Parliament, with 4.9% of the vote. Nonetheless, when newly elected Prime Minister Snyder Rini resigned the following month in the face of a vote of no confidence, the Democrats joined Manasseh Sogavare's Grand Coalition for Change Government. In November 2007, the Democrats withdrew their support from Sogavare, supporting a successful motion of no confidence to oust him, and became a key part of new Prime Minister Derek Sikua's Coalition for National Unity and Rural Advancement government. The party gained a fourth member when it was joined by a sitting MP. Subsequent floor-crossing brought its number of MPs up to at least six.

In government under Sikua, the party was described as "instrumental" in ensuring the introduction of "significant reforms such as the Political Party Reform Bills, the establishment of the Truth and Reconciliation Commission, and the establishment of the taskforce team to undertake study for creation of an Independent Commission Against Corruption".

The party's general secretary, John Keniapisia, stated in 2009 that one of its main objectives were to "push for the country to develop a stronger relationship with God". He also supported the Political Parties Integrity Bill, in the name of "political stability".

Leading the Democrats into the August 2010 general election, party leader Steve Abana campaigned on a promise of "more recognition to tribal landowners by registering all tribal lands in the name of tribes"; "the implementation of a National Adaptation Plan to address climate change for the most vulnerable communities; a focus to improve the standard of living in villages consistent with the Millennium Development Goals"; a pledge "to ensure that 80 percent of energy in the country be produced from renewable resources"; and electoral reform to introduce preferential voting. The party's platform also included "push[ing] for the development of a national university based on Malaita", and developing economic and trade relations with the People's Republic of China, without departing from the country's diplomatic recognition of the Republic of China (Taiwan).

In the 2010 election, the Democratic Party became by far the largest single party in Parliament, winning thirteen seats out of fifty. (No other party obtained more than three seats.) Democratic MP and leader Steve Abana then sought to be elected Prime Minister by his peers. He succeeded in obtaining the votes of 23 MPs, but was defeated by Danny Philip (of the People's Progressive Party), who was elected with 26. Four days later, on 31 August, Abana officially became Leader of the Opposition, and appointed a Shadow Cabinet, in which Democrats held ten of the nineteen Shadow Ministries. Two other Democrats, however, had already defected to the government, obtaining positions in Prime Minister Philip's Cabinet; they were later joined by Stanley Sofu, who had been Abana's Shadow Minister for Infrastructure Development, but who accepted a position as Minister for Public Service. Thus, of the Democratic Party's thirteen MPs, nine were Shadow Ministers, two were Ministers, and the other two were backbenchers.

The party's National Executive during the lead-up to the 2010 election consisted in President John Ini Lapli, Vice-President Dr. Alice Pollard, Treasurer Gideon Zoleveke (Jnr), general secretary John Keniapisia and Party Leader Steve Abana.

In November 2011, the party renewed its leadership. Mathew Wale became party leader, while Dr. Alice Pollard became party president. At this stage, the party was still officially in Parliament, but had experienced "the defection of almost three-quarters" of its parliamentary members (including Steve Abana) to the government benches.

== Election results ==
Election	Votes	%	Seats	+/–
2006	9,338	4.89 (#5)	3 / 50	New
2010	24,719	10.49 (#1)	12 / 50	▲9
2014	Did not contest		0 / 50	▼12
2019	42,245	13.64 (#1)	8 / 50	▲8
2024	66,808	19.31 (#2)	11 / 50	▲3
