= People First Party (Solomon Islands) =

- Leader: Jimmie Rodgers
- Founded: 2014; 12 years ago
- National Parliament: 3 / 50

The People First Party is a political party in the Solomon Islands.

== History ==
From 2014 to 2024, it held one seat in the National Parliament of Solomon Islands, Chachabule Rebi Amoi from Marovo constituency.

In the 2024 Solomon Islands general election, three MPs were elected.

Constituency	MP
Marovo	Rebi Amoi
Rannogga/Simbo	Osopo Ghemu
South Vella La Vella	Frederick Kologeto

== Election results ==
Election	Votes	%	Seats	+/–
2014	11,601	4.51 (#4)	1 / 50	New
2019	11,419	3.69 (#7)	1 / 50	0
2024	11,045	3.19 (#6)	3 / 50	▲2
