= National Parliament of Solomon Islands =

National legislature of Solomon Islands

- 12th Parliament of Solomon Islands

Type
- Type: Unicameral

Leadership
- Speaker: Patteson Oti, OUR Party since 15 May 2019
- Prime Minister: Matthew Wale, SIDP since 15 May 2026
- Leader of the Opposition: Manasseh Sogavare, OUR Party since 20 May 2026

Structure
- Seats: 50
- Political groups: Government (11): SIDP (11); Opposition (28): OUR Party (15); UP (6); PFP (3); Kadere (1); DAP (1); U4C (1); SIPRA (1); Independent (11): Independent (11)
- Length of term: 4 years

Elections
- Voting system: First-past-the-post
- Last election: 17 April 2024

Meeting place
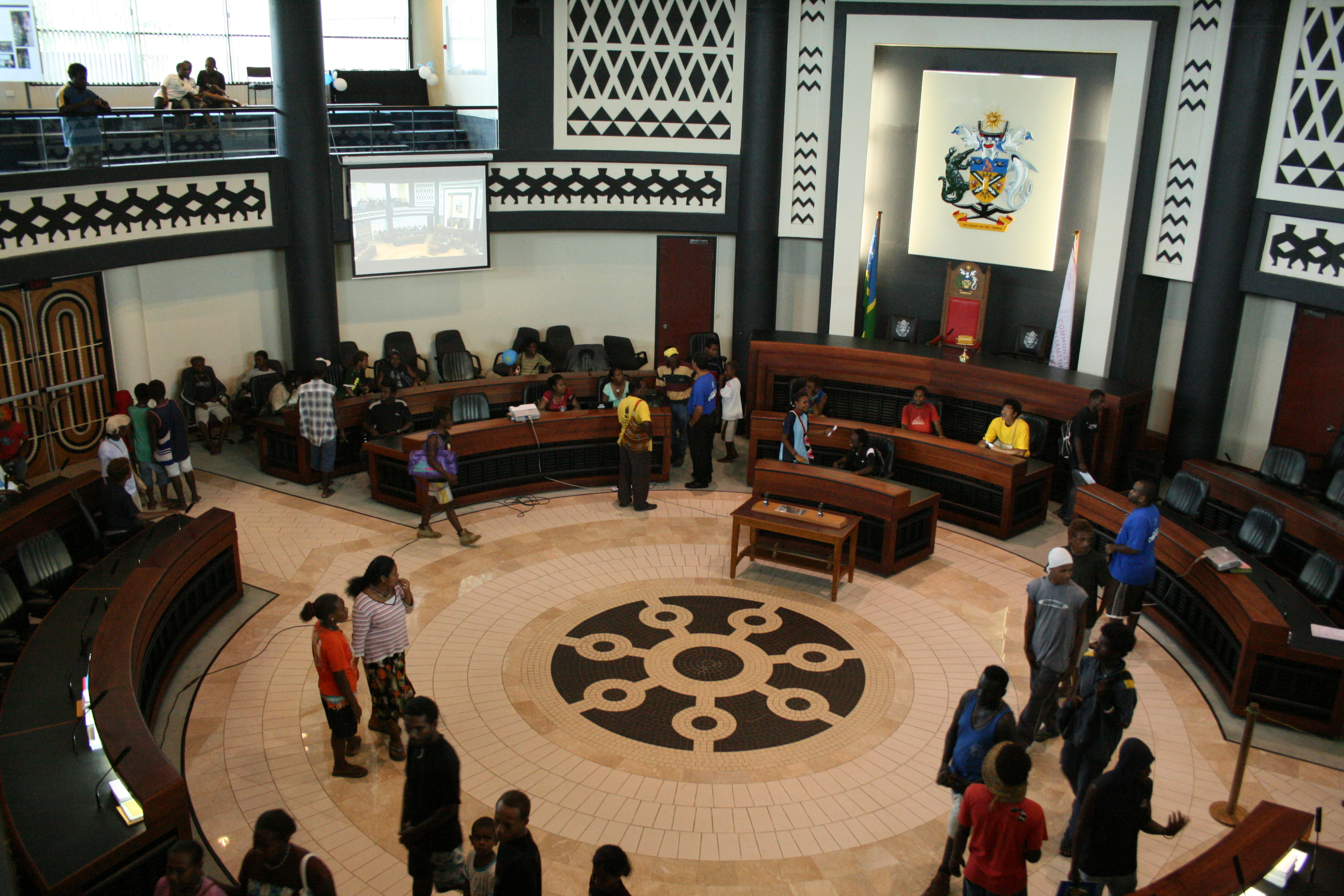
- Solomon Islands Parliament Building, Honiara

Website
- www.parliament.gov.sb

Constitution
- Constitution of the Solomon Islands

The National Parliament of Solomon Islands is the legislature of Solomon Islands. Its 50 members are elected for a four-year term in 50 single-seat constituencies.

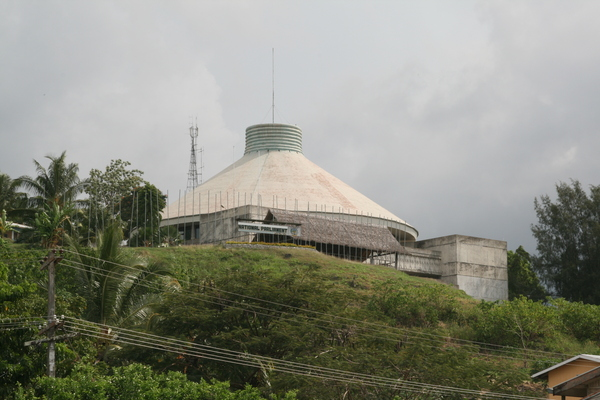
Solomon Islands Parliament Building

== Latest elections ==
Party	Votes	%	Seats	+/–
Ownership, Unity and Responsibility Party	83,280	24.07	15	New
Solomon Islands Democratic Party	66,808	19.31	11	+3
Solomon Islands United Party	46,662	13.48	6	+4
Kadere Party	16,906	4.89	1	–7
Solomon Islands Party for Rural Advancement	15,735	4.55	1	0
People First Party	11,045	3.19	3	+2
Umi for Change Party	10,389	3.00	1	New
People's Liberal Democratic Party	6,034	1.74	0	New
People's Alliance Party	5,593	1.62	0	–2
Democratic Alliance Party	5,515	1.59	1	–2
National Transformation Party	1,116	0.32	0	0
Green Party Solomon Islands	893	0.26	0	0
Solomon Islands Progressive Action Party	349	0.10	0	New
Independents	75,713	21.88	11	–10
Total	346,038	100.00	50	0
Valid votes	346,038	99.76		
Invalid/blank votes	844	0.24		
Total votes	346,882	100.00		
Registered voters/turnout	420,253	82.54		
Source: SIEC, SIBC, Solomon Islands Gazette

== See also ==
- List of constituencies of the National Parliament of Solomon Islands
- Legislative Council of the Solomon Islands
- Governing Council of the Solomon Islands
- List of members of the Solomon Islands Parliament who died in office
