= Central Guadalcanal constituency =

Solomon Islands parliamentary constituency

Central Guadalcanal
- Single-member constituency for the National Parliament of the Solomon Islands
- Region: Guadalcanal Province

Current constituency
- Created: 1973
- Current MP: Peter Shannel Agovaka
- Party: Independent

Central Guadalcanal is a single-member constituency of the National Parliament of the Solomon Islands. Established in 1973 when the Governing Council was expanded from 17 to 24 seats, it is located on the island of Guadalcanal.

== List of MPs ==
Term	MP	Party
1973–1976	David Thuguvoda	
1976–1980	Paul Joseph Tovua	
1980–1984	Paul Joseph Tovua	
1984–1989	Paul Joseph Tovua	
1989–1993	Paul Joseph Tovua	
1993–1997	Cain Eric Seri	
1997–2001	Walton Naezol	
2001–2006	Walton Naezol	
2006–2010	Peter Shannel Agovaka	
2010–2014	Peter Shannel Agovaka	Ownership, Unity and Responsibility Party
2014–	Peter Shannel Agovaka	Independent

== Election results ==
=== 2024 ===
2024 general election
Candidate	Party	Votes
Peter Shannel Agovaka	OUR	3,454
Rex Manengelea	Independent	1,592
Denni Denson	KAD	1,381
Celestin Seri	SID	1,224
Keioth Rubo	UP	243
Mivardo Tuanikebu	People's Liberal Democratic Party	65
Anitou Nihopara	Independent	49
Comelius Leni	Independent	13
Invalid/blank votes		30
Total		7,862
Registered voters		8,742

=== 2019 ===
2019 general election
Candidate	Party	Votes
Peter Shannel Agovaka	Independent	3,584
Walton Naezol	United Democratic Party	2,978
Peter Isaac	Independent	911
Silas Anesaia	Independent	22
Jacobeth Maneiria	DAP	20
Invalid/blank votes		34
Total		7,515
Registered voters		8,150

=== 2014 ===
2014 general election
Candidate	Party	Votes
Peter Shannel Agovaka	Independent	2,083
Walton Naezol	United Democratic Party	1,446
Ribson Nunua Tinbaku	Independent	697
Patrick Kennedy	Direct Development Party	270
Noelyne Biliki	People's Alliance Party	114
Elvish Kekegolo	Pan-Melanesian Congress Party	91
Matilda Tosa Elta	National Transformation Party	78
George Solomon Sovekibo	Independent	52
Brendan Muna	Independent	47
Invalid/blank votes		20
Total		
Registered voters		
Source: Election Passport

=== 2010 ===
2010 general election
Candidate	Party	Votes
Peter Shannel Agovaka	Ownership, Unity and Responsibility Party	2,526
Walton Naezol	Independent	2,025
Invalid/blank votes		58
Total		4,609
Registered voters		6,829
Source: Election Passport

=== 2009 ===
2009 by-election
Candidate	Party	Votes
Peter Shannel Agovaka		2,089
Walton Naezol		1,291
Elvish Kekegolo		170
Invalid/blank votes		51
Total		3,601
Registered voters		
Source: Election Passport

=== 2006 ===
2006 general election
Candidate	Party	Votes
Peter Shannel Agovaka		1,124
Walton Naezol		966
Noveti Napter		490
Wilson Weston Suhara		467
Whitlam Kikolo		300
Simon Tonavi		163
Paul Berry Voromate		39
Invalid/blank votes		21
Total		3,570
Registered voters		5,089
Source: Election Passport

=== 2001 ===
2001 general election
Candidate	Party	Votes
Walton Naezol		1,364
Napter N Lui		532
Peter Shannel Agovaka		515
Justice Denni		383
Bernard Teli		333
Invalid/blank votes		
Total		3,127
Registered voters		5,042
Source: Election Passport

=== 1997 ===
1997 general election
Candidate	Party	Votes
Walton Naezol		1,246
Joash Salani		406
Haniel Miniti		394
Willie Ronnie		359
Clement Jimmy Natei		322
Michael Kelly		262
Jeriel Watson Mani		229
Allan Moses Telei		129
Invalid/blank votes		
Total		3,347
Registered voters		4,584
Source: Election Passport

=== 1993 ===
1993 general election
Candidate	Party	Votes
Cain Eric Seri		827
Joseph Bobby Naesol		804
Paul Joseph Tovua		656
David Kafaikao		242
Invalid/blank votes		
Total		2,529
Registered voters		3,477
Source: Election Passport

=== 1989 ===
1989 general election
Candidate	Party	Votes
Paul Joseph Tovua		757
Cain Eric Seri		604
Francis Manengelea		441
David Balue		336
Jim Vokia		133
Invalid/blank votes		
Total		2,271
Registered voters		3,525
Source: Election Passport

=== 1984 ===
1984 general election
Candidate	Party	Votes
Paul Joseph Tovua		473
Samuel Topilu		401
Sam Nesa Chamatete		349
Cain Eric Seri		263
Walter Vaghi		134
Invalid/blank votes		
Total		1,620
Registered voters		
Source: Election Passport

=== 1980 ===
1980 general election
Candidate	Party	Votes
Paul Joseph Tovua		608
Francis George Labu		244
Samuel Topilu		196
Sam Nesa Chamatete		167
M. J. Koba		86
Jim Vokia		59
Invalid/blank votes		
Total		1,360
Registered voters		3,427
Source: Election Passport

=== 1976 ===
1976 general election
Candidate	Party	Votes
Paul Joseph Tovua		408
Moses Albert Rere		228
Mark Manapasege		190
Belden Aghi		123
Invalid/blank votes		
Total		949
Registered voters		
Source: Election Passport

=== 1973 ===
1973 general election
Candidate	Party	Votes
David Thuguvoda		618
Alfred Maeke		507
Moses Albert Rere		191
Allan Billy Masedi		181
Invalid/blank votes		
Total		1,497
Registered voters		
Source: Election Passport
