= East ꞌAreꞌare constituency =

East ꞌAreꞌare
- Single-member constituency for the National Parliament of the Solomon Islands
- Region: Malaita Province

Current constituency
- Created: 1976
- Created from: ꞌAreꞌare
- Current MP: Peter Kenilorea Jr.
- Party: Solomon Islands United Party

East ꞌAreꞌare is a single-member constituency of the National Parliament of Solomon Islands. Established in 1976 when the Legislative Assembly was expanded from 24 to 38 seats, it is located on the island of Malaita.

== List of MPs ==
Election	MP	Party
1976	Peter Kenilorea	United Party
1980	Peter Kenilorea	United Party
1984	Peter Kenilorea	United Party
1989	Peter Kenilorea	United Party
1993	Edward Huni'ehu	
1997	Dickson Warakohia	
2001	Edward Huni'ehu	
2006	Edward Huni'ehu	
2010	Andrew Hanaria Keniasina	Independent
2014	Andrew Manepora'a	Kadere Party
2019	Peter Kenilorea Jr.	United Party
2024	Peter Kenilorea Jr.	United Party

== Election results ==
=== 2014 ===
2014 general election
Candidate	Party	Votes
Andrew Manepora'a	Kadere Party	2,378
Andrew Hanaria Keniasina	Independent	1,913
Edward Jacob Ronia	New Nation Party	194
John Maxwell Harunari	People's Alliance Party	79
Invalid/blank votes		20
Total		
Registered voters		
Source: Election Passport

=== 2012 ===
2012 by-election
Candidate	Party	Votes
Andrew Manepora'a		2,157
Aliki Tokii Ha'apio		1,228
Peter Kenilorea		460
Claudius Horiwapu		152
Invalid/blank votes		
Total		3,997
Registered voters		6,575
Source: Election Passport

=== 2010 ===
2010 general election
Candidate	Party	Votes
Andrew Hanaria Keniasina		1,000
Aliki Tokii Ha'apio		947
Andrew Manepora'a		903
Abraham Namokari		792
Michael Ahikau		628
Brian Aonima		274
Joseph Hatamane Ririmae		54
Jerry Haipora Terenihona		3
Invalid/blank votes		11
Total		4,611
Registered voters		6,651
Source: Election Passport

=== 2006 ===
2006 general election
Candidate	Party	Votes
Edward Huni'ehu		882
Michael Ahikau		726
Abraham Namokari		497
Dickson Warakohia		489
Peter Maeatua		390
Francis Hoasipua		135
Michael Wairamo		101
Alphonsus Nori		77
Jezreel Loaloa		59
Jerry Haipora Terenihona		10
Invalid/blank votes		21
Total		3,366
Registered voters		5,235
Source: Election Passport

=== 2001 ===
2001 general election
Candidate	Party	Votes
Edward Huni'ehu		804
Michael Ahikau		795
Dickson Warokohia		719
Michael Wairamo		666
Brian S Taba'a		418
Benjamin Harohau		110
James Nihopara		50
Jerry Haipora Terenihona		23
Invalid/blank votes		
Total		3,585
Registered voters		4,754
Source: Election Passport

=== 1997 ===
1997 general election
Candidate	Party	Votes
Dickson Warakohia		678
Andrew Hanaria Keniasina		601
Edward Huni'ehu		570
Solomon Manata		252
James Nihopara		173
Invalid/blank votes		
Total		2,274
Registered voters		3,280
Source: Election Passport

=== 1993 ===
1993 general election
Candidate	Party	Votes
Edward Huni'ehu		909
Michael Wairamo		366
Joe Kennedy		274
Andrew Hanaria Keniasina		204
Invalid/blank votes		
Total		1,753
Registered voters		2,724
Source: Election Passport

=== 1992 ===
1992 by-election
Candidate	Party	Votes
Edward Huni'ehu		558
Joash Ridley Waihura		237
Solomon Manata		213
Arsene Waia		160
Haniel Omokirio		46
Invalid/blank votes		
Total		1,214
Registered voters		
Source: Election Passport

=== 1989 ===
1989 general election
Candidate	Party	Votes
Peter Kenilorea		1,000
Edward Huni'ehu		460
Donation Ha'apu		102
Arsene Waia		12
Invalid/blank votes		
Total		1,574
Registered voters		2,452
Source: Election Passport

=== 1984 ===
1984 general election
Candidate	Party	Votes
Peter Kenilorea		1,016
Alphonsus Nori		220
Invalid/blank votes		
Total		1,236
Registered voters		
Source: Election Passport

=== 1980 ===
1980 general election
Candidate	Party	Votes
Peter Kenilorea		816
F. G. Anohere		171
Invalid/blank votes		
Total		987
Registered voters		1,313
Source: Election Passport

=== 1976 ===
1976 general election
Candidate	Party	Votes
Peter Kenilorea		Unopposed
Invalid/blank votes		–
Total		–
Registered voters		
Source: Election Passport
