= Independent Group (Solomon Islands) =

The Independent Group (IG) is a political faction in the Solomon Islands comprising the independent members of the Solomon Islands Parliament.

== History ==
The formation of the Independent Group began in 1974 during the election of the first Chief Minister, and became a formal group towards the end of 1976 by supporters of Solomon Mamaloni and Francis Aqorau after they had left the Coalition Opposition Group led by Bartholomew Ulufa'alu.

In the 1976 general elections the Independent Group emerged as the largest faction in the Legislative Assembly, winning 15 of the 38 seats, and supported Peter Kenilorea in his successful bid to become Chief Minister.

Despite claiming not to be a political party, the group issued a manifesto for the 1980 elections. Following the elections, it joined the Solomon Islands United Party-led coalition government with Kenilorea as Prime Minister and IG leader Francis Billy Hilly becoming Deputy Prime Minister; the Independent Group was also given six seats in the 12-member cabinet.

In 1981 the IG pulled out of the coalition, causing the government to fall. Most of its MPs voted for the People's Alliance Party's Mamaloni in the subsequent election for Prime Minister, and subsequently joined the PAP-led coalition government, being given four cabinet posts.
