= Tony Harihiru =

Solomon Islands politician (died 1986)

Minister of National Economic Planning
- In office 1984–1986
- Succeeded by: Robert Bera

Minister of Works and Public Utilities
- In office 1980–1984
- Succeeded by: John Tepaika

Member of the National Parliament
- In office 1980–1986
- Preceded by: Emilio Li'I Ouou
- Constituency: Small Malaita

Personal details
- Born: Tarapaina, Solomon Islands
- Died: June 1986 (aged 39)
- Political party: SIUP

Emmanuel Tony Harihiru (died June 1986) was a Solomon Islands politician. He served as a member of the National Parliament from 1980 until his death, and was Minister of Works and Public Utilities and Minister of National Economic Planning.

== Biography ==
Harihiru was born in Tarapaina in Malaita Province and studied business studies at the University of the South Pacific.

A member of the Solomon Islands United Party, he contested the Small Malaita seat in the 1980 general elections and was elected to Parliament. He was subsequently appointed Minister of Works and Public Utilities by Prime Minister Peter Kenilorea. After being re-elected in 1984, he was appointed Minister of National Economic Planning. However, he died in June 1986 after a brief illness at the age of 39. He was survived by his wife and four children.
