= Edward Huni'ehu =

Solomon Islands politician (1956–2010)

Edward Huni'ehu (January 1, 1956 – April 12, 2010) was a Solomon Islands politician.

He graduated from the Solomon Islands College of Higher Education.

He was first elected to the National Parliament in a by-election in 1992 (following Sir Peter Kenilorea's resignation from Parliament), representing the East ꞌAreꞌare constituency in Malaita Province. He kept his seat in the general election in 1993, temporarily left politics in 1997, returned to Parliament in 2001, and was re-elected in 2006.

He served as a minister in government on numerous occasions. He was minister for commerce during his first year in Parliament, under Prime Minister Solomon Mamaloni, then minister for transport, works and utilities throughout his first full term in Parliament (1993–1997), under Francis Billy Hilly then Solomon Mamaloni again. He then briefly became Leader of the Opposition to Mamaloni's government in 1997. At the end of that term, he "exit[ed] politics for a while to focus on personal plans", but returned for the 2001 election, during which he regained his temporarily vacated seat. After the 2001 election, he was appointed minister for agriculture and livestock by new prime minister Sir Allan Kemakeza, a position which he held from 19 December 2001 to 17 December 2002. On 21 April 2006, new prime minister Snyder Rini appointed him minister for education and human resources development; he held the position until the Rini government resigned on 4 May. On 22 December 2007, new prime minister Derek Sikua appointed him minister for energy, mines and rural electification, "in recognition of his efforts to ensure the development of alternative energy in Solomon Islands, especially in hydro and solar power for rural villages". He resigned due to ill health in 2009, and sat as a backbencher until his death. He was, at least during his final term, a member of the Association of Independent Members of Parliament.

He died on 12 April 2010 at the National Referral Hospital in Honiara "after a long battle with diabetes". He was buried "in his home village of Manawai" in his constituency.
