= 1976 Solomon Islands general election =

General elections were held in the Solomon Islands on 22 June 1976. Although contested by three political parties (the People's Progressive Party, the National Democratic Party and the Melanesian Action Party), the Independent Group emerged as the largest group in the Legislative Assembly, and elected Peter Kenilorea Chief Minister.

== Results ==
A total of 177 candidates contested the elections. Only fourteen incumbent MLAs were re-elected, with two ministers – David Thuguvoda and Ashley Wickham – losing their seats. Kenilorea was elected unopposed in East ꞌAreꞌare.

The Independent Group won 15 of the 38 seats, with the National Democratic Party winning eight.

Constituency	Candidate	Votes	%	Notes
Central Guadalcanal	Paul Joseph Tovua	408	43.00	Elected
Central Guadalcanal	Moses Albert Rere	228	24.00	
Central Guadalcanal	Mark Manapasege	190	20.00	
Central Guadalcanal	Belden Aghi	123	13.00	
Central Malaita	Collin Gauwane	376	31.90	Re-elected
Central Malaita	Abraham Baeanisia	221	18.70	
Central Malaita	George Maelalo	193	16.40	
Central Malaita	Alfred Maetia	188	15.90	
Central Malaita	Francis Joseph Saemala	108	9.20	
Central Malaita	Francis Walelia	59	5.00	
Central Malaita	Martin Anifasipetele	34	2.90	
East ꞌAreꞌare	Peter Kenilorea	—	—	Elected unopposed
East Guadalcanal	David Valusa	438	30.90	Elected
East Guadalcanal	Sukuatu Malakia	362	25.60	
East Guadalcanal	Joel Kikolo	245	17.30	
East Guadalcanal	Sam Iko	161	11.40	
East Guadalcanal	Donasiano Pororasu	132	9.30	
East Guadalcanal	Salathiel Lence Roger	78	5.50	
East Honiara	Batholomew Ulufa'alu	613	61.20	Elected
East Honiara	Peter J. Salaka	331	33.00	
East Honiara	Paul Buarua	58	5.80	
East Isabel	Francis Reginald Kikolo	444	26.90	Re-elected
East Isabel	Douglas Feitei	327	19.80	
East Isabel	Daniel Denys Maile	262	15.90	
East Isabel	Moses Mahomed Razak	249	15.10	
East Isabel	Cullwick Maneguasa Vahia	145	8.80	
East Isabel	Benjamin Tivo Zeva	120	7.30	
East Isabel	Alfred Charles Bugoro	105	6.40	
East Kwaio	Jonathan Fifii	849	75.30	Re-elected
East Kwaio	John Fisango	278	24.70	
East Makira	Benedict Kinika	779	38.60	Re-elected
East Makira	Geoffrey Kuper	498	24.70	
East Makira	Macpherson Mwara	444	22.00	
East Makira	Elijah Koke	121	6.00	
East Makira	Daniel Kuata	115	5.70	
East Makira	Beato Tora	63	3.10	
East Malaita	Faneta Sira	238	18.90	Elected
East Malaita	John Maetia Kaliuae	201	15.90	
East Malaita	Leslie Fugui	168	13.30	Unseated
East Malaita	Ben Gale	157	12.50	
East Malaita	Appallosi Siosi	127	10.10	
East Malaita	Jack Inifiri	107	8.50	
East Malaita	Saeti Saefafia	85	6.70	
East Malaita	Charles Luiramo	67	5.30	
East Malaita	Billy Fa'arobo	62	4.90	
East Malaita	Barnabas Kona	49	3.90	
First Eastern Outer Islands	Moffat Bonunga	827	63.80	Re-elected
First Eastern Outer Islands	Matthew Leuba	200	15.40	
First Eastern Outer Islands	Ambrose Langosa	140	10.80	
First Eastern Outer Islands	Santas Paikai	130	10.00	
Gizo/Kolombangara	Lawry Eddie Wickham	410	46.90	Elected
Gizo/Kolombangara	George Ngumi	321	36.70	Unseated
Gizo/Kolombangara	Aquila Talasasa	108	12.30	
Gizo/Kolombangara	Anthony Ramoi	36	4.10	
Lau/Mbaelelea	Mariano Kelesi	315	21.00	Elected
Lau/Mbaelelea	George Suri Kwanae	195	13.00	
Lau/Mbaelelea	Ratu Wayne Sade Afu	164	10.90	
Lau/Mbaelelea	Jeriel Ofea Ausuta	128	8.50	
Lau/Mbaelelea	Mahlon Kwalofau	125	8.30	
Lau/Mbaelelea	Philip Solodia	115	7.70	Unseated
Lau/Mbaelelea	Samuel Ragosomani	110	7.30	
Lau/Mbaelelea	Colin Bentley	80	5.30	
Lau/Mbaelelea	Hadley Toata	77	5.10	
Lau/Mbaelelea	Stephen Pita	67	4.50	
Lau/Mbaelelea	John Ratu Daofainia	56	3.70	
Lau/Mbaelelea	Baddeley Koutu	39	2.60	
Lau/Mbaelelea	Festus Kenileana	30	2.00	
Malaita Outer Islands	Johnson Kengalu	183	45.80	Elected
Malaita Outer Islands	Abraham Kapei	170	42.50	
Malaita Outer Islands	Johnson Siota	47	11.80	
Marovo	Pulepada Ghemu	531	67.60	Re-elected
Marovo	Harold Penny	254	32.40	
Nggela	Ben Tumulima	553	31.40	Elected
Nggela	James Loti	381	21.60	
Nggela	Dudley Gorosi	318	18.10	
Nggela	Richard Harper	204	11.60	
Nggela	Robert Pule	160	9.10	
Nggela	John Plant Salini	79	4.50	
Nggela	Matthew Kuri	66	3.70	
North Choiseul	Gideon Zoleveke	472	58.30	Re-elected
North Choiseul	Luke Pitakoe	337	41.70	
North East Guadalcanal (old)	Waeta Ben	782	83.70	Re-elected
North East Guadalcanal (old)	David Kauli	152	16.30	
North Guadalcanal	Philip Kapini	412	30.60	Elected
North Guadalcanal	Alfred Maeke	368	27.30	
North Guadalcanal	David Thuguvoda	247	18.30	Unseated
North Guadalcanal	Alfred Thugea	123	9.10	
North Guadalcanal	Stephen Matagu	122	9.10	
North Guadalcanal	Michael Mose	76	5.60	
North West Malaita	Joseph Taega	213	24.50	Elected
North West Malaita	Moffat Maena	163	18.80	
North West Malaita	Ishmael Bobby	132	15.20	
North West Malaita	Bartholomew Riolo Okesi	121	13.90	
North West Malaita	Mahion Dofai	75	8.60	
North West Malaita	Leonard Maenuna	71	8.20	
North West Malaita	Dominic Surioa	56	6.40	
North West Malaita	Augustine Maelfodola	38	4.40	
Ranongga/Simbo	Francis Billy Hilly	400	41.40	Elected
Ranongga/Simbo	Nelson Mamipitu	195	20.20	
Ranongga/Simbo	Patterson Runikera	148	15.30	
Ranongga/Simbo	Bruce Ragoso	121	12.50	
Ranongga/Simbo	Josiah Kunduru	103	10.70	
Rennell/Bellona	John Tepaika	563	77.20	Elected
Rennell/Bellona	John Mike Sau	119	16.30	
Rennell/Bellona	Leonard Kaitu'u	47	6.40	
Roviana and North New Georgia	Geoffrey Opokana Beti	754	73.80	Elected
Roviana and North New Georgia	Alphonse Daga	160	15.70	
Roviana and North New Georgia	Simeon Paza Makini	107	10.50	
Russells/Savo	Peter Manetiva	559	47.50	Elected
Russells/Savo	John Baptist Tura	331	28.10	
Russells/Savo	Mark Vaka	287	24.40	
Second Eastern Outer Islands	John Melanoli	397	29.10	Elected
Second Eastern Outer Islands	James Santa	253	18.60	
Second Eastern Outer Islands	John Mealue	238	17.50	
Second Eastern Outer Islands	Father Brock	214	15.70	
Second Eastern Outer Islands	Ataban M Tropa	211	15.50	
Second Eastern Outer Islands	David Dawea Taukalo	49	3.60	
Shortland	Remesio Eresi	338	53.70	Elected
Shortland	Edward Kingmele	167	26.50	
Shortland	Lester Sogah Bule	125	19.80	
Small Malaita	Emilio Li'I Ouou	995	54.00	Re-elected
Small Malaita	Anthony Saru	419	22.70	
Small Malaita	David Lilimae	221	12.00	
Small Malaita	Peter Mamani	207	11.20	
South Choiseul	Jason Dorovolomo	457	38.00	Elected
South Choiseul	Joini Tutua	329	27.30	
South Choiseul	Lemech Dorovoqa	222	18.50	
South Choiseul	Binet Gadebeta	129	10.70	
South Choiseul	Stainer Pitaduna	66	5.50	
South Guadalcanal	Sethuel Kelly	682	40.60	Elected
South Guadalcanal	Stephen Cheka	518	30.90	Unseated
South Guadalcanal	George Wilson Mangale	279	16.60	
South Guadalcanal	Wilson Low	199	11.90	
Ulawa/Ugi	Daniel Ho'ota	375	48.60	Elected
Ulawa/Ugi	Andrew Mamau	183	23.70	
Ulawa/Ugi	Thomas Titiulu	157	20.40	
Ulawa/Ugi	Michael Umaleo	56	7.30	
Vella Lavella	Andrew Kukuti	440	34.90	Re-elected
Vella Lavella	Gilbert Pana	349	27.70	
Vella Lavella	Tommy Rausu	215	17.00	
Vella Lavella	George Talasasa	137	10.90	
Vella Lavella	Howard Viuru	66	5.20	
Vella Lavella	Rodi Mesipitu	55	4.40	
Vona Vona/Rendova/Tetepari	Francis Milton Angarau	346	34.10	Elected
Vona Vona/Rendova/Tetepari	Samuel Kuku	335	33.00	
Vona Vona/Rendova/Tetepari	Darcy Everett Lilo	200	19.70	
Vona Vona/Rendova/Tetepari	Milton Sale	134	13.20	
West ꞌAreꞌare	David Kausimae	554	52.30	Re-elected
West ꞌAreꞌare	Michael Oritaimae	386	36.40	
West ꞌAreꞌare	Romano Toreitoro	119	11.20	
West Guadalcanal	Matthew Belamataga	556	31.70	Re-elected
West Guadalcanal	Leonard Ashley Sydenham	306	17.40	
West Guadalcanal	Bartholomew Buchanan	305	17.40	
West Guadalcanal	Orlie Torling	283	16.10	
West Guadalcanal	Savino Kokopu	153	8.70	
West Guadalcanal	Francis George Labu	152	8.70	
West Honiara	Nathan Wate	299	30.80	Elected
West Honiara	Ronald Alexander Lawson	275	28.30	
West Honiara	Warren Paia	243	25.00	
West Honiara	Ashley Wickham	155	15.90	Unseated
West Isabel	Willie Betu	1,005	58.10	Re-elected
West Isabel	Dennis Carlos Lulei	725	41.90	
West Kwaio	Henry Tom	296	39.90	Elected
West Kwaio	George Luialamo	218	29.40	
West Kwaio	Paul Andrew Foasi	145	19.50	
West Kwaio	John Ale	83	11.20	
West Kwara'ae	John Richardson Garea	604	44.60	Elected
West Kwara'ae	Alan Taki	280	20.70	
West Kwara'ae	Bill Dolarii	107	7.90	
West Kwara'ae	Clement Kiriau Ofai	91	6.70	
West Kwara'ae	Fred Maedola	87	6.40	
West Kwara'ae	Andrew Adifaka	62	4.60	
West Kwara'ae	Rickimae Alufafia	56	4.10	
West Kwara'ae	Edward John Filiau	36	2.70	
West Kwara'ae	Timeous Teioli	31	2.30	
West Makira	Solomon S. Mamaloni	1,092	80.90	Re-elected
West Makira	John Marahora	258	19.10	

== Aftermath ==
Following the elections, the Legislative Assembly elected the Chief Minister in mid-July, with Kenilorea defeating incumbent Chief Minister Solomon Mamaloni by 21 votes to 16 in the seventh round of voting. Kenilorea subsequently formed a new Council of Ministers.

Position	Minister
Chief Minister	Peter Kenilorea
Minister for Agriculture and Land	Sethuel Kelly
Minister for Education and Cultural Affairs	Mariano Kelesi
Minister for Finance	Benedict Kinika
Minister for Foreign Trade, Industry and Labour	Pulepada Ghemu
Minister for Health and Welfare	Daniel Ho'ota
Minister of Home Affairs	Francis Billy Hilly
Minister for Works and Public Utilities	John Tepaika
