= Solomon Islands Liberal Party =

Former political party in Solomon Islands

The Solomon Islands Liberal Party (SILP) was a political party in the Solomon Islands.

== History ==
The party was established as the Nationalist Party in 1975, before becoming the National Democratic Party (NADEPA). Its founders, Joses Tuhanuku and Bartholomew Ulufa'alu, were trade union leaders, with Tuhanuku heading the Solomon Islands General Workers' Union. It won eight of the 38 seats in the 1976 general elections. It was reduced to two seats in the 1980 elections and one seat in the 1984 elections.

In 1986, the party was renamed the Solomon Islands Liberal Party; a split later saw Tuhanuku leave to form the Solomon Islands Labour Party in 1988. In the 1989 elections, it won two seats, but lost both in the 1993 elections. It won four seats in the 1997 elections, in which it was part of the Solomon Islands Alliance for Change. The alliance parties won a narrow majority in Parliament and Ulufa'alu became prime minister. The alliance lost power as a result of the 2001 elections, which saw it win only 12 of the 50 seats, of which the SILP took two.

The party won two seats in the 2006 elections, and one in the 2010 elections, with Prime Minister Derek Sikua being its sole successful candidate in North East Guadalcanal. It didn't contest the 2014 elections.
