= 1989 Solomon Islands general election =

- 22 February 1989
- All 38 seats in the National Parliament; 19 seats needed for a majority
Party	Leader	Vote %	Seats	+/–
People's Alliance	Solomon Mamaloni	22.93	11	+1
Liberal Party	Bartholomew Ulufa'alu	9.53	4	+3
NFP		8.95	4	New
Labour		8.44	2	New
United Party	Peter Kenilorea	6.59	4	−9
Independents	–	43.56	13	+4
This lists parties that won seats. See the complete results below.
Prime Minister before	Prime Minister after
Ezekiel Alebua; United Party	Solomon Mamaloni; People's Alliance

General elections were held in the Solomon Islands on 22 February 1989. A total of 257 candidates contested the election, the result of which was a victory for the People's Alliance Party, which won 11 of the 38 seats.

== Results ==
Party	Votes	%	Seats	+/–
People's Alliance Party	18,591	22.93	11	+1
Solomon Islands Liberal Party	7,732	9.53	4	+3
National Front for Progress	7,259	8.95	4	New
Solomon Islands Labour Party	6,846	8.44	2	New
Solomon Islands United Party	5,342	6.59	4	−9
Independents	35,323	43.56	13	+4
Total	81,093	100.00	38	0
Registered voters/turnout	130,805	–		
Source: Solomon Islands Election Resources

=== By constituency ===
Constituency	Electorate	Candidate	Party	Votes	%	Notes
Central Guadalcanal	3,525	Paul Joseph Tovua	Solomon Islands United Party	757	33.33	Re-elected
Central Guadalcanal	3,525	Cain Eric Seri	People's Alliance Party	604	26.60	
Central Guadalcanal	3,525	Francis Manengelea	Solomon Islands Labour Party	441	19.42	
Central Guadalcanal	3,525	David Balue	Independent	336	14.80	
Central Guadalcanal	3,525	Jim Vokia	Solomon Islands Liberal Party	133	5.86	
Central Malaita	3,945	Francis Joseph Saemala	Independent	658	28.48	Elected
Central Malaita	3,945	John Paul Dio	Independent	500	21.65	
Central Malaita	3,945	Adrian Bataiofesi	Solomon Islands Liberal Party	476	20.61	Unseated
Central Malaita	3,945	Walton Willy Abuito'o	People's Alliance Party	371	16.06	
Central Malaita	3,945	Harold Maomatekwa	Independent	138	5.97	
Central Malaita	3,945	David Thomas Maeigoa	Solomon Islands Labour Party	76	3.29	
Central Malaita	3,945	Robertson Buaite'e	Independent	42	1.82	
Central Malaita	3,945	David Fox Folomane	Independent	21	0.91	
Central Malaita	3,945	Edwin Misi	Independent	19	0.82	
Central Malaita	3,945	Frank Fosala	Independent	9	0.39	
East ꞌAreꞌare	2,452	Peter Kenilorea	Solomon Islands United Party	1,000	63.53	Re-elected
East ꞌAreꞌare	2,452	Edward Huniehu	Solomon Islands Liberal Party	460	29.22	
East ꞌAreꞌare	2,452	Donation Ha'apu	Solomon Islands Labour Party	102	6.48	
East ꞌAreꞌare	2,452	Arsene Waia	People's Alliance Party	12	0.76	
East Guadalcanal	3,112	Ezekiel Alebua	Solomon Islands United Party	876	41.54	Re-elected
East Guadalcanal	3,112	Johnson Koli	People's Alliance Party	455	21.57	
East Guadalcanal	3,112	David Valusa	Independent	272	12.90	
East Guadalcanal	3,112	Neven Onorio	Solomon Islands Liberal Party	230	10.91	
East Guadalcanal	3,112	Moses Buta	Solomon Islands Labour Party	119	5.64	
East Guadalcanal	3,112	Julius Taipou	Independent	95	4.50	
East Guadalcanal	3,112	John Pedeleni	Independent	62	2.94	
East Honiara	5,148	Batholomew Ulufa'alu	Solomon Islands Liberal Party	808	28.47	Elected
East Honiara	5,148	John Maetia Kaliuae	Solomon Islands United Party	585	20.61	Unseated
East Honiara	5,148	David Jack Maesua	National Front for Progress	481	16.95	
East Honiara	5,148	Leslie Fugui	People's Alliance Party	448	15.79	
East Honiara	5,148	Rolland Dausabea	Independent	409	14.41	
East Honiara	5,148	Alfred Aihunu	Solomon Islands Labour Party	107	3.77	
East Isabel	3,236	Nathaniel Supa	People's Alliance Party	781	31.45	Re-elected
East Isabel	3,236	Michael Evo	Independent	694	27.95	
East Isabel	3,236	Culwick Maneguasa Vahia	Independent	531	21.39	
East Isabel	3,236	Lonsdale Manase	Independent	184	7.41	
East Isabel	3,236	Jayson Luguhavi	Solomon Islands Labour Party	158	6.36	
East Isabel	3,236	Michael Devis	Independent	75	3.02	
East Isabel	3,236	Joseph Bogese	National Front for Progress	60	2.42	
East Kwaio	3,200	John Fisango	Solomon Islands Liberal Party	347	22.46	Elected
East Kwaio	3,200	Samuel Fangaria	National Front for Progress	188	12.17	
East Kwaio	3,200	George Henry Tafoa	Solomon Islands Labour Party	164	10.61	
East Kwaio	3,200	Dick Kolosu Fuamae	Independent	161	10.42	
East Kwaio	3,200	Joseph Firiabae	National Front for Progress	157	10.16	
East Kwaio	3,200	Samson Ubuni	Independent	152	9.84	
East Kwaio	3,200	Gideon Siofa	Independent	132	8.54	
East Kwaio	3,200	Kadmiel Martin	Independent	107	6.93	
East Kwaio	3,200	Azel Laete Susua	Independent	81	5.24	
East Kwaio	3,200	Ken Gala'a	Independent	56	3.62	
East Makira	4,450	David Sitai	People's Alliance Party	2,214	61.96	Re-elected
East Makira	4,450	Benedict Kinika	Solomon Islands United Party	1,359	38.04	
East Malaita	4,037	Alfred Maetia	Solomon Islands United Party	648	28.09	Re-elected
East Malaita	4,037	John Moffat Fugui	Independent	358	15.52	
East Malaita	4,037	Shemuel Siau	Independent	349	15.13	
East Malaita	4,037	Andrew Buga	Independent	270	11.70	
East Malaita	4,037	William Gua	National Front for Progress	229	9.93	
East Malaita	4,037	Daniel Lulutaloa	Solomon Islands Labour Party	123	5.33	
East Malaita	4,037	Stephen Anilafa Sipolo	People's Alliance Party	118	5.11	
East Malaita	4,037	Michael Peter Ramosae	Solomon Islands Liberal Party	105	4.55	
East Malaita	4,037	Kwasi Daurara	Independent	64	2.77	
East Malaita	4,037	Martin Ma'akalo	Independent	43	1.86	
Gizo/Kolombangara	2,559	Jackson Piasi	Solomon Islands Labour Party	429	28.99	Elected
Gizo/Kolombangara	2,559	Joini Tutua	Independent	262	17.70	Unseated
Gizo/Kolombangara	2,559	Lemech D. Qae	Independent	245	16.55	
Gizo/Kolombangara	2,559	Chris Taboua	Independent	245	16.55	
Gizo/Kolombangara	2,559	Warren Paia	Independent	163	11.01	
Gizo/Kolombangara	2,559	Kenneth Vave	People's Alliance Party	133	8.99	
Gizo/Kolombangara	2,559	Etekia Avita	Independent	3	0.20	
Lau/Mbaelelea	9,014	Ben Foukona	National Front for Progress	710	16.28	Re-elected
Lau/Mbaelelea	9,014	Sale Ferania	Independent	699	16.03	
Lau/Mbaelelea	9,014	Paul Maenu'u	Independent	388	8.90	
Lau/Mbaelelea	9,014	Nathan Wate	Solomon Islands Labour Party	384	8.81	
Lau/Mbaelelea	9,014	Diau Mauga	Independent	383	8.78	
Lau/Mbaelelea	9,014	Philip Solodia	Independent	293	6.72	
Lau/Mbaelelea	9,014	Daniel Aba	Independent	279	6.40	
Lau/Mbaelelea	9,014	Alwyn Wa'ako	Independent	269	6.17	
Lau/Mbaelelea	9,014	Pio Akeasitaloa	Solomon Islands Liberal Party	245	5.62	
Lau/Mbaelelea	9,014	Peter Alafa	Independent	186	4.27	
Lau/Mbaelelea	9,014	F. Waneuria	Independent	164	3.76	
Lau/Mbaelelea	9,014	Allen Billy Arafoa	People's Alliance Party	149	3.42	
Lau/Mbaelelea	9,014	Paul Kakai	Independent	89	2.04	
Lau/Mbaelelea	9,014	Andrew Aluna	Independent	73	1.67	
Lau/Mbaelelea	9,014	Stephen Iro'omea	Independent	40	0.92	
Lau/Mbaelelea	9,014	A. Silofae	Independent	10	0.23	
Malaita Outer Islands	932	Abraham Kapei	Independent	243	36.11	Re-elected
Malaita Outer Islands	932	Shadrach R. Keuni	Solomon Islands Labour Party	161	23.92	
Malaita Outer Islands	932	Brown Saua	People's Alliance Party	156	23.18	
Malaita Outer Islands	932	Paul Keyaumi	Independent	113	16.79	
Marovo	3,248	Christopher C. Abe	People's Alliance Party	1,204	52.39	Re-elected
Marovo	3,248	Snyder Rini	National Front for Progress	669	29.11	
Marovo	3,248	Pulepada Ghemu	Independent	218	9.49	
Marovo	3,248	Haroni H. Hilli	Solomon Islands Labour Party	207	9.01	
Nggela	5,150	Gordon Mara	Independent	863	24.23	Elected
Nggela	5,150	Martin Mata	People's Alliance Party	713	20.02	
Nggela	5,150	Robert Bera	Independent	703	19.74	Unseated
Nggela	5,150	Henry Raraka Koga	Independent	601	16.87	
Nggela	5,150	Mathew Puia	Solomon Islands Liberal Party	532	14.94	
Nggela	5,150	Richard Harper	Solomon Islands Labour Party	111	3.12	
Nggela	5,150	Patrick Ifurii	Independent	39	1.09	
North Choiseul	2,731	Allan Qurusu	Independent	1,089	53.25	Re-elected
North Choiseul	2,731	Clement Pikabatu Kengava	Independent	492	24.06	
North Choiseul	2,731	Jimmy Pitanapi	Independent	212	10.37	
North Choiseul	2,731	Voyce Pitakaka	Independent	137	6.70	
North Choiseul	2,731	Elijah Kimasaru	People's Alliance Party	68	3.33	
North Choiseul	2,731	Wesley Vukakolo	Solomon Islands Labour Party	47	2.30	
North East Guadalcanal	2,738	Waeta Ben	Independent	836	44.54	Elected
North East Guadalcanal	2,738	Hilda Thugea Kari	People's Alliance Party	777	41.40	
North East Guadalcanal	2,738	Daniel Sade	Independent	264	14.06	Unseated
North Guadalcanal	3,827	Baddlly Devesi	Independent	1,161	44.98	Elected
North Guadalcanal	3,827	Gideon Moses	Independent	296	11.47	
North Guadalcanal	3,827	David Vatamana Vouza	Solomon Islands Labour Party	286	11.08	
North Guadalcanal	3,827	David Thuguvoda	Independent	257	9.96	
North Guadalcanal	3,827	George Palua	People's Alliance Party	166	6.43	
North Guadalcanal	3,827	Stephen Paeni	Solomon Islands Liberal Party	129	5.00	Unseated
North Guadalcanal	3,827	Alfred Thugea	Independent	112	4.34	
North Guadalcanal	3,827	Stephen Mataghu	Independent	110	4.26	
North Guadalcanal	3,827	John B. Manebona	Independent	64	2.48	
North West Malaita	4,382	John Edmond Foreman Sukina	Independent	577	22.65	Elected
North West Malaita	4,382	Swanson Cornelius Konofilia	National Front for Progress	547	21.48	Unseated
North West Malaita	4,382	Joseph Taega	Solomon Islands Liberal Party	511	20.06	
North West Malaita	4,382	Fred Neobule	Independent	362	14.21	
North West Malaita	4,382	Saul Sumagelo	Independent	187	7.34	
North West Malaita	4,382	Joseph Gofi	Solomon Islands Labour Party	145	5.69	
North West Malaita	4,382	Andrew Tonawane	Independent	89	3.49	
North West Malaita	4,382	Jonas Bobby	Independent	75	2.94	
North West Malaita	4,382	Wilfred Daoau	Independent	54	2.12	
Ranongga/Simbo	2,249	Reuben Lilo	Independent	378	22.49	Elected
Ranongga/Simbo	2,249	Jay Hong	People's Alliance Party	370	22.01	
Ranongga/Simbo	2,249	Wilson. T. Sosopu	Independent	235	13.98	
Ranongga/Simbo	2,249	Maxwell Simi	Independent	169	10.05	
Ranongga/Simbo	2,249	Stephen B. Joi	Independent	139	8.27	
Ranongga/Simbo	2,249	George Talasasa	Solomon Islands Liberal Party	92	5.47	
Ranongga/Simbo	2,249	Bruce Ragoso	Independent	88	5.23	
Ranongga/Simbo	2,249	Laurence Runikera	Independent	87	5.18	
Ranongga/Simbo	2,249	Remon Sore	Independent	47	2.80	
Ranongga/Simbo	2,249	Gordon Siama	Independent	41	2.44	
Ranongga/Simbo	2,249	George Alepio	Independent	35	2.08	
Rennell/Bellona	1,493	Joses Taungenga Tuhanuku	Solomon Islands Labour Party	468	52.64	Elected
Rennell/Bellona	1,493	Paul John	People's Alliance Party	210	23.62	
Rennell/Bellona	1,493	John Tepaika	National Front for Progress	183	20.58	Unseated
Rennell/Bellona	1,493	Wesley Hakanoa	Solomon Islands United Party	28	3.15	
Roviana and North New Georgia	2,600	Job Dudley Tausinga	People's Alliance Party	1,741	72.00	Re-elected
Roviana and North New Georgia	2,600	Ian Kopele Talasasa	Solomon Islands Labour Party	677	28.00	
Russells/Savo	3,520	Allan Kemakeza	People's Alliance Party	990	45.23	Elected
Russells/Savo	3,520	Aubrey Puia	Solomon Islands Labour Party	490	22.38	
Russells/Savo	3,520	Augustine Rose	Independent	462	21.11	
Russells/Savo	3,520	John Ngina	Independent	204	9.32	
Russells/Savo	3,520	B. Silas Selo	Solomon Islands Liberal Party	43	1.96	
Shortland	1,250	Albert Bakale Laore	Independent	317	32.55	Elected
Shortland	1,250	James Laore	Solomon Islands Labour Party	221	22.69	
Shortland	1,250	Peter J. Salaka	People's Alliance Party	207	21.25	Unseated
Shortland	1,250	Ezekiel Alex Ivinui	Independent	122	12.53	
Shortland	1,250	Ludovic Hasaodiau	Independent	107	10.99	
Small Malaita	4,212	Alex Bartlett	Independent	908	29.16	Re-elected
Small Malaita	4,212	William Nii Haomae	National Front for Progress	679	21.80	
Small Malaita	4,212	Michael Masiha	Solomon Islands Labour Party	551	17.69	
Small Malaita	4,212	Nicholas Ma'aramo	Solomon Islands Liberal Party	529	16.99	
Small Malaita	4,212	Christian Moffat Suiga	People's Alliance Party	447	14.35	
South Choiseul	3,089	Caleb Kotali	Independent	721	31.86	Elected
South Choiseul	3,089	Harrison Benjamin	Independent	445	19.66	
South Choiseul	3,089	Romano Noqebatu	People's Alliance Party	293	12.95	
South Choiseul	3,089	Alfred Sasa Biliki	National Front for Progress	260	11.49	
South Choiseul	3,089	Jason Dorovolomo	Independent	226	9.99	Unseated
South Choiseul	3,089	Alpha Kimata	Independent	192	8.48	
South Choiseul	3,089	Stainer Pitaduna	Independent	126	5.57	
South Guadalcanal	3,217	Victor Samuel Ngele	People's Alliance Party	902	39.18	Elected
South Guadalcanal	3,217	Sethuel Kelly	Independent	646	28.06	Unseated
South Guadalcanal	3,217	Stephen Cheka	National Front for Progress	594	25.80	
South Guadalcanal	3,217	Victor Alikivara	Solomon Islands Liberal Party	101	4.39	
South Guadalcanal	3,217	Craig Apusae Pelu	Independent	59	2.56	
Temotu Nende	3,350	Ataban M Tropa	People's Alliance Party	736	30.65	Re-elected
Temotu Nende	3,350	Peter Noli	Solomon Islands Liberal Party	413	17.20	
Temotu Nende	3,350	John Melanoli	Independent	291	12.12	
Temotu Nende	3,350	John Tope	Solomon Islands Labour Party	278	11.58	
Temotu Nende	3,350	James Mekab	National Front for Progress	230	9.58	
Temotu Nende	3,350	Jonas Melatua	Independent	150	6.25	
Temotu Nende	3,350	Samuel Tensing Leo	Independent	109	4.54	
Temotu Nende	3,350	Ambrose Yamalo	Independent	86	3.58	
Temotu Nende	3,350	Balthazar Laula	Independent	61	2.54	
Temotu Nende	3,350	Caspar Uka	Independent	47	1.96	
Temotu Pele	3,527	Michael Maina	National Front for Progress	484	23.17	Elected
Temotu Pele	3,527	Simon Peter Leinga	People's Alliance Party	234	11.20	Unseated
Temotu Pele	3,527	Wilson Ramsey Nimepo	Independent	206	9.86	
Temotu Pele	3,527	John Patteson Vaike	Solomon Islands Labour Party	195	9.33	
Temotu Pele	3,527	Nathaniel Menigi	Independent	170	8.14	
Temotu Pele	3,527	Charles Natembo	Independent	137	6.56	
Temotu Pele	3,527	Samson Maloaki	Independent	121	5.79	
Temotu Pele	3,527	George Albert Fafale	Independent	104	4.98	
Temotu Pele	3,527	Ezekiel Maai Alolo	Independent	102	4.88	
Temotu Pele	3,527	Moffat Bonunga	Independent	97	4.64	
Temotu Pele	3,527	John Knox Ikaoeo	Independent	61	2.92	
Temotu Pele	3,527	John Mark Ma'ake	Independent	55	2.63	
Temotu Pele	3,527	John Teanake	Independent	41	1.96	
Temotu Pele	3,527	Robert Taylor	Independent	37	1.77	
Temotu Pele	3,527	John Baddley Bakila	Solomon Islands Liberal Party	34	1.63	
Temotu Pele	3,527	Willie Dagi Kailo	Independent	11	0.53	
Ulawa/Ugi	1394	Nathaniel Rahumae Waena	People's Alliance Party	—	—	Re-elected unopposed
Vella Lavella	3,030	Allan Paul	People's Alliance Party	866	35.12	Elected
Vella Lavella	3,030	Seth G. Lekelalu	Independent	646	26.20	Unseated
Vella Lavella	3,030	Iodine Panasasa	Independent	548	22.22	
Vella Lavella	3,030	Reddly Kiko	Independent	313	12.69	
Vella Lavella	3,030	Gwen J. Abana	Independent	93	3.77	
Vona Vona/Rendova/Tetepari	2,599	Danny Philip	Solomon Islands Liberal Party	685	35.58	Re-elected
Vona Vona/Rendova/Tetepari	2,599	Holoti Panapio	People's Alliance Party	509	26.44	
Vona Vona/Rendova/Tetepari	2,599	Timothy Zama Hebala	Independent	191	9.92	
Vona Vona/Rendova/Tetepari	2,599	Hugh Soakai	Independent	161	8.36	
Vona Vona/Rendova/Tetepari	2,599	Nathaniel Soto	Independent	93	4.83	
Vona Vona/Rendova/Tetepari	2,599	John Talasasa	Independent	86	4.47	
Vona Vona/Rendova/Tetepari	2,599	Billy Veo	Independent	80	4.16	
Vona Vona/Rendova/Tetepari	2,599	Martin Wickham	Solomon Islands Labour Party	67	3.48	
Vona Vona/Rendova/Tetepari	2,599	Patterson Runikera	Independent	35	1.82	
Vona Vona/Rendova/Tetepari	2,599	Luxton Jovere	Independent	18	0.94	
West ꞌAreꞌare	2,518	Andrew Nori	National Front for Progress	669	40.97	Re-elected
West ꞌAreꞌare	2,518	David Kausimae	People's Alliance Party	566	34.66	
West ꞌAreꞌare	2,518	Vincent Nakumora	Solomon Islands Liberal Party	199	12.19	
West ꞌAreꞌare	2,518	Albert Hauhare	Solomon Islands Labour Party	199	12.19	
West Guadalcanal	4,343	George Kejoa	Independent	1,204	43.91	Re-elected
West Guadalcanal	4,343	Francis Orodani	People's Alliance Party	602	21.95	
West Guadalcanal	4,343	John Martin Garo	Solomon Islands Liberal Party	468	17.07	
West Guadalcanal	4,343	Gordon Billy Gatu	Independent	262	9.56	
West Guadalcanal	4,343	Kamilo Teke	Independent	206	7.51	
West Honiara	3,777	Ben Gale	People's Alliance Party	478	28.23	Re-elected
West Honiara	3,777	Edward Kingmele	Independent	370	21.85	
West Honiara	3,777	Peter Vincent Bennett	Solomon Islands Labour Party	289	17.07	
West Honiara	3,777	John Wheatley	Solomon Islands Liberal Party	215	12.70	
West Honiara	3,777	Justus Charles Lesimaoma	Independent	210	12.40	
West Honiara	3,777	William Taisia	Solomon Islands United Party	89	5.26	
West Honiara	3,777	Ruth Teu Keyaumi	Independent	42	2.48	
West Isabel	3,289	Edmond H. Anderson	Independent	883	33.74	Elected
West Isabel	3,289	Dennis Carlos Lulei	People's Alliance Party	868	33.17	Unseated
West Isabel	3,289	Robert Perakana	Independent	368	14.06	
West Isabel	3,289	Nelson Kehe Kile	Independent	340	12.99	
West Isabel	3,289	Hudson Kikovaka	Independent	158	6.04	
West Kwaio	3,104	George Luialamo	Solomon Islands Liberal Party	642	33.13	Elected
West Kwaio	3,104	Jonathan Wesley Kuka	National Front for Progress	438	22.60	Unseated
West Kwaio	3,104	Jack Francis Ross	Independent	252	13.00	
West Kwaio	3,104	Abraham Baeanisia	Independent	184	9.49	
West Kwaio	3,104	Christian Bili	Independent	179	9.24	
West Kwaio	3,104	Paul Andrew Foasi	Solomon Islands Labour Party	174	8.98	
West Kwaio	3,104	Joseph Maeaniani	Independent	55	2.84	
West Kwaio	3,104	Adrian Eddy Bibimauri	Independent	14	0.72	
West Kwara'ae	6,381	Sam Alasia	National Front for Progress	681	20.48	Elected
West Kwara'ae	6,381	Stephen Tonafalea	Independent	420	12.63	Unseated
West Kwara'ae	6,381	Malcolm Maefilia	Solomon Islands Liberal Party	335	10.08	
West Kwara'ae	6,381	George Augustus Inomea	Independent	257	7.73	
West Kwara'ae	6,381	Cypriano Rifalea	Independent	223	6.71	
West Kwara'ae	6,381	Collin Gauwane	Independent	208	6.26	
West Kwara'ae	6,381	Alban Kedei Kome	People's Alliance Party	203	6.11	
West Kwara'ae	6,381	Chris Suaga	Independent	188	5.65	
West Kwara'ae	6,381	Robert Wilson Aioro	Solomon Islands Labour Party	177	5.32	
West Kwara'ae	6,381	Jemuel Misalo	Independent	148	4.45	
West Kwara'ae	6,381	Patrick Liufo'oa Gwaimaoa	Independent	142	4.27	
West Kwara'ae	6,381	Daniel Daununu Fale	Independent	126	3.79	
West Kwara'ae	6,381	Francis Lulumani	Independent	117	3.52	
West Kwara'ae	6,381	Max Solo Erenimae	Independent	67	2.02	
West Kwara'ae	6,381	Alfred Kela	Independent	33	0.99	
West Makira	4177	Solomon S. Mamaloni	People's Alliance Party	—	—	Re-elected unopposed
