= People's Alliance Party (Solomon Islands) =

- Founded: 1979
- Preceded by: Rural Alliance Party; People's Progressive Party
- National Parliament: 0 / 50

The People's Alliance Party (PAP) is a political party in Solomon Islands.

== History ==
The PAP was formed in 1979 through a merger of the Rural Alliance Party and the People's Progressive Party. Led by Solomon Mamaloni, it won ten of the 38 seats in the 1980 general elections and Mamaloni became Leader of the Opposition. When the Solomon Islands United Party (SIUP) government fell in 1981, Mamaloni was able to form a coalition government with the National Democratic Party and independent MPs and became prime minister. The party received the most votes in the 1984 elections, winning 12 seats. However, the SIUP won 14 and the PAP returned to opposition.

The PAP won a landslide victory in the 1989 elections, taking 23 of the 38 seats and Mamaloni became prime minister again. The 1993 elections saw the party reduced to nine seats as the Solomon Islands Government of National Unity, Reconciliation and Progress Party (SIGNUR) won 20. However, SIGNUR leader Francis Billy Hilly lost a vote of no-confidence in 1994 and Mamaloni was elected prime minister in his place. The PAP won only seven seats in the 1997 elections, resulting in Mamaloni returning to being Leader of the Opposition, a post he held until his death in 2000.

The party won 20 of the 50 seats in the 2001 elections, becoming the largest party in Parliament. The PAP's Allan Kemakeza became prime minister. In the 2006 elections, the party was reduced to three seats in a Parliament dominated by independents. It won two seats in the 2010 elections, and three in the 2014 elections.

== Election results ==
Election	Votes	%	Seats	+/–
1980	9,085	15.76 (#2)	10 / 38	New
1984	15,923	23.26 (#1)	12 / 38	▲2
1989	15,562	19.23 (#1)	23 / 38	▲11
1993	20,267	16.40 (#2)	9 / 47	▼14
1997			7 / 50	▼2
2001			20 / 50	▲13
2006	11,935	6.26 (#3)	3 / 50	▼17
2010	4,619	1.96 (#5)	0 / 50	▼3
2014	11,414	4.44 (#5)	3 / 50	▲3
2019	18,573	6.00 (#6)	2 / 50	▼1
2024	5,593	1.62 (#9)	0 / 50	▼2
