= 1980 Solomon Islands general election =

- 6 August 1980
- All 38 seats in the National Parliament; 19 seats needed for a majority
Party	Leader	Vote %	Seats
United Party	Peter Kenilorea	17.96	13
People's Alliance	Solomon Mamaloni	15.64	8
National Democratic	Bartholomew Ulufa'alu	8.40	2
Independents	–	58.00	15
This lists parties that won seats. See the complete results below.
Prime Minister before	Prime Minister after
Peter Kenilorea; United Party	Peter Kenilorea; United Party

General elections were held in the Solomon Islands on 6 August 1980. They were the first since independence has been achieved two years earlier. The Solomon Islands United Party led by Prime Minister Peter Kenilorea emerged as the largest party, winning 16 of the 38 seats. Following the elections, Kenilorea was re-elected Prime Minister.

== Campaign ==
A total of 241 candidates contested the 38 seats.

== Results ==
Around two-thirds of incumbent MPs lost their seats. The election result in West Honiara was annulled by the Electoral Commission after the High Court ruled that the winning candidate Ben Gale had committed electoral offences. The by-election was held in August 1981 and was won by Gordon Billy Gatu of the National Democratic Party who received 681 votes to the 290 for Frank Saemala of the SIUP and 245 for Lilly Ogatina Poznanski, who ran as an independent.

Party	Votes	%	Seats
Solomon Islands United Party	10,437	17.96	13
People's Alliance Party	9,085	15.64	8
National Democratic Party	4,878	8.40	2
Independents	33,697	58.00	15
Total	58,097	100.00	38
Registered voters/turnout	99,843	–	
Source: Solomon Islands Election Resources

=== By constituency ===
Constituency	Candidate	Party	Votes	%	Notes
Central Guadalcanal	Paul Joseph Tovua	Solomon Islands United Party	608	44.71	Re-elected
Central Guadalcanal	Francis George Labu	People's Alliance Party	244	17.94	
Central Guadalcanal	Samuel Topilu	Independent	196	14.41	
Central Guadalcanal	Sam Nesa Chamatete	National Democratic Party	167	12.28	
Central Guadalcanal	M. J. Koba	Independent	86	6.32	
Central Guadalcanal	Jim Vokia	Independent	59	4.34	
Central Malaita	Adrian Bataiofesi	National Democratic Party	412	26.95	Elected
Central Malaita	Collin Gauwane	Solomon Islands United Party	271	17.72	Unseated
Central Malaita	John Paul Dio	Independent	234	15.30	
Central Malaita	B. Bosokuru	Independent	222	14.52	
Central Malaita	R. Folota	Independent	113	7.39	
Central Malaita	Vincent Talauburi	Independent	97	6.34	
Central Malaita	Lionel Oloni	Independent	81	5.30	
Central Malaita	Frank Fosala	Independent	41	2.68	
Central Malaita	F. Kona	Independent	23	1.50	
Central Malaita	George Maelalo	Independent	20	1.31	
Central Malaita	Pita Saefafia Kirimaoma	Independent	15	0.98	
East ꞌAreꞌare	Peter Kenilorea	Solomon Islands United Party	816	82.67	Re-elected
East ꞌAreꞌare	F. G. Anohere	People's Alliance Party	171	17.33	
East Guadalcanal	Ezekiel Alebua	Independent	297	22.59	Elected
East Guadalcanal	David Valusa	National Democratic Party	268	20.38	Unseated
East Guadalcanal	Sam Iko	People's Alliance Party	207	15.74	
East Guadalcanal	Calisto Houma	Independent	199	15.13	
East Guadalcanal	T. Labuvilia	Independent	199	15.13	
East Guadalcanal	E. I. Oha	Independent	66	5.02	
East Guadalcanal	W. Teteha	Independent	60	4.56	
East Guadalcanal	Joel Kikolo	Independent	19	1.44	
East Honiara	Batholomew Ulufa'alu	National Democratic Party	493	33.04	Re-elected
East Honiara	John Maetia Kaliuae	Solomon Islands United Party	403	27.01	
East Honiara	S. Saunana	Independent	323	21.65	
East Honiara	Stephen Anilafa Sipolo	People's Alliance Party	110	7.37	
East Honiara	F. Tafea	Independent	93	6.23	
East Honiara	R. Lence	Independent	70	4.69	
East Isabel	Michael Evo	Independent	586	32.16	Elected
East Isabel	Culwick Maneguasa Vahia	People's Alliance Party	294	16.14	
East Isabel	Z. Takonene	Independent	209	11.47	
East Isabel	Francis Reginald Kikolo	Solomon Islands United Party	184	10.10	Unseated
East Isabel	N. Legua	Independent	172	9.44	
East Isabel	M. Manesonia	Independent	158	8.67	
East Isabel	J. Aujare	Independent	120	6.59	
East Isabel	T. Quity	Independent	99	5.43	
East Kwaio	Daniel Foasifobae	Solomon Islands United Party	646	51.68	Elected
East Kwaio	Jonathan Fifii	National Democratic Party	604	48.32	Unseated
East Makira	Benedict Kinika	Independent	1,001	39.46	Re-elected
East Makira	David Sitai	Independent	989	38.98	
East Makira	F. Campbell	People's Alliance Party	440	17.34	
East Makira	A. Wabwo	Independent	107	4.22	
East Malaita	Alfred Maetia	Solomon Islands United Party	578	29.99	Elected
East Malaita	Faneta Sira	National Democratic Party	331	17.18	Unseated
East Malaita	Billy Fa'arobo	Independent	282	14.63	
East Malaita	Andrew Buga	Independent	127	6.59	
East Malaita	J. Waita	Independent	124	6.43	
East Malaita	Blake Afuga	People's Alliance Party	123	6.38	
East Malaita	E. Lade	Independent	110	5.71	
East Malaita	S. Dolaiasi	Independent	104	5.40	
East Malaita	M. Sanga	Independent	88	4.57	
East Malaita	L. Lomo	Independent	48	2.49	
East Malaita	R. Tisah	Independent	12	0.62	
Gizo/Kolombangara	Lawry Eddie Wickham	Independent	401	32.55	Re-elected
Gizo/Kolombangara	Joini Tutua	People's Alliance Party	275	22.32	
Gizo/Kolombangara	K. Russell	Independent	193	15.67	
Gizo/Kolombangara	D. Hivah	Independent	182	14.77	
Gizo/Kolombangara	J. Qaqara	National Democratic Party	181	14.69	
Lau/Mbaelelea	George Suri Kwanae	Independent	323	12.14	Elected
Lau/Mbaelelea	Nathan Wate	National Democratic Party	320	12.03	
Lau/Mbaelelea	M. Akwai	Independent	300	11.27	
Lau/Mbaelelea	Diau Mauga	Independent	289	10.86	
Lau/Mbaelelea	J. Belo	Independent	252	9.47	
Lau/Mbaelelea	Mariano Kelesi	Independent	246	9.24	Unseated
Lau/Mbaelelea	F. Osifelo	Solomon Islands United Party	235	8.83	
Lau/Mbaelelea	J. Rilaua	Independent	194	7.29	
Lau/Mbaelelea	S. Iniomea	Independent	147	5.52	
Lau/Mbaelelea	P. Kirio	Independent	145	5.45	
Lau/Mbaelelea	P. Kosemu	Independent	140	5.26	
Lau/Mbaelelea	L. Silifa	Independent	70	2.63	
Malaita Outer Islands	Paul Keyaumi	People's Alliance Party	178	38.03	Elected
Malaita Outer Islands	Abraham Kapei	Solomon Islands United Party	163	34.83	
Malaita Outer Islands	Johnson Kengalu	Solomon Islands United Party	68	14.53	Unseated
Malaita Outer Islands	P. Piva	Independent	52	11.11	
Malaita Outer Islands	F. Mulvey	Independent	7	1.50	
Marovo	Pulepada Ghemu	Solomon Islands United Party	351	27.49	Re-elected
Marovo	E. W. Anderson	People's Alliance Party	238	18.64	
Marovo	A. Lokopio	Independent	206	16.13	
Marovo	R. Ophiuvendi	Independent	202	15.82	
Marovo	P. Haro	Independent	190	14.88	
Marovo	J. Kinio	National Democratic Party	90	7.05	
Nggela	Richard Harper	People's Alliance Party	547	20.43	Elected
Nggela	Gordon Mara	Independent	515	19.23	
Nggela	James Loti	Independent	511	19.08	
Nggela	D. P. Maeke	Solomon Islands United Party	323	12.06	
Nggela	Robert Pule	Independent	310	11.58	
Nggela	Johnson Soro	Independent	202	7.54	
Nggela	F. Sawanu	Independent	152	5.68	
Nggela	Ben Tumulima	Independent	118	4.41	Unseated
North Choiseul	Allan Qurusu	Solomon Islands United Party	447	35.93	Elected
North Choiseul	P. Amedio	Independent	309	24.84	
North Choiseul	E. K. Tangolo	Independent	189	15.19	
North Choiseul	Jimmy Pitanapi	People's Alliance Party	130	10.45	
North Choiseul	N. N. Derekolo	Independent	90	7.23	
North Choiseul	J. Vorekale	Independent	79	6.35	
North East Guadalcanal	Waeta Ben	Independent	842	68.57	Re-elected
North East Guadalcanal	David Kauli	People's Alliance Party	157	12.79	
North East Guadalcanal	C. D. Kokoluvia	Independent	83	6.76	
North East Guadalcanal	Reuben Bula	Independent	78	6.35	
North East Guadalcanal	G. Mccall	Independent	68	5.54	
North Guadalcanal	Philip Kapini	Independent	764	44.89	Re-elected
North Guadalcanal	Alfred Maeke	National Democratic Party	276	16.22	
North Guadalcanal	F. Laumae	Independent	230	13.51	
North Guadalcanal	Alfred Thugea	Solomon Islands United Party	167	9.81	
North Guadalcanal	Stephen Paeni	Independent	151	8.87	
North Guadalcanal	R. Patua	Independent	114	6.70	
North West Malaita	Bartholomew Leni Olea	People's Alliance Party	431	29.85	Elected
North West Malaita	Joseph Taega	National Democratic Party	268	18.56	Unseated
North West Malaita	S. Danitofea	Independent	201	13.92	
North West Malaita	Swanson Cornelius Konofilia	Solomon Islands United Party	165	11.43	
North West Malaita	Mahion Dofai	Independent	92	6.37	
North West Malaita	A. Maeobia	Independent	87	6.02	
North West Malaita	Dominic Surioa	Independent	78	5.40	
North West Malaita	J. L. Rodobui	Independent	48	3.32	
North West Malaita	Festus Kenileana	Independent	38	2.63	
North West Malaita	Bartholomew Riolo Okesi	Independent	36	2.49	
Ranongga/Simbo	Francis Billy Hilly	Independent	394	33.56	Re-elected
Ranongga/Simbo	B. E. Nagu	Solomon Islands United Party	176	14.99	
Ranongga/Simbo	J. Poihiti	People's Alliance Party	156	13.29	
Ranongga/Simbo	Bruce Ragoso	Independent	150	12.78	
Ranongga/Simbo	G. Labo	Independent	127	10.82	
Ranongga/Simbo	Patterson Runikera	National Democratic Party	93	7.92	
Ranongga/Simbo	J. Kiko	Independent	78	6.64	
Rennell/Bellona	Paul John	People's Alliance Party	281	36.49	Elected
Rennell/Bellona	John Tepaika	Solomon Islands United Party	261	33.90	Unseated
Rennell/Bellona	J. T. Puia	National Democratic Party	228	29.61	
Roviana and North New Georgia	Geoffrey Opokana Beti	Independent	701	46.73	Re-elected
Roviana and North New Georgia	Frank Jamakana	Independent	393	26.20	
Roviana and North New Georgia	W. Uluilakeba	Independent	240	16.00	
Roviana and North New Georgia	Luxton Jovere	People's Alliance Party	90	6.00	
Roviana and North New Georgia	Alphonse Daga	Independent	76	5.07	
Russells/Savo	John Ngina	People's Alliance Party	395	28.56	Elected
Russells/Savo	Peter Manetiva	Independent	335	24.22	Unseated
Russells/Savo	Mark Vaka	Independent	257	18.58	
Russells/Savo	A. Tonezepo	National Democratic Party	171	12.36	
Russells/Savo	A. Adifaka	Solomon Islands United Party	108	7.81	
Russells/Savo	S. Timi	Independent	70	5.06	
Russells/Savo	G. Tatea	Independent	47	3.40	
Shortland	Peter J. Salaka	Independent	348	54.21	Elected
Shortland	Roy Kelosi	Independent	110	17.13	
Shortland	Remesio Eresi	Independent	103	16.04	Unseated
Shortland	R. Kimisi	Independent	50	7.79	
Shortland	Edward Kingmele	People's Alliance Party	31	4.83	
Small Malaita	Tony Harihiru	Solomon Islands United Party	924	38.31	Elected
Small Malaita	Alex Bartlett	Independent	364	15.09	
Small Malaita	Anthony Saru	Independent	286	11.86	
Small Malaita	Richard Watekari	Independent	205	8.50	
Small Malaita	David Lilimae	People's Alliance Party	182	7.55	
Small Malaita	Emilio Li'I Ouou	National Democratic Party	151	6.26	Unseated
Small Malaita	S. B. Ohanikeni	Independent	123	5.10	
Small Malaita	B. Rilanga	Independent	76	3.15	
Small Malaita	D. L. Uqemane	Independent	51	2.11	
Small Malaita	A. Po'oia	Independent	32	1.33	
Small Malaita	H. Maelasi	Independent	18	0.75	
South Choiseul	Jason Dorovolomo	Solomon Islands United Party	621	45.43	Re-elected
South Choiseul	Franklin Pitakaka	Independent	318	23.26	
South Choiseul	J. Gaqurae	Independent	268	19.60	
South Choiseul	M. Pitakaka	Independent	160	11.70	
South Guadalcanal	George Wilson Mangale	Independent	413	26.63	Elected
South Guadalcanal	D. Manea	Independent	390	25.15	
South Guadalcanal	A. Manakako	Independent	267	17.21	
South Guadalcanal	Victor Alikivara	National Democratic Party	243	15.67	
South Guadalcanal	S. Sese	People's Alliance Party	182	11.73	
South Guadalcanal	P. Manegavai	Independent	56	3.61	
Temotu Nende	Ataban M Tropa	People's Alliance Party	499	32.49	Elected
Temotu Nende	Robert Mewebu	Solomon Islands United Party	359	23.37	
Temotu Nende	Samuel Tensing Leo	Independent	292	19.01	
Temotu Nende	John Melanoli	Independent	218	14.19	Unseated
Temotu Nende	J. Mekabu	Independent	168	10.94	
Temotu Pele	Moffat Bonunga	Solomon Islands United Party	567	37.25	Re-elected
Temotu Pele	Matthew Leuba	Independent	268	17.61	
Temotu Pele	John Mark Ma'ake	Independent	252	16.56	
Temotu Pele	B. Bonie	Independent	228	14.98	
Temotu Pele	Santas Paikai	People's Alliance Party	207	13.60	
Ulawa/Ugi	Andrew Mamau	Independent	542	62.16	Elected
Ulawa/Ugi	Daniel Ho'ota	Independent	282	32.34	Unseated
Ulawa/Ugi	B. Tapo'oa	Independent	48	5.50	
Vella Lavella	George Talasasa	Solomon Islands United Party	275	17.03	Elected
Vella Lavella	S. Matluri	Independent	274	16.97	
Vella Lavella	C. Dorauvo	Independent	253	15.67	
Vella Lavella	Andrew Kukuti	Independent	236	14.61	Unseated
Vella Lavella	Seth G. Lekelalu	Independent	222	13.75	
Vella Lavella	S. Rausu	Independent	181	11.21	
Vella Lavella	C. Piraka	Independent	174	10.77	
Vona Vona/Rendova/Tetepari	Hugh Soakai	Solomon Islands United Party	379	27.21	Elected
Vona Vona/Rendova/Tetepari	John Talasasa	Independent	272	19.53	Unseated
Vona Vona/Rendova/Tetepari	J. D. Mare	Independent	247	17.73	
Vona Vona/Rendova/Tetepari	George Pina Lilo	Independent	198	14.21	
Vona Vona/Rendova/Tetepari	Patrick Paia	People's Alliance Party	110	7.90	
Vona Vona/Rendova/Tetepari	Darcy Everett Lilo	Independent	104	7.47	
Vona Vona/Rendova/Tetepari	B. Gadepeta	Independent	45	3.23	
Vona Vona/Rendova/Tetepari	J. I. Sakiri	Independent	38	2.73	
West ꞌAreꞌare	Alfred Aihunu	Independent	450	38.07	Elected
West ꞌAreꞌare	David Kausimae	People's Alliance Party	433	36.63	Unseated
West ꞌAreꞌare	J. Korinihona	Solomon Islands United Party	211	17.85	
West ꞌAreꞌare	John Mare Aihunu	Independent	51	4.31	
West ꞌAreꞌare	M. S. Houia	Independent	37	3.13	
West Guadalcanal	Kamilo Teke	People's Alliance Party	486	26.40	Elected
West Guadalcanal	Bartholomew Buchanan	Independent	478	25.96	
West Guadalcanal	Matthew Belamataga	Independent	406	22.05	Unseated
West Guadalcanal	M. Qolu	Independent	226	12.28	
West Guadalcanal	Savino Kokopu	National Democratic Party	141	7.66	
West Guadalcanal	F. Tavalo	Independent	104	5.65	
West Honiara	Ben Gale	Independent	443	26.26	Elected
West Honiara	Gordon Billy Gatu	National Democratic Party	413	24.48	
West Honiara	Francis Joseph Saemala	Solomon Islands United Party	368	21.81	
West Honiara	Peter Vincent Bennett	People's Alliance Party	286	16.95	
West Honiara	G. Atkin	Independent	122	7.23	
West Honiara	Colin Bentley	Independent	55	3.26	
West Isabel	Dennis Carlos Lulei	Independent	882	42.71	Elected
West Isabel	Willie Betu	Independent	559	27.07	Unseated
West Isabel	M. B. Habu	Independent	294	14.24	
West Isabel	E. G. Vunagi	People's Alliance Party	203	9.83	
West Isabel	Robert Perakana	Independent	99	4.79	
West Isabel	S. Soni	National Democratic Party	28	1.36	
West Kwaio	Jonathan Wesley Kuka	Solomon Islands United Party	305	22.26	Elected
West Kwaio	Sam Philip Korasimora	Independent	213	15.55	
West Kwaio	J. Frank	Independent	206	15.04	
West Kwaio	John Ale	Independent	165	12.04	
West Kwaio	T. Damutalau	Independent	150	10.95	
West Kwaio	J. Gafui	Independent	104	7.59	
West Kwaio	Henry Tom	Independent	104	7.59	Unseated
West Kwaio	J. S. Talo	Independent	83	6.06	
West Kwaio	S. Ira	Independent	40	2.92	
West Kwara'ae	Alan Taki	Solomon Islands United Party	458	21.01	Re-elected
West Kwara'ae	Leonard Maenuna	People's Alliance Party	439	20.14	
West Kwara'ae	S. S. Ga'a	Independent	292	13.39	
West Kwara'ae	A. R. Lidimani	Independent	268	12.29	
West Kwara'ae	W. D. Tua	Independent	256	11.74	
West Kwara'ae	J. M. L. Akolo'ae	Independent	134	6.15	
West Kwara'ae	T. Babalu	Independent	121	5.55	
West Kwara'ae	W. Maelaua	Independent	106	4.86	
West Kwara'ae	Alfred Kela	Independent	62	2.84	
West Kwara'ae	B. Bualea	Independent	44	2.02	
West Makira	Solomon S. Mamaloni	People's Alliance Party	1,560	82.89	Elected
West Makira	J. Morea	Independent	322	17.11	

== Aftermath ==
Following the elections Kenilorea was re-elected Prime Minister, defeating People's Alliance Party leader Solomon Mamaloni by 25 votes to 5. He formed a government with the support of a group of independents led by Francis Billy Hilly, who became Deputy Prime Minister.

Position	Member	Party
Prime Minister	Peter Kenilorea	Solomon Islands United Party
Deputy Prime Minister; Minister of Health	Francis Billy Hilly	Independent
Minister of Agriculture and Lands	Waeta Ben	Independent
Minister of Education	Geoffrey Beti	Independent
Minister of Finance	Benedict Kinika	Solomon Islands United Party
Minister of Home Affairs	Philip Kapini	Independent
Minister of Law and Information	Lawry Wickham	Independent
Minister of Natural Resources	Paul Tovua	Solomon Islands United Party
Minister of Trade, Industry and Labour	Pulepada Ghemu	Solomon Islands United Party
Minister of Transport and Communications	Moffat Bonunga	Solomon Islands United Party
Minister of Works and Public Utilities	Tony Harihiru	Solomon Islands United Party
Minister of Youth and Cultural Affairs	Denis Lulei	Independent
