= 1997 Solomon Islands general election =

- 6 August 1997
- All 50 seats in the National Parliament; 25 seats needed for a majority
Party	Leader	Seats
SINURP	Solomon Mamaloni	21
People's Alliance		7
NAP		5
United Party	Ezekiel Alebua	4
Liberal Party	Bartholomew Ulufa'alu	4
National		1
Independents	—	6
This lists parties that won seats. See the complete results below.
Prime Minister before	Prime Minister after
Solomon Mamaloni; People's Alliance	Bartholomew Ulufa'alu; Liberal Party

General elections were held in the Solomon Islands on 6 August 1997. A total of 350 candidates representing nine parties contested the election, the result of which was a victory for the Solomon Islands National Unity and Reconciliation Party (SINURP), which won 21 of the 50 seats. However, Bartholomew Ulufa'alu, leader of the Liberal Party, was elected Prime Minister by Parliament, defeating SINURP leader Solomon Mamaloni.

== Results ==
Party	Votes	%	Seats
SINURP			21
People's Alliance Party			7
National Action Party Solomon Islands			5
Solomon Islands United Party			4
Solomon Islands Liberal Party			4
National Party			1
Other parties			2
Independents			6
Total			50
Total votes	140,522	–	
Registered voters/turnout	166,280	84.51	
Source: Solomon Islands Election Resources, Nohlen et al.

=== By constituency ===
Results by constituency
Constituency	Candidate	Votes	%	Notes
Aoke/Langalanga	Batholomew Ulufa'alu	1,341	41.60	Elected
Aoke/Langalanga	Francis Joseph Saemala	1,077	33.40	Unseated
Aoke/Langalanga	Francis Walelia	456	14.10	
Aoke/Langalanga	Jonhson Amasaea	148	4.60	
Aoke/Langalanga	Joses David Totorea	79	2.50	
Aoke/Langalanga	John Batalibasi	69	2.10	
Aoke/Langalanga	Joseph Walemola	31	1.00	
Aoke/Langalanga	Andrew Buga	23	0.70	
Baegu/Asifola	Steve Aumanu	602	23.20	Elected
Baegu/Asifola	Jasper Tagani Anisi	469	18.00	
Baegu/Asifola	Nathan Wate	467	18.00	
Baegu/Asifola	Walter Folotalu	452	17.40	Unseated
Baegu/Asifola	Steward Maearo	343	13.20	
Baegu/Asifola	Baddley Anita	249	9.60	
Baegu/Asifola	George Ashly Kakaluale	17	0.70	
Central Guadalcanal	Walton Naezol	1,246	37.20	Elected
Central Guadalcanal	Joash Salani	406	12.10	
Central Guadalcanal	Haniel Miniti	394	11.80	
Central Guadalcanal	Willie Ronnie	359	10.70	
Central Guadalcanal	Clement Jimmy Natei	322	9.60	
Central Guadalcanal	Michael Kelly	262	7.80	
Central Guadalcanal	Jeriel Watson Mani	229	6.80	
Central Guadalcanal	Allan Moses Telei	129	3.90	
Central Honiara	Moon Pin Kwan	625	16.30	Elected
Central Honiara	Walton Willy Abuito'o	443	11.60	Unseated
Central Honiara	Ronnie To'ofilu	428	11.20	
Central Honiara	Sam Iro	372	9.70	
Central Honiara	Alex Rukia	287	7.50	
Central Honiara	Alfred Aofia	279	7.30	
Central Honiara	Billy Gizo Saenamua	229	6.00	
Central Honiara	Martin Alufurai	223	5.80	
Central Honiara	Henry G. Laufunua	207	5.40	
Central Honiara	Harold Maomatekwa	157	4.10	
Central Honiara	Stephen Walter Misiosi	142	3.70	
Central Honiara	Clement Waiwori	126	3.30	
Central Honiara	Tina Wawane	115	3.00	
Central Honiara	Henry Ifui	109	2.90	
Central Honiara	Ben Gale	44	1.20	
Central Honiara	Catherine Adifaka	26	0.70	
Central Honiara	Edwin Sitori Nanau	10	0.30	
Central Honiara	Charles Fox	2	0.10	
Central Kwara'ae	Fred Iro Fono	1,449	39.70	Elected
Central Kwara'ae	Barton Raomae	486	13.30	
Central Kwara'ae	David Ganifiri	387	10.60	
Central Kwara'ae	Richard Na'amo Irosaea	378	10.40	
Central Kwara'ae	Harold D Leka	373	10.20	
Central Kwara'ae	Reuben Torii Moli	312	8.50	
Central Kwara'ae	Rose Anilabata	135	3.70	
Central Kwara'ae	George Gaitolo	130	3.60	
Central Makira	Japhet Waipora	632	31.30	Elected
Central Makira	Jackson Sunaone	600	29.70	
Central Makira	Benedict Kinika	402	19.90	Unseated
Central Makira	Reginald Nunu	384	19.00	
East ꞌAreꞌare	Dickson Warakohia	678	29.80	Elected
East ꞌAreꞌare	Andrew Hanaria Keniasina	601	26.40	
East ꞌAreꞌare	Edward Huniehu	570	25.10	Unseated
East ꞌAreꞌare	Solomon Manata	252	11.10	
East ꞌAreꞌare	James Nihopara	173	7.60	
East Central Guadalcanal	Hilda Thugea Kari	1,626	49.70	Re-elected
East Central Guadalcanal	Mark Gatu	794	24.30	
East Central Guadalcanal	Sam Mali	613	18.70	
East Central Guadalcanal	Nathaniel Mara	241	7.40	
East Choiseul	Mannaseh Sogavare	1,111	65.40	Elected
East Choiseul	Allan Qurusu	588	34.60	Unseated
East Guadalcanal	Johnson Koli	1,105	35.30	Elected
East Guadalcanal	Douglas Ete	746	23.80	
East Guadalcanal	Ezekiel Alebua	529	16.90	Unseated
East Guadalcanal	Claudios Sarai	279	8.90	
East Guadalcanal	Garnett Babaua	214	6.80	
East Guadalcanal	Bobby Marcellin Tangi	175	5.60	
East Guadalcanal	Judith Tafea	80	2.60	
East Honiara	Charles Dausabea	1,014	20.20	Elected
East Honiara	David Jack Maesua	992	19.80	
East Honiara	Andrew Nori	785	15.60	
East Honiara	Christina Garo	657	13.10	
East Honiara	Festus Suruma	391	7.80	
East Honiara	Michael Kwaioloa	371	7.40	
East Honiara	James Tora Ngarasimatawa	316	6.30	
East Honiara	William Gua	278	5.50	
East Honiara	Samuel Ifuna'au	212	4.20	
East Kwaio	Alfred Solomon Sasako	896	31.00	Elected
East Kwaio	John Fisango	602	20.80	Unseated
East Kwaio	John Fiuwalekwala	544	18.80	
East Kwaio	Gideon Siofa	451	15.60	
East Kwaio	James Tommy Fa'awela'a	126	4.40	
East Kwaio	Aziel Laete'e	121	4.20	
East Kwaio	Robert Soekeni	119	4.10	
East Kwaio	Stowell Fika Kolosu	35	1.20	
East Makira	David Sitai	2,483	70.80	Re-elected
East Makira	Mathias Pepena	625	17.80	
East Makira	George Kuata	398	11.40	
East Malaita	Alfred Maetia	360	20.50	Re-elected
East Malaita	John Wesley Alasina	311	17.70	
East Malaita	John Alick Sam Lota	240	13.70	
East Malaita	Billy Fa'arobo	208	11.80	
East Malaita	Thomas Atoa Leabulu	176	10.00	
East Malaita	John Maetia Kaliuae	166	9.40	
East Malaita	Robert Belo Mafane	123	7.00	
East Malaita	Wilfred Bello Faari	81	4.60	
East Malaita	Azriel Alafa	36	2.00	
East Malaita	Rocky Tisa Sugumanu	35	2.00	
East Malaita	Frank Manioli	22	1.30	
Fataleka	Ronidi Mani	683	26.20	Elected
Fataleka	John Musuota	462	17.70	Unseated
Fataleka	Matthew Iroga	207	7.90	
Fataleka	Cornelius Donga	187	7.20	
Fataleka	Sam Sipolo	139	5.30	
Fataleka	Clement Lemani	130	5.00	
Fataleka	Gregson Genesis Angisia	123	4.70	
Fataleka	Casper Cassidy Luiramo	121	4.60	
Fataleka	Frank Dele Iamaea	120	4.60	
Fataleka	Nicholas Niko Rubosa	106	4.10	
Fataleka	Jeffrey Iniota	105	4.00	
Fataleka	Bala Babanimae	85	3.30	
Fataleka	David Dauwane	79	3.00	
Fataleka	Tony Kedeau	62	2.40	
Gao/Bugotu	James Saliga	841	34.60	Elected
Gao/Bugotu	William H. Gigini	760	31.30	
Gao/Bugotu	Nathaniel Supa	601	24.70	
Gao/Bugotu	Joseph Tige	229	9.40	
Gizo/Kolombangara	Jackson Piasi	794	29.10	Re-elected
Gizo/Kolombangara	Eric Havea	672	24.60	
Gizo/Kolombangara	Arthur Kovara Unusu	543	19.90	
Gizo/Kolombangara	Ben Ta'ake	362	13.20	
Gizo/Kolombangara	Paul Oge	171	6.30	
Gizo/Kolombangara	Goerge Gumi	128	4.70	
Gizo/Kolombangara	Douglas Hiva	63	2.30	
Hograno/Kia/Havulei	Edmond H Anderson	1,081	43.00	Re-elected
Hograno/Kia/Havulei	Eddie Ene	906	36.00	
Hograno/Kia/Havulei	Nelson Kehe Kile	527	21.00	
Lau/Mbaelelea	Charles Ferania Sale	1,015	21.40	Re-elected
Lau/Mbaelelea	Paul Maenu'u	914	19.30	
Lau/Mbaelelea	Bentley Samuel Rogosomani	806	17.00	
Lau/Mbaelelea	Everest Ega	694	14.70	
Lau/Mbaelelea	David Oeta	646	13.70	
Lau/Mbaelelea	James Roni	442	9.30	
Lau/Mbaelelea	Siosi Dioko	180	3.80	
Lau/Mbaelelea	Rex Olangi	35	0.70	
Malaita Outer Islands	David Holosivi	154	17.90	Elected
Malaita Outer Islands	Johnson Kengalu	118	13.70	Unseated
Malaita Outer Islands	Abraham Kapei	112	13.00	
Malaita Outer Islands	Manasseh Apekeia Avicks	105	12.20	
Malaita Outer Islands	Henry Manuhea	91	10.60	
Malaita Outer Islands	Paul Keyaumi	88	10.20	
Malaita Outer Islands	Harry Luahiti	65	7.50	
Malaita Outer Islands	Dorothy Prince	45	5.20	
Malaita Outer Islands	Benjamin Ishmael Keihou	30	3.50	
Malaita Outer Islands	Lawrence Makili	29	3.40	
Malaita Outer Islands	John Rockson Ramofolu	24	2.80	
Maringe/Kokota	Hugo Ragoso	902	32.50	Elected
Maringe/Kokota	Jacob Pitu	668	24.10	
Maringe/Kokota	Dennis Carlos Lulei	594	21.40	Unseated
Maringe/Kokota	Merilyn Gedi	317	11.40	
Maringe/Kokota	Clement Rojumana	291	10.50	
Marovo	Snyder Rini	1,044	31.10	Elected
Marovo	Milikada Miller Silas	717	21.40	
Marovo	Duddley Hirata	523	15.60	
Marovo	Nixon Dennie	493	14.70	
Marovo	Jonah Hite	251	7.50	
Marovo	Pulepada Ghemu	170	5.10	
Marovo	Bently Kimitora	159	4.70	
Nggela	Gordon Mara	1,863	35.80	Re-elected
Nggela	Patterson Mae	791	15.20	
Nggela	William Semu	731	14.10	
Nggela	Alfred Selwyn Manale	596	11.50	
Nggela	Johnson Soro	489	9.40	
Nggela	Fox Meke	383	7.40	
Nggela	Cecil Ono	344	6.60	
North East Guadalcanal	Baddlly Devesi	1,171	34.40	Re-elected
North East Guadalcanal	Jamie Lency Vokia	1,166	34.20	
North East Guadalcanal	Stephen Paeni	530	15.60	
North East Guadalcanal	Philip Kapini	330	9.70	
North East Guadalcanal	Gideon Moses	211	6.20	
North Guadalcanal	David Vatamana Vouza	479	15.60	Re-elected
North Guadalcanal	Brian Soabo	459	15.00	
North Guadalcanal	Daniel Sade	278	9.10	
North Guadalcanal	David Thuguvoda	277	9.00	
North Guadalcanal	Benedict Garemane	206	6.70	
North Guadalcanal	Augustine Fiukwai	205	6.70	
North Guadalcanal	Michael Mose	197	6.40	
North Guadalcanal	Peter Ok Waleurifo	190	6.20	
North Guadalcanal	Rodger Dunstan Tauariki	156	5.10	
North Guadalcanal	John Maeseau	151	4.90	
North Guadalcanal	Stephen Mataghu	132	4.30	
North Guadalcanal	Enly. J. Becha	132	4.30	
North Guadalcanal	Francis Garimae	113	3.70	
North Guadalcanal	Teddies Time Talairamo	92	3.00	
North Malaita	Daniel E. Kwanairara	1,868	57.50	Elected
North Malaita	Michael Maeliau	1,067	32.90	Unseated
North Malaita	Wilfred Atomea	220	6.80	
North Malaita	James Mae'eda	93	2.90	
North New Georgia	Job Dudley Tausinga	984	77.20	Re-elected
North New Georgia	Henson Cornelius	291	22.80	
North Vella Lavella	Allan Paul	859	51.60	Re-elected
North Vella Lavella	Milner Tozaka	659	39.60	
North Vella Lavella	Marlon Kuve	141	8.50	
North Vella Lavella	Juliet Ketty	5	0.30	
North West Choiseul	Alpha Kimata	1,221	40.80	Re-elected
North West Choiseul	Clement Pikabatu Kengava	906	30.30	
North West Choiseul	Romano Nogebatu	382	12.80	
North West Choiseul	Billy Takubala	304	10.20	
North West Choiseul	William Pita Kutinikolo	149	5.00	
North West Choiseul	Zeberd Karua Kuma	27	0.90	
North West Guadalcanal	Meshach Maebiru Maetoloa	973	24.10	Elected
North West Guadalcanal	Francis Orodani	720	17.80	Unseated
North West Guadalcanal	Roselyn Dettke	698	17.30	
North West Guadalcanal	Sethuel Kelly	518	12.80	
North West Guadalcanal	Bernard Garo	501	12.40	
North West Guadalcanal	Edward Jacob Ronia	302	7.50	
North West Guadalcanal	Gordon Billy Gatu	184	4.60	
North West Guadalcanal	Michael Tohina	140	3.50	
Ranongga/Simbo	Francis Billy Hilly	1,386	55.40	Re-elected
Ranongga/Simbo	Reuben Lilo	784	31.30	
Ranongga/Simbo	Charles Kelly	244	9.80	
Ranongga/Simbo	Maxwell Simi	87	3.50	
Rennell/Bellona	Saueha Joses Tahua	718	51.20	Elected
Rennell/Bellona	Joses Taungenga Tuhanuku	684	48.80	Unseated
Russells/Savo	Allan Kemakeza	2,582	77.60	Re-elected
Russells/Savo	Nelson Rato	747	22.40	
Shortland	Albert Bakale Laore	426	33.20	Re-elected
Shortland	Dominic Tata	320	25.00	
Shortland	George Lepping	320	25.00	
Shortland	Augustine Taneko	122	9.50	
Shortland	Christopher Laore	94	7.30	
Small Malaita	William Nii Haomae	730	17.90	Re-elected
Small Malaita	Alex Bartlett	591	14.50	
Small Malaita	Ellison Koke	568	13.90	
Small Malaita	Martin Rasu	440	10.80	
Small Malaita	Matthew Fakaia	413	10.10	
Small Malaita	Noel Poloso	343	8.40	
Small Malaita	John Bibi	312	7.70	
Small Malaita	Stanley Walakutu	283	6.90	
Small Malaita	Richard Watekari	247	6.10	
Small Malaita	John Waihou	146	3.60	
South Choiseul	Leslie Boseto	980	43.30	Elected
South Choiseul	Wilson Pita	434	19.20	
South Choiseul	Caleb Kotali	368	16.30	Unseated
South Choiseul	C. K. Qalokepeto	291	12.90	
South Choiseul	Harry Leketo	100	4.40	
South Choiseul	W. I. Pitanoe	91	4.00	
South Guadalcanal	Victor Samuel Ngele	1,054	45.40	Re-elected
South Guadalcanal	Steven George	682	29.40	
South Guadalcanal	Victor Totu	475	20.50	
South Guadalcanal	Grey Apusae	65	2.80	
South Guadalcanal	Victor Alikivara	34	1.50	
South Guadalcanal	Stanley Kere	10	0.40	
South New Georgia/Rendova/Tetepari	Danny Philip	1,368	47.10	Re-elected
South New Georgia/Rendova/Tetepari	Rodrick Terry Kera	822	28.30	
South New Georgia/Rendova/Tetepari	Timothy Zama Hebala	499	17.20	
South New Georgia/Rendova/Tetepari	David Lani Gina	216	7.40	
South Vella Lavella	Robins Mesepitu	675	32.90	Elected
South Vella Lavella	Trevor Nonovae	606	29.50	
South Vella Lavella	Oliver Sapo	368	17.90	Unseated
South Vella Lavella	Elton Rore	219	10.70	
South Vella Lavella	George Alu	158	7.70	
South Vella Lavella	Thornley Hite	28	1.40	
Temotu Nende	John Patterson Oti	2,221	59.30	Elected
Temotu Nende	Charles Brown Beu	1,527	40.70	Unseated
Temotu Pele	Michael Maina	1,492	67.60	Re-elected
Temotu Pele	Martin Teddy Magga	580	26.30	
Temotu Pele	John Patterson Tealikilava	135	6.10	
Temotu Vatud	Hudson Teava Rangisearofa	337	21.70	Elected
Temotu Vatud	Jeffrey Teava	323	20.80	
Temotu Vatud	Phillip S. Tuapa	221	14.20	
Temotu Vatud	Charles Natembe	157	10.10	
Temotu Vatud	Collin Maru	147	9.50	
Temotu Vatud	Frederick Soaki	142	9.10	
Temotu Vatud	George Henry West	131	8.40	
Temotu Vatud	Christina Munamua	97	6.20	
Ulawa/Ugi	Nathaniel Rahumae Waena	796	50.80	Re-elected
Ulawa/Ugi	David Horesi	201	12.80	
Ulawa/Ugi	Augustine Waetara	200	12.80	
Ulawa/Ugi	Noel Mamau	196	12.50	
Ulawa/Ugi	Rolland Waenaouou Titiulu	175	11.20	
West ꞌAreꞌare	Alfred Hairiu	515	22.90	Elected
West ꞌAreꞌare	Joe Timothy Ariaria	319	14.20	
West ꞌAreꞌare	John Asipara	285	12.70	
West ꞌAreꞌare	Lawrence Hunumeme	245	10.90	
West ꞌAreꞌare	Moses Ramo	223	9.90	
West ꞌAreꞌare	Jeffery Aihunu Hokuru	161	7.10	
West ꞌAreꞌare	Peter Manehanisiwa Hokuru	156	6.90	
West ꞌAreꞌare	Jim Waroka	138	6.10	
West ꞌAreꞌare	Charles Karaori	107	4.80	
West ꞌAreꞌare	Nelson Kohia	103	4.60	
West Guadalcanal	Thomas Koh Chan	1,051	35.30	Elected
West Guadalcanal	George Kejoa	857	28.80	Unseated
West Guadalcanal	Kamilo Teke	392	13.20	
West Guadalcanal	Senene Tugale	326	11.00	
West Guadalcanal	Samson Teteha	170	5.70	
West Guadalcanal	Augustine Manakako	168	5.60	
West Guadalcanal	Rejected Votes	12	0.40	
West Honiara	Lester Huckle Saomasi	683	30.20	Elected
West Honiara	Peter Vincent Bennett	626	27.70	
West Honiara	Leonard Maenu'u	270	11.90	
West Honiara	Andrew Mua	135	6.00	
West Honiara	James Henry Star Dora	118	5.20	
West Honiara	Margaret Rose Luilamo	100	4.40	
West Honiara	Joseph Douglas	94	4.20	
West Honiara	Albert Hatigeva	79	3.50	
West Honiara	George Albert Kuper	57	2.50	
West Honiara	Cumming K. M. Tepuke	51	2.30	
West Honiara	Christopher C. Abe	48	2.10	
West Honiara	Bartholomew Buchanan	1	0.00	
West Kwaio	George Luialamo	505	17.30	Re-elected
West Kwaio	Mathias Olofia	483	16.50	
West Kwaio	David Nguiburi	433	14.80	
West Kwaio	Miriam Garo	410	14.00	
West Kwaio	Ben Foukona	393	13.40	
West Kwaio	Christian Bili	263	9.00	
West Kwaio	William Gege	195	6.70	
West Kwaio	Bobby Maeanasi	148	5.10	
West Kwaio	Jack Goulolo	88	3.00	
West Kwaio	Frank Ross	8	0.30	
West Kwara'ae	Stephen Tonafalea	633	15.80	Elected
West Kwara'ae	Sam Shemuel Iduri	631	15.80	
West Kwara'ae	Ben Mino	482	12.10	
West Kwara'ae	Sam Alasia	454	11.40	Unseated
West Kwara'ae	Jack Maefaididia	357	8.90	
West Kwara'ae	George Aote'e Faanasoro	344	8.60	
West Kwara'ae	Joses Naumai	324	8.10	
West Kwara'ae	David Maenu	234	5.90	
West Kwara'ae	John Alfred Tuasulia	224	5.60	
West Kwara'ae	Paul Kukute Daokalia	215	5.40	
West Kwara'ae	Chris Suaga	57	1.40	
West Kwara'ae	Uriel Gwali	39	1.00	
West Makira	Solomon S. Mamaloni	1,962	74.30	Re-elected
West Makira	John Palmer Haga	366	13.90	
West Makira	Kennedy Hoda	311	11.80	
West New Georgia/Vona Vona	Nelson Boso	1,112	30.60	Re-elected
West New Georgia/Vona Vona	Aquila Talasasa	848	23.30	
West New Georgia/Vona Vona	Hugh Soakai	773	21.30	
West New Georgia/Vona Vona	Merlie Aqorau	388	10.70	
West New Georgia/Vona Vona	Ronald Kuba Ziru	313	8.60	
West New Georgia/Vona Vona	George Tuke	202	5.60	
