= Solomon Islands United Party =

- Abbreviation: UP
- Founder: Peter Kenilorea
- Founded: March 1980
- Colours: Blue, White, Black
- National Parliament of Solomon Islands: 6 / 50

The Solomon Islands United Party (UP) is a political party in Solomon Islands.

== History ==
The party was established in March 1980 by Prime Minister Peter Kenilorea, and was based on the government he had led since 1978. Kenilorea had initially been an independent, but sought to form a party in the build-up to the 1980 general elections. The party won 16 of the 38 seats and Kenilorea remained Prime Minister after forming a coalition government with the Independent Group. However, the government fell in 1981 after the Independent Group pulled out, at which point the People's Alliance Party's Solomon Mamaloni was able to form a coalition government with the National Democratic Party and independent MPs.

The party retained significant public support throughout the 1980s, and despite receiving fewer votes than the PAP in the 1984 elections, it won the most seats and Kenilorea returned as Prime Minister. He was succeeded by fellow SIUP member Ezekiel Alebua in 1986. However, the party won only four seats in the 1989 elections. The 1993 elections saw it reduced to three seats, and although it gained a seat in the 1997 elections, it lost parliamentary representation in the 2001 elections.

The party was revived in the build-up to the 2010 general elections when the new president, Joel Moffat Konofilia, launched its manifesto in July 2010. He claimed that God had cursed the Solomon Islands to punish the country for "vot[ing] against the nation of Israel" at the United Nations. Asking forgiveness from God, he added that "starting today and onward the United Party will vow its support and vote for Israel unconditionally in obedience to Genesis 12: 1–3". He stated that his beliefs and actions as leader, if elected, would be "rooted deeply in the word of God". However, it ultimately did not contest the elections.

The party contested the 2019 general election, and won two parliamentary seats.

In the lead up to the 2024 general election, the party launched its campaign on 7 March 2024. A core aspect of the UP's manifesto was unity in diversity; the party advocated for developing a "real national identity" whilst preserving the ethnically diverse nation's numerous cultural identities. Party leader Peter Kenilorea Jr., son of the nation's first prime minister, Peter Kenilorea, announced the UP would re-establish ties with Taiwan while maintaining relations with China and reviewing China's security deal. The party also sought to preserve relations with traditional development partners, although Kenilorea warned that Solomon Islands should not hold them as the country's sole saviours. The UP called for a diversification of the economy and warned that the country's reliance on limited income streams, especially logging exports, left Solomon Islands vulnerable to external economic crises. Addressing issues regarding critical infrastructure structure was another priority for the party, particularly the poor state of the roads and bridges. The party would go on to win 6 seats in the election.

== Election results ==
Election	Votes	%	Seats	+/–
1980	10,437	18.10 (#1)	16 / 38	New
1984	14,661	21.42 (#2)	13 / 38	▼3
1989	14,703	18.17 (#2)	4 / 38	▼9
1993	12,973	10.50 (#4)	3 / 47	▼1
1997	N/A	N/A	4 / 50	▲1
2001	Did not contest		0 / 50	▼4
2006	324	0.17 (#11)	0 / 50	0
2010	Did not contest		0 / 50	0
2014	Did not contest		0 / 50	0
2019	32,302	10.43 (#5)	2 / 50	▲2
2024	46,662	13.49 (#3)	6 / 50	▲4
