= Paul Tovua =

Solomon Islands politician (1947–2021)

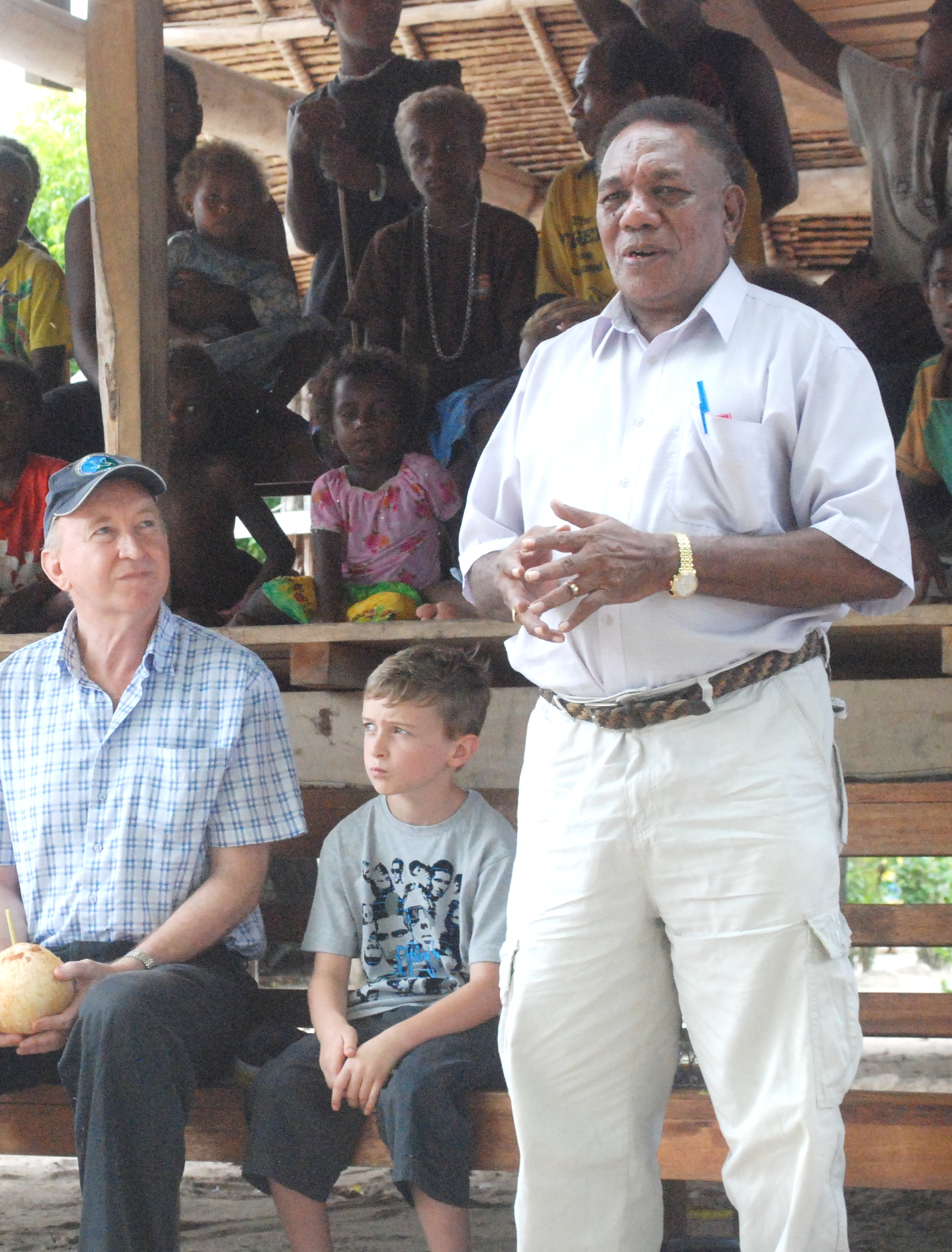
Sir Paul Tovua speaking at a RAMSI Community Outreach at Salasape Village, Central Province, Solomon Islands.

Sir Paul Joshua Tovua KCMG (1947 – 5 February 2021) was a Solomon Islander politician, who served in Parliament representing the Central Guadalcanal constituency since 1976. He was a founding member of the first National Parliament of Solomon Islands, which sat from 1976 to 1980. He served as the Speaker of the National Parliament of Solomon Islands from 1994 to 2001. He and Peter Kenilorea co-chaired the peace talks between the Malaita Eagle Force and the Isatabu Freedom Movement, which ended the Solomon Islands Civil War.

Tovua also worked on an initiative, in conjunction with the Sycamore Tree Project and Solomon Islands Correctional Services, to promote peaceful reconciliation between rival Solomon Islander prison inmates and their families to prevent feuds.

He was appointed Knight Commander of the Order of St Michael and St George in the 2014 New Year Honours list, "for services to politics and to the community".
