= 1984 Solomon Islands general election =

- 24 October 1984
- All 38 seats in the National Parliament; 19 seats needed for a majority
Party	Leader	Vote %	Seats	+/–
United Party	Peter Kenilorea	21.23	13	0
People's Alliance	Solomon Mamaloni	20.90	10	+2
SASF		7.70	4	New
National Democratic		7.23	1	−1
Independents	–	39.35	9	−6
This lists parties that won seats. See the complete results below.
Prime Minister before	Prime Minister after
Solomon Mamaloni; People's Alliance	Peter Kenilorea; United Party

General elections were held in the Solomon Islands on 24 October 1984. A total of 230 candidates contested the elections, the result of which was a victory for the Solomon Islands United Party, which won 13 of the 38 seats.

== Results ==
Eighteen incumbent MPs lost their seats, including eight ministers.

Party	Votes	%	Seats	+/–
Solomon Islands United Party	14,317	21.23	13	0
People's Alliance Party	14,091	20.90	10	+2
Solomon Agu Segu-Fenua	5,190	7.70	4	New
National Democratic Party	4,874	7.23	1	−1
Solomon Islands Cultural Traditional Leaders Movement	2,420	3.59	0	New
Independents	26,531	39.35	9	−6
Vacant			1	–
Total	67,423	100.00	38	0
Registered voters/turnout	110,339	–		
Source: Solomon Islands Election Resources

=== By constituency ===
Constituency	Candidate	Party	Votes	%	Notes
Central Guadalcanal	Paul Joseph Tovua	Solomon Islands United Party	473	29.20	Re-elected
Central Guadalcanal	Samuel Topilu	Solomon Islands Cultural Traditional Leaders Movement	401	24.75	
Central Guadalcanal	Sam Nesa Chamatete	People's Alliance Party	349	21.54	
Central Guadalcanal	Cain Eric Seri	Independent	263	16.23	
Central Guadalcanal	Walter Vaghi	Solomon Agu Segu-Fenua	134	8.27	
Central Malaita	Adrian Bataiofesi	National Democratic Party	615	35.20	Re-elected
Central Malaita	Collin Gauwane	Solomon Islands United Party	320	18.32	
Central Malaita	Japhlet Fono	Independent	157	8.99	
Central Malaita	Walter Andy Ofonani	Solomon Islands Cultural Traditional Leaders Movement	135	7.73	
Central Malaita	Clifton Kalu	Independent	95	5.44	
Central Malaita	Tina Wawane	Independent	90	5.15	
Central Malaita	Harold Maomatekwa	Independent	89	5.09	
Central Malaita	Philip Jack Aru	Independent	86	4.92	
Central Malaita	Ariel Bill Arafamae	Independent	60	3.43	
Central Malaita	Harry Toliabu	Independent	30	1.72	
Central Malaita	Justus Charles Lesimaoma	Independent	29	1.66	
Central Malaita	David Maefasia	Solomon Agu Segu-Fenua	24	1.37	
Central Malaita	Andrew Saeni	People's Alliance Party	17	0.97	
East ꞌAreꞌare	Peter Kenilorea	Solomon Islands United Party	1,016	82.20	Re-elected
East ꞌAreꞌare	Alphonsus Nori	People's Alliance Party	220	17.80	
East Guadalcanal	Ezekiel Alebua	Solomon Islands United Party	958	48.83	Re-elected
East Guadalcanal	David Valusa	People's Alliance Party	397	20.23	
East Guadalcanal	Johnson Koli	Independent	368	18.76	
East Guadalcanal	Norman Onorio	Independent	239	12.18	
East Honiara	John Maetia Kaliuae	Solomon Islands United Party	549	29.79	Elected
East Honiara	Aquila Talasasa	Independent	435	23.60	
East Honiara	Batholomew Ulufa'alu	National Democratic Party	390	21.16	Unseated
East Honiara	David Jack Maesua	Solomon Agu Segu-Fenua	251	13.62	
East Honiara	Rolland Dausabea	Independent	140	7.60	
East Honiara	Aziel Laete Bola'a	Solomon Islands Cultural Traditional Leaders Movement	41	2.22	
East Honiara	John Ratu Daofainia	People's Alliance Party	37	2.01	
East Isabel	Nathaniel Supa	People's Alliance Party	1,008	49.03	Elected
East Isabel	Michael Evo	Independent	813	39.54	Unseated
East Isabel	Rex Bogese	National Democratic Party	235	11.43	
East Kwaio	Election not held				
East Makira	David Sitai	People's Alliance Party	1,868	57.51	Elected
East Makira	Benedict Kinika	Solomon Islands United Party	1,380	42.49	Unseated
East Malaita	Alfred Maetia	Solomon Islands United Party	821	41.44	Re-elected
East Malaita	Billy Fa'arobo	Independent	302	15.24	
East Malaita	John M. Ramoni	Solomon Islands Cultural Traditional Leaders Movement	222	11.21	
East Malaita	Nemuel Misitana	Independent	127	6.41	
East Malaita	Ariel Fa'amae	Independent	117	5.91	
East Malaita	Michael Foutaenu	Independent	104	5.25	
East Malaita	Alick Samo	Independent	104	5.25	
East Malaita	Blake Afuga	Independent	94	4.75	
East Malaita	Jezrel Luitamo Kii	Independent	39	1.97	
East Malaita	Billy Abana	Solomon Agu Segu-Fenua	34	1.72	
East Malaita	Thomas Siau	Independent	17	0.86	
Gizo/Kolombangara	George Ngumi	Independent	313	30.33	Elected
Gizo/Kolombangara	Joini Tutua	People's Alliance Party	299	28.97	
Gizo/Kolombangara	V. Lilo	Independent	150	14.53	
Gizo/Kolombangara	Chris Taboua	Independent	103	9.98	
Gizo/Kolombangara	Jackson Piasi	Solomon Agu Segu-Fenua	75	7.27	
Gizo/Kolombangara	Francis Billy Hilly	Independent	62	6.01	
Gizo/Kolombangara	Hugh Paia	People's Alliance Party	30	2.91	
Lau/Mbaelelea	Ben Foukona	Solomon Agu Segu-Fenua	371	10.68	Elected
Lau/Mbaelelea	Paul Maenu'u	Independent	364	10.48	
Lau/Mbaelelea	Diau Mauga	Solomon Islands United Party	351	10.10	
Lau/Mbaelelea	George Suri Kwanae	Independent	335	9.64	Unseated
Lau/Mbaelelea	Claudio Ganikui	Independent	292	8.41	
Lau/Mbaelelea	Moses Teteau	Solomon Islands Cultural Traditional Leaders Movement	240	6.91	
Lau/Mbaelelea	Lemuel W. Liobana	Independent	196	5.64	
Lau/Mbaelelea	Ferania Sale	Independent	184	5.30	
Lau/Mbaelelea	Bobby Kwaomae	People's Alliance Party	168	4.84	
Lau/Mbaelelea	Solomon Beliga Laumae	Independent	160	4.61	
Lau/Mbaelelea	Selwyn Surimalefo	Independent	155	4.46	
Lau/Mbaelelea	Texley Fa'asi	Independent	140	4.03	
Lau/Mbaelelea	Jim Brown Leni	Independent	135	3.89	
Lau/Mbaelelea	Everest Ega	National Democratic Party	129	3.71	
Lau/Mbaelelea	Saeti Saefafia	Independent	81	2.33	
Lau/Mbaelelea	Alfred Bouro	Independent	79	2.27	
Lau/Mbaelelea	Wilfred Ben Kiriau	Independent	69	1.99	
Lau/Mbaelelea	Jimmy Ngatamae	Independent	25	0.72	
Malaita Outer Islands	Abraham Kapei	Solomon Islands United Party	216	33.80	Elected
Malaita Outer Islands	Paul Keyaumi	People's Alliance Party	191	29.89	Unseated
Malaita Outer Islands	Johnson Kengalu	National Democratic Party	163	25.51	
Malaita Outer Islands	Mark Etua	Solomon Agu Segu-Fenua	38	5.95	
Malaita Outer Islands	Reuben Tenai	Independent	31	4.85	
Marovo	Christopher C. Abe	People's Alliance Party	719	38.84	Elected
Marovo	Snyder Rini	Independent	559	30.20	
Marovo	Rodrick Terry Kera	National Democratic Party	295	15.94	
Marovo	Pulepada Ghemu	Solomon Islands United Party	278	15.02	Unseated
Nggela	Robert Bera	Independent	1,022	33.10	Elected
Nggela	Gordon Mara	Solomon Islands United Party	903	29.24	
Nggela	Henry Raraka Koga	Independent	536	17.36	
Nggela	Richard Tinoni	People's Alliance Party	315	10.20	
Nggela	Johnson Soro	Independent	172	5.57	
Nggela	Richard Harper	Independent	78	2.53	Unseated
Nggela	Ben Tumulima	Independent	62	2.01	
North Choiseul	Allan Qurusu	Solomon Islands United Party	904	62.78	Re-elected
North Choiseul	Isaac Koramakolo	Solomon Agu Segu-Fenua	283	19.65	
North Choiseul	Jimmy Pitanapi	Independent	253	17.57	
North East Guadalcanal	Daniel Sade	Independent	441	32.40	Elected
North East Guadalcanal	Waeta Ben	Solomon Islands United Party	377	27.70	Unseated
North East Guadalcanal	Nelson Thoa	Independent	239	17.56	
North East Guadalcanal	Billy Tapalia	National Democratic Party	124	9.11	
North East Guadalcanal	Reuben Bula	Independent	83	6.10	
North East Guadalcanal	Moses Ghaua	Solomon Agu Segu-Fenua	70	5.14	
North East Guadalcanal	Simon None	Independent	27	1.98	
North Guadalcanal	Stephen Paeni	People's Alliance Party	676	31.49	Elected
North Guadalcanal	Alfred Thugea	Solomon Islands United Party	531	24.73	
North Guadalcanal	David Thuguvoda	Independent	361	16.81	
North Guadalcanal	Samuel Ono	Solomon Agu Segu-Fenua	254	11.83	
North Guadalcanal	Alfred Maeke	Independent	228	10.62	
North Guadalcanal	Peter Sesela	Independent	97	4.52	
North West Malaita	Swanson Cornelius Konofilia	Solomon Islands United Party	360	21.98	Elected
North West Malaita	Bartholomew Leni Olea	Independent	234	14.29	Unseated
North West Malaita	Norman Kwalemanu	Independent	226	13.80	
North West Malaita	Samuel Misitana	Independent	151	9.22	
North West Malaita	Saul Siomagela	Solomon Agu Segu-Fenua	142	8.67	
North West Malaita	Joseph Taega	National Democratic Party	141	8.61	
North West Malaita	John Rarangia	Independent	106	6.47	
North West Malaita	James Delamani	Independent	100	6.11	
North West Malaita	Andrew Willis	Independent	72	4.40	
North West Malaita	Leonard Suluala	Independent	49	2.99	
North West Malaita	Felix Laumae	Independent	33	2.01	
North West Malaita	Francis Daukwai	Independent	24	1.47	
Ranongga/Simbo	Charlie Panakera	Independent	664	47.53	Elected
Ranongga/Simbo	Peter Beck	Independent	345	24.70	
Ranongga/Simbo	Boaz Nagu Eddie	Independent	153	10.95	
Ranongga/Simbo	Bruce Ragoso	Independent	147	10.52	
Ranongga/Simbo	Patterson Runikera	Independent	88	6.30	
Rennell/Bellona	John Tepaika	Solomon Agu Segu-Fenua	357	42.05	Elected
Rennell/Bellona	Paul John	People's Alliance Party	206	24.26	Unseated
Rennell/Bellona	James Tepuke	Independent	167	19.67	
Rennell/Bellona	Puia Kaunga	National Democratic Party	77	9.07	
Rennell/Bellona	Abiah Tegheta	Solomon Islands United Party	42	4.95	
Roviana and North New Georgia	Job Dudley Tausinga	People's Alliance Party	1,488	59.17	Elected
Roviana and North New Georgia	William Talasasa	National Democratic Party	901	35.83	
Roviana and North New Georgia	Rennell Mamupania	Independent	126	5.01	
Russells/Savo	John Ngina	People's Alliance Party	524	28.71	Re-elected
Russells/Savo	Mark Roboliu Kemakeza	Independent	285	15.62	
Russells/Savo	Nestor Bele	Independent	233	12.77	
Russells/Savo	Aubrey Puia	Solomon Agu Segu-Fenua	233	12.77	
Russells/Savo	Mark Golu	Independent	207	11.34	
Russells/Savo	B. Silas Selo	Independent	157	8.60	
Russells/Savo	Jacob Manegaru	Independent	89	4.88	
Russells/Savo	John Baptist Tura	Independent	56	3.07	
Russells/Savo	Wilson Sungi	Independent	41	2.25	
Shortland	Peter J. Salaka	Independent	191	25.99	Re-elected
Shortland	Lawrence Alisae	Independent	147	20.00	
Shortland	Remesio Eresi	National Democratic Party	141	19.18	
Shortland	Roy Kelosi	Independent	115	15.65	
Shortland	Jerry Buare	Solomon Agu Segu-Fenua	83	11.29	
Shortland	Christopher Laore	People's Alliance Party	58	7.89	
Small Malaita	Tony Harihiru	Solomon Islands United Party	512	19.29	Re-elected
Small Malaita	Alex Bartlett	Independent	484	18.24	
Small Malaita	Anthony Saru	Solomon Islands Cultural Traditional Leaders Movement	270	10.17	
Small Malaita	David Lilimae	Independent	270	10.17	
Small Malaita	Richard Watekari	People's Alliance Party	268	10.10	
Small Malaita	David Tapiai	Solomon Agu Segu-Fenua	196	7.39	
Small Malaita	William Nii Haomae	Independent	164	6.18	
Small Malaita	John S. Watemae	Independent	123	4.63	
Small Malaita	Christian Moffat Suiga	Independent	116	4.37	
Small Malaita	Stanley Walakutu	Independent	110	4.14	
Small Malaita	Peter Wateoli	National Democratic Party	94	3.54	
Small Malaita	Emanuel Rapumanu	Independent	47	1.77	
South Choiseul	Jason Dorovolomo	Solomon Islands United Party	454	25.66	Re-elected
South Choiseul	Harrison Benjamin	People's Alliance Party	333	18.82	
South Choiseul	Franklin Pitakaka	Independent	333	18.82	
South Choiseul	Isaac Qoloni	Independent	219	12.38	
South Choiseul	Rence Kodosiku	Independent	161	9.10	
South Choiseul	Leadly Mediko	Independent	81	4.58	
South Choiseul	Metcalf Pitasopa	Independent	80	4.52	
South Choiseul	Binet Gadebeta	Independent	69	3.90	
South Choiseul	Billy Takubala	Independent	39	2.20	
South Guadalcanal	Sethuel Kelly	Solomon Agu Segu-Fenua	785	44.93	Elected
South Guadalcanal	Victor Samuel Ngele	Solomon Islands United Party	546	31.25	
South Guadalcanal	Stephen Cheka	People's Alliance Party	416	23.81	
Temotu Nende	Ataban M Tropa	People's Alliance Party	1,018	49.76	Re-elected
Temotu Nende	Robert Mewebu	National Democratic Party	503	24.58	
Temotu Nende	Peter Noli	Independent	401	19.60	
Temotu Nende	John Melanoli	Independent	124	6.06	
Temotu Pele	Simon Peter Leinga	People's Alliance Party	344	22.14	Elected
Temotu Pele	John Baddley Bakila	National Democratic Party	309	19.88	
Temotu Pele	Clement Jimmy Natei	Solomon Agu Segu-Fenua	268	17.25	
Temotu Pele	Simon Keire	Independent	214	13.77	
Temotu Pele	Ezekiel Maai Alolo	Independent	187	12.03	
Temotu Pele	Moffat Bonunga	Solomon Islands United Party	175	11.26	Unseated
Temotu Pele	David Dawea Taukalo	Independent	57	3.67	
Ulawa/Ugi	Andrew Mamau	People's Alliance Party	556	56.73	Re-elected
Ulawa/Ugi	Geoffrey Loloito	Solomon Agu Segu-Fenua	178	18.16	
Ulawa/Ugi	Frank Porara	Solomon Islands United Party	109	11.12	
Ulawa/Ugi	Moffat Ramoni	Independent	61	6.22	
Ulawa/Ugi	Mathias Sitana	National Democratic Party	57	5.82	
Ulawa/Ugi	Michael Umaleo	Independent	19	1.94	
Vella Lavella	Seth G. Lekelalu	Solomon Islands United Party	989	54.73	Elected
Vella Lavella	George Talasasa	People's Alliance Party	520	28.78	Unseated
Vella Lavella	Andrew Kukuti	Independent	298	16.49	
Vona Vona/Rendova/Tetepari	Danny Philip	Solomon Agu Segu-Fenua	480	30.34	Elected
Vona Vona/Rendova/Tetepari	Willie Lianga	People's Alliance Party	283	17.89	
Vona Vona/Rendova/Tetepari	Richard Boso	Independent	234	14.79	
Vona Vona/Rendova/Tetepari	Frank Jamakana	Independent	217	13.72	
Vona Vona/Rendova/Tetepari	Hugh Soakai	Solomon Islands United Party	179	11.31	Unseated
Vona Vona/Rendova/Tetepari	Maekera Viuru	Independent	114	7.21	
Vona Vona/Rendova/Tetepari	Rex Biku	Independent	75	4.74	
West ꞌAreꞌare	David Kausimae	People's Alliance Party	428	33.26	Elected
West ꞌAreꞌare	Alfred Aihunu	Solomon Islands United Party	394	30.61	Unseated
West ꞌAreꞌare	John Asipara	Solomon Agu Segu-Fenua	222	17.25	
West ꞌAreꞌare	Timothy Kauhiona	Independent	97	7.54	
West ꞌAreꞌare	Albert Hauhare	Independent	74	5.75	
West ꞌAreꞌare	John Manewai	Independent	56	4.35	
West ꞌAreꞌare	John Mare Aihunu	Independent	16	1.24	
West Guadalcanal	George Kejoa	Independent	557	26.15	Elected
West Guadalcanal	Orlie Torling	Independent	476	22.35	
West Guadalcanal	Bernard Garo	Solomon Agu Segu-Fenua	331	15.54	
West Guadalcanal	Kamilo Teke	People's Alliance Party	243	11.41	Unseated
West Guadalcanal	Bartholomew Buchanan	Independent	200	9.39	
West Guadalcanal	Matthew Belamataga	Solomon Islands Cultural Traditional Leaders Movement	159	7.46	
West Guadalcanal	John Toto	National Democratic Party	117	5.49	
West Guadalcanal	George Wilson Mangale	Independent	47	2.21	
West Honiara	Ben Gale	Solomon Islands United Party	484	33.04	Elected
West Honiara	Andrew Nori	People's Alliance Party	351	23.96	
West Honiara	Peter Vincent Bennett	National Democratic Party	245	16.72	
West Honiara	Gordon Billy Gatu	Independent	152	10.38	Unseated
West Honiara	Stephen Martin	Solomon Agu Segu-Fenua	89	6.08	
West Honiara	Duddley Wate	Independent	62	4.23	
West Honiara	Patrick Leta	Independent	42	2.87	
West Honiara	William Taisia	Independent	21	1.43	
West Honiara	Edwin Sitori	Solomon Islands Cultural Traditional Leaders Movement	19	1.30	
West Isabel	Dennis Carlos Lulei	Independent	1,384	60.68	Re-elected
West Isabel	Lily O. Poznanski	Solomon Islands Cultural Traditional Leaders Movement	511	22.40	
West Isabel	Nelson Kehe Kile	People's Alliance Party	386	16.92	
West Kwaio	Jonathan Wesley Kuka	Solomon Islands United Party	551	31.54	Re-elected
West Kwaio	Sam Philip Korasimora	People's Alliance Party	232	13.28	
West Kwaio	Abraham Baeanisia	National Democratic Party	217	12.42	
West Kwaio	John Ale	Independent	199	11.39	
West Kwaio	Paul Andrew Foasi	Independent	187	10.70	
West Kwaio	John Martin Garo	Independent	154	8.82	
West Kwaio	Lawrence Utaka	Independent	65	3.72	
West Kwaio	Eustace Ingi	Independent	46	2.63	
West Kwaio	Jack Francis Ross	Solomon Agu Segu-Fenua	44	2.52	
West Kwaio	Adrian Eddy Bibimauri	Independent	33	1.89	
West Kwaio	Jungle Holy Deve	Independent	19	1.09	
West Kwara'ae	Stephen Tonafalea	Independent	728	29.17	Elected
West Kwara'ae	Leonard Maenuna	Solomon Islands United Party	445	17.83	
West Kwara'ae	Robert Wilson Aioro	Solomon Islands Cultural Traditional Leaders Movement	350	14.02	
West Kwara'ae	Alan Taki	Independent	279	11.18	Unseated
West Kwara'ae	Nelson Kifo	Independent	231	9.25	
West Kwara'ae	Patrick Liufo'oa Gwaimaoa	People's Alliance Party	143	5.73	
West Kwara'ae	Francis Lulumani	National Democratic Party	121	4.85	
West Kwara'ae	Geoffrey Anii	Independent	118	4.73	
West Kwara'ae	M. J. Lioa	Independent	81	3.25	
West Makira	Solomon S. Mamaloni	Independent	1,711	77.99	Re-elected
West Makira	Mathias Taro	Solomon Agu Segu-Fenua	248	11.30	
West Makira	Gad Hagasuramo	Independent	163	7.43	
West Makira	John Marahora	Solomon Islands Cultural Traditional Leaders Movement	72	3.28	

== Aftermath ==
Following the elections, Peter Kenilorea was elected Prime Minister on 24 October, defeating Solomon Mamaloni by 21 votes to 13. All twelve People's Alliance Party MPs and the sole National Democratic Party MP voted for Mamaloni, while the thirteen Solomon Islands United Party MPs, four Solomon Agu Segu-Fenua MPs and four independents voted for Kenilorea.
