= 1993 Solomon Islands general election =

- 26 May 1993
- All 47 seats in the National Parliament; 24 seats needed for a majority
Prime Minister before	Prime Minister after
Solomon Mamaloni; People's Alliance	Francis Billy Hilly; SIGNUR

General elections were held in the Solomon Islands on 26 May 1993. A record total of 280 candidates contested the election, the result of which was a victory for the new SIGNUR party. However, it failed to achieve a majority in Parliament, and its leader, Solomon Mamaloni, was defeated in the election for Prime Minister by Francis Billy Hilly.

== Results ==
Party	Votes	%	Seats
SIGNUR	16,835	15.84	14
People's Alliance Party	14,071	13.24	7
National Action Party	6,560	6.17	2
National Front for Progress	5,663	5.33	1
Solomon Islands United Party	5,635	5.30	1
Solomon Islands Labour Party	4,482	4.22	4
SIGNUR/National Front for Progress	4,459	4.19	2
SIGNUR/National Action Party/People's Alliance Party	2,906	2.73	1
SIGNUR/Solomon Islands United Party	2,884	2.71	2
National Action Party/People's Alliance Party	1,472	1.38	0
SIGNUR/National Action Party/National Front for Progress	1,266	1.19	1
National Action Party/Solomon Islands United Party	1,154	1.09	1
People's Alliance Party/National Front for Progress	547	0.51	1
Solomon Islands Labour Party/SIGNUR	441	0.41	0
Independent	37,937	35.68	10
Total	106,312	100.00	47
Registered voters/turnout	160,702	–	
Source: Solomon Islands Election Resources

=== By constituency ===
Results by constituency
Constituency	Electorate	Candidate	Party	Votes	%	Notes
Aoke/Langalanga	3,043	Francis Joseph Saemala	National Action Party	1,139	50.40	Re-elected
Aoke/Langalanga	3,043	Batholomew Ulufa'alu	Independent	959	42.50	
Aoke/Langalanga	3,043	Philip Jack Aru	United Party	126	5.60	
Aoke/Langalanga	3,043	Harold Maomatekwa	Independent	35	1.50	
Baegu/Asifola	3,436	Walter Folotalu	Independent	332	17.60	Elected
Baegu/Asifola	3,436	Anthony Water	Independent	254	13.50	
Baegu/Asifola	3,436	Selwyn Suri	SIGNUR	198	10.50	
Baegu/Asifola	3,436	Ben Misiga	Independent	180	9.60	
Baegu/Asifola	3,436	Leberio Idufanua	Independent	169	9.00	
Baegu/Asifola	3,436	James Iroga	People's Alliance Party	165	8.80	
Baegu/Asifola	3,436	Charles Oge	Independent	151	8.00	
Baegu/Asifola	3,436	Daniel Aba	National Front for Progress	149	7.90	
Baegu/Asifola	3,436	Charles Fox Akao	United Party	120	6.40	
Baegu/Asifola	3,436	Seti Faefafia	Independent	68	3.60	
Baegu/Asifola	3,436	Jack Inifiri	People's Alliance Party	47	2.50	
Baegu/Asifola	3,436	Richard Taloga	Independent	44	2.30	
Baegu/Asifola	3,436	Jeriel Faiga	Independent	4	0.20	
Baegu/Asifola	3,436	Joseph Tutu	Independent	2	0.10	
Central Guadalcanal	3,477	Cain Eric Seri	Labour Party	827	32.70	Elected
Central Guadalcanal	3,477	Joseph Bobby Naesol	Independent	804	31.80	
Central Guadalcanal	3,477	Paul Joseph Tovua	National Action Party	656	25.90	Unseated
Central Guadalcanal	3,477	David Kafaikao	Independent	242	9.60	
Central Kwara'ae	4,914	Alfred Maetia	SIGNUR/United Party	1,356	45.60	Re-elected
Central Kwara'ae	4,914	David Ganifiri	Independent	594	20.00	
Central Kwara'ae	4,914	Billy Fa'arobo	Independent	227	7.60	
Central Kwara'ae	4,914	Alick Samo	People's Alliance Party	225	7.60	
Central Kwara'ae	4,914	Daniel Lulutalo	National Front for Progress	177	5.90	
Central Kwara'ae	4,914	Joseph Baeoro Sanga	Independent	138	4.60	
Central Kwara'ae	4,914	William Misimanu	National Front for Progress	131	4.40	
Central Kwara'ae	4,914	Meshach Maebiru Maetoloa	Independent	127	4.30	
Central Makira	2,386	Benedict Kinika	Independent	483	28.30	Elected
Central Makira	2,386	Gad Hagasuramo	Labour Party/SIGNUR	441	25.90	
Central Makira	2,386	Japhet Waipora	People's Alliance Party	417	24.50	
Central Makira	2,386	William Dick Waitara	United Party	131	7.70	
Central Makira	2,386	Thomson Atu	National Front for Progress	88	5.20	
Central Makira	2,386	Casper Muna	National Action Party	74	4.30	
Central Makira	2,386	Raymond Mauriasi Ngeripwea	Independent	37	2.20	
Central Makira	2,386	William Taisia	United Party	33	1.90	
East ꞌAreꞌare	2,724	Edward Huniehu	National Action Party	909	51.90	Re-elected
East ꞌAreꞌare	2,724	Michael Wairamo	Independent	366	20.90	
East ꞌAreꞌare	2,724	Joe Kennedy	National Front for Progress	274	15.60	
East ꞌAreꞌare	2,724	Andrew Hanaria Keniasina	Independent	204	11.60	
East Central Guadalcanal	3,443	Hilda Thugea Kari	People's Alliance Party	1,317	50.00	Re-elected
East Central Guadalcanal	3,443	Hosley N. Tangikoba	National Front for Progress	559	21.20	
East Central Guadalcanal	3,443	Sam Mali	United Party	297	11.30	
East Central Guadalcanal	3,443	Gordon Tapalia	National Action Party	259	9.80	
East Central Guadalcanal	3,443	Alysios Tavoria	Independent	204	7.70	
East Choiseul	1,570	Allan Qurusu	SIGNUR	903	70.00	Re-elected
East Choiseul	1,570	Hence Vaekesa	People's Alliance Party	260	20.20	
East Choiseul	1,570	Paul Puqara Lekelalu	Independent	65	5.00	
East Choiseul	1,570	Jacab Sogavare	Independent	62	4.80	
East Guadalcanal	3,894	Ezekiel Alebua	United Party	668	27.90	Re-elected
East Guadalcanal	3,894	Johnson Koli	People's Alliance Party	621	26.00	
East Guadalcanal	3,894	Anastasius Oreimara	Independent	392	16.40	
East Guadalcanal	3,894	David Valusa	Independent	352	14.70	
East Guadalcanal	3,894	Chaniel Diki	Independent	249	10.40	
East Guadalcanal	3,894	Sam Iko	SIGNUR	109	4.60	
East Honiara	7,506	Charles Dausabea	SIGNUR	1,537	35.00	Re-elected
East Honiara	7,506	John Maetia Kaliuae	National Action Party	1,316	29.90	
East Honiara	7,506	Christina Garo	Independent	637	14.50	
East Honiara	7,506	Ronald Kuba Ziru	People's Alliance Party	537	12.20	
East Honiara	7,506	Jemuel Dick Laumalefo	Independent	151	3.40	
East Honiara	7,506	Augustine Manakako	United Party	148	3.40	
East Honiara	7,506	Duddley Paineitala	People's Alliance Party/National Front for Progress	69	1.60	
East Kwaio	4,094	John Fisango	SIGNUR	1,034	53.20	Re-elected
East Kwaio	4,094	Lee Silomo Kolosu	National Action Party/People's Alliance Party	330	17.00	
East Kwaio	4,094	Jared Oda Ngele	Independent	261	13.40	
East Kwaio	4,094	Samson Ubuni	National Front for Progress	199	10.20	
East Kwaio	4,094	Gideon Siofa	Independent	121	6.20	
East Makira	4,036	David Sitai	SIGNUR	1,549	50.90	Re-elected
East Makira	4,036	Noel Wagapu	Independent	611	20.10	
East Makira	4,036	Augustine Faruara	Independent	428	14.10	
East Makira	4,036	Warren Tereqora	Independent	259	8.50	
East Makira	4,036	Stanley S. Siapu	People's Alliance Party	107	3.50	
East Makira	4,036	Jude Edward Hagasua	Independent	89	2.90	
Fataleka	3,118	John Musuota	Independent	494	23.30	Elected
Fataleka	3,118	Jeffrey Iniota	Independent	389	18.30	
Fataleka	3,118	Johnson Moffat Ramoni	Independent	338	15.90	
Fataleka	3,118	Aloisio Tania	Independent	223	10.50	
Fataleka	3,118	Felix Laumae	Labour Party	210	9.90	
Fataleka	3,118	Ronald Ila Fugui	People's Alliance Party	170	8.00	
Fataleka	3,118	Alban Funasui Gua	Independent	121	5.70	
Fataleka	3,118	Joseph Taega	Independent	98	4.60	
Fataleka	3,118	Shemuel Siau	United Party	80	3.80	
Gao/Bugotu	2,543	Nathaniel Supa	SIGNUR	890	47.60	Re-elected
Gao/Bugotu	2,543	Culwick Maneguasa Vahia	People's Alliance Party	449	24.00	
Gao/Bugotu	2,543	Philip Manehata	Independent	226	12.10	
Gao/Bugotu	2,543	Rexford Orodaloa	Independent	176	9.40	
Gao/Bugotu	2,543	Jason Toni	Independent	128	6.80	
Gizo/Kolombangara	4,048	Jackson Piasi	Labour Party	884	35.30	Re-elected
Gizo/Kolombangara	4,048	Gordon Darcy Lilo	National Front for Progress	661	26.40	
Gizo/Kolombangara	4,048	Chris Taboua	People's Alliance Party	417	16.70	
Gizo/Kolombangara	4,048	Emelio Bul	Independent	150	6.00	
Gizo/Kolombangara	4,048	Nelson Toktok	Independent	136	5.40	
Gizo/Kolombangara	4,048	Lawry Eddie Wickham	Independent	131	5.20	
Gizo/Kolombangara	4,048	Eric Kikolo	Independent	125	5.00	
Hograno/Kia/Havulei	2,766	Edmond H Anderson	People's Alliance Party	1,132	54.70	Re-elected
Hograno/Kia/Havulei	2,766	Michael Evo	Independent	487	23.50	
Hograno/Kia/Havulei	2,766	Johnson Nodoro Vunagi	SIGNUR	450	21.70	
Lau/Mbaelelea	5,974	Charles Ferania Sale	People's Alliance Party	570	15.90	Elected
Lau/Mbaelelea	5,974	James Roni	SIGNUR	469	13.10	
Lau/Mbaelelea	5,974	Ben Foukona	National Front for Progress	432	12.10	Unseated
Lau/Mbaelelea	5,974	Frank Fulaga	United Party	396	11.10	
Lau/Mbaelelea	5,974	Paul Maenu'u	Independent	372	10.40	
Lau/Mbaelelea	5,974	Judson Lee Leafasia	Independent	330	9.20	
Lau/Mbaelelea	5,974	George Pama	Independent	301	8.40	
Lau/Mbaelelea	5,974	Steward Tatalu	Independent	202	5.70	
Lau/Mbaelelea	5,974	Pancrasio Manisi	Independent	174	4.90	
Lau/Mbaelelea	5,974	Frank O. Firimolea	Independent	139	3.90	
Lau/Mbaelelea	5,974	Timothy Bobongi	Independent	84	2.30	
Lau/Mbaelelea	5,974	Kwaimani K	Independent	52	1.50	
Lau/Mbaelelea	5,974	Alphonsus Selofae	Independent	33	0.90	
Lau/Mbaelelea	5,974	Sylvester Beata	Independent	21	0.60	
Malaita Outer Islands	1,125	Johnson Kengalu	Independent	260	32.90	Elected
Malaita Outer Islands	1,125	Joel Kaise	Independent	165	20.90	
Malaita Outer Islands	1,125	Abraham Kapei	People's Alliance Party	159	20.10	Unseated
Malaita Outer Islands	1,125	Reginald Holland Teutao	Independent	140	17.70	
Malaita Outer Islands	1,125	Benjamin Ishmael Keihou	Independent	45	5.70	
Malaita Outer Islands	1,125	Dorothy Prince	Independent	21	2.70	
Maringe/Kokota	3,510	Dennis Carlos Lulei	People's Alliance Party	952	35.40	Elected
Maringe/Kokota	3,510	Robert Perakana	SIGNUR	535	19.90	
Maringe/Kokota	3,510	Clement Rojumana	Independent	382	14.20	
Maringe/Kokota	3,510	Charles Fox Dikahehe	Independent	282	10.50	
Maringe/Kokota	3,510	Wilson Hane Sedere	Independent	214	8.00	
Maringe/Kokota	3,510	O'bed Klyde Alemaena	Independent	213	7.90	
Maringe/Kokota	3,510	Ewell Donne Sehamana	Independent	110	4.10	
Marovo	3,930	Christopher C. Abe	SIGNUR	1,440	59.20	Re-elected
Marovo	3,930	Ivan Kerovo Ngai	United Party	992	40.80	
Nggela	5,966	Gordon Mara	SIGNUR/National Action Party/People's Alliance Party	2,906	70.90	Re-elected
Nggela	5,966	Patterson Mae	Independent	1,193	29.10	
North East Guadalcanal	3,785	Baddlly Devesi	SIGNUR	462	17.20	Re-elected
North East Guadalcanal	3,785	Joel Arabola	United Party	349	13.00	
North East Guadalcanal	3,785	George Palua	People's Alliance Party	344	12.80	
North East Guadalcanal	3,785	Stephen Paeni	People's Alliance Party	279	10.40	
North East Guadalcanal	3,785	Gideon Moses	Labour Party	269	10.00	
North East Guadalcanal	3,785	Saul Teika	Independent	252	9.40	
North East Guadalcanal	3,785	Ishmael Robert Leuape	National Action Party	171	6.40	
North East Guadalcanal	3,785	Alfred Maeke	Independent	160	6.00	
North East Guadalcanal	3,785	James Vaele Vurua	Independent	122	4.50	
North East Guadalcanal	3,785	Simon Tonavi	Independent	112	4.20	
North East Guadalcanal	3,785	Gordon Leua	Independent	107	4.00	
North East Guadalcanal	3,785	John Victor Pepela	People's Alliance Party	62	2.30	
North Guadalcanal	2,934	David Vatamana Vouza	Labour Party	690	39.00	Elected
North Guadalcanal	2,934	David Thuguvoda	Independent	489	27.60	
North Guadalcanal	2,934	Alfred Thugea	Independent	251	14.20	
North Guadalcanal	2,934	Alice May Kaua	SIGNUR	236	13.30	
North Guadalcanal	2,934	Brown Saua	People's Alliance Party	103	5.80	
North New Georgia		Job Dudley Tausinga	SIGNUR	—	—	Re-elected unopposed
North Vella Lavella	1,488	Allan Paul	People's Alliance Party	595	48.00	Re-elected
North Vella Lavella	1,488	Thornley Hite	Independent	498	40.20	
North Vella Lavella	1,488	Pye Robert Kuve	SIGNUR/National Front for Progress	146	11.80	
North West Choiseul	2,614	Alpha Kimata	Independent	521	24.80	Elected
North West Choiseul	2,614	Romano Nogebatu	Independent	487	23.20	
North West Choiseul	2,614	Franklin Papopatu	National Front for Progress	293	14.00	
North West Choiseul	2,614	Franklin Pitakaka	Independent	246	11.70	
North West Choiseul	2,614	Lemeus Manavakana	People's Alliance Party	238	11.30	
North West Choiseul	2,614	Jason Dorovolomo	United Party	204	9.70	
North West Choiseul	2,614	Simi Pitakaka	Independent	109	5.20	
North West Guadalcanal	4,525	Francis Orodani	People's Alliance Party	518	17.90	Elected
North West Guadalcanal	4,525	Philip Pupuka	Independent	503	17.40	
North West Guadalcanal	4,525	John Martin Garo	SIGNUR/National Front for Progress	384	13.30	
North West Guadalcanal	4,525	William Rapasia Deremae	United Party	287	9.90	
North West Guadalcanal	4,525	Roselyn Dettke	Independent	232	8.00	
North West Guadalcanal	4,525	Michael Liliau	National Action Party	195	6.70	
North West Guadalcanal	4,525	Stanley Keke	Independent	159	5.50	
North West Guadalcanal	4,525	Veleriano Chualu	Independent	155	5.30	
North West Guadalcanal	4,525	Gordon Billy Gatu	Independent	105	3.60	
North West Guadalcanal	4,525	Michael Ben Walahoula	Independent	93	3.20	
North West Guadalcanal	4,525	Bernadette Tadakusu	Independent	88	3.00	
North West Guadalcanal	4,525	Bartholomew Selea	Independent	87	3.00	
North West Guadalcanal	4,525	Damaso Roko	Independent	75	2.60	
North West Guadalcanal	4,525	Francis George Labu	Independent	17	0.60	
North West Malaita	4,187	Michael Maeliau	Independent	510	19.60	Elected
North West Malaita	4,187	John Edmond Foreman Sukina	National Action Party	333	12.80	Unseated
North West Malaita	4,187	Pateson Fulaburi	Independent	281	10.80	
North West Malaita	4,187	William Baeto	SIGNUR	244	9.40	
North West Malaita	4,187	Festus Suruma	Independent	244	9.40	
North West Malaita	4,187	Robert Gwaiga	Independent	195	7.50	
North West Malaita	4,187	Keti Kaura	Independent	166	6.40	
North West Malaita	4,187	John Seda Faiga	National Front for Progress	164	6.30	
North West Malaita	4,187	Rex Funusulia	Independent	113	4.30	
North West Malaita	4,187	Jesriel Irofanua	People's Alliance Party	93	3.60	
North West Malaita	4,187	Oirii K Wanaerara	Independent	90	3.50	
North West Malaita	4,187	Enorii E	Independent	56	2.20	
North West Malaita	4,187	Andrew Tonawane	Independent	49	1.90	
North West Malaita	4,187	Samuel S. Ofaio	Independent	37	1.40	
North West Malaita	4,187	Peter Irolanga	Independent	26	1.00	
Ranongga/Simbo	2,898	Francis Billy Hilly	Independent	781	37.80	Elected
Ranongga/Simbo	2,898	Reuben Lilo	SIGNUR	766	37.00	Unseated
Ranongga/Simbo	2,898	Jay Hong	Independent	396	19.10	
Ranongga/Simbo	2,898	Charles Kelly	Independent	77	3.70	
Ranongga/Simbo	2,898	Gina Tekulu	United Party	48	2.30	
Rennell/Bellona	2,039	Joses Taungenga Tuhanuku	Labour Party	593	49.40	Re-elected
Rennell/Bellona	2,039	Wilfred Hatigeva	SIGNUR	356	29.60	
Rennell/Bellona	2,039	Leonard Kaitu'u	People's Alliance Party	252	21.00	
Russells/Savo	3,725	Allan Kemakeza	Independent	1,978	66.20	Re-elected
Russells/Savo	3,725	Juvence Selevale	National Action Party/People's Alliance Party	705	23.60	
Russells/Savo	3,725	Mark Golu	United Party	303	10.10	
Shortland	1,736	Albert Bakale Laore	SIGNUR	753	65.80	Re-elected
Shortland	1,736	Peter J. Salaka	People's Alliance Party	262	22.90	
Shortland	1,736	Joseph Isang Pitu	National Front for Progress	130	11.40	
Small Malaita	5,586	William Nii Haomae	SIGNUR/National Action Party/National Front for Progress	1,266	37.20	Elected
Small Malaita	5,586	Alex Bartlett	United Party	763	22.40	Unseated
Small Malaita	5,586	Ellison Koke	Independent	491	14.40	
Small Malaita	5,586	Timothy Laesanau	Independent	452	13.30	
Small Malaita	5,586	James Henry Star Dora	People's Alliance Party	435	12.80	
South Choiseul	2,273	Caleb Kotali	SIGNUR	609	33.80	Re-elected
South Choiseul	2,273	Jerry Pitisopa	Independent	479	26.60	
South Choiseul	2,273	Joini Tutua	Independent	394	21.90	
South Choiseul	2,273	Alfred Sasa Biliki	Independent	318	17.70	
South Guadalcanal	3,006	Victor Samuel Ngele	SIGNUR/United Party	1,528	87.40	Re-elected
South Guadalcanal	3,006	Victor Alikivara	Independent	220	12.60	
South New Georgia/Rendova/Tetepari	3,045	Danny Philip	SIGNUR	705	32.00	Re-elected
South New Georgia/Rendova/Tetepari	3,045	Rodrick Terry Kera	Independent	635	28.80	
South New Georgia/Rendova/Tetepari	3,045	Solomon Roni	Independent	370	16.80	
South New Georgia/Rendova/Tetepari	3,045	Willie Lianga	Independent	235	10.70	
South New Georgia/Rendova/Tetepari	3,045	Joseph Douglas Alamu	People's Alliance Party	131	5.90	
South New Georgia/Rendova/Tetepari	3,045	Dova Winston Sale	Independent	126	5.70	
South Vella Lavella	2,052	Oliver Sapo	People's Alliance Party/National Front for Progress	478	31.70	Elected
South Vella Lavella	2,052	Seth G. Lekelalu	Independent	382	25.30	
South Vella Lavella	2,052	Danny Bula	National Front for Progress	315	20.90	
South Vella Lavella	2,052	Simon Castro Hong	Labour Party	124	8.20	
South Vella Lavella	2,052	Trevor Olavae	SIGNUR	109	7.20	
South Vella Lavella	2,052	Amison Solingi Olavae	Independent	59	3.90	
South Vella Lavella	2,052	Jonah Anama	Independent	43	2.80	
Temotu Nende	4,990	Charles Brown Beu	SIGNUR/National Front for Progress	1,606	45.00	Elected
Temotu Nende	4,990	John Patterson Oti	National Action Party	1,023	28.70	
Temotu Nende	4,990	Robert Mewebu	People's Alliance Party	516	14.50	
Temotu Nende	4,990	Philp Ariki	Labour Party	354	9.90	
Temotu Nende	4,990	Frank Bollen Ablali	Independent	67	1.90	
Temotu Pele	3,968	Michael Maina	SIGNUR/National Front for Progress	2,323	83.00	Re-elected
Temotu Pele	3,968	Martin Teddy Magga	National Action Party/People's Alliance Party	437	15.60	
Temotu Pele	3,968	Joseph Albert Fafale	Independent	38	1.40	
Ulawa/Ugi	1,761	Nathaniel Rahumae Waena	People's Alliance Party	1,028	78.60	Re-elected
Ulawa/Ugi	1,761	Edward Hutaiwao	SIGNUR	280	21.40	
West ꞌAreꞌare	2,346	Andrew Nori	National Front for Progress	540	30.30	Re-elected
West ꞌAreꞌare	2,346	Alfred Hairiu	SIGNUR	519	29.10	
West ꞌAreꞌare	2,346	David Kausimae	People's Alliance Party	383	21.50	
West ꞌAreꞌare	2,346	John Asipara	Independent	315	17.60	
West ꞌAreꞌare	2,346	Alfred Aihunu	Labour Party	28	1.60	
West Guadalcanal	3,025	George Kejoa	National Action Party/United Party	1,154	51.10	Re-elected
West Guadalcanal	3,025	Samson Teteha	Independent	467	20.70	
West Guadalcanal	3,025	Edme Ziokera	National Front for Progress	236	10.40	
West Guadalcanal	3,025	Caroline Tracy Mariu	Independent	229	10.10	
West Guadalcanal	3,025	Joseph Tangotsaku	Independent	173	7.70	
West Honiara	5,754	Walton Willy Abuito'o	Independent	470	16.10	Elected
West Honiara	5,754	Ben Gale	SIGNUR	419	14.40	Unseated
West Honiara	5,754	Warren Paia	United Party	384	13.20	
West Honiara	5,754	Edward Kingmele	People's Alliance Party	344	11.80	
West Honiara	5,754	Swanson Cornelius Konofilia	Independent	316	10.80	
West Honiara	5,754	Leonard Maenu'u	Independent	287	9.80	
West Honiara	5,754	Joseph Atkin Maelaua	Independent	232	8.00	
West Honiara	5,754	Paul Baekalia	Labour Party	217	7.40	
West Honiara	5,754	Martin Alufurai	National Front for Progress	139	4.80	
West Honiara	5,754	Philip Solodia	Independent	110	3.80	
West Kwaio	3,465	George Luialamo	SIGNUR	907	38.70	Re-elected
West Kwaio	3,465	Jose Maenaasi Bobby	National Action Party	485	20.70	
West Kwaio	3,465	Paul Andrew Foasi	Independent	379	16.20	
West Kwaio	3,465	William Gege	Independent	328	14.00	
West Kwaio	3,465	Christian Bili	Independent	228	9.70	
West Kwaio	3,465	Jack Francis Ross	Independent	15	0.60	
West Kwara'ae	7,580	Sam Alasia	SIGNUR	1,356	31.60	Re-elected
West Kwara'ae	7,580	Dioko Funufaka	National Front for Progress	742	17.30	
West Kwara'ae	7,580	Stephen Tonafalea	People's Alliance Party	723	16.90	
West Kwara'ae	7,580	Mathew Edward Maefai	Independent	525	12.20	
West Kwara'ae	7,580	Malcolm Maefilia	Independent	463	10.80	
West Kwara'ae	7,580	Robert Wilson Aioro	Labour Party	176	4.10	
West Kwara'ae	7,580	Chris Suaga	Independent	166	3.90	
West Kwara'ae	7,580	Collin Gauwane	Independent	135	3.10	
West Makira		Solomon S. Mamaloni	SIGNUR	—	—	Re-elected unopposed
West New Georgia/Vona Vona	4,417	Nelson Boso	Independent	516	18.90	Elected
West New Georgia/Vona Vona	4,417	David Ernest Kera	Independent	445	16.30	
West New Georgia/Vona Vona	4,417	Holmes Patao Saeva	National Front for Progress	434	15.90	
West New Georgia/Vona Vona	4,417	Binet Gadebeta	United Party	306	11.20	
West New Georgia/Vona Vona	4,417	Benjo Patterson Runikera	Independent	248	9.10	
West New Georgia/Vona Vona	4,417	Ian Kopele Talasasa	People's Alliance Party	220	8.00	
West New Georgia/Vona Vona	4,417	Matson Doava Gasimata	Independent	217	7.90	
West New Georgia/Vona Vona	4,417	Hugh Soakai	Independent	214	7.80	
West New Georgia/Vona Vona	4,417	John Talasasa	Labour Party	110	4.00	
West New Georgia/Vona Vona	4,417	Mark Voda Bisili	Independent	27	1.00	
