= Monarchy of Solomon Islands =

King of Solomon Islands
- Coat of arms of Solomon Islands

Incumbent
- Charles III since 8 September 2022

Details
- Style: His Majesty
- Heir apparent: William, Prince of Wales
- First monarch: Elizabeth II
- Formed: 7 July 1978

The monarchy of Solomon Islands is a system of government in which a hereditary monarch is the sovereign and head of state of Solomon Islands. The monarch and head of state, since 8 September 2022, is King Charles III. As sovereign, he is the personal embodiment of the Crown of Solomon Islands. Although the person of the sovereign is equally shared with 14 other independent countries within the Commonwealth of Nations, each country's monarchy is separate and legally distinct. As a result, the current monarch is officially titled King of Solomon Islands and, in this capacity, he and other members of the royal family undertake public and private functions domestically and abroad as representatives of Solomon Islands. However, the King is the only member of the royal family with any constitutional role.

All executive authority is vested in the monarch, and royal assent is required for the National Parliament of Solomon Islands to enact laws and for letters patent and Orders in Council to have legal effect. But the authority for these acts stems from the country's populace, in which sovereignty is vested, and the monarch's direct participation in any of these areas of governance is limited. Most of the powers are exercised by the elected members of parliament, the ministers of the Crown generally drawn from amongst them, and the judges and justices of the peace.

The Crown today primarily functions as a guarantor of continuous and stable governance and a nonpartisan safeguard against the abuse of power. While some powers are exercisable only by the sovereign, most of the monarch's operational and ceremonial duties are exercised by his representative, the governor-general of Solomon Islands.

== History ==
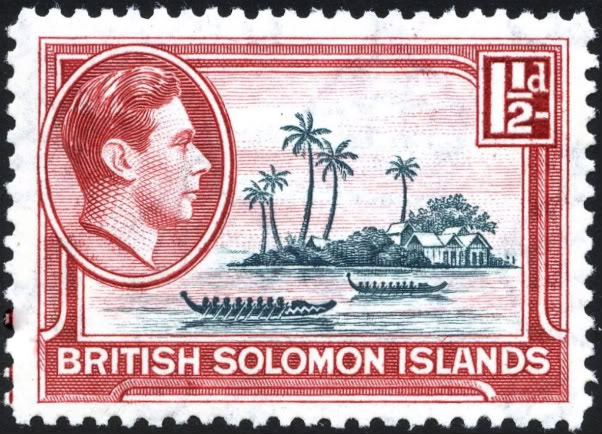
A 1938 stamp featuring King George VI

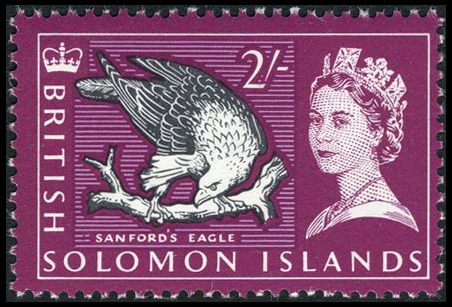
A 1965 stamp featuring Queen Elizabeth II

In 1884, Germany annexed north-east New Guinea and the Bismarck Archipelago, and in 1886 they extended their rule over the North Solomon Islands. In 1886, Germany and Britain confirmed this arrangement, with the British gaining a "sphere of influence" over the southern Solomons. The British Solomon Islands Protectorate was declared in 1893, partly in response to abuses associated with labour recruitment and partly to regulate contacts between islanders and European settlers but mainly to forestall a threat of annexation by France. Colonial rule began in 1896. During World War II, the Solomon Islands campaign (1942–1945) saw fierce fighting between the United States, British Commonwealth forces and the Empire of Japan, including the Battle of Guadalcanal. After the war, Honiara on Guadalcanal became the new capital, replacing Tulagi. Subsequently, the Solomons set out on the path of constitutional development and decolonisation.

Appointed Executive and Legislative Councils were established in 1960, with a degree of elected Solomon Islander representation introduced in 1964 and then extended in 1967. A new constitution was drawn up in 1970 which merged the two Councils into one Governing Council, though the British Governor still retained extensive powers. A new constitution in 1974 reduced much of the Governor's remaining powers and created the post of Chief Minister, with full self-government for the territory achieved in 1976.

The original draft constitution of Solomon Islands passed by the Legislative Assembly in March 1977 provided for the country to become a republic one year after independence, unless a two-thirds majority in the national parliament voted to retain the monarchy. Following the transitional period the governor-general at the time would then become the inaugural president of the new republic. British officials opposed this formula on the grounds that it was too complicated and that Solomon Islands should choose its method of government upon independence. Negotiations in London in September 1977 between Solomons leaders and the British government produced a final draft constitution which omitted references to a republic. The British Parliament's passage of the Solomon Islands Act 1978 allowed the country to become a sovereign state and an independent constitutional monarchy on 7 July 1978, with Queen Elizabeth II as head of state and Queen of Solomon Islands.

Prince Richard, Duke of Gloucester represented the Queen at the independence celebrations in July 1978. On 7 July, after the flag-raising ceremony, Baddeley Devesi and Peter Kenilorea took their oaths of office as governor-general and prime minister, respectively. The Duke, who delivered his speech in Pijin, said: "Today onefella big day, hemi come now. Country belong you fella, hemi grow up, and Queen hemi wantim every something belong you fella. E come up goodfellow long or get a years, bye bye e come."

== The Crown of Solomon Islands and its aspects ==
The flag of the governor-general featuring St Edward's Crown

Solomon Islands is one of fifteen independent nations, known as Commonwealth realms, which shares its sovereign with other realms in the Commonwealth of Nations, with the monarch's relationship with Solomon Islands completely independent from his position as monarch of any other realm. Despite sharing the same person as their respective monarch, each of the Commonwealth realms — including Solomon Islands — is sovereign and independent of the others. The Solomon Island monarch is represented by a viceroy—the governor-general of Solomon Islands—in the country.

This land is the most beautiful place imaginable, and the people of the Solomon Islands are amongst the most gracious and friendly we have ever met. The Queen told us this would be so, and as with so much else in her long reign, Her Majesty was absolutely right.

— Prince William, Duke of Cambridge, 2012

Since the independence of Solomon Islands in 1978, the pan-national Crown has had both a shared and a separate character and the sovereign's role as monarch of Solomon Islands is distinct to his or her position as monarch of any other realm, including the United Kingdom. The monarchy thus ceased to be an exclusively British institution and in Solomon Islands became a Solomon Island, or "domesticated" establishment.

This division is illustrated in a number of ways: The sovereign, for example, holds a unique Solomon Island title and, when he is acting in public specifically as a representative of Solomon Islands, he uses, where possible, national symbols of Solomon Islands, including the country's national flag, unique royal symbols, and the like. Also, only Solomon Island government ministers can advise the sovereign on matters of Solomon Islands.

In Solomon Islands, the legal personality of the State is referred to as "His Majesty in right of Solomon Islands" or the "Crown in right of Solomon Islands".

=== Title ===
Although Queen Elizabeth II became head of state of Solomon Islands upon independence in 1978, it was not until 2013 that the National Parliament passed the Royal Style and Titles Act 2013, which legally granted the monarch separate style and titles in relation to Solomon Islands. Upon the commencement of the act, the Queen's official style and titles became: Elizabeth the Second, by the Grace of God, Queen of Solomon Islands and Her other Realms and Territories, Head of the Commonwealth. These new style and titles were already in non-statutory use since 1988, when it was included in the Ministry of Foreign Affairs and External Trade Manual.

Since the accession of King Charles III, the monarch's title is: Charles the Third, by the Grace of God, King of Solomon Islands and His other Realms and Territories, Head of the Commonwealth.

When Queen Elizabeth II first visited Solomon Islands in 1974, she was given the title Fau Ni Qweraasi, meaning "a people’s protector", by chief Simeon Kariqwongi of Star Harbour in south-east Makira.

=== Oath of allegiance ===
As the embodiment of the state, the monarch is the locus of oaths of Allegiance. This is done in reciprocation to the sovereign's Coronation Oath, wherein they promise to govern the peoples of their realms, "according to their respective laws and customs".

The oath of allegiance in Solomon Islands is:

"I, (name), swear [or solemnly affirm] that I will be faithful and bear true allegiance to His Majesty King Charles the Third, His Heirs and Successors, according to law. [So help me God.]"

=== Succession ===
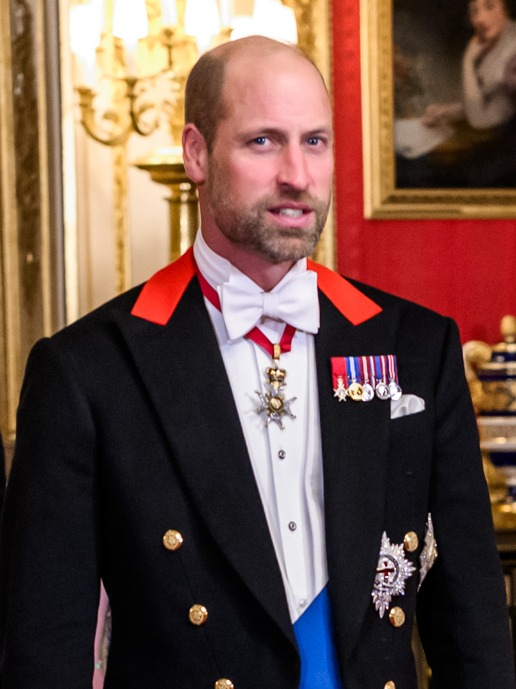
William, Prince of Wales, is the current heir apparent to the throne of Solomon Islands

Like some realms, Solomon Islands defers to United Kingdom law to determine the line of succession.

Succession is by absolute primogeniture governed by the provisions of the Succession to the Crown Act 2013, as well as the Act of Settlement, 1701, and the Bill of Rights, 1689. This legislation limits the succession to the natural (i.e. non-adopted), legitimate descendants of Sophia, Electress of Hanover, and stipulates that the monarch cannot be a Roman Catholic, and must be in communion with the Church of England upon ascending the throne. Though these constitutional laws, as they apply to Solomon Islands, still lie within the control of the British Parliament, both the United Kingdom and Solomon Islands cannot change the rules of succession without the unanimous consent of the other realms, unless explicitly leaving the shared monarchy relationship; a situation that applies identically in all the other realms, and which has been likened to a treaty amongst these countries.

Upon a demise of the Crown (the death or abdication of a sovereign), it is customary for the accession of the new monarch to be publicly proclaimed by the governor-general in the capital, Honiara, after the accession. Regardless of any proclamations, the late sovereign's heir immediately and automatically succeeds, without any need for confirmation or further ceremony. An appropriate period of mourning also follows, during which flags across the country are flown at half-mast to honour the late monarch. A day of mourning to commemorate the late monarch is likely to be a public holiday.

== Constitutional role and royal prerogative ==
In 1975, the people of this country decided to recommend to the then Constitutional Committee that Her Majesty The Queen become the Head of State. This view was enshrined in our Constitution on Independence in 1978.

— Former Governor-General Sir Frank Kabui, 2022

The Constitution of Solomon Islands gives Solomon Islands a similar parliamentary system of government as the other Commonwealth realms. All executive authority of the people of Solomon Islands is vested in the monarch, who is represented in the country by a governor-general — appointed by the sovereign in accordance with an address from the National Parliament.

The role of the monarch and the governor-general is both legal and practical; the Crown is regarded as a corporation, in which several parts share the authority of the whole, with the monarch as the person at the centre of the constitutional construct. The Solomon Islands government is also thus formally referred to as His Majesty's Government of Solomon Islands.

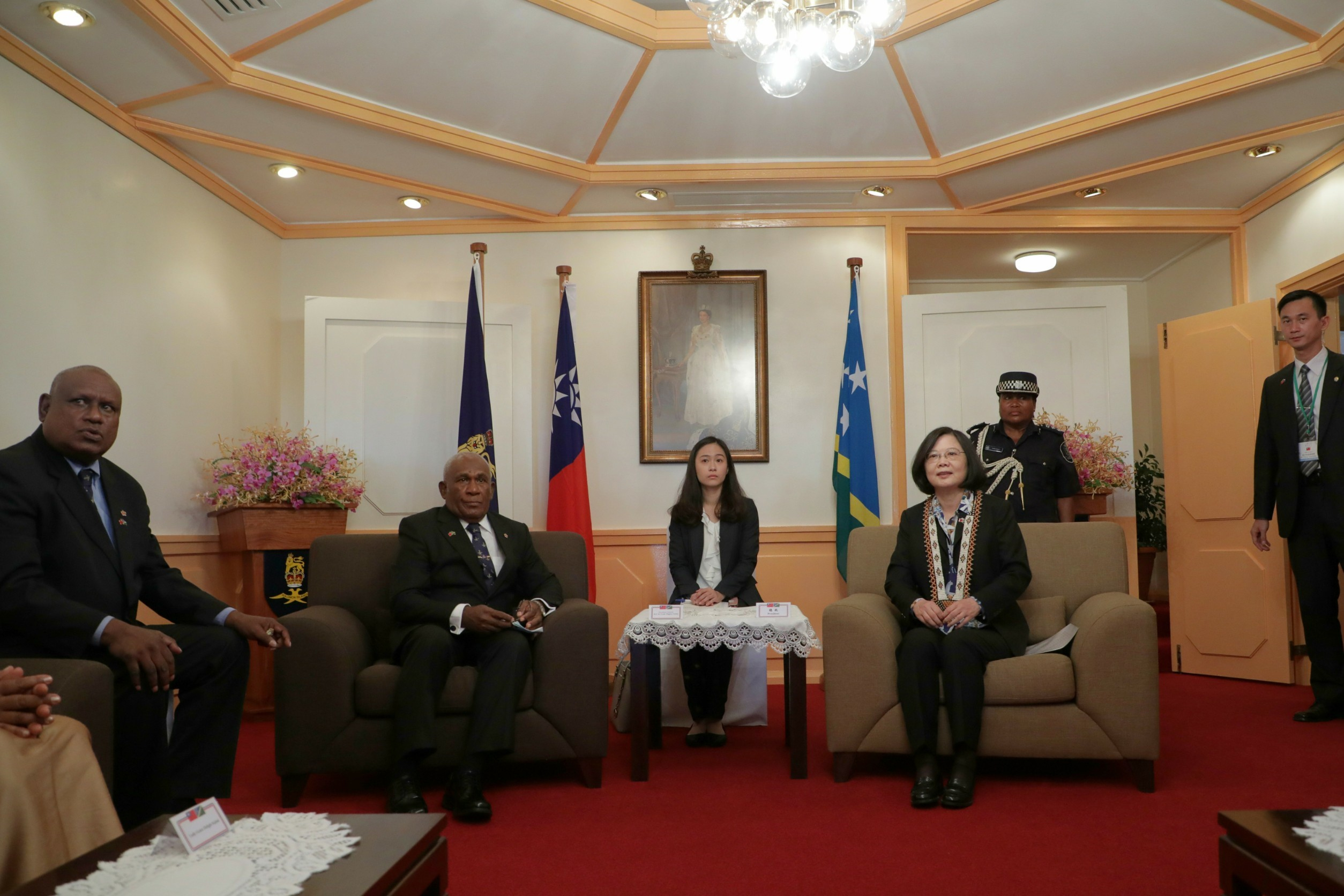
Governor-General Sir Frank Kabui hosting President Tsai Ing-wen of Taiwan at Government House, 2017

The vast powers that belong to the Crown are collectively known as the Royal Prerogative, which includes many powers such as the ability to make treaties or send ambassadors, as well as certain duties such as to defend the realm and to maintain the King's peace.

=== Executive ===
The prime minister, who heads the Cabinet of Solomon Islands, is responsible for advising the monarch or governor-general on how to execute their executive powers over all aspects of government operations and foreign affairs. The monarch's, and thereby the viceroy's role is almost entirely symbolic and cultural, acting as a symbol of the legal authority under which all governments and agencies operate, while the Cabinet directs the use of the Royal Prerogative, which includes the privilege to declare war, maintain the King's peace, as well as to fix the date of general elections. The Royal Prerogative belongs to the Crown and not to any of the ministers, though it might have sometimes appeared that way.

There are also a few duties which are specifically performed by the monarch, such as appointing the governor-general.

The prime minister is elected by the members of the National Parliament in accordance with section 33 of the national constitution, at a meeting convened by the governor-general after each election or in the event of a vacancy. The governor-general additionally appoints a Cabinet, at the direction of the prime minister. The monarch is informed by his viceroy of the acceptance of the resignation of a prime minister and the swearing-in of a new prime minister and other members of the ministry, and he remains fully briefed through regular communications from his Solomon Island ministers. Members of various executive agencies and other officials are appointed by the Crown.

=== Foreign affairs ===
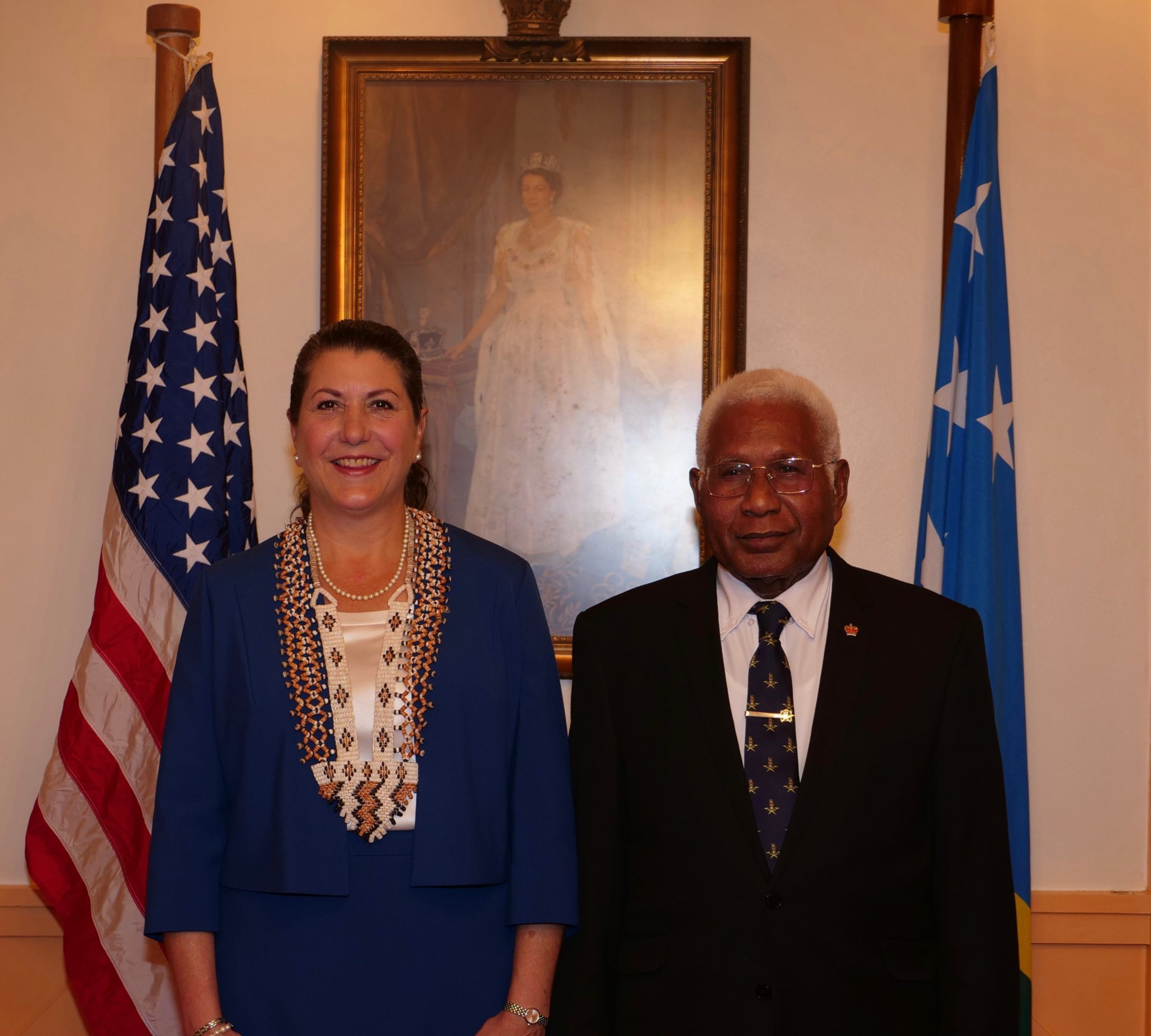
US ambassador Erin Elizabeth McKee with Governor-General Sir David Vunagi, 2020

The Royal Prerogative also extends to foreign affairs: the sovereign or the governor-general may negotiate and ratify treaties, alliances, and international agreements; no parliamentary approval is required. However, a treaty cannot alter the domestic laws of Solomon Islands; an Act of Parliament is necessary in such cases. The governor-general, on behalf of the monarch, also accredits Solomon Islands High Commissioners and ambassadors, and receives diplomats from foreign states.

=== Parliament ===
All laws in Solomon Islands are enacted only with the governor-general's granting of royal assent in the monarch's name, which cannot be refused and must be granted "forthwith". The viceroy additionally summons, prorogues, and dissolves parliament; after the latter, the writs for a general election are usually dropped by the governor-general at Government House, Honiara.

The new parliamentary session is marked by the State Opening of Parliament, during which the monarch or the governor-general reads the Speech from the Throne.

=== Courts ===
The sovereign is responsible for rendering justice for all his subjects, and is thus traditionally deemed the fount of justice. In Solomon Islands, criminal offences are legally deemed to be offences against the sovereign and proceedings for indictable offences are brought in the sovereign's name in the form of The King [or Queen] versus [Name], Rex [or Regina] versus [Name] or R versus [Name]. Hence, common law holds that the sovereign "can do no wrong"; the monarch cannot be prosecuted in his or her own courts for criminal offences.

The governor-general, on behalf of the monarch of Solomon Islands, can also grant immunity from prosecution, exercise the royal prerogative of mercy, and pardon offences against the Crown, either before, during, or after a trial. The granting of a pardon and the commutation of prison sentences is described in section 45 of the Constitution.

Judges of the High Court of Solomon Islands are appointed by the governor-general, on the advice of the Judicial and Legal Service Commission.

== Cultural role ==
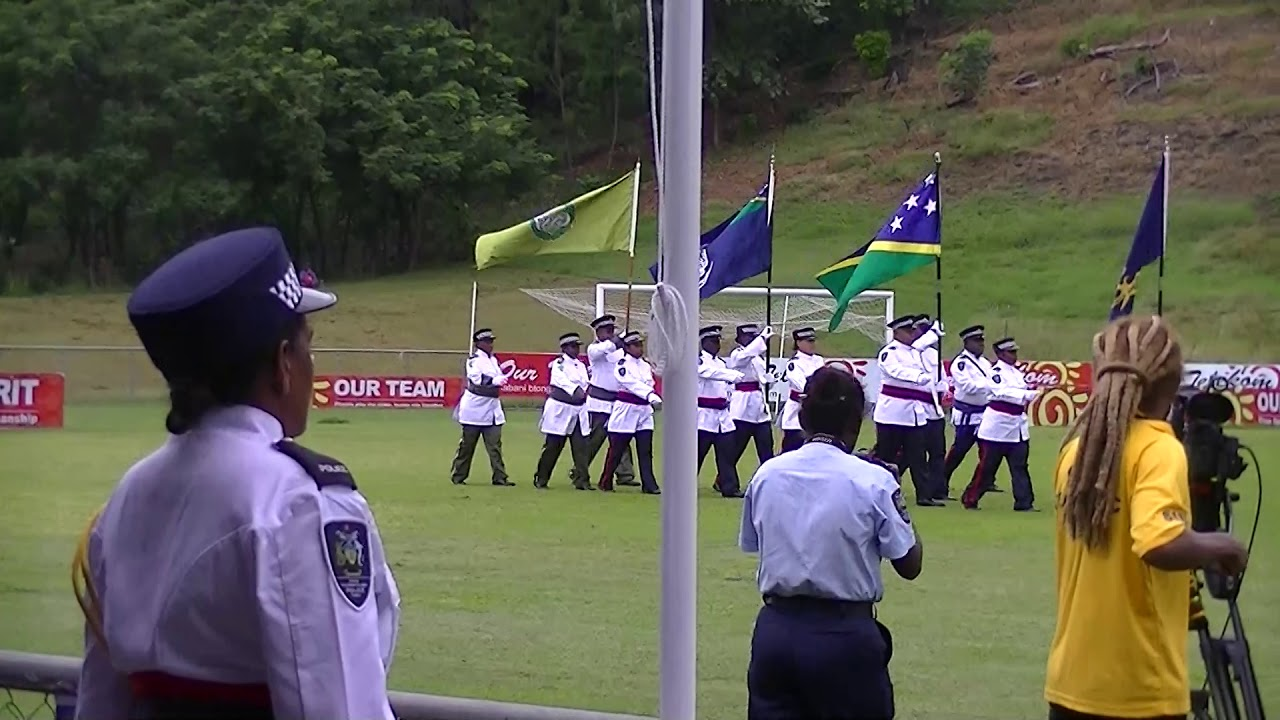
The Queen's Birthday Parade in Solomon Islands, 2019

The King's Official Birthday is a public holiday in Solomon Islands where it is usually celebrated on the second Saturday of June every year. It is regarded as one of the most important events of the year in the country. The day starts with the police marching band performing in the capital city of Honiara. Rallies are held all over the islands, which is followed by sporting events and custom dancing, and the celebrations and parties go long into the night.

The governor-general delivers a speech on the King's Birthday, and honours and medals are given to those who have rendered services to Solomon Islands.

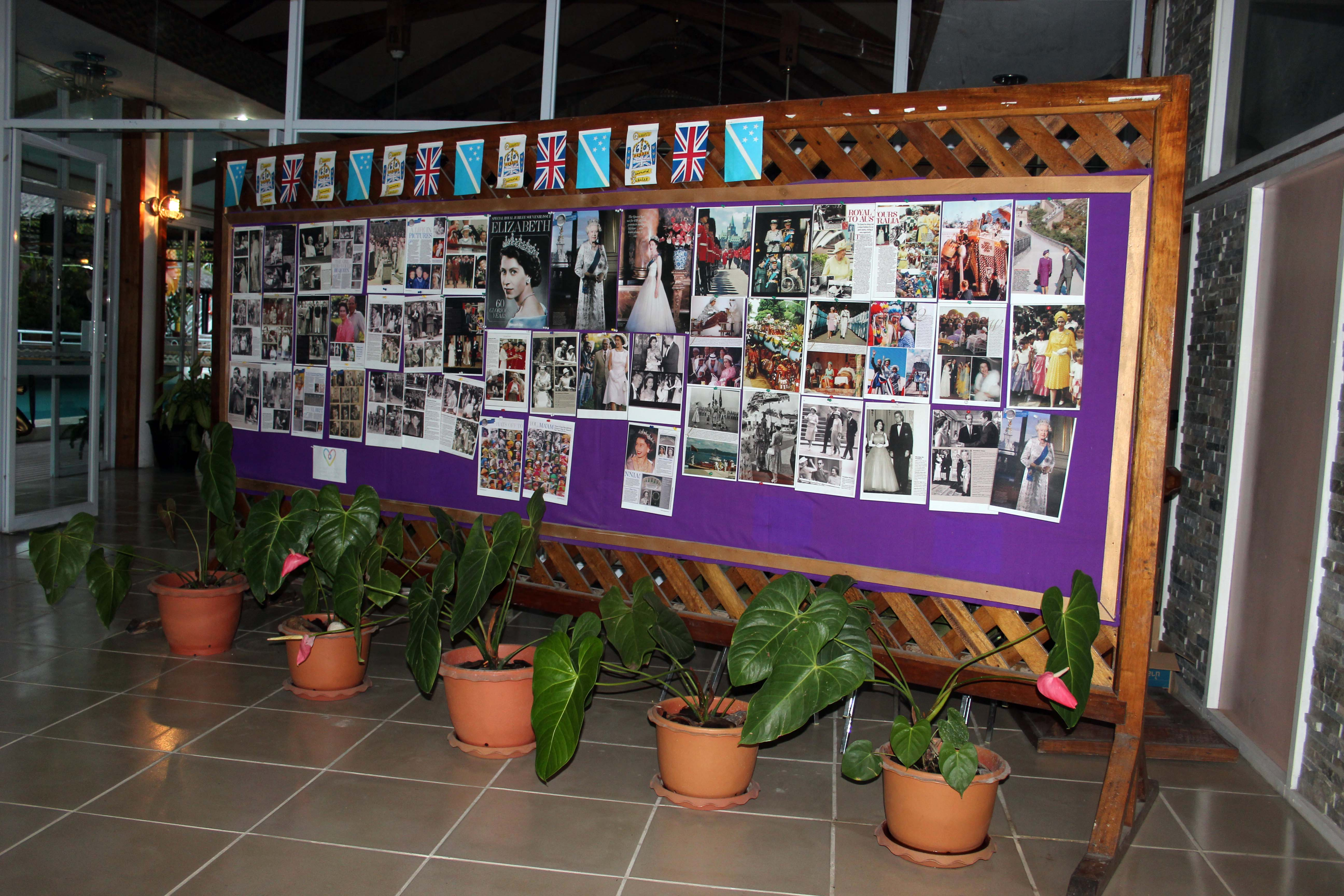
A picture display in Honiara commemorating the Diamond Jubilee of Queen Elizabeth II

=== The Crown and Honours ===
Within the Commonwealth realms, the monarch is the fount of honour. Similarly, the monarch, as Sovereign of Solomon Islands, confers awards and honours in Solomon Islands in his name. Most of them are often awarded on the advice of "His Majesty's Solomon Island Ministers".

In March 1981, Governor-General Sir Baddeley Devesi was authorised by Royal warrant to institute the regulation of an Order of Solomon Islands. The order is composed of three grades: the Star of Solomon Islands, the Cross of Solomon Islands, and the Solomon Islands Medal. In 1982, Queen Elizabeth II became the first recipient of the Star of Solomon Islands, and the same honour was conferred on King Charles III in 2024.

=== The Crown and the Police Force ===
The flag of the Royal Solomon Islands Police Force featuring St Edward's Crown

The Police Force of Solomon Islands is known as the "Royal Solomon Islands Police Force". Formerly the Solomon Islands Police Force, the force was granted the prefix "Royal" by Queen Elizabeth II in 1978.

The Crown sits at the pinnacle of the Royal Solomon Islands Police Force. Under the Police Act 2013, all officers in the Police Force have to swear allegiance to the monarch of Solomon Islands, before taking office. The current oath is:

"I, (name), Swear by Almighty God that I will well and truly serve His Majesty, King Charles the Third, King of Solomon Islands and will execute the powers and duties of my office honestly, faithfully and diligently without favour or affection, malice or ill-will towards any person and I will obey, uphold and maintain the laws of Solomon Islands. To the best of my power, I will seek and cause the peace to be preserved and will prevent all offences against the peace to the best of my skill and knowledge, and discharge all duties faithfully according to law."

St. Edward's Crown appears on the police force's badges and rank insignia, which illustrates the monarchy as the locus of authority.

=== Royal visits ===
Queen blong yumi and Duke blong Edinburgh telling me such a good memories blong time algeter visitin this islands.
(Pijin: Our Queen and the Duke of Edinburgh have told me they have such good memories of their time visiting these islands.)

— Charles, Prince of Wales, 2019

Members of the royal family have occasionally visited Solomon Islands. Prince Philip, Duke of Edinburgh visited the islands in 1959 and 1971. The Duke and Duchess of Kent visited in 1969.

Queen Elizabeth II first visited in 1974, with Prince Philip, Princess Anne, Captain Mark Phillips and Lord Mountbatten, during a tour of the area. In 1978, Prince Richard, Duke of Gloucester represented the Queen at the independence celebrations. The Queen and her husband visited the islands again in October 1982 after attending the Commonwealth Games in Australia.

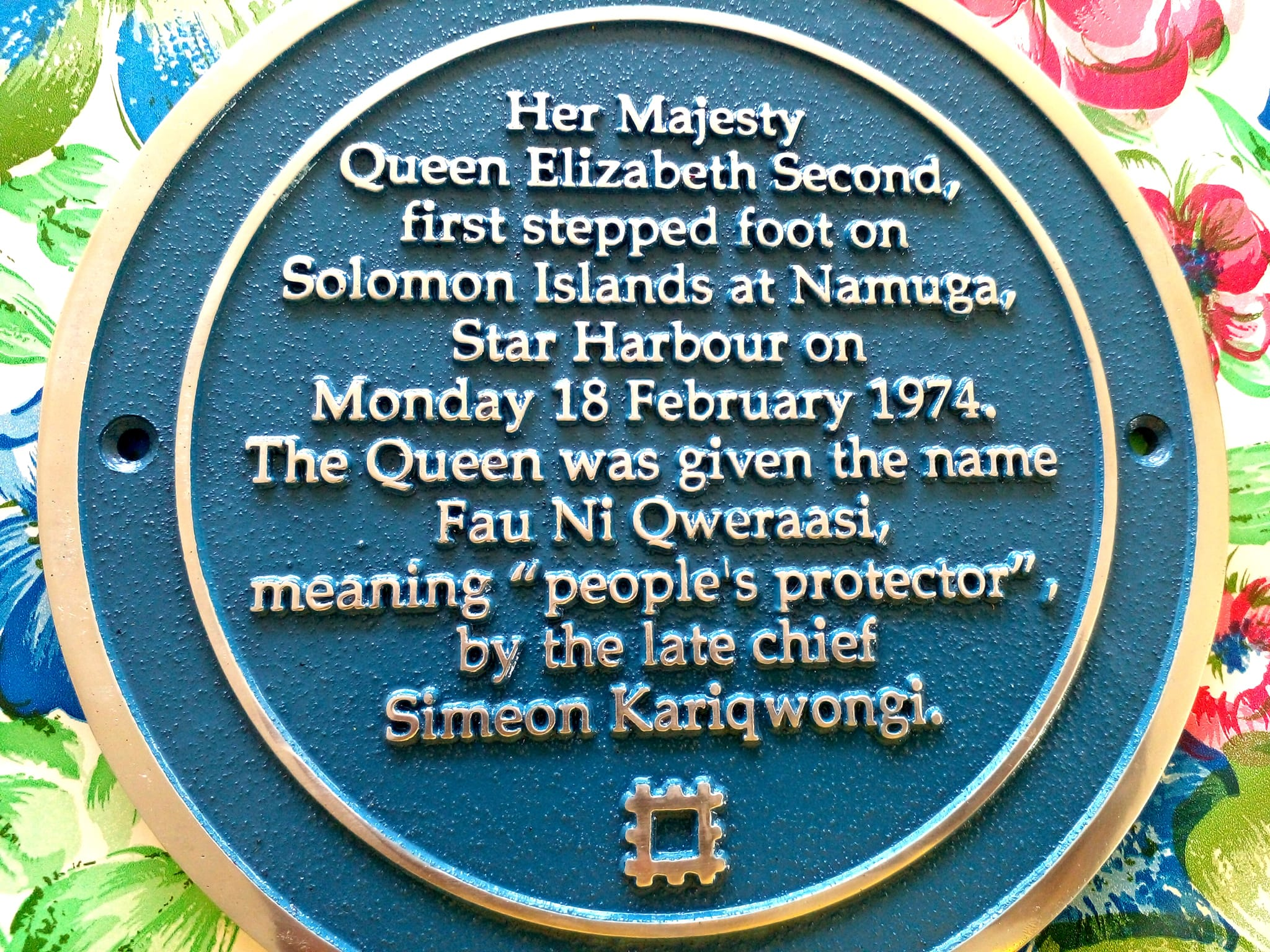
Plaque at Namuga in Star Harbour, marking Queen Elizabeth II's first visit to Solomon Islands in 1974

The Duke and Duchess of Gloucester visited the country in August 2008. They attended a parade in commemoration of the 30th Independence Anniversary, followed by an Ecumenical Church Service at the Saint Barnabas Anglican Cathedral Church. During their visit, the couple visited King George the Sixth School, the Guadalcanal Plains Palm Oil Limited (GPPOL), the National Referral hospital, the RAMSI Camp at the Guadalcanal Beach Resort and the American War Memorial in Skyline. The Duke also addressed the National Parliament to mark the end of the visit.

Prince William and Catherine, the Duke and Duchess of Cambridge, visited in September 2012 to mark the Queen's Diamond Jubilee. During the visit, the Duke and Duchess were treated to panpipes performances, traditional costumes and an idyllic island retreat. In a cultural village, the couple saw performances by people representing the nine provinces that make up the nation. In Honiara, the Duke and Duchess attended a memorial to the Coast Watchers. During the visit, the couple also travelled on a traditional war canoe between the islands of Marapa and Tavanipupu.

Charles, Prince of Wales visited the country in November 2019. During the visit, he attended a Service of Thanksgiving at Saint Barnabas' Anglican Cathedral, participated in a wreath-laying ceremony at the Solomon Islands Scouts and Coastwatchers' Memorial, and addressed the National Parliament.

== Proposed republic ==
At the time of independence, local councils associated with the former Maasina Ruru movement were said to favour retaining the monarchy, while a majority of the Legislative Assembly favoured becoming a republic.

At the 1980 general election, the Solomon Islands United Party led by Prime Minister Peter Kenilorea emerged as the largest party, running on a platform that included replacing the monarchy with an indigenous ceremonial presidency. Kenilorea was subsequently replaced as prime minister by his opponent Solomon Mamaloni, who favoured an executive presidency and appointed a committee to revise the constitution on those lines. However, Mamaloni was defeated at the 1984 election and the committee was dissolved.

In 1987, Prime Minister Ezekiel Alebua appointed a Constitutional Review Committee chaired by Mamaloni. The committee's report presented in 1988 again recommended abolition of the monarchy as part of a wider process of indigenisation, with only indigenous Solomon Islanders eligible to become president. The new president was to have greater powers than the governor-general, such as greater powers to dissolve parliament on their own initiative, but without a full executive presidency. Mamaloni was re-elected prime minister in 1989, but failed to bring about the committee's recommendations.

A further process of constitutional review was initiated in response to civil unrest which broke out in Solomon Islands in the late 1990s, with the Townsville Peace Agreement of 2000 requiring the government to establish a constitutional council. The Federal Constitution of Solomon Islands Bill 2004 produced by the process envisaged Solomon Islands becoming a federal republic. In 2007 the government established the Constitutional Congress, which produced further draft federal constitutions in 2009 and 2011; the latter provided for the country to be renamed the Democratic Federal Republic of Solomon Islands. A revised draft Constitution of the Republic of Solomon Islands was released by the Solomon Islands government in 2018.

In 2022, Prime Minister Manasseh Sogavare promised to enact the new federal constitution by 2026. Sogavare's government amended the constitution in 2023 to establish a process for repeal of the 1978 constitution, including the creation of a Constituent Assembly which would approve a final constitution based on the 2018 draft for a parliamentary vote.

A 2023 poll by Lord Ashcroft polling showed that 59% of those questioned in Solomon Islands supported a democratically elected head of state compared to 34% in favour of keeping the monarchy and 7% who did not know or would not vote.

== List of Solomon Island monarchs ==
Portrait	Regnal name (Birth–Death)	Reign over Solomon Islands		Full name	Consort	House
Portrait	Regnal name (Birth–Death)	Start	End	Full name	Consort	House
	Elizabeth II (1926–2022)	7 July 1978	8 September 2022	Elizabeth Alexandra Mary	Philip Mountbatten	Windsor
	Elizabeth II (1926–2022)	Governors-general: Sir Baddeley Devesi, Sir George Lepping, Sir Moses Pitakaka, Sir John Lapli, Sir Nathaniel Waena, Sir Frank Kabui, Sir David Vunagi; Prime ministers: Peter Kenilorea, Solomon Mamaloni, Ezekiel Alebua, Francis Billy Hilly, Bartholomew Ulufa'alu, Manasseh Sogavare, Allan Kemakeza, Snyder Rini, Derek Sikua, Danny Philip, Gordon Darcy Lilo, Rick Houenipwela				
	Charles III (born 1948)	8 September 2022	present	Charles Philip Arthur George	Camilla Shand	Windsor
	Charles III (born 1948)	Governors-general: Sir David Vunagi, Sir David Tiva Kapu; Prime ministers: Manasseh Sogavare, Jeremiah Manele				

== See also ==
- Lists of office-holders
- List of prime ministers of Elizabeth II
- List of prime ministers of Charles III
- List of Commonwealth visits made by Elizabeth II
- Monarchies in Oceania
- List of monarchies
