= Orders, decorations, and medals of the Solomon Islands =

The following is a list of Orders, decorations, and medals of the Solomon Islands throughout history.

== Order of Solomon Islands ==
The Order of Solomon Islands is the primary order of merit of the Solomon Islands. It comes in the following three grades:

- Star of Solomon Islands
- Cross of Solomon Islands
- Solomon Islands Medal

== Other Medals and Awards ==
- Solomon Islands Independence Medal
- Guadalcanal 50th Anniversary Medal
- Solomon Islands Medal
- Solomon Islands Meritorious Service Medal

== Military and Police ==
- Royal Solomon Islands Police Long Service and Good Conduct Medal
- Disciplined Forces 10th Anniversary Medal

== See also ==
- List of post-nominal letters (Solomon Islands)
