= Solomon Islands Christian Association =

The Solomon Islands Christian Association (SICA) is an ecumenical Christian non-governmental organisation in Solomon Islands. The association comprises the five largest Christian churches in the country, the Anglican Church of Melanesia, the Roman Catholic Church, the South Seas Evangelical Church, the Seventh-day Adventist Church, and the United Church.

SICA organises joint religious activities and religious representation at national events, and is a national partner of UNICEF. They also work with the Christian Reformed Church of Australia to support the missionary outreach of organisation SWIM Solomon Islands.

== History ==
In 1967 a meeting was convened of representatives from the various churches in Solomon Islands, including Philip Solodia, Dominic Otuana, Goldie Vengo, Isaac Goloni, Baddeley Devesi (later the country's first Governor-General), Peter Kenilorea (later the country's first Prime Minister), Bobi Kwanairara, Leslie Piva, and Leslie Fugui, in which a decision to form an association to encourage Christian love and fellowship. A combined church service was held at St. Barnabas Cathedral in Honiara to mark the agreement. The agreement, the result of native Solomon Islanders, was also supported by churchmen of foreign origin, such as Geoff Tucker, Eddie Nash, Brian Macdonald-Milne, and Louis Morosini. The organisation quickly spread beyond Honiara.

In 1978 SICA organised the Pijin Literacy Project, as an attempt to use Pijin as a medium for teaching literacy. The project produced a number of primers and translation work.

In August 2000, SICA organised a National Peace Conference as a reaction to the coup by the Malaita Eagle Force in June. They called for a respect of human rights and opposed blanket amnesty for armed groups involved in the conflict. The leader of the MEF expressed upset to the chairman of SICA, and according to Amnesty International was behind attacks or threats to participants in the conference. More recently, in 2005, SICA has urged a truth and reconciliation commission be organised before a human rights commission be set up.
