= Roger Tian-hung Luo =

Politician

Roger Luo
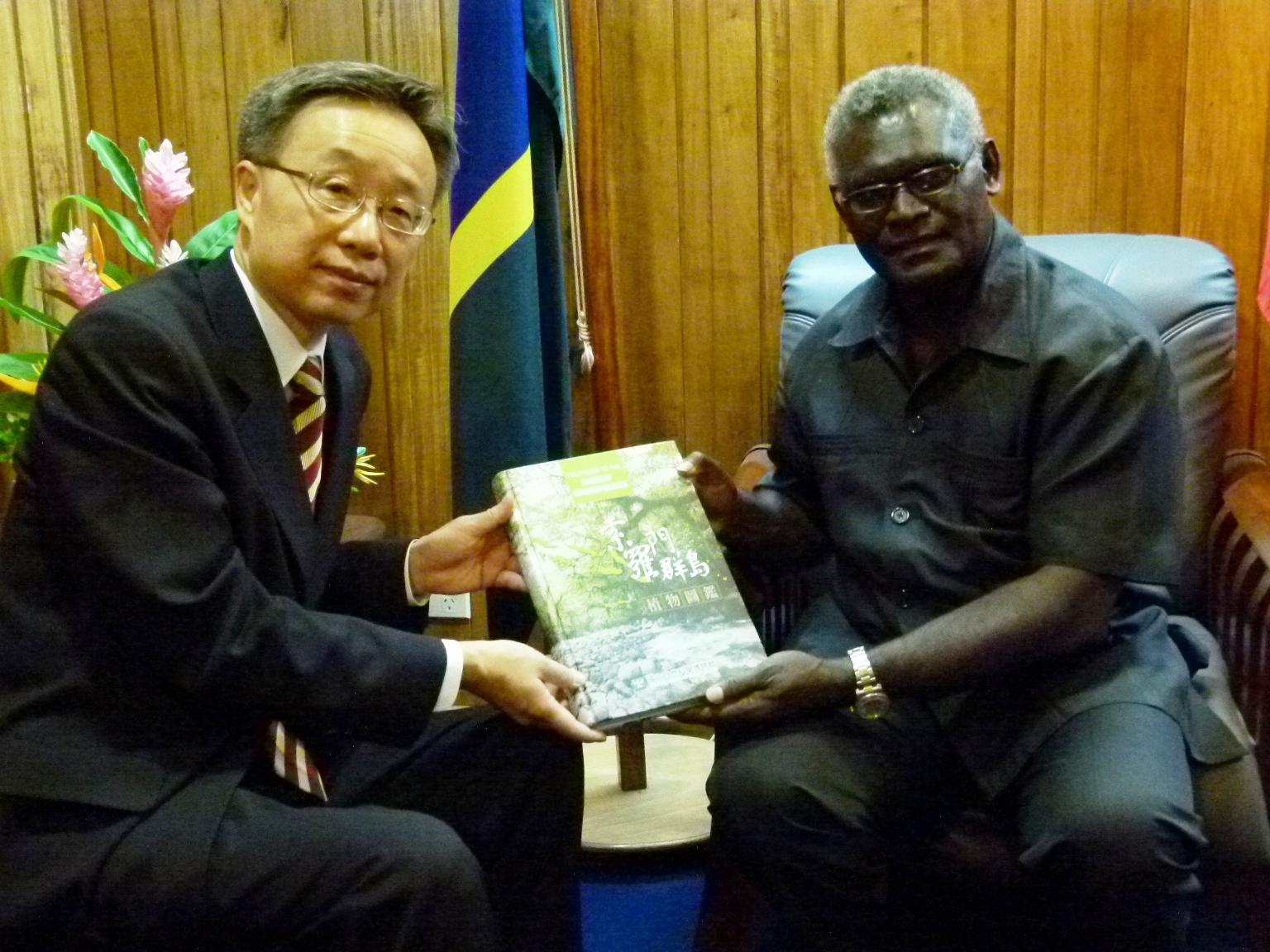
- Roger Luo (left) presents a Taiwanese-funded SI flora catalogue to Prime Minister Manasseh Sogavare in the final week of January 2017, in the Prime Minister's Office of the Solomon Islands.

Ambassador of the Republic of China (Taiwan) to Solomon Islands
- Preceded by: Victor Yu

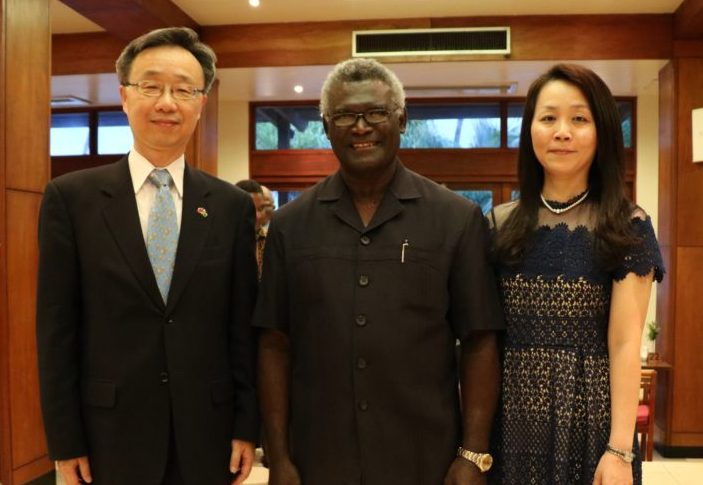
From left to right: Roger Luo, Prime Minister Manasseh Sogavare and Mrs Luo in early 2017.

Roger Tien-hung Luo (commonly referred to as Roger Luo, traditional Chinese: 羅添宏; simplified Chinese: 罗添宏) is a Taiwanese diplomat. He served as Taiwanese ambassador to the Solomon Islands between 2017 and 2019 and was preceded by Victor Yu.

== Biography ==
After Luo successfully completed the special examination for diplomats in 1983, he joined the Ministry of Foreign Affairs. He had posts in the Philippines, Swaziland, and St. Vincent. He met Hsing Yun, the founder of Buddha's Light International Association, in 1999. Luo was based in Busan in South Korea for six years during which he shared over 1,000 photos and 360 travel stories on his blog "Having More Fun in Korea Than Koreans" (Chinese: 比韓國人還會玩韓國). He was the deputy director of the Bureau of Consular Affairs in 2014.

Luo was appointed the Taiwanese ambassador to the Solomon Islands, a position he served in between January 2017 to August 2019. His wife joined him when Frank Kabui, the Governor-General of Solomon Islands, received his diplomatic credentials. While stationed at various locations, he took part in numerous commemorative events related to war and viewed military antiques. He authored the book My Time in Solomon Islands: World War II Battleground through the eyes of an Ambassador (Chinese: 我在索羅門群島：台灣大使的美日戰場見聞錄), which was published in 2021. In a book review, Citi Cui of the China Times wrote, "After the author's careful study and on-the-spot observation, this book is easy to read, allowing readers to quickly understand the combat history of the United States and Japan in the Solomon Islands during World War II."
