= Royal Style and Titles Act 2013 =

National Parliament of Solomon Islands
- Long title: An Act to Provide for the Form of the Royal Style And Titles in Accordance with the Constitutional Position of Solomon Islands.
- Territorial extent: Solomon Islands
- Passed by: National Parliament of Solomon Islands
- Passed: 1 August 2013
- Royal assent: 10 October 2013
- Commenced: 1 November 2013
- Bill citation: No. 7 of 2013
- Status: In force

The Royal Style and Titles Act 2013 is an act of the National Parliament of Solomon Islands which altered the monarch's title in Solomon Islands.

The bill was assented by Governor-General Sir Frank Kabui on 10 October 2013 and commenced on 1 November 2013.

== Background ==
At the 1952 Commonwealth Prime Ministers' Economic Conference, Commonwealth prime ministers, after months of discussion on whether the newly ascended Queen Elizabeth II should have a uniform Royal Styles and Titles throughout the Commonwealth or whether realms should adopt their own styles and titles, it was agreed that each member of the Commonwealth "should use for its own purposes a form of the Royal Style and Titles which suits its own particular circumstances but retains a substantial element which is common to all". It was decided that the monarch's title in all her realms have, as their common element the description of the Sovereign as "Queen of Her Realms and Territories and Head of the Commonwealth". The prime ministers agreed to pass appropriate legislation in their respective parliaments.

After independence in 1978, Solomon Islands became an independent constitutional monarchy within the Commonwealth. A bill to alter the monarch's title in relation to Solomon Islands was introduced in 2013.

== Legislation ==
The bill to alter the monarch's style was introduced in 2013. The bill was passed by the Parliament on 1 August 2013, and received royal assent from the Governor-General on 10 October 2013.

The Act formally changed the Queen's title in Solomon Islands to:

Elizabeth the Second, by the Grace of God, Queen of Solomon Islands and Her other Realms and Territories, Head of the Commonwealth

This style was already in non-statutory use since 1988, when it was included in the Ministry of Foreign Affairs and External Trade Manual.

== Commencement ==
Under the provisions of the Act, it commenced on the date of publication in the Solomon Islands Gazette on 1 November 2013.

== See also ==
- Monarchy of Solomon Islands
- Governor-General of Solomon Islands
- Royal Style and Titles Act
