= Constitution of Solomon Islands =

The Constitution of Solomon Islands is the supreme law of Solomon Islands. It was approved on 31 May 1978 and entered into force on 7 July 1978 at the point of independence from the United Kingdom. It has been amended on a number of occasions; most sections can be amended by two-thirds majority of the National Parliament, but some provisions are entrenched and require three-quarters to amend.

== Drafting and adoption ==
The original draft constitution passed by the Legislative Assembly in March 1977 provided for Solomon Islands become a republic one year after independence, unless a two-thirds majority in the national parliament voted to retain the monarchy. Following the transitional period, the governor-general at the time would then become the inaugural president of the new republic. British officials opposed this formula on the grounds that it was too complicated and that Solomon Islands should make a final choice as to become a monarchy or republic upon independence. Negotiations in London in September 1977 between Solomons leaders and the British government eventually produced a final draft constitution which omitted references to a republic.

== Provisions ==
The constitution establishes Solomon Islands as a unitary state under a constitutional monarchy based on the principles of the Westminster system. Section 35 of the constitution provides for responsible government, with the national cabinet "collectively responsible to parliament". The preamble to the constitution commits Solomon Islands to "democratic principles of universal suffrage and declares that:

All power in Solomon Islands belongs to its people and is exercised on their behalf by the legislature, the executive and the judiciary established by this Constitution.

Section 114 of the constitution requires the National Parliament to "consider the role of traditional chiefs in the provinces". However, conflict between traditional law and society has been a long-standing source of tension in Solomon Islands politics. The constitution also provides for customary law to be recognised, but makes no prescription for conflict between customary law and other sources of law.

== Constitutional reform ==
=== Early proposals ===
The 1978 constitution adopted on independence was widely seen as a transitional document. At the 1980 general election, the Solomon Islands United Party led by Prime Minister Peter Kenilorea emerged as the largest party in the National Parliament, running on a platform that included replacing the monarchy with an indigenous ceremonial presidency. Kenilorea was subsequently replaced as prime minister by his opponent Solomon Mamaloni, who favoured an executive presidency and appointed a committee to revise the constitution on those lines. However, Mamaloni was defeated at the 1984 election and the committee was dissolved.

In 1987, Prime Minister Ezekiel Alebua appointed a Constitutional Review Committee, chaired by his predecessor Solomon Mamaloni. The committee's report presented in 1988 again recommended abolition of the monarchy as part of a wider process of indigenisation, with only indigenous Solomon Islanders eligible to become president. The new president was to have greater powers than the governor-general, such as greater powers to dissolve parliament on their own initiative, but without a full executive presidency. Mamaloni was re-elected prime minister in 1989, but failed to bring about the committee's recommendations.

=== 21st century ===
A further process of constitutional review was initiated in response to civil unrest which broke out in Solomon Islands in the late 1990s, with the Townsville Peace Agreement of 2000 requiring the government to establish a constitutional council. The Federal Constitution of Solomon Islands Bill 2004 produced by the process envisaged Solomon Islands becoming a federal republic. In 2007 the government established the Constitutional Congress, which produced further draft federal constitutions in 2009 and 2011; the latter provided for the country to be renamed the Democratic Federal Republic of Solomon Islands. A further revised draft Constitution of the Republic of Solomon Islands was released by the Solomon Islands government in 2018.

In 2022, Prime Minister Manasseh Sogavare promised to enact the new federal constitution by 2026, following pressure from Guadalcanal provincial leaders. Sogavare's government amended the constitution in 2023 to establish a process for the repeal of the 1978 constitution, including the creation of a Constituent Assembly which would approve a final constitution based on the 2018 draft for a parliamentary vote.
