= Diocese of Temotu =

Coordinates: 10°45′S 167°0′E

The Diocese of Temotu is one of the ten dioceses within the Anglican Church of Melanesia. Established in 1981, it has contributed three of its six bishops to the role of archbishop of the province.

The diocese encompasses Temotu Province, the easternmost province of the Solomon Islands, previously known as Santa Cruz Islands Province. The province includes the remote islands of Anuta and Tikopia.

== List of bishops ==
Bishops of Temotu
From	Until	Incumbent	Notes
1981	1987	Amos Waiaru	First bishop; became Archbishop of Melanesia in 1988.
1987	?	Lazarus Munamua	Second bishop; consecrated and installed on 20 September 1987.
1999	2009	David Vunagi	Third bishop; became Archbishop of Melanesia in 2009.
?	2016	George Takeli	Fourth bishop; became Archbishop of Melanesia in 2016.
2016	2019	Leonard Dawea	Fifth bishop; became Archbishop
2020	present	Willie Tungale	Sixth bishop; consecrated and installed on 16 February 2020.
