= Kabui (surname) =

Kabui is a surname. Notable people with the surname include:

- Frank Kabui (born 1946), Solomon Islands politician
- Joseph Kabui (1954–2008), Bougainville secessionist leader
