= List of post-nominal letters (Solomon Islands) =

Post-nominal letters in the Solomon Islands include:

Office	Post-nominal
Star of the Solomon Islands	SSI
Cross of Solomon Islands	CSI
Solomon Islands Medal	SIM

== See also ==
- Lists of post-nominal letters
