= Lazarus Munamua =

Lazarus Munamua was the second Bishop of Temotu (1987-1998), one of the nine dioceses that make up the Anglican Church of Melanesia.
