= Diocese of Central Solomons =

Location
- Country: Solomon Islands
- Ecclesiastical province: Anglican Church of Melanesia
- Coordinates: 9°06′S 160°09′E

Statistics
- Population: Total: 17,700

Information
- Established: 4 May 1997
- Cathedral: Christ the King Cathedral, Tulagi

The Diocese of Central Solomons is one of the ten current dioceses of the Anglican Church of Melanesia.

The diocese was inaugurated on 4 May 1997, erected from part of the Diocese of Central Melanesia. The cathedral was and remains Christ the King Cathedral, Tulagi. The Central Solomons diocese was divided on 23 June 2013, in order to erect the new Diocese of Guadalcanal by decision of the Anglican Church of Melanesia General Synod; Rennell and Bellona moved to the new diocese while the Nggela and Savo remained. Following that division, the population covered by the Diocese of Central Solomons was around to 17,700.

== List of bishops ==
Bishops of Central Solomons
From	Until	Incumbent	Notes
1997	2010	Charles Koete	First bishop; consecrated and installed at the inauguration of the Diocese on 4 May 1997; retired in 2010.
2011	2021	Ben Seka	Second bishop; consecrated and installed 20 February 2011. Retired 1 December 2021.
2022	present	Steven Koete	Third bishop; elected 24 November 2021; consecrated and installed on 1 May 2022.

== Sources ==
- Anglican Church of Melanesia — Diocese of Central Solomons
