= David Tiva Kapu =

Governor-General of Solomon Islands since 2024

His Excellency The Reverend Sir David Tiva Kapu GCMG
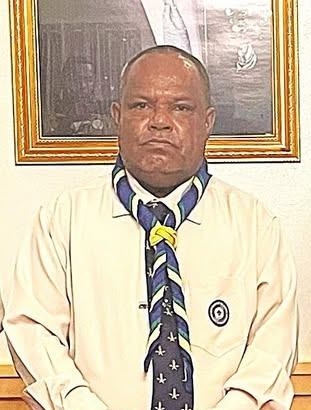
- Kapu in 2025

Governor-General of Solomon Islands
- Incumbent
- Assumed office 7 July 2024
- Monarch: Charles III
- Prime Minister: Jeremiah Manele; Matthew Wale
- Preceded by: Sir David Vunagi

Personal details
- Born: British Solomon Islands Protectorate

Sir David Tiva Kapu, GCMG is a Solomon Islands Anglican priest and the governor-general of Solomon Islands since 2024.

== Education ==
Kapu received his Master of Theology degree from the Pacific Theological College. His thesis titled, "What has the Church to do with the State?" analyzed the role of church and state relationship in Nggela Islands, Solomon Islands from 1932 to 2007.

== Career ==
Reverend Kapu has served as the academic dean of studies Bishop Patteson Theological College at Kohimarama, in Solomon Islands.

In June 2024, he was the sole candidate put forward for nomination as the next Governor-General of Solomon Islands, the monarch's viceregal representative in the country. He was formally nominated as governor-general on 17 June 2024. A Royal Commission to appoint Kapu as Governor General was issued by King Charles III on June 27, 2024, which came into effect on 7 July 2024 following the expiry of Sir David Vunagi's term.

Kapu was appointed a Knight Grand Cross of the Order of St Michael and St George (GCMG) on 1 October 2024, and was invested as such by King Charles III during an audience at Buckingham Palace on 25 February 2025.

Government offices
Preceded by Sir David Vunagi	Governor-General of Solomon Islands; 2024–present	Incumbent
