= Ranjit Hewagama =

Sri Lankan lawyer (born 1942)

Asoka Nihal Ranjit Hewagama (born 22 July 1942) is a Sri Lankan lawyer, who served as the Solomon Islands' legal draftsman for 23 years, the Solicitor-General and the president of the Solomon Islands Bar Association.

== Career ==
Hewagama began his career as an assistant legal draftsman in his native Sri Lanka, serving from 1972 to 1975. He then served as assistant parliamentary counsel and then parliamentary counsel in Jamaica from 1975 to 1985. The Commonwealth Secretariat later recommended him for a position in the Solomon Islands, and he arrived there in 1985. After his first two years, then-Attorney-General Frank Kabui asked him to stay on for another few years, and then extended his contract again, and then hired him in a permanent role.

In early 2006, Hewagama wrote an article in the Solomon Star warning Solomon Islanders to be wary of donors who lobbied for changes in existing laws, describing them as seeking to "undermine" the legal system. In June 2007, police raided Hewagama's office and removed documents; Hewagama's lawyer stated that the police did not have a warrant for the confiscated items and that they were privileged documents as well. Upon an injunction filed by Hewagama's lawyer, the High Court ordered the documents returned. A hearing the next morning was delayed when no legal representative for the police attended court; a call to the Director of Public Prosecutions Ronald Bei Talasasa revealed that the police were unaware of the proceedings, and he promised to send a representative to the High Court forthwith. However, the hearing was delayed.

In July 2007, Hewagama was removed from his position as legal draftsman, reportedly at the instigation of PM Manasseh Sogavare. The official reason given was dissatisfaction with his performance of his duties. The Cabinet was not consulted before the PM ordered the Public Service Department to terminate Hewagama. At the time, Hewagama indicated that he would file a court challenge to his termination, though by two weeks later he had not done so. Instead, he returned to his native Sri Lanka after that; Frank Kabui was elected to head the Solomon Islands Bar Association in his place. He is now a consultant in intellectual property law at Omar and Associates in Colombo.

== Personal life ==
Hewagama obtained his LL.B. at the University of Ceylon in 1969, and was admitted and enrolled as an advocate of the Supreme Court of Ceylon in 1971. He is an executive committee member of the Solomon Islands Tennis Federation, despite his departure reportedly most recently reappointed in 2010. He has a wife and son. Despite his long years in the Solomon Islands, he never naturalised as a citizen there.

== Works ==
- Hewagama, Ranjit, ed. (1997). The revised laws of the Solomon Islands. Eyre and Spottiswoode. OCLC 745008320.
- Hewagama, Ranjit (2010). "The challenges of legislative drafting in small Commonwealth jurisdictions". Commonwealth Law Bulletin. 36 (1): 117–123. doi:10.1080/03050710903573514.
