= David Vunagi =

Anglican archbishop and viceregal (1951–2025)

The Most Reverend Sir David Vunagi GCMG
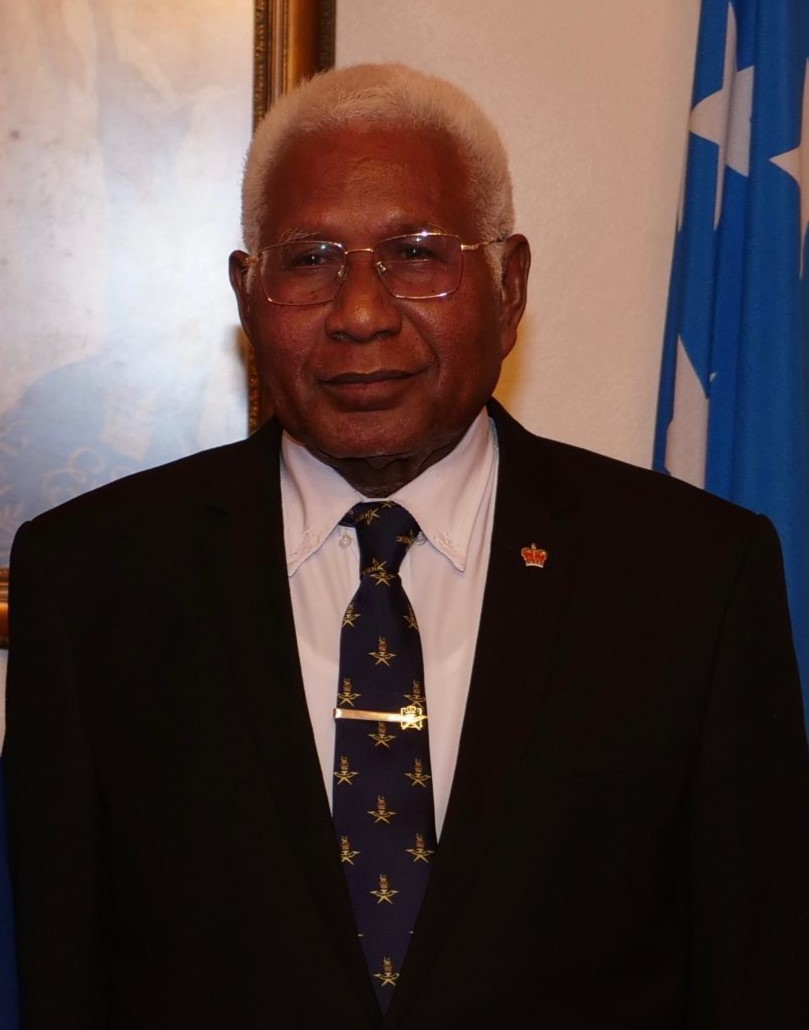
- Vunagi in 2020

7th Governor-General of Solomon Islands
- In office 7 July 2019 – 7 July 2024
- Monarchs: Elizabeth II; Charles III
- Prime Minister: Manasseh Sogavare; Jeremiah Manele
- Preceded by: Sir Frank Kabui
- Succeeded by: David Tiva Kapu

Archbishop of Melanesia Bishop of Central Melanesia
- In office 2009–2017
- Preceded by: Sir Ellison Pogo
- Succeeded by: George Takeli

Personal details
- Born: 5 September 1950 Samasodu, Santa Isabel Island, British Solomon Islands (present-day Solomon Islands)
- Died: 7 March 2025 (aged 74) Okea, Guadalcanal, Solomon Islands
- Spouse: Mary Tuti
- Children: Dudley, Rusila and Douglas
- Education: University of the South Pacific (GrDip); St John's College, Auckland (BT); University of Papua New Guinea (MB); Vancouver School of Theology (MT)

Sir David Okete Vuvuiri Vunagi GCMG (5 September 1950 – 7 March 2025) was a Solomon Islands Anglican bishop who served as governor-general of Solomon Islands from 2019 to 2024. He was the archbishop of Melanesia and bishop of the Diocese of Central Melanesia from 2009 to 2015.

== Early life and education ==
Vunagi was born on 5 September 1950 in Samasodu, on Santa Isabel Island (Isabel Province), in what was then the British Solomon Islands Protectorate. He studied at KGVI Secondary School, from 1968 to 1973. He achieved a Diploma of Education in Science at the University of the South Pacific in 1976, and a M.B. of Education in Biology at the University of Papua New Guinea in 1982. Before serving as a priest, he was a teacher at the government school at KGVI and at the Selwyn College of the Church of Melanesia. Vunagi earned a Bachelor of Theology at St John's College, Auckland, in 1990. He earned a Master of Theology at the Vancouver School of Theology in 1998.

== Career ==
Vunagi was a teacher at the Bishop Patteson Theological College Kohimarama, in Solomon Islands, in 1992.

Vunagi later moved to Canada, where he was assistant priest at St. Anselm's Parish in the Diocese of New Westminster, British Columbia, from 1996 to 1998.

He returned afterwards to the Solomon Islands, where he was a priest in the Diocese of Ysabel. In 1999, he went back to teaching at the Selwyn College, where he was principal. He became Mission Secretary at the Provincial Headquarters of the Church of Melanesia, in 2000. Vunagi was elected the same year Bishop of the Diocese of Temotu, which he was until 2009. He was consecrated as a bishop and installed as the third Bishop of Temotu on 6 May 2001.

Vunagi was elected the 5th Archbishop and Primate of the Church of the Province of Melanesia on 4 March 2009, in a Provincial electoral board, held in Honiara, being enthroned on 31 May 2009.

He attended the Global South Fourth Encounter, in Singapore, from 19–23 April 2010, and was also represented at the Global South Conference that took place in Bangkok, from 18–20 July 2012.

Archbishop Vunagi left office on 6 September 2015, in a ceremony that took place at St. Barnabas Cathedral, in Honiara, attended by the nine bishops of the Anglican Church of Melanesia. He was succeeded as acting Primate by Nathan Tome, Bishop of Guadalcanal, the senior bishop of the province, until the election of the new Primate on 12 February 2016.

In June 2019, he was the sole candidate to become the next Governor-General of Solomon Islands, the monarch's viceregal representative in the country, and officially took office on 7 July 2019 (Independence Day). He served a five-year term.

== Personal life and death ==
Vunagi was married to Mary Vunagi, the second child of Bishop Dudley Tuti, and had three children.

Following an illness, Vunagi died at his home in Okea, Guadalcanal, on 7 March 2025, at the age of 74.

Government offices
Preceded by Sir Frank Kabui	Governor-General of Solomon Islands; 2019–2024	Succeeded by Sir David Tiva Kapu
Anglican Communion titles
Preceded by Ellison Pogo	Archbishop of Melanesia; 2009–2017	Succeeded by George Takeli
