= George Lepping =

Governor-General of Solomon Islands from 1988 to 1994

Sir George Lepping GCMG MBE
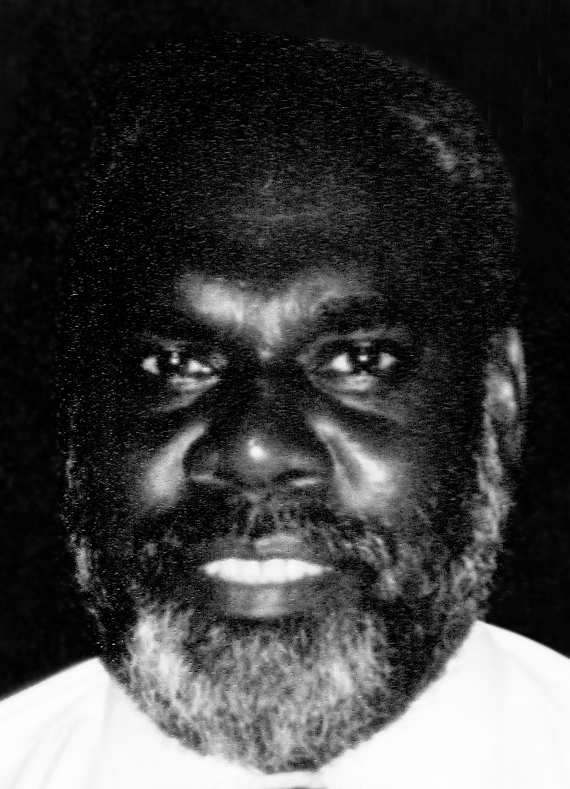
- George Lepping at Hibiscus Hotel (later: King Solomon Hotel) in Honiara (June 1993), for the closure of Youth Challenge International's Project Solomon Islands 1993.

2nd Governor General of Solomon Islands
- In office 7 July 1988 – 7 July 1994
- Monarch: Elizabeth II
- Prime Minister: Ezekiel Alebua; Solomon Mamaloni; Sir Francis Billy Hilly
- Preceded by: Sir Baddeley Devesi
- Succeeded by: Sir Moses Pitakaka

Personal details
- Born: 22 November 1947 Shortland Islands, British Solomon Islands
- Died: 24 December 2014 (aged 67) Honiara, Solomon Islands
- Spouse(s): Margaret, Lady Lepping
- Children: 6

Sir George Gerea Dennis Lepping, GCMG MBE (22 November 1947 – 24 December 2014) served as the second Governor-General of the Solomon Islands from 7 July 1988 to 7 July 1994. Lepping was a native of the Shortland Islands of Western Province.

== Biography ==
Lepping was appointed a Member of the Order of the British Empire in the 1981 New Year Honours for contribution to "public service and sport.

He was appointed Knight Grand Cross of the Order of St Michael and St George (GCMG) in 1988.

In March 2010, Sir George was appointed the Chairman of the 2012 Festival Pacific Arts Organising Committee.

Up until his death, he was a chairman of the Eminent Persons Advisory Council (EPAC) of the Solomon Islands Government's Constitutional Reform Unit.

He died at his residence in Honiara, was a Catholic and, in honour of him, a state funeral was held at the Holy Cross Cathedral in Honiara. He was laid to rest on his home island in the Shortland Islands.

Preceded by Sir Baddeley Devesi	Governor-General of the Solomon Islands; 1988–1994	Succeeded by Sir Moses Pitakaka
