= George Takeli =

Solomon Islands Anglican bishop

The Most Reverend George Takeli
- Archbishop of Melanesia; Bishop of Central Melanesia
- Church: Church of the Province of Melanesia
- In office: 2016–2019
- Predecessor: David Vunagi
- Successor: Leonard Dawea
- Previous post: Bishop of Temotu

Orders
- Consecration: 1985

Personal details
- Born: 1959 (age 66–67) Suholo village on Ulawa Island, in the province of Makira Ulawa

George Angus Takeli (born 1959) is a Solomon Islands Anglican bishop. He was Archbishop and Primate of the Anglican Church of Melanesia and Bishop of the Diocese of Central Melanesia from April 2016 to May 2019. He was first married to Lilian, who died in 2014. He got married a second time to June in December 2015.

== Ecclesiastical career ==
He was ordained an Anglican priest in 1995. He was undertaking a D.D. in Theology at Charles Stuart University in Australia, when he was elected the fourth bishop of the Diocese of Temotu in August 2009. He also has a M.D. in Theology from the University of Auckland in New Zealand.

He was elected the sixth Archbishop and Primate of Melanesia, in Honiara, on 12 February 2016. He was enthroned at St. Barnabas Provincial Cathedral, in Honiara, on 17 April 2016. Takeli retired in May 2019 and was succeeded that fall by Leonard Dawea.
