= Leonard Dawea =

Anglican Archbishop of Melanesia

The Most Reverend Leonard Dawea
- Archbishop of Melanesia; Bishop of Central Melanesia
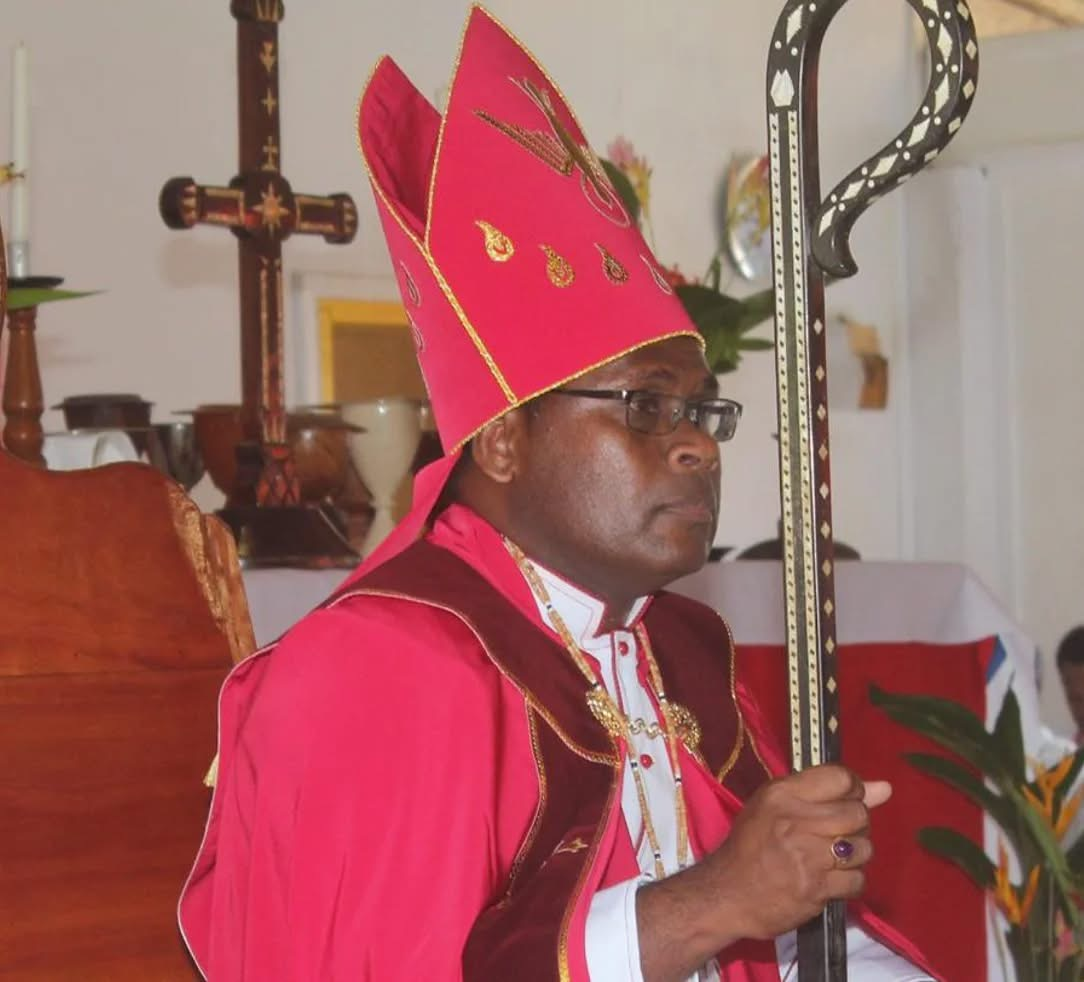
- Church: Church of the Province of Melanesia
- In office: 2019–present
- Predecessor: George Takeli
- Previous post: Bishop of Temotu

Orders
- Ordination: 2007
- Consecration: 11 September 2016 by George Takeli

Personal details
- Born: 1971 or 1972 (age 54–55)

Leonard Dawea is the current archbishop of The Anglican Church of Melanesia, he was installed as Archbishop on 15 September 2019.

He was also from his consecration on 11 September 2016 the fifth Bishop of Temotu, one of the nine dioceses that make up the Anglican Church of Melanesia.
