= Diocese of Guadalcanal =

Coordinates: 09°25′S 159°57′E

The Diocese of Guadalcanal is one of the ten current dioceses of the Anglican Church of Melanesia. It was founded on 23 June 2013.

The diocese was erected from the Diocese of Central Solomons and inaugurated at St Paul's Chapel, Legalau village, Tasiboko; it covers an area from beyond Lunga Bridge on the east and to beyond White River Bridge on the west of Honiara. St Paul's Chapel has become the diocesan cathedral.

== List of bishops ==
Bishops of Guadalcanal
From	Until	Incumbent	Notes
2013	2020	Nathan Tome	First bishop; elected 6 September 2013; translated from Banks and Torres; acting primate 2015–2016. Retired 20 September 2020.
2021	present	Benedict Loe	Elected 14 November 2020; consecrated and installed 28 February 2021.

== Sources ==
- Anglican Church of Melanesia — Diocese of Guadalcanal
