= Diocese of Banks and Torres =

Coordinates: 13°50′S 167°35′E

The Diocese of Banks and Torres is one of the ten current dioceses of the Anglican Church of Melanesia.

The Banks Islands are a group of islands in northern Vanuatu. Together with the Torres Islands to the northwest, they make up the northernmost province of Torba.

Founded on 12 May 1996 and currently made up of thirteen islands, divided into three regions and sixteen districts (parishes), the diocese was the first from which indigenous Melanesians were ordained into the priesthood. Veverao, on Mota, was the first Christian village established, and the Mota language was used by the first Christian missions to Melanesia. The Mass was first celebrated there by John Patteson.

== List of bishops ==
Bishops of Banks and Torres
| From | Until | Incumbent | Notes |
|---|---|---|---|
| 1996 | 2000 | Charles Ling | First bishop; consecrated and installed at the inauguration of the Diocese on 12 May 1996. |
| 2001 | 2013 | Nathan Tome | Second bishop; consecrated and installed on 24 May 2001; elected first Bishop of Guadalcanal after the diocese was split. |
| 2014 | present | Patterson Worek | Third bishop; consecrated 2 March 2014. |

== Sources ==
- Anglican Church of Melanesia — Diocese of Banks and Torries
