= Charles Koete =

Anglican Bishop of Central Solomons

Charles Koete (died 1 October 2012) was the inaugural Anglican Bishop of Central Solomons, one of the nine dioceses that make up the Anglican Church of Melanesia. He served from 1997 to 2011.

He was succeeded by Ben Seka.
