= Patterson Worek =

Anglican bishop in the Solomon Islands

Alfred Patterson Worek(born 1966 or 1965) was the third bishop of Bishop of Banks and Torres: he was consecrated on 2 March 2014.

He graduated with a Bachelor in Theology from the University of Auckland, New Zealand in 1998.

== Biography ==
He was ordained as a priest in 2000 and has served in various districts in the Diocese of Banks and Torres. His last posting before 2013 was as the Mission Secretary of the Anglican Church of Melanesia Board of Mission, based at the Provincial Head Office in Honiara. He left the post at the end of 2012 to undertake his post graduate studies in Fiji.

== Personal life ==
He is married to Annette Nerry Worek and they have five children.
