= Nathaniel Waena =

5th Governor-General of Solomon Islands (1945–2026)

The Honourable Sir Nathaniel Waena GCMG KStJ CSI
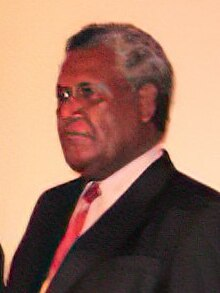
- Waena in 2006

5th Governor-General of Solomon Islands
- In office 7 July 2004 – 7 July 2009
- Monarch: Elizabeth II
- Prime Minister: Allan Kemakeza; Snyder Rini; Manasseh Sogavare; Derek Sikua
- Preceded by: John Lapli
- Succeeded by: Frank Kabui

Personal details
- Born: Nathaniel Rahumaea Waena; 1 November 1945 Su'utaluhia, Ulawa, British Solomon Islands
- Died: 19 September 2026 (aged 80)

Sir Nathaniel Rahumaea Waena (1 November 1945 – 19 September 2026) was a Solomon Islands diplomat who served as governor-general of the Solomon Islands from 2004 to 2009.

Waena was a member of the National Parliament for Ulawa-Ugi constituency in the Makira-Ulawa Province from 1984 to 2004. He served as Deputy Speaker of Parliament before becoming Assistant Prime Minister and Minister of Provincial Government in 2000, and afterwards he became Minister for National Unity, Peace and Reconciliation.

He was elected as governor-general by the National Parliament on 15 June 2004. He received 27 of 41 votes compared to 6 for incumbent Sir John Lapli and 8 for former prime minister Sir Peter Kenilorea.

Waena was appointed a Knight Grand Cross of the Order of St Michael and St George (GCMG) in the 2005 New Year Honours, soon after assuming office. He was appointed as a Knight of Grace of the Order of St John (KStJ) in May 2005, and later awarded the Cross of Solomon Islands (CSI).

On 15 June 2009, Frank Kabui was elected to succeed Waena as governor-general. In the fourth round of voting, in which Kabui was elected with 30 votes, Waena received 7 votes, placing third.

Waena died on 19 September 2026 at the age of 80.

Government offices
| Preceded by John Lapli | Governor-General of Solomon Islands; 2004–2009 | Succeeded by Frank Kabui |
