= Charles Ling (bishop) =

Bishop of Banks and Torres

Charles Welchman Ling was the inaugural Bishop of Banks and Torres.

Ling was educated at St Peter's College, Siota. After his ordination to the diaconate in 1968, and to the priesthood in 1969, Ling worked in the Solomon Islands, the New Hebrides and Vanuatu.

Ling died on his home island of Mota Lava in 2018.
