= Ben Seka =

Ben Seka was the Anglican Bishop of Central Solomons, one of the nine dioceses that make up the Anglican Church of Melanesia, from 2011 2021.

He succeeded Charles Koete, the first bishop of Central Solomons.

He was succeeded by Stephen Koete who is the current bishop in 2025. Koete was consecrated and installed on 1 May 2022.
