= Victor Yu (diplomat) =

Taiwanese politician

- Chinese: 于德勝

Ambassadors of the Republic of China to Solomon Islands
- Succeeded by: Roger Tian-hung Luo

Victor Yu (Chinese: 于德勝; pinyin: Yú Dé Shèng), sometimes transliterated Victor Te-Sun Yu, was ambassador of the Republic of China (Taiwan) to Solomon Islands until January 2017. He was succeeded by Roger Tian-hung Luo.
