= John Lapli =

Governor-General of Solomon Islands from 1999 to 2004

The Honourable Sir John Lapli GCMG
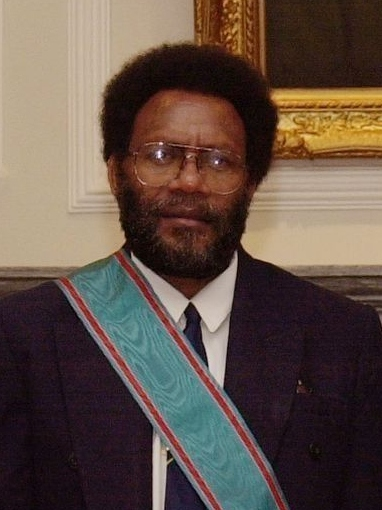
- Lapli in 2002

4th Governor-General of the Solomon Islands
- In office 7 July 1999 – 7 July 2004
- Monarch: Elizabeth II
- Prime Minister: Bartholomew Ulufa'alu; Manasseh Sogavare; Allan Kemakeza
- Preceded by: Sir Moses Pitakaka
- Succeeded by: Sir Nathaniel Waena

Personal details
- Born: 12 June 1955
- Died: 18 January 2025 (aged 69)
- Education: Selwyn College, Guadalcanal; St John's College, Auckland

Sir John Ini Lapli, GCMG (12 June 1955 – 18 January 2025) was a Governor-General of the Solomon Islands, serving from 7 July 1999 until 7 July 2004.

== Life and career ==
Lapli was born in 1955. Prior to his election as Governor-General in June 1999, Lapli was Premier of Temotu Province. He was taken hostage by rebels in 2000, but released after a few days, when the Prime Minister and his government promised to resign. In June 2004 Lapli failed to be re-elected to the position of Governor-General for another five-year term, receiving only 6 of the 41 votes in Parliament. Lapli died on 18 January 2025.

Preceded by Sir Moses Pitakaka	Governor-General of the Solomon Islands; 1999–2004	Succeeded by Sir Nathaniel Waena
