= Frank Kabui =

Governor-General of Solomon Islands from 2009 to 2019

Sir Frank Kabui GCMG CSI OBE KStJ
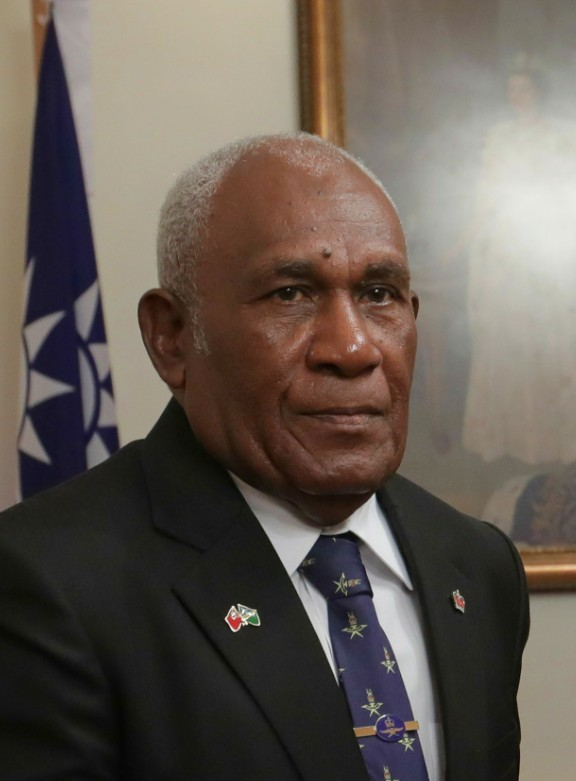
- Kabui in 2017

Governor General of Solomon Islands
- In office 7 July 2009 – 7 July 2019
- Monarch: Elizabeth II
- Prime Minister: Derek Sikua; Danny Philip; Gordon Darcy Lilo; Manasseh Sogavare; Rick Houenipwela
- Preceded by: Sir Nathaniel Waena
- Succeeded by: Sir David Vunagi

Personal details
- Born: 20 April 1946 (age 80) Suluagwari, Malaita, British Solomon Islands (now Solomon Islands)
- Spouse: Grace Kabui
- Education: University of Papua New Guinea

Sir Frank Utu Ofagioro Kabui, GCMG, CSI, OBE, KStJ (born 20 April 1946) is a former diplomat who was the Governor-General of Solomon Islands from 7 July 2009 to 7 July 2019.

He was the country's first law graduate in 1975, became a judge and was a former member of the Solomon Islands Bar Association (SIBA), having twice served as its president.

== Career ==
=== Background and legal career ===
Kabui was born on 20 April 1946 in the village of Suluagwari, near Malu'u on the island of Malaita. He is a former High Court judge and Attorney General. He was twice elected President of the Solomon Islands Bar Association, the second time in 2007 to succeed Ranjit Hewagama. Whereas David Campbell was Solomon Islands' first local lawyer, Kabui was the country's first law graduate upon completing his studies at the University of Papua New Guinea in 1975. Kabui also served as Chairman of the Law Reform Commission.

=== Political career ===
==== 2009 nomination ====
Kabui was nominated by the National Parliament to become Governor General after the fourth round with thirty votes. The Chairman of the Public Service Commission, Edmund Andresen, received eight votes while Kabui's predecessor, Nathaniel Waena, received seven. Three members were not present. The list of candidates also included former Prime Minister and current Speaker of Parliament Peter Kenilorea and five other candidates. Following the completion of this nomination process in Parliament, the formal appointment as Governor-General was then issued by Elizabeth II, Queen of Solomon Islands. His election came as the country celebrated thirty-one years of independence.

Kabui attended a ceremony at the Lawson Tama Stadium on 7 July 2009, where several thousand people saw him take his oath. He inspected a guard of honour by the Royal Solomon Islands Police Force and received the royal salute during a parade.

On 8 July 2009 in Honiara, Kabui presented an award to athlete Jim Marau, who, in 1975, became Solomon Islands' first South Pacific Games gold medallist. Marau was awarded during the Independence Celebration in Lawson Tama.

On 9 October 2009, Kabui was appointed a Knight Grand Cross of the Order of St Michael and St George.

Government offices
Preceded by Sir Nathaniel Waena	Governor General of Solomon Islands; 2009–2019	Succeeded by Sir David Vunagi
