= Bartholomew Ulufa'alu =

Prime Minister of Solomon Islands (1997–2000)

Bartholomew (Bart) Ulufa'alu
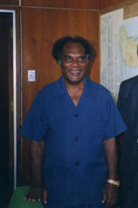
- Ulufa'alu in 1999

Prime Minister of the Solomon Islands
- In office 27 August 1997 – 30 June 2000
- Monarch: Elizabeth II
- Governors-General: Moses Pitakaka; John Lapli
- Preceded by: Solomon Mamaloni
- Succeeded by: Manasseh Sogavare

Personal details
- Born: 25 December 1950 Malaita, British Solomon Islands (today in Malaita Province, Solomon Islands)
- Died: 25 May 2007 (aged 56) Honiara, Solomon Islands
- Party: Solomon Islands Liberal Party

Bartholomew (Bart) Ulufa'alu CMG (25 December 1950 – 25 May 2007) was the prime minister of Solomon Islands from 27 August 1997 to 30 June 2000.

== Early career ==
He completed his schooling at Aruligo Secondary School and received a Bachelor of Economics from The University of Papua New Guinea (UPNG), during which time he was also President of the UPNG Students' Union.

He founded the Solomon Islands General Workers' Union and also founded and led the union-affiliated National Democratic Party (NADEPA) in 1975. NADEPA was successful in the 1976 national elections, gaining 8 seats (including Ulufa'alu in the seat of East Honiara) in the 38 member Legislative Assembly. Ulufa'alu was appointed the first ever Leader of the Official Opposition.

NADEPA fared poorly after the 1980 elections, winning only two seats and they subsequently joined the opposition. After the 'Independent Group' led by Francis Billy Hilly withdrew their support for the Kenilorea government in 1981, Solomon Mamaloni became prime minister and Ulufa'alu became Minister of Finance of the Solomon Islands.

Ulufa'alu is generally regarded as having performed well as Finance Minister and perhaps because this distracted him from attending to his constituency, he was defeated in 1984. Out of office, he went into business and headed up both the Solomon Islands Chamber of Commerce and the Farmers' Association. In 1988, he split with fellow unionist Joses Tuhanuku and formed the Solomon Islands Liberal Party (in the meantime, Tuhanuku and the Solomon Islands Trade Union Congress established the Solomon Islands Labour Party). He was re-elected in 1989 and joined the opposition group, but in 1990, he resigned from parliament after accepting an offer from Prime Minister Mamaloni of a well-paid two-year consultancy with the Prime Minister's Office.

== Prime Minister (1997–2000) ==
Ulufa'alu won office for the third time when he was elected as the member for Aoke/Langalanga constituency in 1997 (a seat he held through two further elections in 2001 and 2006 until he died). He was able to muster a slender majority to defeat veteran politician Solomon Mamaloni for the position of prime minister in 1997. Ulufa'alu was faced with difficult economic problems: debts were high, government spending was out of control, and logging was occurring at an unsustainable rate. He set about implementing much-needed reforms to improve government financial management and cut down on corruption; however, he was constantly harassed by motions of no confidence (in November 1997, April 1998, and September 1998), the last of which he only won in a tied vote.

The second half of the Ulufa'alu government was overwhelmed by the internal conflict commonly known as the 'Ethnic Tensions'. By late 1998, militants on the island of Guadalcanal commenced a campaign of intimidation and violence toward Malaitan settlers. During the next year, thousands of Malaitans fled back to Malaita or to the capital Honiara (which, although situated on Guadalcanal, is predominantly populated by Malaitans and Solomon Islanders from other provinces). In 1999, the Malaita Eagle Force (MEF) was established in response.

The Ulufa'alu government struggled to respond to the complexities of this evolving conflict. In late 1999, the government declared a four-month state of emergency. There were a number of attempts at reconciliation ceremonies but to no avail. He also requested assistance from Australia and New Zealand in 1999 but this was rejected.

In June 2000, as prime minister, he was kidnapped by militia members of the MEF who felt that although he was a Malaitan, he was not doing enough to protect their interests. Ulufa'alu subsequently resigned in exchange for his release. Manasseh Sogavare, who had earlier been Finance Minister in Ulufa'alu's government but had subsequently joined the opposition, was elected as prime minister by 23–21 over Rev. Leslie Boseto. Sogavare's election was shrouded in controversy because six MPs who were alleged supporters of Boseto were unable to attend parliament for the crucial vote.

== Later career and death ==
After the 2006 election, Ulufa'alu's Liberal Party joined with independents and four other parties (the Social Credit (SoCred) Party, the Party for Rural Advancement, the Nasnol Pati and the Democratic Party) to form the 'Grand Coalition for Change' (GCC). Their aim was to unseat the ruling coalition of the People's Alliance Party (headed by outgoing Prime Minister Sir Allan Kemakeza) and the Association of Independent Members (headed by outgoing Deputy Prime Minister Snyder Rini). The head of SoCred, Sogavare, broke away from the GCC after they failed to nominate him as their candidate for prime minister. He threw his support behind Rini and was rewarded with the post of Minister for Commerce.

However, on 18 April 2006, the announcement that Rini had been elected prime minister led to the 'April Riots', which resulted in three days of looting and property damage in Chinatown and, to a lesser extent, the Honiara CBD and its industrial area, Rinadi. In the aftermath, Sogavare switched sides and rejoined the GCC in return for which, he was nominated as their prime ministerial candidate and was duly elected on 5 May 2006.

Ulufa'alu suffered from diabetes and as a result, he had a leg amputated in 2004 and had developed partial blindness. Despite his illness, Ulufa'alu was appointed as finance minister in the GCC Government but was sacked only five months later, ostensibly on grounds of ill health. However, it was reported that the real reason was that he failed to vote in favour of Sogavare during a motion of no confidence – he was absent from parliament at the time of the vote.

In June 2006, he was reported to be critically ill and had not been in his office for several weeks. He seemed to make a good recovery and was back in his role as finance minister before his dismissal. His illness returned, however, and he died on 25 May 2007.

Political offices
Preceded by Solomon Mamaloni	Prime Minister of the Solomon Islands; 1997–2000	Succeeded by Manasseh Sogavare
