= Moses Pitakaka =

Governor-General of Solomon Islands from 1994 to 1999 (1945–2011)

Sir Moses Pitakaka GCMG

3rd Governor General of Solomon Islands
- In office 7 July 1994 – 7 July 1999
- Monarch: Elizabeth II
- Prime Minister: Sir Francis Billy Hilly; Solomon Mamaloni; Bartholomew Ulufa'alu
- Preceded by: Sir George Lepping
- Succeeded by: Sir John Lapli

Personal details
- Born: 24 January 1945 Choiseul Province, British Solomon Islands
- Died: 25 December 2011 (aged 66) Honiara, Solomon Islands
- Spouse: Lady Lois Pitakaka

Sir Moses Puibangara Pitakaka GCMG (24 January 1945 – 25 December 2011) served as the third Governor-General of the Solomon Islands from 7 July 1994 until 7 July 1999. Pitakaka was from Choiseul Province. His widow is Lady Lois Pitakaka.

On 15 June 1999, Pitakaka declared a state of emergency after an outbreak of ethnic violence killed four on Guadalcanal.

He died at the National Referral Hospital in Honiara early on the morning of Christmas Day 2011. He received a state funeral on 28 December.

Preceded by Sir George Lepping	Governor-General of the Solomon Islands; 1994–1999	Succeeded by Sir John Lapli
