= Nathan Tome =

Solomon Islander bishop

Nathan Tome is an Anglican bishop.

Tome was the second Bishop of Banks and Torres, serving from 2001 to 2013. He then became the inaugural Bishop of Guadalcanal. During 2016 he was the Acting Primate of Melanesia; he retired effective 20 September 2020.
