= Francis Billy Hilly =

Solomon Islands politician (1948–2025)

Sir Francis Billy Hilly KCMG

Prime Minister of Solomon Islands
- In office 18 June 1993 – 7 November 1994
- Monarch: Elizabeth II
- Governors General: George Lepping; Moses Pitakaka
- Preceded by: Solomon Mamaloni
- Succeeded by: Solomon Mamaloni

Personal details
- Born: 20 July 1948 Emu Harbour, Ranongga Island, British Solomon Islands Protectorate (now Solomon Islands)
- Died: 10 March 2025 (aged 76) Honiara, Solomon Islands
- Party: Independent Group

Sir Francis Billy Hilly KCMG (20 July 1948 – 10 March 2025) was a Solomon Islands politician who was the Prime Minister of Solomon Islands from 18 June 1993 to 7 November 1994. He represented the Ranogga/Simbo Constituency in the National Parliament from 1976 to 1984, and represented the constituency again from 1993 onwards. Hilly was Minister of Commerce, Industry and Employment from December 2007 until his death in 2025.

== Life and career ==
Hilly was born in Emu Harbour, Ranongga Island, British Solomon Islands Protectorate on 20 July 1948. He elected to the First Parliament in 1976, and was re-elected in 1980 to the Second Parliament, which sat until 1984. He returned to Parliament in May 1993 and was re-elected in every election thereafter: in August 1997, December 2001, and April 2006. He was appointed prime minister after the 1993 election, but in October 1994, resigned after not having sufficient support in the Parliament.

After serving as prime minister, he was Leader of the Opposition from 1994 to 1995. He was one of two candidates nominated by the government for the position of prime minister in June 2000, but the opposition's candidate, Manasseh Sogavare, was elected. In July 2004, he became Leader of the Opposition again, receiving five votes from the eight members of the opposition who were present and defeating the other candidate for the position, Alfred Sasako. Following his election, he said that, unlike the two previous Opposition Leaders, he would not cross the floor to join the government, stressing the importance of the role of Opposition Leader. He remained Leader of the Opposition until 4 April 2006.

Hilly opposed the election of Snyder Rini as prime minister on 18 April 2006, alleging that bribes were used to gain votes for Rini and that the election "was controlled and influenced by outsiders". In May 2006, Hilly became Minister of Commerce, Industries and Employment under Prime Minister Manasseh Sogavare. However, in August 2006, he was dismissed from that position, a decision that he said was primarily due to an agreement between his National Party and the People's Republic of China in 2005; the Solomon Islands recognises the Republic of China (Taiwan).

He also served for periods as Minister for Home Affairs and as Minister for Health and Medical Services and deputy prime minister. In Parliament, he was Chairman of the Public Accounts Committee from 15 November 2004 to 5 December 2005 and became Chairman of the Parliamentary House Committee on 10 May 2006.

After Sogavare was defeated in a no-confidence vote in December 2007, Hilly again became Minister of Commerce, Industry and Employment under Prime Minister Derek Sikua on 22 December 2007.

Hilly was Minister of Finance and Treasury in 2010.

Already Companion of the Order of St Michael and St George (CMG), Hilly was appointed Knight Commander of the Order of St Michael and St George (KCMG) in the 2012 Birthday Honours. On 10 March 2025, Hilly died at the age of 76.

Political offices
Preceded by Solomon Mamaloni	Prime Minister of the Solomon Islands; 1993–1994	Succeeded by Solomon Mamaloni
