= Order of Solomon Islands =

- Type: Order
- Awarded for: Contribution and dedication of time, energy and resources to advance the well being of the people of Solomon Islands
- Country: Solomon Islands
- Post-nominals: various according to grade
- Established: 1981

Precedence
- Next (higher): None

The Order of Solomon Islands is the Order of Merit of the Solomon Islands. It was established under Royal Warrant in 1981 and amended on 5 October 1982. It is composed of three grades:

- Star of Solomon Islands (SSI)
- Cross of Solomon Islands (CSI)
- Solomon Islands Medal (SIM)

This order is awarded to civilians or members of the armed forces, when a courageous act is involved.
