= Youth Challenge International (Canada) =

Youth Challenge International (YCI) is a youth-centered, non-profit, non-religious, non-governmental organization focused on international development issues. It aims to equip developing country youth with skills and resources to contribute positively to their communities along with engaging Canadian youths in international development and social justice issues. Over 201 Canadian youth volunteer overseas annually with YCI.

== Overview ==
Youth Challenge International (YCI) is a Canadian non-profit organization dedicated to youth development and positive social change.

Its mission is to build the skills, experience, and confidence of young people to effect change in their communities.

YCI operates on four core principles:

- Youth Involvement – youth lead and make decisions in projects
- Volunteerism – central motivating force
- Partnership – collaboration with local youth-led/focused organizations
- Youth Capacity Building – enabling autonomous, effective youth and organizations

YCI focuses on youth in the Global South, addressing innovation, gender inequality, and climate change through programs in politically stable developing countries.

Partners in the past include autonomous local non-profits (e.g., Youth Challenge Guyana, Reto Juvenil International, ZANGOC Tanzania, YMCA-Ghana) supported by international field staff. Long-term goal: build partner capacity for regional leadership in development, health, and conservation.

YCI also collaborates with Canadian groups like YMCA Canada, YMCA GTA, Club 2/3, and Oxfam Quebec in countries such as Ghana and Benin.

== History ==
Founded in 1989 and inspired by the United Kingdom's Operation Raleigh (1984–1988), YCI began by sending Canadian youth to Guyana in 1990 to collaborate with local youth on conservation, infrastructure, and health projects. That same year, it partnered with the Adventure Club of the Soviet Union for a joint Canadian-Russian expedition in the Arctic involving community service and research.

In 1991, YCI launched a similar program in Costa Rica. By 1992, autonomous local organizations were established in Guyana and Costa Rica. Australian alumni of Operation Raleigh founded Youth Challenge Australia around the same time.

In 1997, YCI, Youth Challenge Guyana, Reto Juvenil Internacional (Costa Rica), and Youth Challenge Australia formed the Youth Alliance Council for annual cooperative planning while remaining independent.

Through the 1990s and 2000s, YCI expanded to over 15 countries and supported more than 2,500 volunteer placements. From 2006, it engaged Canadian youth domestically via Volunteer Action Teams to raise awareness of global issues. In 2009, it launched Youth Challenge America in the United States.

In June 2019, two Canadian female volunteers, aged 19 and 20 from YCI were abducted in Kumasi, Ghana and rescued by police after eight days; four men were later convicted of kidnapping-related charges in 2022.

== HerStart ==
HerStart is a program launched in 2020 as part of Canada's Volunteer Cooperation Program (funded by Global Affairs Canada), it runs through approximately 2028 and supports 373 Canadian volunteer placements.

The program operates in Ghana, Tanzania, and Uganda. It works with local partner organizations to provide training, mentorship, business development support, and access to seed capital for young women interested in starting or growing social enterprises, businesses intended to generate social and/or environmental benefits alongside revenue.

The initiative addresses economic and social challenges faced by marginalized groups, particularly women and girls, and aligns with the Sustainable Development Goals. It includes efforts to strengthen local partners' capacity for inclusive, innovative, and environmentally sustainable initiatives that promote gender equality.

As of March 2025, the program had organized 269 volunteer assignments, involving partners in the three countries and deploying volunteers in areas such as gender equality, social entrepreneurship, climate action, and related fields.

== Procedure ==
The ideal YCI volunteer candidate is aged 18–35, interested in international youth development, motivated to make positive change, seeking an international team-based experience, and available for 5 to 12 weeks. Since there are programs throughout the year, volunteers have different options in terms of dates. YCI programs are structured to be team-based; youth volunteers will live and work with fellow Canadian youth or youth from their host countries.

A main component of YCI is selecting individuals to volunteer overseas on various projects. Although the process is not competitive, volunteers are selected on their own merits. Past travel, work, education, volunteer experience as well as skills and interests are taken into consideration when deciding where to place an individual. Candidates must undergo a phone interview, during which a YCI Volunteer Program staff member will help the candidate to determine which country he or she is best suited for. There is both a pre-departure learning curriculum and in-country orientation to help prepare and equip volunteers with the necessary tools and skills to complete successful placements.
