= Baddeley Devesi =

Governor-General of Solomon Islands from 1978 to 1988

Sir Baddeley Devesi GCMG GCVO
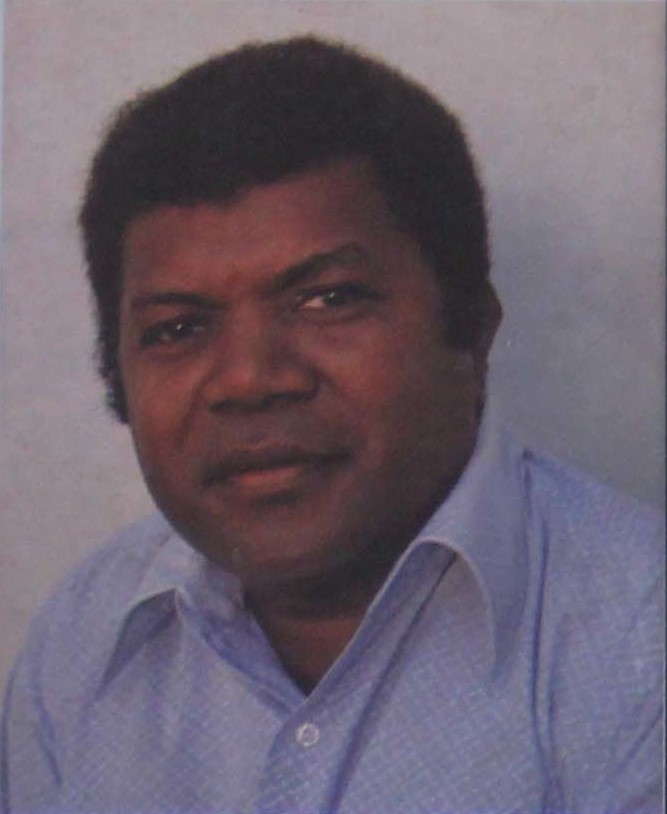

1st Governor-General of the Solomon Islands
- In office 7 July 1978 – 7 July 1988
- Monarch: Elizabeth II
- Prime Minister: Peter Kenilorea; Solomon Mamaloni; Ezekiel Alebua
- Preceded by: Office Established
- Succeeded by: Sir George Lepping

Personal details
- Born: 16 October 1941 Tathimboko, Guadalcanal, British Solomon Islands
- Died: 16 February 2012 (aged 70)

Sir Baddeley Devesi GCMG GCVO (16 October 1941 – 16 February 2012) was a Solomon Islander politician who served as the first Governor-General of the Solomon Islands for two consecutive terms.

He was born in Guadalcanal. He served as the first Governor-General of the Solomon Islands from 7 July 1978 to 7 July 1988. Later, he served as Foreign Minister from 1989 to 1990, Interior Minister from 1990 to 1992, and Deputy Prime Minister from 1990 to 1993 and 1997 to 2000, until the government was removed by a coup d'etat.

As a leader during the independence, he criticized Britain for its lack of preparation for the handover of autonomy, which ultimately led to the political crises the Solomons have suffered following independence. He quipped that "the empire was leaving behind a system of British justice and Parliament, but for an island nation with 4 volcanoes and 70 languages." In particular he was concerned about the absence of preparation for economic development.

In 1993, he addressed the United Nations General Assembly with concerns that the United Nations Framework Convention on Climate Change did not sufficiently address the issue of global warming. He was also a strong advocate of the Treaty of Rarotonga.

Leading up to the coup, he had strongly recommended to the Australian and New Zealand High Commissioner that they send peacekeepers. He encouraged election observers to ensure an orderly formation of a government after the 2006 election.

Baddeley was also, briefly, a teacher and acting head teacher at the Diocese of Melanesia (Anglican) Vera'na'aso Primary School, Maravovo during 1966–67. He died on 16 February 2012, aged 70.

Government offices
Preceded by None – position created; Sir Collin Allan was the last Governor of the British Solomon Islands Protectorate prior to independence.	Governor-General of the Solomon Islands; 1978–1988	Succeeded by George Lepping
