= Peter Kenilorea =

Prime Minister of Solomon Islands (1943–2016)

The Right Honourable Sir Peter Kenilorea KBE
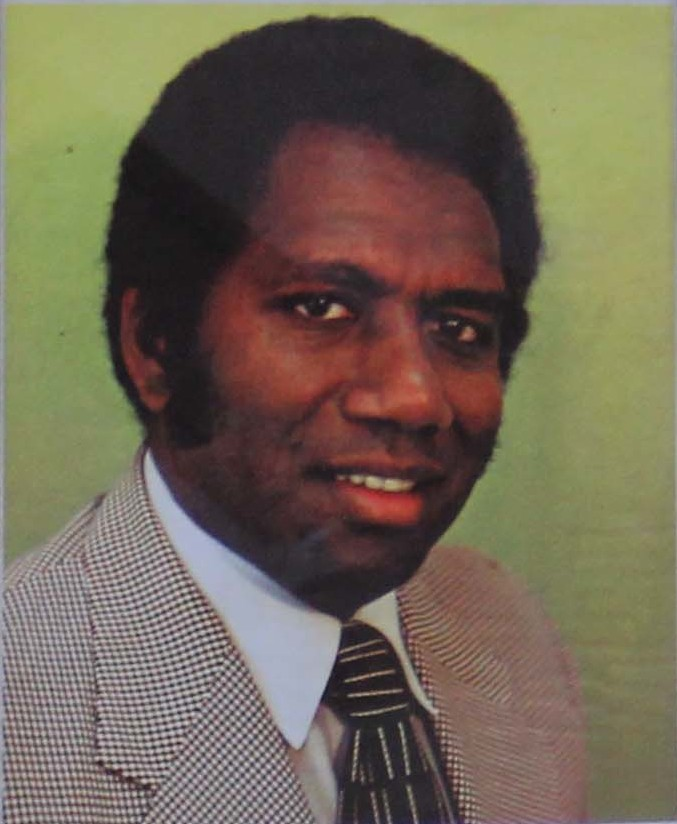

1st & 3rd Prime Minister of Solomon Islands
- In office 19 November 1984 – 1 December 1986
- Monarch: Elizabeth II
- Governor General: Baddeley Devesi
- Preceded by: Solomon Mamaloni
- Succeeded by: Ezekiel Alebua
- In office 7 July 1978 – 31 August 1981
- Monarch: Elizabeth II
- Governor General: Baddeley Devesi
- Preceded by: Position established
- Succeeded by: Solomon Mamaloni

Personal details
- Born: 23 May 1943 Takataka, Malaita, British Solomon Islands
- Died: 24 February 2016 (aged 72) Honiara, Solomon Islands
- Party: Solomon Islands United Party

Sir Peter Kenilorea KBE (23 May 1943 – 24 February 2016) was a Solomon Islander politician, officially styled The Rt Hon. Sir Peter Kenilorea as a member of the Privy Council of the United Kingdom. He was the first prime minister of an independent Solomon Islands, from 1978 to 1981, and also served a second term from 1984 to 1986.

== Early life and education ==
Kenilorea was born in Takataka village on Malaita island, of ꞌAreꞌare ethnicity.

Kenilorea attended school in Malaita and Honiara. He then received a scholarship to study in New Zealand, where he attended Wesley College, Whanganui Collegiate School, and Ardmore College. He trained to be a teacher while at Ardmore, and he began work as a schoolteacher after returning to Malaita. He was trained as a teacher for the South Seas Evangelical Church and a co-founder of the Solomon Islands Christian Association.

Kenilorea had a wife, Margaret, and had seven or eight children.

== Political career ==
Kenilorea got involved in politics and became a founding member of the Solomon Islands United Party. In the 1973 general elections he ran in the ꞌAreꞌare constituency, losing to David Kausimae.

He was asked to start a campaign in the 1976 election to be the representative for his district in Malaita. When Kenilorea asked who else was in consideration, he was informed that all six of the other potential candidates withdrew so he could run. He was elected to National Parliament in the East ꞌAreꞌare constituency.

As the then British Solomon Islands protectorate developed a serious movement to declare independence from the United Kingdom, Kenilorea became the colonial administration's chief minister and a major figure of the independence movement. Kenilorea was critical of British rule over the Solomon Islands, alleging that it failed to advance the nation economically and condemning it for building only one school. He was involved in the independence negotiations that took place in London.

After the protectorate became an independent country in 1978, Kenilorea became the first Prime Minister of Solomon Islands. The country had yet to develop a distinct national identity, and he found himself with the duties of a cultural leader as well as a political one. He was only 35 years old when he took office, in a nation which traditionally associated leadership with elders. He reconciled this with his belief that traditional leadership could exist among the people but that national leadership should be run by the well-educated.

Under Kenilorea's leadership, the United Party held its plurality with 16 seats in the National Parliament after the 1980 election. The Independent Group and its 15 seats also supported Kenilorea, allowing for his re-election as prime minister. The opposition leader Solomon Mamaloni began raising policy issues that would cause disputes between the United Party and the independents. By 1981, the six independents that had been appointed to Kenilorea's government resigned their posts. That October, Kenilorea's government was dissolved after a motion of no confidence. Mamaloni succeeded Kenilorea as prime minister.

Kenilorea returned as prime minister after the 1984 election, with 21 members of the National Parliament supporting him and only 13 supporting Mamaloni. As prime minister, he organised the nation's provincial system of government and passed tribal land rights into law. Kenilorea served as prime minister until 1986. He resigned after being implicated in a financial scandal, and he was succeeded by his Deputy Prime Minister, Ezekiel Alebua. Kenilorea then became Minister of Foreign Affairs, serving in this role from 1988 to 1989 and from 1990 to 1993.

When ethnic conflict broke out between two militant groups, the Malaita Eagle Force and the Isatabu Freedom Movement, Kenilorea was one of the leaders of peace talks in 2000. He was seen as a unifying figure who had the respect of both groups. Along with Paul Tovua, he became co-chairman of the peace talks. He then became chairman of the Peace Monitoring Council. From 2001 to 2010, Kenilorea was the Speaker of Parliament. He was a candidate for the post of Governor-General in mid-June 2004, but he received only 8 of 41 votes in Parliament, placing second behind Nathaniel Waena, who received 27 votes. He subsequently sought to return to the National Parliament and was an unsuccessful candidate in a by-election in East ꞌAreꞌare in August 2012.

== Death and legacy ==
Kenilorea died on 24 February 2016 following a period of illness. His funeral was held in Honiara on 1 March, which was made a special public holiday as a national day of mourning. His body had lain in state in the parliament.

Kenilorea is recognised as the founding father of Solomon Islands.

Kenilorea's son Peter Kenilorea Jr. was elected a member of parliament in April 2019.

Political offices
Preceded by None – Position Created	Prime Minister of Solomon Islands (first time); 1978–1981	Succeeded by Solomon Mamaloni
Preceded by Solomon Mamaloni	Prime Minister of Solomon Islands (second time); 1984–1986	Succeeded by Ezekiel Alebua
