= Ezekiel Alebua =

Solomon Islands politician (1947–2022)

The Right Honourable Ezekiel Alebua PC

3rd Prime Minister of the Solomon Islands
- In office 1 December 1986 – 28 March 1989
- Monarch: Elizabeth II
- Governors-General: Baddeley Devesi; George Lepping
- Preceded by: Sir Peter Kenilorea
- Succeeded by: Solomon Mamaloni

Foreign Minister of the Solomon Islands
- In office 1981–1982

Member of Parliament for East Guadalcanal
- In office 1980–1997

Personal details
- Born: 1947 Avuavu, Guadalcanal, British Solomon Islands
- Died: 7 August 2022 (aged 75) Haimatua, Guadalcanal, Solomon Islands
- Party: Solomon Islands United Party
- Children: 8

Ezekiel Alebua PC (June 1947 – 7 August 2022) was the 3rd Prime Minister of Solomon Islands from 1986 to 1989, and Premier of the Guadalcanal Province from 1998 to 2003. He was a member of the National Parliament of Solomon Islands representing the East Guadalcanal constituency from 1980 to 1997.

== Early life ==
Ezekiel Alebua was born at the Avuavu Catholic Mission Station in Avuavu, Guadalcanal, British Solomon Islands, in 1947, to Dominic and Romana Saiboli. His father was catechist at the mission. Alebua was educated at St. Joseph's Catholic School in Tenaru. He served in the British colonial administration civil service and received some education at the University of the South Pacific.

== Career ==
In the 1980 election Alebua won a seat in the National Parliament of Solomon Islands representing the East Guadalcanal constituency. He served in parliament until Johnson Koli succeeded him after the 1997 election.

Prime Minister Solomon Mamaloni appointed Alebua as Minister of Foreign Affairs and Trade. As minister for foreign affairs and internation trade he went to China to start negoations that led to diplomatic relations between the Solomon Islands and China being established and a memorandum of understanding being signed on 10 April 1982. Prime Minister Peter Kenilorea appointed Alebua as deputy prime minister and minister of agriculture in 1984. Alebua served as the 3rd Prime Minister of Solomon Islands from 1 December 1986 to 28 March 1989.

In July 1988, Alebua was appointed to the Privy Council after being nominated by Prime Minister Margaret Thatcher.

Alebua was elected to the Guadalcanal Provincial Assembly in 1998. He became premier in 1998, and served until 2003. On 1 June 2001, an assassination attempt was made against Alebua. Alebua was sentenced to three-and-a-half years in prison in 2007 on charges of embezzlement while serving as premier.

== Death ==
Alebua fathered eight children. He died in Haimatua on 7 August 2022.

== Works cited ==
=== Books ===
- Moore, Clive (2022). Honiara: Village-City of Solomon Islands. ANU Press. ISBN 9781760465063.
- Wesley-Smith, Terence; Porter, Edgar (2010). China in Oceania: Reshaping the Pacific?. Berghahn Books. ISBN 9781845456320.

=== News ===
- "Former Prime Minister Ezekiel Alebua Dies". Solomon Times. 8 August 2022. Archived from the original on 7 August 2022.
- Iroga, Robert (12 August 2022). "From Clerical Assistant to Prime Minister. A Reflection on the Life of Rt. Hon. Ezekiel Alebua". Solomon Business Magazine. Archived from the original on 5 October 2022.

=== Web ===
- "PM Announces Passing of Right Honourable Ezekiel Alebua, Former Prime Minister". Solomon Islands Government. 8 August 2022. Archived from the original on 8 August 2022.

Political offices
Preceded by Peter Kenilorea	Prime Minister of the Solomon Islands; 1986–1989	Succeeded by Solomon Mamaloni
