= Solomon Islands Medal =

- Type: Order
- Awarded for: Contribution and dedication of time, energy and resources to advance the well being of the people of Solomon Islands
- Country: Solomon Islands
- Post-nominals: SIM
- Established: 1981
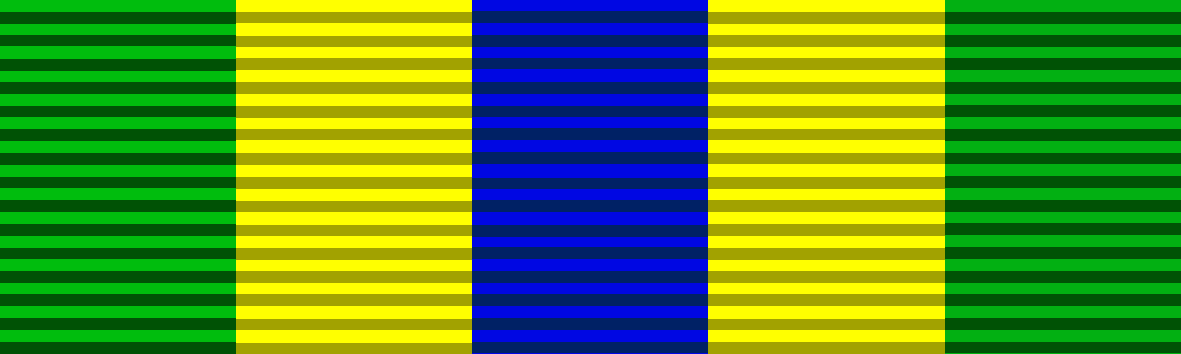
- Ribbon bar of the award

Precedence
- Next (higher): Knight/Dame Commander of the Order of the British Empire (KBE/DBE)
- Next (lower): Officer of the Order of the British Empire (OBE)

The Solomon Islands Medal is a third-class award of the Order of the Solomon Islands, an order of chivalry in the Solomon Islands. It was instituted in 1981 by royal charter.

This medal is given to a maximum of forty people each year, and there must be fewer than two hundred recipients at any one time.

This award is placed by the Court of St James's (the royal court for the Sovereign of the United Kingdom) immediately above the Officer of the Most Excellent Order of the British Empire (OBE), and below the Knight/Dame Commander of the Most Excellent Order of the British Empire (KBE/DBE).
