= Solomon Mamaloni =

Prime Minister of the Solomon Islands (1943–2000)

2nd, 5th & 7th Prime Minister of Solomon Islands
- In office 7 November 1994 – 27 August 1997
- Monarch: Elizabeth II
- Governor-General: Sir Moses Pitakaka
- Preceded by: Francis Billy Hilly
- Succeeded by: Bartholomew Ulufa'alu
- In office 28 March 1989 – 18 June 1993
- Monarch: Elizabeth II
- Governor-General: Sir George Lepping
- Preceded by: Ezekiel Alebua
- Succeeded by: Francis Billy Hilly
- In office 30 August 1981 – 19 November 1984
- Monarch: Elizabeth II
- Governor-General: Sir Baddeley Devesi
- Preceded by: Peter Kenilorea
- Succeeded by: Peter Kenilorea

Leader of the Opposition
- In office 1998 – 11 January 2000
- Preceded by: Edward Huni'ehu
- Succeeded by: Manasseh Sogavare
- In office 1993–1994
- Preceded by: Joses Tuhanuku
- Succeeded by: Baddeley Devesi
- In office 1984–1988
- Preceded by: Peter Kenilorea
- Succeeded by: Andrew Nori
- In office 1980–1981
- Preceded by: Bartholomew Ulufa'alu
- Succeeded by: Peter Kenilorea

Chief Minister of the British Solomon Islands
- In office 1974–1976
- Monarch: Elizabeth II
- Governor: Sir Donald Luddington

Personal details
- Born: 23 January 1943 Rumahui, Makira, British Solomon Islands
- Died: 11 January 2000 (aged 56) Honiara, Solomon Islands
- Party: People's Progressive Party (1973–1979/80); People's Alliance Party (1979/80–1992/3); Group for National Unity and Reconciliation (1993–1994); Solomon Islands National Unity, Reconciliation and Progressive Party (1994–1997)

Solomon Sunaone Mamaloni (23 January 1943 – 11 January 2000) was a Solomon Islands politician. He was the first chief minister of the islands, and later served as the prime minister for three spells in the 1980s and 1990s.

== Biography ==
Mamaloni was born in 1943 in Rumahui, Arosi, in West Makira. He was educated at Pawa School and King George VI Secondary School before attending Te Aute College in New Zealand. He joined the civil service in 1966, initially working as an executive officer for the Legislative Council, before becoming a clerk.

He was elected to the Governing Council from the Makira constituency in the 1970 elections. After being re-elected in 1973, he was involved in the establishment of the People's Progressive Party the following January. Later in 1974, the new post of Chief Minister was established, with Mamaloni being elected after the sixth round of voting.

He served as Chief Minister of the Solomon Islands until July 1976. Although he resigned from the Legislative Assembly in December 1976, he returned to politics and represented the West Makira constituency in the National Parliament. He was Leader of the Opposition from 1980 to 1981, 1984 to 1988, and 1993 to 1994. He was again chosen as Leader of the Opposition in late September 1998, replacing Job Dudley Tausinga.

His role as architect of the Solomon Islands' independence from British rule in 1978 buoyed Mamaloni's support, and he served as opposition leader until his death.

He remained Opposition Leader until his death from kidney disease in a Honiara hospital in January 2000. His funeral was held on 13 January.

Political offices
Preceded by Peter Kenilorea	Prime Minister of the Solomon Islands (first time); 1981-1984	Succeeded by Peter Kenilorea
Preceded by Ezekiel Alebua	Prime Minister of the Solomon Islands (second time); 1989-1993	Succeeded by Francis Billy Hilly
Preceded by Francis Billy Hilly	Prime Minister of the Solomon Islands (third time); 1994-1997	Succeeded by Bartholomew Ulufa'alu
