= Governor-General of Solomon Islands =

Representative of the monarch

- Badge

- Flag of the governor-general

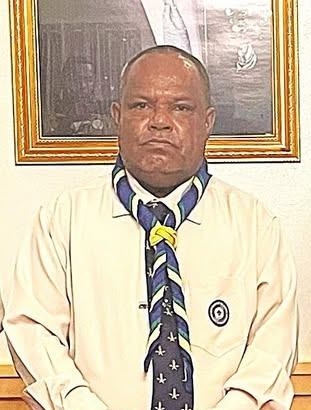
- Incumbent; Sir David Tiva Kapu since 7 July 2024
- Viceroy
- Style: His Excellency
- Residence: Government House, Honiara
- Appointer: Monarch of Solomon Islands; on the nomination by the National Parliament
- Term length: Five years, renewable once
- Constituting instrument: Constitution of Solomon Islands
- Formation: 7 July 1978
- First holder: Sir Baddeley Devesi
- Salary: SI$130,000 annually

The governor-general of Solomon Islands is the representative of the Solomon Islands' monarch, currently King Charles III, in Solomon Islands. The governor-general is appointed by the monarch after their nomination by the National Parliament by vote. The functions of the governor-general include appointing ministers, judges, and ambassadors; giving royal assent to legislation passed by parliament; and issuing writs for election.

In general, the governor-general observes the conventions of the Westminster system and responsible government, maintaining a political neutrality, and has to always act only on the advice of the prime minister. The governor-general also has a ceremonial role: hosting events at the official residence—Government House in the capital, Honiara—and bestowing honours to individuals and groups who are contributing to Solomon Islands and their communities. When travelling abroad, the governor-general is seen as the representative of Solomon Islands and its monarch.

Governors-general are appointed for a five-year term of office. Since 7 July 2024, the governor-general has been Sir David Tiva Kapu.

The office of the governor-general was created on 7 July 1978, when Solomon Islands gained independence from the United Kingdom as a sovereign state and an independent constitutional monarchy. Since then, eight individuals have served as governor-general.

== Appointment ==
Unlike most other Commonwealth realms, the governor-general of Solomon Islands is nominated by the country's National Parliament, rather than being proposed by its prime minister (as is the convention in the other Commonwealth realms). The appointment is made by the monarch of Solomon Islands following a simple majority vote of the National Parliament. Section 27 of the Constitution of Solomon Islands provides that:

There shall be a Governor-General of Solomon Islands who shall be appointed by the Head of State in accordance with an address from Parliament and who shall be the representative of the Head of State in Solomon Islands.

The term of office is five years, and is renewable once.

=== Oath of office ===
The oath of office of the governor-general is:

"I, (name), do swear that I will well and truly serve His Majesty King Charles III, His Heirs and Successors, in the office of Governor-General of Solomon Islands. So help me God."

== Dismissal ==
The governor-general may be dismissed by the monarch "for misbehaviour or for such other cause as may be prescribed by Parliament", after an address from Parliament supported by at least two-thirds majority of all members of parliament.

If the office of governor-general becomes vacant, due to death or dismissal, the speaker of the National Parliament of Solomon Islands becomes acting governor-general until a new appointment is made. If the office of Speaker is vacant or unable to perform those functions, then the vice-regal duties are carried out by the Chief Justice.

== Functions ==
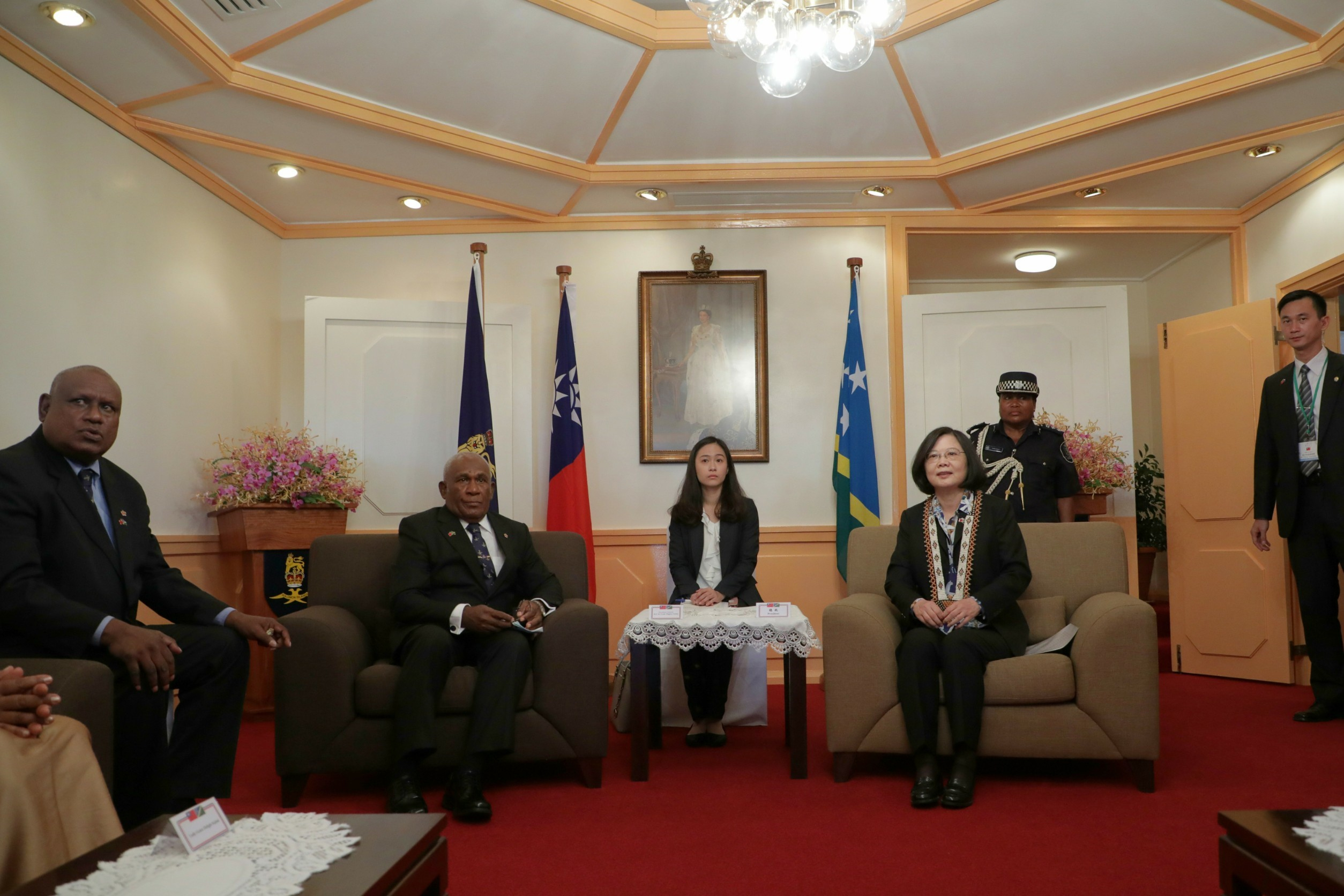
Governor-General Sir Frank Kabui with President Tsai of Taiwan at Government House, 2017

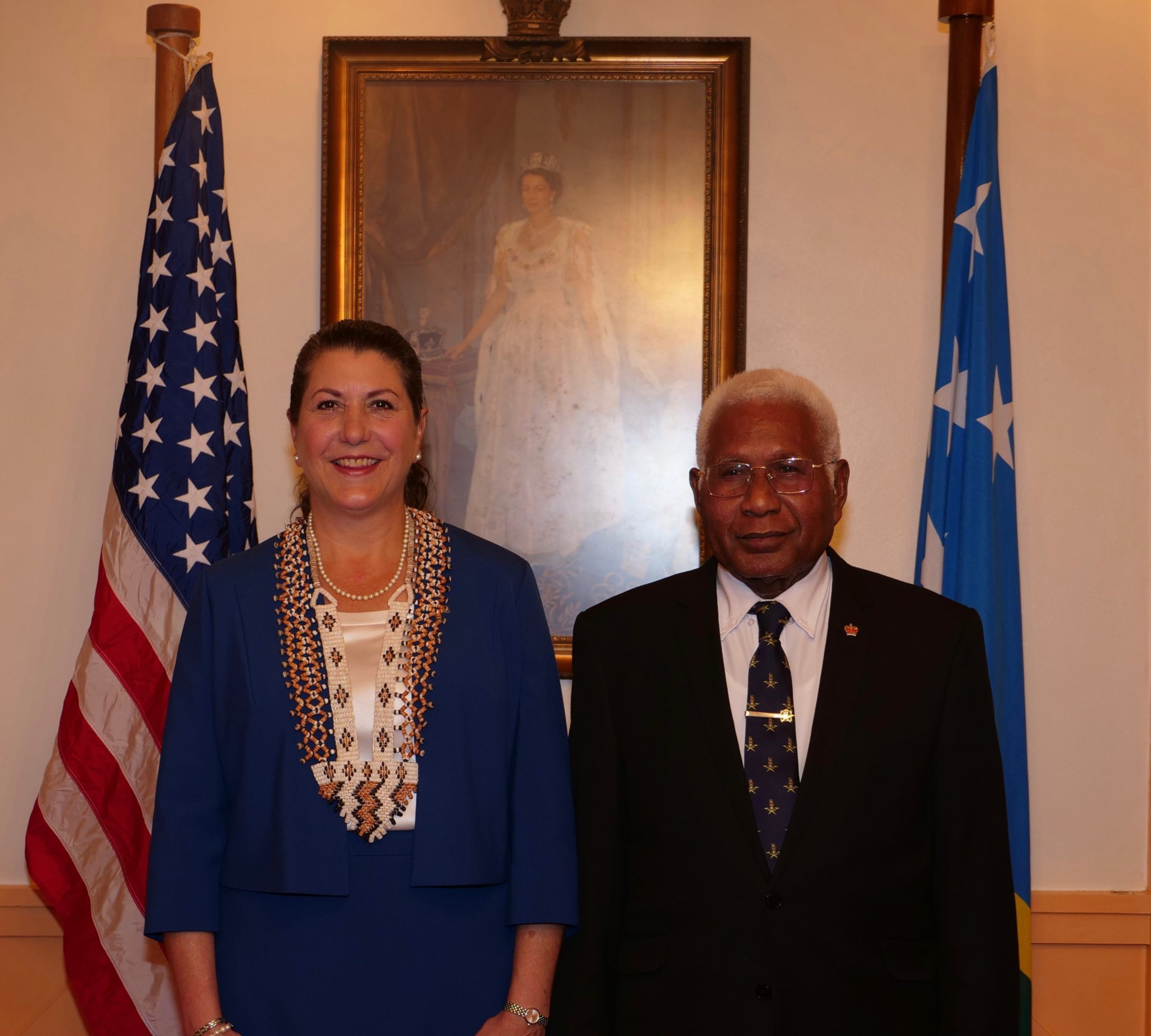
Governor-General Sir David Vunagi with Erin Elizabeth McKee, US ambassador to Solomon Islands, 2020

Solomon Islands shares the person of the sovereign equally with 14 other countries in the Commonwealth of Nations. As the sovereign works and resides outside of Solomon Islands' borders, the governor-general's primary task is to perform the monarch's constitutional duties on their behalf. As such, the governor-general carries out their functions in the government of Solomon Islands on behalf and in the name of the Sovereign.

The governor-general's powers and roles are derive from the Constitution of Solomon Islands Part IV Sections 27, 28 & 29, and set out certain provisions relating to the governor-general.

=== Constitutional role ===
The governor-general is responsible for early dissolutions of parliament, which may occur upon the resolution of an absolute majority of members of parliament. Parliamentary terms otherwise run for four years. The governor-general is responsible for appointing the date of the general election, which must occur within four months of the dissolution of parliament. After an election, the governor-general convenes a meeting of parliament to elect the prime minister in accordance with section 33 of the constitution. Once a prime minister is elected, the governor-general appoints the other ministers on the prime minister's advice.

The prime minister keeps the governor-general fully informed concerning the general conduct of the government of Solomon Islands and furnishes the governor-general with such information as the governor-general may request with respect to any particular matter relating to the government of Solomon Islands.

The governor-general, on the Sovereign's behalf, gives royal assent to laws passed by the National Parliament of Solomon Islands.

The governor-general acts on the advice of the Cabinet, to issue regulations, proclamations under existing laws, to appoint state judges, ambassadors and high commissioners to overseas countries, and other senior government officials.

The governor-general is also responsible for issuing Royal Commissions of Inquiry, and other matters, as required by particular legislation; and authorises many other executive decisions by ministers such as approving treaties with foreign governments.

The prime minister can be removed from office by the governor-general upon the passage of a no-confidence motion by an absolute majority of the members of parliament. The outgoing prime minister remains in office until a new prime minister is elected by the national parliament. In the event of the prime minister's death in office, the governor-general "after consultation with the other Ministers" appoints one of the other government ministers to act as a prime minister until a new election is held.

=== Ceremonial role ===
The governor-general's ceremonial duties include opening new sessions of parliament by delivering the Speech from the Throne, welcoming visiting heads of state, and receiving the credentials of foreign diplomats.

The governor-general also presents honours at investitures to Solomon Islanders for notable service to the community, or for acts of bravery.

=== Community role ===
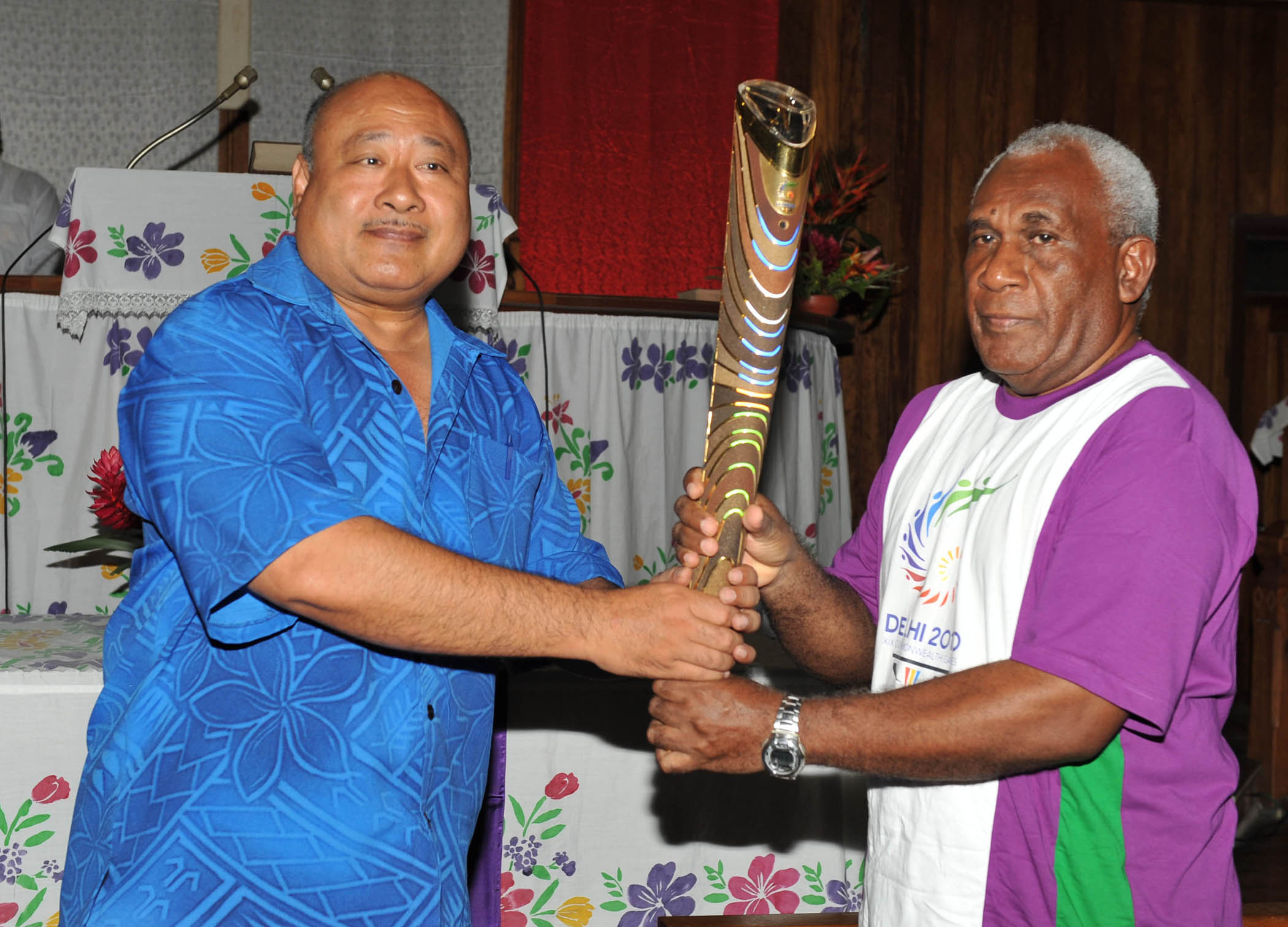
Governor-General Sir Frank Kabui receiving the Queen's Baton for the Delhi Commonwealth Games, 2010

The governor-general provides non-partisan leadership in the community, acting as patron of charitable, service, sporting and cultural organisations, and attending functions throughout the country.

The governor-general also encourages, articulates and represents those things that unite Solomon Islanders together.

== Privileges ==
=== Salary ===
The governor-general receives an annual salary of 130,000 SBD.

Former governors-general receive a pension set at sixty per cent of the incumbent governor-general's salary.

=== Symbols ===
The governor-general uses a personal flag, which features a lion passant atop a St. Edward's royal crown with "Solomon Islands" written on a two-headed frigatebird, all on a blue background. It is flown on buildings and other locations in Solomon Islands to mark the governor-general's presence.

=== Residence ===
Government House in Honiara is the official residence of the governor-general of Solomon Islands.

Upon retirement, governors-general are provided with an official residence free of rent and the cost of water, gas, and electricity is paid for by the government.

== List of governors-general ==
Following is a list of people who have served as Governor-General of Solomon Islands since independence in 1978.

Denotes Acting Governors-General

No.	Portrait	Name (Birth–Death)	Term of office			Monarch (Reign)
No.	Portrait	Name (Birth–Death)	Took office	Left office	Time in office	Monarch (Reign)
1		Sir Baddeley Devesi (1941–2012)	7 July 1978	7 July 1988	10 years	Elizabeth II (1978–2022)
2		Sir George Lepping (1947–2014)	7 July 1988	7 July 1994	6 years	Elizabeth II (1978–2022)
3		Sir Moses Pitakaka (1945–2011)	7 July 1994	7 July 1999	5 years	Elizabeth II (1978–2022)
4		Sir John Lapli (1955–2025)	7 July 1999	7 July 2004	5 years	Elizabeth II (1978–2022)
5		Sir Nathaniel Waena (1945–2026)	7 July 2004	7 July 2009	5 years	Elizabeth II (1978–2022)
6		Sir Frank Kabui (born 1946)	7 July 2009	7 July 2019	10 years	Elizabeth II (1978–2022)
7		Sir David Vunagi (1950–2025)	7 July 2019	7 July 2024	5 years	
7		Sir David Vunagi (1950–2025)	7 July 2019	7 July 2024	5 years	Charles III (2022–present)
8		Sir David Tiva Kapu (born ?)	7 July 2024	Incumbent	2 years, 75 days	Charles III (2022–present)

== See also ==
- List of resident commissioners and governors of the Solomon Islands, prior to the independence of Solomon Islands.
