= Star of Solomon Islands =

Highest honour of the Solomon Islands

Star of the Solomon Islands
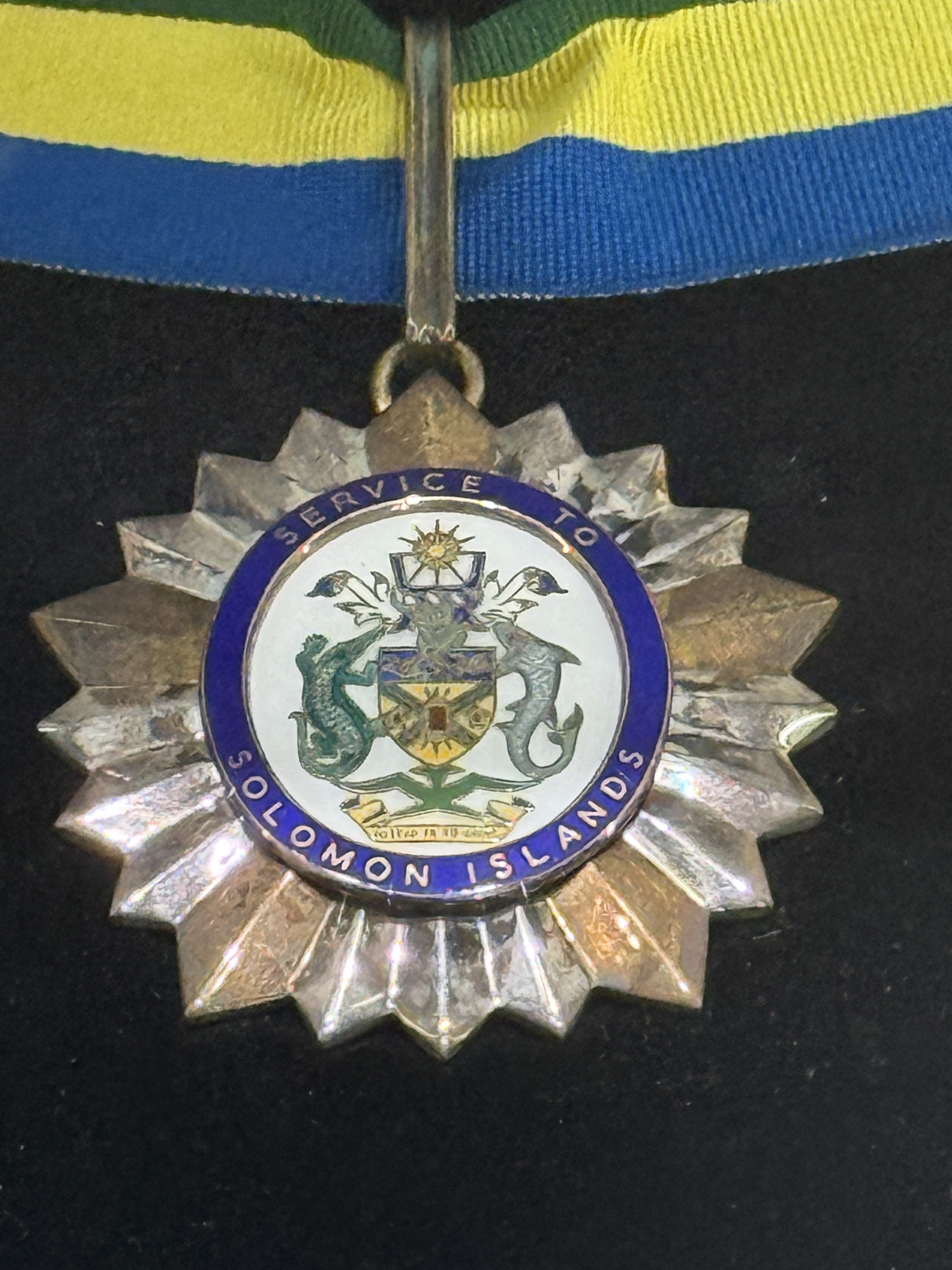
- The Star of the Solomon Islands
- Awarded for: Contribution and dedication of time, energy and resources to advance the well being of the people of Solomon Islands
- Country: Solomon Islands
- Post-nominals: SSI
- Established: 1981
- First award: 1982 (to Queen Elizabeth II)
- Ribbon bar of the award

Precedence
- Next (higher): None
- Next (lower): Knight/Dame Grand Cross of the Order of the British Empire (GBE)

The Star of the Solomon Islands, established in 1981 is the highest honour of the Solomon Islands. Queen Elizabeth II was the first recipient in 1982. Recipients are entitled to use the post-nominal letters SSI.

This award is placed by the Court of St James's (the royal court for the Sovereign of the United Kingdom) immediately above the Knight/Dame Grand Cross of the Most Excellent Order of the British Empire. It is primarily awarded to heads of state and other important international leaders. No Solomon Islander holds this award.

== Recipients ==
Notable recipients include:

- Elizabeth II, Queen of Solomon Islands (1982)
- Helen Clark ONZ, Prime Minister of New Zealand (2005)
- John Howard OM AC, Prime Minister of Australia (2005)
- Prince Richard, Duke of Gloucester KG GCVO GCStJ (2008)
- Sir Michael Somare GCL GCMG CH CF KStJ KSG PC MP, Prime Minister of Papua New Guinea (2009)
- Charles III, King of Solomon Islands (2024)
