= Cross of Solomon Islands =

- Awarded for: Contribution and dedication of time, energy and resources to advance the well being of the people of Solomon Islands
- Country: Solomon Islands
- Presented by: Governor General of Solomon Islands on the recommendation of the Prime Minister of Solomon Islands
- Eligibility: Any person, irrespective of race, nationality or citizenship, may be appointed to this class if they are distinguished persons.
- Post-nominals: CSI
- Established: 1981

Highlights
- Total: At any one issue (i.e., yearly), only ten may be awarded. There may, however, be only fifty members of this award at any one time.
- Total awarded posthumously: Greg Urwin, Graham Wilson
- Total recipients: Clive Moore, Nick Warner, James Batley, Tim George, Nicholas Coppel, Justine Braithwaite, Ernest Lee
- Ribbon bar of the award

Precedence
- Next (higher): Knight/Dame Grand Cross of the Order of the British Empire (GBE)
- Next (lower): Knight/Dame Commander of the Order of the British Empire (KBE/DBE)

The Cross of Solomon Islands (CSI) is the second class award of the Order of Solomon Islands and is awarded for "most conspicuous and outstanding service". The limitations of this class are that at any one issue (i.e., yearly) only ten may be awarded. There may, however, be only fifty members of this award at any one time. Any person, whether national or expatriate, may be appointed to this class if they are a distinguished person. The Court of St James's has placed it immediately above Knight/Dame Commander of the Most Excellent Order of the British Empire, and below Knight/Dame Grand Cross of the Most Excellent Order of the British Empire.

The medal, designed by Patrick O'Callaghan, is two inches in overall size and made in silver gilt and enamels. The straight armed cross pattee in silver gilt has linking the four arms the crescent shape symbol of the paramount chiefs. Each such link contains a double headed frigate bird which is cast into the crescent shape. In the centre the shield only of the Solomon Islands Coat-of-Arms in full colour enamels sits on a green enamel background. This is surrounded by a royal blue enamel circular band with base metal (i.e. silver gilt) piping on both circumferences and contains the wording "SERVICE TO SOLOMON ISLANDS" in raised silver gilt lettering. At the top of the cross is a ring to which a loop, made of gilt, is attached. The medal is awarded with individual metal cases covered with blue rexine and lined with green velvet.

The design of the Cross originates from two sources. The first is from the honours and awards systems throughout the world which have used for many years the basic cross shape. The second is that the cross is the traditional symbol of Christianity, which has spread throughout Solomon Islands.

All the insignia for awards in the Order of Solomon Islands are of the "neck hanging" variety, and are not accompanied by lapel pins. The reason for this is that, as the majority of the population of Solomon Islands live outside the capital city in rural areas, and in a hot and humid tropical climate, it is very acceptable for men to wear little, if any, clothing on the top half of their bodies. With nowhere to pin an award, it seemed sensible to design the award as a neck hanger.

== See also ==
- Star of Solomon Islands
- Commonwealth realms orders and decorations
