= List of political parties in the Solomon Islands =

This article lists political parties in Solomon Islands. Solomon Islands have a multi-party system with numerous political parties.

== Political culture ==
In most elections, no one party has won an absolute majority of seats and so usually parties must work with each other to form coalition governments. The one exception is the 1989 election, when the People's Alliance Party (PAP) led by Solomon Mamaloni did win an absolute majority. However, in late 1990, Mamaloni broke away from the PAP and continued ruling in a coalition government until the 1993 election.

Many parties are established immediately prior to an election and most are very short-lived. Some will achieve no parliamentary representation and dissolve within a year. Others will achieve parliamentary representation but, having served their purpose, are then discarded.

The most enduring political parties in the Solomon Islands are the PAP and the Solomon Islands United Party, founded in 1979 and 1980, respectively. The PAP has led three governments and been in coalition in at least three more. The United Party led two governments in the 1980s however its representation has waned in recent years and after the 2006, it no longer had any parliamentary representatives.

== Active political parties ==
=== Parties represented in parliament ===
Party		Ideology	Leader	MPs
OUR	Ownership, Unity and Responsibility Party	Social conservatism; Christian nationalism	Jeremiah Manele	15 / 50
SIDP	Solomon Islands Democratic Party		Matthew Wale	11 / 50
UP	Solomon Islands United Party		Peter Kenilorea	6 / 50
PFP	People First Party		Jimmie Rodgers	3 / 50
Kadere	Kadere Party	Shipping and logging workers’ interests	Peter Boyers	1 / 50
SIPRA	Solomon Islands Party for Rural Advancement		Gordon Darcy Lilo	1 / 50
U4C	Umi for Change Party	Economic liberalism	Daniel Suidani	1 / 50
DAP	Democratic Alliance Party		Rick Houenipwela	1 / 50

=== Other parties ===
- National Party (Nasnol Pati, c.1997–, founded by Francis Billy Hilly)
- People's Alliance Party (PAP, 1979–, founded by Solomon Mamaloni and David Kausimae through the merger of Mamaloni's People's Progress Party and Kausimae's Rural Alliance Party)
- Solomon Islands Liberal Party (1988–, founded by Bart Ulufa'alu)
- Association of Independent Members (AIM, c.2001–, founded by Tommy Chan)

== Parties created in lead up to 2010 election ==
- Direct Development Party (co-founded by former SICHE Director, Dick Ha’amori, and journalist and former MP, Alfred Sasako)
- New Nations Solomon Islands Party (founded by businessman Belani Tekulu)
- Solomon Islands People’s Congress Party (founded by outgoing Deputy PM, Fred Fono)
- Reform Democratic Party of Solomon Islands (RDP-SI, founded by former MP and Minister Danny Philip)
- Rural Congress People's Party (founded by Rev. Milton Talasasa)
- Ownership, Unity and Responsibility Party (OUR party, co-founded by former PM Manasseh Sogavare and seven other MPs)
- People's Federation Party (founded by former foreign affairs officer Rudolf Henry Dorah; party Chair is Clay Forau Soalaoi, outgoing MP for Temotu Vatud)
- Autonomous Solomon Islanders Party (ASIP, co-founded by former politicians Jackson Sunaone and Denis Lulei)
- Twelve Pillars to Peace and Prosperity Party (TP4, founded by Delma Nori)
- People's Power Action Party (founded by former Honiara Lord Mayor, Robert Wales Feratelia)
- Rural and Urban Political Party (RUPP) (co-founded by outgoing Lands Minister Samuel Manetoali (President) and outgoing MP for South Vella La Vella, Trevor Olavae)
- Christian Progressive Party (CPP)

== Parties created in lead up to 2014 election ==
- Kadere Party
- People First Party (Solomon Islands)
- United Democratic Party (Solomon Islands)

== Parties created in lead up to 2024 election ==
- Umi for Change Party
- Peoples Liberal Democratic Party of Solomon Islands

== Former political parties ==
- Christian Alliance Party (2005–06, founded by Edward Ronia)
- Lafari Party (2005–06, founded by John Garo)
- Solomon Islands Social Credit Party (SoCred, 2006–10, founded by Manasseh Sogavare)
- Solomon One Nation (2005–06, founded by Francis Orodani)
- Solomon First (2005–06, founded by David Kwan)
- People's Progressive Party (PPP, 2001–06, founded by Manasseh Sogavare)
- New Solomons Party (c. 1997)
- Christian Alliance Party of Solomon Islands
- Christian Leadership and Fellowship Group (1993–97, founded by Rev Michael Maeliau)
- Solomon Islands National Unity and Reconciliation Party (SINURP, 1994–97, founded by Solomon Mamaloni whilst he was Prime Minister, after he broke away from the PAP)
- National Action Party of Solomon Islands (NAPSI, 1993–97, founded by Francis Saemala)
- Solomon Islands Labour Party (1988–, founded by Joses Tuhanuku)
- National Front for Progress (NFP, 1989–97, founded by Andrew Nori)
- Solomone Ago Sagefanua (SAS, 1984–89, founded by Sethuel Kelly)
- Solomon Islands Rural Party, later Rural Alliance Party (SIRAP, 1977–79, founded by David Kausimae and Faneta Sira)
- National Democratic Party (NADEPA, 1976–89, founded by Bart Ulufa'alu)
- United Solomon Islands Party Alliance (USIPA, 1973–75, founded by Benedict Kinika)
- People’s Progress Party (PPP, 1973–75, founded by Solomon Mamaloni and David Kausimae)
- Labour Party (1971, founded by Peter Salaka)
- Solomon Islands United Nation Party (SUN, 1968–73, founded by David Kausimae, Frank Wickham and Bill Ramsey)
- Democratic Party (1965–67, founded by Mariano Kelesi and Eric Lawson)
- United Democratic Party (UDP, 1980)

== See also ==
- Elections in Solomon Islands
- Politics of Solomon Islands
