= 8th Parliament of Solomon Islands =

The 8th Parliament of Solomon Islands, determined by the 2006 general election, was the National Parliament of Solomon Islands from 2006 to 2010. It was preceded by the seventh and followed by the ninth.

The 8th Parliament consisted in 50 representatives, elected from 50 single-seat constituencies.

== Party standings ==
The various parties had the following number of seats.

Party	Seats
Association of Independent Members of Parliament	7
Democratic Party	5
Liberal Party	3
National Party	4
Party for Rural Advancement	5
People's Alliance Party	8
Social Credit Party	3
Independents	12
Speaker	1

== Members ==
The following were the 50 members of the National Parliament.

MP	Party	Constituency
Steve William Abana	Democratic	Fataleka
Leslie Boseto	National	South Choiseul
Peter Boyers	AIMP	West New Georgia – Vona Vona
Laurie Chan	People's Alliance	West Guadalcanal
Walter Folotalu	?	Lau Mbaelelea
Fred Fono	People's Alliance	Central Kwara'ae
Bernard Ghiro	AIMP	Central Makira
Seth Gukuna	AIMP	Rennel Bellona
William Ni'i Haomae	Independent	Small Malaita
Francis Billy Hilly	National	Rannogga-Simbo
Edward Huni'ehu	AIMP	East Are'Are
Sam Iduri	Democratic	West Kwara'ae
Toswel Kaua	Rural Advancement	Baegu-Asifola
Allan Kemakeza	People's Alliance	Savo-Russels
Mark Roboliu Kemakeza	Liberal	Gela
Clement Kengava	People's Alliance	Northwest Choiseul
Johnson Koli	People's Alliance	East Guadalcanal
Daniel Enele Kwanairara	AIMP	North Malaita
Nollen Cornelius Leni	National	East Central Guadalcanal
Gordon Darcy Lilo	Rural Advancement	Gizo-Kolombangara
Dr. Derek Sikua	Liberal	North East Guadalcanal
Japhet Waipora	Liberal	West Makira

== Changes in membership ==
The following MPs obtained their seats through by-elections during the term of the 8th Parliament.

- Walter Folotalu was elected MP for Lau Mbaelelea in a by-election on 23 September 2008.
- Manasseh Maelanga was elected MP for East Malaita in a by-election on 27 March 2008.
- Silas Milikada was elected MP for East Honiara in a by-election on 23 September 2008.
- Matthew Cooper Wale was elected MP for Aoke-Langalanga in a by-election on 27 March 2008.
- Peter Shanel Agovaka was re-elected MP for Central Guadalcanal in a by-election on 6 May 2009.
- Allan Kemakeza was re-elected MP for Savo and Russells in a by-election on 29 October 2009. However, in February 2010, the High Court ruled that Allan Kemakeza was ineligible to stand in the by-election and the seat then remained vacant for the remainder of the term of the 8th Parliament.
