= Solomon Islands Alliance for Change =

Political alliance in Solomon Islands

The Solomon Islands Alliance for Change was a political alliance in Solomon Islands, led by the Solomon Islands Liberal Party, which was headed by Bartholomew Ulufa'alu until his death in May 2007.

The SIAC included the National Party, the Solomon Islands Social Credit Party, the Solomon Islands Liberal Party, and the Solomon Islands Party for Rural Advancement.

It was originally called the Solomon Islands Coalition for Change. The name was changed to the Solomon Islands Alliance for Change, or SIAC. It campaigned as the Solomon Islands Alliance for Change Coalition.

It won power in 1997 and began government reform. Manasseh Sogavare was a member, and served as Finance Minister in Ulufa'ulu's Government.

At the legislative elections, 5 December 2001, the alliance won 12 out of 50 seats. At the last elections in April 2006, it also won about 12 seats.
