= Seth Gukuna =

Solomon Islands politician (born 1961)

Seth Gukuna (born August 21, 1961) is a Solomon Islander politician.

== Biography ==
Gukana was born August 21, 1961. He earned a bachelor of science at the University of Waikato in 1987 and a Master of Business Administration at the University of the South Pacific in 1998. Early in his career, he served as the Solomon Islands' ambassador to Taiwan. While serving as ambassador in 2002, he apologized to the Taiwanese Ministry of Foreign Affairs for causing a traffic accident while driving under the influence. He was first elected to Parliament in the 2006 general election to represent a constituency in Rennell and Bellona Province. He was appointed Minister for Culture and Tourism in 2007. He was later appointed Minister of Infrastructure Development.
