= Rural and Urban Political Party =

- Leader: Samuel Manetoali
- Founded: June 2010
- Split from: Solomon Islands Party for Rural Advancement

The Rural and Urban Political Party was a political party in Solomon Islands which contested the 2010 general election.

The party was founded in June 2010 by MP Samuel Manetoali as a split-away from the Party for Rural Advancement. The party's stated policy priorities were economic growth and security. Manetoali called for small business centres to be set up all over the country, along with appropriate infrastructure, to enable local people's participation in business, and stimulate growth.

Manetoali was re-elected in his constituency of Gao-Bugotu, but no other candidate from the party obtained a seat. Manetoali then supported Danny Philip's successful bid for the premiership, and obtained the position of Minister for Tourism and Culture in Philip's Cabinet.

The party contested no other elections and Manetoali himself would run as an independent in 2014.
