= 2006 Solomon Islands general election =

Elections in Solomon Islands

← 2001	5 April 2006	2010 →
- All 50 seats in the National Parliament; 26 seats needed for a majority
Party	Leader	Vote %	Seats
National		6.85	4
SIPRA		6.29	4
People's Alliance	Allan Kemakeza	6.24	3
Democratic		4.88	3
Liberal	Bartholomew Ulufa'alu	4.59	2
Social Credit	Manasseh Sogavare	4.29	2
Lafari		3.19	2
Independents	–	59.89	30
This lists parties that won seats. See the complete results below.
Prime Minister before	Prime Minister after
Allan Kemakeza; People's Alliance	Snyder Rini; Independent

General elections were held in the Solomon Islands on 5 April 2006. No party won more than four of the fifty seats, while thirty seats went to independent candidates. A number of those subsequently formed an Association of Independent Members of Parliament, with Snyder Rini as their leader. Rini was elected prime minister by Parliament on 18 April, amidst "widespread street protests" in Honiara, which caused particular damage in the city's Chinatown. Rioters "alleged corruption and insisted that Mr. Rini had been unfairly favouring Chinese businessmen". While the riots ceased with the arrival of Australian and New Zealand peacekeeping troops the next day, the opposition soon lodged a motion of no confidence in Rini's premiership. Rini resigned on 26 April, having been Prime Minister for just eight days. Opposition parties united in a coalition and succeeded in having Manasseh Sogavare, of the Solomon Islands Social Credit Party, elected Prime Minister on 4 May.

== Conduct ==
Australia sent a ten-member observer delegation to monitor the election, led by Senator Marise Payne, and comprising MPs Bob Sercombe and Michael Ferguson, former Queensland Electoral Commissioner Bob Longland, and six experienced officials from the Departments of Foreign Affairs and Trade, Defence and AusAID. The Australian observer delegation was joined by other international observer teams from New Zealand, Japan, the USA, the Commonwealth Secretariat and the Pacific Islands Forum Secretariat. The United Nations Electoral Assistance Division coordinated the consolidated international observer effort. The international observers' interim assessment said the polling process was transparent and well-conducted, and voters were able to exercise a free and secret vote.

== Results ==
Twenty-six women candidates stood in the election, but none were elected, making the Solomons' Parliament one of the world's few all-male legislatures.

Party	Votes	%	Seats
National Party	13,103	6.85	4
Solomon Islands Party for Rural Advancement	12,030	6.29	4
People's Alliance Party	11,935	6.24	3
Solomon Islands Democratic Party	9,338	4.88	3
Solomon Islands Liberal Party	8,783	4.59	2
Solomon Islands Social Credit Party	8,213	4.29	2
Lafari Party	6,099	3.19	2
Christian Alliance Party	3,613	1.89	0
Solomon Islands Labour Party	1,733	0.91	0
Association of Independent Members	681	0.36	0
Solomon First Political Party	352	0.18	0
Solomon Islands United Party	324	0.17	0
Solomon One Nation Party	274	0.14	0
Independent Democratic	252	0.13	0
Independent	114,591	59.89	30
Total	191,321	100.00	50
Valid votes	191,321	99.16	
Invalid/blank votes	1,627	0.84	
Total votes	192,948	100.00	
Registered voters/turnout	342,119	56.40	
Source: Solomon Islands Election Resources

=== By constituency ===
Results by constituency
Constituency	Electorate	Candidate	Party	Votes	%	Notes
Aoke/Langalanga	7,365	Batholomew Ulufa'alu	Solomon Islands Liberal Party	1,523	34.90	Re-elected
Aoke/Langalanga	7,365	Mathew Cooper Wale	Solomon Islands Democratic Party	1,032	23.60	
Aoke/Langalanga	7,365	Rachel Fera	Independent	555	12.70	
Aoke/Langalanga	7,365	Arthold Matanani	National Party	315	7.20	
Aoke/Langalanga	7,365	Peter Baru	People's Alliance Party	280	6.40	
Aoke/Langalanga	7,365	Abraham Baeanisia	Independent	161	3.70	
Aoke/Langalanga	7,365	Peter Obadae Koti	Independent	138	3.20	
Aoke/Langalanga	7,365	Benjimen Fagasi	Independent	111	2.50	
Aoke/Langalanga	7,365	Sudani Walemae	Independent	61	1.40	
Aoke/Langalanga	7,365	Alfred Polard Ludae	Independent	36	0.80	
Aoke/Langalanga	7,365	Chris Karau	Lafari Party	32	0.70	
Aoke/Langalanga	7,365	John Paul Dio	Independent	31	0.70	
Aoke/Langalanga	7,365	Philip Jack Aru	Independent	30	0.70	
Aoke/Langalanga	7,365	Rejected votes		59	1.40	
Baegu/Asifola	6,975	Toswel Kaua	Solomon Islands Party for Rural Advancement	1,758	41.80	Elected
Baegu/Asifola	6,975	Steve Aumanu	Independent	913	21.70	Unseated
Baegu/Asifola	6,975	Walter Folotalu	Christian Alliance Party	688	16.40	
Baegu/Asifola	6,975	Cornelius Keteau	Lafari Party	475	11.30	
Baegu/Asifola	6,975	George Suri Laufanua	Solomon Islands Liberal Party	350	8.30	
Baegu/Asifola	6,975	Catherine Adifaka	Independent	21	0.50	
Central Guadalcanal	5,089	Peter Shanel Agovaka	Independent	1,124	31.50	Elected
Central Guadalcanal	5,089	Walton Naezol	Independent	966	27.10	Unseated
Central Guadalcanal	5,089	Noveti Napter	Independent	490	13.70	
Central Guadalcanal	5,089	Wilson Weston Suhara	Lafari Party	467	13.10	
Central Guadalcanal	5,089	Whitlam Kikolo	Independent	300	8.40	
Central Guadalcanal	5,089	Simon Tonavi	Solomon Islands Party for Rural Advancement	163	4.60	
Central Guadalcanal	5,089	Paul Berry Voromate	Independent	39	1.10	
Central Guadalcanal	5,089	Rejected votes		21	0.60	
Central Honiara	19,539	Nelson Ne'e	Independent	1,644	25.30	Elected
Central Honiara	19,539	John Moffat Fugui	Independent	1,283	19.70	
Central Honiara	19,539	Meshach Maebiru Maetoloa	Independent	1,095	16.80	Unseated
Central Honiara	19,539	Wayne Maepio	Independent	627	9.60	
Central Honiara	19,539	Delmah Lavina Nori	Independent	535	8.20	
Central Honiara	19,539	Moon Pin Kwan	Independent	447	6.90	
Central Honiara	19,539	Josephine Teakeni	Independent	352	5.40	
Central Honiara	19,539	Geoffrey Alacky	Independent	292	4.50	
Central Honiara	19,539	Eric Kwalai	Independent	44	0.70	
Central Honiara	19,539	Quinzy Darcy	Independent	32	0.50	
Central Honiara	19,539	Simone Geatavem Lifa	Independent	28	0.40	
Central Honiara	19,539	John Geoffrey Kevisi	Independent	27	0.40	
Central Honiara	19,539	Miriam Garo	Independent	21	0.30	
Central Honiara	19,539	Rejected votes		78	1.20	
Central Kwara'ae	8,977	Fred Iro Fono	People's Alliance Party	2,802	54.50	Re-elected
Central Kwara'ae	8,977	Richard Na'amo Irosaea	National Party	2,288	44.50	
Central Kwara'ae	8,977	Rejected votes		54	1.00	
Central Makira	4,722	Bernard Ghiro	Lafari Party	877	26.80	Re-elected
Central Makira	4,722	Johnson Taisae Sunaone	Independent	443	13.50	
Central Makira	4,722	Clement Kirari	Solomon Islands Liberal Party	396	12.10	
Central Makira	4,722	George Alfred Kuper	Independent	341	10.40	
Central Makira	4,722	Fredson Fenua	Solomon Islands Social Credit Party	292	8.90	
Central Makira	4,722	Allen Ngariniuki Campbell	Independent	249	7.60	
Central Makira	4,722	Andrew Mua	National Party	170	5.20	
Central Makira	4,722	Gad Hagasuramo	Independent	119	3.60	
Central Makira	4,722	Benedict Tahi	Independent	112	3.40	
Central Makira	4,722	James Mua Rafe	Independent	87	2.70	
Central Makira	4,722	Stanley Waisi Tageahoro	Independent	80	2.40	
Central Makira	4,722	Edward Haui	Independent	48	1.50	
Central Makira	4,722	Rejected votes		56	1.70	
East ꞌAreꞌare	5,235	Edward Huniehu	Independent	882	26.20	Re-elected
East ꞌAreꞌare	5,235	Michael Ahikau	Solomon Islands Democratic Party	726	21.60	
East ꞌAreꞌare	5,235	Abraham Namokari	Independent	497	14.80	
East ꞌAreꞌare	5,235	Dickson Warakohia	Independent	489	14.50	
East ꞌAreꞌare	5,235	Peter Maeatua	National Party	390	11.60	
East ꞌAreꞌare	5,235	Francis Hoasipua	People's Alliance Party	135	4.00	
East ꞌAreꞌare	5,235	Michael Wairamo	Independent	101	3.00	
East ꞌAreꞌare	5,235	Alphonsus Nori	Independent	77	2.30	
East ꞌAreꞌare	5,235	Jezreel Loaloa	Independent	59	1.80	
East ꞌAreꞌare	5,235	Jerry Haipora Terenihona	Independent	10	0.30	
East Central Guadalcanal	5,896	Nollen C. Leni	Independent	984	23.20	Re-elected
East Central Guadalcanal	5,896	Gordon Tapalia	Independent	799	18.80	
East Central Guadalcanal	5,896	Hilda Thugea Kari	Independent	655	15.40	
East Central Guadalcanal	5,896	John Gela	Solomon Islands Social Credit Party	577	13.60	
East Central Guadalcanal	5,896	Benjamin Savino	Independent	377	8.90	
East Central Guadalcanal	5,896	Nathaniel Mara	Solomon Islands Democratic Party	294	6.90	
East Central Guadalcanal	5,896	Jamie Lency Vokia	Independent	269	6.30	
East Central Guadalcanal	5,896	John Selwyn Besa'A	Independent	261	6.10	
East Central Guadalcanal	5,896	Johnson Meshach Villia	Solomon Islands Labour Party	30	0.70	
East Choiseul	4,028	Mannaseh Sogavare	Solomon Islands Social Credit Party	854	35.70	Re-elected
East Choiseul	4,028	Francis Qalokamake	People's Alliance Party	646	27.00	
East Choiseul	4,028	Gordon Volaka	National Party	371	15.50	
East Choiseul	4,028	Moses Kurebose Biliki	Independent	355	14.80	
East Choiseul	4,028	Billy Takubala	Independent	136	5.70	
East Choiseul	4,028	Rejected votes		32	1.30	
East Guadalcanal	6,212	Johnson Koli	Independent	1,172	34.60	Re-elected
East Guadalcanal	6,212	Fred Laku	Independent	571	16.90	
East Guadalcanal	6,212	Bendick Tova	Solomon Islands Party for Rural Advancement	568	16.80	
East Guadalcanal	6,212	Joseph Hikuta'a	Solomon Islands Social Credit Party	493	14.60	
East Guadalcanal	6,212	John Marahare	Independent	280	8.30	
East Guadalcanal	6,212	Shaniella Talasifera	Solomon Islands Liberal Party	153	4.50	
East Guadalcanal	6,212	Rejected votes		150	4.40	
East Honiara	30,060	Charles Dausabea	Independent	1,892	23.00	Elected
East Honiara	30,060	Simeon Bouro	Independent	1,232	15.00	Unseated
East Honiara	30,060	Edward Jacob Ronia	Independent	1,110	13.50	
East Honiara	30,060	George Mamimu	Independent	1,026	12.50	
East Honiara	30,060	Jack Donga	Independent	514	6.20	
East Honiara	30,060	Dominic Tata	Independent	466	5.70	
East Honiara	30,060	Ronald Ila Fugui	Independent	443	5.40	
East Honiara	30,060	Samuel Maesatana	Independent	210	2.50	
East Honiara	30,060	Dickson Waimora	Independent	204	2.50	
East Honiara	30,060	Wilson B. Karamui	Independent	202	2.50	
East Honiara	30,060	Robert Wales Feraltelia	Solomon Islands Liberal Party	176	2.10	
East Honiara	30,060	Francis Ramoifuila	Independent	151	1.80	
East Honiara	30,060	John Maetia Kaliuae	Independent	90	1.10	
East Honiara	30,060	Paul Kakai	Independent	71	0.90	
East Honiara	30,060	Gabriel Taloikwai	Independent	68	0.80	
East Honiara	30,060	Peter Usi	Independent	63	0.80	
East Honiara	30,060	Fred Binta Talafunu	Independent	47	0.60	
East Honiara	30,060	Elson Maetia Hilly	Independent	46	0.60	
East Honiara	30,060	Saxon Talo	Independent	42	0.50	
East Honiara	30,060	Edwin Sitori Nanau	Independent	24	0.30	
East Honiara	30,060	Rejected votes		162	2.00	
East Kwaio	8,856	Stanley Festus Sofu	Solomon Islands Democratic Party	1,557	33.70	Elected
East Kwaio	8,856	Senda Fifi	Independent	849	18.40	
East Kwaio	8,856	Billy Abae	National Party	701	15.20	
East Kwaio	8,856	Alfred Solomon Sasako	Lafari Party	652	14.10	Unseated
East Kwaio	8,856	Delson Wane Safa'a	People's Alliance Party	475	10.30	
East Kwaio	8,856	Henry Faasifoabae	Independent	226	4.90	
East Kwaio	8,856	Nelson Richard Isika	Solomon Islands Social Credit Party	163	3.50	
East Makira	6,805	David Sitai	Independent	1,240	25.30	Re-elected
East Makira	6,805	Alfred Ghiro	Independent	1,132	23.10	
East Makira	6,805	Fred P. Fanua	Independent	579	11.80	
East Makira	6,805	Doreen Ysabel Kuper	Independent	567	11.60	
East Makira	6,805	George Kuata	Independent	488	10.00	
East Makira	6,805	Warren Tereqora	Independent	324	6.60	
East Makira	6,805	Daniel Dannah Nahusu	Independent	301	6.20	
East Makira	6,805	Stanley S. Siapu	Independent	200	4.10	
East Makira	6,805	Francis Tagua	Independent	62	1.30	
East Malaita	6,379	Joses Wawari Sanga	National Party	1,601	45.30	Re-elected
East Malaita	6,379	Afu Lia Billy	Solomon Islands Democratic Party	738	20.90	
East Malaita	6,379	Alfred Maetia	Solomon Islands Social Credit Party	583	16.50	
East Malaita	6,379	Chris Maebiru	Independent	254	7.20	
East Malaita	6,379	Nation Sia Saelea	Solomon Islands United Party	178	5.00	
East Malaita	6,379	Robert Nathan Mautai	People's Alliance Party	119	3.40	
East Malaita	6,379	Eddie Misitee Leanafaka	Solomon Islands Liberal Party	6	0.20	
East Malaita	6,379	Rejected votes		57	1.60	
Fataleka	6,586	Steve William Abana	Independent	1,056	26.00	Elected
Fataleka	6,586	Felix Taloinao Laumae Kabini	Independent	989	24.40	
Fataleka	6,586	Gabriel Kaula	Independent	684	16.90	
Fataleka	6,586	Casper Cassidy Luiramo	Independent	574	14.20	Unseated
Fataleka	6,586	Andy Tony Tosasai	Independent	143	3.50	
Fataleka	6,586	Wilson Maemae	People's Alliance Party	143	3.50	
Fataleka	6,586	David Siau	Lafari Party	127	3.10	
Fataleka	6,586	George Paul Fia	Independent	122	3.00	
Fataleka	6,586	Hendry Ra'aga	Independent	46	1.10	
Fataleka	6,586	Alice Kakabu Baekalia	Solomon Islands United Party	37	0.90	
Fataleka	6,586	Catherine Leta	Solomon Islands Liberal Party	34	0.80	
Fataleka	6,586	Samuel Ifuna'au	Independent	28	0.70	
Fataleka	6,586	Patrick Uma	Independent	17	0.40	
Fataleka	6,586	George Abana Sanga	Solomon Islands Party for Rural Advancement	13	0.30	
Fataleka	6,586	Billy Dauma	Independent	1	0.00	
Fataleka	6,586	Rejected votes		41	1.00	
Gao/Bugotu	4,758	Samuel Manetoali	Solomon Islands Party for Rural Advancement	978	31.60	Elected
Gao/Bugotu	4,758	Basil Manelegua	Independent	306	9.90	Unseated
Gao/Bugotu	4,758	Nathaniel Supa	Independent	301	9.70	
Gao/Bugotu	4,758	Warren B Sikilabu	Independent	268	8.70	
Gao/Bugotu	4,758	Edmund Bourne Gagahe	National Party	234	7.60	
Gao/Bugotu	4,758	Trasel Gilbert	Independent	202	6.50	
Gao/Bugotu	4,758	Eric Notere	People's Alliance Party	178	5.80	
Gao/Bugotu	4,758	Nicholas Lolita	Independent	171	5.50	
Gao/Bugotu	4,758	Doris Bava	Independent	97	3.10	
Gao/Bugotu	4,758	John Patteson Bako	Independent	97	3.10	
Gao/Bugotu	4,758	William Manepolo	Independent	74	2.40	
Gao/Bugotu	4,758	Ian Aujare	Independent	54	1.70	
Gao/Bugotu	4,758	Nathaniel Gudfraede	Independent	42	1.40	
Gao/Bugotu	4,758	John Salano	Independent	34	1.10	
Gao/Bugotu	4,758	Ambrose H Bugotu	Independent	11	0.40	
Gao/Bugotu	4,758	Rejected votes		47	1.50	
Gizo/Kolombangara	7,628	Gordon Darcy Lilo	Solomon Islands Party for Rural Advancement	1,810	45.70	Re-elected
Gizo/Kolombangara	7,628	Chachabule Amoi	Independent	726	18.30	
Gizo/Kolombangara	7,628	Stephen Suti-Agalo	Solomon Islands Liberal Party	519	13.10	
Gizo/Kolombangara	7,628	Jackson Piasi	Solomon Islands Labour Party	408	10.30	
Gizo/Kolombangara	7,628	Vainga Taniera Tion	Independent	323	8.20	
Gizo/Kolombangara	7,628	Demetrius Tarabangara Piziki	Independent	143	3.60	
Gizo/Kolombangara	7,628	Rejected votes		33	0.80	
Hograno/Kia/Havulei	4,861	Selwyn Riumana	Independent	937	27.40	Elected
Hograno/Kia/Havulei	4,861	Dick Daoleni	Independent	541	15.80	
Hograno/Kia/Havulei	4,861	Jane Magata Tozaka	Independent	507	14.80	
Hograno/Kia/Havulei	4,861	Nelson Kehe Kile	Independent	449	13.10	Unseated
Hograno/Kia/Havulei	4,861	Luke Layman Eta	Solomon Islands Social Credit Party	298	8.70	
Hograno/Kia/Havulei	4,861	Johnson Leamana	Solomon Islands Democratic Party	237	6.90	
Hograno/Kia/Havulei	4,861	Cornelius Rathamana	Independent	199	5.80	
Hograno/Kia/Havulei	4,861	Jason B Leguhavi	Independent	177	5.20	
Hograno/Kia/Havulei	4,861	Charles Misari Ravinago	Independent	36	1.10	
Hograno/Kia/Havulei	4,861	Rejected votes		37	1.10	
Lau/Mbaelelea	12,136	Bentley Samuel Rogosomani	Independent	1,546	22.20	Elected
Lau/Mbaelelea	12,136	Judson Lee Leafasia	Independent	1,246	17.90	
Lau/Mbaelelea	12,136	Francis Maaka	Solomon Islands Liberal Party	1,072	15.40	
Lau/Mbaelelea	12,136	Paul Maenu'u	Solomon Islands Liberal Party	1,045	15.00	Unseated
Lau/Mbaelelea	12,136	Charles Ferania Sale	National Party	762	10.90	
Lau/Mbaelelea	12,136	John Beui Lamani	Independent	304	4.40	
Lau/Mbaelelea	12,136	Aaron Rubin Olofia	Independent	290	4.20	
Lau/Mbaelelea	12,136	Peter Satu	Solomon Islands Social Credit Party	177	2.50	
Lau/Mbaelelea	12,136	Toata Molea	Independent	150	2.20	
Lau/Mbaelelea	12,136	Philip Oeta	Independent	138	2.00	
Lau/Mbaelelea	12,136	Hedley Aluta Toata	Independent	77	1.10	
Lau/Mbaelelea	12,136	Duddley Wate	Independent	69	1.00	
Lau/Mbaelelea	12,136	Frederick Taloimatakwa	Independent	44	0.60	
Lau/Mbaelelea	12,136	William R. Garaema	Independent	32	0.50	
Lau/Mbaelelea	12,136	Luke Tome	Independent	10	0.10	
Malaita Outer Islands	2,345	Patrick Vahoe	Independent	352	27.00	Elected
Malaita Outer Islands	2,345	David Holosivi	Independent	299	22.90	Unseated
Malaita Outer Islands	2,345	Reginald W Aipia	Independent	175	13.40	
Malaita Outer Islands	2,345	Davidson Alaki Poula	Independent	140	10.70	
Malaita Outer Islands	2,345	Levi Apuna	Independent	94	7.20	
Malaita Outer Islands	2,345	Henry Manuhea	Independent	93	7.10	
Malaita Outer Islands	2,345	Gabriel Kemaiki	Independent	69	5.30	
Malaita Outer Islands	2,345	John Apo	Independent	59	4.50	
Malaita Outer Islands	2,345	Rejected votes		25	1.90	
Maringe/Kokota	4,989	Varian Lonamei	Independent	1,297	35.30	Elected
Maringe/Kokota	4,989	Ruben Dotho	Independent	928	25.30	
Maringe/Kokota	4,989	Charles De Fox	Solomon Islands Party for Rural Advancement	499	13.60	
Maringe/Kokota	4,989	Clement Rojumana	People's Alliance Party	242	6.60	Unseated
Maringe/Kokota	4,989	Dave Bale	National Party	167	4.50	
Maringe/Kokota	4,989	Elizabeth Theodi	Independent	124	3.40	
Maringe/Kokota	4,989	Arnold Iru	Solomon Islands Democratic Party	121	3.30	
Maringe/Kokota	4,989	Gregory Frank Koutini	Independent	117	3.20	
Maringe/Kokota	4,989	Wilson Hane Sedere	Independent	114	3.10	
Maringe/Kokota	4,989	Caroline Hebala Maetia	Solomon Islands United Party	35	1.00	
Maringe/Kokota	4,989	Rejected votes		31	0.80	
Marovo	7,690	Snyder Rini	Independent	1,441	28.70	Re-elected
Marovo	7,690	Steven Veno	Independent	1,133	22.60	
Marovo	7,690	Duddley Hirata	Independent	971	19.30	
Marovo	7,690	Sam Patavangara	Independent	710	14.10	
Marovo	7,690	Lore Reuben	Independent	438	8.70	
Marovo	7,690	Spama Runialo Sialo	Independent	252	5.00	
Marovo	7,690	Albert Solomon	Independent	79	1.60	
Nggela	10,378	Mark Roboliu Kemakeza	Independent	1,534	22.00	Elected
Nggela	10,378	Frank Bollen Pule	People's Alliance Party	1,432	20.50	Unseated
Nggela	10,378	Martin Mata	Independent	894	12.80	
Nggela	10,378	Ambrose Siau	Independent	611	8.80	
Nggela	10,378	Gordon Mara	Independent	584	8.40	
Nggela	10,378	Charles Fox Manebona	Independent	528	7.60	
Nggela	10,378	John Steward Visivisi	Solomon Islands Social Credit Party	423	6.10	
Nggela	10,378	David Kwan	Solomon First Political Party	352	5.00	
Nggela	10,378	John Smith Tokasi	Independent	264	3.80	
Nggela	10,378	Daniel A. Parapolo	Independent	158	2.30	
Nggela	10,378	Alphonsus Selofae	Independent	100	1.40	
Nggela	10,378	Nolland Jolo	Solomon Islands Liberal Party	64	0.90	
Nggela	10,378	Cecil Ono	People's Alliance Party	38	0.50	
North East Guadalcanal	5,616	Derek Sikua	Independent	1,382	35.60	Elected
North East Guadalcanal	5,616	Ishmael Robert Leuape	Solomon Islands Social Credit Party	449	11.60	
North East Guadalcanal	5,616	Stephen Paeni	Independent	443	11.40	Unseated
North East Guadalcanal	5,616	Maleli Zalao	Solomon Islands Party for Rural Advancement	351	9.10	
North East Guadalcanal	5,616	Gabriel Leua Lovanitila	Independent	268	6.90	
North East Guadalcanal	5,616	Gordon Leua	Christian Alliance Party	248	6.40	
North East Guadalcanal	5,616	Leadley Qena	Independent	237	6.10	
North East Guadalcanal	5,616	John Tome	Independent	234	6.00	
North East Guadalcanal	5,616	John Tatahu	Independent	138	3.60	
North East Guadalcanal	5,616	Samuel Ono Vaka	Independent	127	3.30	
North Guadalcanal	3,928	Martin Sopage	Independent	788	27.70	Elected
North Guadalcanal	3,928	Edmond Rukale	People's Alliance Party	482	17.00	Unseated
North Guadalcanal	3,928	Stephen Panga	Independent	442	15.50	
North Guadalcanal	3,928	Eliam Tangirongo	Christian Alliance Party	404	14.20	
North Guadalcanal	3,928	Samson Maneka	Independent	390	13.70	
North Guadalcanal	3,928	Benjiman Kelly	Independent	211	7.40	
North Guadalcanal	3,928	Catherine Kakamo	Solomon Islands Party for Rural Advancement	65	2.30	
North Guadalcanal	3,928	Stephen Kulagani	Lafari Party	29	1.00	
North Guadalcanal	3,928	Rejected votes		32	1.10	
North Malaita	9,238	Daniel E. Kwanairara	Lafari Party	2,292	41.60	Re-elected
North Malaita	9,238	Michael Maeliau	Independent	1,487	27.00	
North Malaita	9,238	Michael Iro	People's Alliance Party	478	8.70	
North Malaita	9,238	Ronnie Faiga	Independent	474	8.60	
North Malaita	9,238	Jemuel William Liobana	Independent	413	7.50	
North Malaita	9,238	Benjamin Laefanaomea Riiga	Independent	221	4.00	
North Malaita	9,238	Starling Daefa	Solomon Islands Democratic Party	118	2.10	
North Malaita	9,238	George Walenenea	National Party	22	0.40	
North Malaita	9,238	Moffat Stephen Ganisua	Solomon Islands United Party	9	0.20	
North New Georgia	2,448	Job Dudley Tausinga	Solomon Islands Party for Rural Advancement	—	—	Re-elected unopposed
North Vella Lavella	2,930	Milner Tozaka	Independent	573	26.40	Elected
North Vella Lavella	2,930	Danny Bula	Association of Independent Members	571	26.30	Unseated
North Vella Lavella	2,930	Iodine Panasasa	National Party	285	13.10	
North Vella Lavella	2,930	Pye Robert Kuve	Independent	262	12.10	
North Vella Lavella	2,930	Lepesi Paul Jama	Independent	235	10.80	
North Vella Lavella	2,930	Billy Maelagi	Solomon Islands Party for Rural Advancement	217	10.00	
North Vella Lavella	2,930	Rejected votes		28	1.30	
North West Choiseul	6,239	Clement Pikabatu Kengava	People's Alliance Party	1,271	31.40	Re-elected
North West Choiseul	6,239	Jerold Simmy Vazarabatu	Independent	722	17.80	
North West Choiseul	6,239	John Ridd Kure	Solomon Islands Social Credit Party	611	15.10	
North West Choiseul	6,239	Alpha Kimata	Independent	571	14.10	
North West Choiseul	6,239	Luke Pitakoe	Independent	470	11.60	
North West Choiseul	6,239	William Pita Kutinikolo	Independent	241	5.90	
North West Choiseul	6,239	Gabby Taniveke	Independent	117	2.90	
North West Choiseul	6,239	Rejected votes		51	1.30	
North West Guadalcanal	5,525	Siriako Usa	Independent	1,028	29.10	Re-elected
North West Guadalcanal	5,525	Joseph Pali Neilsen	Solomon Islands Party for Rural Advancement	803	22.70	
North West Guadalcanal	5,525	David Sali	Independent	590	16.70	
North West Guadalcanal	5,525	Richard Selwyn Baokosu	Solomon Islands Democratic Party	456	12.90	
North West Guadalcanal	5,525	Doreen Maeke	Independent	181	5.10	
North West Guadalcanal	5,525	Japhet Voselau	Solomon Islands Liberal Party	175	5.00	
North West Guadalcanal	5,525	Francis Orodani	Solomon One Nation Party	164	4.60	
North West Guadalcanal	5,525	Kanuto Kobi	Independent	81	2.30	
North West Guadalcanal	5,525	Bernadette Tadakusu	Independent	44	1.20	
North West Guadalcanal	5,525	Gordon Billy Gatu	Independent	12	0.30	
Ranongga/Simbo	5,197	Francis Billy Hilly	National Party	1,098	33.00	Re-elected
Ranongga/Simbo	5,197	Jimmy Sendersley	Independent	1,024	30.80	
Ranongga/Simbo	5,197	Reuben Lilo	Independent	738	22.20	
Ranongga/Simbo	5,197	Jay Hong	Christian Alliance Party	288	8.70	
Ranongga/Simbo	5,197	Charles Kelly	Independent	94	2.80	
Ranongga/Simbo	5,197	Pelopi Tada Lomae	Solomon Islands Social Credit Party	42	1.30	
Ranongga/Simbo	5,197	Rejected votes		45	1.40	
Rennell/Bellona	3,155	Seth Gukuna	Independent	431	25.00	Elected
Rennell/Bellona	3,155	Charlie Tango	Independent	307	17.80	
Rennell/Bellona	3,155	Joses Taungenga Tuhanuku	Solomon Islands Labour Party	262	15.20	Unseated
Rennell/Bellona	3,155	Lence R. Tagosia	Independent	248	14.40	
Rennell/Bellona	3,155	Chard-Richard Maui Hatingongo	Solomon Islands Party for Rural Advancement	163	9.40	
Rennell/Bellona	3,155	Saueha Joses Tahua	Independent	145	8.40	
Rennell/Bellona	3,155	Ajilon J. Nasiu	Independent	100	5.80	
Rennell/Bellona	3,155	T. Tuhenua	Independent	55	3.20	
Rennell/Bellona	3,155	Rejected votes		15	0.90	
Russells/Savo	6,954	Allan Kemakeza	People's Alliance Party	1,310	30.00	Re-elected
Russells/Savo	6,954	Reginald Hill Kokili	Independent	1,055	24.10	
Russells/Savo	6,954	Stanley S Manetiva	Solomon Islands Democratic Party	806	18.40	
Russells/Savo	6,954	Christopher Narasia	Solomon Islands Social Credit Party	359	8.20	
Russells/Savo	6,954	Tony Kagovai	Solomon Islands Labour Party	313	7.20	
Russells/Savo	6,954	Peter Damien Tura	Independent	288	6.60	
Russells/Savo	6,954	Leotina Kikitu	National Party	177	4.00	
Russells/Savo	6,954	Nivardo Tuanikebu	Solomon Islands Liberal Party	64	1.50	
Shortland	2,556	Augustine Taneko	Independent	592	32.90	Re-elected
Shortland	2,556	Albert Bakale Laore	Solomon Islands Party for Rural Advancement	340	18.90	
Shortland	2,556	James Laore	Independent	253	14.00	
Shortland	2,556	Queensland Olega	Christian Alliance Party	197	10.90	
Shortland	2,556	Michael Kalanuma	Independent	190	10.50	
Shortland	2,556	John Alisae B.	Independent	122	6.80	
Shortland	2,556	Steve Laore	Independent	86	4.80	
Shortland	2,556	Rejected votes		22	1.20	
Small Malaita	9,557	William Nii Haomae	Independent	1,179	19.80	Elected
Small Malaita	9,557	Matthew Fakaia	Solomon Islands Party for Rural Advancement	1,016	17.10	
Small Malaita	9,557	Wallen Hite	Independent	722	12.20	
Small Malaita	9,557	Elizah Owa	Independent	687	11.60	
Small Malaita	9,557	Peter Nikae	National Party	647	10.90	
Small Malaita	9,557	Timothy Laesanau	Solomon Islands Democratic Party	464	7.80	
Small Malaita	9,557	John Pipi Susupuri	Solomon Islands Social Credit Party	375	6.30	
Small Malaita	9,557	James Honimae	Independent	267	4.50	
Small Malaita	9,557	Rose Paohu	Christian Alliance Party	245	4.10	
Small Malaita	9,557	James Hoilopo	Solomon Islands Liberal Party	158	2.70	
Small Malaita	9,557	Walter Hikumane	Independent	130	2.20	
Small Malaita	9,557	Rejected votes		50	0.80	
South Choiseul	5,440	Leslie Boseto	National Party	1,037	33.30	Re-elected
South Choiseul	5,440	Jerry Pitisopa	Solomon Islands Liberal Party	825	26.50	
South Choiseul	5,440	Robertson Erere Galokale	Independent	588	18.90	
South Choiseul	5,440	Elizah Doro Muala	Solomon Islands Social Credit Party	548	17.60	
South Choiseul	5,440	Randall Biliki	Independent	81	2.60	
South Choiseul	5,440	Rejected votes		39	1.30	
South Guadalcanal	4,993	David Day Pacha	Solomon Islands Democratic Party	656	21.20	Elected
South Guadalcanal	4,993	Sethuel Kelly	Independent	626	20.30	
South Guadalcanal	4,993	Michael Voli	Independent	336	10.90	
South Guadalcanal	4,993	Joshua Karichi	Solomon Islands Labour Party	304	9.80	
South Guadalcanal	4,993	Victor Totu	Independent Democratic	252	8.20	Unseated
South Guadalcanal	4,993	Charles Aiwosuga Cheka'a	Solomon Islands Liberal Party	219	7.10	
South Guadalcanal	4,993	Rollen Seleso	Independent	155	5.00	
South Guadalcanal	4,993	Shadrack Sese	Independent	150	4.90	
South Guadalcanal	4,993	Ron Lawson Meke	People's Alliance Party	133	4.30	
South Guadalcanal	4,993	Karnol Kalea Sala	Association of Independent Members	110	3.60	
South Guadalcanal	4,993	Francis Peter Para	Solomon Islands Party for Rural Advancement	74	2.40	
South Guadalcanal	4,993	Terry Vekea	Independent	51	1.70	
South Guadalcanal	4,993	Isaac Leslie Tagu	Independent	22	0.70	
South Guadalcanal	4,993	Rejected votes		0	0.00	
South New Georgia/Rendova/Tetepari	5,475	Francis John Zama	Independent	1,528	40.30	Re-elected
South New Georgia/Rendova/Tetepari	5,475	Danny Philip	Solomon Islands Party for Rural Advancement	1,437	37.90	
South New Georgia/Rendova/Tetepari	5,475	Osborn Vangana	Solomon Islands Democratic Party	585	15.40	
South New Georgia/Rendova/Tetepari	5,475	Douglas Aleke Semi	National Party	123	3.20	
South New Georgia/Rendova/Tetepari	5,475	Lawry Eddie Wickham	Independent	101	2.70	
South New Georgia/Rendova/Tetepari	5,475	Rejected votes		13	0.30	
South Vella Lavella	4,249	Trevor Olavae	Independent	1,655	57.10	Re-elected
South Vella Lavella	4,249	Robins Mesepitu	Christian Alliance Party	923	31.80	
South Vella Lavella	4,249	Milton Mitau	Independent	179	6.20	
South Vella Lavella	4,249	Seth G. Lekelalu	Solomon Islands Party for Rural Advancement	120	4.10	
South Vella Lavella	4,249	Rejected votes		22	0.80	
Temotu Nende	6,677	John Patterson Oti	National Party	1,114	26.10	Re-elected
Temotu Nende	6,677	Edward Daiwo	Solomon Islands Liberal Party	977	22.90	
Temotu Nende	6,677	Ataban M Tropa	Independent	502	11.70	
Temotu Nende	6,677	Noel Keniano	Christian Alliance Party	438	10.30	
Temotu Nende	6,677	Luke Memua	Solomon Islands Party for Rural Advancement	403	9.40	
Temotu Nende	6,677	Simon Peter Meioko	Independent	401	9.40	
Temotu Nende	6,677	George Henry Malirbaal	Solomon Islands Social Credit Party	301	7.00	
Temotu Nende	6,677	John Ini Lapli	Solomon Islands Democratic Party	137	3.20	
Temotu Pele	4,250	Martin Teddy Magga	Independent	877	33.00	Elected
Temotu Pele	4,250	Michael Maina	Independent	766	28.80	Unseated
Temotu Pele	4,250	Jasper M. Bonie	Solomon Islands Social Credit Party	483	18.20	
Temotu Pele	4,250	Ross Hepworth	Independent	309	11.60	
Temotu Pele	4,250	Barnabas Bolam Nimelie	Independent	165	6.20	
Temotu Pele	4,250	Simon Peter Leinga	Independent	44	1.70	
Temotu Pele	4,250	Rejected votes		17	0.60	
Temotu Vatud	3,152	Clay Forau Soalaoi	Solomon Islands Social Credit Party	421	19.90	Elected
Temotu Vatud	3,152	Jeffrey Teava	Independent	372	17.60	Unseated
Temotu Vatud	3,152	Samuel Kafukese	Independent	351	16.60	
Temotu Vatud	3,152	Alfred Ramsey Napeaurua	Independent	292	13.80	
Temotu Vatud	3,152	Gordon H. Bila	Independent	253	12.00	
Temotu Vatud	3,152	Michael Meone	People's Alliance Party	179	8.50	
Temotu Vatud	3,152	Afetama Steven Torro	Independent	113	5.30	
Temotu Vatud	3,152	Moffat Aloha	Christian Alliance Party	63	3.00	
Temotu Vatud	3,152	Rejected votes		71	3.40	
Ulawa/Ugi	3,182	James Tora	Independent	497	22.90	Re-elected
Ulawa/Ugi	3,182	Carl Warren Beldon	Independent	381	17.60	
Ulawa/Ugi	3,182	John Douglas Teaitala	Independent	358	16.50	
Ulawa/Ugi	3,182	Andrew Mamau	Independent	294	13.50	
Ulawa/Ugi	3,182	Meffrey Awao	Independent	174	8.00	
Ulawa/Ugi	3,182	Stanley Mamanu	Independent	170	7.80	
Ulawa/Ugi	3,182	Brook H. Walalau	Independent	152	7.00	
Ulawa/Ugi	3,182	Daniel Ho'ota	Independent	56	2.60	
Ulawa/Ugi	3,182	Charles Ureie Lalasi	Independent	32	1.50	
Ulawa/Ugi	3,182	Henry Ha'aina	Independent	29	1.30	
Ulawa/Ugi	3,182	George Pahili	Independent	11	0.50	
Ulawa/Ugi	3,182	Rejected votes		16	0.70	
West ꞌAreꞌare	5,374	Severino Nuaiasi	Independent	829	24.60	Elected
West ꞌAreꞌare	5,374	Alfred Hairiu	Independent	602	17.90	Unseated
West ꞌAreꞌare	5,374	Lawrence Hunumeme	Independent	478	14.20	
West ꞌAreꞌare	5,374	Andrew Nori	Independent	339	10.10	
West ꞌAreꞌare	5,374	Alice A. Pollard	Independent	322	9.60	
West ꞌAreꞌare	5,374	Aloysio Ma'ahanoa	Independent	304	9.00	
West ꞌAreꞌare	5,374	John Naitoro	Independent	282	8.40	
West ꞌAreꞌare	5,374	Joe Timothy Ariaria	Independent	143	4.20	
West ꞌAreꞌare	5,374	Moses Ramo	Independent	23	0.70	
West ꞌAreꞌare	5,374	Rejected votes		44	1.30	
West Guadalcanal	4,633	Laurie Chan	Independent	1,042	30.00	Re-elected
West Guadalcanal	4,633	Moses Garu	Independent	611	17.60	
West Guadalcanal	4,633	Pascal Belamataga	Solomon Islands Social Credit Party	497	14.30	
West Guadalcanal	4,633	George Kejoa	National Party	395	11.40	
West Guadalcanal	4,633	Joseph Solomon Anea	Independent	343	9.90	
West Guadalcanal	4,633	Kamilo Teke	People's Alliance Party	311	8.90	
West Guadalcanal	4,633	Titus Sura	Solomon Islands Democratic Party	114	3.30	
West Guadalcanal	4,633	Philip G. Manakako	Solomon One Nation Party	110	3.20	
West Guadalcanal	4,633	Rejected votes		52	1.50	
West Honiara	13,128	Isaac Inoke Tosika	Independent	832	27.10	Elected
West Honiara	13,128	Sarah Lolana Dyer	Independent	641	20.80	
West Honiara	13,128	David Puia Tuhanuku	Independent	322	10.50	
West Honiara	13,128	Yukio Sato	Independent	320	10.40	Unseated
West Honiara	13,128	Casper Muna Tofimao	Independent	290	9.40	
West Honiara	13,128	Francis Kairi	Independent	188	6.10	
West Honiara	13,128	Malachi Mekano	Independent	187	6.10	
West Honiara	13,128	Derold Hatigeva	Independent	128	4.20	
West Honiara	13,128	Joe Racket Waihahoi'Asu	Independent	67	2.20	
West Honiara	13,128	Henry Ta'Akihenua Teho	Independent	59	1.90	
West Honiara	13,128	Rejected votes		41	1.30	
West Kwaio	5,786	Peter Tom	Independent	1,023	25.40	Elected
West Kwaio	5,786	George Luialamo	People's Alliance Party	745	18.50	
West Kwaio	5,786	John Martin Garo	Lafari Party	715	17.70	Unseated
West Kwaio	5,786	Mathias Olofia	National Party	682	16.90	
West Kwaio	5,786	Lloyd Gwee Toribaeko	Solomon Islands Social Credit Party	267	6.60	
West Kwaio	5,786	Patricia Mae Samdalu	Solomon Islands Labour Party	185	4.60	
West Kwaio	5,786	Anderson K. Raenaitoro	Independent	177	4.40	
West Kwaio	5,786	John Nika	Independent	115	2.90	
West Kwaio	5,786	Tony Uania	Solomon Islands United Party	65	1.60	
West Kwaio	5,786	Harry Haihanasi Arufaegwao	Independent	4	0.10	
West Kwaio	5,786	Rejected votes		57	1.40	
West Kwara'ae	10,755	Sam Shemuel Iduri	Solomon Islands Democratic Party	1,297	20.10	Elected
West Kwara'ae	10,755	Martin Aebata	Independent	1,022	15.80	
West Kwara'ae	10,755	David Dausabea	Independent	597	9.20	
West Kwara'ae	10,755	Rose Anilabata	Independent	502	7.80	
West Kwara'ae	10,755	Freddy Ratu Saenile	Solomon Islands Party for Rural Advancement	457	7.10	
West Kwara'ae	10,755	Andrew Loboi	Independent	450	7.00	
West Kwara'ae	10,755	Fagal Aengari	People's Alliance Party	358	5.50	
West Kwara'ae	10,755	Paul Kukute Daokalia	National Party	315	4.90	
West Kwara'ae	10,755	John Alfred Tuasulia	Lafari Party	303	4.70	
West Kwara'ae	10,755	Casper Joseph Fa'asala	Solomon Islands Liberal Party	237	3.70	
West Kwara'ae	10,755	Andrew Moli	Solomon Islands Labour Party	231	3.60	
West Kwara'ae	10,755	Hudson Faitadi	People's Alliance Party	178	2.80	
West Kwara'ae	10,755	Walton Willy Abuito'o	Independent	165	2.60	
West Kwara'ae	10,755	Robert Oi	Lafari Party	130	2.00	
West Kwara'ae	10,755	Joses Naumai	Christian Alliance Party	119	1.80	
West Kwara'ae	10,755	John Donation Maefaididia	Independent	78	1.20	
West Kwara'ae	10,755	Joshua Waneta	Independent	19	0.30	
West Kwara'ae	10,755	Peter Indu	Independent	9	0.10	
West Makira	6,069	Japhet Waipora	Solomon Islands Liberal Party	790	19.40	Elected
West Makira	6,069	Jackson Sunaone	Independent	767	18.80	
West Makira	6,069	Ben Hoda Mato'o	Independent	338	8.30	
West Makira	6,069	John Mark Huta	Independent	320	7.80	
West Makira	6,069	Dick Ha'amori	Independent	310	7.60	
West Makira	6,069	David Bo'orauniara Aitora	Independent	282	6.90	
West Makira	6,069	Mathias Taro	Independent	259	6.40	Unseated
West Makira	6,069	Charles Stennett Kereau	Independent	187	4.60	
West Makira	6,069	David Wakasi	Independent	175	4.30	
West Makira	6,069	Haga Mataroha John Palmer	Independent	127	3.10	
West Makira	6,069	Clara Rebitai	Independent	120	2.90	
West Makira	6,069	Thompson Orimatawa	Independent	106	2.60	
West Makira	6,069	Peter Tahaani	Independent	79	1.90	
West Makira	6,069	Kennedy Hoda	Independent	65	1.60	
West Makira	6,069	Michael Saiki Waokahi	Independent	47	1.20	
West Makira	6,069	Leslie Gua	Independent	45	1.10	
West Makira	6,069	Rejected votes		61	1.50	
West New Georgia/Vona Vona	8,104	Peter James Boyers	Independent	1,699	34.30	Re-elected
West New Georgia/Vona Vona	8,104	John Deane Kuku	Independent	926	18.70	
West New Georgia/Vona Vona	8,104	Andrew Prakash	Independent	853	17.20	
West New Georgia/Vona Vona	8,104	Ashley Wickham	Solomon Islands Party for Rural Advancement	795	16.00	
West New Georgia/Vona Vona	8,104	Nuatali Tongarutu	Independent	331	6.70	
West New Georgia/Vona Vona	8,104	Warren Paia	National Party	209	4.20	
West New Georgia/Vona Vona	8,104	Wilson Gina	Independent	78	1.60	
West New Georgia/Vona Vona	8,104	Rejected votes		68	1.40	
