= Twelve Pillars to Peace and Prosperity Party =

- Leader: Delma Nori
- Founded: 30 May 2010
- Ideology: Feminism

The Twelve Pillars to Peace and Prosperity Party (TP4) was a feminist political party in Solomon Islands. Launched on 30 May 2010 by Delma Nori, it was the first "women's party" in the country's history. Its stated aim was "to provide a channel for mobilization of women and men who believe in a democratic process that is gender friendly". The party's broader platform included the decentralisation funding so rural areas will have better services, and cutting the size of government.

== History ==
Despite being a women's rights party, its membership was not restricted to women. The party was originally formed with only women members but male members joined. Their initial policy was to secure 10 reserved seats in the Parliament of the Solomon Islands for women,

It took part in the 2010 general election, seeking to have women elected to a Parliament which, in its outgoing legislature, contained no female representatives. This was partially due to the fact that only one woman had been elected to the Parliament of the Solomon Islands in its history. It also called for a more equitable share of the country's resources. The party faced considerable push back and many early supporters withdrew their support. Speaking to media, Nori commented "My party will not tolerate this sort of behavior” and that women could carry roles in public office as ably as men. The party's candidates received threats, with some withdrawing from the election as a result. In the election, Twelve Pillars failed to win any seats and no women were elected to the Parliament again. The party did not stand in the 2014 Solomon Islands general election but it did result in the second ever woman elected to Parliament.
