= Solomon Islands Social Credit Party =

- Leader: Manasseh Sogavare
- Founded: July 2005
- Dissolved: By 2010
- Succeeded by: Ownership, Unity and Responsibility Party
- Ideology: Social credit
- National affiliation: Solomon Islands Alliance for Change

The Solomon Islands Social Credit Party ("Socreds") was a political party in the Solomon Islands that espoused social credit theories of monetary reform. It opposed foreign interference in the economy of the country.

It was led by Prime Minister Manasseh Sogavare, previously leader of the People's Progressive Party and the former Member of Parliament for East Choiseul. Sogavare launched the party in July 2005, backed by Filipino businessman Ramon Quitales. Other prominent party members included Clay Forau Soalaoi.

It was a member of a four-party coalition, the Solomon Islands Alliance for Change, which included the National Party, Solomon Islands Liberal Party, and the Solomon Islands Party for Rural Advancement, and groups of independents from Honiara, Malaita and Guadalcanal.

The party opposes foreign control of the economy, and advocates a full monetary and financial reform in line with the ideology of social credit. It believes that the islands' poverty can only be addressed through social credit monetary reform. The party traced its origins to the New Zealand Social Credit Party and one of its leaders, Bruce Beetham, who hosted a Solomon Islands student in his home. That student, Solomon Mamaloni, later became prime minister of the Solomon Islands.

The party, running candidates for the first time, contested 29 constituencies in the 2006 general election. The party won 4.3% of the vote and 2 seats. In 2007, the party had around 10,000 members. Soon after, it was dissolved and absorbed by the Ownership, Unity and Responsibility Party, again led by Sogavare.

== See also ==
- Social credit
- List of political parties in the Solomon Islands
