= 2001 Solomon Islands general election =

- 5 December 2001
- All 50 seats in the National Parliament; 26 seats needed for a majority
| Party | Leader | Seats | +/– |
|---|---|---|---|
| People's Alliance | Allan Kemakeza | 20 | +13 |
| AIM | | 13 | New |
| SIAC | | 12 | +8 |
| PPP | | 3 | New |
| Labour | Joses Tuhanuku | 1 | 0 |
This lists parties that won seats. See the complete results below.
| Prime Minister before | Prime Minister after |
|---|---|
| Manasseh Sogavare; Independent | Allan Kemakeza; People's Alliance |

General elections were held in the Solomon Islands on 5 December 2001. The People's Alliance Party won the most seats, and its leader, Allan Kemakeza became Prime Minister.

== Results ==
| Party | Votes | % | Seats | +/– |
|---|---|---|---|---|
| People's Alliance Party | | | 20 | +13 |
| Association of Independent Members | | | 13 | New |
| Solomon Islands Alliance for Change | | | 12 | +8 |
| People's Progressive Party | | | 3 | New |
| Solomon Islands Labour Party | | | 1 | – |
| Other parties | | | 1 | – |
| Total | | | 50 | 0 |
| Total votes | 178,161 | – | | |
| Registered voters/turnout | 287,940 | 61.87 | | |
Source: Solomon Islands Election Resources, IPU

=== By constituency ===
Results by constituency
| Constituency | Electorate | Candidate | Votes | % | Notes |
|---|---|---|---|---|---|
| Aoke/Langalanga | 7,131 | Batholomew Ulufa'alu | 3,081 | 65.90 | Re-elected |
| Aoke/Langalanga | 7,131 | Francis Ferateilia Sawane | 908 | 19.40 | |
| Aoke/Langalanga | 7,131 | Peter Baru | 531 | 11.40 | |
| Aoke/Langalanga | 7,131 | Francis Joseph Saemala | 152 | 3.30 | |
| Baegu/Asifola | 6,279 | Steve Aumanu | 1,273 | 34.70 | Re-elected |
| Baegu/Asifola | 6,279 | Gabriel K Suri | 790 | 21.50 | |
| Baegu/Asifola | 6,279 | Joseph Ofotalau | 595 | 16.20 | |
| Baegu/Asifola | 6,279 | Jasper Tagani Anisi | 463 | 12.60 | |
| Baegu/Asifola | 6,279 | Daniel Aba | 439 | 12.00 | |
| Baegu/Asifola | 6,279 | George Suri Kwanae | 110 | 3.00 | |
| Central Guadalcanal | 5,042 | Walton Naezol | 1,364 | 43.60 | Re-elected |
| Central Guadalcanal | 5,042 | Napter N Lui | 532 | 17.00 | |
| Central Guadalcanal | 5,042 | Peter Shanel Agovaka | 515 | 16.50 | |
| Central Guadalcanal | 5,042 | Justice Denni | 383 | 12.20 | |
| Central Guadalcanal | 5,042 | Bernard Teli | 333 | 10.60 | |
| Central Honiara | 12,551 | Meshach Maebiru Maetoloa | 1,025 | 27.00 | Elected |
| Central Honiara | 12,551 | John Moffat Fugui | 906 | 23.90 | |
| Central Honiara | 12,551 | Moon Pin Kwan | 824 | 21.70 | Unseated |
| Central Honiara | 12,551 | Robert Lulumani | 485 | 12.80 | |
| Central Honiara | 12,551 | Catherine Adifaka | 293 | 7.70 | |
| Central Honiara | 12,551 | Robert Wales Feraltelia | 142 | 3.70 | |
| Central Honiara | 12,551 | Paul B. Garo | 99 | 2.60 | |
| Central Honiara | 12,551 | Ben Gale | 24 | 0.60 | |
| Central Kwara'ae | 9,070 | Fred Iro Fono | 3,016 | 53.70 | Re-elected |
| Central Kwara'ae | 9,070 | David Dausabea | 1,095 | 19.50 | |
| Central Kwara'ae | 9,070 | Richard Na'amo Irosaea | 558 | 9.90 | |
| Central Kwara'ae | 9,070 | John Hugo | 477 | 8.50 | |
| Central Kwara'ae | 9,070 | Harold D Leka | 474 | 8.40 | |
| Central Makira | 4,025 | Bernard Ghiro | 643 | 21.30 | Elected |
| Central Makira | 4,025 | Reginald Nunu | 580 | 19.20 | |
| Central Makira | 4,025 | Japhet Waipora | 442 | 14.60 | Unseated |
| Central Makira | 4,025 | Gad Hagasuramo | 407 | 13.50 | |
| Central Makira | 4,025 | Paul Watoto | 383 | 12.70 | |
| Central Makira | 4,025 | Fredson Fenua | 267 | 8.80 | |
| Central Makira | 4,025 | Alfred Wato | 88 | 2.90 | |
| Central Makira | 4,025 | Ellison Ramo | 77 | 2.50 | |
| Central Makira | 4,025 | Ishmael Tuki | 68 | 2.30 | |
| Central Makira | 4,025 | Benedict Kinika | 67 | 2.20 | |
| East ꞌAreꞌare | 4,754 | Edward Huniehu | 804 | 22.40 | Elected |
| East ꞌAreꞌare | 4,754 | Michael Ahikau | 795 | 22.20 | |
| East ꞌAreꞌare | 4,754 | Dickson Warakohia | 719 | 20.10 | Unseated |
| East ꞌAreꞌare | 4,754 | Michael Wairamo | 666 | 18.60 | |
| East ꞌAreꞌare | 4,754 | Brian S Taba'a | 418 | 11.70 | |
| East ꞌAreꞌare | 4,754 | Benjamin Harohau | 110 | 3.10 | |
| East ꞌAreꞌare | 4,754 | James Nihopara | 50 | 1.40 | |
| East ꞌAreꞌare | 4,754 | Jerry Haipora Terenihona | 23 | 0.60 | |
| East Central Guadalcanal | 4,866 | Nollen C. Leni | 913 | 26.20 | Elected |
| East Central Guadalcanal | 4,866 | Hilda Thugea Kari | 800 | 22.90 | Unseated |
| East Central Guadalcanal | 4,866 | Mark Gatu | 670 | 19.20 | |
| East Central Guadalcanal | 4,866 | John Gela | 464 | 13.30 | |
| East Central Guadalcanal | 4,866 | Daniel S Sande | 456 | 13.10 | |
| East Central Guadalcanal | 4,866 | Johnson Kengalu | 187 | 5.40 | |
| East Choiseul | 3,377 | Mannaseh Sogavare | 1,225 | 48.90 | Re-elected |
| East Choiseul | 3,377 | Allan Qurusu | 952 | 38.00 | |
| East Choiseul | 3,377 | Billy Takubala | 190 | 7.60 | |
| East Choiseul | 3,377 | Nason Neko Degerekolo | 137 | 5.50 | |
| East Guadalcanal | 5,542 | Johnson Koli | 1,815 | 52.30 | Re-elected |
| East Guadalcanal | 5,542 | Celestine Solosaia | 1,355 | 39.00 | |
| East Guadalcanal | 5,542 | Bobby Marcellin Tangi | 234 | 6.70 | |
| East Guadalcanal | 5,542 | Josph Tua'ai | 67 | 1.90 | |
| East Honiara | 18,690 | Simeon Bouro | 1,631 | 29.70 | Elected |
| East Honiara | 18,690 | Charles Dausabea | 1,019 | 18.60 | Unseated |
| East Honiara | 18,690 | David Jack Maesua | 821 | 15.00 | |
| East Honiara | 18,690 | George Avosa Tuke | 692 | 12.60 | |
| East Honiara | 18,690 | John Maetia Kaliuae | 678 | 12.40 | |
| East Honiara | 18,690 | Ann M. Saenemua | 437 | 8.00 | |
| East Honiara | 18,690 | Jason Waley | 206 | 3.80 | |
| East Kwaio | 7,450 | Alfred Solomon Sasako | 2,682 | 62.80 | Re-elected |
| East Kwaio | 7,450 | Stanley Festus Sofu | 1,027 | 24.10 | |
| East Kwaio | 7,450 | Diki Kolosu | 331 | 7.80 | |
| East Kwaio | 7,450 | Bilsshan Caleb Safa'a | 229 | 5.40 | |
| East Makira | 5,978 | David Sitai | 1,454 | 30.40 | Re-elected |
| East Makira | 5,978 | Fred P. Fanua | 794 | 16.60 | |
| East Makira | 5,978 | Martin Karani | 722 | 15.10 | |
| East Makira | 5,978 | Philip Taisau | 499 | 10.40 | |
| East Makira | 5,978 | Thomas Weape | 459 | 9.60 | |
| East Makira | 5,978 | Clement Waiwori | 342 | 7.20 | |
| East Makira | 5,978 | Mathias Pepena | 338 | 7.10 | |
| East Makira | 5,978 | Stephen Siapu | 170 | 3.60 | |
| East Malaita | 5,834 | Joses Wawari Sanga | 701 | 19.10 | Elected |
| East Malaita | 5,834 | Afu Lia Billy | 699 | 19.00 | |
| East Malaita | 5,834 | Robert Nathan Mautai | 559 | 15.20 | |
| East Malaita | 5,834 | Alfred Maetia | 460 | 12.50 | Unseated |
| East Malaita | 5,834 | Robert Belo Mafane | 338 | 9.20 | |
| East Malaita | 5,834 | Benedic Udu | 229 | 6.20 | |
| East Malaita | 5,834 | John Rockson Tamofaolu | 227 | 6.20 | |
| East Malaita | 5,834 | Samson Kwasi | 201 | 5.50 | |
| East Malaita | 5,834 | Wilson Kafo Mamau | 167 | 4.50 | |
| East Malaita | 5,834 | Alfred Aofia | 96 | 2.60 | |
| Fataleka | 5,785 | Casper Cassidy Luiramo | 1,067 | 26.30 | Elected |
| Fataleka | 5,785 | Ronidi Mani | 868 | 21.40 | Unseated |
| Fataleka | 5,785 | Frank Dele Iamaea | 548 | 13.50 | |
| Fataleka | 5,785 | Fred Bae | 543 | 13.40 | |
| Fataleka | 5,785 | William Isui | 384 | 9.50 | |
| Fataleka | 5,785 | George Mamimu | 282 | 6.90 | |
| Fataleka | 5,785 | Paul Henry Ratu | 174 | 4.30 | |
| Fataleka | 5,785 | Stephen T Iromea | 83 | 2.00 | |
| Fataleka | 5,785 | Saxon Talo | 66 | 1.60 | |
| Fataleka | 5,785 | Matthew Iroga | 44 | 1.10 | |
| Gao/Bugotu | 4,097 | Eric Notere | 987 | 33.90 | Elected |
| Gao/Bugotu | 4,097 | William H. Gigini | 789 | 27.10 | Unseated |
| Gao/Bugotu | 4,097 | Nathaniel Supa | 524 | 18.00 | |
| Gao/Bugotu | 4,097 | Basil Manelegua | 426 | 14.60 | |
| Gao/Bugotu | 4,097 | Josiah P Riogano | 186 | 6.40 | |
| Gizo/Kolombangara | 6,869 | Gordon Darcy Lilo | 985 | 26.40 | Elected |
| Gizo/Kolombangara | 6,869 | Jackson Piasi | 611 | 16.40 | Unseated |
| Gizo/Kolombangara | 6,869 | Daniel Kennedy | 585 | 15.70 | |
| Gizo/Kolombangara | 6,869 | John Kabalo | 558 | 14.90 | |
| Gizo/Kolombangara | 6,869 | Noah Zala | 338 | 9.00 | |
| Gizo/Kolombangara | 6,869 | Clement Domonic Tebaia | 279 | 7.50 | |
| Gizo/Kolombangara | 6,869 | Warren Paia | 193 | 5.20 | |
| Gizo/Kolombangara | 6,869 | Iabeta Beneteti | 98 | 2.60 | |
| Gizo/Kolombangara | 6,869 | Robert Moses Zutu | 89 | 2.40 | |
| Hograno/Kia/Havulei | 4,714 | Nelson Kehe Kile | 1,804 | 54.80 | Elected |
| Hograno/Kia/Havulei | 4,714 | Michael M Meredi | 555 | 16.90 | |
| Hograno/Kia/Havulei | 4,714 | Reuben Natowan | 499 | 15.20 | |
| Hograno/Kia/Havulei | 4,714 | Edmond H Anderson | 433 | 13.20 | Unseated |
| Lau/Mbaelelea | 11,564 | Paul Maenu'u | 2,687 | 35.50 | Elected |
| Lau/Mbaelelea | 11,564 | Walter Folotalu | 956 | 12.60 | |
| Lau/Mbaelelea | 11,564 | Charles Ferania Sale | 708 | 9.30 | Unseated |
| Lau/Mbaelelea | 11,564 | James Roni | 640 | 8.40 | |
| Lau/Mbaelelea | 11,564 | Judson Lee Leafasia | 593 | 7.80 | |
| Lau/Mbaelelea | 11,564 | Dick Daoleni | 581 | 7.70 | |
| Lau/Mbaelelea | 11,564 | Alfrence Inoga Fatai | 551 | 7.30 | |
| Lau/Mbaelelea | 11,564 | Francis Kairi | 451 | 6.00 | |
| Lau/Mbaelelea | 11,564 | John Ratu Daofainia | 185 | 2.40 | |
| Lau/Mbaelelea | 11,564 | Wesley Saaga | 111 | 1.50 | |
| Lau/Mbaelelea | 11,564 | Ben Foukona | 66 | 0.90 | |
| Lau/Mbaelelea | 11,564 | James Maesulia | 48 | 0.60 | |
| Malaita Outer Islands | 2,073 | David Holosivi | 322 | 22.90 | Re-elected |
| Malaita Outer Islands | 2,073 | Henry Manuhea | 310 | 22.00 | |
| Malaita Outer Islands | 2,073 | Patrick Vahoe | 189 | 13.40 | |
| Malaita Outer Islands | 2,073 | Abraham Kapei | 184 | 13.10 | |
| Malaita Outer Islands | 2,073 | Manasseh Apekeia Avicks | 175 | 12.40 | |
| Malaita Outer Islands | 2,073 | Gabriel Kemaiki | 128 | 9.10 | |
| Malaita Outer Islands | 2,073 | Paul Keyaumi | 84 | 6.00 | |
| Malaita Outer Islands | 2,073 | Allen Hareehi | 16 | 1.10 | |
| Maringe/Kokota | 4,798 | Clement Rojumana | 932 | 24.70 | Elected |
| Maringe/Kokota | 4,798 | Charles De Fox | 835 | 22.10 | |
| Maringe/Kokota | 4,798 | Hugo Ragoso | 689 | 18.20 | Unseated |
| Maringe/Kokota | 4,798 | Thomas Koh Chan | 663 | 17.50 | |
| Maringe/Kokota | 4,798 | Varian Lonamei | 276 | 7.30 | |
| Maringe/Kokota | 4,798 | Allan Diamana | 158 | 4.20 | |
| Maringe/Kokota | 4,798 | Peter Haauia | 125 | 3.30 | |
| Maringe/Kokota | 4,798 | Andrew Gedy | 101 | 2.70 | |
| Marovo | 7,097 | Snyder Rini | 1,951 | 39.50 | Re-elected |
| Marovo | 7,097 | Duddley Hirata | 1,870 | 37.90 | |
| Marovo | 7,097 | Alex Lokopio Ringi | 990 | 20.10 | |
| Marovo | 7,097 | Nixon Dennie | 122 | 2.50 | |
| Nggela | 8,997 | Frank Bollen Pule | 1,541 | 22.10 | Elected |
| Nggela | 8,997 | Mark Roboliu Kemakeza | 1,367 | 19.60 | |
| Nggela | 8,997 | Catherine Ann Pule | 854 | 12.20 | |
| Nggela | 8,997 | Charles Fox Manebona | 826 | 11.80 | |
| Nggela | 8,997 | Simon Teva | 820 | 11.70 | |
| Nggela | 8,997 | Gordon Mara | 660 | 9.50 | Unseated |
| Nggela | 8,997 | John Steward Visivisi | 396 | 5.70 | |
| Nggela | 8,997 | Cecil Ono | 283 | 4.10 | |
| Nggela | 8,997 | William Semu | 235 | 3.40 | |
| North East Guadalcanal | 4,878 | Stephen Paeni | 1,129 | 31.90 | Elected |
| North East Guadalcanal | 4,878 | James Elliot Samu | 839 | 23.70 | |
| North East Guadalcanal | 4,878 | Jamie Lency Vokia | 752 | 21.30 | |
| North East Guadalcanal | 4,878 | Simon Tonavi | 492 | 13.90 | |
| North East Guadalcanal | 4,878 | John Tome | 219 | 6.20 | |
| North East Guadalcanal | 4,878 | Gideon Moses | 107 | 3.00 | |
| North Guadalcanal | 2,881 | Edmond Rukale | 508 | 24.50 | Elected |
| North Guadalcanal | 2,881 | Benedict Garemane | 447 | 21.60 | |
| North Guadalcanal | 2,881 | Stephen Panga | 352 | 17.00 | |
| North Guadalcanal | 2,881 | Batholomew Vavanga | 318 | 15.30 | |
| North Guadalcanal | 2,881 | Andrew Kuvu | 259 | 12.50 | |
| North Guadalcanal | 2,881 | Alfred Thugea | 189 | 9.10 | |
| North Malaita | 7,522 | Daniel R Faafunua | 1,185 | 23.50 | Elected |
| North Malaita | 7,522 | Leliana D Firisua | 784 | 15.60 | |
| North Malaita | 7,522 | Daniel E. Kwanairara | 768 | 15.30 | Unseated |
| North Malaita | 7,522 | Michael Maeliau | 738 | 14.70 | |
| North Malaita | 7,522 | Pateson Fulaburi | 603 | 12.00 | |
| North Malaita | 7,522 | Elton Osiagalo | 584 | 11.60 | |
| North Malaita | 7,522 | Raymond Cornelius Suinao | 157 | 3.10 | |
| North Malaita | 7,522 | Marylene Daefa Mase | 136 | 2.70 | |
| North Malaita | 7,522 | Swanson Cornelius Konofilia | 67 | 1.30 | |
| North Malaita | 7,522 | Joseph Taega | 12 | 0.20 | |
| North New Georgia | 2,329 | Job Dudley Tausinga | 1,224 | 73.70 | Re-elected |
| North New Georgia | 2,329 | Gordon Kachel Rence | 437 | 26.30 | |
| North Vella Lavella | 2,562 | Danny Bula | 695 | 36.00 | Elected |
| North Vella Lavella | 2,562 | Allan Paul | 554 | 28.70 | Unseated |
| North Vella Lavella | 2,562 | Arnold Moveni | 282 | 14.60 | |
| North Vella Lavella | 2,562 | David Lani Gina | 239 | 12.40 | |
| North Vella Lavella | 2,562 | Steven Martin | 120 | 6.20 | |
| North Vella Lavella | 2,562 | Billy Maelagi | 41 | 2.10 | |
| North West Choiseul | 5,437 | Clement Pikabatu Kengava | 1,567 | 38.70 | Elected |
| North West Choiseul | 5,437 | Luke Pitakoe | 742 | 18.30 | |
| North West Choiseul | 5,437 | Alpha Kimata | 620 | 15.30 | Unseated |
| North West Choiseul | 5,437 | William Pita Kutinikolo | 513 | 12.70 | |
| North West Choiseul | 5,437 | Kipling Taqia Alavae | 392 | 9.70 | |
| North West Choiseul | 5,437 | Matthew Morris Kiko Zaavae Nikolo | 217 | 5.40 | |
| North West Guadalcanal | 4,884 | Siriako Usa | 1,161 | 38.00 | Elected |
| North West Guadalcanal | 4,884 | Gabriel Leua Lovanitila | 550 | 18.00 | |
| North West Guadalcanal | 4,884 | Baokosu Richard Selwyn | 427 | 14.00 | |
| North West Guadalcanal | 4,884 | Tadakusu Bernadette | 261 | 8.50 | |
| North West Guadalcanal | 4,884 | Ben Michael | 226 | 7.40 | |
| North West Guadalcanal | 4,884 | Jim Peter | 221 | 7.20 | |
| North West Guadalcanal | 4,884 | Chualu Valeriano | 211 | 6.90 | |
| Ranongga/Simbo | 4,808 | Francis Billy Hilly | 1,336 | 40.70 | Re-elected |
| Ranongga/Simbo | 4,808 | Charles Kelly | 937 | 28.60 | |
| Ranongga/Simbo | 4,808 | Tommy Toata | 585 | 17.80 | |
| Ranongga/Simbo | 4,808 | Sam Kiko Tatapa | 421 | 12.80 | |
| Rennell/Bellona | 2,973 | Joses Taungenga Tuhanuku | 681 | 36.30 | Elected |
| Rennell/Bellona | 2,973 | Saueha Joses Tahua | 477 | 25.40 | Unseated |
| Rennell/Bellona | 2,973 | Saul Tepai | 228 | 12.10 | |
| Rennell/Bellona | 2,973 | Delma Nori Kaitu'u | 211 | 11.20 | |
| Rennell/Bellona | 2,973 | Edward Kaitu'u Agikimua | 161 | 8.60 | |
| Rennell/Bellona | 2,973 | Albert Hatigeva | 69 | 3.70 | |
| Rennell/Bellona | 2,973 | Solomon Maui Taugenga | 51 | 2.70 | |
| Russells/Savo | 5,596 | Allan Kemakeza | 2,488 | 60.90 | Re-elected |
| Russells/Savo | 5,596 | Christopher Narasia | 868 | 21.20 | |
| Russells/Savo | 5,596 | Matthen Sale | 685 | 16.80 | |
| Russells/Savo | 5,596 | Eddy Grant Suku | 45 | 1.10 | |
| Shortland | 2,330 | Augustine Taneko | 382 | 21.80 | Elected |
| Shortland | 2,330 | Albert Bakale Laore | 365 | 20.80 | Unseated |
| Shortland | 2,330 | Acquila Maike | 273 | 15.50 | |
| Shortland | 2,330 | Dominic Tata | 218 | 12.40 | |
| Shortland | 2,330 | Caroline Laore Gorae | 132 | 7.50 | |
| Shortland | 2,330 | Martina Ului | 98 | 5.60 | |
| Shortland | 2,330 | Roy Kelosi | 94 | 5.40 | |
| Shortland | 2,330 | Robert Lebo | 88 | 5.00 | |
| Shortland | 2,330 | Joseph Isang Pitu | 71 | 4.00 | |
| Shortland | 2,330 | Moses Silvestern Bariri | 35 | 2.00 | |
| Small Malaita | 9,166 | Alex Bartlett | 1,941 | 29.50 | Elected |
| Small Malaita | 9,166 | William Nii Haomae | 1,124 | 17.10 | Unseated |
| Small Malaita | 9,166 | Stephen Maesiola | 835 | 12.70 | |
| Small Malaita | 9,166 | Matthew Fakaia | 719 | 10.90 | |
| Small Malaita | 9,166 | Lii Omile Ara | 628 | 9.50 | |
| Small Malaita | 9,166 | Peter Nikae | 563 | 8.60 | |
| Small Malaita | 9,166 | Michael Masiha | 501 | 7.60 | |
| Small Malaita | 9,166 | Israel Wore | 141 | 2.10 | |
| Small Malaita | 9,166 | Robert Hite | 132 | 2.00 | |
| South Choiseul | 4,370 | Leslie Boseto | 1,395 | 49.20 | Re-elected |
| South Choiseul | 4,370 | Jerry Pitisopa | 1,095 | 38.60 | |
| South Choiseul | 4,370 | Wilson Pita | 245 | 8.60 | |
| South Choiseul | 4,370 | Moses Puibangara Pitakaka | 101 | 3.60 | |
| South Guadalcanal | 4,620 | Augustine Geve | 2,083 | 63.20 | Elected |
| South Guadalcanal | 4,620 | Sethuel Kelly | 750 | 22.70 | |
| South Guadalcanal | 4,620 | Victor Samuel Ngele | 263 | 8.00 | Unseated |
| South Guadalcanal | 4,620 | Victor Totu | 202 | 6.10 | |
| South New Georgia/Rendova/Tetepari | 4,811 | Francis John Zama | 1,436 | 39.80 | Elected |
| South New Georgia/Rendova/Tetepari | 4,811 | Danny Philip | 1,246 | 34.50 | Unseated |
| South New Georgia/Rendova/Tetepari | 4,811 | Rodrick Terry Kera | 810 | 22.40 | |
| South New Georgia/Rendova/Tetepari | 4,811 | George Solingi Lilo Bubele | 120 | 3.30 | |
| South Vella Lavella | 3,529 | Trevor Olavae | 901 | 33.20 | Elected |
| South Vella Lavella | 3,529 | Ronald Ivupitu | 708 | 26.10 | |
| South Vella Lavella | 3,529 | Robins Mesepitu | 660 | 24.30 | Unseated |
| South Vella Lavella | 3,529 | Me Bervis Kimisi | 442 | 16.30 | |
| Temotu Nende | 6,139 | John Patterson Oti | 2,485 | 54.40 | Re-elected |
| Temotu Nende | 6,139 | George Henry Malirbaal | 1,329 | 29.10 | |
| Temotu Nende | 6,139 | Luke Memua | 281 | 6.10 | |
| Temotu Nende | 6,139 | Fernandez Tungale | 245 | 5.40 | |
| Temotu Nende | 6,139 | Simon Peter Meioko | 232 | 5.10 | |
| Temotu Pele | 3,781 | Michael Maina | 1,463 | 56.10 | Re-elected |
| Temotu Pele | 3,781 | Martin Teddy Magga | 748 | 28.70 | |
| Temotu Pele | 3,781 | Levi M Laka | 126 | 4.80 | |
| Temotu Pele | 3,781 | Thomas Salopuka | 110 | 4.20 | |
| Temotu Pele | 3,781 | John Mark Mumomalo | 86 | 3.30 | |
| Temotu Pele | 3,781 | Justine G Nuboa | 74 | 2.80 | |
| Temotu Vatud | 2,537 | Jeffrey Teava | 495 | 25.70 | Elected |
| Temotu Vatud | 2,537 | Alfred Ramsey Napeaurua | 475 | 24.70 | |
| Temotu Vatud | 2,537 | Hudson Teava Rangisearofa | 360 | 18.70 | Unseated |
| Temotu Vatud | 2,537 | Michael Meone | 224 | 11.60 | |
| Temotu Vatud | 2,537 | Ross Hepworth | 217 | 11.30 | |
| Temotu Vatud | 2,537 | Lazarus Munamua | 155 | 8.00 | |
| Ulawa/Ugi | 2,564 | Nathaniel Rahumae Waena | 1,016 | 49.20 | Re-elected |
| Ulawa/Ugi | 2,564 | John Douglas Teaitala | 903 | 43.70 | |
| Ulawa/Ugi | 2,564 | Commins Ikioa | 147 | 7.10 | |
| West ꞌAreꞌare | 4,572 | Alfred Hairiu | 1,166 | 34.50 | Re-elected |
| West ꞌAreꞌare | 4,572 | Aloysio Ma'ahanoa | 801 | 23.70 | |
| West ꞌAreꞌare | 4,572 | Lawrence Hunumeme | 375 | 11.10 | |
| West ꞌAreꞌare | 4,572 | Charles Karaori | 366 | 10.80 | |
| West ꞌAreꞌare | 4,572 | Jack Hou'apa Sunaiano | 309 | 9.20 | |
| West ꞌAreꞌare | 4,572 | Joe Timothy Ariaria | 277 | 8.20 | |
| West ꞌAreꞌare | 4,572 | Mark Isaac | 81 | 2.40 | |
| West Guadalcanal | 4,141 | Laurie Chan | 1,043 | 32.40 | Elected |
| West Guadalcanal | 4,141 | Titus Sura | 988 | 30.60 | |
| West Guadalcanal | 4,141 | Kamilo Teke | 566 | 17.60 | |
| West Guadalcanal | 4,141 | Donasiano Keli | 340 | 10.50 | |
| West Guadalcanal | 4,141 | Edme Ziokera | 197 | 6.10 | |
| West Guadalcanal | 4,141 | Francis Tavalo | 90 | 2.80 | |
| West Honiara | 9,477 | Yukio Sato | 1,347 | 44.40 | Elected |
| West Honiara | 9,477 | James Henry Star Dora | 604 | 19.90 | |
| West Honiara | 9,477 | Mahlon Toito'ona | 281 | 9.30 | |
| West Honiara | 9,477 | Paul Baekalia | 280 | 9.20 | |
| West Honiara | 9,477 | Isaac Inoke Tosika | 202 | 6.70 | |
| West Honiara | 9,477 | Simeon Brian Pongi | 84 | 2.80 | |
| West Honiara | 9,477 | Leonard Maenu'u | 77 | 2.50 | |
| West Honiara | 9,477 | Justus Charles Lesimaoma | 69 | 2.30 | |
| West Honiara | 9,477 | Frank Pororara | 47 | 1.60 | |
| West Honiara | 9,477 | Rolland Timo | 40 | 1.30 | |
| West Kwaio | 5,168 | John Martin Garo | 1,457 | 38.40 | Elected |
| West Kwaio | 5,168 | David Nguiburi | 1,384 | 36.50 | |
| West Kwaio | 5,168 | George Luialamo | 814 | 21.40 | Unseated |
| West Kwaio | 5,168 | Christian Bili | 88 | 2.30 | |
| West Kwaio | 5,168 | Jack Francis Ross | 31 | 0.80 | |
| West Kwaio | 5,168 | Denis Taeburi | 21 | 0.60 | |
| West Kwara'ae | 9,023 | Benjamin Patrick Una | 879 | 13.60 | Elected |
| West Kwara'ae | 9,023 | Sam Shemuel Iduri | 832 | 12.90 | |
| West Kwara'ae | 9,023 | Stephen Tonafalea | 829 | 12.80 | Unseated |
| West Kwara'ae | 9,023 | Paul Kukute Daokalia | 684 | 10.60 | |
| West Kwara'ae | 9,023 | Robert Wilson Aioro | 588 | 9.10 | |
| West Kwara'ae | 9,023 | Joses Naumai | 549 | 8.50 | |
| West Kwara'ae | 9,023 | Thomas Patteson Tomu Kwanate'e | 477 | 7.40 | |
| West Kwara'ae | 9,023 | Philip Mimidi Nanau | 460 | 7.10 | |
| West Kwara'ae | 9,023 | Sam Alasia | 435 | 6.70 | |
| West Kwara'ae | 9,023 | Francis Loboi | 271 | 4.20 | |
| West Kwara'ae | 9,023 | Margaret Rose Maelaua | 217 | 3.40 | |
| West Kwara'ae | 9,023 | Barton Raomae | 118 | 1.80 | |
| West Kwara'ae | 9,023 | Hudson Eric Waki | 74 | 1.10 | |
| West Kwara'ae | 9,023 | Rose Anilabata | 54 | 0.80 | |
| West Makira | 4,961 | Mathias Taro | 1,757 | 48.10 | Elected |
| West Makira | 4,961 | Jackson Sunaone | 1,324 | 36.20 | Unseated |
| West Makira | 4,961 | Charles Stennett Kereau | 265 | 7.20 | |
| West Makira | 4,961 | Daniel Dautaha | 178 | 4.90 | |
| West Makira | 4,961 | Albert Bori Sau | 132 | 3.60 | |
| West New Georgia/Vona Vona | 6,298 | Peter James Boyers | 845 | 20.90 | Elected |
| West New Georgia/Vona Vona | 6,298 | Charles Kere | 781 | 19.30 | |
| West New Georgia/Vona Vona | 6,298 | Ashley Wickham | 539 | 13.30 | |
| West New Georgia/Vona Vona | 6,298 | Nelson Boso | 482 | 11.90 | Unseated |
| West New Georgia/Vona Vona | 6,298 | Nuatali Tongarutu | 435 | 10.80 | |
| West New Georgia/Vona Vona | 6,298 | John Talasasa | 419 | 10.40 | |
| West New Georgia/Vona Vona | 6,298 | Ronald Kuba Ziru | 262 | 6.50 | |
| West New Georgia/Vona Vona | 6,298 | Allan H. Tekulu | 201 | 5.00 | |
| West New Georgia/Vona Vona | 6,298 | Edward Daga | 81 | 2.00 | |
