= Lafari Party =

The Lafari Party was a political party in the Solomon Islands, founded in 2005 by John Garo. It contested the 2006 general election, and the party won 2.8% of the vote and 2 out of 50 seats.
