= 2010 Solomon Islands general election =

- 4 August 2010
- All 50 seats in the National Parliament; 26 seats needed for a majority
Party	Leader	Vote %	Seats	+/–
Democratic Party	Steve Abana	10.49	12	+9
OUR Party	Manasseh Sogavare	10.24	4	New
SIPRA	Job Tausinga	3.43	4	0
DDP	Dick Ha'amori	2.40	3	New
IDP	Snyder Rini	1.67	2	New
RDP	Danny Philip	1.32	2	New
RUPP	Samuel Manetoali	1.29	1	New
Liberal Party	Derek Sikua	1.25	1	−1
People's Congress	Fred Fono	0.70	1	New
Independents	–	62.19	20	−10
This lists parties that won seats. See the complete results below.
Prime Minister before	Subsequent Prime Minister
Derek Sikua; Liberal Party	Danny Philip; RDP

General elections were held in the Solomon Islands on 4 August 2010. The election date was announced in May 2010 by Prime Minister Derek Sikua. Although the announcement was deemed to be premature, as only the Governor General has the authority to announce the election date upon the advice of the Electoral Commission, the election date remained the same.

== Candidates ==
There were a total of 509 candidates, including 25 women.

== Results ==
The event was overseen by international election observers connected with the United Nations International Election Observation Coordination Team. The elections were described as peaceful, although strong concerns were expressed about voter registration irregularities.

25 incumbents were returned and 25 were replaced (including three seats where the incumbent chose not to recontest and one seat that was vacant due to the death of Edward Huni'ehu). Of the 50 MPs, most are relatively inexperienced: 45 have served less than two terms in office. The five long-serving MPs are Job Dudley Tausinga (entering his 7th consecutive term), Danny Philip (5th term), Snyder Rini (4th term), Manasseh Sogavare (4th term) and Gordon Darcy Lilo (3rd term).

Party	Votes	%	Seats	+/–
Solomon Islands Democratic Party	24,719	10.49	12	+9
Ownership, Unity and Responsibility Party	24,138	10.24	4	New
Solomon Islands Party for Rural Advancement	8,074	3.43	4	0
Direct Development Party	5,667	2.40	3	New
People's Alliance Party	4,619	1.96	0	−3
National Party	4,474	1.90	0	−4
Independent Democratic Party	3,926	1.67	2	New
Reform Democratic Party	3,119	1.32	2	New
Rural and Urban Political Party	3,051	1.29	1	New
Solomon Islands Liberal Party	2,945	1.25	1	−1
People's Congress Party	1,651	0.70	1	New
Rural Development Party	1,021	0.43	0	New
People's Federation Party	913	0.39	0	New
New Nation Party	806	0.34	0	New
Independents	146,571	62.19	20	−10
Total	235,694	100.00	50	–
Valid votes	235,694	99.08		
Invalid/blank votes	2,178	0.92		
Total votes	237,872	100.00		
Registered voters/turnout	448,189	53.07		
Source: Solomon Islands Election Resources, Election Passport

=== By constituency ===
Results by constituency
Constituency	Electorate	Candidate	Party	Votes	%	Notes
Aoke/Langalanga	8,791	Mathew Cooper Wale	Solomon Islands Democratic Party	1,681	36.70	Re-elected
Aoke/Langalanga	8,791	Billy A. Manu	Independent	1,512	33.00	
Aoke/Langalanga	8,791	Tony Wale	Independent	1,000	21.80	
Aoke/Langalanga	8,791	Richard Ulufa'alu	Solomon Islands Liberal Party	186	4.10	
Aoke/Langalanga	8,791	Judy Kwatena Fionala Barty	Independent	63	1.40	
Aoke/Langalanga	8,791	Frank Bosi	Ownership, Unity and Responsibility Party	63	1.40	
Aoke/Langalanga	8,791	Rejected votes		74	1.60	
Baegu/Asifola	10,173	Toswel Kaua	Independent	1,037	22.60	Re-elected
Baegu/Asifola	10,173	David Tome	Independent	714	15.60	
Baegu/Asifola	10,173	Siau Mana	Independent	647	14.10	
Baegu/Asifola	10,173	Henry Ologa Olobeni	Independent	466	10.20	
Baegu/Asifola	10,173	Tagini Makario	Independent	377	8.20	
Baegu/Asifola	10,173	James Kili	Independent	374	8.10	
Baegu/Asifola	10,173	Thompson Lebeoa	Independent	196	4.30	
Baegu/Asifola	10,173	Peter Kakai Jr.	Independent	167	3.60	
Baegu/Asifola	10,173	Francis Frank Lomo	Independent	126	2.70	
Baegu/Asifola	10,173	Wilfred Akao	Independent	88	1.90	
Baegu/Asifola	10,173	John Tatalo	Independent	87	1.90	
Baegu/Asifola	10,173	Bobby Kusilifu	Independent	68	1.50	
Baegu/Asifola	10,173	Alfred Liata Malakai	Independent	37	0.80	
Baegu/Asifola	10,173	Tony Irobina	Independent	0	0.00	
Baegu/Asifola	10,173	Rejected votes		206	4.50	
Central Guadalcanal	6,829	Peter Shanel Agovaka	Ownership, Unity and Responsibility Party	2,526	54.80	Re-elected
Central Guadalcanal	6,829	Walton Naezol	Independent	2,025	43.90	
Central Guadalcanal	6,829	Rejected votes		58	1.30	
Central Honiara	37,885	John Moffat Fugui	Direct Development Party	1,240	14.90	Elected
Central Honiara	37,885	Jonathan Aqarao Zama	Independent	938	11.30	
Central Honiara	37,885	Fred Peter	Ownership, Unity and Responsibility Party	893	10.70	
Central Honiara	37,885	Francis Waleanisia	Independent	658	7.90	
Central Honiara	37,885	Nelson Ne'e	Independent	496	6.00	Unseated
Central Honiara	37,885	Robert Hite	Independent	442	5.30	
Central Honiara	37,885	Martin Alufurai	Independent	439	5.30	
Central Honiara	37,885	Barnabas Henson	Independent	391	4.70	
Central Honiara	37,885	Steve Lebaro	Independent	354	4.30	
Central Honiara	37,885	Samson Saokwai Raete'e	Independent	321	3.90	
Central Honiara	37,885	Moon Pin Kwan	Independent	315	3.80	
Central Honiara	37,885	Lawrence Makili	Independent	315	3.80	
Central Honiara	37,885	John Buluwale	Independent	236	2.80	
Central Honiara	37,885	Michael Tom Anita	Independent	209	2.50	
Central Honiara	37,885	James Leonard Mua	Independent	208	2.50	
Central Honiara	37,885	Eric Tema	Independent	172	2.10	
Central Honiara	37,885	Delmah Lavina Nori	Independent	136	1.60	
Central Honiara	37,885	Ishmael Idu Misalo	Independent	104	1.20	
Central Honiara	37,885	Eddie Kasute'e Siapu Rarabae	Independent	100	1.20	
Central Honiara	37,885	Charles Matanani	Independent	90	1.10	
Central Honiara	37,885	Duddley Wate	Independent	87	1.00	
Central Honiara	37,885	Bernard Bakote'e	Independent	80	1.00	
Central Honiara	37,885	Beato Apaniai	Independent	73	0.90	
Central Honiara	37,885	Rejected votes		28	0.30	
Central Kwara'ae	9,955	Jackson Fiulaua	Independent	2,936	43.70	Elected
Central Kwara'ae	9,955	Fred Iro Fono	Independent	2,379	35.40	Unseated
Central Kwara'ae	9,955	Philip Damirara Akote'e	Ownership, Unity and Responsibility Party	331	4.90	
Central Kwara'ae	9,955	Reuben Torii Moli	Independent	251	3.70	
Central Kwara'ae	9,955	Collin Maenunu Sigimanu	Independent	232	3.50	
Central Kwara'ae	9,955	John Utukana To'ofilu	Independent	215	3.20	
Central Kwara'ae	9,955	Rose Anilabata	Independent	121	1.80	
Central Kwara'ae	9,955	Fred Maebiru Maetoloa	Independent	77	1.10	
Central Kwara'ae	9,955	Walton Willy Abuito'o	Independent	72	1.10	
Central Kwara'ae	9,955	Clement Lee	Independent	56	0.80	
Central Kwara'ae	9,955	Leonard Sasai	Independent	29	0.40	
Central Kwara'ae	9,955	Rejected votes		22	0.30	
Central Makira	5,510	Hypolite Taremae	Independent	1,360	33.80	Elected
Central Makira	5,510	Bernard Ghiro	Ownership, Unity and Responsibility Party	817	20.30	Unseated
Central Makira	5,510	Nestor Ghiro	Independent	478	11.90	
Central Makira	5,510	Vkey Mansugu	National Party	232	5.80	
Central Makira	5,510	Fredson Fenua	People's Alliance Party	225	5.60	
Central Makira	5,510	Fox Qwaina	Independent	172	4.30	
Central Makira	5,510	Jack Faga	Independent	137	3.40	
Central Makira	5,510	Joseph Tamuatara	Rural Development Party	124	3.10	
Central Makira	5,510	Henry Hagawusia	Independent	122	3.00	
Central Makira	5,510	Nesta Marahora	National Party	121	3.00	
Central Makira	5,510	Paul Watoto	Independent	65	1.60	
Central Makira	5,510	Thomas Nukuafi	Ownership, Unity and Responsibility Party	48	1.20	
Central Makira	5,510	Alfred Wato	Independent	42	1.00	
Central Makira	5,510	Romano Taro	People's Congress Party	31	0.80	
Central Makira	5,510	Edmund Mehare	Independent	25	0.60	
Central Makira	5,510	Aaron Koroa	Independent	8	0.20	
Central Makira	5,510	Rejected votes		19	0.50	
East ꞌAreꞌare	6,651	Andrew Hanaria Keniasina	Independent	1,000	21.70	Elected
East ꞌAreꞌare	6,651	Aliki Tokii Ha'apio	Independent	947	20.50	
East ꞌAreꞌare	6,651	Andrew Manepora'a	Independent	903	19.60	
East ꞌAreꞌare	6,651	Abraham Namokari	Independent	792	17.20	
East ꞌAreꞌare	6,651	Michael Ahikau	Independent	628	13.60	
East ꞌAreꞌare	6,651	Brian Aonima	Independent	274	5.90	
East ꞌAreꞌare	6,651	Joseph Hatamane Ririmae	Independent	54	1.20	
East ꞌAreꞌare	6,651	Jerry Haipora Terenihona	Independent	3	0.10	
East ꞌAreꞌare	6,651	Rejected votes		11	0.20	
East Central Guadalcanal	7,458	Joseph Onika	Ownership, Unity and Responsibility Party	1,133	24.80	Elected
East Central Guadalcanal	7,458	Nollen C. Leni	Independent	961	21.00	Unseated
East Central Guadalcanal	7,458	Gordon Tapalia	Independent	630	13.80	
East Central Guadalcanal	7,458	Reuben Tovutovu	Independent	606	13.30	
East Central Guadalcanal	7,458	Molia Gemali	Independent	392	8.60	
East Central Guadalcanal	7,458	Abel Arambola	Independent	330	7.20	
East Central Guadalcanal	7,458	Mark Gatu	Independent	155	3.40	
East Central Guadalcanal	7,458	Eric Thogole	Independent	108	2.40	
East Central Guadalcanal	7,458	Nathaniel Mara	Independent	75	1.60	
East Central Guadalcanal	7,458	Job Maneka Geseni	Independent	44	1.00	
East Central Guadalcanal	7,458	Kamilo Kevin Gaoma	Independent	40	0.90	
East Central Guadalcanal	7,458	Rejected votes		98	2.10	
East Choiseul	4,000	Mannaseh Sogavare	Ownership, Unity and Responsibility Party	1,913	71.80	Re-elected
East Choiseul	4,000	Moses Kurebose Biliki	People's Alliance Party	384	14.40	
East Choiseul	4,000	Sheperd Lapo	National Party	248	9.30	
East Choiseul	4,000	Hence Vaekesa	People's Congress Party	100	3.80	
East Choiseul	4,000	Rejected votes		20	0.80	
East Guadalcanal	7,318	Bradley Tovosia	Independent	1,630	38.90	Elected
East Guadalcanal	7,318	Sampson Tahuniara	Ownership, Unity and Responsibility Party	818	19.50	
East Guadalcanal	7,318	Johnson Koli	Independent	505	12.00	Unseated
East Guadalcanal	7,318	John Hue	Independent	404	9.60	
East Guadalcanal	7,318	Ezekiel Alebua	Independent	293	7.00	
East Guadalcanal	7,318	Kennedy Hoda	Independent	168	4.00	
East Guadalcanal	7,318	Henry Pechakibo	Independent	153	3.60	
East Guadalcanal	7,318	Joe Tuti Ruriti	Independent	117	2.80	
East Guadalcanal	7,318	Joseph Hikuta'a	Independent	64	1.50	
East Guadalcanal	7,318	Bendick Tova	Independent	40	1.00	
East Honiara	39,985	Douglas Ete	Direct Development Party	3,178	38.60	Elected
East Honiara	39,985	Charles Dausabea	Independent	958	11.60	
East Honiara	39,985	Paul Maenu'u	Independent	913	11.10	
East Honiara	39,985	David Jack Maesua	Independent	912	11.10	
East Honiara	39,985	Simeon Bouro	Independent	678	8.20	
East Honiara	39,985	Geofferry Faisi Samuel	Ownership, Unity and Responsibility Party	655	8.00	
East Honiara	39,985	Wycliff Ene	Independent	323	3.90	
East Honiara	39,985	Thompson Guralaua	Independent	246	3.00	
East Honiara	39,985	Catherine Adifaka	Independent	146	1.80	
East Honiara	39,985	John Nelson Ross	Independent	105	1.30	
East Honiara	39,985	John Laosao	Independent	62	0.80	
East Honiara	39,985	Eddie Misi	Independent	28	0.30	
East Honiara	39,985	Rejected votes		25	0.30	
East Kwaio	10,448	Stanley Festus Sofu	Solomon Islands Democratic Party	3,973	67.70	Re-elected
East Kwaio	10,448	Alfred Solomon Sasako	Independent	1,581	27.00	
East Kwaio	10,448	Herrick Dennie	Independent	190	3.20	
East Kwaio	10,448	Solomon Amos Morisudah	Independent	20	0.30	
East Kwaio	10,448	Rejected votes		101	1.70	
East Makira	8,473	Alfred Ghiro	Solomon Islands Democratic Party	1,480	22.90	Elected
East Makira	8,473	Martin Karani	Independent	842	13.00	
East Makira	8,473	Daniel Wagatora	Independent	761	11.80	
East Makira	8,473	John Mamafe	Ownership, Unity and Responsibility Party	747	11.60	
East Makira	8,473	Nathaniel P. Waka'a	Independent	595	9.20	
East Makira	8,473	Otto M. Kuper	Independent	441	6.80	
East Makira	8,473	Warren Tereqora	Independent	372	5.80	
East Makira	8,473	Nicholas K. Gapiara	Independent	344	5.30	
East Makira	8,473	Stanley S. Siapu	Rural and Urban Political Party	255	3.90	
East Makira	8,473	Fred P. Fanua	Independent	176	2.70	
East Makira	8,473	Stevenson Piringisau	Independent	168	2.60	
East Makira	8,473	Henry J. K. Sitai	Independent	124	1.90	
East Makira	8,473	Henry S. Kuata	Independent	85	1.30	
East Makira	8,473	Thomas Bea	Independent	46	0.70	
East Makira	8,473	Rejected votes		30	0.50	
East Malaita	8,231	Manasseh Maelanga	Solomon Islands Democratic Party	2,845	71.00	Re-elected
East Malaita	8,231	Lloyd Gwee Toribaeko	Independent	465	11.60	
East Malaita	8,231	David Toifai Misitomu	Independent	285	7.10	
East Malaita	8,231	Wilfred Bello Faari	Independent	125	3.10	
East Malaita	8,231	Ezekiel Korai	Independent	123	3.10	
East Malaita	8,231	Philistus Olo Fafoi	Independent	70	1.70	
East Malaita	8,231	Sade Oge	Independent	64	1.60	
East Malaita	8,231	Rejected votes		28	0.70	
Fataleka	10,166	Steve William Abana	Solomon Islands Democratic Party	1,954	34.20	Re-elected
Fataleka	10,166	Felix Taloinao Laumae Kabini	Independent	978	17.10	
Fataleka	10,166	Solomon Auga	Independent	927	16.20	
Fataleka	10,166	Thomas Ifuimae	Ownership, Unity and Responsibility Party	587	10.30	
Fataleka	10,166	Gregson Genesis Angisia	Independent	422	7.40	
Fataleka	10,166	Jeniffer Fugui	Independent	216	3.80	
Fataleka	10,166	Allen Siau	Independent	199	3.50	
Fataleka	10,166	John Ruruka	Independent	49	0.90	
Fataleka	10,166	Peter Bubulu	Independent	14	0.20	
Fataleka	10,166	Rejected votes		364	6.40	
Gao/Bugotu	5,531	Samuel Manetoali	Rural and Urban Political Party	2,479	66.70	Re-elected
Gao/Bugotu	5,531	Rhoda Sikilabu	People's Congress Party	564	15.20	
Gao/Bugotu	5,531	Derick Kolinahiga	Independent	494	13.30	
Gao/Bugotu	5,531	Moffet B Tupi	Ownership, Unity and Responsibility Party	111	3.00	
Gao/Bugotu	5,531	Patteson Riumono	Independent	31	0.80	
Gao/Bugotu	5,531	Basil Manelegua	Independent Democratic Party	21	0.60	
Gao/Bugotu	5,531	Ian Aujare	Independent	5	0.10	
Gao/Bugotu	5,531	Rejected votes		9	0.20	
Gizo/Kolombangara	9,078	Gordon Darcy Lilo	Solomon Islands Party for Rural Advancement	1,942	39.60	Re-elected
Gizo/Kolombangara	9,078	Kenneth Bule Hite	Ownership, Unity and Responsibility Party	905	18.50	
Gizo/Kolombangara	9,078	Daniel Kennedy	Independent	520	10.60	
Gizo/Kolombangara	9,078	Warren Paia	Independent	342	7.00	
Gizo/Kolombangara	9,078	Mockson Aaron	Independent	307	6.30	
Gizo/Kolombangara	9,078	Jackson Piasi	Independent	140	2.90	
Gizo/Kolombangara	9,078	George Tataio	Independent	123	2.50	
Gizo/Kolombangara	9,078	Ernest Kenji Sato	Independent	120	2.40	
Gizo/Kolombangara	9,078	Robins Mesepitu	Independent	115	2.30	
Gizo/Kolombangara	9,078	Mark Kale	Independent	101	2.10	
Gizo/Kolombangara	9,078	Reuben Lilo	Independent	65	1.30	
Gizo/Kolombangara	9,078	Ian Roni Gina	Independent	41	0.80	
Gizo/Kolombangara	9,078	Ishmelly Kevu	Independent	31	0.60	
Gizo/Kolombangara	9,078	Komoe Toma	Independent	30	0.60	
Gizo/Kolombangara	9,078	Rejected votes		116	2.40	
Hograno/Kia/Havulei	5,749	Selwyn Riumana	Independent	1,461	35.20	Re-elected
Hograno/Kia/Havulei	5,749	Dudley Lonamei	Independent	928	22.30	
Hograno/Kia/Havulei	5,749	Dick Daoleni	Solomon Islands Democratic Party	636	15.30	
Hograno/Kia/Havulei	5,749	Jane Magata Tozaka	Independent	447	10.80	
Hograno/Kia/Havulei	5,749	George Ngumi Goi	Independent	257	6.20	
Hograno/Kia/Havulei	5,749	Eddie Ene	Ownership, Unity and Responsibility Party	252	6.10	
Hograno/Kia/Havulei	5,749	Nelson Kehe Kile	Independent	99	2.40	
Hograno/Kia/Havulei	5,749	Peter Mcpherson	Independent	32	0.80	
Hograno/Kia/Havulei	5,749	Atkin Bera	Solomon Islands Liberal Party	12	0.30	
Hograno/Kia/Havulei	5,749	Reuben Natowan	Independent	9	0.20	
Hograno/Kia/Havulei	5,749	Rejected votes		20	0.50	
Lau/Mbaelelea	16,740	Walter Folotalu	Solomon Islands Democratic Party	2,370	25.80	Re-elected
Lau/Mbaelelea	16,740	Augustine Auga	Independent	1,482	16.10	
Lau/Mbaelelea	16,740	John Meke	Independent	1,219	13.30	
Lau/Mbaelelea	16,740	Judson Lee Leafasia	Independent	1,198	13.00	
Lau/Mbaelelea	16,740	Toata Molea	Independent	1,064	11.60	
Lau/Mbaelelea	16,740	Charles Ferania Sale	Independent	724	7.90	
Lau/Mbaelelea	16,740	John Dominic Gela	Independent	380	4.10	
Lau/Mbaelelea	16,740	Silver Mango	Independent	322	3.50	
Lau/Mbaelelea	16,740	Philip Solodia Seni	Independent	294	3.20	
Lau/Mbaelelea	16,740	Leslie Lazarus	Independent	59	0.60	
Lau/Mbaelelea	16,740	Fagal Aengari	Independent	25	0.30	
Lau/Mbaelelea	16,740	Rejected votes		60	0.70	
Malaita Outer Islands	2,913	Martin Kealoe	Solomon Islands Democratic Party	739	45.20	Elected
Malaita Outer Islands	2,913	Hugo Kahano	Independent	496	30.30	
Malaita Outer Islands	2,913	Patrick Vahoe	Independent	230	14.10	Unseated
Malaita Outer Islands	2,913	David Holosivi	Independent	73	4.50	
Malaita Outer Islands	2,913	Reginald W Aipia	Independent	69	4.20	
Malaita Outer Islands	2,913	Thomas Sapivaka	Independent	4	0.20	
Malaita Outer Islands	2,913	Rodger D Tauariki	Independent	4	0.20	
Malaita Outer Islands	2,913	Rejected votes		21	1.30	
Maringe/Kokota	5,665	Varian Lonamei	Independent Democratic Party	1,385	32.60	Re-elected
Maringe/Kokota	5,665	Culwick Togamana	Solomon Islands Party for Rural Advancement	996	23.50	
Maringe/Kokota	5,665	Leslie Kikolo	People's Federation Party	913	21.50	
Maringe/Kokota	5,665	Tione Bugotu	Rural and Urban Political Party	317	7.50	
Maringe/Kokota	5,665	Moses Sasago	Ownership, Unity and Responsibility Party	246	5.80	
Maringe/Kokota	5,665	Samson Aumae	People's Alliance Party	213	5.00	
Maringe/Kokota	5,665	John Colridge Lolly	Solomon Islands Party for Rural Advancement	72	1.70	
Maringe/Kokota	5,665	Rachel Theotahigna	Independent	41	1.00	
Maringe/Kokota	5,665	John Charlie Sotamana	Independent	26	0.60	
Maringe/Kokota	5,665	Clement Rojumana	People's Alliance Party	22	0.50	
Maringe/Kokota	5,665	Rejected votes		11	0.30	
Marovo	10,361	Snyder Rini	Independent Democratic Party	2,520	37.10	Re-elected
Marovo	10,361	Philemon Riti	Independent	1,426	21.00	
Marovo	10,361	Ivan Kerovo Ngai	Ownership, Unity and Responsibility Party	720	10.60	
Marovo	10,361	Undikolo Pelobule	Independent	482	7.10	
Marovo	10,361	Atabani Tahu	Independent	386	5.70	
Marovo	10,361	Edward Tokuru	Independent	342	5.00	
Marovo	10,361	Eric Hivae	Independent	306	4.50	
Marovo	10,361	Milikada Miller Silas	Independent	235	3.50	
Marovo	10,361	Hellen Saera Hilli	Independent	215	3.20	
Marovo	10,361	Denton Dino Bennie	Independent	83	1.20	
Marovo	10,361	Spama Runialo Sialo	Independent	59	0.90	
Marovo	10,361	Lore Reuben	Independent	2	0.00	
Marovo	10,361	Rejected votes		24	0.40	
Nggela	10,868	Mark Roboliu Kemakeza	Independent	1,966	24.40	Re-elected
Nggela	10,868	Johnley T. Hatimoana	National Party	1,843	22.90	
Nggela	10,868	Christian Salini	Solomon Islands Party for Rural Advancement	1,522	18.90	
Nggela	10,868	Clement Rexley Kakango	People's Alliance Party	1,079	13.40	
Nggela	10,868	Ronald M. Unusi	Solomon Islands Democratic Party	634	7.90	
Nggela	10,868	Bartholomew Parapolo	Ownership, Unity and Responsibility Party	506	6.30	
Nggela	10,868	Alfred Pohe	Independent	231	2.90	
Nggela	10,868	Daniel A. Parapolo	Independent	88	1.10	
Nggela	10,868	Catherine Ann Pule	People's Congress Party	74	0.90	
Nggela	10,868	John Gorosi	Independent	30	0.40	
Nggela	10,868	Fred Samora	New Nation Party	28	0.30	
Nggela	10,868	Cecil Ono	Solomon Islands Liberal Party	8	0.10	
Nggela	10,868	Rejected votes		34	0.40	
North East Guadalcanal	7,763	Derek Sikua	Solomon Islands Liberal Party	2,535	57.00	Re-elected
North East Guadalcanal	7,763	Alfred Mane Ngelea Lovanitilia	Independent	887	19.90	
North East Guadalcanal	7,763	Henry Saea	Independent	317	7.10	
North East Guadalcanal	7,763	Ishmael Robert Leuape	Ownership, Unity and Responsibility Party	241	5.40	
North East Guadalcanal	7,763	Brally Jim Tavalia	Independent	217	4.90	
North East Guadalcanal	7,763	Farral Wilfred	Independent	209	4.70	
North East Guadalcanal	7,763	Rejected votes		43	1.00	
North Guadalcanal	8,484	Martin Sopage	Independent	1,489	31.20	Re-elected
North Guadalcanal	8,484	Alfred Maeke Junior	Independent	940	19.70	
North Guadalcanal	8,484	Daniel Vedar Buto	Independent	611	12.80	
North Guadalcanal	8,484	Andrew Kuvu	Independent	574	12.00	
North Guadalcanal	8,484	Samson Maneka	Independent	373	7.80	
North Guadalcanal	8,484	Benedict Garimane	Independent	254	5.30	
North Guadalcanal	8,484	Greenta Vienna Tome	Ownership, Unity and Responsibility Party	231	4.80	
North Guadalcanal	8,484	John Rossivaena	Independent	154	3.20	
North Guadalcanal	8,484	Harry Barnabas	Independent	64	1.30	
North Guadalcanal	8,484	David Qwan	Independent	20	0.40	
North Guadalcanal	8,484	Edmond Sonitavea	Independent	16	0.30	
North Guadalcanal	8,484	Stephen Paeni	Independent	15	0.30	
North Guadalcanal	8,484	Rejected votes		37	0.80	
North Malaita	9,188	Jimmy Lusibaea	Independent	3,091	49.60	Elected
North Malaita	9,188	Michael Maeliau	Independent	882	14.20	
North Malaita	9,188	Leslie Leau Kwaiga	Independent	813	13.00	
North Malaita	9,188	Daniel E. Kwanairara	Independent	566	9.10	Unseated
North Malaita	9,188	Mahlon Oduramo Suilifia	Independent	342	5.50	
North Malaita	9,188	Sensie George	Independent	296	4.80	
North Malaita	9,188	Joel Moffat Konofilia	Independent	102	1.60	
North Malaita	9,188	Raymond Aumae	Independent	64	1.00	
North Malaita	9,188	Lawrence Foanaota	Ownership, Unity and Responsibility Party	55	0.90	
North Malaita	9,188	Rejected votes		19	0.30	
North New Georgia	2,705	Job Dudley Tausinga	Solomon Islands Party for Rural Advancement	1,419	73.90	Re-elected
North New Georgia	2,705	Dewin Alick	Independent	458	23.90	
North New Georgia	2,705	Nuatali Tongarutu	Independent	36	1.90	
North New Georgia	2,705	Rejected votes		7	0.40	
North Vella Lavella	3,764	Milner Tozaka	Independent	1,225	45.00	Re-elected
North Vella Lavella	3,764	Pye Robert Kuve	Independent	1,082	39.70	
North Vella Lavella	3,764	Alistair Porebangara Paekera	Independent	292	10.70	
North Vella Lavella	3,764	Maleli Zalao	Independent	64	2.30	
North Vella Lavella	3,764	Casper Dorauvo	Independent	40	1.50	
North Vella Lavella	3,764	Gwen Abana Jitukalo	Independent	12	0.40	
North Vella Lavella	3,764	Rejected votes		9	0.30	
North West Choiseul	6,208	Connelly Sadakabatu	Independent	1,408	30.00	Elected
North West Choiseul	6,208	Francis Qalo	Ownership, Unity and Responsibility Party	1,151	24.50	
North West Choiseul	6,208	Ralph Billy Takubala	Independent	1,027	21.90	
North West Choiseul	6,208	Clement Pikabatu Kengava	People's Alliance Party	775	16.50	Unseated
North West Choiseul	6,208	Alpha Kimata	Solomon Islands Democratic Party	206	4.40	
North West Choiseul	6,208	Sylvia Nowak Anderson	Independent	113	2.40	
North West Choiseul	6,208	Rejected votes		12	0.30	
North West Guadalcanal	8,238	Horst Heinz Bodo Dettke	Independent	2,228	41.30	Elected
North West Guadalcanal	8,238	Siriako Usa	Independent	1,382	25.60	Unseated
North West Guadalcanal	8,238	Joseph Pali Neilsen	Independent	507	9.40	
North West Guadalcanal	8,238	Charles Brown Beu	Independent	456	8.50	
North West Guadalcanal	8,238	Solomon Love	Independent	270	5.00	
North West Guadalcanal	8,238	Francis Mocho Belande Sade	Direct Development Party	176	3.30	
North West Guadalcanal	8,238	Hilda Padavera Kii	Independent	117	2.20	
North West Guadalcanal	8,238	Charles Keku Chilivi	Independent	82	1.50	
North West Guadalcanal	8,238	Michael Ben Walahoula	Independent	54	1.00	
North West Guadalcanal	8,238	Stephen Labu	Independent	48	0.90	
North West Guadalcanal	8,238	Joseph Solomon Anea	Ownership, Unity and Responsibility Party	14	0.30	
North West Guadalcanal	8,238	John Quan	Independent	12	0.20	
North West Guadalcanal	8,238	Craig Pelu	Independent	9	0.20	
North West Guadalcanal	8,238	George Kavoa	Independent	6	0.10	
North West Guadalcanal	8,238	Rejected votes		32	0.60	
Ranongga/Simbo	5,730	Charles Sigoto	Reform Democratic Party	1,485	38.40	Elected
Ranongga/Simbo	5,730	Francis Billy Hilly	National Party	1,277	33.00	Unseated
Ranongga/Simbo	5,730	Belani Tekulu	New Nation Party	697	18.00	
Ranongga/Simbo	5,730	Elizabeth Tamugula Pearson	Ownership, Unity and Responsibility Party	254	6.60	
Ranongga/Simbo	5,730	Stephen Suti-Agalo	Solomon Islands Liberal Party	118	3.10	
Ranongga/Simbo	5,730	Rejected votes		33	0.90	
Rennell/Bellona	3,386	Seth Gukuna	People's Congress Party	882	47.50	Re-elected
Rennell/Bellona	3,386	Puia Tuhanuku	Independent	278	15.00	
Rennell/Bellona	3,386	Timothy Johnston	Independent	157	8.50	
Rennell/Bellona	3,386	Charlie Tango	Independent	154	8.30	
Rennell/Bellona	3,386	Collin Tesuatai	Independent	142	7.70	
Rennell/Bellona	3,386	Clive Sunga Tuimaka	Independent	93	5.00	
Rennell/Bellona	3,386	Nollan Teika	Independent	75	4.00	
Rennell/Bellona	3,386	Jay Kabei	Independent	59	3.20	
Rennell/Bellona	3,386	Rejected votes		15	0.80	
Russells/Savo	6,892	Dickson Mua Panakitasi	Ownership, Unity and Responsibility Party	1,840	42.50	Elected
Russells/Savo	6,892	Allan Kemakeza	People's Alliance Party	1,649	38.00	Unseated
Russells/Savo	6,892	Reginald Hill Kokili	Solomon Islands Democratic Party	325	7.50	
Russells/Savo	6,892	Sterry Leni Kuatavem	Independent	312	7.20	
Russells/Savo	6,892	Baptise Tura	Independent	180	4.20	
Russells/Savo	6,892	Rejected votes		28	0.60	
Shortland	2,939	Steve Laore	Independent	1,073	49.30	Elected
Shortland	2,939	Augustine Taneko	Independent	901	41.40	Unseated
Shortland	2,939	Albert Bakale Laore	Independent	136	6.30	
Shortland	2,939	Derick Pako	Independent	12	0.60	
Shortland	2,939	Ronnie Kidoe	Independent	5	0.20	
Shortland	2,939	Ninamo Otuana	Independent	5	0.20	
Shortland	2,939	Queensland Olega	Ownership, Unity and Responsibility Party	1	0.00	
Shortland	2,939	Rejected votes		43	2.00	
Small Malaita	11,774	Rick Houenipwela	Solomon Islands Democratic Party	1,677	24.60	Elected
Small Malaita	11,774	William Nii Haomae	Independent	1,606	23.50	Unseated
Small Malaita	11,774	Edwin Awaioli	Ownership, Unity and Responsibility Party	825	12.10	
Small Malaita	11,774	Rudolf Henry Dora	Independent	725	10.60	
Small Malaita	11,774	Patrick Wate	Independent	567	8.30	
Small Malaita	11,774	Christopher Wate	Independent	415	6.10	
Small Malaita	11,774	Alex Bartlett	Independent	303	4.40	
Small Malaita	11,774	Elizah Owa	Independent	283	4.10	
Small Malaita	11,774	Matthew Fakaia	Independent	173	2.50	
Small Malaita	11,774	Willie Fa'asu	Independent	47	0.70	
Small Malaita	11,774	Lyndon Wateitohi	Independent	37	0.50	
Small Malaita	11,774	James Henry Star Dora	People's Alliance Party	31	0.50	
Small Malaita	11,774	Leslie Anthony Saru	Independent	30	0.40	
Small Malaita	11,774	Clement Honiola	Independent	13	0.20	
Small Malaita	11,774	Joseph Wane	Independent	13	0.20	
Small Malaita	11,774	Rejected votes		77	1.10	
South Choiseul	5,581	Elizah Doro Muala	Solomon Islands Party for Rural Advancement	635	17.50	Elected
South Choiseul	5,581	Jackson Kiloe	Independent	524	14.50	
South Choiseul	5,581	Robertson Erere Galokale	Independent	497	13.70	
South Choiseul	5,581	Noah Zala	Independent	442	12.20	
South Choiseul	5,581	Wilson Pita	Ownership, Unity and Responsibility Party	416	11.50	
South Choiseul	5,581	Cromwell Qopoto	Ownership, Unity and Responsibility Party	214	5.90	
South Choiseul	5,581	Michael Collin Pitakaka	Independent	213	5.90	
South Choiseul	5,581	Alick Sogati	Independent	196	5.40	
South Choiseul	5,581	Bradley Pitanoe	Independent	161	4.40	
South Choiseul	5,581	Atkin Vilaka	Independent	100	2.80	
South Choiseul	5,581	Walter Katovai	Independent	73	2.00	
South Choiseul	5,581	Caleb Kotali	Independent	69	1.90	
South Choiseul	5,581	Collish Leketo Tutua	Reform Democratic Party	55	1.50	
South Choiseul	5,581	Rejected votes		30	0.80	
South Guadalcanal	6,131	David Day Pacha	Solomon Islands Democratic Party	1,941	49.80	Re-elected
South Guadalcanal	6,131	Cornelius Vonseu	Independent	662	17.00	
South Guadalcanal	6,131	Andrew Donua Muaki	Independent	643	16.50	
South Guadalcanal	6,131	Francis Peter Para	National Party	190	4.90	
South Guadalcanal	6,131	Jack Israel Bana	Independent	153	3.90	
South Guadalcanal	6,131	Martin Tsuki	Solomon Islands Liberal Party	66	1.70	
South Guadalcanal	6,131	Marx Lua Tova	Independent	64	1.60	
South Guadalcanal	6,131	Charles Aiwosuga Cheka'a	Independent	58	1.50	
South Guadalcanal	6,131	Karnol Kalea Sala	Independent	44	1.10	
South Guadalcanal	6,131	Victor Totu	Independent	22	0.60	
South Guadalcanal	6,131	Allastair Teava	Independent	16	0.40	
South Guadalcanal	6,131	Joshua Karichi	Independent	9	0.20	
South Guadalcanal	6,131	Betty Lirma Gigisi	Independent	5	0.10	
South Guadalcanal	6,131	Ron Lawson Meke	Independent	3	0.10	
South Guadalcanal	6,131	Rejected votes		18	0.50	
South New Georgia/Rendova/Tetepari	6,138	Danny Philip	Reform Democratic Party	1,579	39.10	Elected
South New Georgia/Rendova/Tetepari	6,138	Francis John Zama	Ownership, Unity and Responsibility Party	1,050	26.00	Unseated
South New Georgia/Rendova/Tetepari	6,138	David Lani Gina	Independent	535	13.30	
South New Georgia/Rendova/Tetepari	6,138	Simba Paza	Independent	306	7.60	
South New Georgia/Rendova/Tetepari	6,138	Aseri Tamana	Independent	297	7.40	
South New Georgia/Rendova/Tetepari	6,138	Elizah R. Hoe	Independent	113	2.80	
South New Georgia/Rendova/Tetepari	6,138	Nairy Alamu	Independent	98	2.40	
South New Georgia/Rendova/Tetepari	6,138	Doreen Linga	Independent	28	0.70	
South New Georgia/Rendova/Tetepari	6,138	Rejected votes		29	0.70	
South Vella Lavella	5,160	Lional Alex	Independent	997	26.30	Elected
South Vella Lavella	5,160	Trevor Olavae	Independent	832	22.00	Unseated
South Vella Lavella	5,160	Jennings Movobule	Independent	824	21.70	
South Vella Lavella	5,160	Milton B. Sibisobere	Independent	815	21.50	
South Vella Lavella	5,160	Roland Mae	Independent	182	4.80	
South Vella Lavella	5,160	Kelly Levi	Independent	117	3.10	
South Vella Lavella	5,160	Rejected votes		23	0.60	
Temotu Nende	6,720	Commins Aston Mewa	Independent	1,467	29.80	Elected
Temotu Nende	6,720	John Patterson Oti	Ownership, Unity and Responsibility Party	1,198	24.30	Unseated
Temotu Nende	6,720	Philip Mali	Rural Development Party	897	18.20	
Temotu Nende	6,720	Freddy Me'esa	Independent	570	11.60	
Temotu Nende	6,720	Edward Daiwo	Solomon Islands Democratic Party	251	5.10	
Temotu Nende	6,720	James Mekab	People's Alliance Party	241	4.90	
Temotu Nende	6,720	George Henry Malirbaal	Direct Development Party	202	4.10	
Temotu Nende	6,720	Edwin Meibu	New Nation Party	81	1.60	
Temotu Nende	6,720	Rejected votes		19	0.40	
Temotu Pele	4,512	Martin Teddy Magga	Independent	897	30.60	Re-elected
Temotu Pele	4,512	Michael Maina	Independent	601	20.50	
Temotu Pele	4,512	Nelson Nimelea	Independent	484	16.50	
Temotu Pele	4,512	Alfred Apela Toaki	Independent	259	8.80	
Temotu Pele	4,512	David Dalaume	Independent	169	5.80	
Temotu Pele	4,512	George Boape	Independent	118	4.00	
Temotu Pele	4,512	Alfred Dagi	Independent	113	3.90	
Temotu Pele	4,512	Joe Atkin Leiau	Independent	88	3.00	
Temotu Pele	4,512	Philip Nadu	Independent	79	2.70	
Temotu Pele	4,512	Ross Hepworth	Independent	58	2.00	
Temotu Pele	4,512	Johnson Levela	Independent	23	0.80	
Temotu Pele	4,512	Oliver Melive Osi	Ownership, Unity and Responsibility Party	16	0.50	
Temotu Pele	4,512	George West	Independent	9	0.30	
Temotu Pele	4,512	Rejected votes		21	0.70	
Temotu Vatud	3,830	Clay Forau Soalaoi	Independent	602	25.20	Re-elected
Temotu Vatud	3,830	Noel Aisa	Independent	400	16.70	
Temotu Vatud	3,830	Walter Mavaemua	Independent	254	10.60	
Temotu Vatud	3,830	Afetama Steven Torro	Independent	206	8.60	
Temotu Vatud	3,830	Chriss Patty	Independent	131	5.50	
Temotu Vatud	3,830	Timothy Walter Titiulu	Independent	118	4.90	
Temotu Vatud	3,830	Nathan Nukusaumua	Independent	114	4.80	
Temotu Vatud	3,830	Casper Muna Tofimao	Independent	114	4.80	
Temotu Vatud	3,830	Patrick Mundano	Independent	113	4.70	
Temotu Vatud	3,830	Samuel Kafukese	Independent	101	4.20	
Temotu Vatud	3,830	Gordon H. Bila	Ownership, Unity and Responsibility Party	62	2.60	
Temotu Vatud	3,830	Jeffrey Teava	Independent	56	2.30	
Temotu Vatud	3,830	Phillip S. Tuapa	Independent	37	1.50	
Temotu Vatud	3,830	Samson Rangi Ariki	Independent	27	1.10	
Temotu Vatud	3,830	Michael Meone	Independent	26	1.10	
Temotu Vatud	3,830	Frank L. Kataina	Independent	10	0.40	
Temotu Vatud	3,830	James Rafe Mua	Independent	9	0.40	
Temotu Vatud	3,830	Lazarus Munamua	Independent	2	0.10	
Temotu Vatud	3,830	Rejected votes		9	0.40	
Ulawa/Ugi	3,664	James Tora	Independent	641	26.00	Re-elected
Ulawa/Ugi	3,664	Nathaniel Rahumae Waena	National Party	563	22.80	
Ulawa/Ugi	3,664	Noel Mamau	Independent	291	11.80	
Ulawa/Ugi	3,664	Carl Warren Beldon	Independent	214	8.70	
Ulawa/Ugi	3,664	Augustine Waetara	Independent	182	7.40	
Ulawa/Ugi	3,664	Peter Titiulu	Independent	116	4.70	
Ulawa/Ugi	3,664	Henry Marau	Independent	94	3.80	
Ulawa/Ugi	3,664	Ashley Rohorua Riwenimae	Independent	89	3.60	
Ulawa/Ugi	3,664	Michael Ramsey Poki	Ownership, Unity and Responsibility Party	80	3.20	
Ulawa/Ugi	3,664	Wilfred Robertson Natei	Independent	66	2.70	
Ulawa/Ugi	3,664	Meffrey Awao	Independent	51	2.10	
Ulawa/Ugi	3,664	Raphael Oli	Independent	39	1.60	
Ulawa/Ugi	3,664	Fox Cornes Sumaheniau	Independent	26	1.10	
Ulawa/Ugi	3,664	Joseph Harry Maka'a	Independent	5	0.20	
Ulawa/Ugi	3,664	Rejected votes		7	0.30	
West ꞌAreꞌare	6,209	John Maneniaru	Independent	1,281	32.20	Elected
West ꞌAreꞌare	6,209	Severino Nuaiasi	Independent	1,178	29.60	Unseated
West ꞌAreꞌare	6,209	Martin Tome Haikau	Independent	406	10.20	
West ꞌAreꞌare	6,209	Campion Ohasio	Ownership, Unity and Responsibility Party	259	6.50	
West ꞌAreꞌare	6,209	Andrew Nori	Independent	190	4.80	
West ꞌAreꞌare	6,209	Samson Maeniuta Rihuoha	Independent	175	4.40	
West ꞌAreꞌare	6,209	Peter Hauia	Independent	161	4.10	
West ꞌAreꞌare	6,209	Paul Rasuhiraro Opaka	Independent	146	3.70	
West ꞌAreꞌare	6,209	Slayde Waiwaki Ehakeni	Independent	130	3.30	
West ꞌAreꞌare	6,209	Joe Timothy Ariaria	Independent	34	0.90	
West ꞌAreꞌare	6,209	Rejected votes		15	0.40	
West Guadalcanal	5,652	Moses Garu	Solomon Islands Democratic Party	1,006	23.20	Elected
West Guadalcanal	5,652	Pascal Belamataga	Independent	840	19.30	
West Guadalcanal	5,652	Anthony Kamu Veke	Ownership, Unity and Responsibility Party	778	17.90	
West Guadalcanal	5,652	Peter S. Haeo	Independent	466	10.70	
West Guadalcanal	5,652	David Rosalio	Independent	451	10.40	
West Guadalcanal	5,652	Samson Teteha	Independent	245	5.60	
West Guadalcanal	5,652	Obadiah Gadi	Independent	201	4.60	
West Guadalcanal	5,652	Joshua Bulolo	Independent	165	3.80	
West Guadalcanal	5,652	Edme Ziokera	Independent	101	2.30	
West Guadalcanal	5,652	Silas Devine Gift Lauvisu	Solomon Islands Liberal Party	20	0.50	
West Guadalcanal	5,652	George W. Mangale	Solomon Islands Party for Rural Advancement	1	0.00	
West Guadalcanal	5,652	Rejected votes		70	1.60	
West Honiara	32,702	Namson Tran	Independent	4,499	56.60	Elected
West Honiara	32,702	Isaac Inoke Tosika	Ownership, Unity and Responsibility Party	1,552	19.50	Unseated
West Honiara	32,702	Alfred Soaki	Independent	892	11.20	
West Honiara	32,702	Catherine Sheardown Atanikakia	Independent	516	6.50	
West Honiara	32,702	Andrew Mua	Independent	299	3.80	
West Honiara	32,702	Toxi Polyn	Independent	103	1.30	
West Honiara	32,702	Rejected votes		90	1.10	
West Kwaio	6,382	Peter Tom	Solomon Islands Democratic Party	1,550	34.80	Re-elected
West Kwaio	6,382	Augustine Lafo	Independent	790	17.70	
West Kwaio	6,382	Jack Ofoata	Independent	611	13.70	
West Kwaio	6,382	Mathias Olofia	Independent	387	8.70	
West Kwaio	6,382	Fred Sisifiu	Independent	303	6.80	
West Kwaio	6,382	Harry Kwalafunu	Ownership, Unity and Responsibility Party	253	5.70	
West Kwaio	6,382	Robert Wales Feraltelia	Independent	126	2.80	
West Kwaio	6,382	Alfred Afeau	Independent	125	2.80	
West Kwaio	6,382	Charles Karaori	Independent	118	2.70	
West Kwaio	6,382	Fred Saega	Independent	59	1.30	
West Kwaio	6,382	Tony Uania	Independent	57	1.30	
West Kwaio	6,382	Henry Dada	Independent	40	0.90	
West Kwaio	6,382	Anderson K. Raenaitoro	Independent	14	0.30	
West Kwaio	6,382	Rejected votes		18	0.40	
West Kwara'ae	13,993	Sam Shemuel Iduri	Solomon Islands Democratic Party	1,451	18.40	Re-elected
West Kwara'ae	13,993	Martin Saefafia	Independent	1,015	12.80	
West Kwara'ae	13,993	Jack Kaota	Independent	961	12.20	
West Kwara'ae	13,993	Sam Alasia	Independent	827	10.50	
West Kwara'ae	13,993	Casper Kosute'e Dausabea	Independent	789	10.00	
West Kwara'ae	13,993	Allan Tori Tomu	Independent	631	8.00	
West Kwara'ae	13,993	Martin Aebata	Independent	614	7.80	
West Kwara'ae	13,993	Paul Kukute Daokalia	Independent	461	5.80	
West Kwara'ae	13,993	Martin Fini	Independent	337	4.30	
West Kwara'ae	13,993	Simon Mannie	Independent	251	3.20	
West Kwara'ae	13,993	Augustine Faliomea Maelifaka	Independent	207	2.60	
West Kwara'ae	13,993	Erickson Otia	Independent	64	0.80	
West Kwara'ae	13,993	Fred Maniau	Independent	63	0.80	
West Kwara'ae	13,993	John Alfred Tuasulia	Independent	63	0.80	
West Kwara'ae	13,993	Henry Tagini Anita	Independent	58	0.70	
West Kwara'ae	13,993	Robert Madeo	Independent	35	0.40	
West Kwara'ae	13,993	Jared Daudau Tagini	Independent	29	0.40	
West Kwara'ae	13,993	Leslie Osimae	Independent	8	0.10	
West Kwara'ae	13,993	Rejected votes		40	0.50	
West Makira	6,425	Dick Ha'amori	Direct Development Party	871	18.50	Elected
West Makira	6,425	Jackson Sunaone	Independent	788	16.80	
West Makira	6,425	Paul Marita	Independent	518	11.00	
West Makira	6,425	Japhet Waipora	Ownership, Unity and Responsibility Party	377	8.00	Unseated
West Makira	6,425	James Morea	Independent	331	7.00	
West Makira	6,425	Jimmy Hanson Riunga	Independent	327	7.00	
West Makira	6,425	Daniel Dautaha	Independent	310	6.60	
West Makira	6,425	Golden Kiloko	Independent	271	5.80	
West Makira	6,425	Nelson Nausi	Independent	227	4.80	
West Makira	6,425	Peter Trena Raraha'abura	Independent	160	3.40	
West Makira	6,425	Edmond Dangi	Independent	134	2.90	
West Makira	6,425	Alick Dangi	Independent	121	2.60	
West Makira	6,425	Richard Taro	Independent	120	2.60	
West Makira	6,425	Jackton Raeri	Independent	92	2.00	
West Makira	6,425	John Mepuke Ta'aru	Independent	36	0.80	
West Makira	6,425	Rejected votes		18	0.40	
West New Georgia/Vona Vona	9,241	Silas Kerry Vaqara Tausinga	Solomon Islands Party for Rural Advancement	1,487	27.50	Elected
West New Georgia/Vona Vona	9,241	Peter James Boyers	Independent	1,327	24.60	Unseated
West New Georgia/Vona Vona	9,241	Aquila Talasasa	Independent	680	12.60	
West New Georgia/Vona Vona	9,241	Gloria Sibisobere	Independent	594	11.00	
West New Georgia/Vona Vona	9,241	Billy Veo	Independent	508	9.40	
West New Georgia/Vona Vona	9,241	Selina Boso	Independent	211	3.90	
West New Georgia/Vona Vona	9,241	Nelson Boso	Independent	186	3.40	
West New Georgia/Vona Vona	9,241	Joseph Douglas	Independent	159	2.90	
West New Georgia/Vona Vona	9,241	Patt R. Loe	Independent	96	1.80	
West New Georgia/Vona Vona	9,241	Milton Talasasa	Independent	84	1.60	
West New Georgia/Vona Vona	9,241	Robertson Bato	Independent	24	0.40	
West New Georgia/Vona Vona	9,241	Wilson Gina	Independent	7	0.10	
West New Georgia/Vona Vona	9,241	Rejected votes		37	0.70	

== Aftermath ==
On 11 August 2009, lobbying was reportedly in progress, as several political groups jockeyed to form a coalition government, with three main camps forming.

The first camp was built around the outgoing government led by Derek Sikua. One of its spokespeople, Matthew Wale, claimed on 13 August that the group has the support of five parties and 30 MPs including the Solomon Islands Democratic Party (12 MPs), the Solomon Islands Party for Rural Advancement (4), the Solomon Islands Liberal Party (1), the People's Congress Party (1), and six independents. This camp was based at the Heritage Hotel.

A second camp was based around three parties: the Ownership, Unity and Responsibility Party led by former Prime Minister Manasseh Sogavare (4 seats); the Direct Development Party led by Dick Ha'amori (3); and the Reform Democratic Party led by former Deputy Prime Minister Danny Philip (2). This camp was based at the Pacific Casino Hotel.

A third camp was led by the newly established Independent Democratic Party (IDP) led by Snyder Rini, and was based at Honiara Hotel. The IDP's party secretary Leonard Kaitu'u explained that the IDP was the successor to a previous party, the Association of Independent Members. Kaitu'u has suggested that their camp will also get support from the People's Alliance Party (PAP) and the Solomon Islands Party for Rural Advancement (SIPRA). It was thought possible that SIPRA would decide to join with the Heritage Hotel camp. A spokesman for the group denied that cash incentives were being used to secure members for the coalition.

Danny Philip was narrowly elected the Prime Minister on 24 August 2010, with 26 votes to 23 for his rival, the Democratic Party's Steve Abana.

In a victory speech following the Prime Ministerial election, Philip stated that his first priority would be to form a new government. He said his government would actively support the country's Constitutional Reform process. This had been one of his central campaign pledges, and the reason why he had formed the Reform Democratic Party.

Upon naming his cabinet, he appointed Manasseh Maelanga as his deputy.
