= People's Power Action Party =

Solomon Islands political party

The Peoples Power Action Party was a political party in the Solomon Islands. The party was launched on February 10, 2010 to support the "underprivileged majority" and advocated the foundation of a micro-finance bank to finance development in the Solomon Islands. Its founding president was Wale Feratelia.
