= Elections in the Solomon Islands =

Elections in the Solomon Islands take place in the context of a constitutional monarchy. A National Parliament consists of 50 members elected by first-past-the-post voting. Ballots include candidate's name, face photo, and symbol associated with their political party or being an independent.

== Electoral system ==
Parliament can be dissolved by a vote of non-confidence, where an absolute majority vote in favor. Parliament is dissolved by the constitution 4 years after the first sitting of Parliament post election. Once parliament is dissolved there is a four months period for an election to be held.

The Electoral Commission is charged with overseeing elections. It is a nonpartisan commission made of three people proposed by the Judicial and Legal Service Commission, then appointed by the governor general. Members of political parties, and current elected officials are barred from the Electoral Commission. The Chief Electoral Officer also sits on the commission but is non-voting. They are the head of the government office in charge of elections. Any bill proposed in parliament related to elections is studied and commented on by the Electoral Commission.

== Constituencies ==
The Solomon Islands is split into 50 single-seat constituencies, decided by the non-partisan Constituency Boundaries Commission and approved by parliament. Made of the Surveyor-General, the head of the Government's Statistical Service and three members appointed by the Governor General. Constituency boundaries are reviewed at least every ten years, and are based on population size, ethnic groups and means of communication.

== Franchise ==
Citizens of the Solomon Islands over the age of eighteen can vote in the constituency they live in. The exceptions to that are if they are sentenced to death or greater than 6 months imprisoned/ supervised, found of unsound mind or had their right to vote revoked by an election crime conviction.

== Eligibility ==
To qualify in a parliamentary election a candidate must be a citizen of the Solomon Islands, be over the age of 21, not be a citizen of another country, cannot have declared bankruptcy in the Commonwealth, is not sentenced to death or more than 6 months of imprisonment/supervision, anywhere in the world, and has not been found to be of unsound mind in the Solomon Islands. The right to vote or be a candidate can be revoked if a person is convicted of an election related crime in the Solomon Islands. The original constitution required that candidates not currently hold public office, in 2018 it was updated to require candidates not have held public office in the 12 months before the nomination deadline. Anyone involved in running an election cannot also be a candidate in the election. The High Court has final say on if a member of parliament is qualified to hold office, and if any member has vacated their seat.

== Political culture ==
Solomon Islands has a multi-party system, with numerous parties in which no one party often has a chance of gaining power alone. Parties must work with each other to form coalition governments.

== See also ==
- List of Solomon Islands by-elections
- List of political parties in the Solomon Islands
