= Christian Alliance Party =

Political party in the Solomon Islands

The Christian Alliance Party was a political party in the Solomon Islands founded in 2005–2006 by Edward Sonia. At the 2006 Solomon Islands general election, the party received 3,613 votes (1.9% of the total) and won no seats.
