= National Party (Solomon Islands) =

The National Party was a political party in the Solomon Islands. At the 2006 general election, the party won 6.9% of the vote and 4 out of 50 seats, which was tied with the Solomon Islands Party for Rural Advancement for the most seats. The party became part of the governing coalition under Prime Minister Manasseh Sogavare.

In August 2006, party leader Francis Billy Hilly was dismissed from the Sogavare cabinet over a memorandum of understanding with the People's Republic of China. Subsequently, six of the seven National Party Members of Parliament resigned from the party.
