= Association of Independent Members =

Political party in the Solomon Islands

The Association of Independent Members of Parliament (AIMP) or Association of Independent Members (AIM) is a political party in the Solomon Islands founded by Tommy Chan in 2001.

At the 2001 elections, the party won 13 out of 50 seats. After the 2006 elections, party member Snyder Rini was elected as Prime Minister despite having lost his seat alongside the rest of the party's MPs. Subsequent riots against him led to his resignation after just eight days.
