= Solomon Islands Party for Rural Advancement =

Solomon Islands Party for Rural Development
- Leader: Gordon Darcy Lilo
- Founded: 2006
- National Parliament: 1 / 50

The Solomon Islands Party for Rural Advancement (SIPRA) is a political party in the Solomon Islands. It was founded in 2006 and is led by Gordon Darcy Lilo. The party was part of the National Coalition for Reform and Advancement, which governed the country between 2010 and 2014, with its leader Lilo being finance minister from 2010 to 2011 and then Prime Minister of Solomon Islands from 2011 to 2014. The party lost all but one seat in the 2014 Solomon Islands general election with Lilo losing his seat to his nephew.

== Election results ==
Election	Votes	%	Seats	+/–
2006	12,030	6.31 (#2)	4 / 50	New
2010	8,074	3.43 (#3)	4 / 50	0
2014	10,022	3.90 (#6)	1 / 50	▼3
2019	9,878	3.19 (#8)	1 / 50	0
2024	15,735	4.55 (#5)	1 / 50	0
