= Gao/Bugotu constituency =

Gao/Bugotu
- Single-member constituency for the National Parliament of the Solomon Islands
- Region: Isabel Province

Current constituency
- Created: 1993
- Current MP: Samuel Manetoali
- Party: Kadere Party

Gao/Bugotu is a single-member constituency of the National Parliament of Solomon Islands. Located on Santa Isabel Island, it was established in 1993 when the National Parliament was expanded from 38 to 47 seats.

== List of MPs ==
Election	MP	Party
1993	Nathaniel Supa	
1997	James Saliga	
2001	Eric Notere	
2006	Samuel Manetoali	
2010	Samuel Manetoali	Rural and Urban Political Party
2014	Samuel Manetoali	Independent
2019	Samuel Manetoali	Kadere Party
2024	Hedley Mahaga	Independent

== Election results ==
=== 2019 ===
2019 general election
Candidate	Party	Votes
Samuel Manetoali	Kadere Party	2,457
Adrian Toni	Democratic Alliance Party	1,102
Daniel Tanochok Sio	Independent	464
Wilson Karamui Bugotu	Independent	308
Allan Kaihe Kilovunagi Tavake	Solomon Islands United Party	208
Ernest Kolly	Green Party	168
Dereck Kolinahiga Kodo	Independent	121
Invalid/blank votes		6
Total		4,834
Registered voters		5,543
Source: Solomon Islands Electoral Commission

=== 2014 ===
2014 general election
Candidate	Party	Votes
Samuel Manetoali	Independent	3,077
Mathias Aula Loji	Independent	890
Derick Kolinahiga	Kadere Party	464
Rhoda Sikilabu	United Democratic Party	370
Basil Manelegua	Youth Owned Rural and Urban Party	11
Invalid/blank votes		63
Total		4,875
Registered voters		
Source: Election Passport

=== 2010 ===
2010 general election
Candidate	Party	Votes
Samuel Manetoali	Rural and Urban Political Party	2,479
Rhoda Sikilabu	People's Congress Party	564
Derick Kolinahiga		494
Moffet B Tupi	Ownership, Unity and Responsibility Party	111
Patteson Riumono		31
Basil Manelegua	Independent Democratic Party	21
Ian Aujare		5
Invalid/blank votes		9
Total		3,714
Registered voters		5,531
Source: Election Passport

=== 2006 ===
2006 general election
Candidate	Party	Votes
Samuel Manetoali		978
Basil Manelegua		306
Nathaniel Supa		301
Warren B Sikilabu		268
Edmund Bourne Gagahe		234
Trasel Gilbert		202
Eric Notere		178
Nicholas Lolita		171
Doris Bava		97
John Patteson Bako		97
William Manepolo		74
Ian Aujare		54
Nathaniel Gudfraede		42
John Salano		34
Ambrose H Bugotu		11
Invalid/blank votes		47
Total		3,094
Registered voters		4,758
Source: Election Passport

=== 2001 ===
2001 general election
Candidate	Party	Votes
Eric Notere		987
William H. Gigini		789
Nathaniel Supa		524
Basil Manelegua		426
Josiah P Riogano		186
Invalid/blank votes		
Total		2,912
Registered voters		4,097
Source: Election Passport

=== 1997 ===
1997 general election
Candidate	Party	Votes
James Saliga		841
William H. Gigini		760
Nathaniel Supa		601
Joseph Tige		229
Invalid/blank votes		
Total		2,431
Registered voters		3,390
Source: Election Passport

=== 1993 ===
1993 general election
Candidate	Party	Votes
Nathaniel Supa		890
Culwick Maneguasa Vahia		449
Philip Manehata		226
Rexford Orodaloa		176
Jason Toni		128
Invalid/blank votes		
Total		1,869
Registered voters		2,543
Source: Election Passport
