= East Makira constituency =

East Makira
- Single-member constituency for the National Parliament of the Solomon Islands
- Region: Makira-Ulawa Province

Current constituency
- Created: 1973
- Created from: Makira
- Current MP: Lillian Maefai
- Party: Independent

East Makira is a single-member constituency of the National Parliament of Solomon Islands. Located on the island of Makira, it was established in 1973 when the Governing Council was expanded from 17 to 24 seats.

== List of MPs ==
Term	MP	Party
1973–1976	Benedict Kinika	
1976–1980	Benedict Kinika	
1980–1984	Benedict Kinika	
1984–1989	David Sitai	
1989–1993	David Sitai	
1993–1997	David Sitai	
1997–2001	David Sitai	
2001–2006	David Sitai	
2006–2010	David Sitai	
2010–2014	Alfred Ghiro	Democratic Party
2014–2019	Alfred Ghiro	Democratic Alliance Party
2019	Charles Maefai	Independent
2019–	Lillian Maefai	Independent

== Election results ==
=== December 2019 ===
2019 by-election
Candidate	Party	Votes
Lillian Maefai		3,371
Alfred Ghiro		1,196
Rose Murray		644
Tiks Tauni		590
Martin Karani		466
Thomas Bea		309
Casper Tai		269
Steven Piringisau		227
Henry Quasiki		181
Invalid/blank votes		16
Total		7,289
Registered voters		8,472
Source: SIEC

=== April 2019 ===
2019 general election
Candidate	Party	Votes
Charles Maefai	Independent	3,740
Alfred Ghiro	Democratic Party	1,458
Benedict Tahi	Independent	460
Emilio Wegu	Independent	427
Martin Michah Karani	United Democratic Party	289
Merry Doris Kita	Democratic Alliance Party	232
Frank Wetara	Solomon Islands Party for Rural Advancement	179
Henry Perongo	Independent	142
Golden Kaea	Independent	141
Fox H Qwaina	People First Party	92
Invalid/blank votes		20
Total		7,180
Registered voters		8,453
Source: SIEC

=== 2014 ===
2014 general election
Candidate	Party	Votes
Alfred Ghiro	Democratic Alliance Party	2,225
Charles Jordan Maefai	United Democratic Party	1,908
Henry Aife Murray	People's Alliance Party	1,722
Stanley S. Siapu	Independent	320
Moses Haganitoto	National Transformation Party	248
Marcel Gapu	Independent	201
Warren Tereqora	Independent	144
Fox Qwaina	Pipol First Party	33
Invalid/blank votes		48
Total		
Registered voters		
Source: Election Passport

=== 2010 ===
2010 general election
Candidate	Party	Votes
Alfred Ghiro	Democratic Party	1,480
Martin Karani		842
Daniel Wagatora		761
John Mamafe	Ownership, Unity and Responsibility Party	747
Nathaniel P. Waka'a		595
Otto M. Kuper		441
Warren Tereqora		372
Nicholas K. Gapiara		344
Stanley S. Siapu	Rural and Urban Political Party	255
Fred P. Fanua		176
Stevenson Piringisau		168
Henry J. K. Sitai		124
Henry S. Kuata		85
Thomas Bea		46
Invalid/blank votes		30
Total		6,466
Registered voters		8,473
Source: Election Passport

=== 2006 ===
2006 general election
Candidate	Party	Votes
David Sitai		1,240
Alfred Ghiro		1,132
Fred P. Fanua		579
Doreen Kuper		567
George Kuata		488
Warren Tereqora		324
Daniel Dannah Nahusu		301
Stanley S. Siapu		200
Francis Tagua		62
Invalid/blank votes		
Total		4,893
Registered voters		6,805
Source: Election Passport

=== 2001 ===
2001 general election
Candidate	Party	Votes
David Sitai		1,454
Fred P. Fanua		794
Martin Karani		722
Philip Taisau		499
Thomas Weape		459
Clement Waiwori		342
Mathias Pepena		338
Stephen Siapu		170
Invalid/blank votes		
Total		4,778
Registered voters		5,978
Source: Election Passport

=== 1997 ===
1997 general election
Candidate	Party	Votes
David Sitai		2,483
Mathias Pepena		625
George Kuata		398
Invalid/blank votes		
Total		3,506
Registered voters		4,369
Source: Election Passport

=== 1993 ===
1993 general election
Candidate	Party	Votes
David Sitai		1,549
Noel Wagapu		611
Augustine Faruara		428
Warren Tereqora		259
Stanley S. Siapu		107
Jude Edward Hagasua		89
Invalid/blank votes		
Total		3,043
Registered voters		4,036
Source: Election Passport

=== 1989 ===
1989 general election
Candidate	Party	Votes
David Sitai		2,214
Benedict Kinika		1,359
Invalid/blank votes		
Total		3,573
Registered voters		4,450
Source: Election Passport

=== 1984 ===
1984 general election
Candidate	Party	Votes
David Sitai		1,868
Benedict Kinika		1,380
Invalid/blank votes		
Total		3,248
Registered voters		
Source: Election Passport

=== 1980 ===
1980 general election
Candidate	Party	Votes
Benedict Kinika		1,001
David Sitai		989
F. Campbell		440
A. Wabwo		107
Invalid/blank votes		
Total		2,537
Registered voters		3,373
Source: Election Passport

=== 1976 ===
1976 general election
Candidate	Party	Votes
Benedict Kinika		779
Geoffrey Kuper		498
Macpherson Mwara		444
Elijah Koke		121
Daniel Kuata		115
Beato Tora		63
Invalid/blank votes		
Total		2,020
Registered voters		
Source: Election Passport

=== 1973 ===
1973 general election
Candidate	Party	Votes
Benedict Kinika		1,034
Geoffrey Kuper		638
Invalid/blank votes		
Total		1,672
Registered voters		
Source: Election Passport
