= Commins Mewa =

Solomon Islands politician (born 1965)

The Right Honourable Commins Aston Mewa MP

Minister for Home Affairs
- Incumbent
- Assumed office 5 December 2017
- Prime Minister: Rick Houenipwela
- Preceded by: Moses Garu

Minister for Communication and Aviation
- In office 15 December 2014 – 5 December 2017
- Prime Minister: Manasseh Sogavare
- Preceded by: Walter Folatalu

Minister for Justice and Legal Affairs
- In office 27 August 2010 – 19 November 2014
- Prime Minister: Danny Philip (until 16 November 2011); then Gordon Darcy Lilo
- Succeeded by: Ishmael Avui

Member of Parliament for Temotu Nende
- Incumbent
- Assumed office 4 August 2010
- Preceded by: Patteson Oti

Personal details
- Born: April 11, 1965 (age 61) Uta, Temotu Province
- Party: Independent
- Education: University of the South Pacific

Commins Aston Mewa (born April 11, 1965 in Uta, Santa Cruz, Temotu Province) is a Solomon Islands politician.

He worked as a chief education officer before going into politics. His career in national politics began when he was elected to Parliament as the member for Temotu Nende in the August 2010 general election, standing as an independent candidate. He was then appointed Minister for Justice and Legal Affairs in Prime Minister Danny Philip's Cabinet. When Gordon Darcy Lilo replaced Philip as Prime Minister in November 2011, Mewa retained his position in government.

On 15 December 2014, following a general election, Mewa was appointed Minister for Communication and Aviation by new Prime Minister Manasseh Sogavare. On 5 December 2017, appointed Minister for Home Affairs by PM Rick Houenipwela.

Elected for the Kadere Party in the 2019 Solomon Islands general election.
