= Maefai =

Maefai is a surname. Notable people with the surname include:

- Charles Maefai (died 2019), Solomon Islands politician
- Lillian Maefai, Solomon Islands politician
