= Alfred Ghiro =

Solomon Islands politician (born 1968)

The Right Honourable Alfred Ghiro MP

Minister for Fisheries and Marine Resources
- Incumbent
- Assumed office 1 March 2012?
- Prime Minister: Gordon Darcy Lilo
- Preceded by: Bradley Tovosia

Minister for Public Service
- In office 23 November 2011 – 1 March 2012?
- Prime Minister: Gordon Darcy Lilo
- Preceded by: Ricky Houeniopwela
- Succeeded by: Bradley Tovosia

Member of Parliament for East Makira
- In office 4 August 2010 – April 2019
- Preceded by: David Sitai
- Succeeded by: Charles Maefai

Personal details
- Born: 13 August 1968 (age 57) Baro, Makira
- Party: Democratic Party

Alfred Ghiro (born August 13, 1968) is a Solomon Islands politician.

He was born in Baro, Makira and began his career in national politics when he was elected MP for East Makira in the August 2010 general election, standing as a candidate for the Democratic Party. The Democrats obtained thirteen seats out of fifty, making them by far the largest party in the National Parliament, but their leader Steve Abana failed to obtain the support of a parliamentary majority after the election, and thus became Leader of the Opposition to Prime Minister Danny Philip's government. Appointing his Shadow Cabinet, Abana made Ghiro Shadow Minister for Provincial Government and Institutional strengthening.

At some point, Ghiro defected to the parliamentary majority, becoming a government backbencher, despite being a member of the main opposition party. He subsequently defected back to the Opposition, accompanying several government ministers, on August 20, 2011. When those ministers rejoined the government the following month, he followed suit on February 21.

When Gordon Darcy Lilo replaced Philip as Prime Minister in November 2011, he appointed Ghiro as Minister for Public Service. On or around 1 March 2012, Lilo reshuffled Ghiro to the position of Minister for Fisheries, whereby he exchanged portfolios with Bradley Tovosia.

Ghiro lost his seat of East Maikra in the 2019 general election to Charles Maefai, an independent.
