= Samuel Manetoali =

Solomon Islands politician (born 1969)

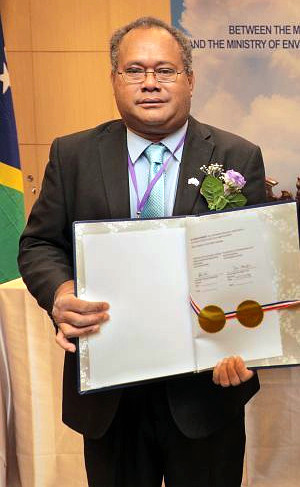
- Minister Samuel Manetoali displays a memorandum of understanding on meteorology and seismology cooperation between Solomon Islands and the Republic of China (Taiwan) on 28 April 2017 in Taipei City.

Member of Parliament for Gao/Bugotu
- Incumbent
- Assumed office 2006
- Monarchs: Elizabeth II; Charles III
- Preceded by: Eric Notere

Personal details
- Born: 24 January 1969 (age 57)
- Party: Kadere Party
- Occupation: Politician, lawyer

Samuel Manetoali (born 24 January 1969) is a member of the National Parliament of Solomon Islands. He represents the Gao/Bugotu constituency in Isabel Province.

== Early life and education ==
Manetoali attended Lepi Primary School and then went on to do his secondary education at King George Sixth National School in Honiara. He attended law school at the University of Papua New Guinea and graduated with an LLB degree and further unspecified qualifications from the University of Tasmania and University of South Australia.

== Career ==
Prior to entering politics, Manetoali worked in the country's Public Solicitors Office, as a private lawyer, and a legal adviser to the Isabel Provincial Government.

He first entered parliament in the 2006 general election and re-elected in the 2010 general election. He served as the Solomon Islands' Minister of Police, National Security and Correctional Services in Prime Minister Derek Sikua's Cabinet until May 2009, when he was transferred to the position of Minister for Lands, Survey, and Housing.

Following the 2010 general election, he remained in Cabinet, under new Prime Minister Danny Philip, as Minister for Tourism and Culture. In the 2014 general election, he ran as an independent candidate and was re-elected for a third term in a landslide.

He was re-elected as a Member of Parliament in the 2019 general election for Gao/Bugotu, representing the Kadere Party.
