= David Sitai =

Solomon Islands politician (born 1948)

David Sitai (born 1948) is a politician in the Solomon Islands.

== Biography ==
Sitai first ran for a seat in the National Parliament when he ran against incumbent MP Benedict Kinika in the East Makira constituency in the 1980 general elections. Although he lost to Kinika, he stood against him again in the 1984 elections, and was elected to Parliament. He was subsequently re-elected in 1989, 1993, 1997, 2001 Solomon Islands general election and 2006. He served as Minister for National Planning and Development from 1994 to 1996 and as Minister for Foreign Affairs from September 1996 to August 1997 and from July 2001 to December 2001. In July 1997, he signed the Basic Border Agreement between Papua New Guinea and the Solomon Islands together with the former's Foreign Minister, Kilroy Genia, at the Parliament building in Honiara.

In the 2010 elections he was defeated by Alfred Ghiro.
