= Lillian Maefai =

Solomon Islands politician

Lillian Maefai was a member of the Parliament of the Solomon Islands. She was only the fifth woman ever to be elected to that parliament.

== Early life ==
Lillian "Lilly" Maefai was born on the island of Malaita, the most populous island in the Solomon Islands. She graduated with secretarial qualifications from the Honiara Solomon Islands College of Higher Education and then worked for more than a decade at the Solomon Star newspaper, where her husband also worked. The couple than left the paper to start a small printing company.

== Political life ==
Maefai's husband, Charles Maefai, was elected to the parliament for the East Makira constituency on Makira island in the elections of April 2019. He died three months later. Lillian Maefai was asked by his constituents to consider running for parliament in the by-election. Initially she was hesitant because she felt that, as a woman from Malaita, she would not be supported in Makira. However, she was eventually persuaded and was easily elected, receiving close to half the votes in a field of nine candidates. Taking her Oath of Allegiance on 18 December 2019, she became the third woman in the 50-member 2019-2023 parliament, joining Freda Soria Comua and Lanelle Tanangada. A fourth woman, Ethel Lency Vokia, was subsequently elected in 2020.

Although elected as an independent candidate, Maefai announced that she had joined the Ownership, Unity and Responsibility Party ("Our" Party), led by the prime minister, Manasseh Sogavare.

Lillian Maefai lost the East Makira Constituency seat in the 2024 National General Elections. She was replaced by Franklyn Wasi who was a consultant at the Food and Agriculture Organization country office in Solomon Island, a career public servant and former lecturer at the Solomon Islands National University.
