= Bartholomew Parapolo =

Solomon Islands politician (born 1963)

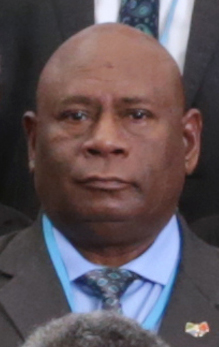
- Bartholomew Parapolo poses for an official photo as part of the delegation led by Solomon Islands Prime Minister Manasseh Sogavare (26 September 2017) in Taipei, Taiwan

Minister of Forestry & Research

Minister of Tourism and Culture

Personal details
- Born: Lago village, Small Ngella, Central Province
- Party: Kadere Party

Bartholomew Parapolo (born 1963) is a politician of Solomon Islands who serves as the Minister of Tourism and Culture. He previously held the position of Minister of Forestry & Research from 18 August, 2015 to 27 October, 2015. In 2016 he was elected as the Paramount Chief of the Nggela Islands.
