= Charles Maefai =

Solomon Islands politician (died 2019)

Member of the National Parliament of the Solomon Islands
- In office 3 April 2019 – July 2019
- Constituency: East Makira

Personal details
- Died: July 2019

Charles Maefai (died 2019) was the member of the Parliament of the Solomon Islands from East Makira. He died three months after being elected in the 2019 general election. His wife Lillian Maefai succeeded him in a parliamentary by-election.
