= Peter Boyers =

Solomon Islands politician (born 1962)

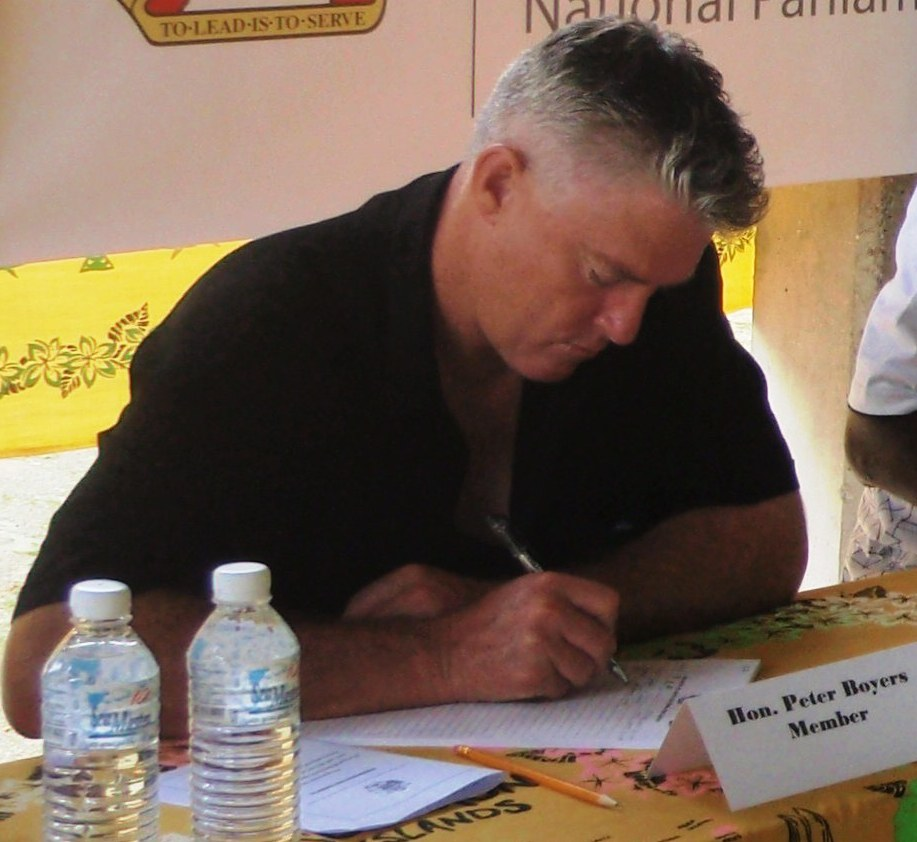
Boyers in 2009

Peter Boyers (born September 30, 1962) is a former member of the National Parliament of the Solomon Islands. He represented the Vona Vona constituency in Western Province. He lost his seat in the 2010 national election. He was Minister of Finance of the Solomon Islands from 2005 to 2006.

He founded the Kadere Party in 2014.
