= 2019 Solomon Islands general election =

- 3 April 2019
- All 50 seats in the National Parliament; 26 seats needed for a majority
- Turnout: 86.42% (▼3.51pp)
Party	Leader	Vote %	Seats	+/–
Democratic Party	Matthew Wale	13.64	8	New
United Party	Peter Kenilorea Jr.	10.43	2	New
Kadere Party	Peter Boyers	9.50	8	+7
United Democratic	Thomas Ko Chan	8.16	4	−1
Democratic Alliance	Rick Houenipwela	6.37	3	−4
People's Alliance	Nathaniel Waena	6.00	2	−1
People First	Jimmie Rodgers	3.69	1	0
SIPRA	Gordon Darcy Lilo	3.18	1	0
Independents	–	36.52	21	−11
This lists parties that won seats. See the complete results below.
Results by constituency
Prime Minister before	Prime Minister after
Rick Houenipwela; Democratic Alliance	Manasseh Sogavare; OUR Party

General elections were held in Solomon Islands on 3 April 2019 to determine the composition of the 11th Parliament. The election was the first to occur since the conclusion of the Regional Assistance Mission to Solomon Islands (RAMSI) in 2017. Parliament passed amendments to the electoral act in 2018 that included the introduction of pre-polling, a significant increase in campaign budgets for candidates and stricter penalties for individuals committing electoral offences such as vote-buying. Ten of the thirteen parties that contested the election won seats, and the Solomon Islands Democratic Party and the Kadere Party were the parties that secured the highest number, winning eight each. However, as in previous elections, independent candidates won the largest share of seats, securing 21.

Two blocs emerged to attempt to form a government, including the Grand Coalition, with Mathew Wale as their candidate for prime minister. In contrast, the other bloc, the Democratic Coalition Government for Advancement, nominated Manasseh Sogavare to challenge Wale. Sogavare had previously served as prime minister three times; his previous stint ended in 2017 after he lost a no-confidence vote. Wale challenged Sogavare's bid in court, claiming he was ineligible to stand for prime minister, as he registered his Ownership, Unity and Responsibility Party (OUR) after the election (Sogavare ran as an independent), in breach of the electoral act. The high court ordered the vote for the prime minister to be postponed on the day it was scheduled to occur on 24 April; however, citing the constitution, Governor-General Frank Kabui ordered the vote to proceed. The Grand Coalition boycotted the vote in protest while parliament elected Sogavare to a fourth non-consecutive premiership. The vote sparked frustration with much of the public and resulted in riots in Honiara. The high court later dismissed Wale's case against Sogavare, determining it to have been based on repealed laws.

== Background ==
Before the previous elections in 2014 Prime Minister Gordon Darcy Lilo implemented biometric voter registration and voter identification cards to prevent individuals from voting multiple times. Two-thirds of the elected candidates were independents, winning 32 seats. Six different parties won the other 18 seats; the Democratic Alliance Party emerged with the most, securing seven seats. Five candidates of the United Democratic Party were successful, while three members of the People's Alliance Party were victorious. Three other parties, the Kadere Party, People First Party and the Solomon Islands Party for Rural Development, each won a single seat. Only one female candidate, Freda Soria Comua, was successful and became only the third woman elected to parliament in the country's history. In an upset, Prime Minister Lilo lost his seat.

Following the elections, negotiations on forming a government commenced. Independent MP Manasseh Sogavare, who previously served two non-consecutive terms as prime minister, formed the Democratic Coalition for Change (DCC), which included the Kadere Party, United Democratic Party and numerous independents. Sogavare established the DCC to form a government, and on 9 December parliament elected him to a third non-consecutive term as prime minister, defeating first-term MP Jeremiah Manele.

In June 2017, the Australian-led Regional Assistance Mission to Solomon Islands concluded operations in the country, the deployment of which was in response to ethnic violence that occurred from 1998 to 2003 and the resulting instability.

In October 2017 nine cabinet ministers, including Deputy Prime Minister Manasseh Maelanga, and several backbenchers defected to the opposition, citing an unease with Sogavare's nephew and chief of staff, Robson Djokovic's alleged undue influence in government affairs. They also claimed that the prime minister ignored them on policy issues and that he had strayed from the coalition's initial goals. On 6 November Sogavare lost a vote of no-confidence filed by the opposition, which was also how his previous stint as prime minister ended. Parliament elected former Finance Minister Rick Houenipwela on 15 November to succeed Sogavare.

== Electoral system ==
The governor-general must schedule a general election to take place within four months of the dissolution of parliament. The nomination period commences the day after the announcement of the election date and concludes 42 days before the poll. The period for campaigning begins on the day of the proclamation of the polling date and ceases the day before the election. The 50 members of the National Parliament were elected in single-member constituencies using first-past-the-post voting. Candidates had to be at least 21 years old and resident in the constituency in which they ran. Disqualifications included holding dual citizenship, being executives or members of the Electoral Commission, having an undischarged bankruptcy, being imprisoned for more than six months, or being under a death sentence. Candidates running as members of a registered political party were not permitted to change their affiliation after the confirmation of their nomination; unless they withdrew and filed their candidacy again. The 2018 electoral act raised the non-refundable nomination fee from SI$2000 to SI$5000 in an attempt to lower the number of candidates, especially "shadow candidates" who ran with the sole purpose of splitting votes to benefit other contestants. The electoral commission argued that with fewer candidates, the victor would gain a more decisive mandate.

=== Voters ===
Voters had to be at least 18 years old and hold Solomon Islands citizenship. Overseas residents could not vote, and people were disqualified from voting if they had committed a breach of the electoral law, been declared insane, been imprisoned for more than six months, or were under a death sentence. A total of 359,523 Solomon Islanders registered to vote in the elections. The 2018 electoral act introduced pre-polling, which was open to polling staff and police officers that were to going to provide security for voting centres on election day.

== Parties and candidates ==
A total of 333 candidates were nominated to contest the election; 171 were affiliates of a party, and 162 were independents. There were only 26 female candidates, a similar number to elections in the previous 20 years. Although the number of female voters has usually been equal to male voters, few women have run in past elections due to biases such as a perception that women's influence should not extend beyond domestic duties. Thirteen parties competed; however, parties in the Solomon Islands have tended to be personality-based, small, with limited organisation, and often lacking a clear ideology. Two candidates registered and campaigned as members of a party; however, disputes arose regarding proof of their affiliation. One candidate, Mark Kemakeza, campaigned as a member of the Solomon Islands Democratic Party (SIDP). However, the SIDP denied Kemakeza was an affiliate of the party and filed a complaint with the electoral commission, resulting in Kemakeza's disqualification in March 2019, decreasing the candidate total to 332.

Party	Leader	Candidates	2014 result		Ref(s).
Party	Leader	Candidates	Vote %	Seats	Ref(s).
United Democratic Party	Thomas Ko Chan	18	10.72%	5 / 50	
Democratic Alliance Party	Rick Houenipwela	23	7.78%	7 / 50	
Kadere Party	Peter Boyers	13	4.67%	1 / 50	
People First Party	Jimmie Rodgers	17	4.51%	1 / 50	
People's Alliance Party	Nathaniel Waena	21	4.44%	3 / 50	
Solomon Islands Party for Rural Advancement	Gordon Darcy Lilo	10	3.90%	1 / 50	
National Transformation Party	Ellison Bako	7	2.85%	0 / 50	
Pan Melanesian Congress Party	Martin Matai	3	2.11%	0 / 50	
New Nation Party	—N/a	2	0.31%	0 / 50	
People's Progressive Party	Charles Dausabea	3	0.24%	0 / 50	
Solomon Islands Democratic Party	Matthew Wale	22	—N/a	—N/a	
Solomon Islands United Party	Peter Kenilorea Jr.	29	—N/a	—N/a	
Green Party Solomon Islands	Ernest Kolly	3	—N/a	—N/a	
Independents	—N/a	162	56.27%	32 / 50	

== Campaign ==
As in other Melanesian countries, "money politics", which refers to candidates engaging in vote buying and political gifting, have historically featured heavily throughout campaign seasons in the Solomon Islands. To combat this practice, amendments in the 2018 electoral act implemented stricter penalties, including a SI$50,000 fine and a 15-year prison sentence. The electoral commission conducted an awareness campaign in the lead-up to the election, highlighting the consequences of engaging in this practice. The 2018 amendments also increased the maximum campaign budget for candidates from SI$50,000 to SI$500,000 and, in turn, featured lavish spending from some contestants. Leadership quality, good governance and the economy were some of the most common issues many candidates focused on.

The Solomon Islands' diplomatic relations with Taiwan were frequently debated during the campaign. Numerous candidates, such as former Prime Minister Gordon Darcy Lilo, advocated for severing ties with Taiwan and establishing diplomatic relations with China due to the growing trade between the Solomon Islands and the latter. Despite having no formal diplomatic links, China had already become the Solomon Islands' largest export market. Incumbent Prime Minister Rick Houenipwela pledged a review of ties with Taipei if his government remained in power, although he clarified it did not mean a switch was inevitable. In late March, the Island Sun reported that an unidentified party negotiated secretly with Chinese officials, promising to establish relations with Beijing in exchange for money.

The campaign season concluded on 2 April, when the country's first campaign blackout period began, which from that day to the end of the election, barred campaigning and the public display of campaign material. The blackout was implemented by amendments in 2018; in previous polls, the night before polling day was known as the "devil's night" which would reportedly see an uptick in numerous candidates engaging in bribery and treating to secure last-minute votes.

== Conduct ==
The dissolution of the 10th Parliament occurred on 16 December 2018, and Governor-General Frank Kabui announced the election date on 5 February 2019. Pre-polling occurred on 21 March from 7:00 to 17:00 (UTC+11). Shortly before the election, the Electoral Commission launched two apps that assist voters in finding their polling stations and where they could search for their identification number.

Australian and New Zealand defence forces provided contingency logistics support before and during the elections, including approximately 300 personnel, HMAS Melville, and six support helicopters. Observers included New Zealand observer groups in three constituencies, Australian observer groups in fourteen constituencies, and Australian National University researchers and observers in fifteen constituencies.

Days before the election, allegations surfaced of candidates threatening voters if they did not vote for them, which Police Commissioner Matthew Varley condemned. On election day, polling stations were open from 7:00 to 17:00 (UTC+11), although voters who were waiting in line before closing time but had not yet cast their ballots were allowed to vote. An alcohol ban was in force on election day and during the counting period, and over a thousand police officers were deployed around the country. Some polling stations were reportedly too small, leading to overcrowding and a lack of privacy for voters. While the election was mostly orderly and peaceful, observer delegations noted the presence of irregularities, with some voters' names missing from electoral lists at polling centres. Unlike past elections, once voting concluded, ballot boxes were transported to the capital Honiara where the vote counting occurred. Fears of violence led the police force to be on alert as the results were being announced and also prompted the police commissioner to prohibit victory parades.

== Results ==
Eight parties won seats, none of which secured a majority. The Solomon Islands Democratic Party and the Kedare Party emerged as the largest parties, with eight seats each, and 21 independents were victorious. As in the 2014 election, most incumbents won re-election; of the 48 who contested, 13 lost their seats, including former Prime Ministers Derek Sikua and Snyder Rini. Two women, both incumbents, were elected. One of whom, Lanelle Tanangada, who won her seat in a 2018 by-election, narrowly defeated former Prime Minister Gordon Darcy Lilo for a second time. Turnout exceeded 80% in most constituencies.

Party	Votes	%	Seats	+/–
Solomon Islands Democratic Party	42,245	13.64	8	New
Solomon Islands United Party	32,302	10.43	2	New
Kadere Party	29,421	9.50	8	+7
United Democratic Party	25,293	8.16	4	–1
Democratic Alliance Party	19,720	6.37	3	–4
People's Alliance Party	18,573	6.00	2	–1
People First Party	11,419	3.69	1	0
Solomon Islands Party for Rural Advancement	9,863	3.18	1	0
National Transformation Party	4,622	1.49	0	0
Pan Melanesian Congress Party	1,506	0.49	0	0
Green Party Solomon Islands	619	0.20	0	New
New Nation Party	591	0.19	0	0
People's Progressive Party	481	0.16	0	0
Independents	113,142	36.52	21	–11
Total	309,797	100.00	50	0
Valid votes	309,797	99.71		
Invalid/blank votes	902	0.29		
Total votes	310,699	100.00		
Registered voters/turnout	359,523	86.42		
Source: SIEC, Solomon Islands Election Resources

=== By constituency ===
Results by constituency
Constituency	Electorate	Candidate	Party	Votes	%	Notes
Aoke/Langalanga	8,841	Mathew Cooper Wale	Solomon Islands Democratic Party	3,712	46.85	Re-elected
Aoke/Langalanga	8,841	Vincent Talauburi Anisi	Kadere Party	2,770	34.96	
Aoke/Langalanga	8,841	David Faradatolo	Independent	1,431	18.06	
Aoke/Langalanga	8,841	Rejected votes		10	0.13	
Baegu/Asifola	10,943	Tagini Makario	United Democratic Party	3,028	31.58	Elected
Baegu/Asifola	10,943	David Tome	People's Alliance Party	2,572	26.83	Unseated
Baegu/Asifola	10,943	Robert Iroga	Solomon Islands United Party	1,785	18.62	
Baegu/Asifola	10,943	Gabriel Kwanae Suri	Solomon Islands Democratic Party	1,685	17.58	
Baegu/Asifola	10,943	George Taloga Suri	Independent	470	4.90	
Baegu/Asifola	10,943	Elijah Asilaua	Independent	9	0.09	
Baegu/Asifola	10,943	Rejected votes		38	0.40	
Central Guadalcanal	8,150	Peter Shanel Agovaka	Independent	3,584	47.48	Re-elected
Central Guadalcanal	8,150	Walton Naezon	Solomon Islands United Party	2,978	39.45	
Central Guadalcanal	8,150	Peter Isaac Qotso	Independent	911	12.07	
Central Guadalcanal	8,150	Silas Anesaia	Independent	22	0.29	
Central Guadalcanal	8,150	Jacobeth Vari Maneiria	Democratic Alliance Party	20	0.26	
Central Guadalcanal	8,150	Rejected votes		34	0.45	
Central Honiara	15,986	John Moffat Fugui	United Democratic Party	4,028	33.66	Re-elected
Central Honiara	15,986	Alfred Efona	Independent	2,940	24.57	
Central Honiara	15,986	Frank Aotee	People First Party	2,349	19.63	
Central Honiara	15,986	Joseph Douglas	Independent	814	6.80	
Central Honiara	15,986	Hendry Ologa Oloben	Independent	750	6.27	
Central Honiara	15,986	Julie Gegeu Haro	Solomon Islands United Party	300	2.51	
Central Honiara	15,986	Moon Pin Quan	Independent	203	1.70	
Central Honiara	15,986	Eric Moses Tema	Independent	147	1.23	
Central Honiara	15,986	Billy Mae	Independent	126	1.05	
Central Honiara	15,986	Sam Lidimani Alasia	People's Alliance Party	92	0.77	
Central Honiara	15,986	Edward Ronia	New Nation Party	65	0.54	
Central Honiara	15,986	Johnny Maetia	Independent	51	0.43	
Central Honiara	15,986	Gary Faaitoa	Independent	27	0.23	
Central Honiara	15,986	Rose Annie Anilabata	Independent	26	0.22	
Central Honiara	15,986	Cathrine Adifaka	Independent	11	0.09	
Central Honiara	15,986	Percy Elima	National Transformation Party	9	0.08	
Central Honiara	15,986	Rejected votes		28	0.23	
Central Kwara'Ae	8,458	Jackson Fiulaua	Independent	3,200	42.45	Re-elected
Central Kwara'Ae	8,458	Ben Bau	Solomon Islands Democratic Party	2,760	36.61	
Central Kwara'Ae	8,458	David Diosi	Solomon Islands United Party	1,134	15.04	
Central Kwara'Ae	8,458	Alick Hagi	People's Progressive Party	135	1.79	
Central Kwara'Ae	8,458	Alick Maeaba	Democratic Alliance Party	133	1.76	
Central Kwara'Ae	8,458	Silas Auramo	Independent	97	1.29	
Central Kwara'Ae	8,458	Clera Gore Rikimani	People First Party	50	0.66	
Central Kwara'Ae	8,458	Johnson Senior Lucas	Independent	8	0.11	
Central Kwara'Ae	8,458	Rejected votes		21	0.28	
Central Makira	6,299	Nestor Ghiro	Independent	3,803	70.20	Re-elected
Central Makira	6,299	Peter Thompson Usumae	United Democratic Party	1,419	26.20	
Central Makira	6,299	Hypolite Taremae	Independent	152	2.81	
Central Makira	6,299	Casper Muna	Democratic Alliance Party	29	0.54	
Central Makira	6,299	Rejected votes		14	0.26	
East ꞌAreꞌare	7,582	Peter Kenilorea Junior	Solomon Islands United Party	4,200	60.15	Elected
East ꞌAreꞌare	7,582	Andrew Manepora'a	Kadere Party	2,754	39.44	Unseated
East ꞌAreꞌare	7,582	Michael Tokii	Independent	18	0.26	
East ꞌAreꞌare	7,582	Rejected votes		11	0.16	
East Central Guadalcanal	6,953	Ishmael Mali Avui	Kadere Party	3,187	50.23	Re-elected
East Central Guadalcanal	6,953	Lazarus Alfred Rimah	Independent	2,603	41.02	
East Central Guadalcanal	6,953	Reuben Tovutovu	People's Alliance Party	501	7.90	
East Central Guadalcanal	6,953	James Manebosa	Independent	43	0.68	
East Central Guadalcanal	6,953	Rejected votes		11	0.17	
East Choiseul	3,802	Mannaseh Sogavare	Independent	1,860	59.27	Re-elected
East Choiseul	3,802	Ezra Kukuti	Solomon Islands United Party	755	24.06	
East Choiseul	3,802	James Ron Kaboke	People First Party	485	15.46	
East Choiseul	3,802	Loloma Pabulu	Independent	19	0.61	
East Choiseul	3,802	Danson Tanito	Solomon Islands Democratic Party	15	0.48	
East Choiseul	3,802	Rejected votes		4	0.13	
East Guadalcanal	6,640	Bradley Tovosia	Independent	3,985	67.86	Re-elected
East Guadalcanal	6,640	Timothy Manepuria	Solomon Islands Democratic Party	1,484	25.27	
East Guadalcanal	6,640	Benedict Tova	United Democratic Party	112	1.91	
East Guadalcanal	6,640	Patrick Junior Savusi	Independent	98	1.67	
East Guadalcanal	6,640	Selestino Solosaia	Solomon Islands United Party	87	1.48	
East Guadalcanal	6,640	Tobias Verabola	Independent	78	1.33	
East Guadalcanal	6,640	Rejected votes		28	0.48	
East Honiara	15,445	Douglas Ete	Solomon Islands Democratic Party	5,710	47.91	Re-elected
East Honiara	15,445	Ellison Bako	National Transformation Party	2,552	21.41	
East Honiara	15,445	John Kabolo	Pan Melanesian Congress Party	1,447	12.14	
East Honiara	15,445	Andrew Hanaria Keniasina	Solomon Islands United Party	694	5.82	
East Honiara	15,445	Redley Raramo	Democratic Alliance Party	674	5.66	
East Honiara	15,445	Joyce Konofilia	People First Party	443	3.72	
East Honiara	15,445	Micheal Maeliau	Independent	165	1.38	
East Honiara	15,445	Walter Folotalu	Solomon Islands Party for Rural Advancement	133	1.12	
East Honiara	15,445	Casper Joseph Fa'Asala	People's Alliance Party	72	0.60	
East Honiara	15,445	Robert Maemae	Independent	2	0.02	
East Honiara	15,445	Rejected votes		25	0.21	
East Kwaio	7,536	Stanley Festus Sofu	Independent	3,949	61.27	Re-elected
East Kwaio	7,536	Alfred Solomon Sasako	United Democratic Party	1,532	23.77	
East Kwaio	7,536	Philip Junior Ika	Solomon Islands United Party	494	7.66	
East Kwaio	7,536	Francis Sisimia	Democratic Alliance Party	223	3.46	
East Kwaio	7,536	Diki Joses Kolosu	Independent	128	1.99	
East Kwaio	7,536	Rejected votes		119	1.85	
East Makira	8,453	Charles Jordan Maefai	Independent	3,740	51.02	Elected
East Makira	8,453	Alfred Ghiro	Solomon Islands Democratic Party	1,458	19.89	Unseated
East Makira	8,453	Benedict Tahi	Independent	460	6.28	
East Makira	8,453	Emilio Wegu	Independent	427	5.83	
East Makira	8,453	Frank Wetara	Solomon Islands Party for Rural Advancement	329	4.49	
East Makira	8,453	Martin Micah Karani	United Democratic Party	289	3.94	
East Makira	8,453	Merry Doris Kita	Democratic Alliance Party	232	3.17	
East Makira	8,453	Henry Perongo	Independent	142	1.94	
East Makira	8,453	Golden Kaea	Independent	141	1.92	
East Makira	8,453	Fox H Qwaina	People First Party	92	1.26	
East Makira	8,453	Rejected votes		20	0.27	
East Malaita	6,121	Manasseh Maelanga	People's Alliance Party	2,966	56.26	Re-elected
East Malaita	6,121	William Baefua	Solomon Islands United Party	1,247	23.65	
East Malaita	6,121	Roy Jahdiel Funu	New Nation Party	526	9.98	
East Malaita	6,121	Evan Gerea	Democratic Alliance Party	258	4.89	
East Malaita	6,121	Finley Fiumae	Independent	220	4.17	
East Malaita	6,121	Rejected votes		55	1.04	
Fataleka	7,139	Rexon Annex Ramofafia	Solomon Islands United Party	2,628	41.08	Elected
Fataleka	7,139	Steve William Abana	Democratic Alliance Party	1,777	27.77	Unseated
Fataleka	7,139	Moffat Ramofafia	People First Party	938	14.66	
Fataleka	7,139	Luke Mani	Independent	395	6.17	
Fataleka	7,139	Allen Joses Bae	Solomon Islands Democratic Party	326	5.10	
Fataleka	7,139	Elison Lade	National Transformation Party	190	2.97	
Fataleka	7,139	Felix Laumae Kabini	Independent	118	1.84	
Fataleka	7,139	Ross Siosi	Independent	13	0.20	
Fataleka	7,139	Rejected votes		13	0.20	
Gao/Bugotu	5,543	Samuel Manetoali	Kadere Party	2,467	50.93	Re-elected
Gao/Bugotu	5,543	Adrian Toni	Democratic Alliance Party	1,102	22.75	
Gao/Bugotu	5,543	Daniel Tanochoki Sio	Independent	464	9.58	
Gao/Bugotu	5,543	Wilson Karamui Bugotu	Independent	308	6.36	
Gao/Bugotu	5,543	Allan Kaihe Kilovunagi Tavake	Solomon Islands United Party	208	4.29	
Gao/Bugotu	5,543	Ernest Kolly	Green Party Solomon Islands	168	3.47	
Gao/Bugotu	5,543	Dereck Kolinahiga Kodo	Independent	121	2.50	
Gao/Bugotu	5,543	Rejected votes		6	0.12	
Gizo/Kolombangara	10,527	Lanelle Olandrea Tanangada	Kadere Party	4,397	51.54	Re-elected
Gizo/Kolombangara	10,527	Gordon Darcy Lilo	Solomon Islands Party for Rural Advancement	4,002	46.91	
Gizo/Kolombangara	10,527	John Hopa	Independent	103	1.21	
Gizo/Kolombangara	10,527	Rejected votes		30	0.35	
Hograno/Kia/Havulei	6,910	Jeremiah Manele	Democratic Alliance Party	4,568	73.46	Re-elected
Hograno/Kia/Havulei	6,910	Selwyn Riumana	United Democratic Party	1,565	25.17	
Hograno/Kia/Havulei	6,910	Nelson Kile	People's Alliance Party	78	1.25	
Hograno/Kia/Havulei	6,910	Rejected votes		7	0.11	
Lau/Mbaelelea	10,955	Maeue Augustine Auga	Independent	4,728	49.10	Re-elected
Lau/Mbaelelea	10,955	Harry Philip	United Democratic Party	2,467	25.62	
Lau/Mbaelelea	10,955	Lawinter Kaleasi Ki'I	Solomon Islands United Party	681	7.07	
Lau/Mbaelelea	10,955	Frank Konairara Tabai	People First Party	628	6.52	
Lau/Mbaelelea	10,955	Tony Makabo	People's Alliance Party	625	6.49	
Lau/Mbaelelea	10,955	Erick George	Independent	425	4.41	
Lau/Mbaelelea	10,955	Judson Lee Leafasia	Independent	50	0.52	
Lau/Mbaelelea	10,955	Stephenson Otainao	Independent	4	0.04	
Lau/Mbaelelea	10,955	Rejected votes		22	0.23	
Malaita Outer Islands	3,142	Martin Kealoe	Solomon Islands Democratic Party	1,219	43.90	Re-elected
Malaita Outer Islands	3,142	Leslie Tarzan Holosivi	Independent	737	26.54	
Malaita Outer Islands	3,142	Clay Hugo Kahano	Independent	537	19.34	
Malaita Outer Islands	3,142	Edward Kolohai	Independent	161	5.80	
Malaita Outer Islands	3,142	Wendy Vahoe Amangongo	Independent	106	3.82	
Malaita Outer Islands	3,142	Steward Polycarp Noholia	People's Alliance Party	7	0.25	
Malaita Outer Islands	3,142	Benjamin Kemaili	Independent	2	0.07	
Malaita Outer Islands	3,142	Rejected votes		8	0.29	
Maringe/Kokota	5,893	Culwick Togamana	Democratic Alliance Party	2,462	46.06	Re-elected
Maringe/Kokota	5,893	Cathy Launa Nori	Independent	1,756	32.85	
Maringe/Kokota	5,893	John Perakana Palmer	Independent	771	14.42	
Maringe/Kokota	5,893	Varian Lonamei	Independent	281	5.26	
Maringe/Kokota	5,893	Dickson Goramana	Independent	39	0.73	
Maringe/Kokota	5,893	Redle'e Ausopa	Green Party Solomon Islands	33	0.62	
Maringe/Kokota	5,893	Rejected votes		3	0.06	
Marovo	10,555	Chachabule Rebi Amoi	People First Party	5,619	59.23	Elected
Marovo	10,555	Snyder Rini	United Democratic Party	3,766	39.70	Unseated
Marovo	10,555	Atabani Tahu	Independent	84	0.89	
Marovo	10,555	Rejected votes		18	0.19	
Nggela	10,322	Bartholomew Parapolo	Kadere Party	2,511	26.03	Re-elected
Nggela	10,322	Choylin Yim Douglas	Independent	2,122	22.00	
Nggela	10,322	John Selwyn Vasuni	Independent	1,603	16.62	
Nggela	10,322	John Kouni	People's Alliance Party	1,493	15.48	
Nggela	10,322	Kenneth Sagupari	Solomon Islands United Party	1,005	10.42	
Nggela	10,322	Joseph Hagi	Independent	323	3.35	
Nggela	10,322	Charles Fox Meke	Independent	309	3.20	
Nggela	10,322	Stephen Watson	Independent	235	2.44	
Nggela	10,322	Fredrick Noel Douglas	Independent	29	0.30	
Nggela	10,322	Rejected votes		15	0.16	
North East Guadalcanal	5,168	Jamie Lency Vokia	Independent	1,835	38.54	Elected
North East Guadalcanal	5,168	Derek Sikua	Solomon Islands Democratic Party	1,629	34.22	Unseated
North East Guadalcanal	5,168	Desmond Nimepo Norua	Independent	973	20.44	
North East Guadalcanal	5,168	Henry Tobani	Independent	295	6.20	
North East Guadalcanal	5,168	Alfred Manengelea Lovanitila	Independent	29	0.61	
North Guadalcanal	6,150	Samson Maneka	Solomon Islands Democratic Party	2,320	41.24	Re-elected
North Guadalcanal	6,150	Martin Sopage	Solomon Islands Party for Rural Advancement	1,080	19.20	
North Guadalcanal	6,150	John Kerea	Independent	903	16.05	
North Guadalcanal	6,150	Benedict Parataboa Garimane	Solomon Islands United Party	453	8.05	
North Guadalcanal	6,150	Stephen Panga	Independent	355	6.31	
North Guadalcanal	6,150	Wilson Tathadaena	National Transformation Party	271	4.82	
North Guadalcanal	6,150	Everlyn Thugea Tautai	Democratic Alliance Party	82	1.46	
North Guadalcanal	6,150	Barbi Mane Ghavea	Independent	81	1.44	
North Guadalcanal	6,150	Gwen Ratu	Pan Melanesian Congress Party	41	0.73	
North Guadalcanal	6,150	Daniel Sade Tarai	Independent	26	0.46	
North Guadalcanal	6,150	Rejected votes		14	0.25	
North Malaita	8,052	Levi Senley Filualea	Independent	2,698	38.84	Elected
North Malaita	8,052	Jimmy Lusibaea	People's Alliance Party	2,475	35.63	Unseated
North Malaita	8,052	Glen Waneta Alifeo	Independent	1,564	22.52	
North Malaita	8,052	Agnes Gaote'E	Independent	98	1.41	
North Malaita	8,052	Tommy Tagili	Independent	81	1.17	
North Malaita	8,052	George Senisi	Independent	12	0.17	
North Malaita	8,052	Fredrick Kwanairara	Solomon Islands United Party	7	0.10	
North Malaita	8,052	Rejected votes		11	0.16	
North New Georgia	3,975	John Deane Kuku	Independent	2,267	63.91	Re-elected
North New Georgia	3,975	Dewin Alick	Solomon Islands United Party	1,213	34.20	
North New Georgia	3,975	Kenneth George Nginabule	Independent	59	1.66	
North New Georgia	3,975	Rejected votes		8	0.23	
North Vella Lavella	4,606	Clezy Rore	United Democratic Party	2,232	54.64	Elected
North Vella Lavella	4,606	Milner Tozaka	People's Alliance Party	1,836	44.94	Unseated
North Vella Lavella	4,606	Alex Gina Kivolyn	People First Party	7	0.17	
North Vella Lavella	4,606	Rejected votes		10	0.24	
North West Choiseul	6,816	Harry Kuma	Independent	2,948	51.29	Elected
North West Choiseul	6,816	Connelly Sadakabatu	Democratic Alliance Party	2,514	43.74	Unseated
North West Choiseul	6,816	Hensol Siribau Kiko	Independent	198	3.44	
North West Choiseul	6,816	Eunice Palata	Solomon Islands Democratic Party	81	1.41	
North West Choiseul	6,816	Rejected votes		7	0.12	
North West Guadalcanal	6,565	Horst Heinz Bodo Dettke	Solomon Islands Democratic Party	3,021	52.09	Re-elected
North West Guadalcanal	6,565	Albert Fono	Solomon Islands United Party	2,288	39.45	
North West Guadalcanal	6,565	Allan Kemakeza	Independent	430	7.41	
North West Guadalcanal	6,565	Sophia Munamua Chonic	Pan Melanesian Congress Party	18	0.31	
North West Guadalcanal	6,565	Rejected votes		43	0.74	
Ranongga/Simbo	5,557	Charles Sigoto	Solomon Islands Democratic Party	2,592	57.37	Re-elected
Ranongga/Simbo	5,557	Justin Mutukera	Solomon Islands United Party	1,851	40.97	
Ranongga/Simbo	5,557	Jimmy Stanley	People First Party	68	1.51	
Ranongga/Simbo	5,557	Rejected votes		7	0.15	
Rennell/Bellona	3,563	Tautai Agikimua Kaitu'u	Independent	837	27.67	Re-elected
Rennell/Bellona	3,563	Seth Tegea Gukuna	Democratic Alliance Party	578	19.11	
Rennell/Bellona	3,563	Anthony Tahua Tamaika	Independent	502	16.60	
Rennell/Bellona	3,563	Tesua Muakitangata	People's Alliance Party	471	15.57	
Rennell/Bellona	3,563	Collin Singamoana Tesu'Atai	Independent	363	12.00	
Rennell/Bellona	3,563	Adrian Tuhanuku	Independent	271	8.96	
Rennell/Bellona	3,563	Rejected votes		3	0.10	
Russells/Savo	7,098	Dickson Mua Panakitasi	Independent	2,027	31.96	Re-elected
Russells/Savo	7,098	Oliver Salopuka	Kadere Party	1,924	30.34	
Russells/Savo	7,098	John Hugo Baulo	Independent	1,034	16.30	
Russells/Savo	7,098	Tome Faemane Tarasisio	Independent	718	11.32	
Russells/Savo	7,098	John Talunago	National Transformation Party	313	4.94	
Russells/Savo	7,098	John Peter Tinoni	Independent	94	1.48	
Russells/Savo	7,098	Derick Pepere	Solomon Islands Party for Rural Advancement	90	1.42	
Russells/Savo	7,098	Michael Kemadika	United Democratic Party	84	1.32	
Russells/Savo	7,098	Francis Otainao Iro	Independent	18	0.28	
Russells/Savo	7,098	Buddy Wickhams No'Amasahu	Democratic Alliance Party	11	0.17	
Russells/Savo	7,098	Cypriano Nuake	People First Party	7	0.11	
Russells/Savo	7,098	Jay Timi Rhobinson	Independent	2	0.03	
Russells/Savo	7,098	Rejected votes		20	0.32	
Shortland	3,293	Christopher Laore	People's Alliance Party	1,978	67.62	Re-elected
Shortland	3,293	Caroline Laore Gorae	Democratic Alliance Party	938	32.07	
Shortland	3,293	Steve Jerrad Laore	Independent	6	0.21	
Shortland	3,293	Saeda Iraviri	Independent	0	0.00	
Shortland	3,293	Rejected votes		3	0.10	
Small Malaita	8,053	Rick Houenipwela	Democratic Alliance Party	2,302	33.55	Re-elected
Small Malaita	8,053	William Haomae	Solomon Islands United Party	1,762	25.68	
Small Malaita	8,053	Chris Wate	United Democratic Party	1,600	23.32	
Small Malaita	8,053	John Patteson Ngalihesi	People's Alliance Party	725	10.57	
Small Malaita	8,053	Edwin Aldrin Awaoli	People First Party	381	5.55	
Small Malaita	8,053	Abednigo Maeohu	Independent	72	1.05	
Small Malaita	8,053	Rejected votes		20	0.29	
South Choiseul	6,575	Robertson Erere Galokale	Independent	999	19.06	Elected
South Choiseul	6,575	Tozen Leokana	Solomon Islands United Party	965	18.41	
South Choiseul	6,575	Jackson Kiloe	Independent	742	14.16	
South Choiseul	6,575	Bavare Philip Pitakoe	Independent	725	13.83	
South Choiseul	6,575	Baoro Laxton Koraua	Democratic Alliance Party	704	13.43	
South Choiseul	6,575	Elizah Doro Muala	Independent	471	8.99	Unseated
South Choiseul	6,575	Nanette Anne Tutua	Independent	226	4.31	
South Choiseul	6,575	Christopher Tauro Rabaua	Independent	170	3.24	
South Choiseul	6,575	David Deva	Independent	131	2.50	
South Choiseul	6,575	Bouriki Taniana	Independent	57	1.09	
South Choiseul	6,575	Johnson Pita Sokeni	Independent	42	0.80	
South Choiseul	6,575	Jerry Pakivai	People's Progressive Party	5	0.10	
South Choiseul	6,575	Rejected votes		4	0.08	
South Guadalcanal	7,129	Rollen Seleso	Solomon Islands Party for Rural Advancement	3,104	47.79	Elected
South Guadalcanal	7,129	David Day Pacha	Solomon Islands Democratic Party	2,574	39.63	Unseated
South Guadalcanal	7,129	Heinz Konga	Independent	757	11.66	
South Guadalcanal	7,129	Francis Peter Para	United Democratic Party	37	0.57	
South Guadalcanal	7,129	Victor Alikivara	Independent	1	0.02	
South Guadalcanal	7,129	Rejected votes		22	0.34	
South New Georgia/Rendova/Tetepari	4,274	Danny Philip	United Democratic Party	1,577	43.88	Re-elected
South New Georgia/Rendova/Tetepari	4,274	Jonathan Zama Aqarao	Independent	750	20.87	
South New Georgia/Rendova/Tetepari	4,274	George Solingi Lilo	Independent	742	20.65	
South New Georgia/Rendova/Tetepari	4,274	Stephen Roni	Independent	517	14.39	
South New Georgia/Rendova/Tetepari	4,274	Rejected votes		8	0.22	
South Vella Lavella	5,985	Frederick Kologeto	Independent	2,932	55.30	Elected
South Vella Lavella	5,985	Lional Alex	Solomon Islands Democratic Party	2,351	44.34	Unseated
South Vella Lavella	5,985	Rejected votes		19	0.36	
Temotu Nende	6,239	Commins Aston Mewa	Kadere Party	1,579	31.35	Re-elected
Temotu Nende	6,239	Walter Kola	Solomon Islands United Party	847	16.82	
Temotu Nende	6,239	Andrew Issac Nalua	United Democratic Party	460	9.13	
Temotu Nende	6,239	Nelson Omar Menale	People's Alliance Party	446	8.86	
Temotu Nende	6,239	Simon Peter Melau	National Transformation Party	430	8.54	
Temotu Nende	6,239	Ruddy Schlieffen Oti	Green Party Solomon Islands	418	8.30	
Temotu Nende	6,239	Gabriel Metanen Teao	Independent	336	6.67	
Temotu Nende	6,239	Mabel Numo	Independent	253	5.02	
Temotu Nende	6,239	Maxwell Banyo	Independent	247	4.90	
Temotu Nende	6,239	Rejected votes		20	0.40	
Temotu Pele	5,061	Duddley Kopu	Independent	1,710	43.72	Re-elected
Temotu Pele	5,061	James Bonunga	Solomon Islands Democratic Party	1,490	38.10	
Temotu Pele	5,061	Drummond Tupe Vaea	Solomon Islands Party for Rural Advancement	239	6.11	
Temotu Pele	5,061	David Palapu	Independent	232	5.93	
Temotu Pele	5,061	Douglas Yee	Democratic Alliance Party	114	2.91	
Temotu Pele	5,061	Alfred Apela Toaki	People's Alliance Party	35	0.89	
Temotu Pele	5,061	Michael Maina	Independent	28	0.72	
Temotu Pele	5,061	William Christopher Tolei	Independent	25	0.64	
Temotu Pele	5,061	Luke Laeki	Independent	19	0.49	
Temotu Pele	5,061	Nelly Mabulou Nori	People First Party	10	0.26	
Temotu Pele	5,061	Patrick Teikamatta	Independent	1	0.03	
Temotu Pele	5,061	Rejected votes		8	0.20	
Temotu Vatud	3,565	Freda Ab Tuki Soria Comua	Kadere Party	1,344	47.09	Elected
Temotu Vatud	3,565	Andrew Mua	Independent	770	26.98	
Temotu Vatud	3,565	Chris Ashley Patty	Independent	339	11.88	
Temotu Vatud	3,565	Ezekiel Prians Tamoa	Independent	105	3.68	
Temotu Vatud	3,565	Clay Forau Soalaoi	Solomon Islands Party for Rural Advancement	76	2.66	
Temotu Vatud	3,565	Mary Alalo	Democratic Alliance Party	59	2.07	
Temotu Vatud	3,565	Giles Brunox Forau	Independent	47	1.65	
Temotu Vatud	3,565	Timon Sinava	People's Alliance Party	44	1.54	
Temotu Vatud	3,565	Noel Aisa	Independent	43	1.51	
Temotu Vatud	3,565	Sam Affirua Tarivasa	Independent	13	0.46	
Temotu Vatud	3,565	Mike Tiriti	Solomon Islands United Party	8	0.28	
Temotu Vatud	3,565	Thomas Tofakifenua Nukuafi	United Democratic Party	1	0.04	
Temotu Vatud	3,565	Rejected votes		5	0.18	
Ulawa/Ugi	4,033	Willie Braford Marau	Kadere Party	1,778	52.19	Re-elected
Ulawa/Ugi	4,033	George Takeli	Independent	476	13.97	
Ulawa/Ugi	4,033	Billy Titiulu	Solomon Islands Party for Rural Advancement	448	13.15	
Ulawa/Ugi	4,033	Frederick Isom Rohorua	Independent	277	8.13	
Ulawa/Ugi	4,033	James Takingarasimatawa Tora	Democratic Alliance Party	212	6.22	
Ulawa/Ugi	4,033	Polycarp Haununu	People's Alliance Party	118	3.46	
Ulawa/Ugi	4,033	Robert Henry Rata	Independent	79	2.32	
Ulawa/Ugi	4,033	Stanley Maetaoha	Solomon Islands United Party	16	0.47	
Ulawa/Ugi	4,033	Rejected votes		3	0.09	
West ꞌAreꞌare	6,304	John Maneniaru	Kadere Party	3,223	55.77	Re-elected
West ꞌAreꞌare	6,304	Peter Chanel Ramohia	Solomon Islands United Party	2,518	43.57	
West ꞌAreꞌare	6,304	Slade Waiwaki Ehakeni	Independent	29	0.50	
West ꞌAreꞌare	6,304	Rejected votes		9	0.16	
West Guadalcanal	7,359	Anthony Kamu Veke	Independent	4,407	62.50	Elected
West Guadalcanal	7,359	Moses Garu	Solomon Islands Democratic Party	2,564	36.36	Unseated
West Guadalcanal	7,359	Selina Berah	People First Party	46	0.65	
West Guadalcanal	7,359	Rejected votes		34	0.48	
West Honiara	10,477	Namson Tran	Independent	5,683	66.10	Re-elected
West Honiara	10,477	James Apaniai	National Transformation Party	857	9.97	
West Honiara	10,477	Selwyn Akao	Independent	680	7.91	
West Honiara	10,477	John Kwaita	Solomon Islands United Party	661	7.69	
West Honiara	10,477	Ellen Inahia Maruarofa	Solomon Islands Democratic Party	621	7.22	
West Honiara	10,477	Peter Forau	People First Party	64	0.74	
West Honiara	10,477	Rejected votes		32	0.37	
West Kwaio	6,234	Titus Fika	Independent	1,697	30.50	Elected
West Kwaio	6,234	John Daufanamae	Independent	838	15.06	
West Kwaio	6,234	Jackson Gege	United Democratic Party	699	12.56	
West Kwaio	6,234	Graham Tom Ete'Omea	Independent	632	11.36	
West Kwaio	6,234	Michael Maesugea	Democratic Alliance Party	613	11.02	
West Kwaio	6,234	Rinaldo Aleadalo	Independent	295	5.30	
West Kwaio	6,234	Joseph Primo Baetolingia	Independent	277	4.98	
West Kwaio	6,234	Alfred Afeau	Independent	170	3.06	
West Kwaio	6,234	John Daubo Tafiiru	Solomon Islands United Party	91	1.64	
West Kwaio	6,234	John Girifi'Ona	Independent	81	1.46	
West Kwaio	6,234	Fred Nguiburi Saega	Independent	80	1.44	
West Kwaio	6,234	Robert Houramo	Independent	36	0.65	
West Kwaio	6,234	Patricia Mae Dallu	People First Party	14	0.25	
West Kwaio	6,234	Bobby Kelly	Independent	14	0.25	
West Kwaio	6,234	Willy Tharetoona	Independent	7	0.13	
West Kwaio	6,234	Harry Sinau Tobi	Independent	2	0.04	
West Kwaio	6,234	Rejected votes		18	0.32	
West Kwara'Ae	9,674	Sam Shemuel Iduri	Solomon Islands Democratic Party	1,996	22.98	Re-elected
West Kwara'Ae	9,674	Alfred J. M. Tuasulia	Independent	1,608	18.52	
West Kwara'Ae	9,674	Clement Koba'a Oikali	Kadere Party	1,440	16.58	
West Kwara'Ae	9,674	Davidson Nwaeramo	Solomon Islands United Party	1,394	16.05	
West Kwara'Ae	9,674	Bernard Gale	People's Alliance Party	1,349	15.53	
West Kwara'Ae	9,674	Francis Lomo	Independent	487	5.61	
West Kwara'Ae	9,674	Charles Dausabea	People's Progressive Party	341	3.93	
West Kwara'Ae	9,674	Robert Lafisi	People First Party	56	0.64	
West Kwara'Ae	9,674	Rejected votes		13	0.15	
West Makira	7,140	Derick Rawcliff Manu'ari	Solomon Islands Democratic Party	2,637	43.47	Re-elected
West Makira	7,140	Matthew Ha'asuramo Taro	People's Alliance Party	690	11.37	
West Makira	7,140	Elsie Maesui Dirimae	Independent	640	10.55	
West Makira	7,140	Jackson Sunaone	Independent	518	8.54	
West Makira	7,140	Tommy Mana	United Democratic Party	397	6.54	
West Makira	7,140	Robert Abeniha'a Chow	Solomon Islands Party for Rural Advancement	362	5.97	
West Makira	7,140	Dick Inoana Ha'amori	Independent	240	3.96	
West Makira	7,140	Lloyd Tahani	People First Party	162	2.67	
West Makira	7,140	Gideon Suharahu Row	Democratic Alliance Party	115	1.90	
West Makira	7,140	Presley Aridariu	Independent	82	1.35	
West Makira	7,140	Kennedy Hoda	Independent	79	1.30	
West Makira	7,140	JR Solomon Mamaloni	Kadere Party	47	0.77	
West Makira	7,140	John Ta'Aru	Independent	34	0.56	
West Makira	7,140	Peter Mcdonald Baewai	Solomon Islands United Party	32	0.53	
West Makira	7,140	Japhet Waipora	Independent	17	0.28	
West Makira	7,140	Rejected votes		14	0.23	
West New Georgia/Vona Vona	8,383	Silas Kerry Vaqara Tausinga	Independent	1,887	27.86	Re-elected
West New Georgia/Vona Vona	8,383	George Temahua	Independent	1,582	23.35	
West New Georgia/Vona Vona	8,383	Mamu Hebala Paza	Independent	1,155	17.05	
West New Georgia/Vona Vona	8,383	Billy Veo	Independent	924	13.64	
West New Georgia/Vona Vona	8,383	Dickson Kaehuna	Independent	538	7.94	
West New Georgia/Vona Vona	8,383	Francis John Zama	Independent	433	6.39	
West New Georgia/Vona Vona	8,383	Calvin Ziru	Independent	248	3.66	
West New Georgia/Vona Vona	8,383	Rejected votes		7	0.10	

== Aftermath ==
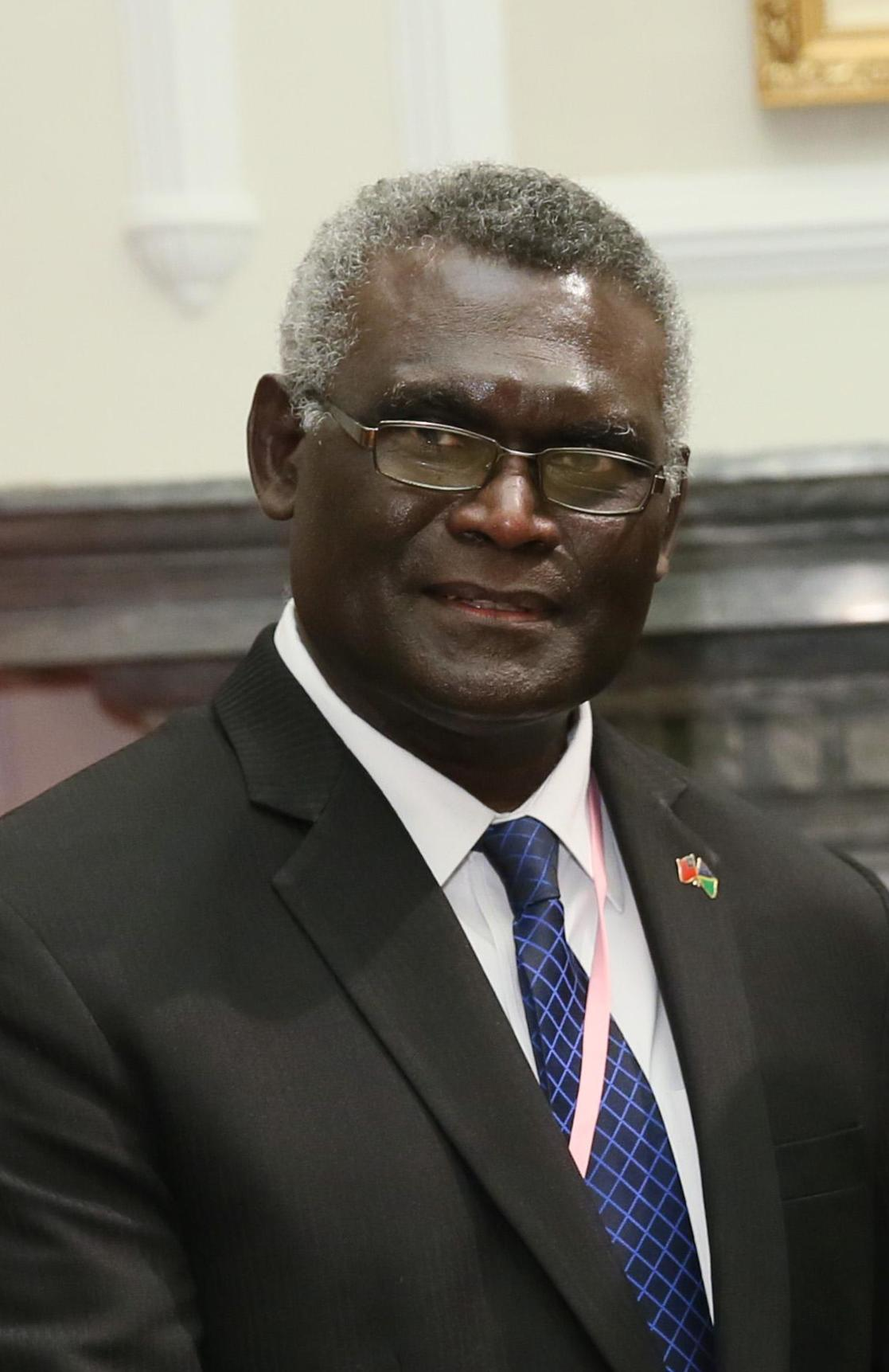
Manasseh Sogavare was elected to a fourth non-consecutive term as prime minister

Following the election, negotiations to form a government commenced. Two blocs emerged to compete to take the reins of government. One bloc, the Grand Coalition, was composed of the United Democratic Party, the Solomon Islands Democratic Party and the Solomon Islands United Party. The Grand Coalition initially announced that Peter Kenilorea Jr. would be the bloc's candidate for prime minister but ended up nominating Matthew Wale. The Grand Coalition did not explain why they ultimately settled on Wale. Former Prime Minister Manasseh Sogavare relaunched the Ownership, Unity and Responsibility Party (OUR Party) shortly after the election, which, along with the Kadere, People First and Democratic Alliance parties, formed the Democratic Coalition Government for Advancement (DCGA). Sogavare was the DCGA bloc's nominee for prime minister.

Wale filed a lawsuit challenging Sogavare's candidacy, claiming he was ineligible to stand for prime minister because he registered his party after the election, a breach of electoral law. Governor-General Frank Kabui scheduled the election for the prime minister to occur on 24 April. Amid fears of violence, police officers were deployed around parliament. The police commission also denied a request by a youth group to protest the prime minister's election. The courts issued an injunction to parliament shortly before the scheduled poll, ordering the postponement of the vote. However, utilising the privilege of immunity from the courts, Governor-General Kabui instructed the vote to proceed. Kabui stated that his decision was following the constitution, which grants the governor-general the final decision over any disputes regarding the election of the head of government. In response, Wale and the 14 other members of the Grand Coalition boycotted the vote. Parliament elected Sogavare to a fourth non-consecutive term as prime minister; he received 35 votes, although one was spoilt. Wale subsequently became the opposition leader. Sogavare's return to the premiership sparked riots in Honiara due to public dissatisfaction over the prime minister's election and the lack of involvement citizens had with the government formation. In late May, the courts dismissed Sogavare's eligibility case; Chief Justice Albert Palmer stated that the late party registration referenced repealed laws, while the case against the governor-general's decision referred to a law that conflicted with the constitution. Palmer also commented that it was not the court's job to fix deficient legislation.

The first convention of the 11th Parliament occurred on 15 May. That day, the new parliament elected former cabinet minister Patteson Oti, who had most recently served as high commissioner to Fiji, as speaker. Sogavare's OUR Party saw numerous MPs join and by November 2019 the party had gained a decisive majority in parliament, occupying 32 seats.

== See also ==
- 11th Parliament of Solomon Islands
