= Freda Soria Comua =

Solomon Islands politician

The Honourable Freda Soria Comua MP
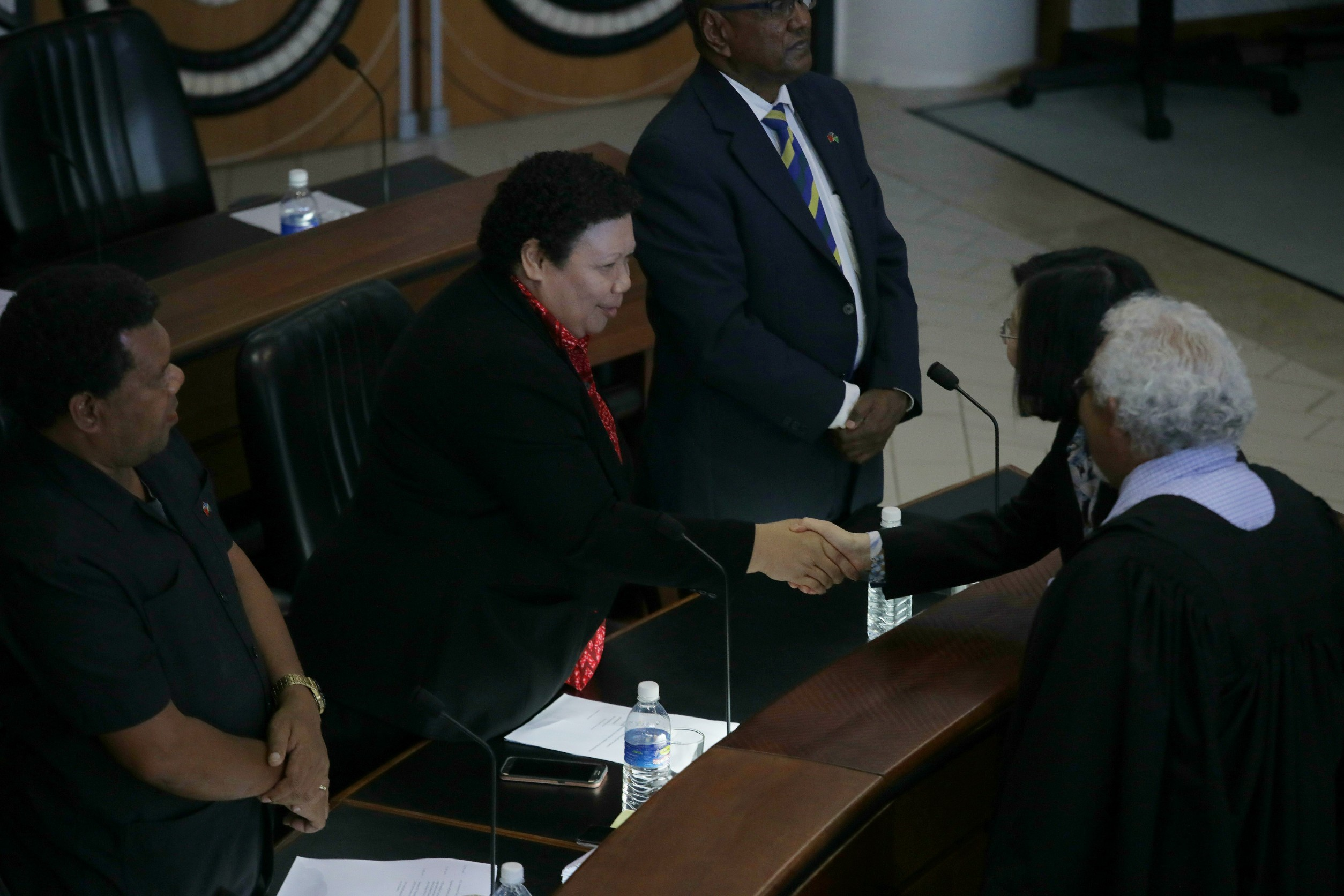
- Comua (left) shakes hand with the President of Republic of China (Taiwan), Tsai Ing-wen inside the House of Parliament of National Parliament of Solomon Islands on 11 November 2017.

Member of the Solomon Islands Parliament for Temotu Vatud
- In office 19 November 2014 – 8 October 2018
- Incumbent
- Assumed office 3 April 2019

Minister of Women, Youth, and Children's Affairs
- In office 18 August 2015 – 8 October 2018
- Succeeded by: Lanelle Tanangada

Minister of Rural Development
- In office 15 December 2014 – 18 August 2015

Personal details
- Party: Kadere Party

Freda Tuki Soriocomua (usually referred to as Freda Soria Comua) is a politician of Solomon Islands who served as Minister of Rural Development from 15 December 2014 to 18 August 2015 and subsequently as Minister of Women, Youth, and Children's Affairs from 18 August 2015 to 8 October 2018 when she was removed from office after being found guilty of vote buying or corruption by the Solomon Islands High Court. She re-gained her seat as a Member of Parliament representing the Temotu Vatud constituency at the 2019 general elections.

Soria Comua was the only successful female candidate in the 2014 general elections and one of two in the 2019 general elections, the other being her successor as Minister of Women, Youth, and Children's Affairs, Lanelle Tanangada.
