= Jimmie Rodgers (doctor) =

Doctor and Solomon Islander politician

Sir Jimmie Rodgers KCMG

Secretary to Prime Minister's Special Duties
- Incumbent
- Assumed office 16 February 2025

Secretary to the Prime Minister
- In office 25 June 2018 – 26 June 2024
- Preceded by: Fred Isom Rohorua
- Succeeded by: Melchior Mataki

Director-General of the South Pacific Commission
- In office 6 Jan 2006 – 5 Jan 2014
- Preceded by: Lourdes Pangelinan
- Succeeded by: Collin Tukuitonga

Personal details
- Education: Fiji School of Medicine

Sir Jimmie Rodgers is a doctor who currently serves as Secretary to Prime Minister's Special Duties, and previously served as Secretary to the Prime Minister (SPM) in the Solomon Islands. He was awarded a knighthood in February 2025 for his services to health, public service and the community.

== Education ==
In 1980, Rodgers graduated from the Fiji School of Medicine. He later gained postgraduate qualifications in anesthesia (New Zealand) and health administration (Australia).

== Career ==
Rodgers was the Chief Medical Officer at the Solomon Islands National Hospital for several years. He also previously worked at the Ministry of Health and Medical Services, where he served as under-secretary of Health Care for over six years.

Between 2006 and 2014, Rodgers served as Director-General of the South Pacific Commission (SPC), during which he contributed to the expansion of the Pacific Health Surveillance Network within the World Health Organization.

On 25 June 2018, Rodgers was appointed SPM by then Prime Minister Rick Hou, after having served briefly as Permanent Secretary for the Ministry of Education and Human Resource Development.

During the 2020 COVID-19 pandemic, Rodgers played a key role coordinating the Solomon Islands government's response as the countries primary health spokesperson. He also served as vice-chair of the COVID-19 Oversight Committee (OSC) and chaired the Vessel Exemption Committee.

He also served as Chairman of the National Hosting Authority for the 2023 Pacific Games in Honiara and the Solomon Islands National Provident Fund.

On February 6, 2025, Rodgers received the Knight Commander of the Order of St Michael and St George (KCMG) for his services to health, public service and the community.
