= Kadere Party =

- Founder: Peter Boyers
- Founded: 2014; 12 years ago
- Ideology: Shipping and logging workers’ interests
- Slogan: Economics and Governance Transformation
- National Parliament: 1 / 50

The Kadere Party is a political party in Solomon Islands. It tends to be most popular among those in the shipping and logging industries.

== History ==
The Kadere Party has been part of coalition governments. In the 2024 Solomon Islands general election the party campaigned under the slogan “Economics and Governance Transformation”.

== Members of Parliament ==
=== 2019 ===
- Ishmael Avui
- Commins Mewa
- Samuel Manetoali
- Freda Soria Comua
- Bartholomew Parapolo
- Lanelle Tanangada
- Willie Marau
- John Maneniaru

=== 2024 ===
- Ethel Lency Vokia

== Election results ==
| Election | Votes | % | Seats | +/– |
|---|---|---|---|---|
| 2014 | 11,999 | 4.67 (#3) | 1 / 50 | New |
| 2019 | 29,426 | 9.50 (#3) | 8 / 50 | ▲7 |
| 2024 | 16,906 | 4.89 (#4) | 1 / 50 | ▼7 |
