= United Democratic Party (Solomon Islands) =

Political party in the Solomon Islands

The United Democratic Party was a political party in the Solomon Islands.

== History ==
The party won 7 seats in the 2014 general election.

== Members of Parliament ==
- Jimson Tanangada
- Danny Philip
- Clezy Rore
- John Moffat Fugui
- Makario Tagini

== Electoral history ==
Election	Votes	%	Seats	+/–
2014 general election	27,550	10.72	5	New
2019 general election	25,295	8.17	4	–1
