= Democratic Alliance Party (Solomon Islands) =

Solomon Islands political party

- Leader: Rick Houenipwela
- Split from: Solomon Islands Democratic Party
- National Parliament: 1 / 50

The Democratic Alliance Party is a political party in the Solomon Islands led by Rick Houenipwela.

== History ==
The DAP supports maintaining the country's alliance with Taiwan.

In the 2014 general elections, the party won seven seats, becoming the largest party in Parliament.

== Election results ==
Election	Votes	%	Seats	+/–
2014	19,992	7.78 (#2)	7 / 50	New
2019	19,720	6.37 (#5)	3 / 50	▼4
2024	5,515	1.59 (#10)	4 / 50	▲1
