= 2014 Solomon Islands general election =

- 19 November 2014
- All 50 seats in the National Parliament; 26 seats needed for a majority
- Turnout: 89.93% (▲36.86pp)
Party	Leader	Vote %	Seats	+/–
United Democratic	Thomas Ko Chan	10.72	5	New
Democratic Alliance	Steve Abana	7.78	7	New
Kadere Party	Alfred Legua	4.67	1	New
People First	Jimmie Rodgers	4.51	1	New
People's Alliance	Nathaniel Waena	4.44	3	+3
SIPRA	Gordon Darcy Lilo	3.90	1	−3
Independents	–	56.27	32	+12
This lists parties that won seats. See the complete results below.
Prime Minister before	Prime Minister after
Gordon Darcy Lilo; SIPRA	Manasseh Sogavare; Independent

General elections were held in the Solomon Islands on 19 November 2014 to determine the composition of the 10th Parliament. The election was held following the passage of the Political Parties Integrity Bill, which sought to discourage party-switching. A biometric voter registration system was introduced before the election, which removed a large number of double enrolments and deceased voters from the electoral roll. Six of the twelve parties that contested the election won seats. The Democratic Alliance emerged as the largest, winning seven. Independents, who comprised the majority of candidates, won 32 of the 50 seats in the National Parliament. Only one woman was elected. Voter turnout was a record 89%. In an upset, Prime Minister Gordon Darcy Lilo lost his seat of Gizo/Kolombangara to his nephew Jimson Tanagada.

Following the election, two blocs emerged to attempt to form a government. The Democratic Coalition for Change (DCC) comprised the Kadere Party, the United Democratic Party (UDP) and numerous independents. The DCC nominated Manasseh Sogavare, who had previously served as prime minister two times, as its candidate for prime minister. The Solomon Islands People's Democratic Coalition (SIPDC) was made up of the Democratic Alliance, the People's Alliance, the People First Party and the Solomon Islands Party for Rural Advancement (SIPRA). Jeremiah Manele, a first-term member of parliament, was the SIPDC's prime ministerial nominee. In a parliamentary vote on 9 December, Sogavare defeated Manele.

== Background ==
=== 2010 general election ===
The 2010 general election resulted in no party winning a majority of seats. Independent candidates won the most seats, while the Solomon Islands Democratic Party (SIDP) emerged as the largest party. A record 508 candidates ran in the election, the overwhelming majority of whom were independents. None of the 22 female contestants were successful.

Following the election, negotiations to form a government commenced. Two blocs announced nominees for prime minister, with SIDP Leader Steve Abana facing veteran politician and former Deputy Prime Minister Danny Philip. Abana was nominated by a bloc comprising his SIDP, the Solomon Islands Party for Rural Advancement (SIPRA), and the parties of outgoing Prime Minister Derek Sikua's Coalition for National Unity and Rural Advancement government. Philip was selected by a camp made up of his Reform Democratic Party, in addition to a faction of SIPRA, independents and five other parties. In a parliamentary vote on 25 August, Philip won by a narrow margin of 26 votes, defeating Abana, who received 23, while one vote was invalidated. Unlike in 2006, no unrest occurred in Honiara after the prime ministerial election. On 26 August, government MP Steve Laore died suddenly, leaving Philip's coalition at risk of losing its majority. The opposition attempted to convince government MP and former Prime Minister Snyder Rini to defect following rumours that he planned to leave the government. Philip affirmed that Rini remained in the governing coalition and appointed him as minister of national planning and aid coordination.

=== Resignation of Danny Philip ===
Amid allegations of corruption and a mismanagement of government funds, Philip resigned as prime minister on 11 November 2011, shortly before parliament was scheduled to vote on a no-confidence motion filed by Opposition Leader Derek Sikua. Three ministers had resigned the week before, stating that they had lost confidence in Philip's leadership and accused him of abusing his position. Philip also sacked Finance Minister Gordon Darcy Lilo and Public Service Minister Rick Houenipwela the day before his resignation, alleging they were undermining his government. Philip stated that he resigned in response to pressure from the public and not the opposition. Despite his resignation, Philip remained in the governing National Coalition for Rural Advancement. On 17 November, parliament elected Lilo to succeed Philip. Protests subsequently erupted outside parliament, demanding Lilo resign. While Lilo disavowed his predecessor's alleged corruption, he stated that his government was a continuation of Philip's.

=== Political party reform ===
In 2013, Lilo introduced the Political Parties Integrity Bill, which aimed to strengthen the political party system and prevent "grasshopper behaviour", the frequent party-switching of MPs. The bill also sought to encourage MPs to affiliate with a registered political party rather than be independents. The lack of MPs affiliated with a party in previous parliaments was widely viewed as a source of instability. Parties in Solomon Islands have tended to be small, personality-based and lacking clear ideologies. As a result, party membership is often fluid, with party-switching, known locally as "grass hopping", a common occurrence. In October of that year, parliament rejected the prime minister's bill. Parliament approved an amended bill, the Political Parties Integrity Act (PPIA), in June 2014 that removed the restrictions on independents. The opposition alleged that the speaker rushed the bill through parliament. A Political Parties Commission was established to oversee the act's implementation, while the Register of Political Parties would handle the amalgamation, registration and deregistration of parties. The PPIA also sought to increase women's participation in the democratic process by mandating that at least 10% of candidates fielded by a party are women. Parties that lack female members to fulfil this quota are exempt.

== Electoral system ==
The 50 members of the National Parliament were elected in single-member constituencies via first-past-the-post voting. Candidates were required to be at least 21 years old and be residents of the constituency they contested. Individuals ineligible to be candidates included those who held dual citizenship, were executives or members of the Electoral Commission, had an undischarged bankruptcy, had been imprisoned for more than six months, or were under a death sentence.

Voters had to be at least 18 years old and hold Solomon Islands citizenship. Individuals ineligible to vote included those who had committed a breach of the electoral law, been declared insane, had served a prison sentence for at least six months or were under a death sentence. Citizens resident outside of Solomon Islands were unable to vote. Following widespread allegations that the electoral roll was incredibly bloated, Prime Minister Lilo introduced a biometric voter registration process before the election. commencing on 10 March. The enrolment process was later extended to 2 May, following flash floods. The new registration system purged the names of deceased voters and double enrollments, resulting in a sharp reduction of registrations on the electoral roll from 448,149 in 2010 to 287,562 in 2014. The Electoral Commission did not make arrangements for citizens studying abroad or individuals who would turn 18 before the election but after the registration deadline to enrol, leaving these cohorts unable to vote. Lilo also introduced voter identification cards to prevent individuals from voting multiple times.

== Parties and candidates ==
A total of 443 candidates were nominated to contest the election, a decrease from 509 at the 2010 election. Just 26 candidates were women, comprising 6% of all contestants. The majority of candidates were independents, while 12 registered parties contested the election.

Party	Leader	Candidates	Ref(s).			
Party	Leader	Candidates	Ref(s).	Solomon Islands Party for Rural Advancement	Gordon Darcy Lilo	11
Direct Development Party	Dick Haʻamori	3				
People's Alliance Party	Nathaniel Waena	33				
New Nation Party	—N/a	6				
Democratic Alliance Party	Steve Abana	13				
Kadere Party	Alfred Legua	20				
National Transformation Party	Ellison Bako	23				
Pan Melanesian Congress Party	Martin Matai	17				
People First Party	Jimmie Rodgers	24				
People's Progressive Party	Charles Dausabea	3				
United Democratic Party	Thomas Ko Chan	35				
Youth Owned Rural and Urban Party	—N/a	10				
Independents	—N/a	246				

== Campaign ==
The campaign season began on 7 October. Significant issues included financial mismanagement and corruption. Other prominent issues were the PPIA, education and healthcare. The election occurred following large economic growth, mainly from the extractive industries, especially logging. The People First Party, led by Jimmie Rodgers, campaigned to expand the tourism industry. Rodgers believed tourism would be a viable economic substitute when the logging industry was deprived. Prime Minister Lilo's SIPRA campaigned on its record in government and pledged to continue the economic growth. Lilo stated that SIPRA would focus on expanding the agricultural, tourism and forestry sectors. The prime minister also promised to abolish the plurality voting system. A Kadere Party candidate alleged that the party's contestants were plagued by delays in campaign funds, causing some to use their personal finances. Kadere Party President Alfred Legua denied the claims.

== Conduct ==
The dissolution of the ninth parliament occurred on 9 September, and Governor-General Frank Kabui confirmed the election date on 11 October. On election day, polling stations were open from 7:00 to 17:00. The election was the first since the withdrawal of the military-competent of the Regional Assistance Mission to Solomon Islands (RAMSI) in 2013, with the Royal Solomon Islands Police Force assuming the lead responsibility for election security. Transparency Solomon Islands (TSI) claimed to have received anecdotal evidence of some candidates collecting voter ID cards. TSI Executive Daniel Fenua said candidates would return the ID cards to voters shortly before the election with some money, encouraging electors to vote in the candidates' favour. TSI and MP Manasseh Sogavare called for the government to outlaw the practice. The Commonwealth delegation stated that the election was peaceful. An Australian observer group said the electoral process ran smoothly. After the polls closed, an election official attempted to steal a ballot box as it was being transported near the Malaitan provincial capital of Auki. The police chased the official, who dropped the box and fled into the jungle. Vote counting commenced on 20 November.

== Results ==
Independents won 32 seats, while six parties secured parliamentary representation. The Democratic Alliance emerged as the largest party, winning seven seats. The UDP, which secured five seats, was the party that won the most votes, attaining 10%. Prime Minister Lilo lost his seat of Gizo/Kolombangara in an upset to his nephew Jimson Tanangada of the UDP. Freda Soria Comua of the People's Alliance Party was the only woman to win a seat. The sole incumbent female MP, Vika Lusibaea, who entered parliament following a 2012 by-election, lost re-election. Comua became the third woman elected to the National Parliament since independence. Voter turnout was 89%, the highest in the nation's history.

Party	Votes	%	Seats	+/–
United Democratic Party	27,550	10.72	5	New
Democratic Alliance Party	19,992	7.78	7	New
Kadere Party	11,999	4.67	1	New
People First Party	11,601	4.51	1	New
People's Alliance Party	11,414	4.44	3	+3
Solomon Islands Party for Rural Advancement	10,022	3.90	1	–3
National Transformation Party	7,336	2.85	0	New
Pan Melanesian Congress Party	5,421	2.11	0	New
Youth Owned Rural and Urban Party	3,666	1.43	0	New
Direct Development Party	1,961	0.76	0	–3
New Nation Party	795	0.31	0	0
People's Progressive Party	616	0.24	0	New
Independents	144,599	56.27	32	+12
Total	256,972	100.00	50	0
Valid votes	256,972	99.37		
Invalid/blank votes	1,627	0.63		
Total votes	258,599	100.00		
Registered voters/turnout	287,562	89.93		
Source: SI Election Resources, SIEC, Election Passport

=== By constituency ===
Results by constituency
Constituency	Electorate	Candidate	Party	Votes	%	Notes
Aoke/Langalanga	7,016	Matthew Wale	Independent	2,760	41.93	Re-elected
Aoke/Langalanga	7,016	David Faradatolo	Democratic Alliance Party	1,966	29.87	
Aoke/Langalanga	7,016	Tony Wale	Kadere Party	979	14.87	
Aoke/Langalanga	7,016	Wilson Giloa Ne'e	Independent	784	11.91	
Aoke/Langalanga	7,016	Robert Wales Feraltelia	Solomon Islands Party for Rural Advancement	26	0.40	
Aoke/Langalanga	7,016	Peter Kobiloko	Independent	24	0.36	
Aoke/Langalanga	7,016	John Jarett Maga	Independent	21	0.32	
Aoke/Langalanga	7,016	Rejected votes		22	0.33	
Baegu/Asifola	6,019	David Tome	Independent	1,904	35.44	Re-elected
Baegu/Asifola	6,019	Tagini Makario	Independent	1,759	32.74	
Baegu/Asifola	6,019	Henry Ologa Olobeni	Independent	1,394	25.94	
Baegu/Asifola	6,019	Vincent Lyumann Fiuta	Independent	136	2.53	
Baegu/Asifola	6,019	Peter Falimae	Independent	47	0.87	
Baegu/Asifola	6,019	John Anthony Wate	People First Party	36	0.67	
Baegu/Asifola	6,019	George Edward Osifelo	National Transformation Party	19	0.35	
Baegu/Asifola	6,019	Silas Fakani	Independent	11	0.20	
Baegu/Asifola	6,019	Augustine Diau Taenao	Pan Melanesian Congress Party	9	0.17	
Baegu/Asifola	6,019	Rejected votes		58	1.08	
Central Guadalcanal	5,156	Peter Shannel Agovaka	Independent	2,083	42.53	Re-elected
Central Guadalcanal	5,156	Walton Naezol	United Democratic Party	1,446	29.52	
Central Guadalcanal	5,156	Ribson Nunua Tinbaku	Independent	697	14.23	
Central Guadalcanal	5,156	Patrick Kennedy	Direct Development Party	270	5.51	
Central Guadalcanal	5,156	Noelyne Biliki	People's Alliance Party	114	2.33	
Central Guadalcanal	5,156	Elvish Kekegolo	Pan Melanesian Congress Party	91	1.86	
Central Guadalcanal	5,156	Matilda Tosa Elta	National Transformation Party	78	1.59	
Central Guadalcanal	5,156	George Solomon Sovekibo	Independent	52	1.06	
Central Guadalcanal	5,156	Brendan Muna	Independent	47	0.96	
Central Guadalcanal	5,156	Rejected votes		20	0.41	
Central Honiara	13,529	John Moffat Fugui	Independent	2,897	25.00	Re-elected
Central Honiara	13,529	Frank Aote'e	People First Party	1,765	15.23	
Central Honiara	13,529	Jonathan Aqarao Zama	Youth Owned Rural and Urban Party	1,742	15.04	
Central Honiara	13,529	Vika Lusibaea	Independent	1,286	11.10	
Central Honiara	13,529	Eric Tema	Independent	1,057	9.12	
Central Honiara	13,529	Jack Igi	Pan Melanesian Congress Party	911	7.86	
Central Honiara	13,529	Mark Ronald Tonowane	Independent	466	4.02	
Central Honiara	13,529	Francis Idu	United Democratic Party	447	3.86	
Central Honiara	13,529	Fred Peter	Solomon Islands Party for Rural Advancement	444	3.83	
Central Honiara	13,529	George Mamimu	National Transformation Party	348	3.00	
Central Honiara	13,529	Tilaila Nilkapp Buarafi	Independent	74	0.64	
Central Honiara	13,529	Hilda Thugea Kari	People's Alliance Party	51	0.44	
Central Honiara	13,529	Rejected votes		98	0.85	
Central Kwara'ae	6,590	Jackson Fiulaua	Independent	1,558	25.82	Re-elected
Central Kwara'ae	6,590	Ben Bau	Independent	1,018	16.87	
Central Kwara'ae	6,590	John Niroa Misite'e	Independent	693	11.48	
Central Kwara'ae	6,590	Philip Damirara Akote'e	Independent	634	10.51	
Central Kwara'ae	6,590	Eddie N Leamae	Kadere Party	455	7.54	
Central Kwara'ae	6,590	Barnabas Henson	United Democratic Party	360	5.97	
Central Kwara'ae	6,590	Billy A. Manu	Democratic Alliance Party	265	4.39	
Central Kwara'ae	6,590	Alick Maeaba	Independent	214	3.55	
Central Kwara'ae	6,590	Israel Maeoli	People First Party	185	3.07	
Central Kwara'ae	6,590	David Dausabea	Independent	179	2.97	
Central Kwara'ae	6,590	Richard Na'amo Irosaea	Independent	145	2.40	
Central Kwara'ae	6,590	Eric Takila	National Transformation Party	125	2.07	
Central Kwara'ae	6,590	Collin Maenunu Sigimanu	Solomon Islands Party for Rural Advancement	81	1.34	
Central Kwara'ae	6,590	Rose Anilabata	People's Alliance Party	40	0.66	
Central Kwara'ae	6,590	John Ossi Gafana	Independent	33	0.55	
Central Kwara'ae	6,590	Ann Tanny Oromae	Independent	31	0.51	
Central Kwara'ae	6,590	Clifton Kala	Independent	4	0.07	
Central Kwara'ae	6,590	Rejected votes		15	0.25	
Central Makira	4,226	Nestor Ghiro	Independent	1,047	28.02	Elected
Central Makira	4,226	Hypolite Taremae	Independent	1,014	27.13	Unseated
Central Makira	4,226	Julian Maka'a	Independent	303	8.11	
Central Makira	4,226	Emmanuel Wuriruma Tora	Independent	302	8.08	
Central Makira	4,226	Philip Paikai Apela	Independent	274	7.33	
Central Makira	4,226	Everlyn Kahia	People's Alliance Party	240	6.42	
Central Makira	4,226	Moon Pin Kwan	Independent	210	5.62	
Central Makira	4,226	Jerry Tauni	Independent	107	2.86	
Central Makira	4,226	Noel Daley Mamau	Kadere Party	75	2.01	
Central Makira	4,226	Joseph Tamuatara	Independent	56	1.50	
Central Makira	4,226	Charles Ureie	Independent	55	1.47	
Central Makira	4,226	Gwendolyn Rumu Masuguria	Independent	23	0.62	
Central Makira	4,226	Cecil Meimana	Independent	5	0.13	
Central Makira	4,226	Rejected votes		26	0.70	
East ꞌAreꞌare	4,932	Andrew Manepora'a	Kadere Party of Solomon Islands	2,378	51.97	Re-elected
East ꞌAreꞌare	4,932	Andrew Hanaria Keniasina	Independent	1,913	41.81	
East ꞌAreꞌare	4,932	Edward Jacob Ronia	New Nation Party	194	4.24	
East ꞌAreꞌare	4,932	John Maxwell Harunari	People's Alliance Party	79	1.73	
East ꞌAreꞌare	4,932	Rejected votes		12	0.26	
East Central Guadalcanal	5,988	Ishmael Mali Avui	United Democratic Party	1,746	31.21	Elected
East Central Guadalcanal	5,988	Joseph Onika	Independent	1,357	24.25	Unseated
East Central Guadalcanal	5,988	Joseph Tapalia	Independent	643	11.49	
East Central Guadalcanal	5,988	Reuben Tovutovu	People's Alliance Party	526	9.40	
East Central Guadalcanal	5,988	Tony Joseph Koraua	Independent	464	8.29	
East Central Guadalcanal	5,988	Nollen C. Leni	People First Party	437	7.81	
East Central Guadalcanal	5,988	Molia Gemali	Independent	244	4.36	
East Central Guadalcanal	5,988	Daniel Ogu Besa'a Kerevale	Independent	140	2.50	
East Central Guadalcanal	5,988	Gregory Ezra Awa	Independent	12	0.21	
East Central Guadalcanal	5,988	Rejected votes		26	0.46	
East Choiseul	3,074	Manasseh Sogavare	Independent	1,596	63.08	Re-elected
East Choiseul	3,074	Ronald Pitamama	Democratic Alliance Party	602	23.79	
East Choiseul	3,074	James Ron Kaboke	People First Party	320	12.65	
East Choiseul	3,074	Rejected votes		12	0.47	
East Guadalcanal	6,124	Bradley Tovosia	Independent	3,377	59.96	Re-elected
East Guadalcanal	6,124	Bendick Tova	United Democratic Party	1,058	18.79	
East Guadalcanal	6,124	George Tausiria	Kadere Party	522	9.27	
East Guadalcanal	6,124	Sampson Tahuniara	New Nation Party	340	6.04	
East Guadalcanal	6,124	Jack Koti	People First Party	278	4.94	
East Guadalcanal	6,124	Enif Petsakibo	Pan Melanesian Congress Party	27	0.48	
East Guadalcanal	6,124	Rejected votes		30	0.53	
East Honiara	10,470	Douglas Ete	Independent	2,394	26.95	Re-elected
East Honiara	10,470	John Kabolo	Pan Melanesian Congress Party	1,494	16.82	
East Honiara	10,470	Riley Mesepitu	National Transformation Party	1,169	13.16	
East Honiara	10,470	Bernard Ghiro	Independent	1,038	11.68	
East Honiara	10,470	Paul Maenu'u	Independent	1,027	11.56	
East Honiara	10,470	Jimmy Ramoli	Independent	651	7.33	
East Honiara	10,470	David Iro Fulaga	Independent	294	3.31	
East Honiara	10,470	Samson Faisi	United Democratic Party	228	2.57	
East Honiara	10,470	Charles Kira	Youth Owned Rural and Urban Party	222	2.50	
East Honiara	10,470	David Belo Maelaua	People First Party	130	1.46	
East Honiara	10,470	Timothy Omani	Independent	107	1.20	
East Honiara	10,470	Elwin Taloimatakwa	Independent	42	0.47	
East Honiara	10,470	Catherine Adifaka	New Nation Party	17	0.19	
East Honiara	10,470	Patrick T Turanga	Independent	16	0.18	
East Honiara	10,470	Paul Ritchie Suri	People's Alliance Party	15	0.17	
East Honiara	10,470	Bartholomew Muaki Vakisoro	Independent	6	0.07	
East Honiara	10,470	Rejected votes		34	0.38	
East Kwaio	6,615	Stanley Festus Sofu	Independent	2,748	46.81	Re-elected
East Kwaio	6,615	Alfred Solomon Sasako	Direct Development Party	988	16.83	
East Kwaio	6,615	Diki Kolosu	Independent	501	8.53	
East Kwaio	6,615	John Taniamae	Solomon Islands Party for Rural Advancement	472	8.04	
East Kwaio	6,615	Robert Firigeni	Kadere Party	418	7.12	
East Kwaio	6,615	Simon Baete	People First Party	227	3.87	
East Kwaio	6,615	Wilfred Mete	Independent	117	1.99	
East Kwaio	6,615	Joseph Shem Bibiasi	Pan Melanesian Congress Party	101	1.72	
East Kwaio	6,615	Genesis Eddie Kofana	Independent	76	1.29	
East Kwaio	6,615	Joseph Elvis Isafi	National Transformation Party	74	1.26	
East Kwaio	6,615	Herikdun Bubunaia Siope	Independent	72	1.23	
East Kwaio	6,615	Jimmy Masa	People's Alliance Party	29	0.49	
East Kwaio	6,615	Rejected votes		48	0.82	
East Makira	7,426	Alfred Ghiro	Democratic Alliance Party	2,225	32.61	Re-elected
East Makira	7,426	Charles Jordan Maefai	United Democratic Party	1,908	27.96	
East Makira	7,426	Henry Aife Murray	People's Alliance Party	1,722	25.24	
East Makira	7,426	Stanley S. Siapu	Independent	320	4.69	
East Makira	7,426	Moses Haganitoto	National Transformation Party	248	3.63	
East Makira	7,426	Marcel Gapu	Independent	201	2.95	
East Makira	7,426	Warren Tereqora	Independent	144	2.11	
East Makira	7,426	Fox Qwaina	People First Party	33	0.48	
East Makira	7,426	Rejected votes		22	0.32	
East Malaita	5,377	Manasseh Maelanga	Independent	2,992	62.18	Re-elected
East Malaita	5,377	Jimson Iakwai	Pan Melanesian Congress Party	896	18.62	
East Malaita	5,377	Rex Alafa	United Democratic Party	501	10.41	
East Malaita	5,377	Paul Ofea	Independent	185	3.84	
East Malaita	5,377	Michael Lautagi	People's Alliance Party	109	2.27	
East Malaita	5,377	Eddie Misitee Leanafaka	Kadere Party	70	1.45	
East Malaita	5,377	Leonard Solomon Saii	Independent	48	1.00	
East Malaita	5,377	Rejected votes		11	0.23	
Fataleka	4,587	Steve William Abana	Independent	1,413	33.11	Re-elected
Fataleka	4,587	Sevrino Maegwali	Independent	1,010	23.67	
Fataleka	4,587	Allen Siau	People First Party	423	9.91	
Fataleka	4,587	Felix Taloinao Laumae Kabini	Independent	418	9.80	
Fataleka	4,587	Charles Dausabea	People's Progressive Party	385	9.02	
Fataleka	4,587	Maesua David Jack	Independent	224	5.25	
Fataleka	4,587	Movin Kutaxation Kutai	Pan Melanesian Congress Party	116	2.72	
Fataleka	4,587	Nickson Martin Atu	Kadere Party	99	2.32	
Fataleka	4,587	Hellen Luiramo Hodges	Independent	98	2.30	
Fataleka	4,587	Peter Bubulu	Youth Owned Rural and Urban Party	32	0.75	
Fataleka	4,587	Moffat Sanga Fugui	Independent	21	0.49	
Fataleka	4,587	Billy Dauma	Independent	0	0.00	
Fataleka	4,587	Mani Robert	Independent	0	0.00	
Fataleka	4,587	Rejected votes		28	0.66	
Gao/Bugotu	5,346	Samuel Manetoali	Independent	3,077	63.12	Re-elected
Gao/Bugotu	5,346	Mathias Aula Loji	Independent	890	18.26	
Gao/Bugotu	5,346	Derick Kolinahiga	Kadere Party	464	9.52	
Gao/Bugotu	5,346	Rhoda Sikilabu	United Democratic Party	370	7.59	
Gao/Bugotu	5,346	Basil Manelegua	Youth Owned Rural and Urban Party	11	0.23	
Gao/Bugotu	5,346	Rejected votes		63	1.29	
Gizo/Kolombangara	6,391	Jimson Fiau Tanangada	United Democratic Party	2,143	39.97	Elected
Gizo/Kolombangara	6,391	Gordon Darcy Lilo	Solomon Islands Party for Rural Advancement	1,901	35.45	Unseated
Gizo/Kolombangara	6,391	Kenneth Bule Hite	Independent	1,093	20.38	
Gizo/Kolombangara	6,391	Schulte Maetoloa	Independent	43	0.80	
Gizo/Kolombangara	6,391	Rejected votes		182	3.39	
Hograno/Kia/Havulei	6,033	Jeremiah Manele	Democratic Alliance Party	3,323	59.79	Elected
Hograno/Kia/Havulei	6,033	Selwyn Riumana	Independent	2,081	37.44	Unseated
Hograno/Kia/Havulei	6,033	Nelson Kehe Kile	People's Alliance Party	133	2.39	
Hograno/Kia/Havulei	6,033	Charles Misari Ravinago	Independent	6	0.11	
Hograno/Kia/Havulei	6,033	Rejected votes		15	0.27	
Lau/Mbaelelea	10,599	Maeue Augustine Auga	Independent	2,513	26.28	Elected
Lau/Mbaelelea	10,599	John Jesse Kwaita	Solomon Islands Party for Rural Advancement	1,808	18.91	
Lau/Mbaelelea	10,599	Lawinter Kaleasi Kii	Independent	1,672	17.49	
Lau/Mbaelelea	10,599	Walter Folotalu	Independent	1,226	12.82	Unseated
Lau/Mbaelelea	10,599	John Dominic Gela	Independent	872	9.12	
Lau/Mbaelelea	10,599	Cleven Furai	Democratic Alliance Party	731	7.65	
Lau/Mbaelelea	10,599	John Meke	Kadere Party	174	1.82	
Lau/Mbaelelea	10,599	Aaron Rubin Olofia	Youth Owned Rural and Urban Party	153	1.60	
Lau/Mbaelelea	10,599	Andrew Rofeta Jionisi	United Democratic Party	123	1.29	
Lau/Mbaelelea	10,599	Judson Lee Leafasia	Independent	64	0.67	
Lau/Mbaelelea	10,599	Walter Samani	National Transformation Party	23	0.24	
Lau/Mbaelelea	10,599	Rejected votes		202	2.11	
Malaita Outer Islands	2,558	Martin Kealoe	Independent	902	38.75	Re-elected
Malaita Outer Islands	2,558	Hugo Kahano	Independent	745	32.00	
Malaita Outer Islands	2,558	Robert Sisilo	People First Party	381	16.37	
Malaita Outer Islands	2,558	Patrick Vahoe	Youth Owned Rural and Urban Party	169	7.26	
Malaita Outer Islands	2,558	Reginald W Aipia	National Transformation Party	77	3.31	
Malaita Outer Islands	2,558	David Junior Ma'ai	Independent	44	1.89	
Malaita Outer Islands	2,558	Rejected votes		10	0.43	
Maringe/Kokota	4,947	Culwick Togamana	Independent	1,594	35.45	Elected
Maringe/Kokota	4,947	Varian Lonamei	Independent	1,062	23.62	Unseated
Maringe/Kokota	4,947	Catherine Launa Nori	People First Party	586	13.03	
Maringe/Kokota	4,947	Ruben Dotho	United Democratic Party	485	10.78	
Maringe/Kokota	4,947	John Perakana Palmer	Independent	248	5.51	
Maringe/Kokota	4,947	Obed Neo	Independent	226	5.03	
Maringe/Kokota	4,947	John Colridge Lolly	Independent	208	4.63	
Maringe/Kokota	4,947	Erick Wilson Koutini	Independent	46	1.02	
Maringe/Kokota	4,947	Rejected votes		42	0.93	
Marovo	6,759	Snyder Rini	Independent	2,347	39.41	Re-elected
Marovo	6,759	Jimmie Rodgers	People First Party	1,728	29.01	
Marovo	6,759	Lester Gideon Ross	Solomon Islands Party for Rural Advancement	1,033	17.34	
Marovo	6,759	Lester Huckle Saomasi	Independent	444	7.45	
Marovo	6,759	Atabani Tahu	Independent	314	5.27	
Marovo	6,759	Leeroy Valarane Joshua	National Transformation Party	63	1.06	
Marovo	6,759	Lore Reuben	Independent	8	0.13	
Marovo	6,759	Rejected votes		19	0.32	
Nggela	9,025	Bartholomew Parapolo	Independent	2,094	24.65	Elected
Nggela	9,025	Janet R Hatimoana	United Democratic Party	1,649	19.41	
Nggela	9,025	Frederick Noel Charles Douglas	Independent	1,346	15.84	
Nggela	9,025	Henry Zimbo	Independent	1,273	14.99	
Nggela	9,025	Mark Roboliu Kemakeza	Independent	449	5.29	
Nggela	9,025	Philip Ashley Soboi	Independent	403	4.74	
Nggela	9,025	Christian Salini	People's Alliance Party	365	4.30	
Nggela	9,025	David Harper	Independent	300	3.53	
Nggela	9,025	Elijah Taikole	Independent	274	3.23	
Nggela	9,025	Stillwest Longden	Kadere Party	143	1.68	
Nggela	9,025	Leonard Vetena Williams	Independent	66	0.78	
Nggela	9,025	Ellison Bai Animamu	Independent	53	0.62	
Nggela	9,025	David Kwan	Independent	30	0.35	
Nggela	9,025	Isa'ac Kito Seko	Independent	25	0.29	
Nggela	9,025	Rejected votes		25	0.29	
North East Guadalcanal	4,937	Derek Sikua	Independent	2,190	46.98	Re-elected
North East Guadalcanal	4,937	Desmond Nimepo Norua	Independent	772	16.56	
North East Guadalcanal	4,937	Jamie Lency Vokia	United Democratic Party	572	12.27	
North East Guadalcanal	4,937	Henry Saea	Independent	517	11.09	
North East Guadalcanal	4,937	Andrew Nanau	People First Party	315	6.76	
North East Guadalcanal	4,937	Stephen Paeni	People's Alliance Party	109	2.34	
North East Guadalcanal	4,937	Timothy John Poe	Independent	75	1.61	
North East Guadalcanal	4,937	Ben Oro	Independent	51	1.09	
North East Guadalcanal	4,937	Alfred Mane Ngelea Lovanitilia	Independent	49	1.05	
North East Guadalcanal	4,937	Rejected votes		12	0.26	
North Guadalcanal	4,748	Samson Maneka	United Democratic Party	1,484	33.46	Elected
North Guadalcanal	4,748	Martin Sopage	Independent	1,228	27.69	Unseated
North Guadalcanal	4,748	Andrew Landa Murray	People First Party	467	10.53	
North Guadalcanal	4,748	Alfred Maeke Junior	Independent	451	10.17	
North Guadalcanal	4,748	Stephen Panga	Independent	285	6.43	
North Guadalcanal	4,748	James Edward Votaia	National Transformation Party	159	3.59	
North Guadalcanal	4,748	Andrew Kuvu	Independent	143	3.22	
North Guadalcanal	4,748	Henry Tobani	Pan Melanesian Congress Party	124	2.80	
North Guadalcanal	4,748	Robert Waisu	New Nation Party	38	0.86	
North Guadalcanal	4,748	Benedict Garimane	People's Alliance Party	31	0.70	
North Guadalcanal	4,748	Rejected votes		25	0.56	
North Malaita	5,841	Jimmy Lusibaea	Independent	2,430	46.15	Elected
North Malaita	5,841	Fredrick Kwanairara	Independent	918	17.44	
North Malaita	5,841	Daniel R Faafunua	People's Alliance Party	628	11.93	
North Malaita	5,841	Job Ngenomea Kabui	National Transformation Party	488	9.27	
North Malaita	5,841	Frederick D Saeni	Independent	301	5.72	
North Malaita	5,841	Jack Iuwi Alairara	Independent	198	3.76	
North Malaita	5,841	Wilson Billy Ra'afiau	Pan Melanesian Congress Party	110	2.09	
North Malaita	5,841	Henry Joses Kanairara	Kadere Party	64	1.22	
North Malaita	5,841	Silas Wawane	Independent	54	1.03	
North Malaita	5,841	Wilfred Baetalua	Independent	46	0.87	
North Malaita	5,841	Shadrach Wilfred Atomea	Youth Owned Rural and Urban Party	14	0.27	
North Malaita	5,841	Rejected votes		14	0.27	
North New Georgia	3,188	John Deane Kuku	Independent	1,508	51.17	Elected
North New Georgia	3,188	Job Dudley Tausinga	Solomon Islands Party for Rural Advancement	1,306	44.32	Unseated
North New Georgia	3,188	Henson Cornelius	Independent	95	3.22	
North New Georgia	3,188	Delores Numa Matangani	People's Alliance Party	26	0.88	
North New Georgia	3,188	Rejected votes		12	0.41	
North Vella Lavella	3,840	Milner Tozaka	People's Alliance Party	1,509	42.54	Re-elected
North Vella Lavella	3,840	Jennings Movobule	Kadere Party	1,194	33.66	
North Vella Lavella	3,840	Clezy Rore	Independent	456	12.86	
North Vella Lavella	3,840	Pye Robert Kuve	United Democratic Party	377	10.63	
North Vella Lavella	3,840	Rejected votes		11	0.31	
North West Choiseul	5,404	Connelly Sadakabatu	Democratic Alliance Party	1,617	34.51	Re-elected
North West Choiseul	5,404	Armstrong Pitakaji	Independent	1,212	25.87	
North West Choiseul	5,404	John Ridd Kure	People First Party	745	15.90	
North West Choiseul	5,404	Ralph Billy Takubala	Pan Melanesian Congress Party	442	9.43	
North West Choiseul	5,404	William Ngodoro Sualalu	Independent	373	7.96	
North West Choiseul	5,404	Clement Pikabatu Kengava	People's Alliance Party	125	2.67	
North West Choiseul	5,404	Collin Bartholomew Ruqebatu	Independent	101	2.16	
North West Choiseul	5,404	Ruth Waririu Votanugu	National Transformation Party	56	1.20	
North West Choiseul	5,404	Rejected votes		14	0.30	
North West Guadalcanal	5,492	Horst Heinz Bodo Dettke	Independent	1,724	33.48	Re-elected
North West Guadalcanal	5,492	Albert Fono	Independent	1,415	27.48	
North West Guadalcanal	5,492	Francis Mocho Belande Sade	United Democratic Party	1,062	20.63	
North West Guadalcanal	5,492	Siriako Usa	People's Alliance Party	483	9.38	
North West Guadalcanal	5,492	John Batista Nano	Independent	426	8.27	
North West Guadalcanal	5,492	Michael Ben Walahoula	Independent	20	0.39	
North West Guadalcanal	5,492	Rejected votes		19	0.37	
Ranongga/Simbo	5,273	Charles Sigoto	Independent	3,132	68.85	Re-elected
Ranongga/Simbo	5,273	Francis Billy Hilly	Independent	611	13.43	
Ranongga/Simbo	5,273	Hampton Bekepio	Pan Melanesian Congress Party	281	6.18	
Ranongga/Simbo	5,273	Winson Tigulu	United Democratic Party	240	5.28	
Ranongga/Simbo	5,273	Gideon Tuke	National Transformation Party	176	3.87	
Ranongga/Simbo	5,273	Joi Steven Bato	People First Party	60	1.32	
Ranongga/Simbo	5,273	Jimmy Stanley	Independent	15	0.33	
Ranongga/Simbo	5,273	Mairy Kotomae	People's Alliance Party	15	0.33	
Ranongga/Simbo	5,273	Rejected votes		19	0.42	
Rennell/Bellona	2,765	Tautai Agikimua Kaitu'u	United Democratic Party	861	38.15	Elected
Rennell/Bellona	2,765	Seth Gukuna	Democratic Alliance Party	799	35.40	Unseated
Rennell/Bellona	2,765	Lence R. Tagosia	Independent	440	19.49	
Rennell/Bellona	2,765	David Puia Tuhanuku	New Nation Party	82	3.63	
Rennell/Bellona	2,765	Amos Teika	Independent	50	2.22	
Rennell/Bellona	2,765	Rejected votes		25	1.11	
Russells/Savo	6,522	Dickson Mua Panakitasi	Independent	3,189	52.75	Re-elected
Russells/Savo	6,522	Oliver Salopuka	Kadere Party	1,261	20.86	
Russells/Savo	6,522	Allan Kemakeza	United Democratic Party	1,225	20.26	
Russells/Savo	6,522	Aenasi Diosi	Independent	136	2.25	
Russells/Savo	6,522	Godfrey Narasia	People First Party	112	1.85	
Russells/Savo	6,522	Leslie Norris Asad	People's Alliance Party	60	0.99	
Russells/Savo	6,522	Walter Ben Turasi	Youth Owned Rural and Urban Party	16	0.26	
Russells/Savo	6,522	Constantine Sekudo	Independent	15	0.25	
Russells/Savo	6,522	John Quan	Independent	14	0.23	
Russells/Savo	6,522	Rejected votes		17	0.28	
Shortland	2,512	Christopher Laore	Independent	938	46.88	Re-elected
Shortland	2,512	Ninamo Otuana	Independent	532	26.59	
Shortland	2,512	Pellion Buare	People's Alliance Party	319	15.94	
Shortland	2,512	Brisbane Amatore	United Democratic Party	185	9.25	
Shortland	2,512	George Taylor	Independent	17	0.85	
Shortland	2,512	Derick Pako	Independent	2	0.10	
Shortland	2,512	Rejected votes		8	0.40	
Small Malaita	8,522	Rick Houenipwela	Democratic Alliance Party	2,784	37.01	Re-elected
Small Malaita	8,522	Edwin Awaioli	People First Party	894	11.88	
Small Malaita	8,522	Christopher Wate	Kadere Party	876	11.64	
Small Malaita	8,522	Joseph Au	United Democratic Party	870	11.56	
Small Malaita	8,522	William Nii Haomae	Independent	786	10.45	
Small Malaita	8,522	Abednigo Maeohu	Independent	736	9.78	
Small Malaita	8,522	Edward Paohawe Kaipuru	Independent	303	4.03	
Small Malaita	8,522	Martin Baddeley Housanau	People's Progressive Party	226	3.00	
Small Malaita	8,522	Barnabas Saru	Independent	11	0.15	
Small Malaita	8,522	Stanley Matthew Puairana	Independent	11	0.15	
Small Malaita	8,522	Hudson Ilala	Independent	6	0.08	
Small Malaita	8,522	Robert Donyhill Hite	Independent	2	0.03	
Small Malaita	8,522	Rejected votes		18	0.24	
South Choiseul	5,346	Elizah Doro Muala	Independent	896	20.28	Re-elected
South Choiseul	5,346	Baoro Laxton Koraua	Independent	663	15.00	
South Choiseul	5,346	Robertson Erere Galokale	Independent	603	13.65	
South Choiseul	5,346	Jackson Kiloe	Independent	562	12.72	
South Choiseul	5,346	David Deva	Independent	430	9.73	
South Choiseul	5,346	Cromwell Qopoto	Independent	244	5.52	
South Choiseul	5,346	Jimmy Qoloni Kereseka	National Transformation Party	199	4.50	
South Choiseul	5,346	Cherry Karoso Galokepoto	Independent	168	3.80	
South Choiseul	5,346	Alick Sogati	Independent	135	3.05	
South Choiseul	5,346	Mark Kale	Independent	132	2.99	
South Choiseul	5,346	Noah Zala	Independent	114	2.58	
South Choiseul	5,346	Gavin Taniveke	Independent	68	1.54	
South Choiseul	5,346	Johnson Pitavoqa Sokeni	Independent	54	1.22	
South Choiseul	5,346	Solomon Vaji Pita	Independent	47	1.06	
South Choiseul	5,346	Benjamin Kere	Independent	43	0.97	
South Choiseul	5,346	Nixson Qurusu	Independent	17	0.38	
South Choiseul	5,346	Gerby Taniveke Kalavasiri	Independent	15	0.34	
South Choiseul	5,346	Collish Leketo Tutua	Independent	12	0.27	
South Choiseul	5,346	Rejected votes		17	0.38	
South Guadalcanal	5,073	David Day Pacha	Independent	1,689	35.28	Re-elected
South Guadalcanal	5,073	John Stewart	Independent	986	20.59	
South Guadalcanal	5,073	Andrew Donua Muaki	United Democratic Party	737	15.39	
South Guadalcanal	5,073	Silas Crowford Atu	Solomon Islands Party for Rural Advancement	715	14.93	
South Guadalcanal	5,073	Victoria Onika	Independent	336	7.02	
South Guadalcanal	5,073	Desmond Sese	Kadere Party	233	4.87	
South Guadalcanal	5,073	Timothy Ngele	People First Party	59	1.23	
South Guadalcanal	5,073	Francis Peter Para	Independent	16	0.33	
South Guadalcanal	5,073	Edison Saeni	Pan Melanesian Congress Party	4	0.08	
South Guadalcanal	5,073	Rejected votes		13	0.27	
South New Georgia/Rendova/Tetepari	4,650	Danny Philip	United Democratic Party	2,104	50.88	Re-elected
South New Georgia/Rendova/Tetepari	4,650	Francis John Zama	Youth Owned Rural and Urban Party	1,209	29.24	
South New Georgia/Rendova/Tetepari	4,650	David Lani Gina	Independent	352	8.51	
South New Georgia/Rendova/Tetepari	4,650	George Solingi Lilo Bubele	Independent	271	6.55	
South New Georgia/Rendova/Tetepari	4,650	Osborn Vangana	Independent	136	3.29	
South New Georgia/Rendova/Tetepari	4,650	Joan Bessie Maega'asia	People's Alliance Party	47	1.14	
South New Georgia/Rendova/Tetepari	4,650	Rejected votes		16	0.39	
South Vella Lavella	4,995	Lional Alex	Independent	2,652	56.90	Re-elected
South Vella Lavella	4,995	Rence Sore	National Transformation Party	1,850	39.69	
South Vella Lavella	4,995	Christian Mesepitu	United Democratic Party	148	3.18	
South Vella Lavella	4,995	Rejected votes		11	0.24	
Temotu Nende	5,981	Commins Aston Mewa	Independent	2,118	40.24	Re-elected
Temotu Nende	5,981	Simon Peter Melau	National Transformation Party	684	12.99	
Temotu Nende	5,981	Walter Kola	Independent	625	11.87	
Temotu Nende	5,981	Philip Mali	United Democratic Party	476	9.04	
Temotu Nende	5,981	Charles Brown Beu	Pan Melanesian Congress Party	412	7.83	
Temotu Nende	5,981	John Roger Mekaboti	Independent	393	7.47	
Temotu Nende	5,981	James Meplana	People's Alliance Party	373	7.09	
Temotu Nende	5,981	Lionel Comins Menimer	Independent	133	2.53	
Temotu Nende	5,981	Casper Tuplo Negayebeye	Independent	32	0.61	
Temotu Nende	5,981	Rejected votes		18	0.34	
Temotu Pele	3,788	Duddley Kopu	Independent	607	18.65	Elected
Temotu Pele	3,788	Alfred Apela Toaki	Independent	601	18.47	
Temotu Pele	3,788	Christian Nubra Nieng	United Democratic Party	266	8.17	
Temotu Pele	3,788	Drummond Tupe Vaea	Independent	266	8.17	
Temotu Pele	3,788	James Ernest Bonunga	Independent	195	5.99	
Temotu Pele	3,788	Peter Tolua Mateala	Independent	174	5.35	
Temotu Pele	3,788	Alec Leubwa Bonunga	National Transformation Party	169	5.19	
Temotu Pele	3,788	Thompson Numomalo	Independent	147	4.52	
Temotu Pele	3,788	Mathew Matoko	Independent	132	4.06	
Temotu Pele	3,788	Andrew Menaisi	Youth Owned Rural and Urban Party	98	3.01	
Temotu Pele	3,788	Druman Obulou	Independent	87	2.67	
Temotu Pele	3,788	Johnson Levela	Solomon Islands Party for Rural Advancement	86	2.64	
Temotu Pele	3,788	Brian Magga	Independent	76	2.34	
Temotu Pele	3,788	Nelson Nimelea	Pan Melanesian Congress Party	72	2.21	
Temotu Pele	3,788	David Dauwa'abo Palapu	Independent	62	1.91	
Temotu Pele	3,788	Joe Atkin Leiau	Independent	62	1.91	
Temotu Pele	3,788	John Allan Cruz	Independent	31	0.95	
Temotu Pele	3,788	Lawrence Takyma Nodua	Independent	27	0.83	
Temotu Pele	3,788	Nelly Mabulou	People First Party	26	0.80	
Temotu Pele	3,788	Lonsdale Domo	Independent	24	0.74	
Temotu Pele	3,788	Bonie Jasper Maike	People's Alliance Party	22	0.68	
Temotu Pele	3,788	Patrick Teikamatta	Kadere Party of Solomon Islands	6	0.18	
Temotu Pele	3,788	Gilbert Atisa Mweela	People's Progressive Party	5	0.15	
Temotu Pele	3,788	Rejected votes		13	0.40	
Temotu Vatud	2,993	Freda Ab Tuki Soria Comua	People's Alliance Party	681	25.76	Elected
Temotu Vatud	2,993	Clay Forau Soalaoi	National Transformation Party	659	24.92	Unseated
Temotu Vatud	2,993	Walter Mavaemua	Independent	589	22.28	
Temotu Vatud	2,993	Noel Aisa	Independent	414	15.66	
Temotu Vatud	2,993	Chriss Patty	Independent	243	9.19	
Temotu Vatud	2,993	Michael Tufunga Fonotonu	People First Party	47	1.78	
Temotu Vatud	2,993	Rejected votes		11	0.42	
Ulawa/Ugi	3,753	Willie Braford Marau	People's Alliance Party	1,981	59.22	Elected
Ulawa/Ugi	3,753	James Tora	United Democratic Party	903	27.00	Unseated
Ulawa/Ugi	3,753	Frederick Isom Rohorua	Kadere Party	447	13.36	
Ulawa/Ugi	3,753	Rejected votes		14	0.42	
West ꞌAreꞌare	4,931	John Maneniaru	Independent	2,455	53.40	Re-elected
West ꞌAreꞌare	4,931	Alice A. Pollard	Independent	800	17.40	
West ꞌAreꞌare	4,931	Severino Nuaiasi	Democratic Alliance Party	525	11.42	
West ꞌAreꞌare	4,931	Johnson Aira'u Haneunutarau	United Democratic Party	438	9.53	
West ꞌAreꞌare	4,931	Peter Hauia	Independent	146	3.18	
West ꞌAreꞌare	4,931	Campion Ohasio	People First Party	101	2.20	
West ꞌAreꞌare	4,931	Rejected votes		132	2.87	
West Guadalcanal	5,121	Moses Garu	Democratic Alliance Party	1,885	38.45	Re-elected
West Guadalcanal	5,121	Anthony Kamu Veke	Independent	1,548	31.57	
West Guadalcanal	5,121	Laurie Chan	United Democratic Party	468	9.55	
West Guadalcanal	5,121	George Pukukesa	Independent	444	9.06	
West Guadalcanal	5,121	Francis Barney Paulsen	Independent	134	2.73	
West Guadalcanal	5,121	Titus Sura	People's Alliance Party	105	2.14	
West Guadalcanal	5,121	William Barile	Independent	95	1.94	
West Guadalcanal	5,121	Pascal Belamataga	People First Party	59	1.20	
West Guadalcanal	5,121	Lawrence Matexley	Pan Melanesian Congress Party	56	1.14	
West Guadalcanal	5,121	Martin Tolule	Independent	34	0.69	
West Guadalcanal	5,121	Stella Morgan Kokopu	Independent	23	0.47	
West Guadalcanal	5,121	Samson Habu	National Transformation Party	12	0.24	
West Guadalcanal	5,121	Rejected votes		40	0.82	
West Honiara	5,735	Namson Tran	Independent	3,793	74.40	Re-elected
West Honiara	5,735	Julie Gegeu Haro	People First Party	345	6.77	
West Honiara	5,735	Isaac Inoke Tosika	United Democratic Party	319	6.26	
West Honiara	5,735	Moffat Konofilia	Independent	318	6.24	
West Honiara	5,735	James Apaniai	National Transformation Party	238	4.67	
West Honiara	5,735	Nathan Ratu Nukufetau	People's Alliance Party	30	0.59	
West Honiara	5,735	Moses Dala Foanaota	Independent	19	0.37	
West Honiara	5,735	Rejected votes		36	0.71	
West Kwaio	5,449	Peter Tom	Democratic Alliance Party	1,791	35.39	Re-elected
West Kwaio	5,449	Titus Fika	Independent	1,507	29.78	
West Kwaio	5,449	Nixon Ledea	Independent	381	7.53	
West Kwaio	5,449	Joseph Primo Baetolingia	Independent	286	5.65	
West Kwaio	5,449	Luma Darcy	Pan Melanesian Congress Party	275	5.43	
West Kwaio	5,449	George Luialamo	Independent	222	4.39	
West Kwaio	5,449	John Jnr Fera	Independent	124	2.45	
West Kwaio	5,449	Samson Bade	People's Alliance Party	115	2.27	
West Kwaio	5,449	Jackson Gege	United Democratic Party	107	2.11	
West Kwaio	5,449	Harry Kwalafunu	Independent	106	2.09	
West Kwaio	5,449	Stanley Siko	Independent	88	1.74	
West Kwaio	5,449	Hillary Wemani Fuiadi	Independent	24	0.47	
West Kwaio	5,449	Philip Sufiona	Independent	18	0.36	
West Kwaio	5,449	Rejected votes		17	0.34	
West Kwara'ae	8,189	Sam Shemuel Iduri	Democratic Alliance Party	1,479	19.30	Re-elected
West Kwara'ae	8,189	Clement Koba’a Oikali	Kadere Party	1,405	18.33	
West Kwara'ae	8,189	Sipriano Rifalea	Independent	1,292	16.86	
West Kwara'ae	8,189	Ding Wen Zheng	Independent	1,127	14.70	
West Kwara'ae	8,189	Johnson Tua	Independent	630	8.22	
West Kwara'ae	8,189	David B Lidimani	United Democratic Party	601	7.84	
West Kwara'ae	8,189	Eric Ryan Ulufia	Independent	501	6.54	
West Kwara'ae	8,189	Placid Babanimae	Independent	168	2.19	
West Kwara'ae	8,189	Elton Kenasi	National Transformation Party	156	2.04	
West Kwara'ae	8,189	Francis Asilaua	New Nation Party	124	1.62	
West Kwara'ae	8,189	Joseph Iniga	People First Party	93	1.21	
West Kwara'ae	8,189	William Gua	Independent	19	0.25	
West Kwara'ae	8,189	James Lee Ringomea	Independent	18	0.23	
West Kwara'ae	8,189	Jason Wale Alairamo	Independent	8	0.10	
West Kwara'ae	8,189	Margaret Rose Maelaua	People's Alliance Party	4	0.05	
West Kwara'ae	8,189	Rex Henry Rafemae	Independent	2	0.03	
West Kwara'ae	8,189	Rejected votes		38	0.50	
West Makira	5,787	Derick Rawcliff Manu'ari	People First Party	1,749	33.60	Elected
West Makira	5,787	Matthew Ha'asuramo Taro	People's Alliance Party	1,130	21.71	
West Makira	5,787	Jackson Sunaone	United Democratic Party	1,005	19.30	
West Makira	5,787	Dick Ha'amori	Direct Development Party	703	13.50	Unseated
West Makira	5,787	Donald Orisau	Independent	313	6.01	
West Makira	5,787	Daniel Dautaha	Independent	137	2.63	
West Makira	5,787	Nelson Nausi	Independent	58	1.11	
West Makira	5,787	Taukerei Peter Odo	Independent	37	0.71	
West Makira	5,787	Lawrence Dangi	Independent	35	0.67	
West Makira	5,787	John Aurua Ta'aru	Independent	22	0.42	
West Makira	5,787	Rejected votes		17	0.33	
West New Georgia/Vona Vona	7,940	Silas Kerry Vaqara Tausinga	Solomon Islands Party for Rural Advancement	2,150	32.28	Re-elected
West New Georgia/Vona Vona	7,940	Billy Veo	Independent	1,904	28.58	
West New Georgia/Vona Vona	7,940	Peter James Boyers	Kadere Party	736	11.05	
West New Georgia/Vona Vona	7,940	Peter Umea	United Democratic Party	638	9.58	
West New Georgia/Vona Vona	7,940	George Temahua	Independent	525	7.88	
West New Georgia/Vona Vona	7,940	Wilfred Luiramo	National Transformation Party	266	3.99	
West New Georgia/Vona Vona	7,940	Warren Paia	People's Alliance Party	198	2.97	
West New Georgia/Vona Vona	7,940	Silas Rodie	Independent	124	1.86	
West New Georgia/Vona Vona	7,940	Malloney Lopoto	Independent	68	1.02	
West New Georgia/Vona Vona	7,940	Alfred Kaehuna	Independent	32	0.48	
West New Georgia/Vona Vona	7,940	Rejected votes		20	0.30	

== Aftermath ==
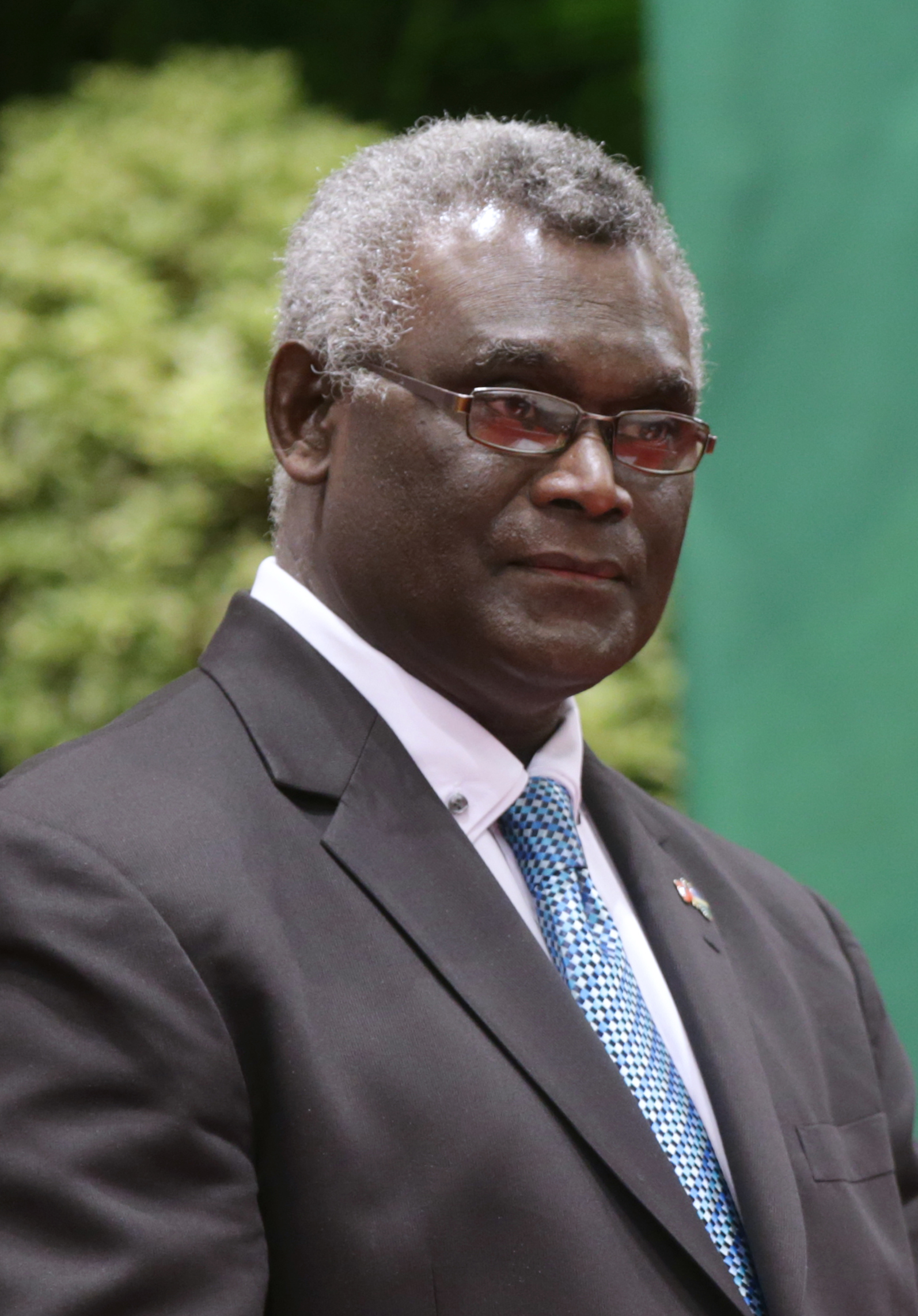
Manasseh Sogavare was elected to a third non-consecutive term as prime minister

With no dominant party, negotiations to form a government commenced after the election. Two blocs emerged to compete to take the reins of government. The Democratic Coalition for Change bloc (DCC) comprised the Kadere Party, the UDP and some independents. The DCC nominated Manasseh Sogavare as the bloc's prime ministerial nominee. Sogavare had served as prime minister from 2000 to 2001 and again from 2006 to 2007, when he lost a no-confidence motion. The Solomon Islands People's Democratic Coalition (SIPDC) nominated first-term MP Jeremiah Manele. The SIPDC comprised the Democratic Alliance, the People's Alliance Party, the People First Party and outgoing Prime Minister Lilo's SIPRA. On 2 December, Governor-General Kabui announced that the parliamentary vote for prime minister would be held on 9 December. Prime ministerial elections in Solomon Islands are often unpredictable, as MPs are not legally barred from switching parties. The Solomon Islands Royal Police Force increased security in Honiara and the rest of Guadalcanal in the lead-up to the vote. In the prime ministerial ballot, Sogavare won a third non-consecutive term, receiving 31 votes, while Manele received 19. The first session of the 10th Parliament occurred on 17 December. Parliament elected former Rennell and Bellona Premier Ajilon Jasper Nasiu as speaker that day. He received 27 votes, defeating former Parliamentary Clerk Taeasi Sanga, who received 23. John Moffat Fugui was elected deputy speaker. Manele became leader of the opposition.

In October 2017, nine cabinet ministers, including Deputy Prime Minister Manasseh Maelanga, and several backbenchers defected from the governing coalition. The group claimed Sogavare had ceased consulting cabinet ministers on policy issues and that he was listening more to "outsiders". The defectors also claimed the coalition had strayed from its initial goals and expressed concern about Sogavare's chief of staff and nephew, Robson Djokovic's alleged undue influence. Sogavare lost a no-confidence motion on 6 November, with 27 MPs voting for and 23 against. Sogavare claimed supporters of the motion were motivated by "deliberate lies" and that he was being removed for standing up "against corruption and corrupt leaders". On 16 November, parliament elected Rick Houenipwela as prime minister, defeating John Moffat Fugui.
