= Rick Houenipwela =

Solomon Islands politician (born 1958)

The Right Honourable Rick Houenipwela MP
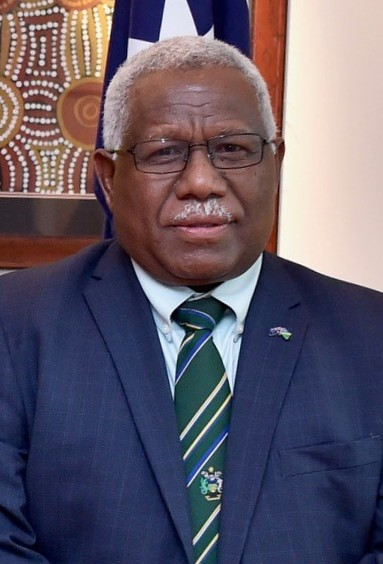
- Houenipwela in 2018

Minister of Foreign Affairs
- Incumbent
- Assumed office 17 May 2026
- Monarch: Charles III
- Governor General: David Tiva Kapu
- Preceded by: Peter Shannel Agovaka; Jeremiah Manele (acting)

Prime Minister of Solomon Islands
- In office 15 November 2017 – 24 April 2019
- Monarch: Elizabeth II
- Governor General: Frank Kabui
- Preceded by: Manasseh Sogavare
- Succeeded by: Manasseh Sogavare

Minister of Finance of the Solomon Islands
- In office 21 November 2011 – 8 September 2014
- Prime Minister: Gordon Darcy Lilo
- Preceded by: Gordon Darcy Lilo
- Succeeded by: Snyder Rini

Minister for Public Service
- In office 18 April 2011 – 10 November 2011
- Prime Minister: Danny Philip
- Preceded by: Stanley Sofu
- Succeeded by: Alfred Ghiro

Member of Parliament for Small Malaita
- Incumbent
- Assumed office 4 August 2010
- Preceded by: William Nii Haomae

Governor of the Central Bank of Solomon Islands
- In office 1993–2008
- Preceded by: Anthony V. Hughes
- Succeeded by: Denton Rarawa

Personal details
- Born: 8 August 1958 (age 67)
- Party: Democratic Alliance Party

Rick Houenipwela (born 8 August 1958), more commonly known as Rick Hou, is a Solomon Islander politician who served as the prime minister of Solomon Islands from 15 November 2017 to 24 April 2019. He has served as minister of foreign affairs since 17 May 2026.

He has a Bachelor's degree in commerce and accounting from the Papua New Guinea University of Technology and served as the governor of the Central Bank of Solomon Islands from 1993 to 2008, before becoming Senior Advisor to the Executive Director of the World Bank, and then going into politics. The Solomon Times described him as "one of the key public figures in the Solomon Islands whose credibility is intact, if not enhanced, after resisting corruption and several attempts by fraudsters to bankrupt the nation during the ethnic conflict" of the early 2000s.

The magazine Islands Business named him "Man of the Year" for the Pacific region in 2003, at a time when he was Governor of the Central Bank. ABC Radio's Sean Dorney described him in 2011 as a critic of excessive exploitation of the country's forests, a modest man who had shown "strength [...] over the years in standing up to those who have exploited the country. He took a courageous stand in defending the Central Bank from extortion in the face of considerable intimidation from those with the guns during the worst of the ethnic tensions".

His career in national politics began when he was elected to Parliament as the member for Small Malaita in the August 2010 general election, standing as a member of the Democratic Party. Party leader Steve Abana became Leader of the Opposition, and appointed Houenipwela Shadow Minister for Finance and the Treasury. In early April 2011, having been ousted from the leadership of the Opposition, Abana defected to Prime Minister Danny Philip's government, bringing with him several members of the Opposition, including Houenipwela. The latter was appointed Minister for Public Service.

In early November 2011, several ministers joined or rejoined the Opposition, ultimately bringing down the government. On November 9, three ministers returned to the Opposition. The following day, Rick Hou joined them. On the day after that, Prime Minister Danny Philip sacked Finance Minister Gordon Darcy Lilo, reportedly for conspiring with the Opposition. Hours later, Philip announced his own resignation, as he clearly no longer had the numbers with which to govern. On November 16, Parliament chose Lilo to replace him. Lilo appointed Hou as his Minister of Finance of the Solomon Islands. Upon his appointment, Houenipwela told the Solomon Star he would seek to exempt "low paid workers" from paying tax, while also "lower[ing] the tax rates to enable companies to be profitable". There would be increased government support and investment in "productive sectors", including agriculture, tourism and fisheries.

In April 2015, he took a stand in Parliament against members of Parliament being exempted from paying income tax. He stated that he would refuse his own tax exemption.

Political offices
Preceded by Manasseh Sogavare	Prime Minister of the Solomon Islands; 2017–2019	Succeeded by Manasseh Sogavare
