= Guardian-class patrol boat =

Class of patrol vessels built by Australia for Pacific nations

Guardian class
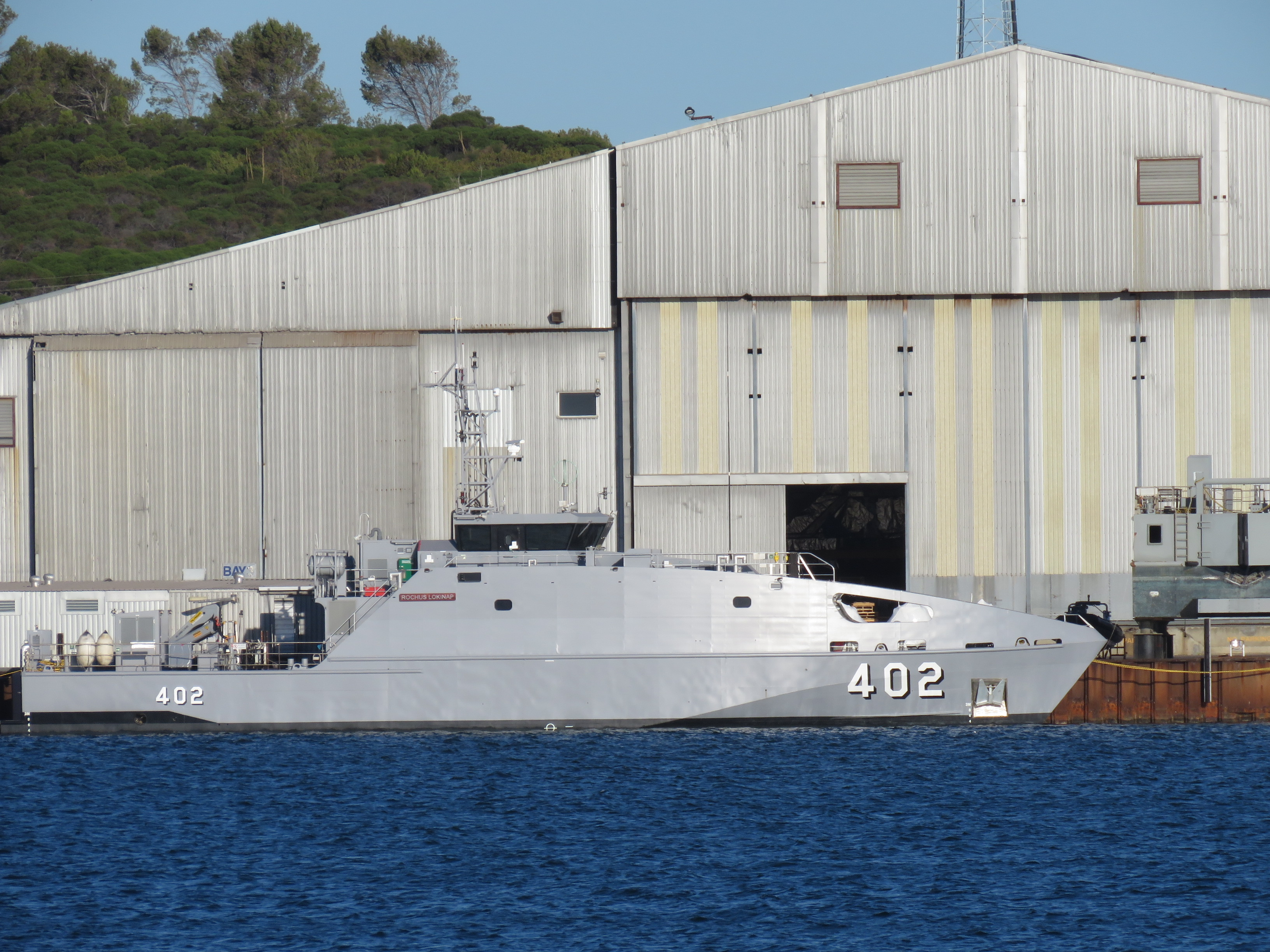
- HMPNGS Rochus Lokinap in Henderson, Western Australia

General characteristics
- Type: Patrol boat
- Length: 39.5 m (129 ft 7 in)
- Beam: 8 m (26 ft 3 in)
- Draft: 2.5 m (8 ft 2 in)
- Propulsion: 2 × Caterpillar 3516C diesels, 2 shafts
- Speed: 20 knots (37 km/h; 23 mph)
- Range: 3,000 nautical miles (5,600 km; 3,500 mi) at 12 knots (22 km/h; 14 mph)
- Complement: 23
- Armament: Australia shipped the vessels complete, except for weapons.; 12.7 mm (0.50 in) machine guns (Solomon Islands)

Class overview
- Name: Guardian class
- Builders: Austal
- Operators: Papua New Guinea (Military); Tuvalu (Police); Tonga (Military); Samoa (Police); Solomon Islands (Police); Fiji (Navy); Palau (Police); Kiribati (Police); Vanuatu (Police); Republic of Marshall Islands; Federated States of Micronesia (Police); Cook Islands (Police); Timor Leste (Military); Maldives (MNDF Coast Guard)
- Preceded by: Pacific class
- Cost: 30 million Samoan tālā (which was A$15.88 million on 2021-08-05)
- Built: 2018–present
- Planned: 24
- Active: 12 (30 October 2026)
- Laid up: 1
- Lost: 2
- Preserved: 1 (Norship Cairns Training Vessel)

The Guardian-class patrol boats are a class of small patrol vessels designed and built in Australia and provided to small South Pacific Ocean countries as part of the Australian Government's Pacific Maritime Security Program.

The class is designed to be updated replacements for the Pacific Forum-class patrol boats provided to its allies from 1987 to 1997. Australia provided twenty-two Pacific Forum vessels to twelve nations. They were designed to use commercial off the shelf components, to make them easier to maintain for the small nations that would operate them. Australia stood ready to help with training and maintenance, during the duration of the program, because Australia's external security issues were eased if it could count on its sovereign neighbours having resources to police their own external security.

Austal was commissioned to build 19 Guardian-class boats in 2016. Austal's contract allows it to market the design to additional customers. Subsequently, an additional three vessels were ordered. Two for Timor-Leste, and one new replacement vessel for the Samoan Nafanua II, which was damaged beyond repair on 5 August 2021. The last vessels were scheduled for delivery in late 2023, but the number of planned boats had risen to 24 by late 2024.

== Background ==
Following a 1979 Australian and New Zealand assessment of Pacific Islands maritime patrol needs and the 1982 United Nations Convention on the Law of the Sea establishing that all maritime nations were entitled to exercise control over a 200-kilometre (120 mi) exclusive economic zone, it became evident to all parties that the Pacific Islands were in need of several patrol vessels. The Australian Government decided to meet this need by launching the Pacific Patrol Boat Program, in which Australia would gift 22 Pacific Forum-class patrol boat to 12 allied Pacific Island nations between 1987 and 1997. In addition to simply improving diplomatic relations between the countries, Australia benefited by having their external security issues eased as it could count on its sovereign neighbours having resources to police their own waters.

The Pacific Forum vessels were designed to use commercial off the shelf components, to make them easier to maintain for the small nations that would operate them. Though, if needed, Australia stood ready to help with training and maintenance during the duration of the original program. This included refits after fifteen years of operation, which extended the projected service life of the last vessels to 2027.

The Australian government launched the A$2 billion Pacific Patrol Boat Replacement Program in June 2014.

There has been political disagreement within Australia as to whether it was sensible for Australia to fund the Pacific class.

== Roles ==
Like the class of vessels they will replace, these small vessels will allow Australia's small neighbours to patrol their own economic zones. They will be able to control smuggling, unregulated fishing, and perform search and rescue duties. A Royal Australian Navy rear admiral said upon the delivery of Taro to the Solomon Islands that the Guardian class "play an important role in tackling our shared regional security challenges [...] We are better positioned to respond to maritime threats, from illegal fishing to transnational crime, by working together, co-ordinating closely, and building our interoperability."

The Guardian class will be slightly larger, will have better sea-keeping capabilities, and their electronics suite will be up to date.

== Design ==
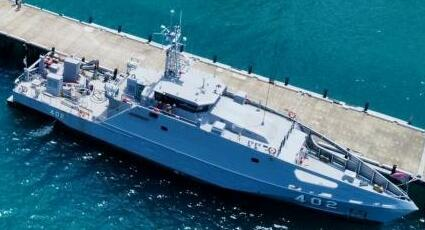
Aerial view of HMPNGS Rochus Lokinap moored at Manus, Papua New Guinea, on 14 August 2022

The Australian government called for submission in March 2015. Five consortia submitted designs for the class. Austal was chosen as the contractor in April 2016.

=== Main design ===
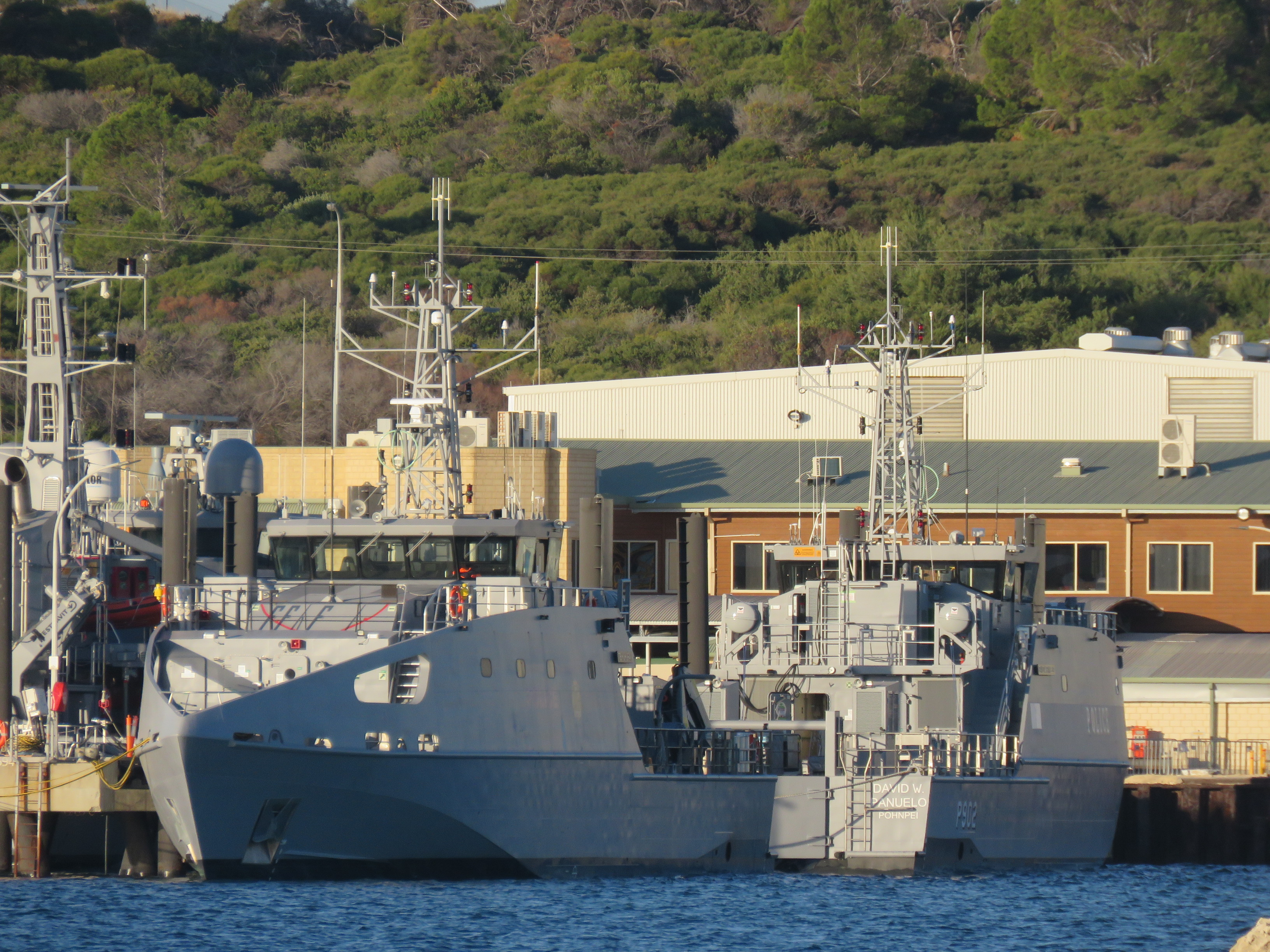
CIPPB Te Kukupa II (left) and FSS David W. Panuelo moored with sterns facing each other at Austal shipyards in Henderson, Western Australia in May 2022

The vessels are a 39.5 metres (129 ft 7 in) long, steel monohull design, capable of traveling 3,000 nautical miles (5,600 km; 3,500 mi) at 12 knots (22 km/h; 14 mph), with a maximum speed of 20 knots (37 km/h; 23 mph). They are designed to berth a complement of 23 crew members. They have a stern launching ramp for a pursuit boat, also improving search and rescue capabilities. Austal delivered the vessels without armament, but they are designed to be capable of mounting an autocannon of up to 30 mm (1.2 in) on their foredeck, and a heavy machine gun on either side of their bridge.

The vessel's twin diesel engines provide 4,000 kilowatts (5,400 shp). Sophisticated electronic engine controls will help conserve fuel.

One of the main deck staterooms, a stateroom with two bunks, is equipped with separate ventilation, so it can be used as an infirmary for infectious patients.

The patrol boats operated by Papua New Guinea and Solomons Islands will be armed with 12.7 mm (0.50 in) machine guns. Timor Leste has requested that their boats be armed.

During INDO PACIFIC 2022 Austal revealed an up-armed variant of the Guardian dubbed the 40-A with a 20 mm (0.79 in) main gun, two 12.7 mm machine guns and a 20 mm remote weapon system aft.

=== Design defects ===
Several design flaws have been identified in finished vessels. The flaws were reported publicly in June 2022, after fifteen vessels had been delivered.

Recipient nations were notified in February 2021 of a vessel experiencing cracking in the coupling between the engine and the gear box. Two separate air quality faults were also discovered in May 2022. The medical bay ventilation system reportedly uses recirculated air, when fresh air is advised. It was also reported that a fault in the exhaust system caused carbon monoxide to enter a normally uncrewed compartment, posing a safety risk.

Austal has reportedly "accepted that the problems are latent defects that it will work to resolve."

== Orders and delivery ==
Austal was commissioned to build 19 Guardian-class boats in 2016. This was fewer than the 22 Pacific-class patrol boats Australia ordered for the same recipients back in the 1980s. The Federated States of Micronesia, Fiji and Tonga, who had operated three Pacific-class boats each from the original program, were to be gifted two Guardian-class patrol boats each as replacements. While the patrol boats are gifts and become the recipient's sovereign property upon delivery, the purchase contract contains provisions for Austal to provide maintenance support to the client states, for seven years, out of its Cairns facility.

The keel of the first vessel was laid in July 2017. That vessel was scheduled to be delivered to Papua New Guinea in October 2018. New vessels were scheduled to be completed every three months. The first vessel was delivered on 30 November 2018, and commissioned into the Papua New Guinea Defence Force (PNGDF) on 1 February 2019. The second was commissioned into the Tuvalu Police Force on 5 April 2019. The fourth vessel was delivered to Samoa on 16 August 2019.

Australia announced on 19 April 2018 that they ordered two more vessels to gift them to Timor-Leste. They did this by exercising a pre-negotiated option in the original contract, at an additional cost of A$29.7 million. Timor-Leste did not receive Pacific Forum boats in the original program.

Austal delivered HMPNGS Ted Diro to the Papua New Guinea Defence Force on 30 November 2018. Her engines broke down in October 2019, and she had to be towed to Australia for repairs.

In June 2021, the Australian Defence Force agreed to the PNGDF's request to arm their four patrol boats. Two boats had been delivered to Papua New Guinea at the time. It is unclear which armaments will be installed and who will install them on behalf of the ADF.

During a visit to Apia in June 2022, Foreign Minister Penny Wong announced that Australia will build an additional vessel to replace Nafanua II, which was damaged beyond repair on 5 August 2021.

22 vessels were delivered between 2018 and December 2024.

In June 2025, the Australian Minister for Defence Richard Marles announced that Australia will provide one Guardian-class to the Maldives.

== Operational history and incidents ==
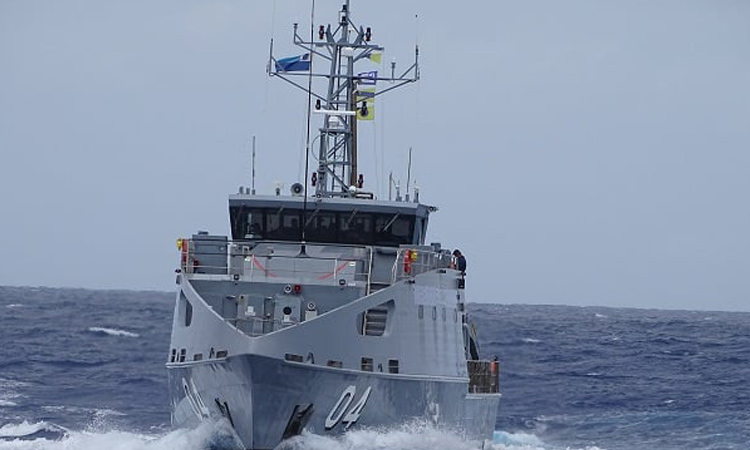
Nafanua II at sea in November 2020. She ran aground on 5 August 2021, suffering irreparable damage.

In October 2019, HMPNGS Ted Diro's engines broke down, and she had to be towed to Australia for repairs.

In the winter of 2020–2021, an unidentified vessel experienced cracking in the coupling between the engine and the gear box.

On 5 August 2021, the Samoan Nafanua II ran aground on a reef near Salelologa wharf while transporting police officers to Savai'i to manage a protest. Australian specialists loaded her onto a barge and transported her to Cairns for assessment. She was found to be beyond economical repair, and given back to Australia for disposal. On 21 December 2021 the officer-in-charge of the boat at the time of the accident, Superintendent Taito Sefo Faaoi Hunt, was found guilty on three charges of negligence by a Police disciplinary tribunal. On 4 January he was fined $2000 Samoan tālā and demoted from superintendent to corporal.

In mid-May 2022, an unidentified vessel experienced a carbon monoxide exhaust leak into a normally uncrewed compartment.

In March 2023, Vanuatu's Takuare and Tuvalu's Te Mataili II were damaged when two cyclones hit Vanuatu. While Takuare was being repaired in Cairns, Tuvalu was scheduled to receive a replacement boat for Te Mataili II.

On 4 September 2025, four Guardian-class patrol vessels, including HMPNGS Gilbert Toropo (P536), HMPNGS Ted Diro (P401), HMPNGS Rochus Lokinap (P402) and VOEA Ngahau Koula (P301) participated in the mobile Fleet Review at the 50th Independence Day of Papua New Guinea. The Review was held at the Port Moresby harbour and was conducted and led by INS Kadmatt (P29) of the Indian Navy. A total of seven warships from five nations took part in the Review formation, with the other ships being FNS Auguste Benebig and HMAS Childers (ACPB 93).

== List of boats in class ==
Disposition of Guardian-class boats
Name	Recipient	Hull number	Predecessor (Pacific-class)	Delivery	Commissioning	Retirement	Notes
HMPNGS Ted Diro	Papua New Guinea (Defense Force)	521	HMPNGS Rabaul	2018-11-30	2019-02-01		Hers was the first keel laid, on 30 July 2017. She was launched on 30 May 2018.; Jane's Defence Weekly reports she began her official sea trials on 9 August 2018.; Named after Papua New Guinea's first commander of the Papua New-Guinea Defence Force.
HMTSS Te Mataili II	Tuvalu (Police Force)	522	HMTSS Te Mataili	2019-04-05	2019	Feb 2023 Hull disposed of 2026	Launched on 26 November 2018, scheduled to be commissioned in April 2019.
VOEA Ngahau Koula	Tonga (Maritime Force) (HMAF)	523	VOEA Savea	2019-06-24	2019-10-16		The vessel's crew may contain both men and women.; The vessel's name translates to "Golden Arrow".
Nafanua II	Samoa (Police Service)	524	Nafanua	2019-08-16	2019-10-16	2022-03-04 Vessel used for training with crew. Name: TBD	The vessel's crew may contain both men and women.; May mount a deck gun.; Written off in 2022 after running aground in August 2021.
RSIPV Gizo	Solomon Islands (Maritime Police)	525	RSIPV Lata	2019-11-08	2019-12-19		Solomon Islands will receive two vessels, with the other being named Taro.; Gizo is armed with FN Herstal M2 12.7 mm machine guns.
RFNS Savenaca	Fiji (Fijian Navy)	526	RFNS Kula	2020-03-06	2020-05-06		Fiji will receive two vessels in 2020.; Fiji's first Guardian-class vessel, was named in honour of Savenaca Naulutuma, who died while serving on Leander, during World War II.
PSS Remeliik II	Palau (Police) (Marine Law Enforement)	527	Remeliik	2020-09-18			Palau was gifted one vessel.
VOEA Ngahau Siliva	Tonga (Maritime Force) (HMAF)	528	VOEA Pangai; VOEA Neiafu	2020-10-30	2021-01-27		The handover was attended by High Commissioner Princess Angelika Latufuipeka Tuku'aho and Lieutenant Colonel Tevita Siu Fifita, representing Tonga, and Melissa Price the Minister for Defence Industry and Rear Admiral Wendy Malcolm, representing Australia.; King Tupou VI commissioned the vessel.; The name translates to "Silver Arrow".
HMPNGS Rochus Lokinap	Papua New Guinea (Defense Force)	529	HMPNGS Dreger	2021-03-17			Papua New Guinea will receive a total of four vessels.
RSIPV Taro	Solomon Islands (Maritime Police)	530	RSIPV Auki	2021-05-09			Solomon Islands will receive two vessels, with the other being named Gizo.; Taro's delivery was scheduled for May 2021, and this occurred on time.; Taro is armed with FN Herstal M2 12.7 mm machine guns.
RKS Teanoai II	Kiribati (Maritime Police)	531	RKS Teanoai	2021-06-21			Teanoai II was launched on 24 April 2020.
RVS Takuare	Vanuatu (Police Maritime Wing)	532	RVS Tukoro	2021-08-01		Vessel in storage pending direction from Australian government.	
HMPNGS Francis Agwi	Papua New Guinea (Defense Force)	533	HMPNGS Seeadler	2021-10-22			Papua New Guinea will receive a total of four vessels.
FSS Tosiwo Nakayama	Federated States of Micronesia (Police Mari- time Wing)	534	FSS Micronesia; FSS Independence	2022-03-11			Federated States of Micronesia will receive two vessels in 2022 and 2023
CIPPB Te Kukupa II	Cook Islands (Police Maritime Wing)	535	CIPPB Te Kukupa	2022-05-27			Launched in January 2022.
HMPNGS Gilbert Toropo	Papua New Guinea (Defense Force)	537	HMPNGS Moresby				Papua New Guinea will receive a total of four vessels.
RMIS Jelmae	Republic of the Marshall Islands	543	RMIS Lomor	30 January 2026			
FSS Bethwel Henry	Federated States of Micronesia (Police Mari- time Wing)	538	FSS Palikir	2022	Delivered Aug 2023		Federated States of Micronesia will receive two vessels.
RFNS Puamau	Fiji (Fijian Navy)	539	RFNS Kikau (RFNS Kiro)	2024-03-07		2024	Fiji is scheduled to receive its second vessel in 2023.
RFNS Timo	Fiji Defence	540		2024			Timor-Leste was scheduled to receive two vessels, but was unable to accept them because of the lack of port facilities. The Aitana was subsequently reassigned to Fiji as the RFNS Timo.
RKS Tobwaan Mainiku	Kiribati Police	541		2023	2024		Timor-Leste was scheduled to receive two vessels, but was unable to accept them because of the lack of port facilities. Was gifted to Kiribati instead
Nafanua III	Samoa (Police Service)	542	Nafanua II (2019) (Guardian class) which replaced Nafanua (1988) (Pacific class)	22 November 2023			Replacing Nafanua II
	Kiribati (Maritime Police)						
HMTSS Te Mataili III	Tuvalu (Police Force)						Launched 2024

== See also ==
- Defiant-class patrol vessel, the United States is providing 13 small patrol vessels to small Caribbean nations
- Pacific Islands Forum
- Forum Fisheries Agency
- Operation Kurukuru
