= List of countries and dependencies by number of police officers =

The following list compares the size of police forces and police per head. In 2006, an analysis by the United Nations indicates an approximate median of 300 police officers per 100,000 inhabitants. Only nine countries disclosed values lower than 100 officers per 100,000 inhabitants. The highest median of police officers – around 400 – was observed in West Asia, Eastern and Southern Europe. The median of police officers per population remained stable between 2002 and 2006, after an increase between 1995 and 2002.

Country or dependency	Active force	Rate (per 100k population)	Year
Algeria *	160,000	396	2009
Albania *	9,900	326	2013
American Samoa * (US)	200	350	2012
Andorra *	237	304	2012
Antigua and Barbuda *	600	695	2012
Argentina *	350,000	798	2015
Armenia *	13,500	456	2018
Australia *	65,000	264	2022
Austria *	29,900	335	2020
Bahamas	3,000	794	2012
Bangladesh *	210,000	127	2018
Barbados *	1,394	489	2013
Belarus *	30,970	331	2010
Belgium *	37,840	334	2017
Belize *	1,300	346	2012
Bermuda * (UK)	469	757	2012
Botswana *	8,500	381	2012
Brazil *	500,000	242	2014
Brunei *	4,400	1,068	2012
Bulgaria *	24,283	339	2015
Cambodia *	64,000	410	2012
Canada *	67,425	184	2017
Cayman Islands * (UK)	343	568	2012
Chile *	30,300	167	2012
China *	3,600,000	258	2018
Colombia *	150,000	307	2012
Comoros	500	62	2012
Cook Islands * (NZ)	100	552	2012
Costa Rica *	14,500	297	2012
Croatia *	20,004	514	2020
Cyprus * (Note: Excluding zones not under the control of the Republic of Cyprus.)	3,000	338	2020
Czech Republic *	40,152	378	2018
Denmark *	11,225	196	2020
Dominica *	506	710	2013
Dominican Republic *	32,000	318	2012
Ecuador *	40,000	241	2012
El Salvador *	21,900	336	2012
England and Wales * (UK)	135,301	227	2021
Estonia *	4,490	327	2024
Finland *	7,300	132	2020
Fiji *	1,970	227	2012
France *	282,612	422	2020
French Polynesia (France)	220	81	2012
Gambia *	5,000	266	2012
Ghana *	23,000	83	2012
Greece *	55,000	507	2018
Grenada *	900	871	2012
Germany *	289,900	349	2021
Guinea	10,000	77	2012
Haiti *	12,000	108	2012
Hong Kong * (China)	40,000	533	2020
Hungary *	36,104	367	2015
Iceland *	660	184	2021
India * (Note: It is the actual strength, not the sanctioned strength. The sanctioned police force is 2,755,274, which gives a ratio of 197.44 per 100,000 population. The figures include civil police and armed police personnel.)	2,162,000	155	2024
Indonesia *	436,432	158	2022
Iran *	215,000	250	2024
Ireland *	14,695	293	2022
Isle of Man * (UK)	236	279	2013
Israel *	24,000	289	2015
Italy *	276,750	456	2012
Jamaica *	8,600	316	2012
Japan *	322,000	255	2017
Jordan *	25,000	256	2012
Kenya *	95,000	204	2017
Kiribati *	458	404	2012
Kosovo *	9,000	460	2018
Kuwait *	18,000	430	2012
Latvia *	7,000	358	2012
Lesotho	2,404	125	2012
Liechtenstein * (Note: Does not include the Security Corps, an auxiliary force.)	131	329	2022
Liberia *	4,100	101	2012
Lithuania *	7,007	250	2021
Luxembourg *	1,812	307	2017
Macau * (China)	6,000	920	2012
North Macedonia *	11,688	564	2017
Malaysia *	102,000	321	2012
Mali *	7,000	38	2012
Malta *	1,902	443	2012
Marshall Islands *	130	237	2012
Mauritius *	12,475	987	2013
Mexico *	580,000	495	2012
Monaco *	500	1,302	2012
Montenegro *	3,296	529	2025
Montserrat (UK)	76	1,544	2012
Federated States of Micronesia *	500	486	2012
Myanmar *	93,000	170	2012
Nauru *	80	793	2012
Nepal *	79,538	272	2021
Netherlands *	50,400	295	2018
New Caledonia (France)	268	100	2012
New Zealand *	14,899	289	2022
Niger *	8,700	42	2012
Nigeria *	350,000	187	2012
Niue (NZ)	16	1,088	2012
Northern Ireland * (UK)	6,813	362	2015
Norway *	10,170	189	2019
Palau *	75	418	2012
Palestine	85,000	1,471	2005
Panama *	12,000	315	2012
Pakistan *	354,221	182	2011
Papua New Guinea *	5,311	65	2012
Peru *	104,000	330	2009
Philippines *	220,000	208	2019
Pitcairn Islands (UK)	2	3,509	2015
Poland *	100,000	259	2012
Portugal *	46,083	446	2012
Romania *	60,000	304	2014
Russia *	770,000	525	2016
Saint Barthélemy (France)	11	117	2012
Saint Helena, Ascension and Tristan da Cunha (Note: Does not include Tristan da Cunha.) (UK)	69	924	2012
Saint Kitts and Nevis *	450	974	2012
Saint Lucia *	947	509	2012
Saint Vincent and the Grenadines *	691	628	2012
San Marino * (Note: Includes the Civil Police (traffic), the Gendarmerie (criminal), and the Fortress Guard (customs).)	160	485	2012
Scotland * (UK)	17,296	318	2014
Sint Maarten (Netherlands)	370	967	2012
Samoa *	1,027	527	2023
Serbia *	45,000	636	2012
Singapore *	10,500	174	2025
Slovakia *	21,734	398	2019
Slovenia *	7,170	340	2017
Solomon Islands *	1,442	225	2012
Somalia *	5,532	43	2012
South Africa *	193,000	345	2019
South Korea *	130,000	251	2025
South Sudan *	52,000	429	2012
Sri Lanka *	89,000	424	2012
Spain *	249,907	534	2012
Eswatini *	4,164	368	2012
Sweden *	20,423	198	2019
Switzerland *	17,630	211	2012
Taiwan *	64,816	273	2019
Thailand *	230,000	338	2012
Turkey *	484,000	615	2012
Tonga *	418	414	2012
Togo *	4,000	56	2012
Trinidad and Tobago *	6,500	482	2012
Tunisia	15,000	131	2017
Tuvalu *	72	677	2012
Ukraine *	152,000	356	2014
United States *	697,195	242	2019
Uruguay *	30,000	862	2015
Vanuatu * (Note: Includes both the Vanuatu Police Force, and the paramilitary wing, the Vanuatu Mobile Force.)	575	207	2012
Vatican City *	130	15,439	2012
Wallis and Futuna (France)	20	170	2012
Zimbabwe *	50,000	351	2007
Gibraltar (UK)	280	856	2022
British Virgin Islands (UK)	253	796	2018
