= Military ranks of Vanuatu =

The military ranks of Vanuatu are the military insignia used by the Vanuatu Police Force and Vanuatu Mobile Force.

== Commissioned officer ranks ==
The rank insignia of commissioned officers.

Rank group	General / flag officers			Senior officers			Junior officers
Vanuatu Police Force
Vanuatu Police Force	Commissioner; Komisna	Deputy commissioner Nambatu Komisna	Assistant commissioner			Superintendent	Chief inspector Jif Inspekta	Senior inspector Long Inspekta	Inspector; Inspekta
Vanuatu Mobile Forces
Vanuatu Mobile Forces		Major general Bigfala Jenerol	Brigadier	Colonel; Kolonel	Lieutenant colonel Lietnen Kolonel	Major; Bigfala	Captain; Kapten	First lieutenant Fas Lietnen	Second lieutenant Seken Lietnen
Vanuatu Maritime Wing
Vanuatu Maritime Wing					Commander; Komanda	Lieutenant commander Lietnen Komanda	Lieutenant; Lietnen	Sub lieutenant Sab-Lietnen

== Other ranks ==
The rank insignia of non-commissioned officers and enlisted personnel.

Rank group	Senior NCOs				Junior NCOs		Enlisted
Vanuatu Police Force
Vanuatu Police Force			Senior sergeant Long Sajen	Sergeant; Sajen	Corporal; Kofol		Constable; Polis	Recruit; Rikrut
Vanuatu Mobile Forces
Vanuatu Mobile Forces	Warrant Officer; Class 1	Warrant Officer; Class 2	Staff Sergeant; Staf Sajen	Sergeant; Sajen	Corporal; Kofol	Lance Corporal	Constable; Polis	Recruit; Rikrut
Vanuatu Maritime Wing
Vanuatu Maritime Wing			Senior sergeant Long sajen	Sergeant; Sajen	Corporal; Kofol		Constable; Polis	Recruit; Rikrut

== Former rank insignia ==
Commissioned officer ranks

The rank insignia of commissioned officers.

Rank group	General / flag officers		Senior officers			Junior officers
Vanuatu Mobile Forces
Vanuatu Mobile Forces	Major General	Brigadier	Colonel	Lieutenant Colonel	Major	Captain	1st Lieutenant	Lieutenant	Officer Cadet

Other ranks

The rank insignia of non-commissioned officers and enlisted personnel.

Rank group	Senior NCOs				Junior NCOs		Enlisted
Vanuatu Mobile Forces							No insignia
Vanuatu Mobile Forces	Warrant officer class 1	Warrant officer class 2	Staff sergeant	Sergeant	Corporal	Lance corporal	Private (or equivalent)
