= Pacific Maritime Security Program =

Australian military aid program

The Pacific Maritime Security Program is a program initiated by Australia to aid neighbouring Pacific Island nations, such as Timor-Leste, Fiji, Palau, Kiribati and Tonga. The program includes the maintenance of port facilities, training, and the transfer of 21 Guardian-class patrol boats. The program was initiated under the 2018 Boe Declaration on Regional Security.

== Overview ==
According to the website of the Australian defence ministry, the program is aimed towards increasing regional maritime security in the Pacific, and is a continuation of the older Pacific Patrol Boat Program. The allocated spending is $2 billion AUD over 30 years, and will include shipbuilding, aerial surveillance of the region, and improvements to coordination between the various nations. Australia has pledged 21 Guardian-class patrol boats to 12 Pacific nations and these are planned to be delivered between 2018 and 2023. As of late 2022, 15 such vessels have been delivered.

== Impacts and criticism ==
According to a paper by the Royal Australian Navy, the PMSP and its predecessor the Pacific Patrol Boat Program (PPBP) were created in part because of the large exclusive economic zones of various Pacific nations and their lack of ability to properly police them. This led to illegal and damaging maritime activity in the region, such as illegal, unreported and unregulated (IUU) fishing. However, the PPBP induced heavy economic pressure on the island nations, hence reducing their participation in the program. Critics such as Graeme Cheeseman characterised the program as a form of Australian economic coercion.

The PMSP aims to remedy these issues by increasing support for infrastructure, housing, and civilian/contracted aerial surveillance capability. However, there are several shortcomings to the program:

- The program does not make reference to the impact of climate change on the region, which is expected to be highly severe.
- IUU fishing activity is expected to increase as global fishing stocks decrease, creating an unaccounted for impact on the island nation economies.
- The program has not taken into account the inability of the smaller nations to adequately maintain the older patrol boats, let alone the more advanced Guardian-class.
- Despite efforts, the program is unable to ensure that recipients have operational self-sustainability, i.e. that they can protect their maritime borders without the PMSP.

Moreover, in June 2022, defects were discovered in the design of the boats, including flaws that would have allowed carbon monoxide buildup in parts of the ship. This caused some of the involved nations to pause the use of the patrol boats.

== List of delivered vessels ==
- RFNS Savenaca, delivered to Fiji on 6 March 2020
- RKS Teanoai II, delivered to Kiribati 18 June 2021
- RVS Takuare, delivered to Vanuatu 1 August 2021
- RSIPV Taro, delivered to Solomon Islands 9 May 2021
- Te Kukupa II, delivered to Cook Islands 27 May 2022
- VOEA Late, delivered to Tonga in October 2025.
