= RKS Teanoai =

Kiribati patrol vessel

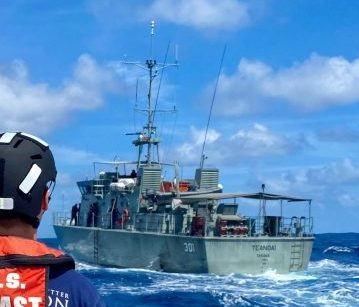
- RKS Teanoai, during a joint exercise, on November 7, 2019

History

Kiribati
- Name: Teanoai
- Operator: Kiribati
- Launched: 1994
- Commissioned: January 1994
- Identification: Call sign: T3GP
- Status: Ship in active service

General characteristics
- Class & type: Pacific Forum-class patrol boat
- Displacement: 162 tons
- Length: 103 ft (31 m)

RKS Teanoai (301) was a Pacific Forum-class patrol boat operated by the Republic of Kiribati Police. Teanoai was one of twenty-two small patrol vessels Australia designed and built for smaller fellow members of the Pacific Forum, after the United Nations Convention on the Law of the Sea extended control of a 200-kilometre (108 nmi) exclusive economic zone for all maritime nations.

Teanoai was replaced by the larger and more capable Guardian-class patrol vessel Teanoai II in May 2021, and decommissioned thereafter.

== Operational history ==
In 2006 Teanoai worked with the Greenpeace ship Esperanza on fishery patrol.

In February 2018 Teanoai and RMIS Lomor performed open ocean exercises and a joint patrol of their waters. On November 7, 2019, Teanoai rendezvoused with USCGC Stratton. The vessels' crews engaged in boarding exercises, with Stratton's pursuit boat, and her on-board helicopter both being used.
