= HMPNGS Rochus Lokinap =

Patrol boat of Papua New Guinea

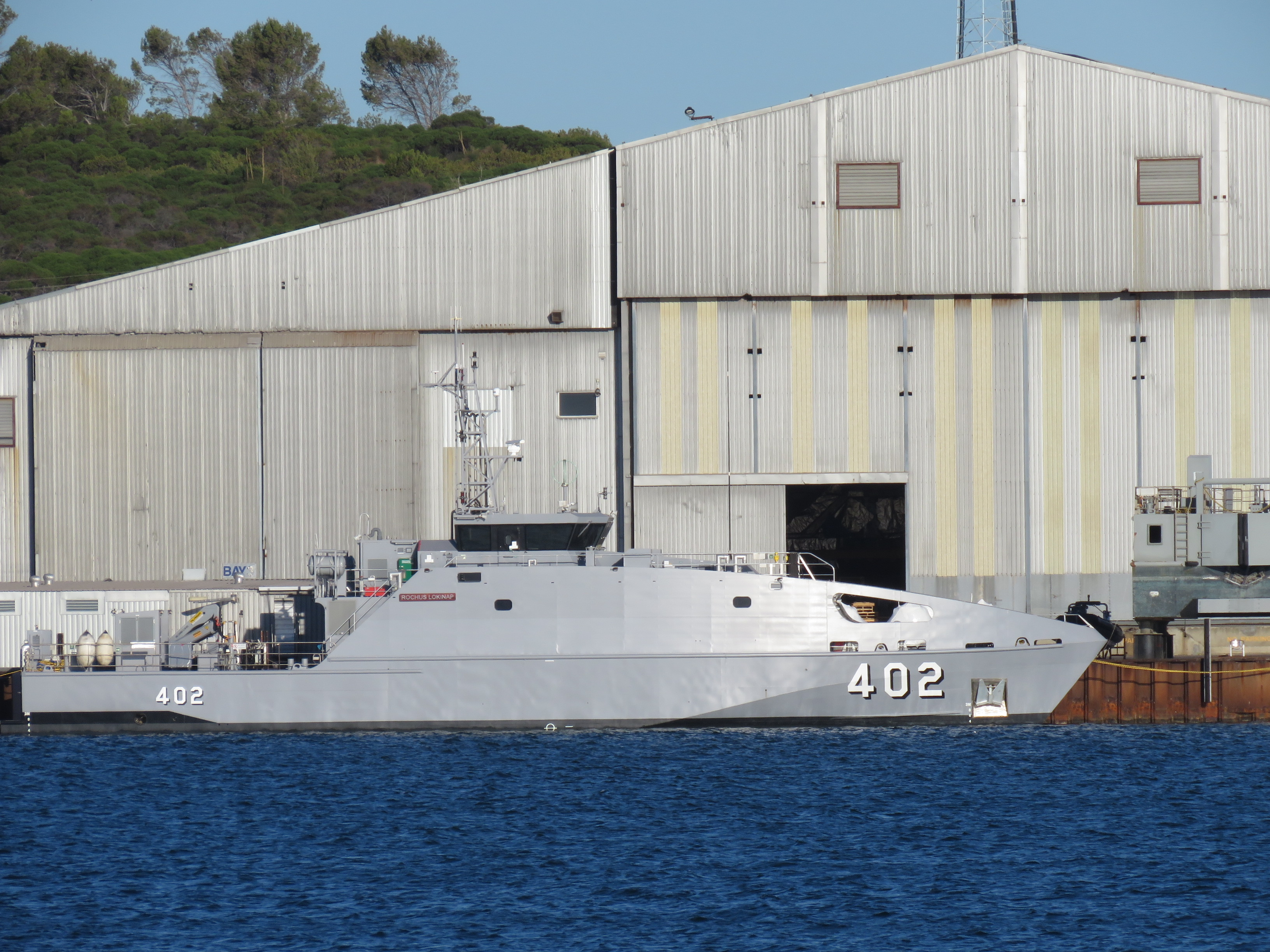
Rochus Lokinap at the Austal shipyard in Henderson, Western Australia in January 2021

HMPNGS Rochus Lokinap is a Guardian-class patrol boat of the Papua New Guinea Defence Force. Australian shipbuilder Austal had delivered Rochus Lokinap to the Department of Defence. The vessel was then gifted by Australia to Papua New Guinea in March 2021 and commissioned in October.

On 4 September, Rochus Lokinap participated in the mobile Fleet Review in the event of the 50th Independence Day of Papua New Guinea. The review was held at the Port Moresby harbour and was conducted and led by INS Kadmatt. A total of seven warships from five nations took part in the review formation, with the other ships being the French patrol vessel Auguste Bénébig, HMPNGS Gilbert Toropo, HMPNGS Ted Diro, VOEA Ngahau Koula and HMAS Childers. Each ship sailed at an interval of 550 metres (600 yd) with precision.
