= HMPNGS Rabaul =

Papua New Guinea Defence Force vessel

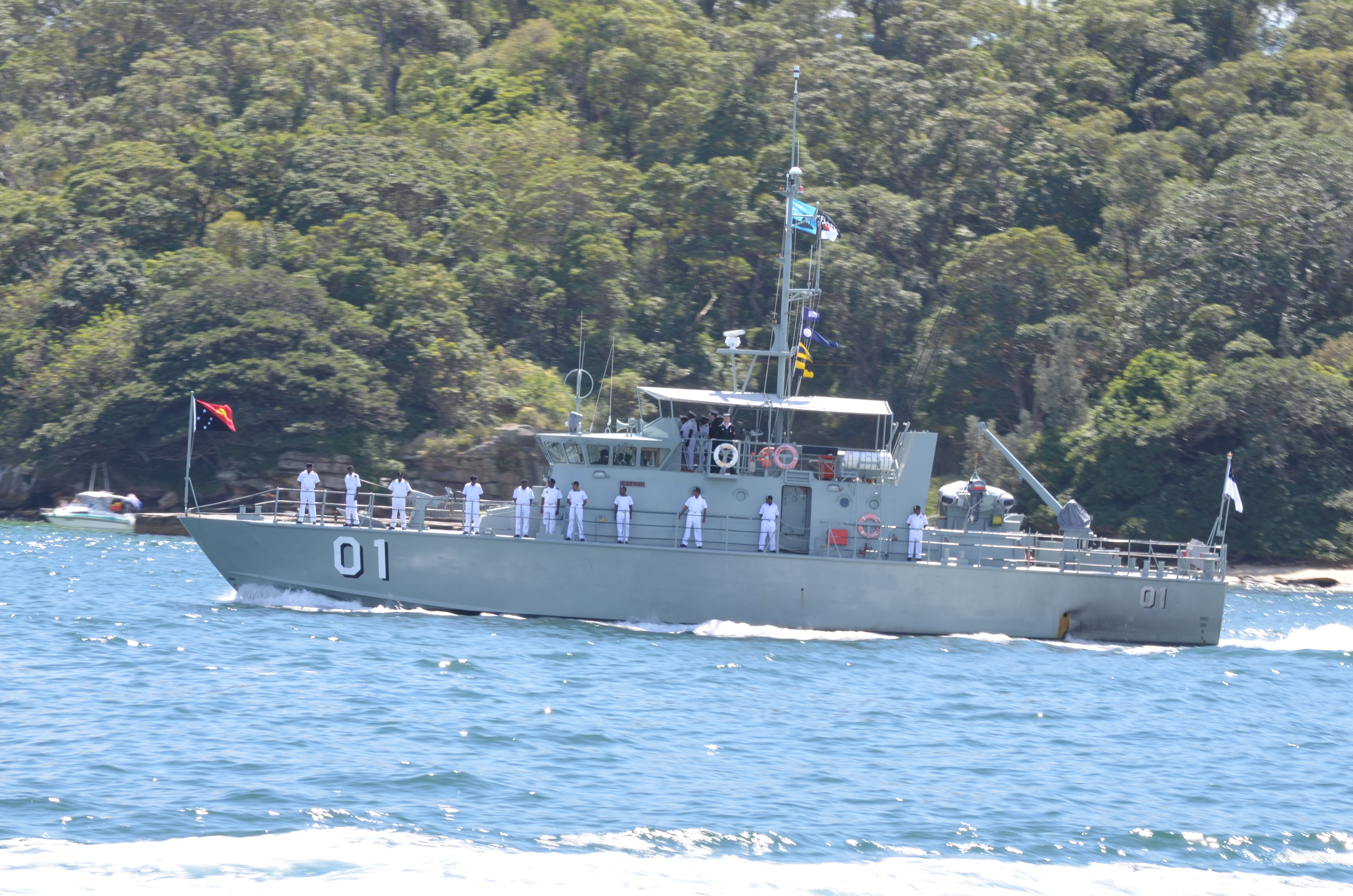

History

Papua New Guinea
- Name: Rabaul
- Operator: Papua New-Guinea Defence Force
- Launched: 1987
- Decommissioned: August 2018
- Fate: Scrapped

General characteristics
- Class & type: Pacific Forum-class patrol boat
- Displacement: 162 tons
- Length: 103 feet (31 m)

HMPNGS Rabaul (01) was the first Pacific Forum patrol vessel to be commissioned, in May 1987. She is not the first vessel of the class to go out of service, because her sister ship from Fiji RFNS Kiro was wrecked in 2016. She arrived in Port Moresby, for disposal, on October 24, 2018. The vessel was named HMPNGS Tarangau.

Australia gave Papua New Guinea four vessels, and gave an additional eighteen vessels to neighboring countries in the Pacific Forum. Australia gave these vessels to her smaller neighbors after the United Nations Convention of the Laws of the Sea established that maritime nations had 200-kilometre (120 mi) exclusive economic zone. Australia gave these vessels so its neighbours could police their own sovereignty.

== Design ==
Australia designed the vessels using commercial off-the-shelf technology, so small countries would find them easier to maintain, in small remote shipyards. Australia fully equipped the ships, prior to delivery, with the exception of providing armament, but they are capable of mounting an autocannon on the foredeck.

== Operational history ==
Rabaul and her sister ships played a role in the Bougainville conflict.

== Replacement ==
Australia started building a new, larger, and more capable class of patrol vessels, to replace the Pacific Forum class. Rabaul was replaced by HMPNGS Ted Diro, in December 2018.
