= HMPNGS Ted Diro =

Papua New Guinea Defence Force vessel

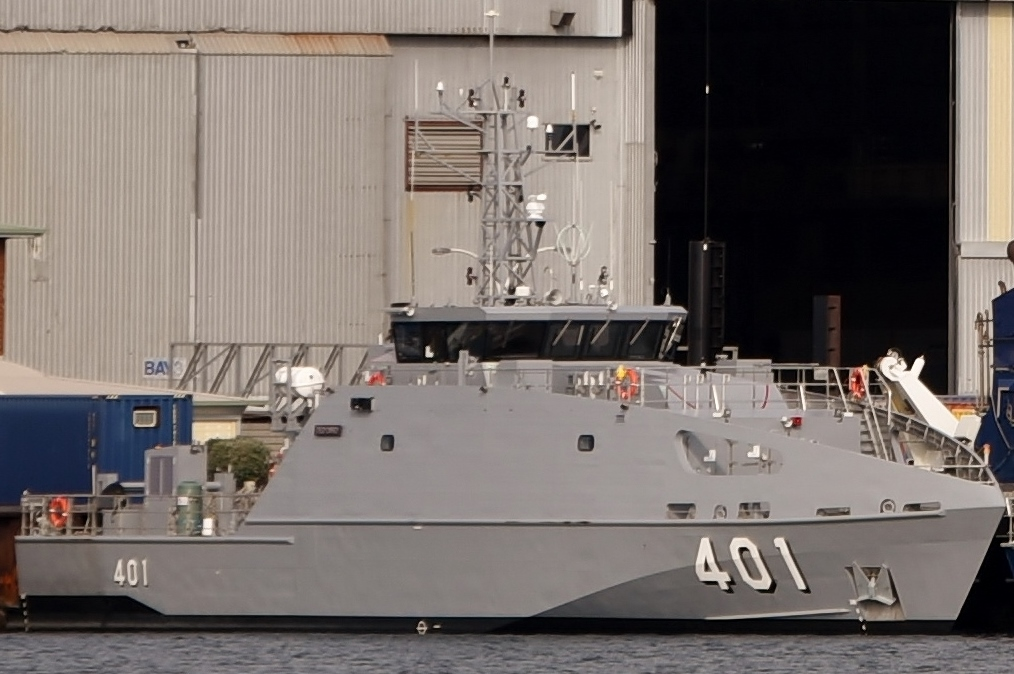
- Ted Diro at the Austal shipyards in Henderson, Western Australia in September 2018

History

Papua New Guinea
- Name: Ted Diro
- Namesake: Ted Diro
- Builder: Austal
- Laid down: 31 July 2017
- Launched: 29 May 2018
- Acquired: 30 November 2018
- Commissioned: 1 February 2019
- Identification: IMO number: 4734104; MMSI number: 553111885; Callsign: P2DQ

General characteristics
- Class & type: Guardian-class patrol boat
- Length: 39.5 m (130 ft)
- Beam: 8 m (26 ft)
- Draft: 2.5 ft (0.76 m)
- Propulsion: 2 × Caterpillar 3516C diesels, 2 shafts
- Speed: 20 knots (37 km/h; 23 mph)
- Range: 3,000 nautical miles (5,600 km; 3,500 mi) at 12 knots (22 km/h; 14 mph)
- Armament: Australia provides the ships without armament, but they are designed to be able to mount heavy machine guns, or an autocannon of up to 30mm on the foredeck

HMPNGS Ted Diro (P401) was the first Guardian-class patrol boat to be completed. Australia designed and provided four Pacific Forum-class patrol vessels to Papua New Guinea in 1987 and 1988, and in 2015 confirmed she would be replacing those vessels with four larger, and more capable, Guardian-class vessels.

Ted Diro replaced HMPNGS Rabaul. Australia transferred the vessel to Papua New Guinea on 30 November 2018.

== Background ==
Following the United Nations Convention on the Law of the Sea extension of maritime nations' exclusive economic zones to 200 kilometres (108 nmi) Australia agreed to provide twelve of its neighbours with 22 Pacific Forum-class patrol vessels, so they could exercise sovereignty over their own extended EEzs, using their own resources. The first vessel was delivered in 1987, and in 2015 Australia announced plans to replace the original patrol boats with larger and more capable vessels.

== Design ==
Australian shipbuilder Austal won the $335 million Australian dollar contract for the project, and built the vessels at its Henderson shipyard, near Perth. Guardian class vessels were designed to use commercial off-the-shelf components, not cutting edge, military grade equipment, to make them easier to maintain in small isolated shipyards.

The vessels are 39.5 metres (130 ft) long, can travel 3,000 nautical miles (5,600 km) at 12 knots (22 km/h). Their maximum speed is 20 knots (37 km/h). Their design allows the recipient nations to mount a pair of heavy machine guns, on either flank, and possibly an autocannon of up to 30mm, on the foredeck.

== Operational history ==
Ted Diro was the first Guardian-class vessel to have her keel laid in July 2017. She was the first to be launched, in May 2018. She began her formal sea trials on 9 August 2018. The patrol vessel is scheduled to be commissioned in late October, when her acceptance trials are completed.

On 22 October 2018 the Post Courier reported that delivery was scheduled for December. Diro, head of the PNGDF Major General Gilbert Toropo and Angus Campbell, Chief of the Australian Defence Force, attended the vessel's commissioning, on 1 February 2019.

In August 2019 two warships of the Japan Maritime Self-Defense Force visited Port Moresby. The Japanese vessels hosted the crew of Ted Diro, together with local VIPs, and her crew hosted visiting Japanese personnel on tours of Ted Diro.

On 17 October 2019 The Australian reported that Ted Diro's engines had broken down, and she had to be towed back to Cairns, for repairs. On 4 September 2025, Ted Diro participated in the mobile Fleet Review in the event of the 50th Independence Day of Papua New Guinea. The review was held at the Port Moresby harbour and was conducted and led by INS Kadmatt. A total of seven warships from five nations took part in the Review formation, with the other ships being the French patrol vessel Auguste Bénébig, HMPNGS Gilbert Toropo, HMPNGS Rochus Lokinap, VOEA Ngahau Koula and HMAS Childers. Each ship sailed at an interval of 550 metres (600 yd) with precision.
