= RKS Teanoai II =

Patrol boat of the Kiribati Maritime Police

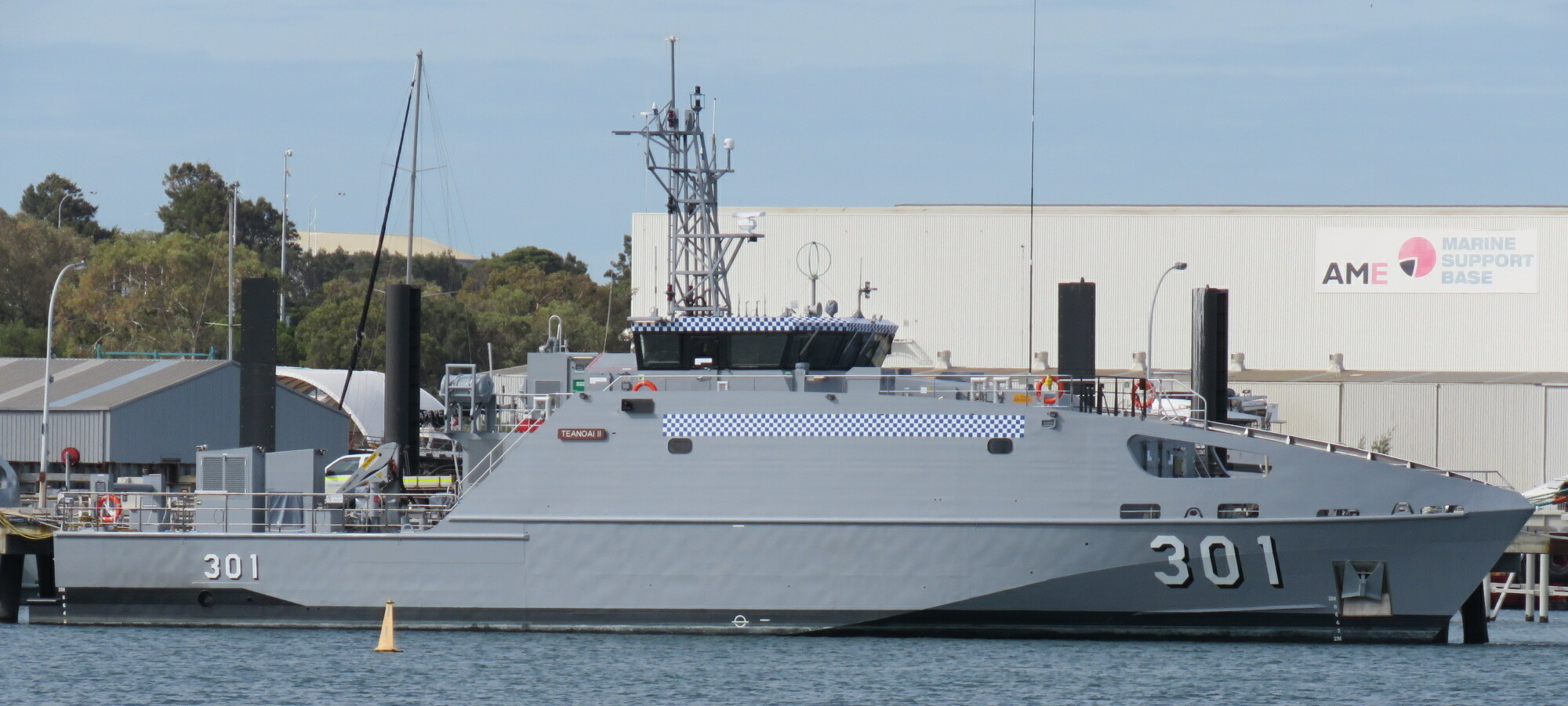
- RKS Teanoai II at Austal shipyards in Henderson, September 2020.

History

Kiribati
- Name: RKS Teanoai II
- Operator: Kiribati Maritime Police
- Port of registry: Tarawa
- Yard number: 528
- Launched: 20–23 April 2020
- Acquired: 18 June 2021
- In service: 2021–present
- Home port: Tarawa
- Identification: Call sign: T3GP; IMO number: 4734178; MMSI number: 529011000; Pennant number: 301
- Status: In service

General characteristics
- Type: Patrol boat
- Length: 39.5 m (129 ft 7 in)
- Beam: 8 m (26 ft 3 in)
- Draught: 2.5 m (8 ft 2 in)
- Propulsion: 2 × Caterpillar 3516C diesels, 2 shafts
- Speed: 20 knots (37 km/h; 23 mph)
- Range: 3,000 nmi (5,600 km; 3,500 mi) at 12 knots (22 km/h; 14 mph)
- Complement: 23
- Sensors & processing systems: X-band radar; differential GPS; gyrocompass; depth sounding machine; Electronic Chart Display and Information System; autopilot

RKS Teanoai II (301) is a Guardian-class patrol boat in service with the Kiribati Maritime Police. She was given to the Republic of Kiribati by Australia as part of the Pacific Maritime Security Program, in which Australia donates patrol boats to neighbouring Pacific Island nations in order to improve regional maritime security. She was the eighth boat of her class when launched in April 2020, but became the eleventh to be delivered due to delays caused by the COVID-19 pandemic. She was officially handed over to the Kiribati police crew at the Austal shipyard in Henderson, Western Australia on 18 June 2021, replacing the 27-year-old Pacific-class patrol boat RKS Teanoai as the small island nation's sole maritime security craft.

== Background ==
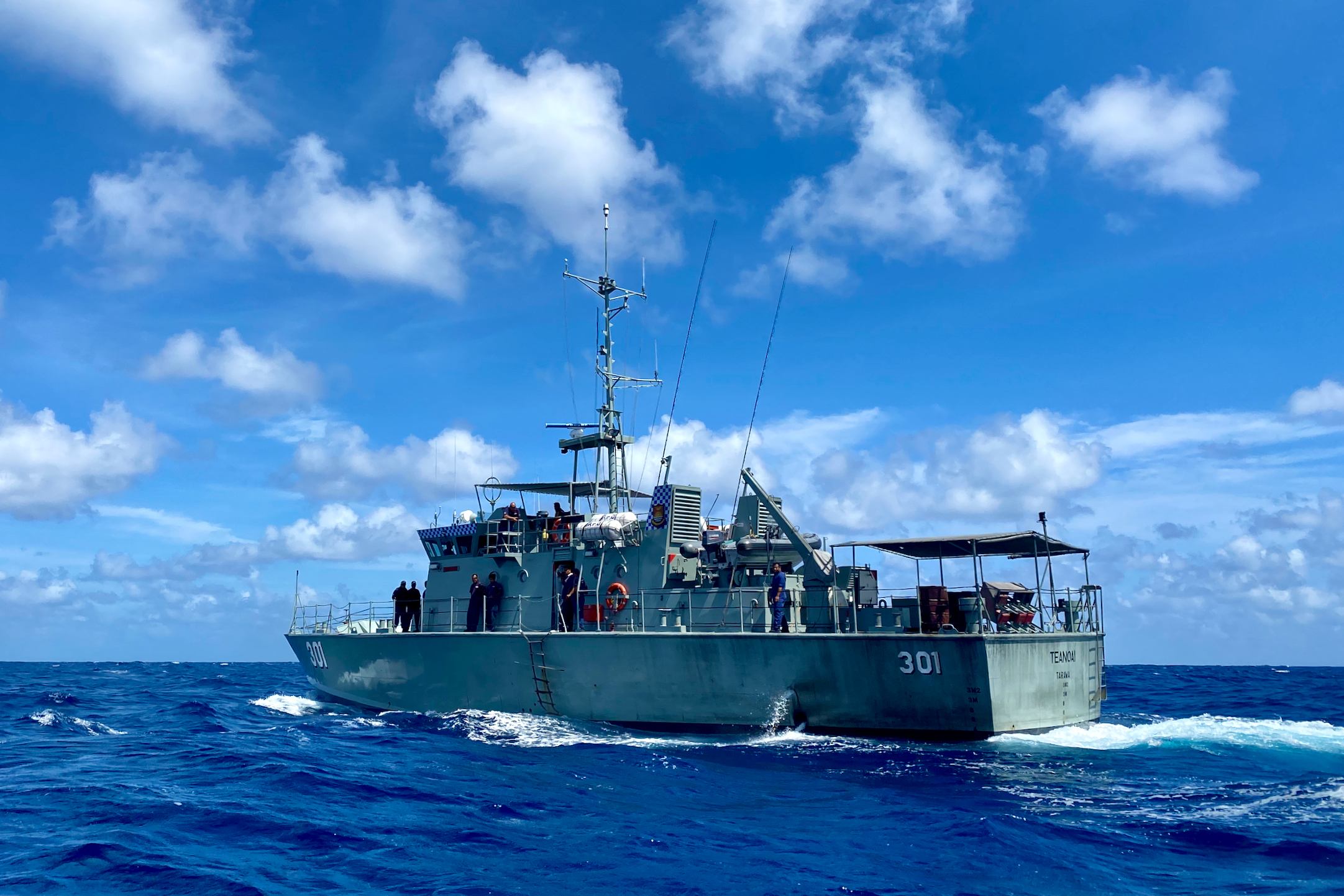
Pacific class RKS Teanoai

Following the 1982 United Nations Convention on the Law of the Sea, the Pacific Islands nations found themselves in need of capable yet economical vessels to patrol their exclusive economic zones. In an effort to improve regional maritime security as well as diplomatic relations with the island states, the Australian government launched the Pacific Patrol Boat Program in 1983, in which they would build and gift 22 Pacific-class patrol boats to 12 Pacific Island nations over the next 14 years. The patrol boats were built with commercial off-the-shelf-components in order to ease maintenance costs for the island nations. Australia remained involved with maintaining the class for the next three decades, with a refit after 15 years of operation.

The RKS Teanoai was delivered to Kiribati in 1994. She was decommissioned on 5 May 2021, in a ceremony attended by the Australian High Commissioner to Kiribati, David Yardley.

The Australian government announced the Pacific Patrol Boat Replacement Project on 17 June 2014. A contract for the construction of at least 19 boats and an initial seven-year maintenance and support period was signed with Austal on 4 May 2016. The keel of the first vessel was laid on 30 July 2017, before she was launched on 30 May 2018.

== Design ==
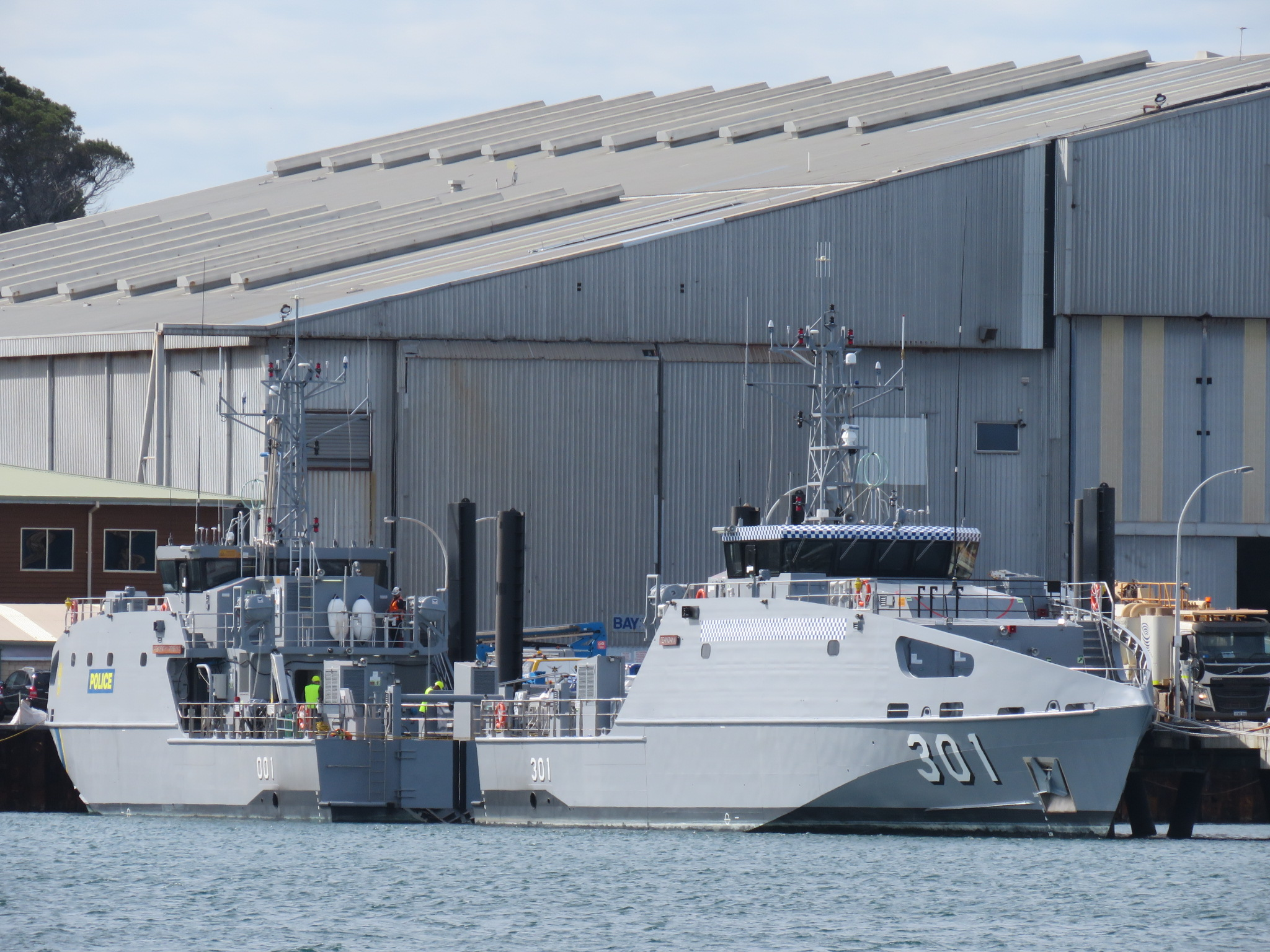
PSS Remeliik II (left) and RKS Teanoai II at Austal shipyards in Henderson, September 2020.

The Guardian class uses a steel monohull design based on that of the Bay class, which had been in service with the Australian Border Force since 1999. The patrol boats are 39.5 metres (129 ft 7 in) long with two habitable internal decks below the bridge. They are capable of traveling 3,000 nautical miles (5,600 km; 3,500 mi) at 12 knots (22 km/h; 14 mph), and have a maximum speed of 20 knots (37 km/h; 23 mph). They have two Caterpillar 3516C 2,000-kilowatt (2,700 hp) diesel engines powering two fixed-pitch propellers. A key design goal being ease of maintenance to accommodate small and isolated shipyards, the class uses commercial off-the-shelf components.

In addition to the commanding officer's quarters, the boats have seven living quarters designed to berth 20 crew members. Three of them are staterooms that have their own showers in order to accommodate a mixed-sex crew. They also have a sick bay with a separate ventilation system, which during normal operations is used as two berths, bringing the total complement up to 23.

The vessels have a stern launching ramp enabling launch of a WRH635 fast rescue boat without requiring the parent ship to first come to a halt. These are SOLAS-certified rigid-hulled inflatable boats designed to carry up to 15 persons. They are 6.35 metres (20 ft 10 in) long, with two Yamaha 67 kW (90 hp) outboard motors and an operational weight of 2,612.5 kilograms (5,760 lb). The stern is also equipped with a port side crane serving a 16-square-metre (170 sq ft) cargo deck.

Australia instructed that the boats would be delivered without armament, but they were designed to be capable of mounting an autocannon of up to 30 millimetres (1.2 in) on their foredeck, and a 0.50-calibre machine gun both port and starboard in front of the bridge.

In June 2022, three design flaws were reported in the media. This included cracking in the coupling between the engine and the gear box, the sick bay ventilation system recirculating air and an exhaust leak causing carbon monoxide to enter the normally non-crewed engine compartment.

== Delivery ==
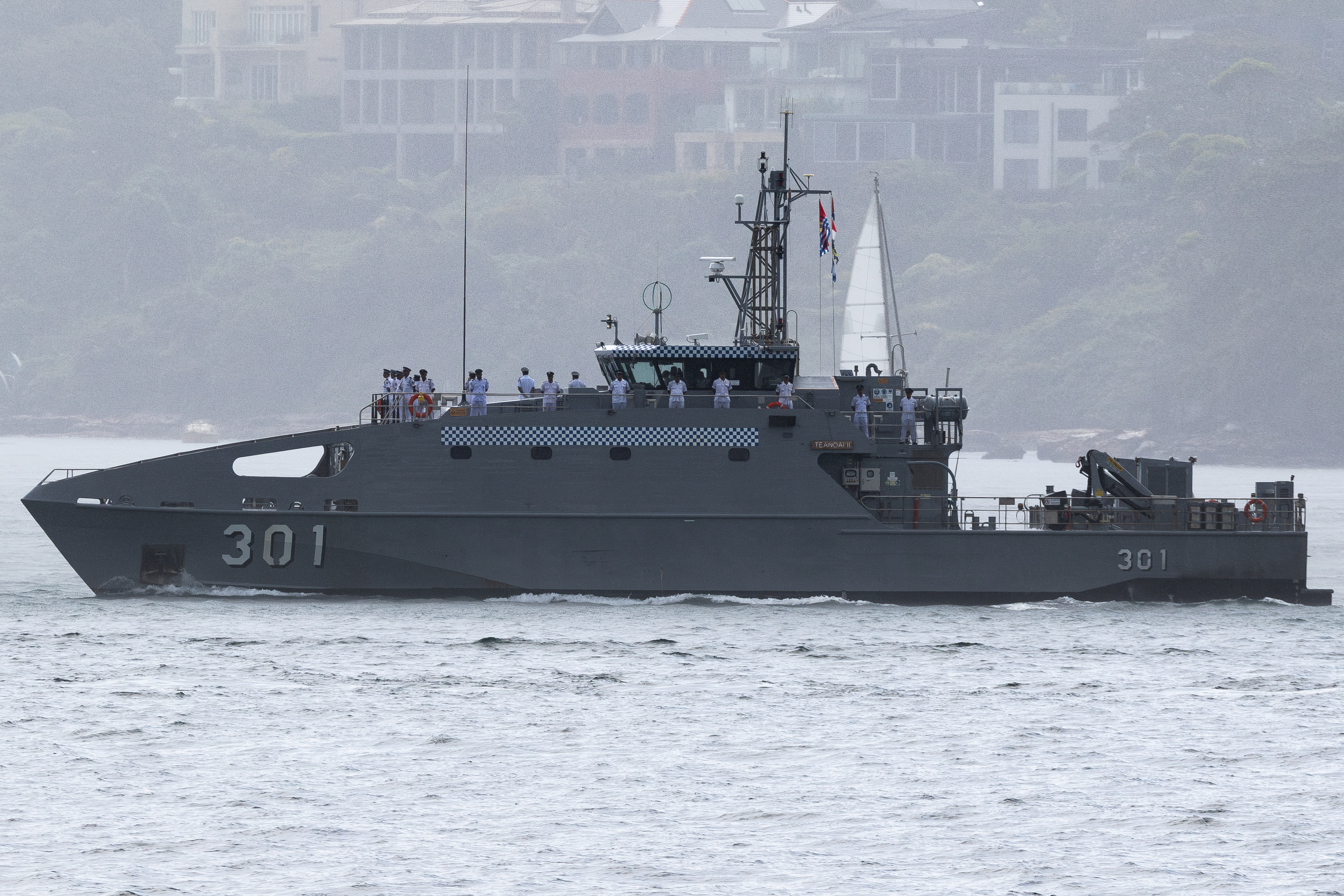
RKS Teanoai II sailing into Sydney Harbour as part of the Exercise Kakadu Fleet Review 2026.

The Teanoai II was the eighth Guardian-class patrol boat to be launched by Austal, between 20 April and 23 April 2020, and was originally scheduled to be delivered to the Kiribati Police Maritime Unit later in the summer. However, the Kiribati police crew were at the time unable to collect her due to COVID-19 travel policies, which pushed her delivery into 2021.

She was eventually given to Kiribati in a certificate signing ceremony in Henderson on 18 June 2021, and thus became the eleventh boat of her class. In attendance were, among others, Mr Vince Connelly (MP for Stirling) and Mr Paul Wenham (Honorary Consul General to Kiribati), along with the Teanoai II's first commanding officer, Superintendent Tom Redfern, and the rest of her new crew.

She arrived in her home port of Tarawa in mid-August, having sailed via Cairns and the Solomon Islands.

== Service history ==
In March 2026, the ship participated in the Royal Australian Navy's Exercise Kakadu Fleet Review on Sydney Harbour.
