= CIPPB Te Kukupa II =

Cook Islands patrol boat

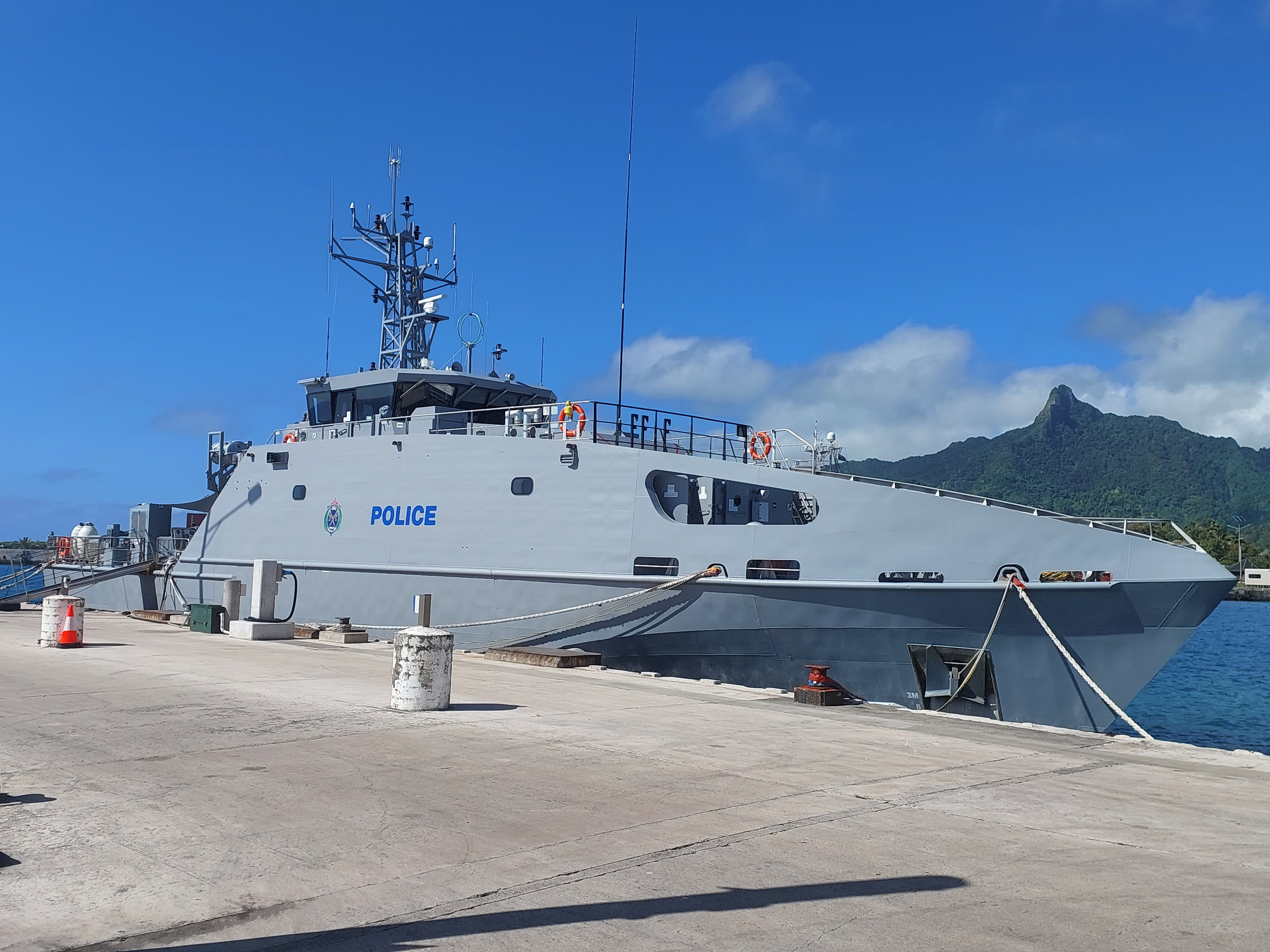
- Te Kukupa II in Avarua harbour in July 2023

History

Cook Islands
- Name: Te Kukupa II
- Builder: Austal
- Launched: January 2022
- Acquired: 9 June 2022
- Identification: IMO number: 4734245; MMSI number: 518998268; Callsign: E5U4248
- Status: In service

General characteristics
- Class & type: Guardian-class patrol boat
- Length: 39.5 m (130 ft)
- Beam: 8 m (26 ft)
- Draft: 2.5 ft (0.76 m)
- Propulsion: 2 × Caterpillar 3516C diesels, 2 shafts
- Speed: 20 knots (37 km/h; 23 mph)
- Range: 3,000 nautical miles (5,600 km; 3,500 mi) at 12 knots (22 km/h; 14 mph)
- Armament: Australia provides the ships without armament, but they are designed to be able to mount heavy machine guns, or an autocannon of up to 30mm on the foredeck

Te Kukupa II is a Guardian-class patrol boat built in Australia for the Cook Islands. It replaced the original Te Kukupa, supplied to the Cook Islands three decades earlier. Her crew is drawn from the Cook Islands Police Service.

At the farewell of Te Kukupa I, Australian High Commissioner Christopher Watkins noted the original Te Kukupa had been a gift from Australia at a time when Australia and the Cook Islands "were united in our anger at French nuclear testing." Rather than Australia expanding its own Navy, the Hawke Government had decided to empower its Pacific partners. “We would trust that the stronger and safer our Pacific partners were, the stronger and safer Australia would be."

Australia supplied 22 Pacific Forum-class patrol boats to 12 of its smaller Pacific Forum allies when the United Nations Convention on the Law of the Sea established that maritime nations controlled an economic exclusion zone 200 kilometres (120 mi) off their coasts.

== Design ==
Australia designed the vessels to use commercial off the shelf components, rather than cutting edge military grade components, to make it easier to maintain the vessels in small, isolated shipyards. The vessels have a maximum speed of 20 knots (37 km/h; 23 mph), and have a complement of approximately 20 crewmembers. They are able to launch and retrieve a pursuit boat from a stern launching ramp without requiring the parent vessel to a halt.

== Operational history ==
Te Kukupa II was launched in January 2022. It was formally handed over to the Cook Islands at a ceremony on 9 June 2022, and arrived in Rarotonga on 20 July 2022. In August 2022 it transported COVID-19 vaccines to Palmerston Island.

In March 2026, the ship participated in the Royal Australian Navy's Exercise Kakadu Fleet Review on Sydney Harbour.
