= Cook Islands Police Service =

Agency overview
- Employees: 107 (2016)

Jurisdictional structure
- Operations jurisdiction: Cook Islands
- General nature: Civilian police

Operational structure
- Headquarters: Avarua
- Elected officer responsible: Hon. Vaine Mokoroa, Minister for Police
- Agency executive: Terepu Keenan, Commissioner of Police

Website
- Official Facebook page

The Cook Islands Police Service (CIPS) is the police force of the Cook Islands. The current Commissioner of Police is Maara Tetava who was first appointed in 2009 and in 2011 was reappointed.

== Operations ==
On 19 October 2016, an escaped prisoner fatally shot his ex-wife and her new partner before turning the gun on himself in Rarotonga. A review of the incident was conducted by former Commissioner Tevai Matapo and retired Australian Federal Police Assistant Commissioner Denis McDermott. The police service is implementing the recommendations of the review including forming a Tactical Support Unit to respond to firearms incidents as earlier recommended by a New Zealand Police review in 2015.

Radio New Zealand reported on 16 May 2017 that twenty percent of the police force had resigned, over the last year, over concerns that they were the most poorly paid government workers. New officers earn NZD$14,000.

== Maritime wing ==
Among the Police Service's mandate is exercising sovereignty over the nation's 200-kilometre (120 mi) exclusive economic zone (EEZ). When the United Nations Convention on the Laws of the Seas extended maritime nations' EEZs Australia provided a patrol boat to the Cook Islands and patrol boats to 11 other fellow members of the Pacific Forum. The Cook Islands operated a Pacific-class patrol boat, the CIPPB Te Kukupa, from 1989 to 2022, having received a re-fit in 2015. A larger and more capable Guardian-class patrol boat, CIPPB Te Kukupa II, that built in Australia entered service in 2022 to replace the Te Kukupa for the police force.
