= French patrol vessel Auguste Bénébig =

French offshore patrol vessel

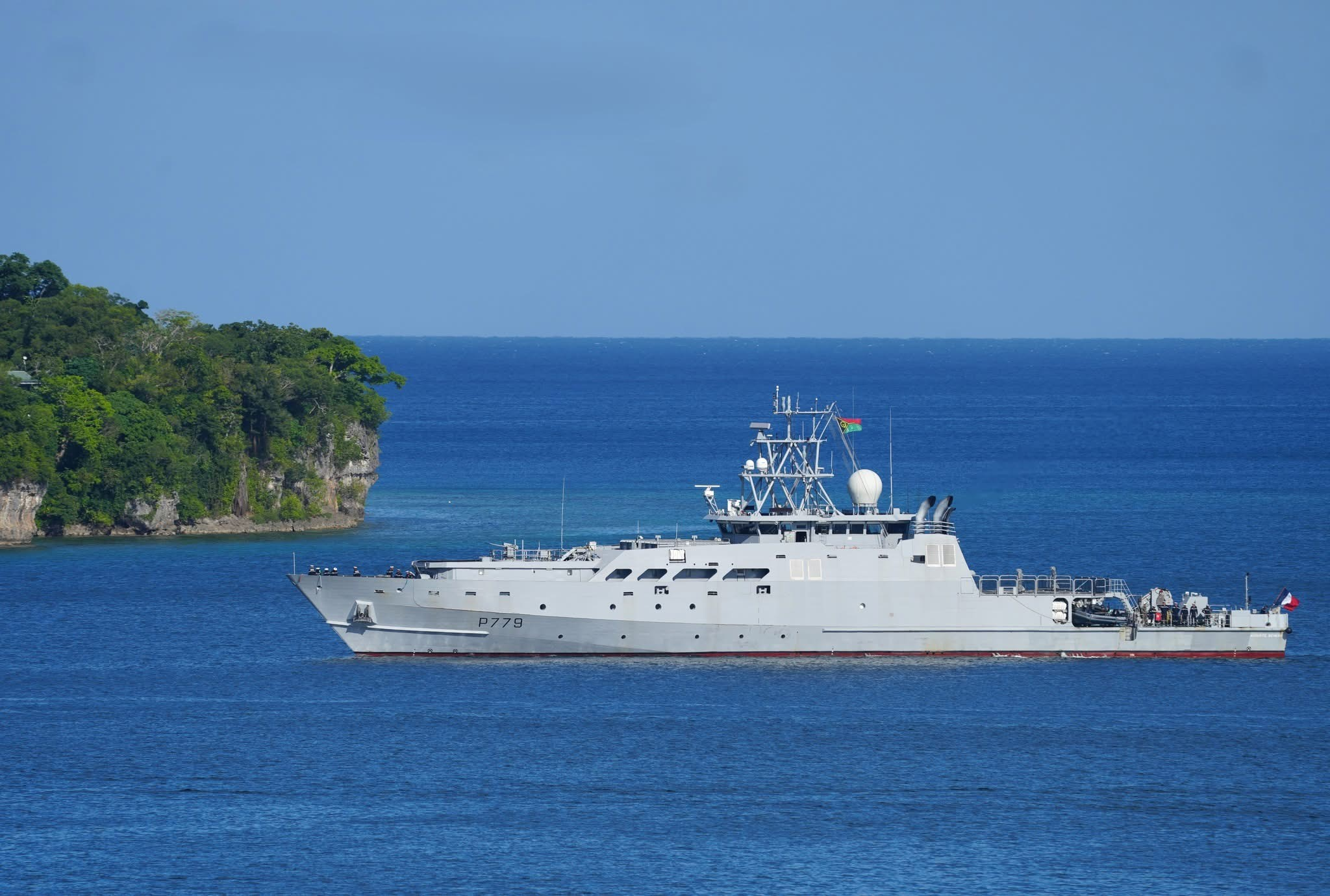
- Auguste Bénébig In Port Vila

History

France
- Name: Auguste Bénébig
- Builder: Socarenam, Saint-Malo
- Laid down: 8 October 2020
- Launched: 15 October 2021
- Completed: 17 January 2023
- In service: 5 May 2023

General characteristics
- Class & type: Patrouilleur Outre-mer offshore patrol vessel
- Displacement: 1,300 t (1,300 long tons)
- Length: 79.9 m (262 ft 2 in)
- Beam: 12 m (39 ft 4 in)
- Draught: 3.5 m (11 ft 6 in)
- Installed power: Combined diesel–electric and diesel 3 × 550 kW (740 hp) engine–generators 2 × 3.85 MW (5,160 hp) diesels
- Propulsion: 2 × propellers
- Speed: 24 knots (44 km/h; 28 mph)
- Range: 5,500 nmi (10,200 km; 6,300 mi)
- Boats & landing craft carried: 2 × 8 m (26 ft) RHIB
- Capacity: 29 passengers
- Complement: 30
- Armament: 1 × single 20 mm (0.8 in) autocannon; 2 × single 12.7 mm (0.50 in) M2 Browning machine guns; 2 × single 7.62 mm (0.30 in) FN MAG machine guns
- Aircraft carried: Survey Copter Aliaca UAV

Auguste Bénébig is a Patrouilleur Outre-mer (French: Overseas Patrol Ship), also known as the Félix Éboué class, an offshore patrol vessel built for the French Navy (French: Marine nationale) in the 2020s. Completed in 2023, she is assigned to the French territory of New Caledonia.

== Service history ==
On 4 September 2025, Auguste Bénébig participated in the mobile Fleet Review in the event of the 50th Independence Day of Papua New Guinea. The review was held at the Port Moresby harbour and was conducted and led by INS Kadmatt. A total of seven warships from five nations took part in the review formation, with the other ships being HMPNGS Gilbert Toropo, HMPNGS Ted Diro, HMPNGS Rochus Lokinap, VOEA Ngahau Koula, and HMAS Childers. Each ship sailed at an interval of 550 metres (600 yd) with precision.

In March 2026, the ship participated in the Royal Australian Navy's Exercise Kakadu Fleet Review on Sydney Harbour.

== Bibliography ==
- Huriet, Roland (2023). Waters, Conrad (ed.). Auguste Bénébig: First of France's New Patrouilleurs Outre-Mer. Annapolis, Maryland: Naval Institute Press. ISBN 978-1-68247-484-6.
