= FSM National Police =

Federated States of Micronesia's National Police
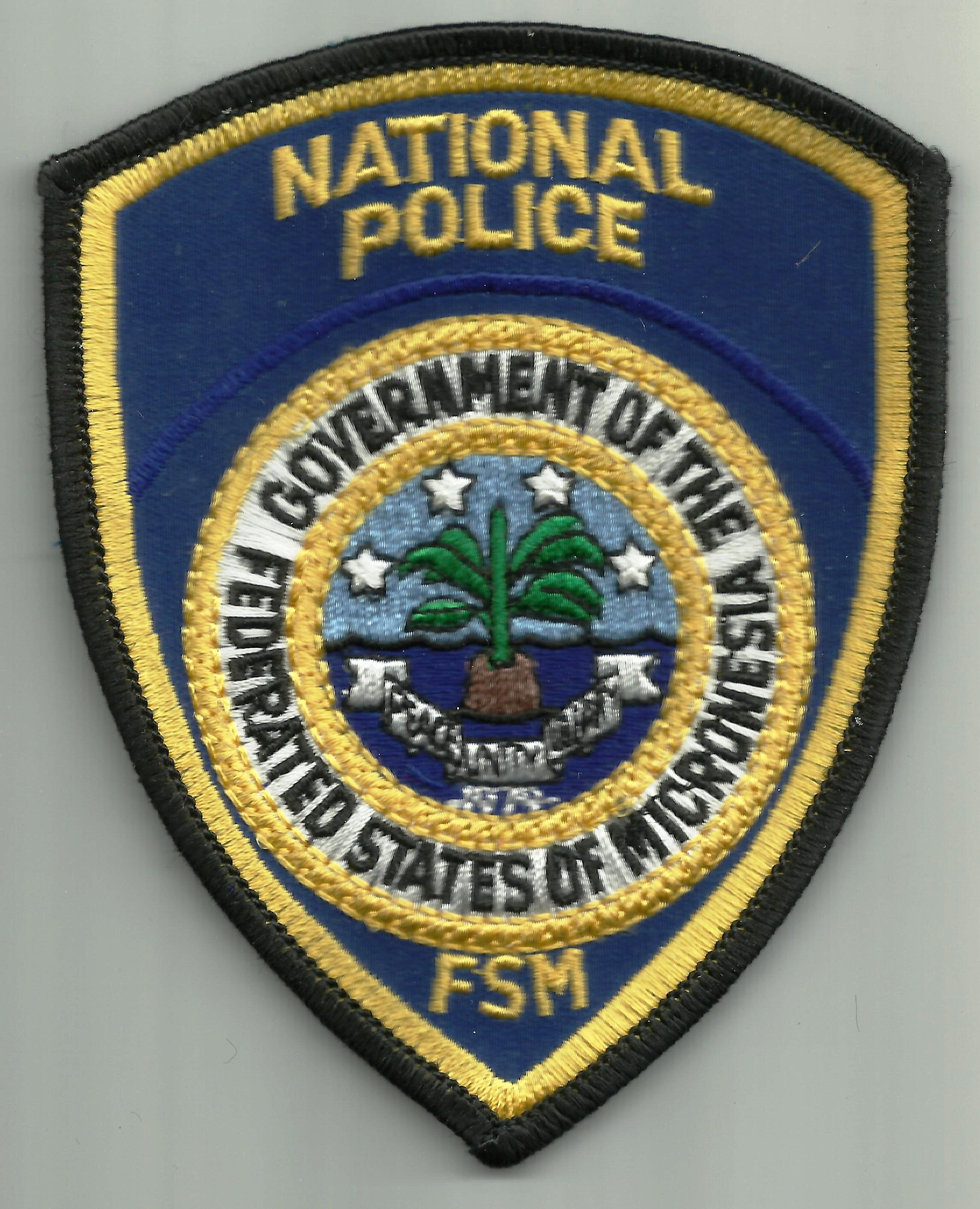
- Common name: FSM National Police

Agency overview
- Legal personality: Police

Jurisdictional structure
- Operations jurisdiction: FSM
- General nature: Civilian police

Operational structure
- Headquarters: Palikir, FSM
- Parent agency: Department of Justice
- Child agency: Maritime Wing

The Federated States of Micronesia's National Police (commonly referred to as the FSM National Police) is the small national police force of the Federated States of Micronesia and is a division of the FSM Department of Justice.

== Role ==
The FSM National Police is specifically mandated to enforce fishery laws, the Controlled Substance Act, the Weapons Control Act, Search and Rescue, protection of government officials and visiting foreign diplomats, and laws that are national in nature or crimes against the government.

Other functions include medical evacuation, assistance in disaster relief operations, emergency communications and technical support and training state law enforcement agencies.

The National Police is managed and administered from its headquarters at the capital, Palikir. The Maritime Wing, an integral unit of the National Police, is situated at the dock in Dekehtik, Pohnpei.

The Federated States of Micronesia also have state police departments for Kosrae, Pohnpei, Chuuk, and Yap, as well as municipal departments for Kitti, Kolonia, Madolenihmw, Nett, Sapwuahfik, Sokehs and U on Pohnpei; Polle, Fono, Losap, Nema, Udot, Uman and Tol in the Chuuk chain; and Tafunsak on Kosrae.

The Federated States of Micronesia has provided police officers to the Regional Assistance Mission to Solomon Islands since March 2006.

Federated States of Micronesia Police officer Kelly Samuel is contingent commander of the FSM police serving as part of RAMSI's Participating Police Force (PPF).

The Chuuk Department of Public Safety acting director is Jimmy Emilio, the Pohnpei DPS director is Benito Cantero, the Pohnpei police chief is Kerley Araceley, and the Pohnpei Division of Correction and Rehabilitation chief is Yoster Donre.

== Equipment ==
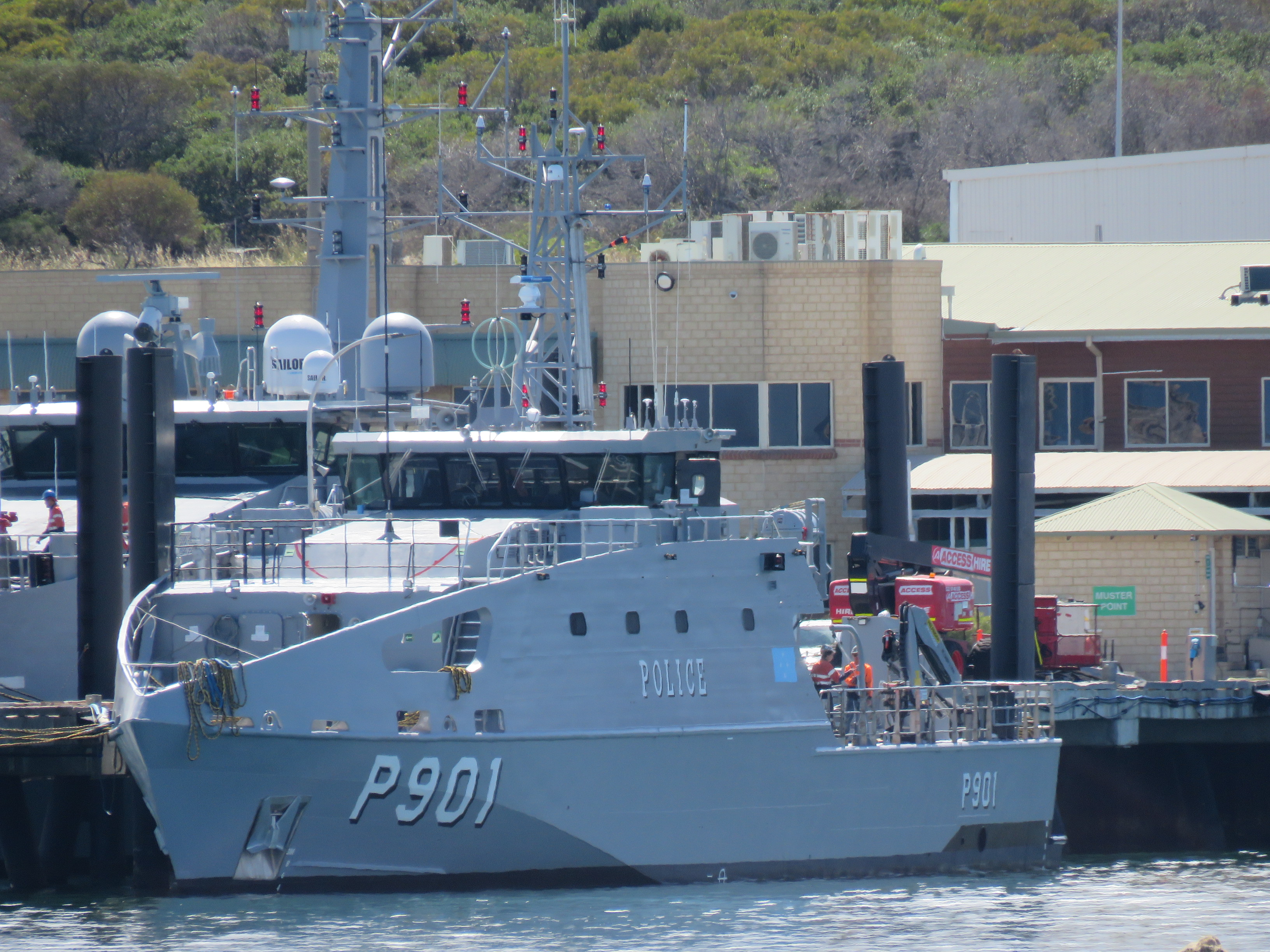
FSS Tosiwo Nakayama, one of two Guardian-class patrol boats of the Federated States of Micronesia

Type	Amount
RQ-20	2 Systems
Guardian class patrol boat	2

== Police ranks ==
Officer ranks

Rank group	General / flag officers	Senior officers		Junior officers
(Federated States of Micronesia) Maritime Wing
(Federated States of Micronesia) Maritime Wing		Commander	Lieutenant commander	Lieutenant	Sub-lieutenant	Officer cadet

Other ranks

Rank group	Senior NCOs	Junior NCOs	Enlisted
(Federated States of Micronesia) Maritime Wing
