= RVS Takuare =

Guardian-class patrol boat

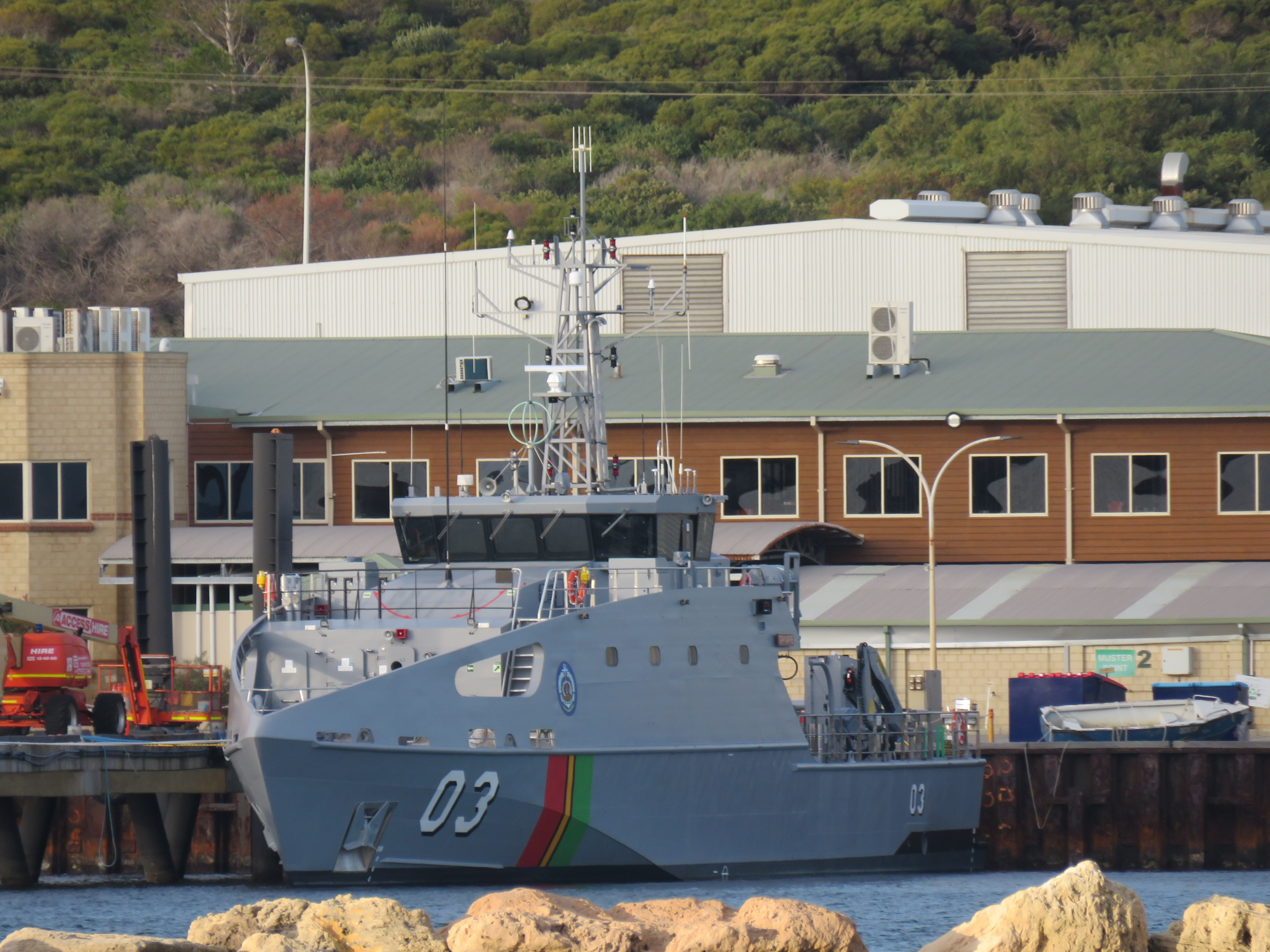
- RVS Takuare at the Austal shipyard in Henderson, Western Australia, July 2021

History

Vanuatu
- Owner: Republic of Vanuatu
- Operator: Vanuatu Police Maritime Wing
- Yard number: 532
- Laid down: March 2021
- Acquired: 30 July 2021
- Home port: Mela Base Wharf, Port Vila
- Identification: Call sign: YJS7; IMO number: 4734219; MMSI number: 576014000
- Status: In service

General characteristics
- Class & type: Guardian-class patrol boat
- Length: 39.5 m (129 ft 7 in)
- Beam: 8 m (26 ft 3 in)
- Draught: 2.5 m (8 ft 2 in)
- Propulsion: 2 × Caterpillar 3516C diesels, 2 shafts
- Speed: 20 knots (37 km/h; 23 mph)
- Range: 3,000 nmi (5,600 km; 3,500 mi) at 12 knots (22 km/h; 14 mph)
- Complement: 23
- Sensors & processing systems: X-band radar; differential GPS; gyrocompass; depth sounding machine; Electronic Chart Display and Information System; autopilot

RVS Takuare is a Guardian-class patrol boat in service with the Vanuatu Police Maritime Wing. She was given to Vanuatu by Australia as part of the Australian government's Pacific Maritime Security Program on 30 July 2021. Her predecessor, the RVS Tukoro, was the second vessel of the first iteration of the Pacific Patrol Boat Program, and served in the same role from 1987 to 2021. The Takuare is currently the only naval or law enforcement vessel operated by the Pacific Island nation.

== Background ==
Following the 1982 United Nations Convention on the Law of the Sea, the Pacific Islands nations found themselves in need of capable yet economical vessels to patrol their exclusive economic zones, extended by the convention to 200 kilometres (108 nmi). In an effort to improve regional maritime security as well as diplomatic relations with the island states, the Australian government launched the Pacific Patrol Boat Program in 1983, in which they would build and gift 22 Pacific-class patrol boats to 12 Pacific Island nations over the next 14 years. The patrol boats were built with commercial off-the-shelf-components in order to ease maintenance costs for the island nations. Australia remained involved with maintaining the class for the next three decades, with a refit after 15 years of operation.

RVS Tukoro was the second vessel of her class and the second Vanuatuan patrol boat. She was delivered to the Vanuatu Police Force in June 1987, and would serve for the next 34 years. She was severely damaged on 14 March 2015 when Cyclone Pam washed her ashore on Moso Island. She returned to service on 23 August 2016 after sixteen months of repairs courtesy of Australia. On 28 May 2021 Vanuatu officials held a small farewell ceremony marking the last departure of Tukoro from the Mala Base Wharf in Port Vila, for her final voyage to Australia.

The Australian government announced the Pacific Patrol Boat Replacement Project on 17 June 2014. A contract for the construction of at least 19 boats and an initial 7-year maintenance and support period was signed with Austal on 4 May 2016. The keel of the first vessel was laid on 30 July 2017, before she was launched on 30 May 2018.

== Design ==
The Guardian class uses a steel monohull design based on that of the Bay class, which had been in service with the Australian Border Force since 1999. The patrol boats are 39.5 metres (129 ft 7 in) long with two habitable internal decks below the bridge. They are capable of travelling 3,000 nautical miles (5,600 km; 3,500 mi) at 12 knots (22 km/h; 14 mph), and have a maximum speed of 20 knots (37 km/h; 23 mph). They have two Caterpillar 3516C 2,000-kilowatt (2,700 hp) diesel engines powering two fixed-pitch propellers. A key design goal being ease of maintenance, the class uses commercial off-the-shelf components.

In addition to the commanding officer's quarters, the boats have seven living quarters designed to berth 20 crew members. Three of them are staterooms that have their own showers in order to accommodate a mixed-sex crew. They also have a sick bay with a separate ventilation system, which during normal operations is used as two berths, bringing the total complement up to 23.

The vessels have a stern launching ramp for a WRH635 fast rescue boat. These are SOLAS-certified rigid-hulled inflatable boats designed to carry up to 15 people. They are 6.35-metre (20 ft 10 in) long, with two Yamaha 90-horsepower (67 kW) outboard motors and an operational weight of 2,612.5 kg (5,760 lb). The stern is also equipped with a port side crane serving a 16-square-metre (170 sq ft) cargo deck.

Australia instructed that the boats would be delivered without armament, but they were designed to be capable of mounting an autocannon of up to 30 millimetres (1.2 in) on their foredeck, and a 0.50-calibre machine gun both port and starboard in front of the bridge.

In June 2022, three design flaws were reported in the media. This included cracking in the coupling between the engine and the gear box, the sick bay ventilation system recirculating air and an exhaust leak causing carbon monoxide to enter the normally non-crewed engine compartment.

== Naming contest ==
On 16 October 2020 the Vanuatu Police Force announced a week-long naming contest for their new patrol ship. They received seven submissions from the public, along with explanations of their meanings. A three-member panel met on 28 October and recommended the submission made by the commanding officer of Tukoro, Chief Inspector Kalsaf Treson Alick, which was then approved by the Acting Commissioner of Police. Captain Alick would not live to see Takuare delivered. The prefix RVS stands for "Republic of Vanuatu Ship", and the pennant number 03 signifies that Takuare is the third patrol boat that Vanuatu has operated. The name translates both to "tribal warrior" and "stand up and unite".

The etymology behind the name Takuare stems from traditional custom governance systems of the Shefa Province islands (the Shepherds group and Efate islands). It is a warrior role undertaken by people of high standing, historically serving as guardians against invaders on land or by sea. It can also be more of a traditional Police role, enforcing the Nakamal's rules and laws of the land and sea. And it can also be a role similar to that of a bailiff for orders issued by the chief of a Nakamal. The official naming ceremony was held in Vanuatu on 24 September 2021.

== Delivery ==
In preparation for operating the larger Guardian-class boat, the Australian government funded a project that would demolish and rebuild the home port of the Maritime Wing, the Mala Base Wharf in Port Vila.

Tukoro left Vanuatu on 28 May 2021, headed for Australia on her last voyage, with her crew scheduled to return on board Takuare in September.

The 12th Guardian-class boat was built in 11 weeks at Austal's ship yard in the Australian Marine Complex in Henderson, Western Australia, and was handed over to Vanuatu in a certificate signing ceremony held on Vanuatu's Independence Day, 30 July 2021. The ceremony was attended virtually by some individuals due to COVID-19 travel restrictions. In attendance were, among others, the Vanuatu High Commissioner to Australia Mr. Samson Vilvil Farray, the Australian Minister for Defence Industry Melissa Price, the commanding officer of Takuare, Chief Inspector Dicky Obed of the Vanuatu Police Maritime Wing and the rest of Takuare's new crew.

Due to local criticism concerning a lack of ceremony surrounding the decommissioning of Tukoro, Vanuatu authorities decided to hold several custom ceremonies, welcoming their new patrol boat, leading up to her arrival on 28 September 2021. She was then received by a large crowd at Port Vila on 30 September 2021.

== Operational history ==
From 25 October to 5 November 2021 Takuare spotted four and fined two unlicensed fishing vessels as part of Operation Kurukuru. In April 2022 she was unable to partake in a joint operation with the Royal Australian Navy as she was on standby for a vaccination rollout.

In the second week of June 2022, the Takuare docked indefinitely at SinoVan wharf in Port Vila due an engine exhaust problem. Black smoke containing (toxic) carbon monoxide was leaking into the engine room, causing her commander to pull her out of service pending repairs. The issue caused Australia to issue an advisory to all operators of the vessel. Austal reportedly "accepted that the problems are latent defects that it will work to resolve." She was sent to the Austal maintenance facility in Cairns for a week of repairs, and returned to Vanuatu by 30 July.

In October 2022 she was unable to fulfill her normal duties of transporting ballot boxes to remote islands, as there was a new problem with the hydrogen sulphide aboard the vessel producing toxic gas. The Police Force were expecting to receive specialists from Austal later in the month to assess and rectify the issue. Australia provided assistance with an aircraft and two helicopters to transport the ballot boxes.

== Sports competitions ==
Both the Vanuatu Police Force (VPF) and RVS Takuare muster men's teams to compete in local tournaments under the Asia-Pacific Rugby League. The VPF also musters a women's team. All teams competed in the Icon Reeves Luganville Nines Championships held at Santo East High School in Luganville on 1 and 2 October 2022. The championship had been won by the men's VPF-team in 2021, and was won by the Takuare-team and the women's VPF-team in 2022.

== See also ==
- Defiant-class patrol vessel, the United States is providing 13 small patrol vessels to small Caribbean nations
- Pacific-class patrol boat, the predecessor to the Guardian class
- Pacific Islands Forum
- Forum Fisheries Agency
- Operation Kurukuru
