= HMAS Childers =

2006 Armidale-class patrol boat

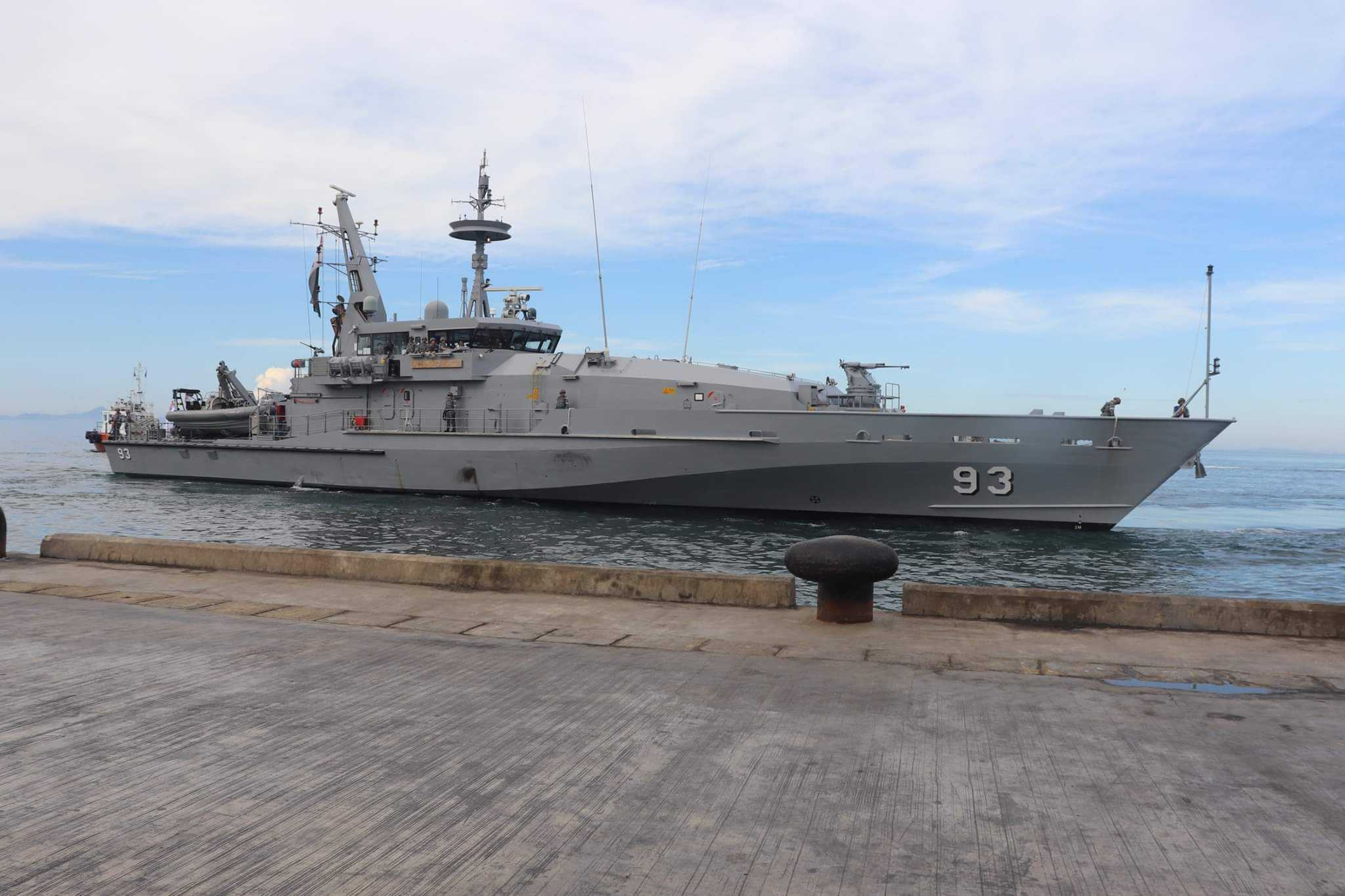
- HMAS Childers at Zamboanga City Pier

History

Australia
- Namesake: Towns of Childers, Queensland and Childers, Victoria
- Launched: 18 December 2006
- Commissioned: 7 July 2007
- Decommissioned: 4 December 2025
- Home port: HMAS Cairns, Cairns
- Identification: MMSI number: 503211000; Callsign: VKPR
- Motto: "Serve With Honour"
- Status: Decommissioned
- Badge

General characteristics
- Class & type: Armidale-class patrol boat
- Displacement: 300 tons standard load
- Length: 56.8 m (186 ft)
- Beam: 9.7 m (32 ft)
- Draught: 2.7 m (8.9 ft)
- Propulsion: 2 × MTU 4000 16V 6,225 horsepower (4,642 kW) diesels driving twin propellers
- Speed: 25 knots (46 km/h; 29 mph)
- Range: 3,000 nautical miles (5,600 km; 3,500 mi) at 12 knots (22 km/h; 14 mph)
- Endurance: 21 days standard, 42 days maximum
- Boats & landing craft carried: 2 × Zodiac 7.2 m (24 ft) RHIBs
- Complement: 21 standard, 29 maximum
- Sensors & processing systems: Bridgemaster E surface search/navigation radar
- Electronic warfare & decoys: Prism III radar warning system; Toplite electro-optical detection system; Warrlock direction finding system
- Armament: 1 × Rafael Typhoon stabilised gun mount fitted with a 25 mm (1 in) M242 Bushmaster autocannon; 2 × 12.7 mm (0.5 in) machine guns

HMAS Childers (ACPB 93) was an Armidale-class patrol boat of the Royal Australian Navy (RAN). Named for the towns of Childers, Queensland and Childers, Victoria, Childers is the only ship in the RAN to be named after two towns.

== Design and construction ==
The Armidale-class patrol boats are 56.8 metres (186 ft) long, with a beam of 9.7 metres (32 ft), a draught of 2.7 metres (8 ft 10 in), and a standard displacement of 270 tons. The semi-displacement vee hull is fabricated from aluminium alloy, and each vessel is built to a combination of Det Norske Veritas standards for high-speed light craft and RAN requirements. The Armidales can travel at a maximum speed of 25 knots (46 km/h; 29 mph), and are driven by two propeller shafts, each connected to an MTU 16V M70 diesel. The ships have a range of 3,000 nautical miles (5,600 km; 3,500 mi) at 12 knots (22 km/h; 14 mph), allowing them to patrol the waters around the distant territories of Australia, and are designed for standard patrols of 21 days, with a maximum endurance of 42 days.

The main armament of the Armidale class is a Rafael Typhoon stabilised 25-millimetre (0.98 in) gun mount fitted with an M242 Bushmaster autocannon. Two 12.7-millimetre (0.50 in) machine guns are also carried. Boarding operations are performed by two 7.2-metre (24 ft), waterjet propelled rigid-hulled inflatable boats (RHIBs). Each RHIB is stored in a dedicated cradle and davit, and is capable of operating independently from the patrol boat as it carries its own communications, navigation, and safety equipment.

Each patrol boat has a standard ship's company of 21 personnel, with a maximum of 29. The Armidales do not have a permanently assigned ship's company; instead, they are assigned to divisions at a ratio of two vessels to three companies, which rotate through the vessels and allow the Armidales to spend more time at sea, without compromising sailors' rest time or training requirements. A 20-berth auxiliary accommodation compartment was included in the design for the transportation of soldiers, illegal fishermen, or unauthorised arrivals; in the latter two cases, the compartment could be secured from the outside. However, a malfunction in the sewerage treatment facilities aboard HMAS Maitland in August 2006 pumped hydrogen sulfide and carbon monoxide into the compartment, non-fatally poisoning four sailors working inside, after which use of the compartment for accommodation was banned across the class.

Childers was constructed by Austal at their shipyard in Henderson, Western Australia. She was launched on 18 December 2006, and was commissioned in Cairns, Queensland on 7 July 2007.

== Operational history ==
Assigned to Ardent Division, Childers was based in Cairns and performed border protection and fisheries protection patrols.

In January 2014, Childers visited Burma as part of Australian Government efforts to strengthen relations with the Government of Myanmar; the first RAN ship since HMAS Quiberon in 1959.

On 4 September, Childers participated in the mobile Fleet Review in the event of the 50th Independence Day of Papua New Guinea. The review was held at the Port Moresby harbour and was conducted and led by INS Kadmatt. A total of seven warships from five nations took part in the review formation, with the other ships being the Auguste Bénébig, HMPNGS Gilbert Toropo, HMPNGS Ted Diro, HMPNGS Rochus Lokinap and VOEA Ngahau Koula. Each ship sailed at an interval of 550 metres (600 yd) with precision. Childers was decommissioned on 4 December 2025 at HMAS Coonawarra
