= INS Kadmatt (P29) =

Anti-submarine corvette in the Indian Navy

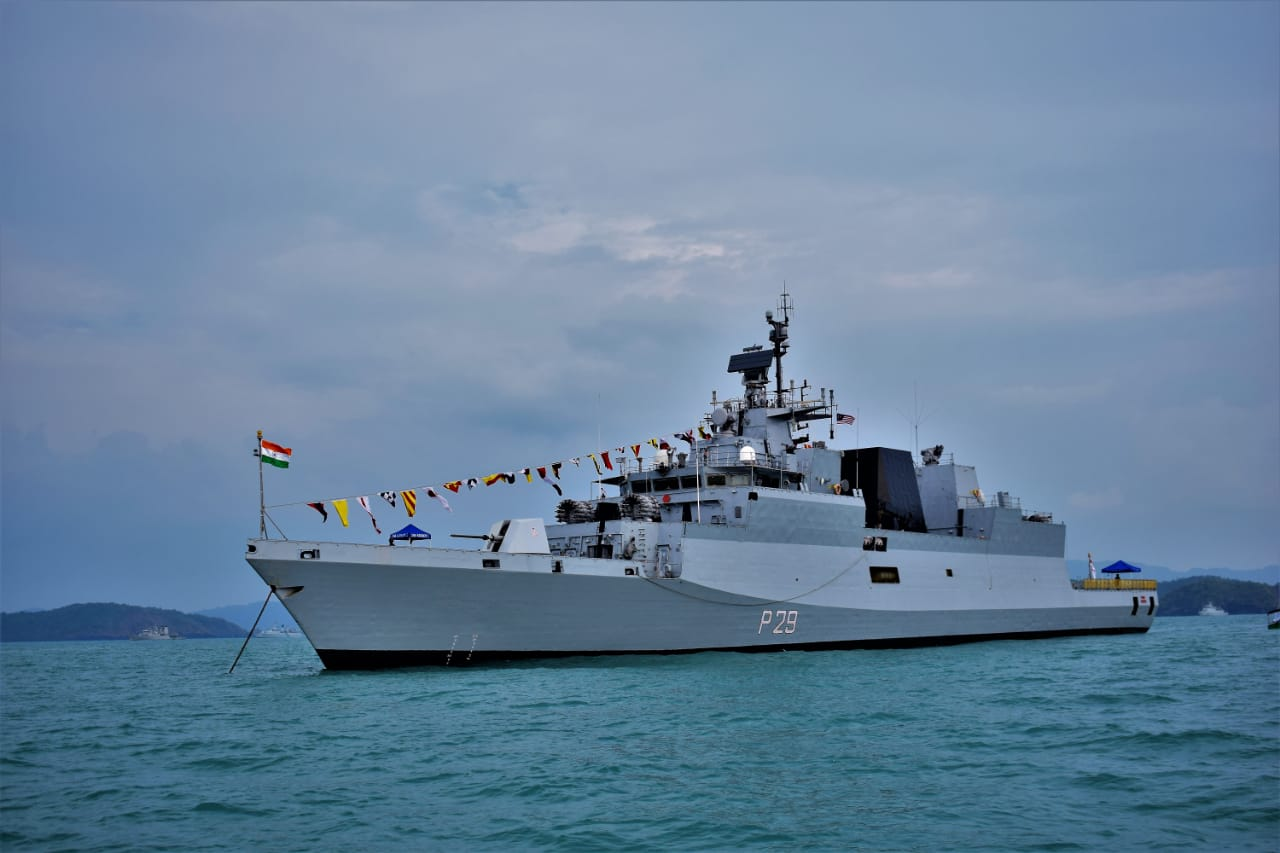
- INS Kadmatt at Langkawi, Malaysia, during LIMA 2019

History

India
- Name: INS Kadmatt
- Namesake: Kadmat Island
- Builder: Garden Reach Shipbuilders and Engineers
- Launched: 25 October 2011
- Acquired: 26 November 2015
- Commissioned: 7 January 2016
- Identification: MMSI number: 419000933; Callsign: AWIB
- Status: Active

General characteristics
- Class & type: Kamorta-class corvette
- Displacement: 3,300 t (3,200 long tons)
- Length: 109 m (357 ft 7 in)
- Beam: 12.8 m (42 ft 0 in)
- Propulsion: 4 × Pielstick 12 PA6 STC diesel engines; CODAD, DCNS raft mounted gearbox
- Speed: 25 knots (46 km/h)
- Range: 3,450 mi (5,550 km) at 18 knots (33 km/h)
- Complement: 123 (17 officers)
- Sensors & processing systems: Revati Central Acquisition Radar; EL/M-2221 STGR fire-control radar; BEL Shikari; BEL RAWL02 (Signaal LW08) antenna communication grid – Gigabit Ethernet-based integrated ship borne data network, with a fiber optic cable backbone running through the vessel; NPOL HUMSA (Hull Mounted Sonar Array); Bomber Electronic warfare (EW) suites – BEL Ajanta
- Electronic warfare & decoys: Sanket electronic warfare system; Kavach decoy launcher; CMS-28 combat management system
- Armament: Anti-air weaponry: 1 × OTO Melara 76 mm Super Rapid Gun Mount (SRGM); 2 × AK-630M CIWS; To be outfitted with VL-SRSAM; Anti-submarine warfare: 2 × RBU-6000 (IRL) anti-submarine rocket launchers; 2 x quad torpedo tubes
- Aircraft carried: 1 Westland Sea King Mk.42B Or HAL Dhruv
- Aviation facilities: Rail-less helo traversing system and foldable hangar door

INS Kadmatt (P29) is the second of four anti-submarine warfare corvettes built for the Indian Navy by the Garden Reach Shipbuilders and Engineers, of Kolkata, under Project 28. She was inducted into the Eastern Naval Command of the Indian Navy.

INS Kadmatt has been named after Kadmat Island in India's Lakshadweep Islands, and carries on the legacy of her predecessor Kadmatt (P78), which served the Indian Navy for 24 years, from 23 December 1968 to 30 November 1992.

== Design and description ==
The primary role of Kadmatt is in anti submarine warfare (ASW) – to protect ships in convoys and ports from enemy submarine attacks. About 90 percent of the ship is indigenous and has been designed by the Indian Navy's in-house organisation, the Directorate of Naval Design and has been constructed using high grade steel (DMR 249A) produced in India.

It produces low levels of radiated underwater noise which reduces its chances of detection. It is equipped with a host of features including anti-aircraft guns, torpedoes and rocket launchers. The ship also has on-board early warning, navigation and fire control radars besides underwater sensors and integrated communication and electronic warfare systems.

The ASW-focused combat system includes four heavyweight torpedo tube launchers and a pair of 12-barreled RBU6000 rocket depth charge launchers featuring several design improvements incorporated by Larsen & Toubro. It is not known if the locally developed Mareech anti-torpedo decoy system has been installed. The fire-control system is the Bharat Electronics IAC Mod C system. While the ships are fitted with a Humsa-NG bow-mounted sonar, an Atlas Elektronik towed array sonar set will be fitted in due course. The ship will also to be fitted with vertical launch surface-to-air missiles.

Kadmatt has a low radio, acoustic, magnetic and infrared (IR) signature owing to an X-shaped hull form, raft-mounted engines and an IR suppression system. The IR suppression system reduces the heat emitted by the ship, reducing the infrared signature, thereby defending the ship from heat-seeking missiles. It will be capable of operating under nuclear, biological and chemical war theaters, acting as a highly sophisticated front line warship of the Indian Navy.

=== Armament ===
Kadmatt is equipped with a wide range of weapon systems. It is fitted with an OTO Melara 76 mm main gun, and uses two AK-630 guns and provision for a 16-cell vertical launching system (VLS) launching Barak 1 missiles as a close-in weapon system, which will be added later. In addition, two RBU-6000 anti-submarine rocket launchers and torpedo tubes capable of firing heavyweight torpedoes.

The sensors of this warship include the advanced bow-mounted sonar and the indigenous 3D-CAR air surveillance radar Revathi with capability to detect targets exceeding 200 km (120 mi). It is also the first warship to be equipped with the Kavach decoy system for protection against anti-ship missiles. Like INS Kolkata, this warship is also commissioned without the critical medium-range surface-to-air missile (SAM) and advanced light towed array sonars (ALTAS), which is planned to be added later.

== Service history ==
The ship was delivered to the Indian Navy on 26 November 2015 and was commissioned on 7 January 2016 by Chief of the Naval Staff Admiral R K Dhowan at naval dockyard in Visakhapatnam.

=== 2017 ===
From 12 to 15 October, Kadmatt along with Satpura visited Sasebo, Japan. The ships took part in PASSEX exercise with destroyer JS Kirisame demonstrating India's commitment to Act East policy and bolstering peace through Indo-Pacific region.

=== 2019 ===
On 25 March, Kadmatt took part in LIMA 19 held at Langkawi, Malaysia. The ship participated during the 15th edition of LIMA and was followed by an exhaustive Indian Navy delegation. Later, the ship took part in the International Fleet Review held in Malaysia.

=== 2021 ===
On 9 August, Kadmatt and Shivalik arrived at Muara, Brunei during their deployment in South East Asia. The ships participated in non-contact exercise during Covid-19 with the Royal Brunei Navy. Later, the ship sailed to Guam to partake in 21st edition of the Malabar naval exercise.

After sailing from Brunei, the ships participated in the 21st edition of Malabar exercise at Guam as a part of their on-going deployment to nations in South East Asia and the Pacific Ocean.

=== 2023 ===
On 3 December, Kadmatt, during a long range deployment visited North Pacific Ocean and entered Yokosuka, Japan. Before its arrival, the ship undertook refueling with JS Towada off Okinawa as a part of reciprocal provisioning of supply and services (RPSS) between the Indian Navy and Japan Maritime Self-Defense Force.

Kadmatt, later arrived in Manila, Philippines on 12 December 2023. Post departure, the ship undertook naval exercise with BRP Ramon Alcaraz in the South China Sea. On 20 December, Kadmatt arrived at Bangkok, Thailand and undertook a maritime exercise with HTMS Rattanakosin. The then Chief of Naval staff, R. Hari Kumar, visited Kadmatt during the Indian Ocean Naval Symposium held on 21 December 2023 hosted by the Royal Thai Navy at Bangkok.

=== 2024 ===
The ship participated in Exercise Malabar 2024 which was held from 8 to 18 October.

=== 2025 ===
On 20 August, Kadmatt arrived at Surabaya, Indonesia, for a three-day exchange visit with the Indonesian Navy. The ship and its crew completed various activities with the Indonesian Navy and departed on 23 August. On 30 August, Kadmatt arrived at Port Moresby, Papua New Guinea, to celebrate and participate in the country's 50th Independence Day Parade. The ship also hosted the Commander of the Papua New Guinea Defence Force.

On 1 September, Kadmatt was chosen as the Officer Conducting the Serial (OCS) to conduct and lead a formation of ships in Port Moresby harbour for the mobile Fleet Review. The event was held on 4 September. The other ships in the formation included the French patrol vessel Auguste Bénébig, HMPNGS Gilbert Toropo, HMPNGS Ted Diro, HMPNGS Rochus Lokinap, VOEA Ngahau Koula, and HMAS Childers. The seven warships from five countries sailed with a precise interval of 550 metres (600 yd).

On 15 September, Kadmatt arrived in Suva, Fiji for a goodwill visit during its three-month deployment.

Between 3 and 5 October, the ship conducted an operational turnaround at the Port of Makassar, Indonesia, during her deployment to the Indo-Pacific.

== Gallery ==
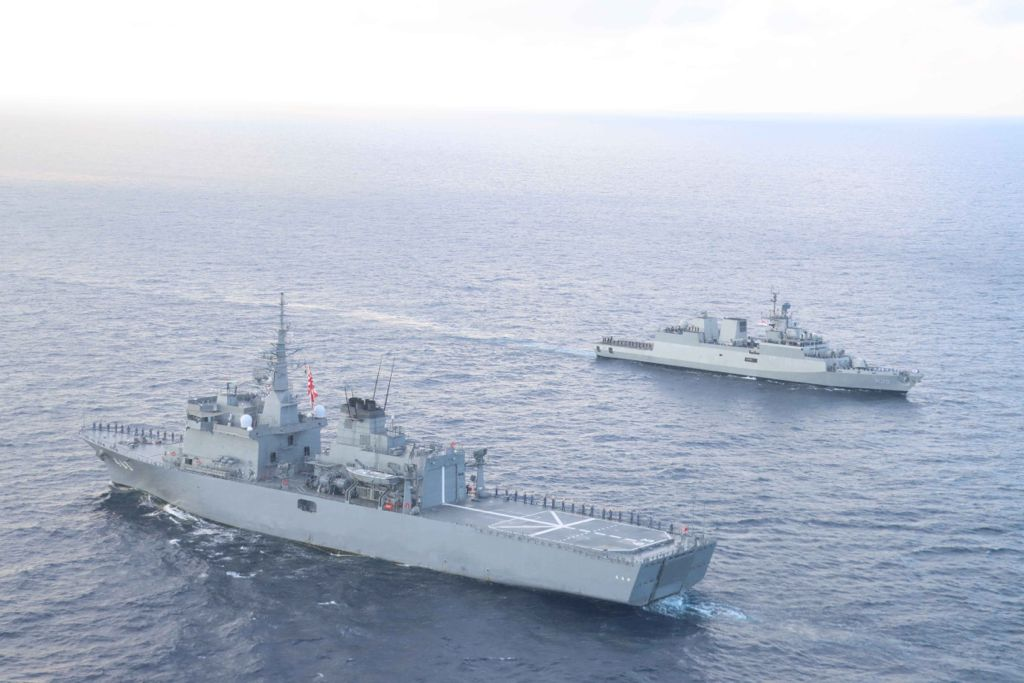
Kadmatt (rear) with JS Uraga (foreground) during an exercise.

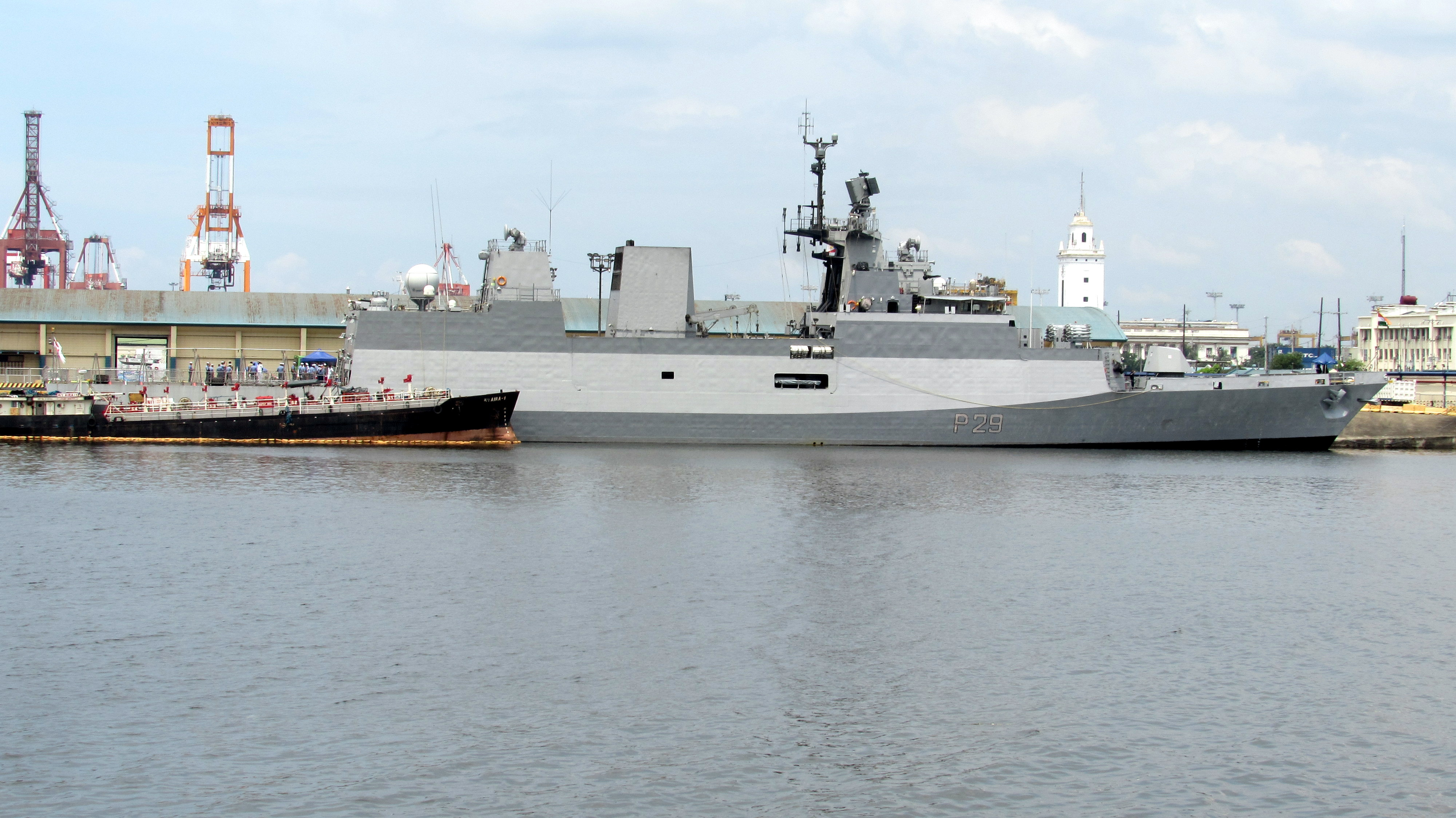
A side view of Kadmatt in Manila South Harbor, Philippines

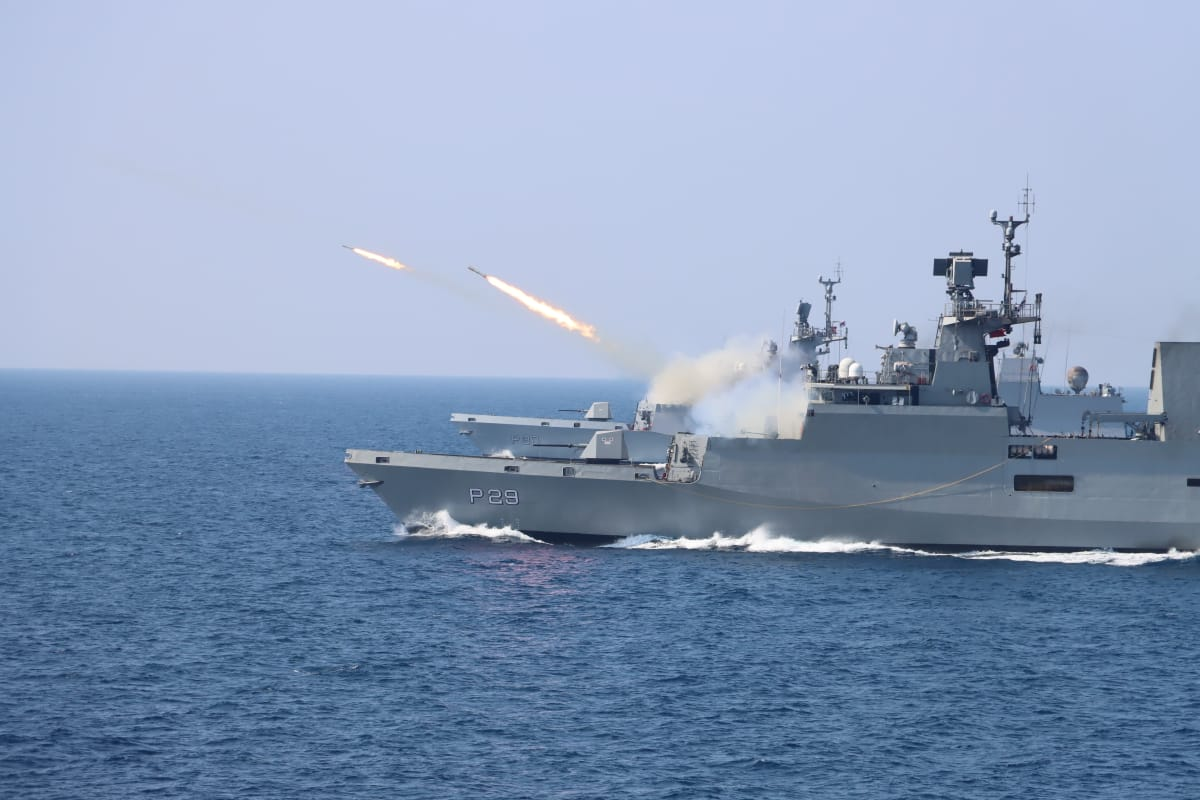
Kadmatt (foreground) and Kiltan during anti-submarine firing drills.

== See also ==
- INS Kavaratti
- INS Kiltan (P30)
- INS Kamorta (P28)
