= RMIS Lomor =

Marshall Islands patrol boat

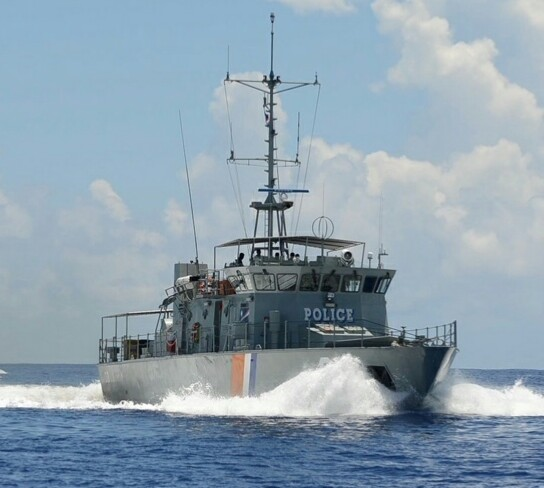
- Lomor on patrol, 3 July 2018

History

Marshall Islands
- Name: Lomor
- Operator: Marshall Islands
- Launched: 1991
- Identification: MMSI number: 538001380; Callsign: V7BW
- Status: Ship in active service

General characteristics
- Class & type: Pacific Forum-class patrol boat
- Displacement: 162 tons
- Length: 103 feet (31 m)

RMIS Lomor (03) is a Pacific Forum-class patrol boat operated by the Marshall Islands Sea Patrol. Lomor is one of twenty-two small patrol vessels Australia designed and built for smaller fellow members of the Pacific Forum, after the United Nations Convention on the Law of the Sea extended a 200-kilometre (108 nmi) exclusive economic zone for all maritime nations.

== Operational history ==
In 2006 the Lomor worked with the Greenpeace ship Esperanza on fishery patrol.

In September 2012 Lomor, working with the Australian Defence Force, and the United States Coast Guard, to help locate a mariner lost in Marshall Island waters.

In February 2018 Lomor and RKS Teanoai performed open ocean exercises and a joint patrol of their waters. In July Lomor engaged in joint exercises with the United States Coast Guard cutter Oliver F. Berry, a similar-sized vessel.
