= Law enforcement in Kiribati =

Police Force of Kiribati

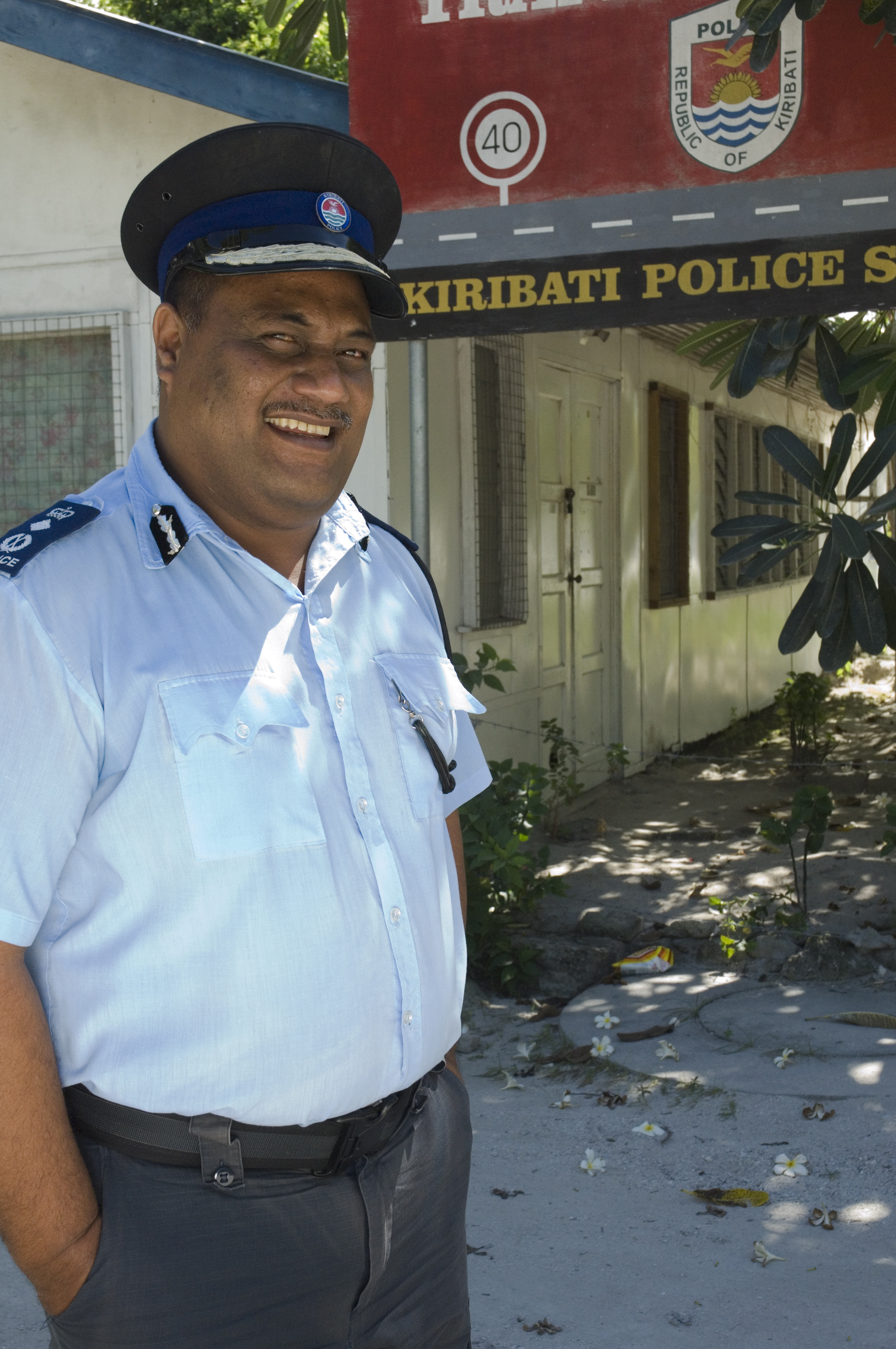
Ioeru Tokantetaake, i-Kiribati Commissioner of Police (2007)

The only State disciplined forces in Kiribati are a unified national police force, with prison and quarantine powers, and the coast guard. Defense assistance is provided by Australia and New Zealand. The police force does not report to any ministers but rather directly to the President of Kiribati.

== Organization ==
The Kiribati Police Service is an independent body with one police officer for every 222 people (total staff over 500 with strength approximately 458 sworn members). Ioeru Tokantetaake is the current Commissioner of Police (since 2004), and also presides over prisons in Kiribati.

== Arms ==
The Kiribati Police Service carry few weapons. Drill purpose rifles are used for drills, and some officers have been provided with AR-15 rifles.

== Ranks ==
- Constable
- Senior Constable/Corporal
- Sergeant
- Inspector
- Assistant Superintendent
- Superintendent
- Deputy Commissioner
- Commissioner

== Stations ==
There are police stations on every inhabited island in Kiribati. Key police posts include:

- Betio - also as headquarters for the police force
- London
- Bairiki- covers the area from Ambo village to Bairiki Village
- Bikenibeu - covers the area from Taborio village to Causeway village
- Bonriki - covers the area of Temwaiku and Bonriki village

== Maritime Police ==
The police operate the RKS Teanoai II, a Pacific class patrol boat provided to Kiribati by Australia in 2021 as part of the Pacific Maritime Security Program. The vessel is registered and stationed in Tarawa.

== Prisons ==
KPS is responsible for managing the prisons in Kiribati. There are 4 prisons in Kiribati with 3 for men and 1 for women. As of 2013, there are 141 persons detained in the system. Prison staff are members of the Kiribati Police Service.

There are two prisons in Kiribati:

- Walter Betio Prison in Betio
- Ronton (London) Prison on Kiritimati Island

== Emergency Services ==
Fire and rescue services are the responsibility of the KPS.

In 2012 Japan donated a chemical pumper to Kiribati to be stationed in Betio to replace the role of the fire truck at Bonriki International Airport on the other end of the island.

== Guard of Honour ==
Select members of the KPS are selected to protect the President and other dignitaries.
