= Vanuatu Police Force =

Vanuatu Police Force Ni-Vanuatu Polis
- Flag for Vanuatu Police Force

Jurisdictional structure
- Operations jurisdiction: Vanuatu
- General nature: Civilian police

Operational structure
- Headquarters: Port Vila
- Child agency: Vanuatu Mobile Forces

Website
- Official website

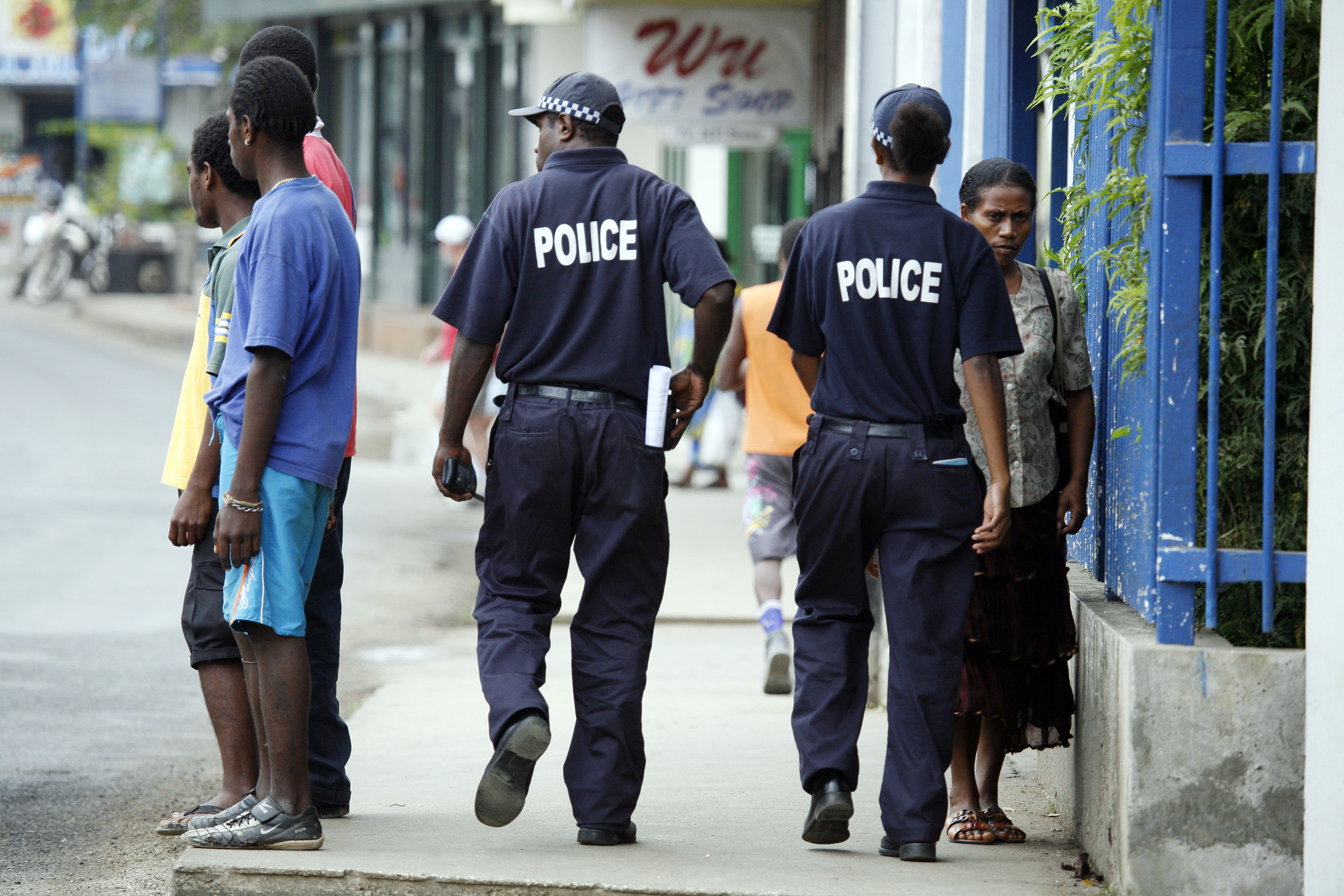
Constables patrol the streets of Port Vila

The Vanuatu Police Force (Bislama: Ni-Vanuatu Polis; VPF) is the national law enforcement of Vanuatu. The VPF is headquartered in Port Vila and has two specialised arms: a small para-military force, the Vanuatu Mobile Force, and a maritime force, the Vanuatu Police Maritime Wing.

== History ==
Vanuatu has provided police officers to the Regional Assistance Mission to Solomon Islands since July 2003. Ni-Vanuatu police officer Benson Samuels is contingent commander of the ni-Vanuatu police serving as part of RAMSI's Participating Police Force (PPF). In a 2006 interview Police Commissioner Lieutenant Colonel Lui Patu Navoko voiced support for the idea that Vanuatu would benefit from having a National Security Council.

== Organisation ==
=== Maritime Wing ===
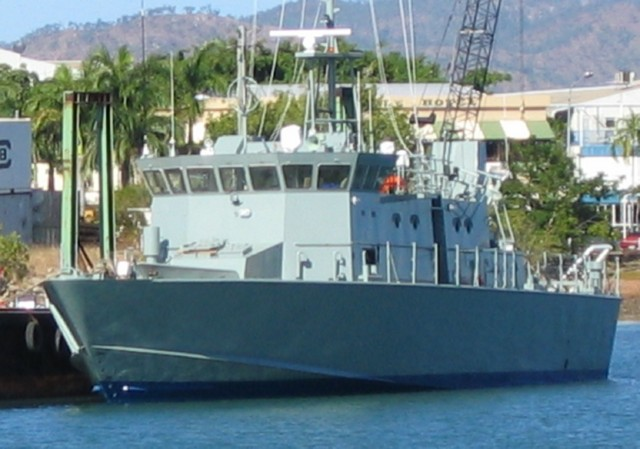
RVS Tukoro

The Vanuatu Police Maritime Wing currently operates a single Guardian-class patrol boat, RVS Takuare, as well as a variety of small craft including the Australian supplied RVS Mataweli. The Maritime wing primarily operates from RVS Mala outside of Port Vila, an Australian funded base which has a large wharf able to host both Australian and Ni-Vanuatu vessels. Until 2021 the wing operated a single Pacific Forum-class patrol boat, RVS Tukoro.

== Police Commissioners of Vanuatu ==
- Lieutenant Colonel Arthur Coulton (2002)
- Lui Patu Navoko (2002-29 September 2009)
- Lieutenant Joshua Bong (29 September 2009-October 2012)
- Arthur Caulton (October 2012-)

== See also ==
- Law of Vanuatu
