= Cabinet of Solomon Islands =

Executive branch of the government of Solomon Islands

The Cabinet of Solomon Islands is the cabinet (executive branch) of the government of Solomon Islands. Solomon Islands has a Westminster system of government.

== Current Cabinet ==
Cabinet as of June 2, 2026

Portfolio	Minister
Prime Minister	Matthew Wale
Deputy Prime Minister; Minister of Public Service	Francis Sade
Minister for Foreign Affairs and External Trade	Ricky Nelson Houenipwela
Minister for National Planning and Development Coordination	Peter Kenilorea Jr.
Minister for Home Affairs	Mannaseh Maelanga
Minister of Finance and Treasury	Rexon Annex Ramofafia
Minister of Communication and Aviation	Frederick Kologeto
Minister of Justice and Legal Affairs	Alfred Tuasulia
Minister of Education and Human Resources Development	Stephen Kumi
Minister of Health and Medical Services	Morris Toiraena
Minister of Commerce, Industry, Labour, and Immigration	Harry Kuma
Minister of Police, National Security, and Correctional Services	John Tuhaika Jr.
Minister of Culture and Tourism	James Bonunga
Minister of Agriculture and Livestock	Franklyn Derek Wasi
Minister of Lands, Housing, and Survey	Oliver Salopuka
Minister of Infrastructure Development	Ricky Fuo’o
Minister of Forestry and Research	Makario Tagini
Minister of Fisheries and Marine Resources	Polycarp Paea
Minister of Women, Youth, Children, and Family Affairs	John Maneniaru
Minister of Rural Development	Daniel Waneoroa
Minister of Environment, Climate Change, Disaster Management, and Meteorology	Wayne Ghemu
Minister of Traditional Governance, Peace, and Ecclesiastical Affairs	George Temahua
Minister of Mines, Energy, and Rural Electrification	Derick Rawcliff Manu'ari
Minister of Provincial Government and Institutional Strengthening	Alfred Lazarus Rinah
