= Outline of Solomon Islands =

Island country in the South Pacific Ocean

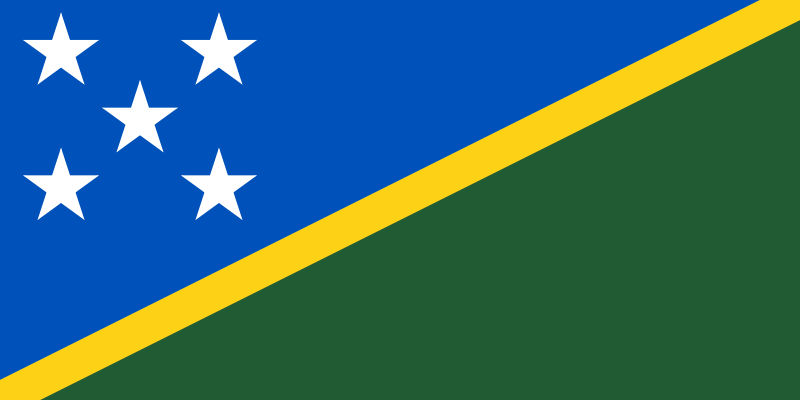
Flag

Coat of arms

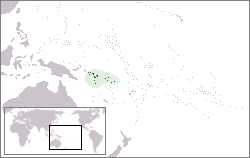
The location of Solomon Islands

The following outline is provided as an overview of and topical guide to Solomon Islands:

Solomon Islands is a sovereign Melanesian island country located in the South Pacific Ocean, south-east of Papua New Guinea. The country is composed of nearly one thousand islands of the Solomon Islands archipelago, which cover a total land area of 27,540 square kilometres (10,630 mi^{2}). The capital is Honiara, located on the island of Guadalcanal.

The Solomon Islands archipelago is believed to have been inhabited by Melanesian people for thousands of years. Some of the most bitter fighting of World War II occurred in the Solomon Islands campaign of 1942–45, including the Battle of Guadalcanal. Self-government was achieved in 1976 and independence two years later. The country is a Commonwealth realm.

The historical North Solomon Islands covered Bougainville Island, Choiseul, Santa Isabel, the Shortlands and Ontong Java and were largely under German control until 1900. The southern Solomon Islands, which included Guadalcanal, the Nggelas, Gizo, Kolombangara, Marovo Island, Mborokua, New Georgia, Vella Lavella, Vangunu, Rennell, Bellona, Makira, Malaita, Temotu and a number of associated smaller islands were under British control and in 1893 became the British Solomon Islands Protectorate. In 1945, Bougainville, and some associated minor islands, were transferred away from the protectorate to Australian administration and then in 1970 became a part of Papua New Guinea. The remainder stayed under the protectorate until independence in 1978 at which point they were officially named Solomon Islands. All of the north and south Solomon Islands taken together are generally referred to as the Solomon Islands to distinguish them from the nation state of Solomon Islands.

Since 1998, ethnic violence, government misconduct, and crime have undermined stability and civil society. In June 2003 an Australian-led "multinational" force, the Regional Assistance Mission to Solomon Islands (RAMSI), arrived to restore peace and disarm ethnic militias.

== General reference ==
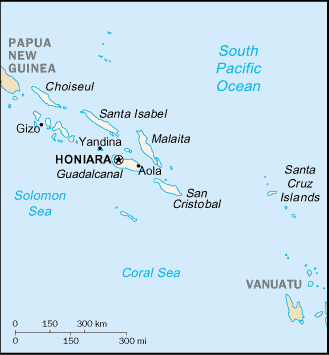
The whole of Solomon Islands, click to enlarge

- Pronunciation: /ˈsɒ.lə.mən ˈɑɪ.lɘnds/
- Common English country name: Solomon Islands
- Official English country name: Solomon Islands
- Common endonym(s):
- Official endonym(s):
- Adjectival(s): Solomon Island
- Demonym(s): Solomon Islander
- Etymology: Name of Solomon Islands
- ISO country codes: SB, SLB, 090
- ISO region codes: See ISO 3166-2:SB
- Internet country code top-level domain: .sb

== Geography of Solomon Islands ==
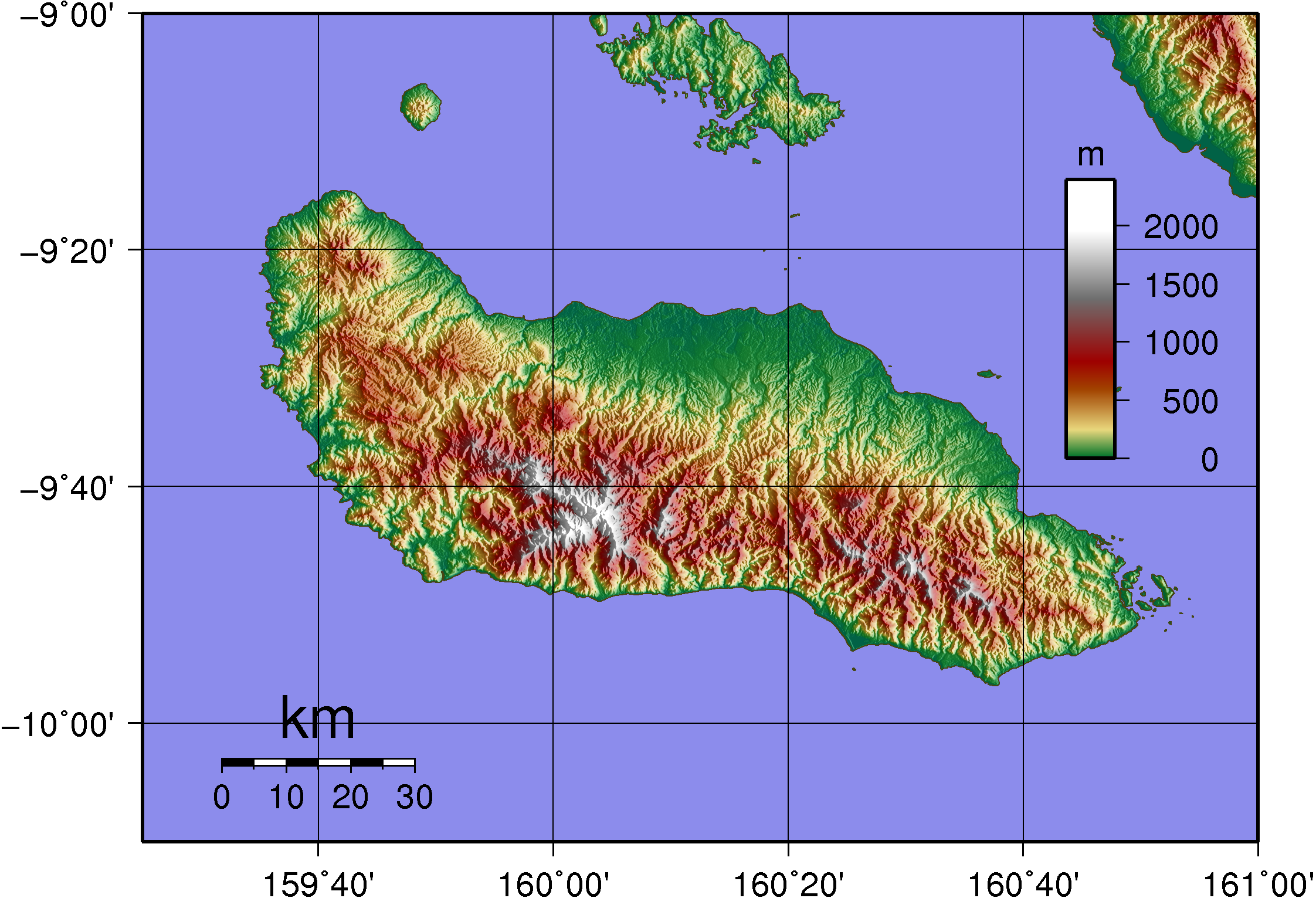
Topographical map of the island of Guadalcanal, click to enlarge

The term the Solomon Islands refers to the group of islands that includes the islands of the nation state Solomon Islands but also other islands such as Bougainville, a province of Papua New Guinea. The Solomon Islands was the name given to this wider group of geographical islands by the British administration up to the independence of Solomon Islands in 1978; this article concerns itself with the political entity, the nation state of Solomon Islands.

- Solomon Islands is...
  - a country
    - an island country
    - a nation state
    - a Commonwealth realm
    - consists of an archipelago
- Location:
  - Southern Hemisphere and Eastern Hemisphere
  - Pacific Ocean
    - South Pacific Ocean
      - Oceania
        - Melanesia
  - Time zone: UTC+11
  - Extreme points of Solomon Islands
    - High: Mount Popomanaseu on Guadalcanal 2,335 m (7,661 ft)
    - Low: South Pacific Ocean 0 m
  - Land boundaries: none
  - Coastline: South Pacific Ocean 5,313 km
- Population of Solomon Islands:
- Area of Solomon Islands:
- Atlas of Solomon Islands

=== Environment of Solomon Islands ===
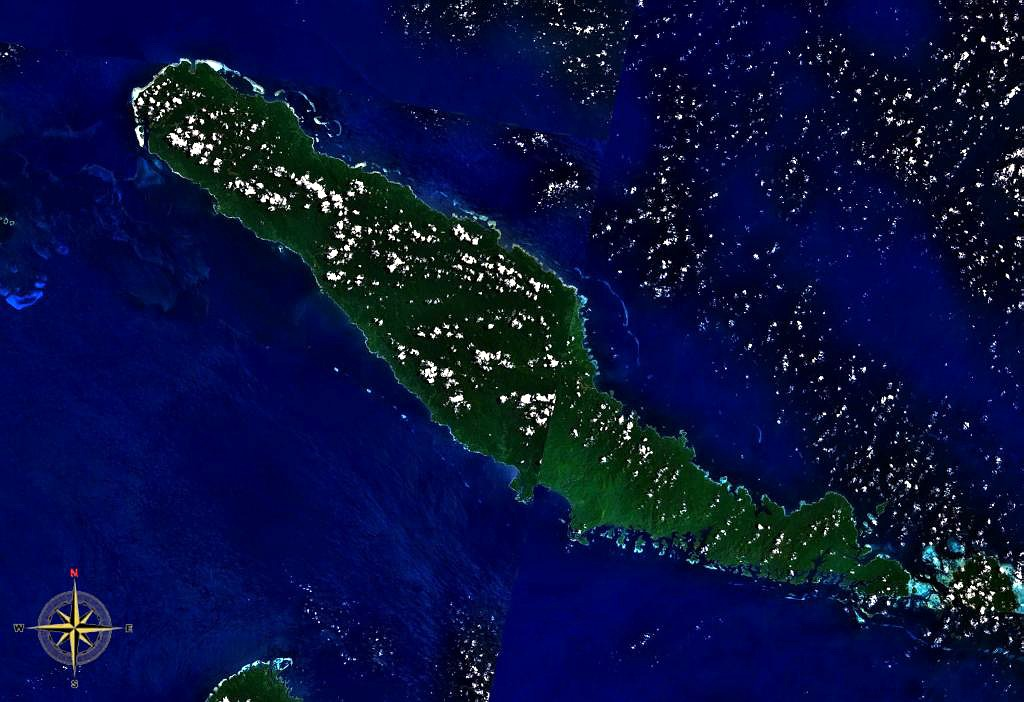
An enlargeable satellite image of Choiseul Island

- Renewable energy in Solomon Islands
- Protected areas of Solomon Islands
- Wildlife of the Solomon Islands archipelago
  - Birds of the Solomon Islands archipelago
  - Mammals of the Solomon Islands archipelago

==== Natural geographic features of Solomon Islands ====
- Islands of Solomon Islands
- Lakes of Solomon Islands
- Volcanoes in Solomon Islands
- World Heritage Sites in Solomon Islands

==== Ecoregions of Solomon Islands ====
- List of ecoregions in Solomon Islands

==== Administrative divisions of Solomon Islands ====
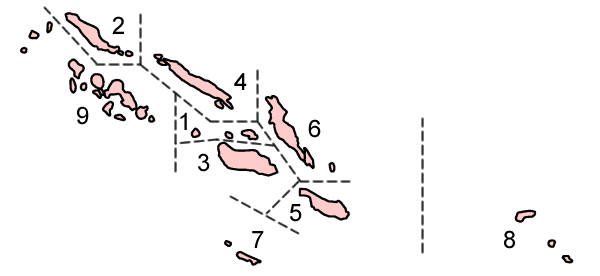
Provinces of Solomon Islands, numbered in alphabetical order.

Provinces of Solomon Islands

- Central
- Choiseul
- Guadalcanal
- Isabel
- Makira-Ulawa
- Malaita
- Rennell and Bellona
- Temotu
- Western

=== Demography of Solomon Islands ===
- Demographics of Solomon Islands

== Government and politics of Solomon Islands ==
Politics of Solomon Islands

- Form of government: parliamentary monarchy (Commonwealth realm)
- Capital of Solomon Islands: Honiara
- Elections in Solomon Islands
- Political parties in Solomon Islands

=== Branches of the government of Solomon Islands ===
- Government of Solomon Islands
- National Parliament of Solomon Islands

==== Executive branch of the government of Solomon Islands ====
- Head of state: King of Solomon Islands, Charles III
  - Governor General of Solomon Islands, David Tiva Kapu
- Head of government: Prime Minister of Solomon Islands, Matthew Wale
- Deputy Prime Minister of Solomon Islands
- Cabinet of Solomon Islands

==== Legislative branch of the government of Solomon Islands ====
- National Parliament of Solomon Islands (unicameral)

==== Judicial branch of the government of Solomon Islands ====
- Court system of Solomon Islands
- Court of Appeal (supreme court)

=== Foreign relations of Solomon Islands ===
- Foreign relations of Solomon Islands
- Diplomatic missions in Solomon Islands
- Diplomatic missions of Solomon Islands

==== International organisation membership ====
The Government of Solomon Islands is a member of:

- African, Caribbean, and Pacific Group of States (ACP)
- Asian Development Bank (ADB)
- Commonwealth of Nations
- Economic and Social Commission for Asia and the Pacific (ESCAP)
- Food and Agriculture Organization (FAO)
- Group of 77 (G77)
- International Bank for Reconstruction and Development (IBRD)
- International Civil Aviation Organization (ICAO)
- International Criminal Court (ICCt) (signatory)
- International Development Association (IDA)
- International Federation of Red Cross and Red Crescent Societies (IFRCS)
- International Finance Corporation (IFC)
- International Fund for Agricultural Development (IFAD)
- International Labour Organization (ILO)
- International Maritime Organization (IMO)
- International Monetary Fund (IMF)
- International Olympic Committee (IOC)
- International Red Cross and Red Crescent Movement (ICRM)
- International Telecommunication Union (ITU)
- Multilateral Investment Guarantee Agency (MIGA)
- Organisation for the Prohibition of Chemical Weapons (OPCW)
- Pacific Islands Forum (PIF)
- Secretariat of the Pacific Community (SPC)
- South Pacific Regional Trade and Economic Cooperation Agreement (Sparteca)
- United Nations (UN)
- United Nations Conference on Trade and Development (UNCTAD)
- United Nations Educational, Scientific, and Cultural Organization (UNESCO)
- Universal Postal Union (UPU)
- World Health Organization (WHO)
- World Meteorological Organization (WMO)
- World Trade Organization (WTO)

=== Law and order in Solomon Islands ===
- Constitution of Solomon Islands
- Human rights in Solomon Islands
  - LGBT rights in Solomon Islands
- Law enforcement in Solomon Islands

=== Military of Solomon Islands ===
- Military of Solomon Islands

There is no military in Solomon Islands.

=== Local government in Solomon Islands ===
Government of Solomon Islands

== Culture of Solomon Islands ==
- Cuisine of the Solomon Islands
- Languages of the Solomon Islands
- National symbols of Solomon Islands
  - Coat of arms of the Solomon Islands
  - Flag of the Solomon Islands
  - National anthem of the Solomon Islands
- People of Solomon Islands
- Public holidays in the Solomon Islands
- Religion in the Solomon Islands
  - Christianity in Solomon Islands
  - Islam in the Solomon Islands
- World Heritage Sites in Solomon Islands

=== Art in Solomon Islands ===
- Music of the Solomon Islands

=== Sports in Solomon Islands ===
- Sport in the Solomon Islands
- Football in Solomon Islands

== Economy and infrastructure of Solomon Islands ==
- Economic rank, by nominal GDP (2007): 181st (one hundred and eighty first)
- Agriculture in Solomon Islands
  - National Bank of Solomon Islands
  - Internet in the Solomon Islands
- Currency of the Solomon Islands: Dollar
  - ISO 4217: SBD
- Tourism in Solomon Islands
- Transport in Solomon Islands
- Airports in Solomon Islands

== Education in Solomon Islands ==
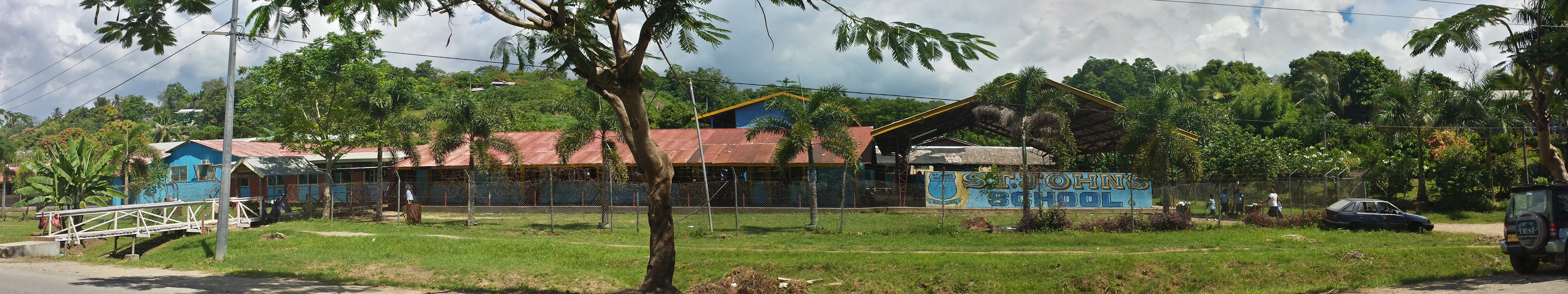
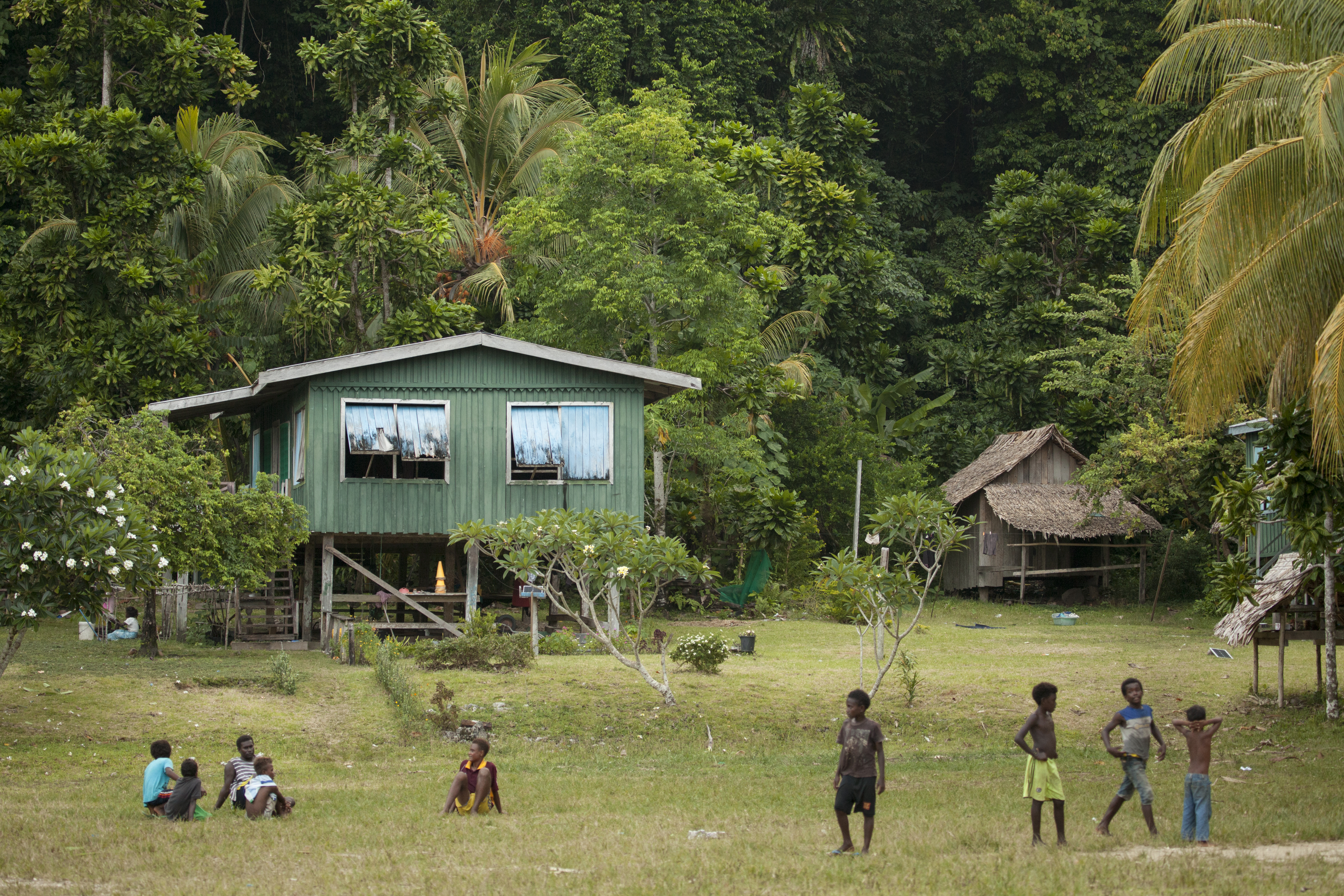
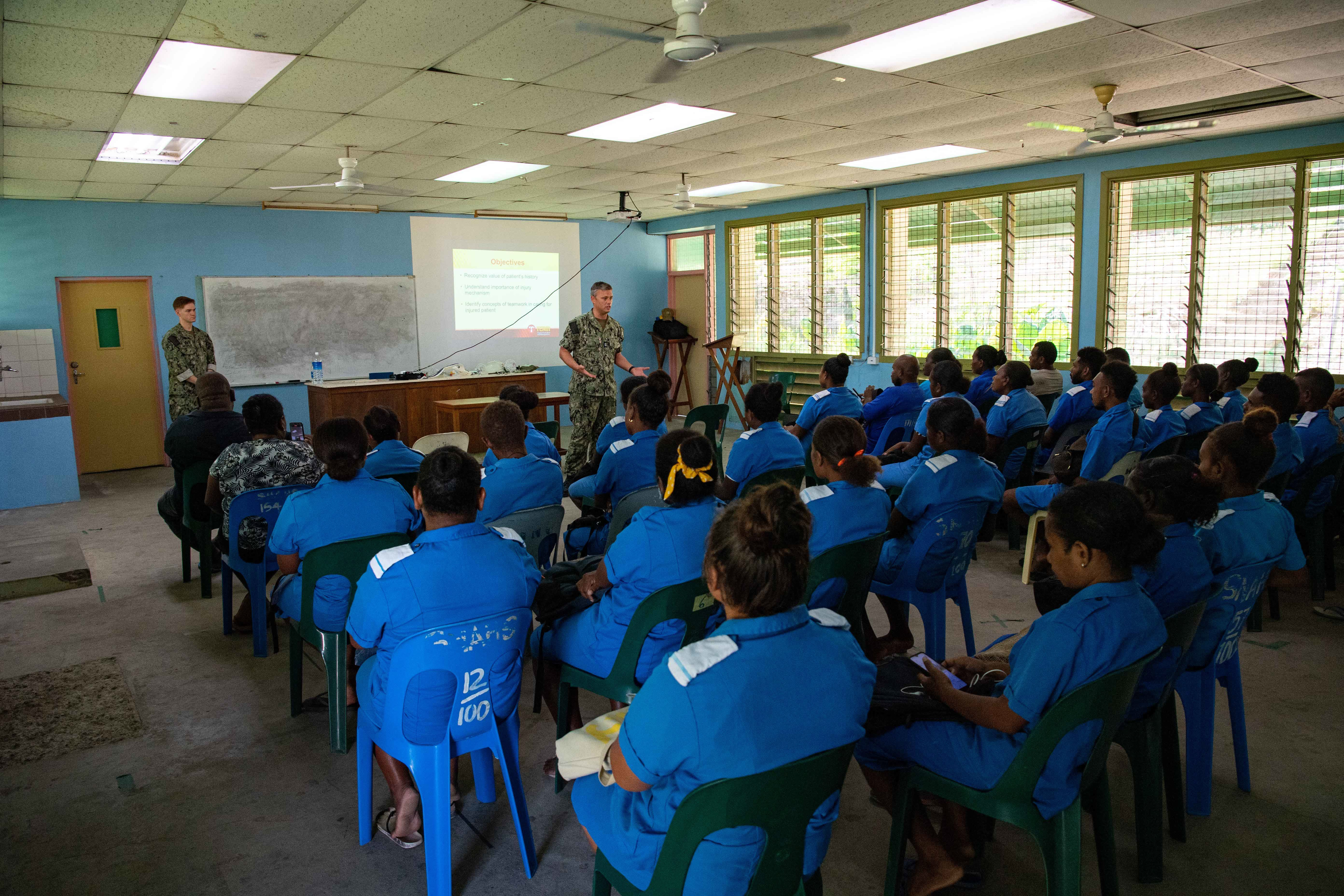

== See also ==
- List of international rankings
- Member state of the Commonwealth of Nations
- Member state of the United Nations
- Outline of geography
- Outline of Oceania
- Solomon Islands
