= Karen Barimata Galokale =

Permanent Secretary of MPNSCS in Solomon Islands

- In office 2017–2026

Personal details
- Spouse: Tome Faisi

Karen Barimata Galokale (born 29 May 1978) previously served as the Permanent Secretary of Ministry of Police, National Security and Correctional Services (MPNSCS) in Solomon Islands until her dismissal in June 2026. She is a lawyer by profession and has spent the majority of her career in the public service across multiple departments.

== Early life and education ==
Karen Galokale was born in Gizo, Solomon Islands and is part Marovo and Choiseul. She graduated from Betikama Adventist College in 1996 and then she attended Solomon Islands College of Higher Education.

Galokale attended the University of South Pacific (USP) in Fiji and graduated with Bachelor's degree in Law. She also graduated from USP with a professional diploma in legal practice.

In 2008, she undertook the Indian Technical & Economic Cooperation (ITEC) Program studying the International Training Programme in Legislative Drafting (LD) at the Bureau of Parliamentary Studies and Training.

In 2015, she completed a Masters of Development Policy at the Korean Development Institute. During this time, she produced a thesis which explored the adoption of a public-private partnership model in education for equitable access to primary education in the Solomon Islands.

== Personal life ==
Galokale has one son from a previous relationship with her ni-Vanuatu school mate. She shares Choiseul wantok ties to former Prime Minister Manasseh Sogavare. Galokale has been in a relationship with Royal Solomon Islands Police Force (RSIPF) officer Tome Faisi since 2021.

== Career ==
Early in her career Galokale worked as a Legal Assistant at the Development Bank of Solomon Islands.

She later moved to the Office of the Prime Minister and Cabinet (OPMC) where she worked as a legal officer. She subsequently served in a number of senior positions, including as the Assistant Secretary to Cabinet and as Deputy Secretary to Cabinet.

In August 2017, she changed departments and was appointed Permanent Secretary of the Ministry of Police, National Security and Correctional Services. In 2021, she was re-appointed to this position.

During her career as Permanent Secretary of MPNSCS, Galokale has advocated for the inclusion of women in the justice sector and has contributed to initiatives for reform on gender, power relations and violence against women.

In October 2025, Galokale was reappointed as Permanent Secretary of the MPNSCS.

In June 2026, Galokale was terminated as Permanent Secretary of the MPNSCS.

=== Controversies ===
In 2022, Galokale was investigated by the Solomon Islands Leadership Code Commission for misconduct in office. It was alleged that she had been having an extramarital affair with subordinate RSIPF officer Tome Faisi.

In December 2024, Galokale was quoted in an article stating that "unlike the previous government" the Solomon Islands Prime Minister Jeremiah Manele and Deputy Prime Minister Bradley Tovosia were "weak" and "afraid to make tough choices".

In May 2025, Galokale's quotes reappeared when former Prime Minister Manasseh Sogavare lead a motion of no confidence against Prime Minister Manele using similar worded statements. This led to allegations that Galokale may have supported Sogavare's attempt to remove PM Manele, which Galokale later denied.
