= Melchior Mataki =

Solomon Islands civil servants

Secretary to the Prime Minister (SPM)
- Incumbent
- Assumed office 2025

Melchior Mataki is the current Secretary to the Prime Minister (SPM) in the Solomon Islands. He is an environmental scientist who specialises in waste management, climate change and disaster risk management in the Pacific.

He previously served as the Permanent Secretary for the Ministry of National Planning and Developmental Coordination.

== Education ==
Mataki holds an Undergraduate Degree in chemistry and mathematics from the University of the South Pacific (USP). He also holds a master's degree in analytical chemistry from USP, and a PhD in Environmental Science from Murdoch University.

== Career ==
Mataki previously served as Programme Manager at the Pacific Centre for Environmental Development at USP.

In July 2013, Mataki was appointed Permanent Secretary for the Ministry of Environment, Climate Change, Disaster Management and Meteorology. He held this position until May 2024, when he was sworn in as Permanent Secretary for the Ministry of National Planning and Developmental Coordination.

In 2025, it was announced that Mataki would be replacing Sir Jimmie Rodgers as SPM.
