= Tome Faisi =

Solomon Islands international footballer

Personal information
- Full name: Tome Faisi
- Date of birth: 21 January 1982 (age 44)
- Place of birth: Solomon Islands
- Position: Defender

Team information
- Current team: Malaita Kingz
- Number: 4

Youth career
- –2007: Marist FC

Senior career*
Years	Team	Apps	(Gls)
2007–2008	Marist		
2008–2011	Kossa		
2012	Solomon Warriors		
2013	X-Beam		
2014–2017	Western United		
2017–	Malaita Kingz		

International career^{‡}
2007–	Solomon Islands	17	(1)
Medal record
Men's football
Representing Solomon Islands
Pacific Games
Silver medal – second place	2011 New Caledonia
- * Club domestic league appearances and goals as of 5 January 2014 ‡ National team caps and goals as of 5 January 2014

Tome Faisi (born 21 January 1982) is a Solomon Islands international footballer who plays as a defender. He played at the 2012 OFC Nations Cup.

Tome currently serves as a RSIPF officer and is in a relationship with Karen Galokale, Permanent Secretary of the Ministry of Police, National Security and Correction Services in the Solomon Islands.

== Honours ==
Solomon Islands

- Pacific Games: Silver Medalist, 2011
