= Ministry of Infrastructure Development (Solomon Islands) =

One of the ministries of the Solomon Islands Government

Agency overview
- Jurisdiction: Government of Solomon Islands
- Minister responsible: Ricky Fuo'o, Minister of Infrastructure Development
- Agency executive: Allan Lilia, Permanent Secretary of the Ministry of Infrastructure Development
- Website: https://solomons.gov.sb/ministry-of-infrastructure-development/

The Ministry of Infrastructure Development (MID) is one of the ministries of the Solomon Islands Government.

The ministry delivers government services to manage the development of public roads, wharves, airstrips and structures in Solomon Islands. MID also works to make sure infrastructure and transport systems comply with government regulations.

== Organisation ==
MID consists of five departments:

- Corporate Support Services Department
- Architecture Building Management Services Department
- Mechanical Works Services Department
- Transport Infrastructure Management Services Department
- Solomon Islands Maritime Safety Administration Department
