= Riley Mesepitu =

Government official in the Solomon Islands

Riley Henao Mesepitu

Permanent Secretary for the Ministry of Commerce, Industries, Labour and Immigration
- Incumbent
- Assumed office 2017

Riley Henao Mesepitu is the current permanent secretary for the Ministry of Commerce, Industries, Labour and Immigration (MCILI) in Solomon Islands.

== Education ==
Mesepitu holds a Bachelor's degree in Management/Public Administration and Economics from the University of South Pacific. He also holds a Master's degree in Business Administration from the University of Waikato in New Zealand.

== Career ==
Mesepitu previously worked as the former General Manager of Solomon Islands Small Business Enterprise (SISBEC) and Human Resource Executive of Solomon Mutual Insurance Limited.

He previously served as the Under Secretary, Director of Industry Development and Director Industry Development Division in the same Ministry.

In the 2014 National General Election, Mesepitu was a candidate for the East Honiara constituency with the National Transformation Party. Mesepitu received 1,169 votes but lost to Independent candidate Douglas Ete.

In 2017, Mesepitu was appointed Permanent Secretary for the MCILI. He was subsequently reappointed as Permanent Secretary in August 2021.

As Permanent Secretary, Mesepitu has spearheaded reforms which seek to improve e-commerce access for small to medium businesses, and has also sought to make it easier for communities, youth groups, women and tribes to form business entities within Solomon Islands.

Mesepitu also currently serves on the board of directors at Our Telekom, a prominent telecommunication provider in the Solomon Islands.

In October 2025, Mesepitu was reappointed as Permanent Secretary for the MCILI.
