= RSIPV Gizo =

Guardian-class patrol boat

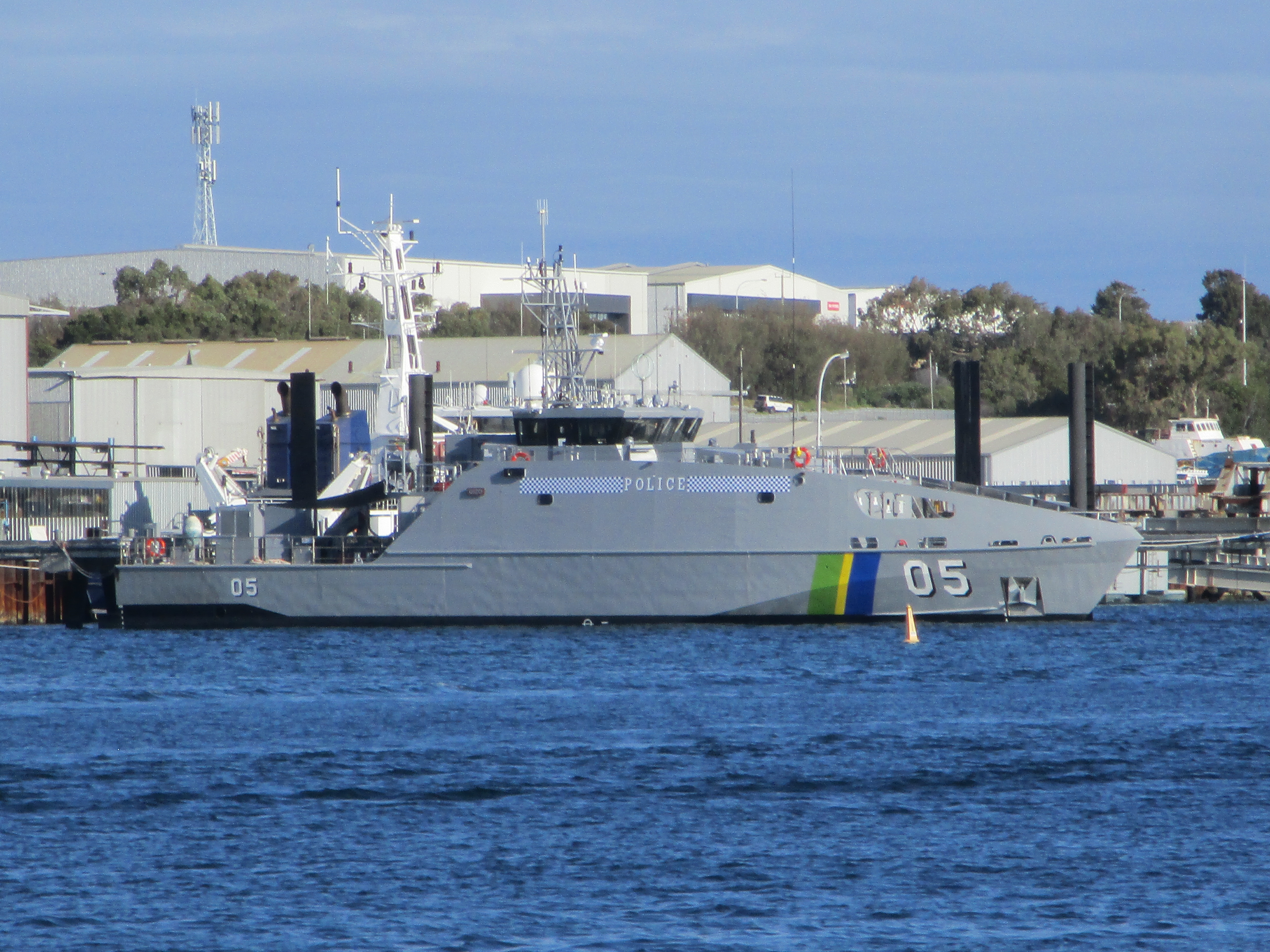
- Gizo in the Austal shipyards in Henderson, Western Australia.

History

Solomon Islands
- Namesake: Gizo
- Operator: Royal Solomon Islands Police Force
- Yard number: 525
- Acquired: 8 November 2019
- Commissioned: 19 December 2019
- Home port: Aola Base, Point Cruz (Honiara)
- Identification: Call sign: H4ZL; IMO number: 4734142; MMSI number: 557009200; Pennant number: 05
- Status: In service

General characteristics
- Type: Patrol boat
- Length: 39.5 m (129 ft 7 in)
- Beam: 8 m (26 ft 3 in)
- Draught: 2.5 m (8 ft 2 in)
- Propulsion: 2 × Caterpillar 3516C diesels, 2 shafts
- Speed: 20 knots (37 km/h; 23 mph)
- Range: 3,000 nmi (5,600 km; 3,500 mi) at 12 knots (22 km/h; 14 mph)
- Complement: 23
- Sensors & processing systems: X-band radar; differential GPS; gyrocompass; depth sounding machine; Electronic Chart Display and Information System; autopilot

RSIPV Gizo (05) is a Guardian-class patrol boat in service with the Royal Solomon Islands Police Force Maritime Department. She was the fifth boat of her class to be completed. Australian officials officially handed her over to representatives of the Solomon Islands on 8 November 2019, at the Austal shipyard in Henderson, Western Australia.

She is the first of two Guardian-class vessels that Australia provided to the Solomon Islands, and replaced RSIPV Lata. Her sister ship is RSIPV Taro.

== Background ==
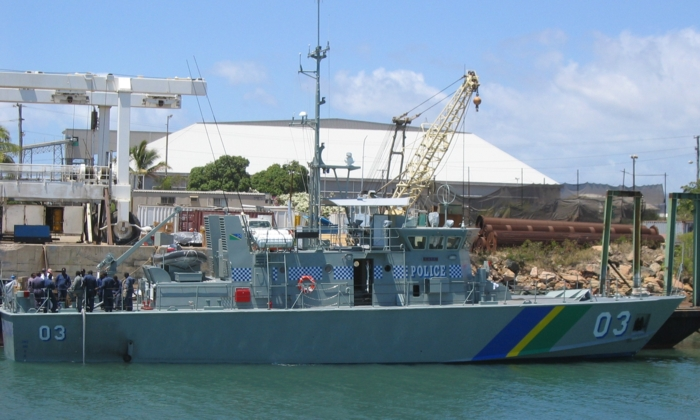
Pacific class RSIPV Lata

Following the 1982 United Nations Convention on the Law of the Sea extending the maritime nations' exclusive economic zones (EEZ) to 200 kilometres (108 nmi), the Pacific Islands nations found themselves in need of capable yet economical vessels to patrol their EEZs.

In an effort to improve regional maritime security as well as diplomatic relations with the island states, the Australian government launched the Pacific Patrol Boat Program in 1983, in which they would build and gift 22 Pacific-class patrol boats to 12 Pacific Island nations over the next 14 years. The patrol boats were built with commercial off-the-shelf-components in order to ease maintenance costs for the island nations. Australia remained involved with maintaining the class for the next three decades, with a refit after 15 years of operation.

The Royal Solomon Islands Police Force received RSIPV Lata in 1988 and her sister ship RSIPV Auki in 1991, and would operate both for the next three decades. During a period of ethnic violence, Lata was reportedly commandeered by rebels in June 2000, and used to bombard the capital Honiara. Lata was decommissioned in Honiara on 11 September 2019, before RSIPV Gizo was delivered in December.

The Australian government announced the Pacific Patrol Boat Replacement Project on 17 June 2014. A contract for the construction of at least 19 boats and an initial seven-year maintenance and support period was signed with Austal on 4 May 2016. The keel of the first vessel was laid on 30 July 2017, before she was launched on 30 May 2018.

== Design ==
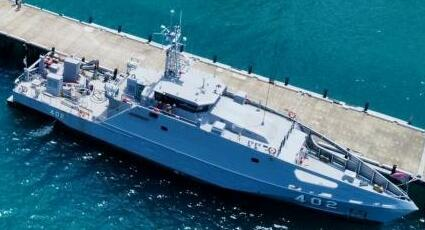
Aerial view of HMPNGS Rochus Lokinap moored at Manus, Papua New Guinea, on 14 August 2022 (Photo by US Coast Guard)

The Guardian class uses a steel monohull design based on that of the Bay class, which had been in service with the Australian Border Force since 1999. The patrol boats are 39.5 metres (129 ft 7 in) long with two habitable internal decks below the bridge. They are capable of traveling 3,000 nautical miles (5,600 km; 3,500 mi) at 12 knots (22 km/h; 14 mph), and have a maximum speed of 20 knots (37 km/h; 23 mph). They have two Caterpillar 3516C 2,000-kilowatt (2,700 hp) diesel engines powering two fixed-pitch propellers. A key design goal being ease of maintenance to accommodate small and isolated shipyards, the class uses commercial off-the-shelf components. They are slightly larger and more capable than the Pacific class.

In addition to the commanding officer's quarters, the boats have seven living quarters designed to berth 20 crew members. Three of them are staterooms that have their own showers in order to accommodate a mixed-sex crew. They also have a sick bay with a separate ventilation system, which during normal operations is used as two berths, bringing the total complement up to 23.

The vessels have a stern launching ramp for a WRH635 fast rescue boat. These are SOLAS-certified rigid-hulled inflatable boats designed to carry up to 15 persons. They are 6.35 metres (20 ft 10 in) long, with two Yamaha 67 kW (90 hp) outboard motors and an operational weight of 2,612.5 kilograms (5,760 lb). The stern is also equipped with a port side crane serving a 16-square-metre (170 sq ft) cargo deck.

Australia instructed that the boats would be delivered without armament, but they were designed to be capable of mounting an autocannon of up to 30 millimetres (1.2 in) on their foredeck, and a 0.50-calibre machine gun both port and starboard in front of the bridge.

In June 2022, three design flaws were reported in the media. This included cracking in the coupling between the engine and the gear box, the sick bay ventilation system recirculating air and an exhaust leak causing carbon monoxide to enter the normally non-crewed engine compartment.

== Role ==
According to Mostyn Mangau Solomon Islands Deputy Commissioner of Police: "This new boat is purposely to conduct maritime surveillance and enforcement operations like fighting illegal fishing, search and rescue for distress boats, VIP escorts and other border operations."

== Operational career ==
Gizo was officially commissioned on 19 December 2019. VIPs attending the commissioning included Prime Minister Manasseh Sogavare, Minister of Police, National Security and Correctional Services Anthony Veke and Australian High Commissioner Sally Anne Vincent. Acting Police Commissioner Mostyn Mangau called Gizo "the pride of the fleet". Gizo was joined by HMAS Maryborough on her maiden voyage. The crews of the two vessels conducted joint training exercises on the voyage.
