= Cheka (disambiguation) =

Cheka was the first Soviet secret police organization. Cheka may also refer to:

- Cheka (surname)
- Cheka (state constituency) in Malaysia
- Ulu Cheka, a village in Malaysia
