= Ministry of Commerce, Industry, Labour and Immigration =

Agency overview
- Jurisdiction: Government of Solomon Islands
- Headquarters: Honiara, Solomon Islands
- Minister responsible: Harry Kuma, Minister of Commerce, Industry, Labour & Immigration
- Agency executive: Riley Mesepitu, Permanent Secretary for the Ministry of Commerce, Industries, Labour and Immigration
- Website: https://solomons.gov.sb/ministry-of-commerce-industry-labour-and-immigration/

The Ministry of Commerce, Industry, Labour and Immigration (MCILI) is one of the ministries of the Solomon Islands Government.

The ministry delivers government services for the economic development and national security of Solomon Islands including Commerce, Industry, Labour, Immigration, Consumer Affairs and Price Control, Foreign Investment, trade development and business registration.

== Organisation ==
MCILI consists of the following divisions:

- Immigration
- Corporate Services
- Trade Disputes Panel
- Company Haus
- Consumer Affairs & Price Control
- Marketing & Export Promotion
- Foreign Investment
- Business & Cooperatives
- Industrial Development
- Labour
