= Ministry of Communication and Aviation =

Ministry in the Solomon Islands government

Agency overview
- Jurisdiction: Government of Solomon Islands
- Headquarters: Honiara, Solomon Islands
- Minister responsible: Frederick Kologeto, Minister of Communication and Aviation
- Agency executive: Alwyn Danitofea, Permanent Secretary of the Ministry of Communication and Aviation

The Ministry of Communication and Aviation is one of the ministries of the Solomon Islands Government.

The ministry delivers services for aviation and communications including ICT at the national level. The ministry also works to undertake infrastructure upgrades and development for the aviation sector.

== Organisation ==
The ministry consists of the following Divisions:

- Corporate Services
- Airport Management
- Air Traffic Services
- Aviation Security Services
- Technical Services
- Information Communication Technology Services
