= Stephen Kumi =

Solomonese politician

Minister of Education and Resources Development
- Incumbent
- Assumed office May 2026

Stephen Kumi is the current minister for Education and Human Resources Development in Solomon Islands. He has previously held a senior position within Solomon Islands Government as Minister for Traditional Governance Peace and Ecclesiastical Affairs and is the current member of Parliament for Temotu Nende.

== Career ==
Early in his career Kumi worked as a teacher, an education administrator and as a Chief Education Officer for the Temotu Provincial Education Provider.

In April 2024, he was elected to the Temotu Nende constituency in the Solomon Islands General Election.

In February 2026, he was sworn in as Minister for Traditional Governance Peace and Ecclesiastical Affairs.

In May 2026, Kumi was sworn in as Minister for Education and Human Resources Development.
