= Ministry of Women, Youth, Children, and Family Affairs (Solomon Islands) =

Agency overview
- Jurisdiction: Government of Solomon Islands
- Headquarters: Honiara, Solomon Islands
- Minister responsible: John Maneniaru, Minister of Women, Youth, Children and Family Affairs
- Agency executive: Cedric Alependava, Permanent Secretary of Ministry of Women, Youth, Children and Family Affairs
- Website: https://solomons.gov.sb/ministry-of-women-youth-children-family-affairs/

The Ministry of Women, Youth, Children, and Family Affairs (MWYCFA) is one of the ministries of the Solomon Islands Government.

The ministry delivers government services to reduce violence against women and enhance gender equality. MWYCFA also works to create programs which promote the development of Solomon Islands youths to reach their full potential.

== Organisation ==
MWYCFA consists of the following divisions:

- Corporate Services
- Research, Policy, Planning and Information
- Women's Development
- Youth Development
- Children's Development
- Family Affairs
