= Francis Sade =

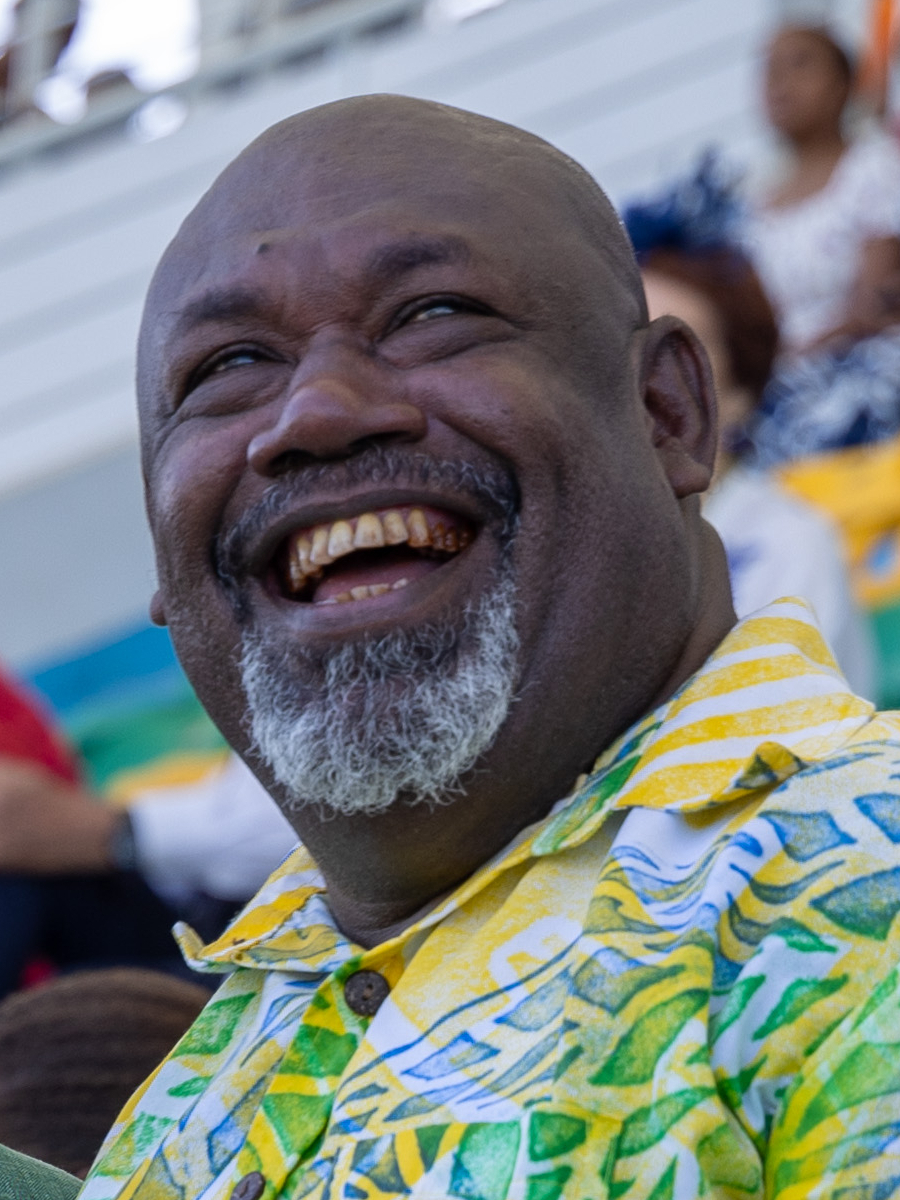
- Sade celebrating Solomon Islands Independence Day in 2026

Deputy Prime Minister of Solomon Islands
- Incumbent
- Assumed office 16 May 2026
- Prime Minister: Matthew Wale
- Preceded by: Manasseh Sogavare

Minister of Public Service
- Incumbent
- Assumed office 15 December 2024
- Prime Minister: Jeremiah Manele; Matthew Wale
- Preceded by: John Tuhaika

Francis Motcho Belande Sade is the current Minister for Public Service (MPS) in Solomon Islands. He has held several senior positions within Solomon Islands government as well as the provincial assembly of Guadalcanal Province and is the current Member of Parliament for Northwest Guadalcanal. As of May 16, 2026, Sade has been sworn in as Deputy Prime Minister of the Solomon Islands.

== Early life and education ==
Sade attended the Fiji School of Medicine from 1993-1997 and holds a Diploma in Health Inspection and Environment Health.

== Career ==
Early in his career Sade worked for World Vision International overseeing the implementation of rural water supply projects. In 2011, Sade moved to the Solomon Islands Rural Development Program.

In 2010 and 2014, he ran for the Northwest Guadalcanal constituency in the Solomon Islands General Election.

In June 2019, Sade was elected premier of Guadalcanal Provincial government. He later became the first premier of Guadalcanal Province to hold that office for a full term of four years since 1985.

He was appointed Deputy Speaker of Solomon Islands National Parliament in June 2024. In December 2024, Sade was sworn in as Minister for Public Service.
