= Ministry of Agriculture and Livestock (Solomon Islands) =

Agency overview
- Jurisdiction: Government of Solomon Islands
- Minister responsible: Franklyn Derek Wasi, Minister of Agriculture and Livestock
- Agency executive: Dr. Samson Viulu, Permanent Secretary of Agriculture and Livestock
- Website: https://solomons.gov.sb/ministry-of-agriculture-and-livestock/

The Ministry of Agriculture and Livestock (MAL) is one of the ministries in the Solomon Islands Government.

The ministry delivers government services for creating, implementing and coordinating regulatory agricultural services. MAL also works to improve the delivery and development of commercial agriculture and livestock policy in Solomon Islands.

== Organisation ==
MAL consists of the following departments and units:

- Agriculture Planning and Land Use Department
- Agriculture Extension and Training Department
- Agriculture Research and Development Department
- Livestock Production and Veterinary Services Department
- Biosecurity Solomon Islands Department
- Corporate Services Department
- MAL information Unit
