= RVS Tukoro =

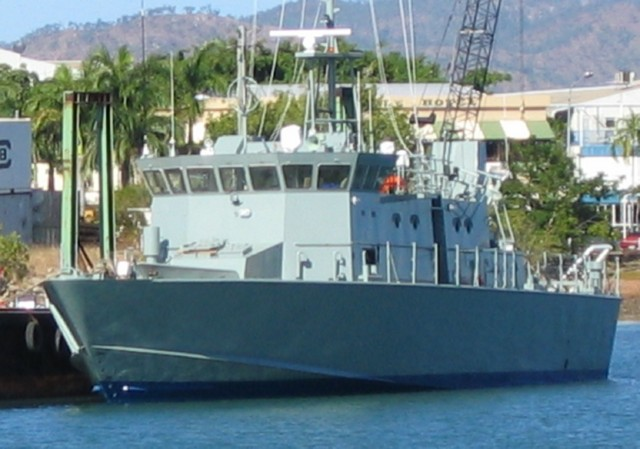
- Tukoro moored in Townsville in 2004.

History

Vanuatu
- Name: Tukoro
- Status: Ship in active service

General characteristics
- Class & type: Pacific Forum-class patrol boat
- Displacement: 162 tons
- Length: 103 ft (31 m)

RVS Tukoro is a Pacific Forum patrol boat that performs fishery protection, search and rescue and sovereignty patrols for Vanuatu. Tukoro is one of twenty-two small patrol vessels Australia designed and built for smaller fellow members of the Pacific Forum, after the United Nations Convention on the Law of the Sea established that all maritime nations were entitled to exercise control over a 200-kilometre (120 mi) exclusive economic zone.

== Design ==
Tukoro, like her sister ships, displaces approximately 160 tonnes, and can accommodate a crew of eighteen for missions lasting ten days or less. The vessel's maximum speed is 24 knots (44 km/h; 28 mph). Australia chose commercial off the shelf equipment, instead of cutting edge military-grade equipment, to ease the maintenance burden for small nations' maintenance facilities.

== Operational history ==
Tukoro was severely damaged on March 14, 2015 by Cyclone Pam. Hurricane Pam was extremely severe, with winds up to 320 kilometres per hour (200 mph). Tukoro was washed ashore on Moso Island. Australia offered to repair the vessel, and provide further training to Vanuatu personnel. The repairs took approximately sixteen months, and the vessel returned to service on August 23, 2016.

In February and March 2017 Tukoro engaged in a joint fishery protection operation with her sister ship from the Solomon Islands, RSIPV Lata. In September 2017 Tukoro helped provide disaster relief to evacuees after the Ambae volcano eruption.

Australia is scheduled to replace Tukoro was a larger and more capable Guardian-class patrol boat in 2021.
