= Ministry of Mines, Energy and Rural Electrification =

Ministry of the Solomon Islands Government

Agency overview
- Jurisdiction: Government of Solomon Islands
- Headquarters: Honiara, Solomon Islands
- Minister responsible: Derick Rawcliff Manu'ari, Minister of Mines, Energy and Rural Electrification
- Agency executive: Chris Vehe, Permanent Secretary for the Ministry of Mines, Energy and Rural Electrification
- Website: https://www.mmere.gov.sb/

The Ministry of Mines, Energy and Rural Electrification (MMERE) is one of the ministries of the Solomon Islands Government.

The ministry delivers government services for geological sciences and is responsible for regulatory and legal development of energy, water, petroleum and mineral resource policy. MMERE also is responsible for mitigation of greenhouse gases and hydrological hazards.

== Organisation ==
MMERE consists of the following divisions:

Technical Divisions:

- Mines
- Geological Survey
- Petroleum
- Energy
- Water Resources Management

Administrative Divisions:

- Executive
- Corporate Services
