= Ministry of Forestry and Research (Solomon Islands) =

Agency overview
- Jurisdiction: Government of Solomon Islands
- Headquarters: Honiara, Solomon Islands
- Minister responsible: Makario Tagini, Minister of Forestry and Research
- Agency executive: Richardson Raomae, Permanent Secretary of Forestry and Research
- Website: https://solomons.gov.sb/ministry-of-forestry-research/

The Ministry of Forestry and Research (MFR) is one of the government ministries in the Solomon Islands Government. The ministry has primary responsibility for delivering government services promoting sustainable forest management.

MFR is also responsible for monitoring logging operations, conducting environmental research and implementing conservation programs in the Solomon Islands.

== Organisation ==
MFR consists of the following six divisions:

- Corporate Services
- Forest Development and Reforestation
- Forest Resource Management and Technical Service
- Forest Industries
- National Herbarium and Botanical Garden
- Timber Utilization Division
