= Correctional Services of Solomon Islands =

Government agency of the Solomon Islands

Correctional Services of Solomon Islands (CSSI) is the correctional agency of the government of the Solomon Islands. It was previously known as the Solomon Islands Prison Service (SIPS). The CSSI is part of the Solomon Islands Ministry of Police, National Security and Correctional Services (MPNSCS).

== Facilities ==
The CSSI operates six Correctional Centres within the country in Rove, Tetere, Kirakira, Auki, Lata and Gizo.

Construction on the Gizo Correctional Centre in Gizo, Western Province began in December 2010.

The service also operates the Auki Correctional Centre in Auki, Malaita Province. The prison, newly constructed as of 2009, can house up to 60 prisoners. It has dedicated space for women and juvenile prisoners.
