= RSIPV Lata =

Australian patrol boat given to Solomon Islands

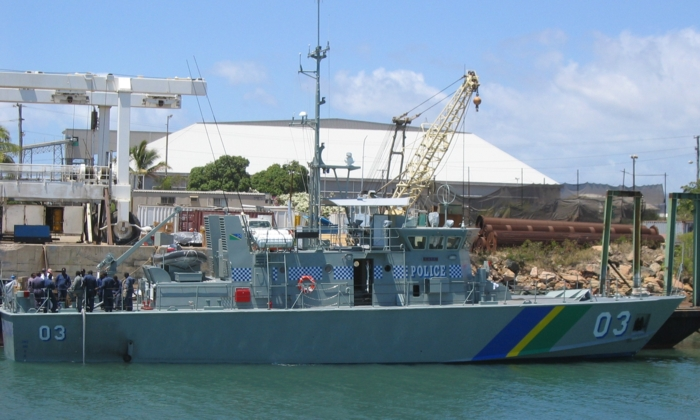
- Lata at Townsville Harbour for maintenance

History

Solomon Islands
- Name: Lata
- Operator: Royal Solomon Islands Police Force
- Launched: 1988
- Decommissioned: September 11, 2019
- Identification: MMSI number: 557000100; Callsign: H4TY
- Status: decommissioned

General characteristics
- Class & type: Pacific Forum-class patrol boat
- Displacement: 162 tons
- Length: 103 ft (31 m)

RSIPV Lata is one of the Pacific Forum patrol boats Australia gave to the Royal Solomon Islands Police Force.

== Background ==
Following the United Nations Convention on the Law of the Sea extending maritime nations' exclusive economic zones to 200 kilometres (110 nmi), Australia agreed to design, build, and donate patrol vessels to twelve of its fellow members of the Pacific Forum so they could police and extend sovereignty to their exclusive economic zones using their own resources. Australia also helped build bases for the vessels, provide training, and help with maintenance.

== Design ==
Australia designed the vessels using commercial off-the-shelf equipment instead of cutting-edge, high-performance, military grade equipment, to ease the maintenance burden for their smaller neighbours.

== Operational history ==
According to the Nautilus Institute, Malaitan militias commandeered Lata in June 2000, and used it to attack Guadalcanal villages and bombard Honiara, capital of the Solomon Islands.

Australian Foreign Minister Bob Carr inspected Lata, and her sister ship Auki, on a visit to Honiara in August 2012.

In February and March 2017 Lata engaged in a joint fishery protection operation with her sister ship from Vanuatu, RVS Tukoro.

In April 2018 Marise Payne, Australian Minister of Defence, inspected Lata, during a visit to Honiara.

== Replacement ==
Australia replaced Lata with the RSIPV Gizo a larger and more capable Guardian-class patrol boat, on November 8, 2019. Her sister ship, Auki is scheduled to be replaced in 2022 or 2023.

Lata was officially decommissioned at Aola Base, Point Cruz in Honiara, on September 11, 2019. She then proceeded to Australia for recycling.
