= Ministry of Traditional Governance, Peace and Ecclesiastical Affairs (Solomon Islands) =

Agency overview
- Jurisdiction: Government of Solomon Islands
- Minister responsible: George Temahua, Minister of Traditional Governance, Peace and Ecclesiastical Affairs
- Agency executive: Lottie Vaisekave, Permanent Secretary of Traditional Governance, Peace and Ecclesiastical Affairs
- Website: https://solomons.gov.sb/ministry-of-traditional-governance-peace-and-ecclesiastical-affairs/

The Ministry of Traditional Governance, Peace and Ecclesiastical Affairs (MTGPEA) is one of the ministries of the Solomon Islands Government.

The ministry delivers government services to mediate conflicts, facilitate peace building training and facilitate the creation of traditional governance structures and systems. It is also responsible for coordinating with stakeholders on peace building initiatives and developing a national peace policy in Solomon Islands.

MTGPEA was previously named the Ministry of National Unity, Reconciliation and Peace.

== Organisation ==
MTGPEA consists of the following divisions:

- Corporate Services
- Traditional Governance
- Peace and Ecclesiastical Affairs
- Policy, Planning, Programme Development
