= Ministry of Home Affairs (Solomon Islands) =

Government ministry in Solomon Islands

Agency overview
- Jurisdiction: Government of Solomon Islands
- Minister responsible: Mannaseh Maelanga, Minister of Home Affairs
- Agency executive: Jeffery Sade Deve, Permanent Secretary of the Ministry of Home Affairs
- Website: https://solomons.gov.sb/ministry-of-home-affairs/

The Ministry of Home Affairs (MHA) is one of the government ministries in the Solomon Islands government. It has primary responsibility for electoral reform, legislative reviews and managing civil affairs.

MHA also plays a central role in strengthening relationships with the Honiara City Council and delivering community services such as sports grants.

== Organisation ==
MHA consists of the following six divisions:

- Corporate Services
- Civil Registration
- Civil Affairs
- Sports
- Solomon Islands Electoral Commission
- Honiara City Council
