= Ministry of Fisheries and Marine Resources (Solomon Islands) =

Government agency

Agency overview
- Jurisdiction: Government of Solomon Islands
- Headquarters: Honiara, Solomon Islands
- Minister responsible: Polycarp Paea, Minister of Fisheries and Marine Resources
- Agency executive: Dr. Christain Ramofafia, Permanent Secretary of Ministry of Fisheries and Marine Resources
- Website: https://solomons.gov.sb/ministry-of-fisheries-and-marine-resources/

The Ministry of Fisheries and Marine Resources (MFMR) is one of the government ministries in the Solomon Islands government. It has primary responsibility for coordinating fisheries activities within the exclusive economic zone of the Solomon Islands.

MFMR also plays a central role in delivering services in relation to national policies on the use and management of fisheries, improving aquaculture and marine resources and ensuring that harvesting practices are done in a coordinated and responsible manner.

== Organsiation ==
MFMR consists of the following seven divisions:

- Corporate Services
- Policy and Planning
- Provincial Fisheries
- Project Management
- Inshore
- Offshore
- Aquaculture
