= Ministry of Culture and Tourism (Solomon Islands) =

Government Ministry of the Solomon Islands

Agency overview
- Jurisdiction: Government of Solomon Islands
- Headquarters: Honiara, Solomon Islands
- Minister responsible: James Bonunga, Minister of Culture and Tourism
- Agency executive: Bunyan Sivoro, Permanent Secretary of the Ministry of Culture and Tourism
- Website: solomons.gov.sb/ministry-of-culture-and-tourism/

The Ministry of Culture and Tourism (MCT) is one of the ministries of the Solomon Islands Government.

The ministry delivers government services for culture and tourism. The ministry's primary responsibility is to manage growth and economic development opportunities across the tourism, cultural, arts and heritage industries. The ministry achieves this by partnering with industry stakeholders, Government and development partners.

== Organisation ==
MCT consists of the following divisions:

- Corporate Services Division
- Culture Division
- Tourism Division
- Solomon Islands National Museum (SINM)
- National Archives of Solomon Islands (NASI)
- National Art Gallery
