= Ian Vaevaso =

Solomon Islands police officer

Commissioner of the Royal Solomon Islands Police Force
- Incumbent
- Assumed office April 2026

Ian Vaevaso is the current Commissioner of the Royal Solomon Islands Police Force (RSIPF). He was previously the Deputy Commissioner of National Security and Operation Support (NSOS).

Vaevaso is currently suspended from his role as Commissioner of the RSIPF, due to a government investigation.

== Early life and education ==
Vaevaso attended The University of the South Pacific and holds a degree in policing.

== Career ==
Vaevaso previously served as Chief Superintendent in the RSIPF. In July 2017, Vaevaso was appointed Assistant Commissioner Crime and Intelligence.

In December 2020, Vaevaso was appointed Deputy Commissioner of NSOS.

In June 2025, Vaevaso was awarded the Member of the Order of the British Empire (OBE) in recognition of his leadership and contributions to the RSIPF.

In April 2026, Vaevaso was appointed Commissioner of the RSIPF.

In June 2026, Vaevaso was suspended as Commissioner of the RSIPF due to allegations of improper management of methamphetamine narcotics in 2024 and concerns regarding his selection for the role of police commissioner.

== Controversies ==
In 2024, Vaevaso allegedly broke police protocol by ordering officers to give him confiscated methamphetamine which he then dumped into the sea. Government documents from the office of the Director of Public Prosecutions alleged that Vaevaso had lied to investigators and intimidated other officers during an internal police investigation into the wrongdoing.

Prior to his appointment as Commissioner in April 2026, opposition leader Matthew Wale released a statement that his appointment was a "threat to accountability and public trust".
