= Sport in the Solomon Islands =

Sport is an important part of Solomon Islands culture dating back to the early colonial period. Cricket, Australian rules football, rugby union and horse racing are among the earliest organised sports in Solomon Islands. Sport has shaped the Solomon Islands national identity through events. Solomon Islands hosted the 2023 Pacific Games in Honiara.

== History ==
The Solomon Islands national rugby union team has been playing internationals since 1969. It took part in the Oceania qualifying tournament for the 2003 and 2007 Rugby World Cups, but failed to qualify on each occasion.

On 14 June 2008, the Solomon Islands national futsal team, the Kurukuru, won the Oceania Futsal Championship in Fiji to qualify them for the 2008 FIFA Futsal World Cup, which was held in Brazil from 30 September to 19 October 2008. Solomon Islands is the futsal defending champions in the Oceania region.

In 2008 and 2009 the Kurukuru won the Oceania Futsal Championship in Fiji. In 2009 they defeated the host nation Fiji, 8–0, to claim the title.

== Background ==
Rugby Union is played in Solomon Islands. National teams in association football and the related futsal and beach soccer have proved among the most successful in Oceania. The Solomon Islands national football team is part of the OFC confederation in FIFA.

== Ranking ==
They are currently ranked 184th out of 209 teams in the FIFA World Rankings. The team became the first team to beat New Zealand in qualifying for a play-off spot against Australia for qualification to the World Cup 2006. They were defeated 7–0 in Australia and 2–1 at home.

The Kurukuru currently hold the world record for the fastest ever goal scored in an official futsal match. It was set by Kurukuru captain Elliot Ragomo, who scored against New Caledonia three seconds into the game in July 2009. They also, however, hold the less enviable record for the worst defeat in the history of the FIFA Futsal World Cup, when in 2008 they were beaten by Russia with two goals to thirty-one.

The Solomon Islands national beach soccer team, the Bilikiki Boys, are statistically the most successful team in Oceania. They have won all three regional championships to date, thereby qualifying on each occasion for the FIFA Beach Soccer World Cup. The Bilikiki Boys are ranked fourteenth in the world as of 2010, higher than any other team from Oceania.

== See also ==
- Rugby league in Solomon Islands
- Rugby union in Solomon Islands
