= Ministry of Rural Development (Solomon Islands) =

Agency overview
- Jurisdiction: Government of Solomon Islands
- Minister responsible: Daniel Waneoroa, Minister of Rural Development
- Agency executive: John Noroa Misiteé, Permanent Secretary of Rural Development
- Website: https://solomons.gov.sb/ministry-of-rural-development/

The Ministry of Rural Development (MRD) is one of the ministries of the Solomon Islands Government.

The ministry delivers government services for the planning and implementation of the Rural Development Policy. MRD also works to improve the economic and social livelihood of rural Solomon Islanders.

== Organisation ==
MRD consists of the following divisions and units:

- Corporate Support Services Division
- Rural Development Division
- Finance & Accounts Unit
- Communication and Public Relations Unit
