= Cheka (surname) =

Cheka is the surname of the following notable people:

- Francis Cheka (born 1982), Tanzanian boxer
- Kate Cheka (born 1989), English comedian
- Luke Sisi Cheka, Solomon Islands government official
