= Ministry of Lands, Housing, and Survey (Solomon Islands) =

Agency overview
- Jurisdiction: Government of Solomon Islands
- Headquarters: Honiara, Solomon Islands
- Minister responsible: Oliver Salopuka, Minister of Lands, Housing, and Survey
- Agency executive: Stanley Waleanisia, Permanent Secretary of Ministry of Lands, Housing, and Survey
- Website: https://www.lands.gov.sb/

The Ministry of Lands, Housing, and Survey (MLHS) is one of the ministries of the Solomon Islands Government.

The ministry delivers government services for land administration including recording land transactions and ensuring land rents are based on fair and transparent principles. The ministry is also responsible for providing surveying and valuation services.

== Organisation ==
MLHS consists of the following divisions:

- Corporate Services & Finance Division
- Geographic Operations, Survey and Cadastral Information Division
- Government Housing Division
- Land Administration & Management Group (LAOG) Division
- Land Reform
- Mapping Section (NGIC)
- Physical Planning Division
- Valuation Division
