= Ministry of Police, National Security and Correctional Services =

Agency overview
- Jurisdiction: Government of Solomon Islands
- Headquarters: Honiara, Solomon Islands
- Minister responsible: John Tuhaika Junior, Minister of Police, National Security and Correctional Services
- Agency executive: Karen Barimata Galokale, Permanent Secretary of Ministry of Police, National Security and Correctional Services
- Website: https://solomons.gov.sb/ministry-of-police-national-security-and-correctional-services/

The Ministry of Police, National Security and Correctional Services is one of the government ministries in the Solomon Islands government.

MPNSCS's role is to coordinate and support the Royal Solomon Islands Police Force and the Correctional Services of Solomon Islands.

== Organisation ==
The Ministry of Police, National Security and Correctional Services has the following Divisions:

- Planning and Policy
- National Security
- Border Security
- Administration
- Infrastructure
- Accounts
- Executive
