= Ministry of National Planning and Development Coordination (Solomon Islands) =

Agency overview
- Jurisdiction: Government of Solomon Islands
- Headquarters: Honiara, Solomon Islands
- Minister responsible: Peter Kenilorea Jr., Minister of National Planning and Development Coordination
- Agency executive: Susan Sulu, Permanent Secretary of Ministry of National Planning and Development Coordination
- Website: https://solomons.gov.sb/ministry-of-national-planning-and-development-coordination

The Ministry of National Planning and Development Coordination (MNPDC) is one of the government ministries in the Solomon Islands government. It has primary responsibility in enabling the government to develop and implement development strategies on a national level.

MNPDC is also responsible for implementing the National Development Strategy 2016-2035, and coordinates disaster recovery efforts when needed.

== Organisation ==
MNPDC consists of the following seven Divisions:

- The Executive Management
- Corporate Services
- Development Cooperation
- Strategic Planning and Budget Allocation
- Programme Quality
- Social Development and Governance Sector
- Economic and Productive Sector

MNPDC also has Units, which work in conjunction with the ministry. One example is the Resource Mobilisation Unit (RMU), whose creation was announced on August 25, 2026.
