= Ricky Fuo'o =

Solomon Islands politician

Minister of Infrastructure and Development
- Incumbent
- Assumed office May 2025

Ricky Fuo'o is the current Minister for Infrastructure Development (MID) in Solomon Islands. He has held several senior positions within Solomon Islands Government and is a current Member of Parliament for Central Kwara'ae Constituency.

== Early life and education ==
In 2015, Fuo'o and his father Justin Fuo'o created Tropic Group Builders, a construction company that operates in Solomon Islands.

In March 2021, Fuo'o was elected Chairman of Solomon Islands Chamber of Commerce and Industry (SICCI). A position he held until March 2024.

== Political career ==
In the April 2024 national election, Fuo'o was elected MP for Central Kwara'ae Constituency. In May 2024, Fuo'o was sworn in as Minister for Infrastructure Development.

Following the 2024 election, Jackson Fiulaua (former MP for Central Kwara'ae) lodged a petition to the high court that alleged corrupt, illegal and fraudulent voting had occurred. In January 2025, the high court dismissed the case and stated it lacked substantial evidence and was improperly served.
