= Luke Sisi Cheka =

Permanent Secretary of Ministry of Public Service
- Incumbent
- Assumed office April 2024

Luke Sisi Cheka is the current permanent secretary of the Ministry of Public Service (MPS) in Solomon Islands. He has held a variety of senior positions within Solomon Islands government in both the Office of the Prime Minister and Cabinet and the Ministry of Public Service.

== Early life and education ==
Cheka holds degrees from both the University of Papua New Guinea and University of South Pacific.

== Career ==
Cheka commenced his career in the public service in 2005. He held various senior roles including Human Resource Manager in the Office of the Prime Minister and Cabinet

In January 2023, he was appointed Deputy Secretary at the Ministry of Public Service. He was later appointed Acting Permanent Secretary for the Ministry of Public Service.

In April 2024, he was sworn in as the Permanent Secretary for the Ministry of Public Service. During his time in this position Cheka has represented the Solomons in international forums such as the United Nations where he worked to combat corruption and promote integrity in Solomon Islands public service.
