= Ministry of Environment, Climate Change, Disaster Management and Meteorology =

Agency overview
- Jurisdiction: Government of Solomon Islands
- Headquarters: Honiara, Solomon Islands
- Minister responsible: Wayne Ghemu, Minister of Environment, Climate Change, Disaster Management and Meteorology
- Agency executive: Susuan Sulu, Permanent Secretary of Environment, Climate Change, Disaster Management and Meteorology
- Website: http://www.mecdm.gov.sb/about-us.html

The Ministry of Environment, Climate Change, Disaster Management and Meteorology (MECDM) is one of the government ministries in the Solomon Islands Government. It has primary responsibility for ensuring sustainable environmental management in the Solomons and works to ensure climate change adaptation and mitigation.

It also plays a role in disaster risk management and meteorological services in the Solomon Islands.

== Organisation ==
MECDM consists of the following four divisions:

- Climate Change
- Corporate Services
- Environment & Conservation
- Meteorological Services
