= Ministry of Public Service (Solomon Islands) =

Agency overview
- Jurisdiction: Government of Solomon Islands
- Headquarters: Honiara, Solomon Islands
- Minister responsible: Francis Motcho Belande Sade, Minister of Public Service
- Agency executive: Luke Sisi Cheka, Permanent Secretary of Public Service
- Website: https://solomons.gov.sb/ministry-of-public-service

The Ministry of Public Service (MPS) is one of the ministries in the Solomon Islands government. MPS is responsible for human resource governance within the Solomon Islands Public Service.

MPS works to improve ethics and integrity within the government and also ensures recruitment, retention and separation is done in an impartial and merit based manner.

== Organisation ==
MPS is made up of the following five divisions:

- Executive
- Public Service Commission
- Corporate Services
- Governance Performance Management
- Workforce Management
