= RSIPV Auki =

Patrol boat of the Solomon Islands police

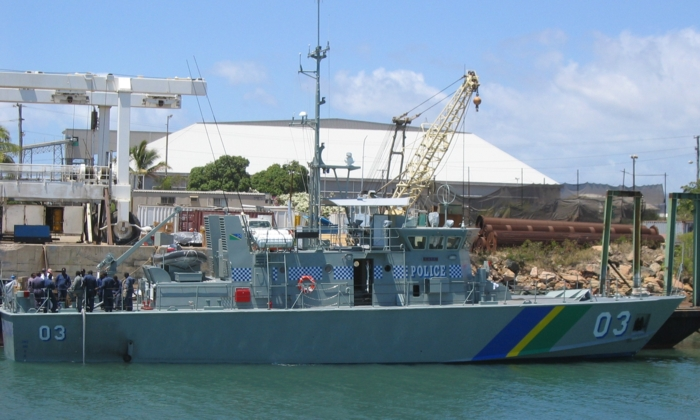
- Lata, sister ship to Auki

History

Solomon Islands
- Name: Auki
- Operator: Solomon Islands
- Launched: 1991
- Decommissioned: March 4, 2021
- Status: decommissioned

General characteristics
- Class & type: Pacific Forum-class patrol boat
- Displacement: 162 tons
- Length: 103 ft (31 m)

RSIPV Auki is one of the Pacific Forum patrol boats Australia gave to the Royal Solomon Islands Police Force.

== Background ==
Following the United Nations Convention on the Law of the Sea extending maritime nations' exclusive economic zones to 200 kilometres (110 nmi), Australia agreed to design, build, and give twelve of its fellow members of the Pacific Forum patrol vessels, so they could police and extend sovereignty to their exclusive economic zones using their own resources. Australia also helped build bases for the vessels, provide training, and help with maintenance.

== Design ==
Australia designed the vessels to use commercial off-the-shelf equipment instead of cutting-edge, high-performance, military grade equipment, to ease the maintenance burden for their smaller neighbours.

== Operational history ==
Auki helped provide aid to Vanuatu in 2015, after it was struck by the tropical Cyclone Pam in March that year.

Auki remained in service after her sister ship Lata was decommissioned on September 11, 2019.

Auki helped distribute ballot boxes in Vanuatu, in preparation for a general election, in March 2020. Following detection of a tourist infected with the COVID-19 virus, in Vanuatu, Auki moored offshore of their opposite number's base, and prepared to begin a 14-day quarantine period, prior to returning to the Solomon Islands.

== Replacement ==
RSIPV Auki was official decommissioned on March 4, 2021.

Australia is scheduled to replace Auki with the RSIPV Taro, a new, larger and more capable Guardian-class patrol boat in May 2021.
