= Rugby union in Solomon Islands =

- Country: Solomon Islands
- Governing body: Solomon Islands Rugby Union
- National team: Solomon Islands
- Registered players: 3,068
- Clubs: 24

National competitions
- Rugby World Cup; Rugby World Cup Sevens; IRB Sevens World Series

Rugby union is a popular sport in Solomon Islands. The national team have competed in various international competitions. They are currently ranked 69th by the IRB, with 3068 registered players and 24 clubs.

== Governing body ==
The governing body is the Solomon Islands Rugby Union.

== History ==
Rugby union continues to be a popular sport in Solomon Islands despite aggressive occasional overtures from rugby league. Despite large amounts of money and advertising, Solomon Islanders remained loyal to rugby union, and rugby league in the islands underwent a ten-year hibernation. These efforts have now been compounded by Rupert Murdoch backed television, but still without little return from the vast amounts of money spent.

Delegates from Solomon Islands were amongst those who went to the centenary congress of the International Rugby Football Board in 1986.

Like many Pacific archipelagos, rugby sevens is the preferred code, and there are regular competitions.

There is also a successful schools competition.

== National team ==
The Solomon Islands national rugby union team played their first international at 18 August 1969, losing to Papua New Guinea by 23-5. Their next game, three days later, with Fiji show their record loss of 113-13. Both games were part of the 3rd South Pacific Games. Since then they have played in only a small number of internationals. Their first win came in 1983, in a 19-12 win over Niue, for the 7th South Pacific Games.
