= List of World Heritage Sites in Solomon Islands =

Location of World Heritage Sites in Solomon Islands

The United Nations Educational, Scientific and Cultural Organization (UNESCO) designates World Heritage Sites of outstanding universal value to cultural or natural heritage which have been nominated by countries which are signatories to the UNESCO World Heritage Convention, established in 1972. Cultural heritage consists of monuments (such as architectural works, monumental sculptures, or inscriptions), groups of buildings, and sites (including archaeological sites). Natural features (consisting of physical and biological formations), geological and physiographical formations (including habitats of threatened species of animals and plants), and natural sites which are important from the point of view of science, conservation or natural beauty, are defined as natural heritage. Solomon Islands accepted the convention on June 20, 1992, making their historical sites eligible for inclusion on the list. As of 2023, Solomon Islands has only one World Heritage Site.

== World Heritage Sites ==
UNESCO lists sites under ten criteria; each entry must meet at least one of the criteria. Criteria i through vi are cultural, and vii through x are natural.

† In danger

World Heritage Sites
Site	Image	Location (province)	Year listed	UNESCO data	Description
East Rennell	A dugout canoe in the Rennell Island lagoon	Rennell and Bellona	1998	854; ix (natural)	East Rennell makes up the southern third of Rennell Island, the southernmost island in the Solomon Island group in the western Pacific. Rennell, 86 km long x 15 km wide, is the largest raised coral atoll in the world. The site includes approximately 37,000 ha and a marine area extending 3 nautical miles to sea. A major feature of the island is Lake Tegano, which was the former lagoon on the atoll. The lake, the largest in the insular Pacific (15,500 ha), is brackish and contains many rugged limestone islands and endemic species. Rennell is mostly covered with dense forest, with a canopy averaging 20 m in height. Combined with the strong climatic effects of frequent cyclones, the site is a true natural laboratory for scientific study. The site is under customary land ownership and management.

== Tentative list ==
In addition to sites inscribed on the World Heritage List, member states can maintain a list of tentative sites that they may consider for nomination. Nominations for the World Heritage List are only accepted if the site was previously listed on the tentative list. As of 2023, the Solomon Islands have listed two properties on their tentative list.

Tentative sites
Site	Image	Location (province)	Year listed	UNESCO criteria	Description
Marovo - Tetepare Complex	A picture of the beach of Marovo Lagoon	Western Province	2008	iii, v, vi, vii, viii, ix, x (mixed)	
Tropical Rainforest Heritage of Solomon Islands	An image of the Sunlight Channel with Mbanika on the left, Pavuvu on the right, and Tillotson Cove on the top left.	Choiseul Province, Guadalcanal Province, Makira-Ulawa Province, Western Province	2008	vii, ix, x (natural)	
