= Ministry of Justice and Legal Affairs (Solomon Islands) =

The Ministry of Justice and Legal Affairs of Solomon Islands is a department of the government of the Solomon Islands.

== List of ministers (1980-present) ==
=== Minister of Law and Information ===
- Colin Gauwane (1979-1980)

=== Minister of Police and Justice ===
- P. Keyaumi (1981-1983)
- Allan Qurusu (1984)
- Swanson C. Konofilia (1985-1988)
- Allan Kemakeza (1989-1990)
- Albert Laore (1991-1993)

=== Minister of Justice ===
- Jackson Piasi (1993-1994)
- Oliver Zapo (1994-1996)
- Edmond Andresen Karaer (1998-2000)

=== Minister of Police, Justice & Legal Affairs ===
- William Haomae (2000-2001)
- Benjamin Una (2002)
- Augustine Taneko (2002-2004)
- Michael Maina (2004-2008)

=== Minister of Justice and Legal Affairs ===
- Toswel Kaua (2008-2009)
- Laurie Chan (2009-2010)
- Commins Mewa (2010-2014)
- Ismael Avui (2015)
- William Marau (2015-2017)
- Derrick Manuari (2017–present)

== See also ==
- Justice ministry
- Politics of the Solomon Islands
