= Mostyn Mangau =

Senior Police Officer in the Solomon Islands

Mostyn Mangau OBE BEM
- Born: Solomon Islands
- Occupation: Police officer
- Known for: appointed to the Royal Solomon Islands Police Force Executive

Mostyn Mangau is a senior police officer in the Solomon Islands.

== Honors ==
In 2014, Mangau was honored with a British Empire Medal. Four other officers received similar honors.

In June 2025, Commissioner Mangau was awarded the Officer of the Order of the British Empire (OBE) for his distinguished leadership, dedication, and long-standing service to policing and public safety in the Solomon Islands.

== Career ==
In February 2018, Mangau announced an initiative to destroy rogue crocodiles observed near Bonegi, Guadalcanal, and assured the public that managing the crocodile population was a priority for the police.

He was promoted to Deputy Commissioner of Police from Assistant Commissioner of Police, on October 24, 2019. He was also appointed to the Royal Solomon Islands Police Force Executive. His responsibilities include National Security.

Mangau attended the commissioning of the RSIPV Gizo in his capacity of acting police commissioner. He called the Gizo the "pride of the fleet".

In September 2024, Mostyn Mangau was sworn in as the Commissioner of the RSIPF for the next 12 months. This occurred after the Solomon Islands Government cabinet approved his re-appointment as the Commissioner of RSIPF.
