= Protected areas of Solomon Islands =

Protected areas in Solomon Islands

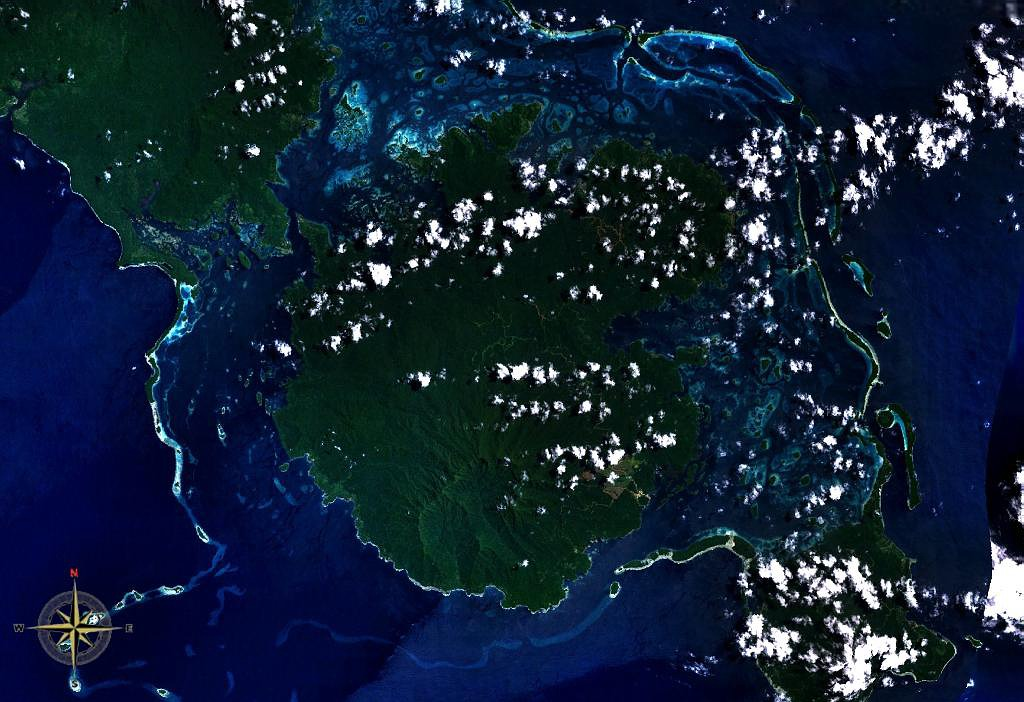
Vangunu island as seen from space; Marovo Lagoon can be seen north of the island.

Protected areas of Solomon Islands include marine protected areas that encompass coral reefs, lagoons, and seagrass meadows. East Rennell, which includes Lake Tegano (Te Nggano), is the only area in the Solomon Islands (the Solomons) listed by UNESCO as a World Heritage Site. As of April 2024, the Solomons have not nominated any wetlands under the Convention on Wetlands of International Importance (known as the Ramsar Convention).

The exclusive economic zone of the Solomons spans 1,589,477 km^{2} (613,701 sq mi) of the Pacific Ocean. The Solomons are part of the Coral Triangle, the region of the western Pacific with the world's greatest diversity of corals and coral reef species. The recognizable reef systems in the Solomons include fringing reef, patch reef, barrier reef, atoll reef, and lagoon environment. The Coral reefs of the Solomons total 6,750 km^{2} (2,610 sq mi). As of 2020, there are 113 locally managed marine areas (LMMA) containing an estimated 155 no-take zones in the Solomons. The largest LMMA, with a contiguous 13 km (10 mi) no-take zone, is on Tetepare Island.

== Queen Elizabeth II National Park ==
The Queen Elizabeth II National Park was established in 1953 as a 15,000-acre (61 km^{2}) park near the capital Honiara on Guadalcanal. It is the only national park in the Solomons. Guadalcanal people disputed the government's right to use the land that became the park; people occupied parts of the park and cleared and farmed the land. In 1973 the park was reduced to 2,000 acres (8.1 km^{2}) as it was recognised that much of it had been degraded by illegal logging and the effects of the settlements.

== Marine protected areas and conservation areas ==
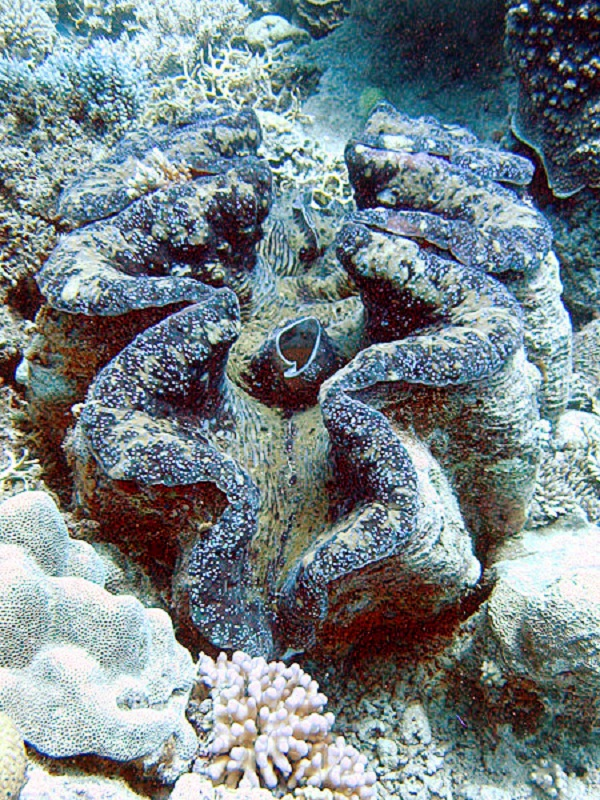
Tridacna gigas, with the mantle showing

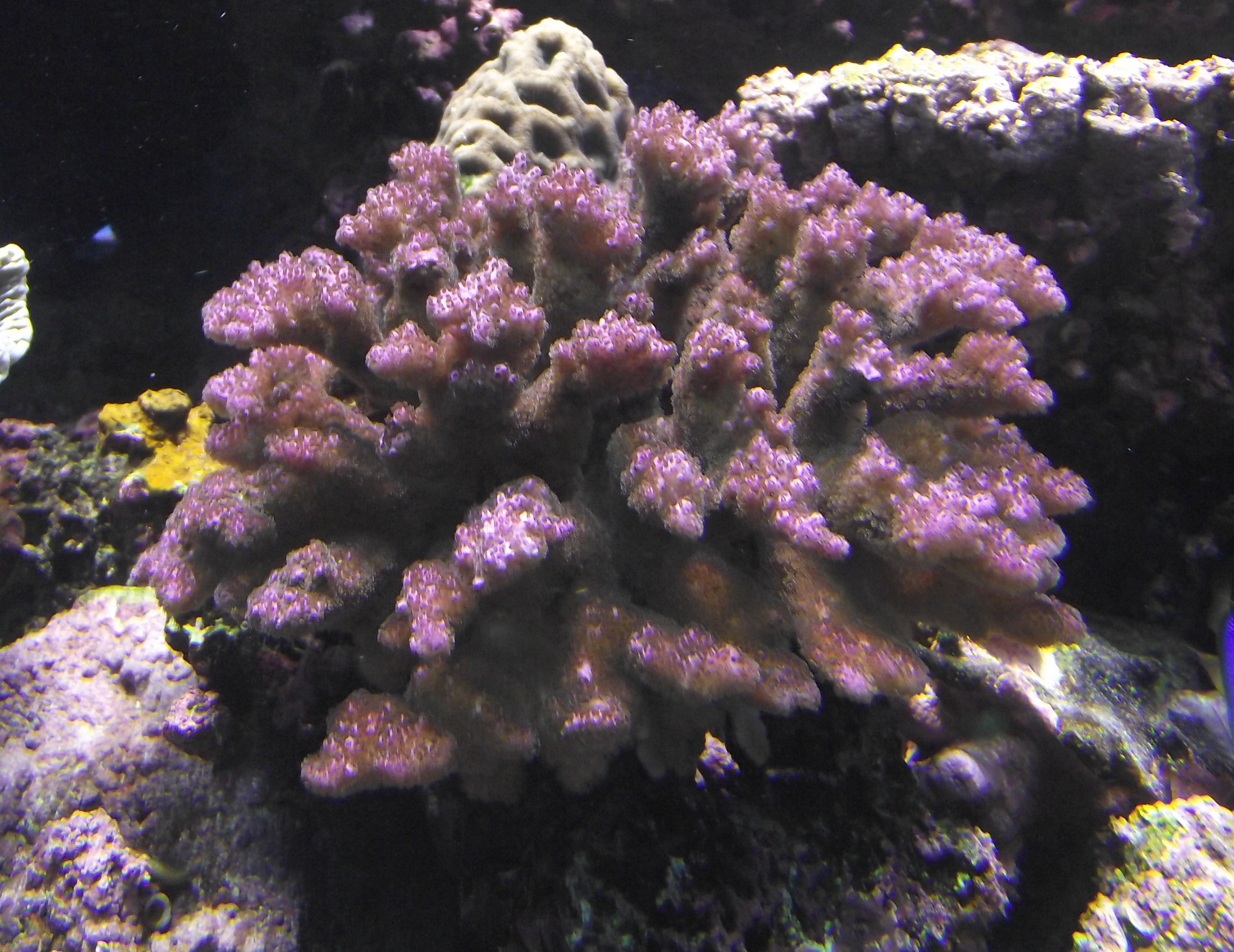
Pocillopora verrucosa

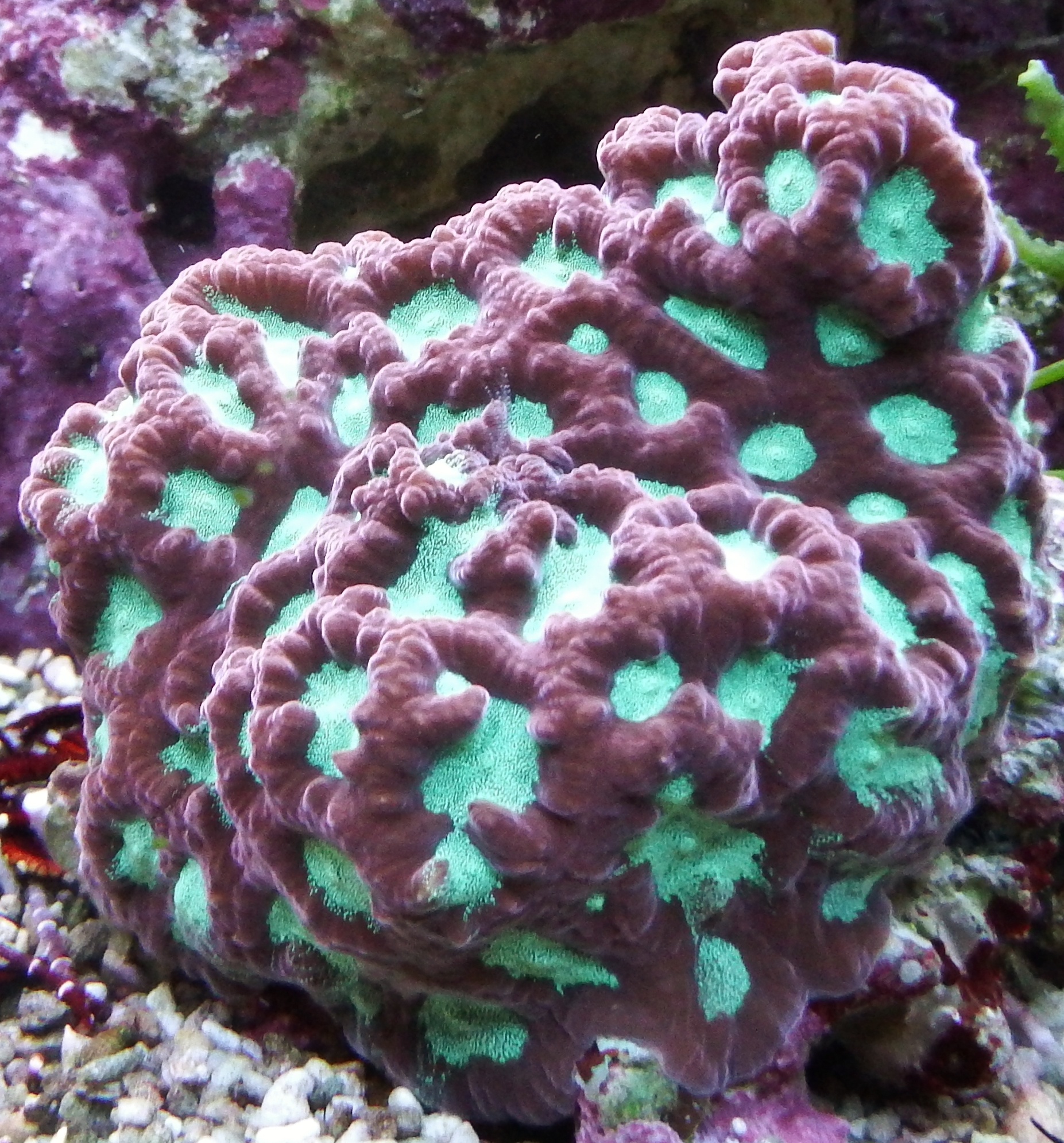
Favites pentagona

As of April 2024, there are 38 marine protected areas, marine conservation areas and community conservation areas in the Solomons, which are managed by local communities, as well as two forest reserves. The World Database on Protected Areas (WDPA) includes the following protected areas in the Solomons:

- Arnavon Community Marine Conservation Area, 169.09 km^{2} (65.29 sq mi), in Isabel Province, was created in 1995 and includes reef sites and lagoons.
- Komarindi Conservation Area, 193 km^{2} (75 sq mi) was created in 1994 on Guadalcanal. The Komarindi Catchment Conservation Area Project (KCCAP) is a community-based project for the sustainable management of the Komarindi Conservation Area and its resources.
- Kolombangara Forest Reserve is a controlled forest on Kolombangara (a dormant volcano) in the New Georgia Islands. The conservation area is the upland forest above 400 metres (1,300 ft), including Mt. Rano 1,698 metres (5,571 ft), Mt. Tepalamenggatu 1,708 metres (5,604 ft) and Mt. Veve 1,779 metres (5,837 ft). It covers 28% of Kolombangara and is the largest conservation area in the Solomons.
- Naro (controlled forest), 5.79 km^{2} (2.24 sq mi), is a Terrestrial and Inland Waters Protected Area created in 1900 on Guadalcanal.
- Padezaka Tribal Forest Conservation Area, 48.23 km^{2} (18.62 sq mi), is a Terrestrial and Inland Waters Protected Area on Isabel that was created in 2021 and is managed by the Padezaka Protected Area Management Committee.
- Tetepare, 120 km^{2} (46 sq mi), is a marine protected area and community conserved area, encompassing Tetepare Island. The Tetepare Descendants' Association (TDA) established a 13-kilometre-long (8-mile) marine protected area on Tetepare, which is a no-take zone. TDA rangers, marine monitors, seagrass monitors and turtle monitors work on the island to patrol and protect the MPA and the forest, to monitor the health of the island's reefs, seagrass meadows and forests, and to tag turtles and protect and relocate turtle nests during the nesting season from September to April.
- Zaira Resource Management Area, on the western coast of Vangunu Island and New Georgia Island in Western Province, covers 450 km^{2} (170 sq mi).
- Zinoa Marine Conservation Area, adjacent to Zinoa Island on the south-west side of Choiseul Island, covers 150 ha or 1.5 km^{2} (0.58 sq mi) and consists of two small islands and associated reefs; Rabakel is a marine protected area (MPA), measuring 0.22 km^{2} (0.085 sq mi), at the northern end of Choiseul Island that includes a stretch of fringing coral reef.

=== World Heritage listed areas ===
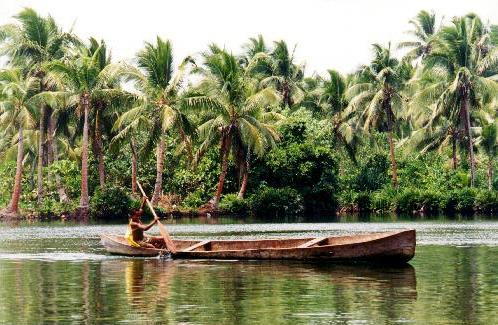
Tegano, East Rennell

As of April 2024, East Rennell is the only area in the Solomons listed by UNESCO as a World Heritage Site. East Rennell is the southern portion of Rennell Island, which is the largest raised coral atoll in the world. The area in East Rennell surrounding Lake Tegano (Te Nggano) contains many endemic species. Lake Tegano (Te Nggano) is a former lagoon and the largest lake on an island in the Pacific Ocean.

Other sites in the Solomons are on UNESCO's Tentative List, as important heritage and natural sites that are being considered for inclusion on the World Heritage List:

Site	Image	Location	Criteria	Area ha (acre)	Year of submission	Description
Marovo - Tetepare Complex		Western, Solomon Islands 8°29′S 158°04′E	Mixed (iii)(v)(vi)(vii)(viii)(ix)(x)		2008	
Tropical Rainforest Heritage of Solomon Islands		Choiseul, Guadalcanal, Makira-Ulawa, Western, Solomon Islands 7°08′00″S 156°57′00″E	Natural (vii)(ix)(x)		2008	

== Areas of high biodiversity and conservation value ==
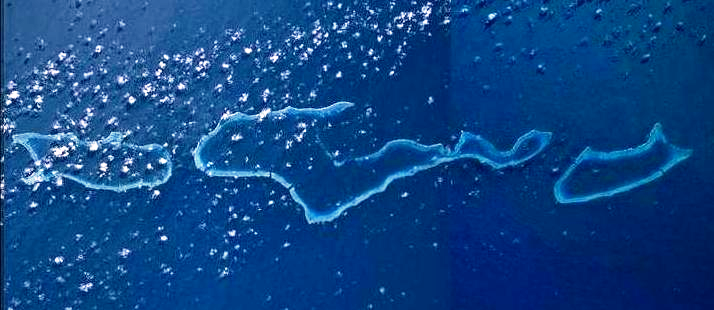
NASA picture of the three atolls forming the Indispensable Reef; North Reef is right

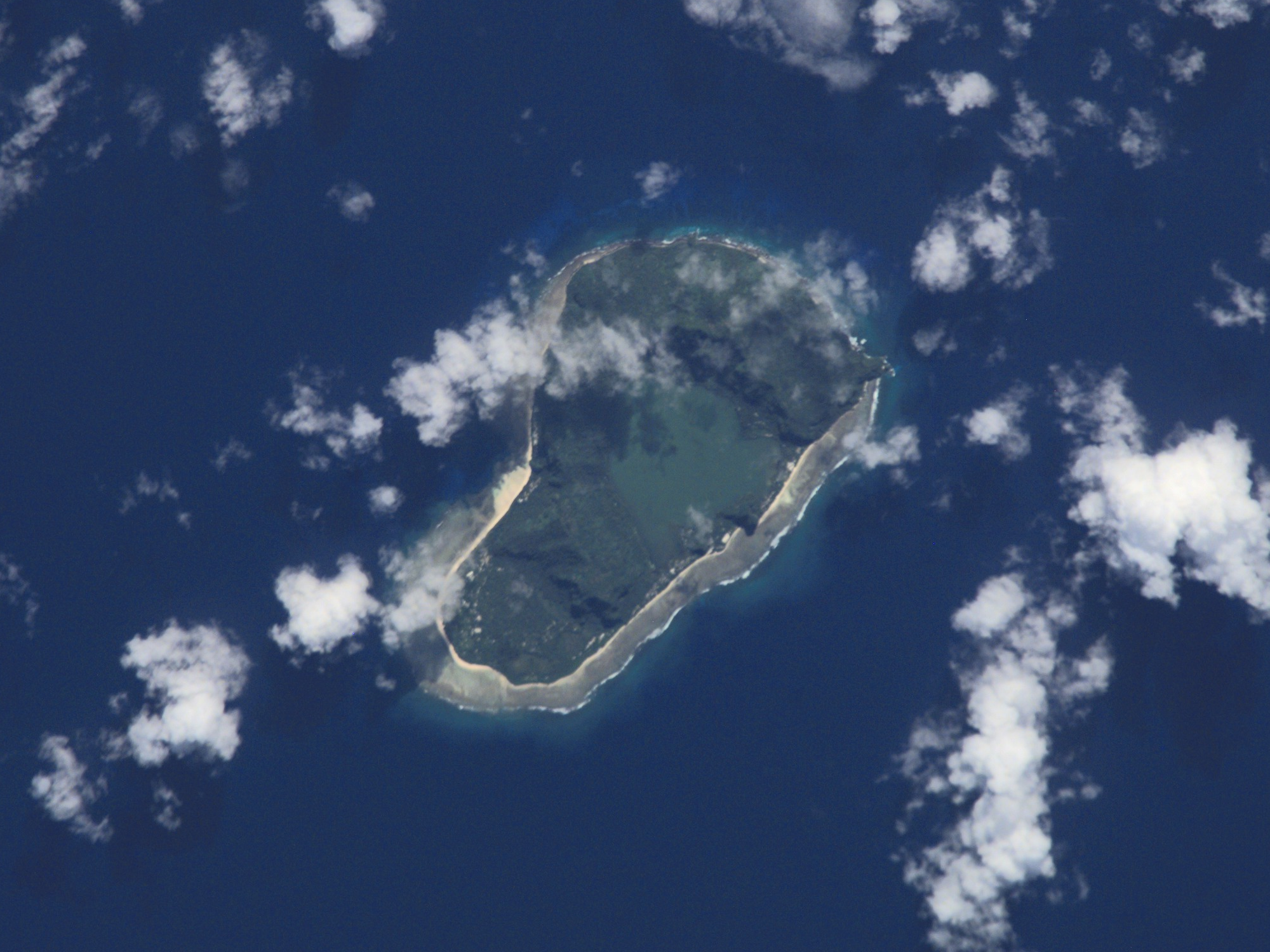
NASA picture of Tikopia

A total of 12 offshore sites and 53 inshore sites have been identified as Key Biodiversity Areas (KBAs) - areas of high biodiversity and conservation. The highest-scoring sites were Marovo Lagoon and the Arnavon Community Marine Conservation Area. The key offshore sites are Roncador Reef, Ontong Java Atoll, Tikopia Island, Nendö and Vanikoro in the Santa Cruz group and underwater seamounts, hydrothermal vents and submarine volcanoes, including Kavachi, an active submarine volcano located south of Vangunu Island.

KBAs include:

- Reef sites and lagoons within Western Province, including Kennedy Island (Kasolo Island), Tetepare Island, Marovo Lagoon (which covers 450 km^{2} (170 sq mi), the Zaira Resource Management Area on the western coast of Vangunu Island and New Georgia Island, and Mushroom Island at the edge of Roviana Lagoon, on the southern side of New Georgia.
- Reef sites and lagoons within Choiseul Province, including Zinoa Island which is located on the south-west side of Choiseul Island and includes the Zinoa Marine Conservation Area, which covers 150 ha or 1.5 km^{2} (0.58 sq mi) and consists of two small islands and associated reefs; Rabakel, a marine protected area (MPA), measuring 0.22 km^{2} (0.085 sq mi) at the northern end of Choiseul Island that includes a stretch of fringing coral reef; Moli Island, off the western side of Choiseul Island, which has a locally managed marine area (LMMA) that includes a stretch of fringing coral reef; and Muzo Island, which is located towards the southern end of Choiseul Island, fringed by a coral reef and sheltered from strong wave action by a barrier reef directly to the south.
- Reef sites and lagoons within Isabel Province, including the Arnavon Community Marine Conservation Area.
- Reef sites and lagoons within Malaita Province, including Langa Langa Lagoon or Akwalaafu; Lau Lagoon, the coral reef lagoon off the coast of Fanalei and Walande villages on the eastern side of Malaita Island; and Ndai or Dai, which is a small (3 by 7 kilometres (1.9 mi × 4.3 mi) elevated coral reef island 43 km (30 mi) off the northern end of Malaita Island.
- Reef sites in Rennell and Bellona Province, including Rennell Island, and the Indispensable Reefs, a chain of three large coral atolls in the Coral Sea spread over a length of 114 km (70 mi), approximately 1,500 km (930 mi) south of Rennell Island. The atolls enclose deep lagoons. North Reef has two narrow openings in the north and northwest, with no islets. The reef has a total area of 100 km^{2} (39 sq mi), including the lagoon and reef flat. Middle Reef has a total area of 300 km^{2} (120 sq mi). A small islet is located near the center of the reef. South Reef has a total area of 100 km^{2} (39 sq mi).
