= John Tuhaika =

Solomon Islands politician

John Tuhaika Jr.

Minister of Police, National Security and Correctional Services
- Incumbent
- Assumed office 17 May 2026

John Tuhaika Jr. is the current Minister for Police, National Security and Correctional Services in Solomon Islands. He has held positions within Solomon Islands government and is a current Member of Parliament for Rennell and Bellona Constituency.

== Early life and education ==
Tuhaika attended the University of South Pacific, where he studied a Bachelor in Economics and a Masters in Governance studies.

He also attended the Australian National University where he completed a Master of Laws in International Law, and the University of Singapore where he studied a Diploma in Regional Trade Policy.

== Political career ==
Tuhaika previously worked at the Ministry of Foreign Affairs and External Trade.

In the April 2024 national election, Tuhaika was elected as MP for Rennell and Bellona Constituency. He was later appointed Minister of Public Service (MPS) under the Government for National Unity and Transformation.

In December 2024, Tuhaika resigned as Minister of MPS in the lead up to a Motion of No Confidence against Prime Minister Jeremiah Manele. In May 2025, Tuhaika was sworn in as Minister for Traditional Governance, Peace and Ecclesiastical Affairs .

In May 2026, Tuhaika was sworn in as Minister for Police, National Security and Correctional Services.
