= Ministry of Provincial Government and Institutional Strengthening (Solomon Islands) =

Agency overview
- Jurisdiction: Government of Solomon Islands
- Minister responsible: Alfred Lazarus Rinah, Minister of Provincial Government and Institutional Strengthening
- Agency executive: Dr Derek Futaiasi, Permanent Secretary of Provincial Government and Institutional Strengthening
- Website: https://solomons.gov.sb/ministry-of-provincial-government-and-institutional-strengthening/

The Ministry of Provincial Government and Institutional Strengthening (MPGIS) is one of the ministries of the Solomon Islands government.

The ministry delivers government services to enable the establishment of provincial townships, assist in administering provincial elections and support resettlement planning. MPGIS also works to seek clarification and expansion of the roles of provincial governments.

== Organisation ==
MPGIS consists of the following divisions:

- Executive
- Internal Audit
- Finance
- Provincial Governance Strengthening Programme
- Provincial Governance
- Corporate Services
- MPGIS Monitoring
- Human Resources Development
