= Ministry of Foreign Affairs and External Trade (Solomon Islands) =

Agency overview
- Jurisdiction: Government of Solomon Islands
- Headquarters: Honiara, Solomon Islands
- Minister responsible: Ricky Nelson Houenipwela, Minister of Foreign Affairs and External Trade
- Agency executive: Collin Beck, Permanent Secretary of the Ministry of Foreign Affairs and External Trade
- Website: http://www.mfaet.gov.sb/about-us.html

The Ministry of Foreign Affairs and External Trade (MFAET) is one of the government ministries in the Solomon Islands government. The ministry is responsible for maintaining and promoting diplomatic relations, international cooperation and external trade with foreign nations.

The primary purpose of MFAET is to promote and safeguard the country's interests and standing overseas by maintaining and strengthening relations with other states and International and Regional Organizations.

== Organization ==
Headquartered in Honiara, MFAET consists of three main departments; Foreign Affairs, External Trade and Corporate Services.

These three departments, in addition to the various diplomatic missions abroad, enable the Ministry to serve as a first point of contact in the Solomon Islands’ global engagement.

MFAET currently operates missions in the following countries:

- Cuba
- China
- India
- Republic of Indonesia
- United Arab Emirates
- Belgium
- Australia
- Fiji
- New Zealand
- Papua New Guinea

MFEAT also has permanent delegations with the following multilateral organisations:

- UNESCO
- United Nations
- European Union
