= Royal Solomon Islands Police Force =

Law enforcement agency

- Patch

- Emblem
- Motto: To provide a safe and peaceful Solomon Islands by strengthening relationships with the community

Agency overview
- Formed: c. 1974
- Preceding agencies: Solomon Islands Police Force (1954); Solomon Islands Defence Force (1940)

Jurisdictional structure
- National agency: Solomon Islands
- Operations jurisdiction: Solomon Islands
- Governing body: Ministry of Police, National Security and Correctional Services
- General nature: Local civilian police

Operational structure
- Headquarters: Honiara, Solomon Islands
- Ministry of Police, National Security and Correctional Services responsible: Hon. John Tuhaika
- Agency executive: Ian Vaevaso, Commissioner of Police

Website
- www.rsipf.gov.sb

The Royal Solomon Islands Police Force (RSIPF) is the national police force of Solomon Islands and in January 2015 had an establishment of approximately 1,153 officers and 43 police stations across the country.

Solomon Islands has no military organisation with this provided in the past by the abolished paramilitary wing of the RSIPF known as the Police Field Force (later Special Task and Rescue). The Regional Assistance Mission to Solomon Islands (RAMSI) withdrew in June 2017 handing full control of policing back to the RSIPF.

== History ==
- 1893 – The British Solomon Islands Protectorate was established and in 1899 encompassed the German Solomon Islands.
- 1922 – Protectorate constabulary strength increased to 153 officers by 1922.
- 1940 – During the war, most police became Coastwatchers including the heroic Jacob C. Vouza.
- 1945 – The armed Constabulary was reconstituted following the war.
- 1950 – The police band was formed.
- 1954 – A Queen's Regulation issued renamed the force as the Solomon Islands Police Force – approved establishment was eight commissioned officers and 200 sub-officers and constables.
- 1974 – All police stations were linked by a radio network.
- 1975 – John Holloway is appointed the first RSIPF Commissioner of Police in July 1975, until 1982.
- 1978 – ‘Royal’ was added to the title of the police force.
- 2003 – Between 1998 and 2003 unresolved land issues lead to significant civil conflict, the tensions, and a major break-down of law and order. On the request of the Governor-General, an international response was organised, the Regional Assistance Mission to Solomon Islands (RAMSI), led by Australia, which restored peace arriving on 24 July 2003. The RSIPF was disarmed following the ethnic conflict, and RAMSI temporarily provided the armed policing and response capability. RAMSI subsequently rebuilt local capacity in the areas of police, corrections and justice and gradually transferred its powers to local authorities.
- 2013 – The Military Component of RAMSI (Combined Task Force-CTF) withdrew in mid 2013 and by January 2015 the police component of RAMSI had reduced to approximately 152 officers.
- 2014 – Following Cyclone Ita RSIPF provided a lead response where an estimated 52,000 people were affected by floods and 23 people died. Initially over 10,000 people were displaced and relocated in 30 evacuation centres, largely in Honiara. Approximately 2,000 people required longer-term assistance as a result of lost or severely damaged homes.
- 2015 – Efforts underway to rearm the RSIPF.
- 2023 – In July, a police cooperation agreement was signed between Governments of Solomon Islands and the Peoples Republic of China, for three years including training, equipment supply, riots, communication systems, autopsy laboratory, police academy, and advisory support. This extended to drones and uniforms, whilst the Australian government was concerned about continuing as the country's major security partner. By December 2024, the Australian government increased policing support to the country.

== Structure ==
The RSIPF is headed by the Commissioner of Police who reports to the Minister of Police, National Security, Correctional Services. Historically, several Commissioners have been expatriates under contract. On 22 December 2006, an Australian Federal Police officer, Shane Castles, then serving as the Commissioner under a contract funded by the Australian government was declared by the Solomon Islands Government to be an "undesirable immigrant" while he was out of the country and was not allowed to return.

The RSIPF structure includes two deputy commissioners. The Deputy Commissioner Operations manages the portfolios of 'National Capital and Crime Prevention' and 'Provincial Policing', both of which are supervised by assistant commissioners. The Deputy Commissioner National Security and Operations Support managed the portfolios of 'National Operations' and 'Corporate Support', again both of which are supervised by assistant commissioners.

The RSIPF Police Media Unit reports directly to the Chief of Staff.

The RSIPF Professional Standards and Internal Investigations Unit monitors police discipline and performance.

In 2013 the Solomon Islands Government approved the staged, limited rearmament of the RSIPF including the Police Response Team (PRT) and the Close Personal Protection (CPP) Unit. In May 2017, the RSIPF was rearmed with pistols and shotguns with 125 officers from the PRT and CPP trained to use firearms. In 2022, Australia donated sixty Daniel Defense MK18 rifles and provided training to PRT officers.

Under the Police Act 2013, the RSIPF is also responsible for fire services and maintains a fire service in Honiara and the major provincial capitals.

=== Ranks ===
Police ranks and Insignia
Epaulette Insignia										
Rank	Commissioner	Deputy commissioner	Assistant commissioner	Chief superintendent	Provincial Police Commander; Chief superintendent	Superintendent	Inspector	Staff sergeant	Sergeant	Constable

== Maritime Department ==
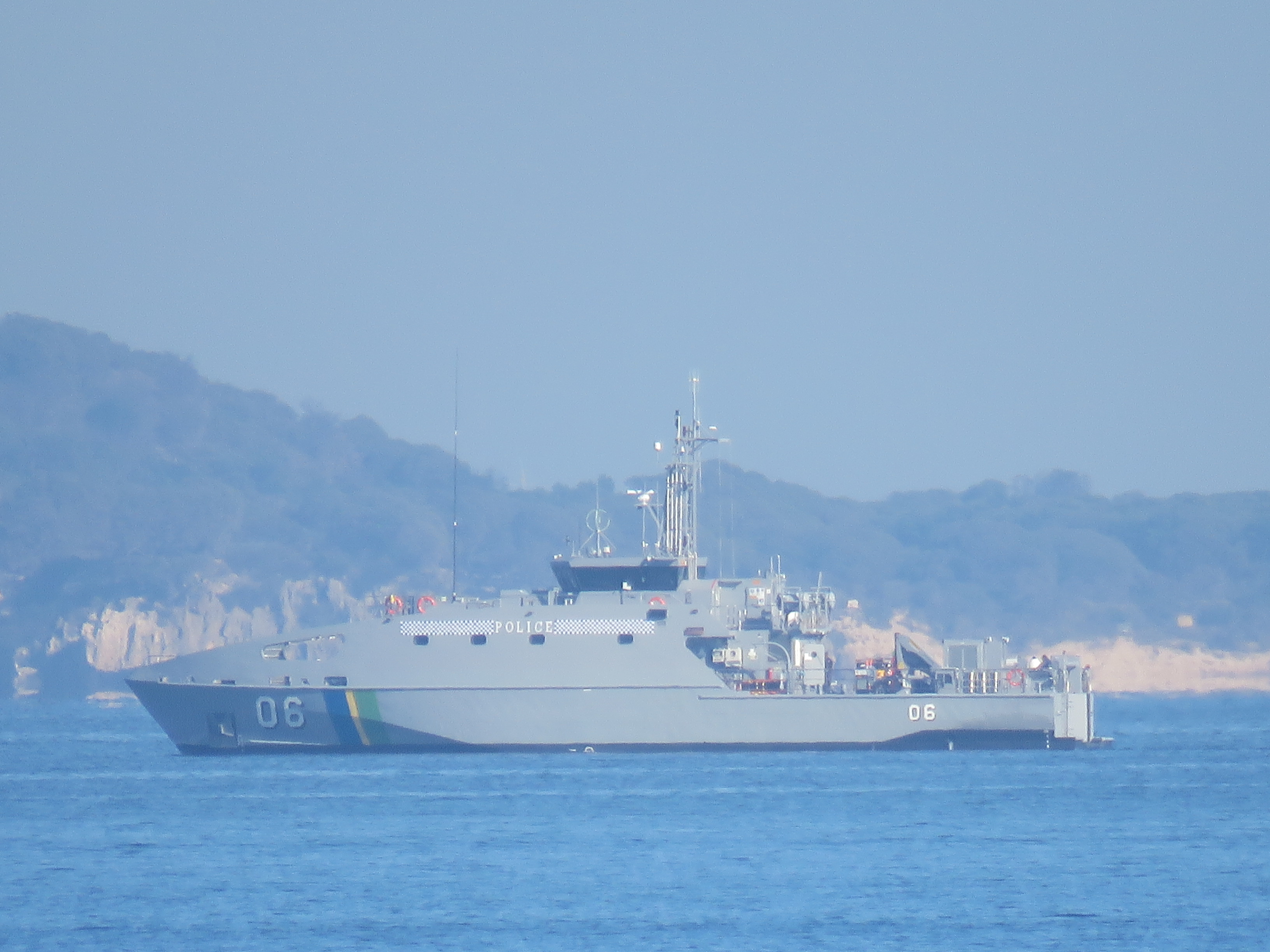
RSIPV Taro in 2021

The RSIPF Maritime Department provides the RSIPF's maritime capability and conducts operational patrols and patrols of the Exclusive Economic Zone (EEZ) and Solomon Islands Borders for fisheries, immigration and national security purposes. RSIPF Maritime operates the one Pacific-class patrol boat, RSIPV Auki (04), and the new Guardian-class patrol boat RSIPV Gizo (05). The Gizo replaced the other Pacific-class patrol boat, RSIPV Lata (03), when it was commissioned on 19 December 2019, and when the second Guardian-class vessel enters service in 2022, the Auki will presumably also be replaced and disposed of.

Australia started delivering Guardian class patrol vessels to replace the Pacific class vessels in 2018. Australia committed to provide two new vessels to replace the RSIPF vessels. The then-Commissioner Matthew Varley announced on 26 January 26, 2019 of the expansion of the Force's mooring space, to accommodate the larger Guardian class vessels, which would be undertaken in 2019.

In 2020 and 2021, Australia provided a squadron of several 9.2 metres (30 ft) in-shore patrol craft.

The department acts as the country's de facto navy. In June 2023, MD officers were rearmed with Glock pistols. In December 2023, the two Guardian class patrol boats were armed with FN Herstal M2 12.7 mm (0.50 in) machine guns.

Current Vessels	Origin	Class	Type	Notes
RSIPV Gizo (05)	Australia	Guardian Class	Patrol Boat	Commissioned 19 December 2019
RSIPV Taro (06)	Australia	Guardian Class	Patrol Boat	Commissioned 9 May 2021
Former Vessels	Origin	Class	Type	Notes
RSIPV Lata (03)	Australia	Pacific Class	Patrol Boat	Replaced by RSIPV Gizo
RSIPV Auki (04)	Australia	Pacific Class	Patrol Boat	Replaced by RSIPV Taro

== RSIPF Commissioners ==
Name	Term of Office		Notes
Name	Start	End	Notes
John Holloway	August 1975	1982	
Sir Fred Soaki	1982	1995	
Morton Sireheti	1995	1997	
Frank Short CBE	July 1997	June 1999	
Rererangi Hika	1999	2000	
Morton Siriheti	July 2000	December 2002	
Bill Morrell (UK)	28 January 2003	March 2005	
Shane Castles (AFP)	April 2005	December 2006	
(vacant)	December 2006	15 May 2007	
Mohammed Jahir Khan (Fiji)	15 May 2007	May 2008	
Peter Marshall (Acting) (NZ)	May 2008	March 2009	
Peter Marshall	March 2009	7 February 2011	
Walter Kola (Acting)	7 February 2011	2 May 2012	
John Lansley (UK)	2 May 2012	2 May 2013	
Juanita Matanga (Acting)	3 May 2013	29 August 2014	
Frank Prendergast (AFP)	29 August 2014	25 January 2017	
Matthew Varley (AFP)	25 January 2017	29 November 2019	
Mostyn Mangau (Acting)	29 November 2019	22 July 2020	
Mostyn Mangau	23 July 2020	31 December 2025	
Mathias Lenialu (Acting)	1 January 2026	23 April 2026	
Ian Vaevaso	24 April 2026	12 July 2026	
James Aitorea	13 July 2026	Present	
