= Telecommunications in Solomon Islands =

Communications in Solomon Islands.

== Telephones ==
Landline

- 2009: 13,000 subscribers
- 2010: 8,400 subscribers
- 2018: 7,430 subscribers

Mobile cellular:

- 2009: 55,000 subscribers, 20% penetration, 20%coverage
- 2018: 482,209 subscribers, 80% penetration, 95% coverage

Telecom operators:

- Our Telekom (1988). Operates in nine Provinces
- bmobile (2010). Operates in four Provinces

Telephone system:
GSM mobile phone network covering all provincial capitals along with several other townships and villages and a landline system covering all provincial capitals and some townships.

International dial code:+677

- Landline number: 5-digits
- Mobile number: 7-digits
  - Telekom: 7xx xxxx
  - bmobile: 8xx xxxx

== Connectivity ==
International

- Satellite: Leased geostationary and constellation Ka, Ku band satellites
- Undersea fibre: In January 2020, Solomon Islands was connected to Sydney, Australia via the Coral Seas Cable System (CS2)
- Earth stations: based in Honiara and Gizo

Domestic

- Satellite: Leased, bi-directional geostationary satellites are used to connect Provinces too remote for microwave and fibre
- Undersea fibre: Interchange Cable Network 2 (ICN2S) In February 2020 as part of the Coral Seas Cable System project, Honiara (Guadalcanal Province) was also connected to Auki (Mataita Province), Taro (Choiseul Province) and Noro (Western Province)
- DSL, ADSL: To homes and businesses
- Fixed Wireless: Honiara
- Mobile: 2G/3G/4GLTE

== Radio ==
Radio broadcast stations: AM 1, FM 4 Paoa FM, ZFM100, Wan FM, and Barava FM, shortwave 1 (2002). The Solomon Islands Broadcasting Corporation, founded in 1976, transmits regular programming.

Radio Receivers: 57,000 (1997) In addition to regular broadcast stations, several shortwave utility station networks exist, such as the Church of Melanesia network.

== Television ==
TTV is Solomon Islands' only television network and is a wholly owned subsidiary of Solomon Telekom Co. Ltd. (STCL). STCL operates under the brand name - Our Telekom.

TTV transmits in digital HD and analogue and is a free-to-air, commercial, terrestrial television network, located in the capital, Honiara.

History: The first television broadcast was made possible in July 1992 by STCL who downlinked the Barcelona Summer Olympics utilising the satellite antennas used to relay international telephone calls and a small TV transmitter as an experiment.

2006: ONE News leased the STCL owned transmitters to broadcast a local channel until 2011 when it went out of business.

2008 (March): Telekom Television Ltd was formed

2016: HD services launched (FTA DVB-T). Commenced broadcasting National Parliament live to air on TTV ONE.

2019: Broadcast three analogue SD and sixteen 1080i/50 HD digital (DVB-T) channels in the VHF/UHF frequency bands. The HD channels, available in Honiara, are a mixture of overseas sport, news and entertainments channels. Two of the TTV branded analogue SD channels (TTV 1, TTV 2) are distributed to five major locations in the Solomons: Gizo, Noro, Munda, Auki and Lata. Distribution is via satellite and microwave links.

Standards: TTV conforms to the Australian television frequencies for both analogue and digital transmissions and production (1080i/50).

Channels: TTV branded channels include: TTV ONE, TTV TWO and TTV THREE. TTV ONE is the main commercial channel and carries a mixture of local and international sport, news and entertainment programming.

Online: TTV is also streamed Online (as programme rights allow) and is accessible via the Our Telekom mobile network throughout the Solomons. The service is Geoblocked to the Solomons.

Televisions: 3,000 (1997). Estimated viewership: 35,000 (2017)

== Internet ==
Internet Service Providers (ISPs):
Solomon Telekom: https://telekom.com.sb/
McPacific: http://www.mc-pacific.com/satellite.html
SATSOL: https://satsol.net/

People First Network: (PFnet) operate a community email network with 17 rural access points (Apr 2005) https://web.archive.org/web/20010415150953/http://www.peoplefirst.net.sb/General/PFnet.htm PFnet is also establishing a VSAT network of distance learning centres in rural community schools under an EU-funded project http://www.peoplefirst.net.sb/dlcp It is hoped each host school will contribute to the Wikipedia or create their own wikis.

Country code (Top level domain): SB
