= Republic of Fiji Military Forces =

Combined military forces of Fiji

- Mataivalu ni Republic of Viti (Fijian); फ़िजी गणराज्य के सैन्य बल (Hindi); Fiji Ganarajya ke sainya bal (Fiji Hindi)
- Logo of the RFMF

- Flag of the RFMF
- Founded: 1920
- Service branches: Fiji Infantry Regiment; Republic of Fiji Navy
- Headquarters: Suva
- Website: rfmf.mil.fj

Leadership
- Commander-in-chief: Ratu Naiqama Lalabalavu
- Minister for Defence: Pio Tikoduadua
- Commander RFMF: Major General Jone Kalouniwai

Personnel
- Conscription: No
- Active personnel: 6,500
- Reserve personnel: Approx 6,200
- Deployed personnel: 541

Expenditure
- Budget: US $50.1 million (2022)
- Percent of GDP: 1.23%

Industry
- Foreign suppliers: Austria; China; Germany; Finland; Israel; Italy; Russia; Singapore; South Korea; United Kingdom; United States

Related articles
- Ranks: Military ranks of Fiji

The Republic of Fiji Military Forces (RFMF, formerly the Royal Fiji Military Forces until 1987 when the Dominion of Fiji was overthrown) is the armed forces of the Pacific island nation of Fiji. With a total manpower of about 6,500 active soldiers and approximately 6,200 reservists, it is one of the smallest militaries in the world and the third largest in the South Pacific region. The Ground Force is organised into one engineer and six infantry battalions.

The first two regular battalions of the Fiji Infantry Regiment are traditionally stationed overseas on peacekeeping duties; the 1st Battalion has been posted to Lebanon, Iraq, Syria, and East Timor under the command of the UN, while the 2nd Battalion is stationed in Sinai with the MFO. Peacekeepers income represents an important source of income for Fiji. The 3rd Battalion is stationed in the capital, Suva, and the remaining three are spread throughout the islands.

== Leadership ==
- Commander in Chief: President Ratu Naiqama Lalabalavu
- Minister for Defense: Pio Tikoduadua

| Commander of the RFMF | Rank | Branch |
|---|---|---|
| Jone Kalouniwai | Major General | Fiji Infantry Regiment |
| Deputy Commander of the RFMF | Rank | Branch |
| Humphrey Tawake | Commodore | Fiji Navy |
| Chief of Staff RFMF | Rank | Branch |
| Sapenafa Motufaga | Brigadier General | Fiji Infantry Regiment |

== Organisation ==
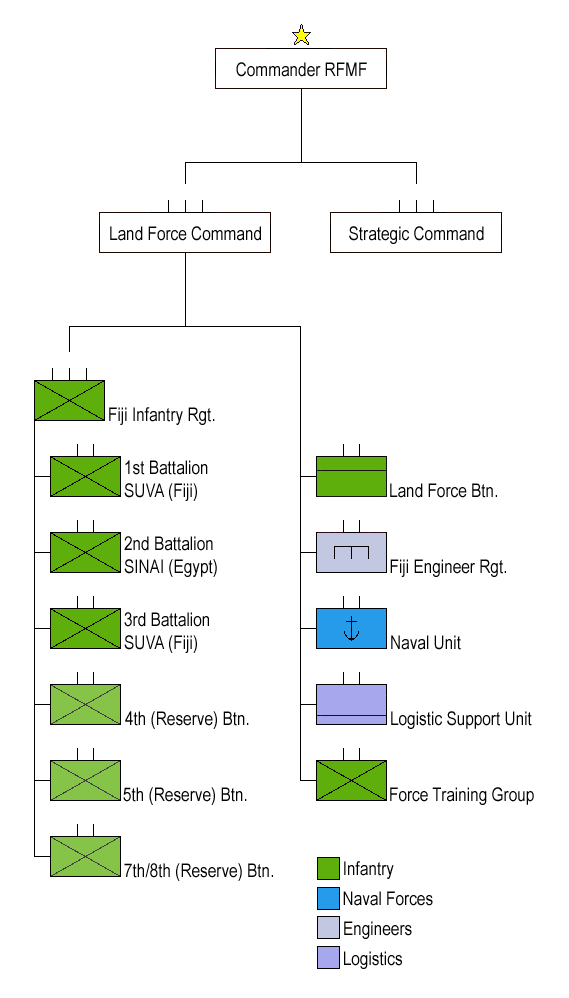
Structure of the military of Fiji

- Commander-in-Chief – The President of the Republic is ex officio Commander-in-Chief of the Military Forces.
- Commander RFMF – The Commander RFMF is of two-star rank. He is assisted by the Deputy Commander and the Chief of Staff, who are responsible for Strategic Command and Land Force Command. The current Commander is Major General Jone Kalouniwai who was preceded by Rear Admiral Viliame Naupoto who was appointed following the resignation of Brigadier Mosese Tikoitoga on 2 August 2015. Tikoitoga succeeded the previous Commander and former Head of Government Commodore Voreqe (Frank) Bainimarama after fifteen years of service as Commander and a total of thirty-nine years of active military service.
  - Strategic Command – Strategic Command is responsible for all of the long term and strategic concerns of the RFMF, including welfare, legal issues, sustainability issues etc.
  - Land Force Command – Land Force Command is the operational organisation of the RFMF, and is responsible for all of the main units:
    - HQ Land Force Commander Lieutenant Colonel Jone Kalouniwai
    - Naval Unit
    - Fiji Infantry Regiment
      - Regular Force
        - 1st Battalion
        - 2nd Battalion
        - 3rd Battalion
      - Territorial Force
        - 4th Battalion
        - 5th Battalion
        - 7th/8th Battalion
    - Fiji Engineer Regiment
    - Logistic Support Unit
    - Force Training Group
    - Presidential Palace Guards
    - Fiji Military Forces Band

=== Assault Rifles ===
- AK-47

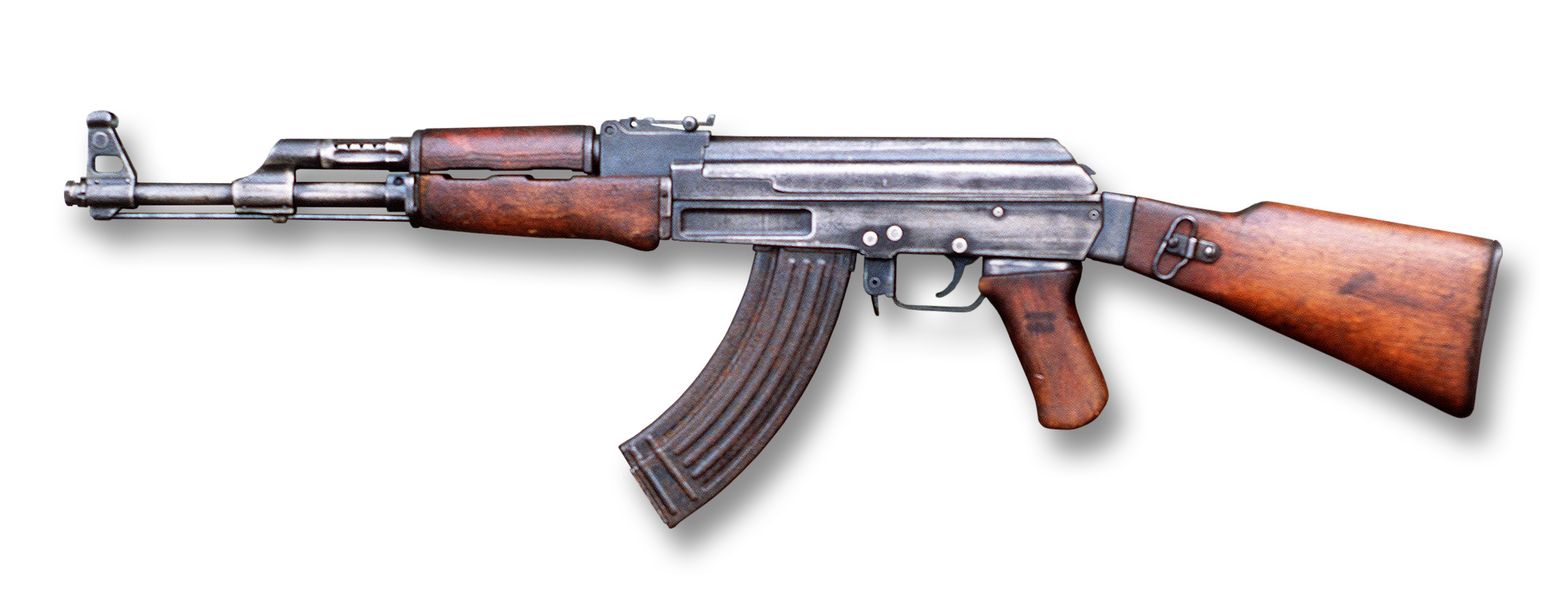

- Daewoo Precision Industries K1

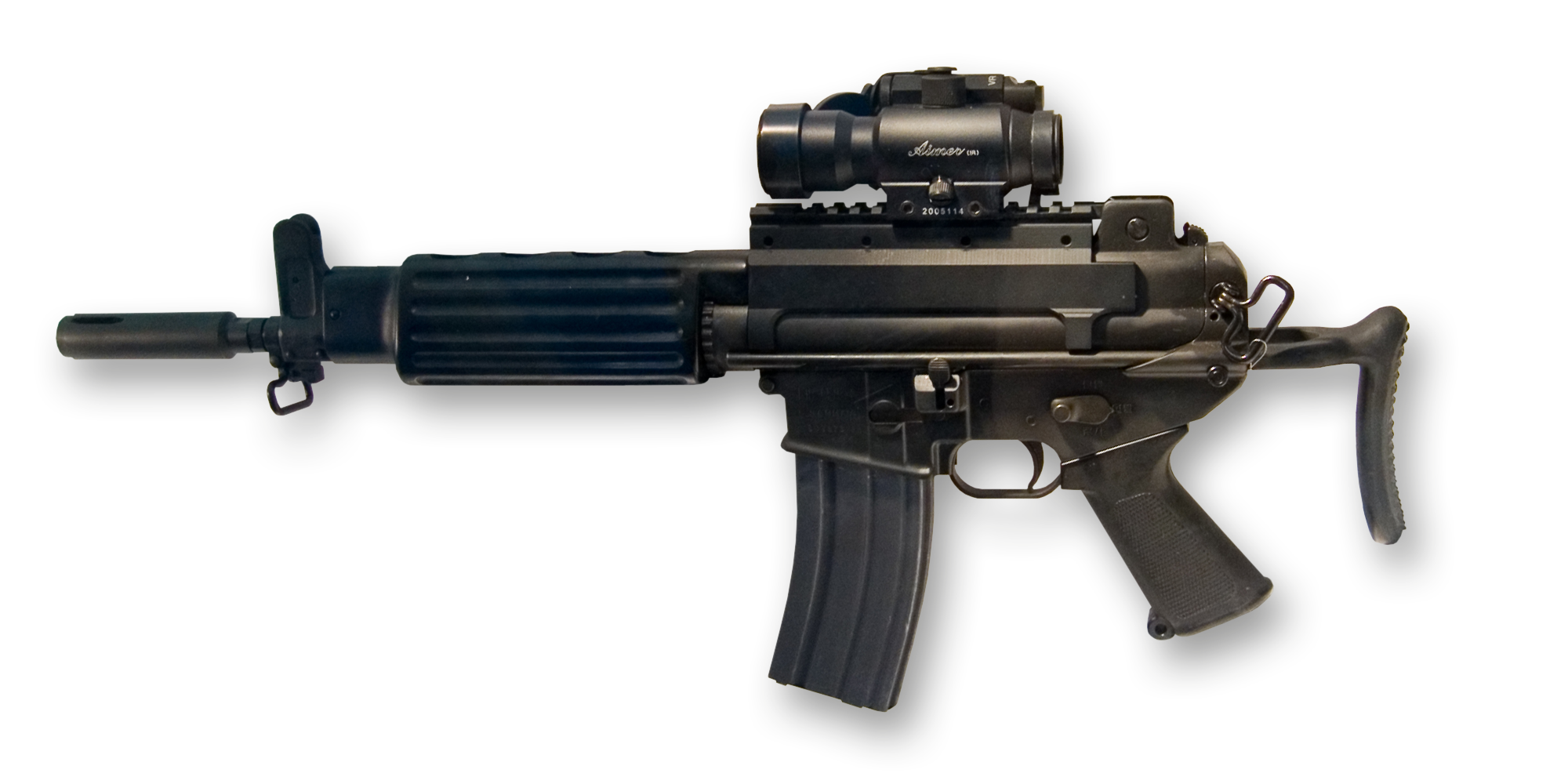

- AK-74

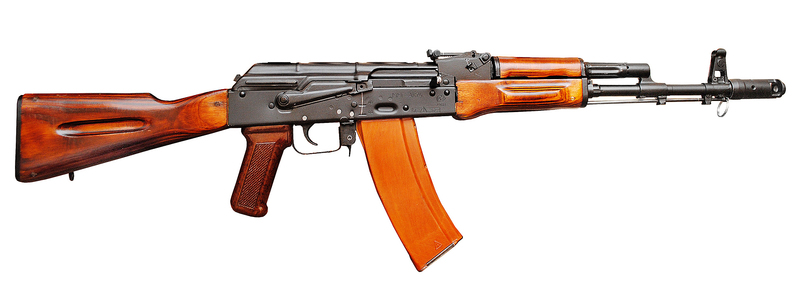

- AK-101

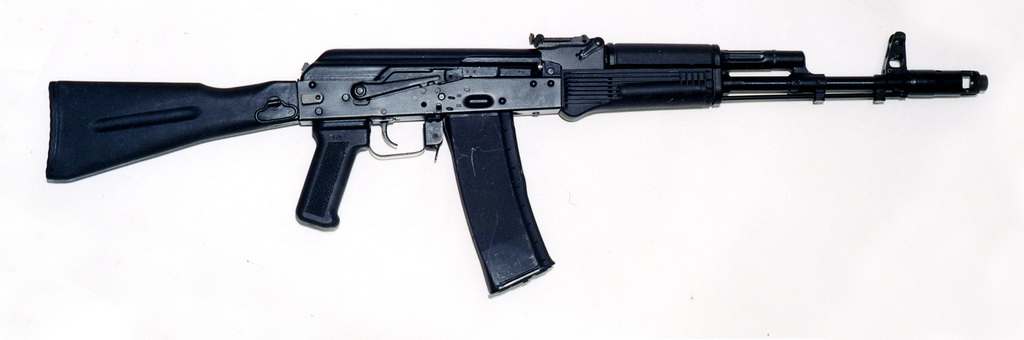

- M4 carbine standard issue

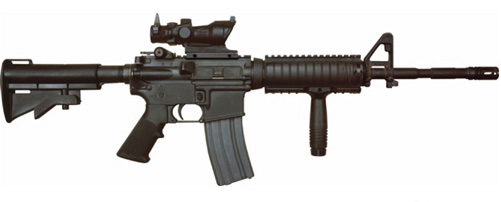

- M16A2 rifle

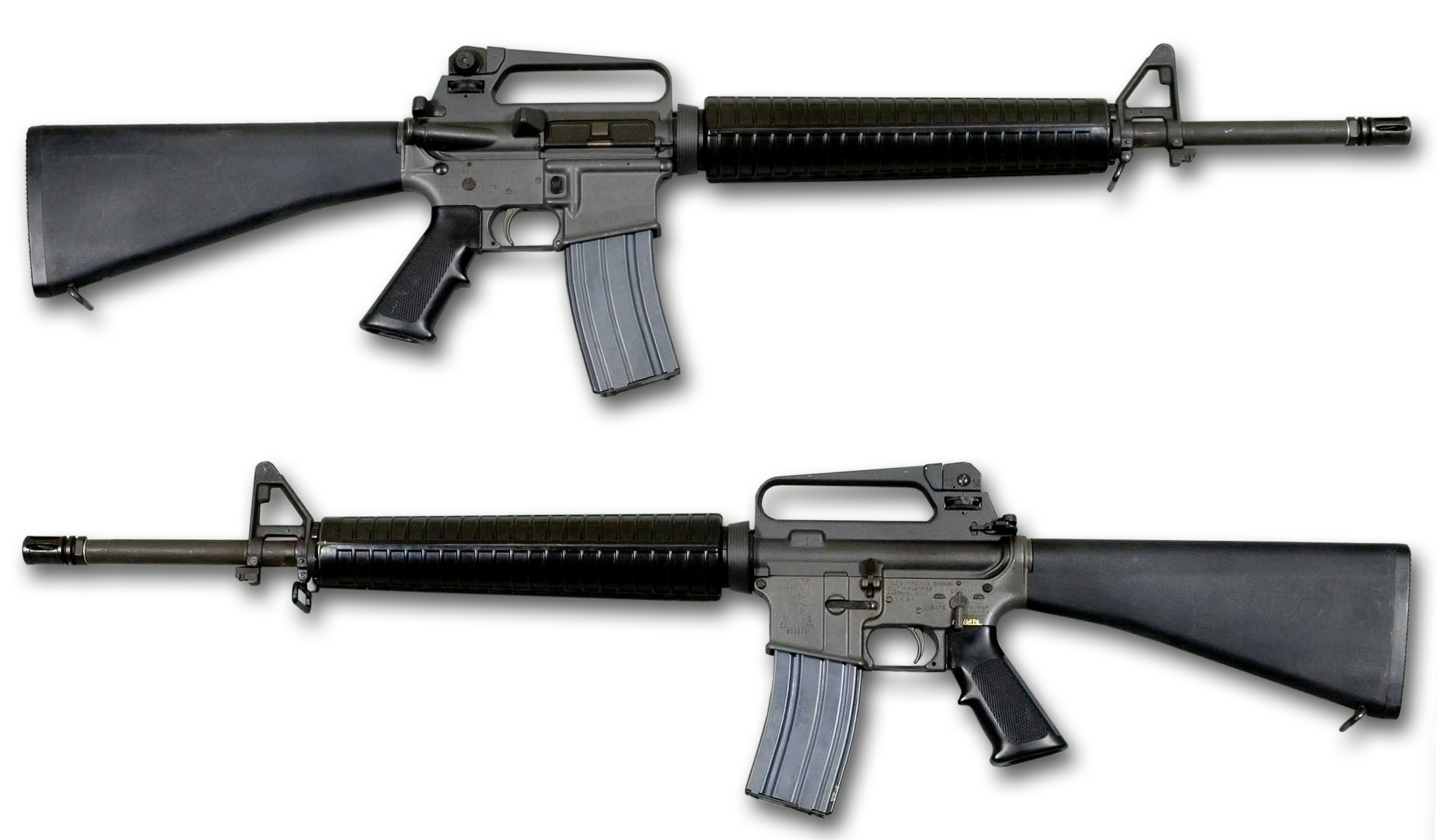

- CAR-15

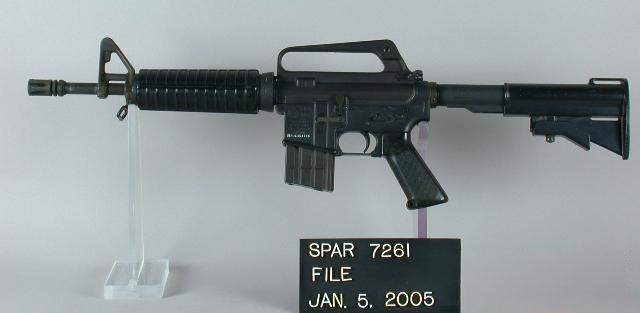

- Daewoo K2

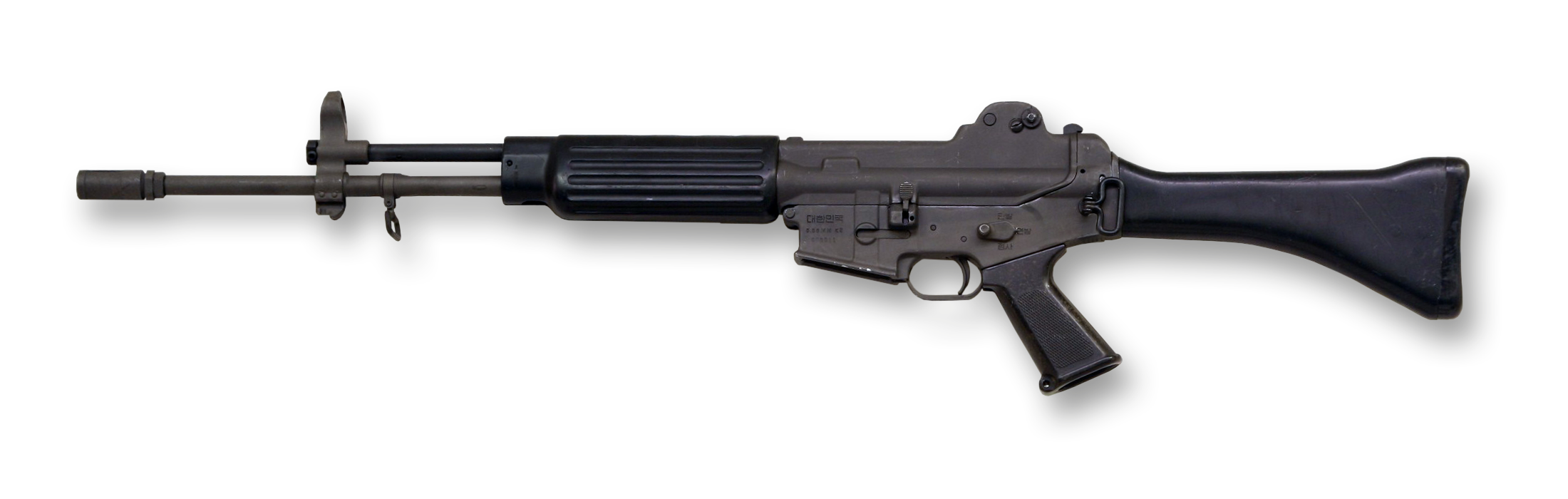

- FN FAL

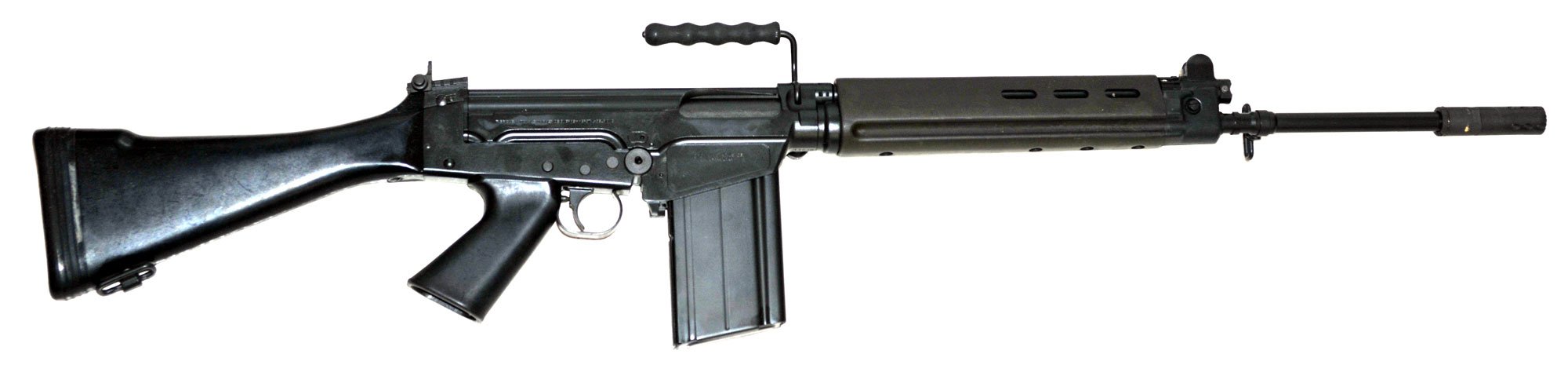

- IWI Galil

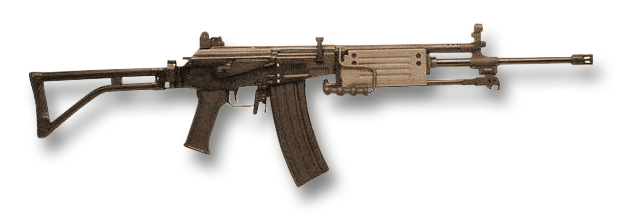

=== Pistols ===
- M45A1

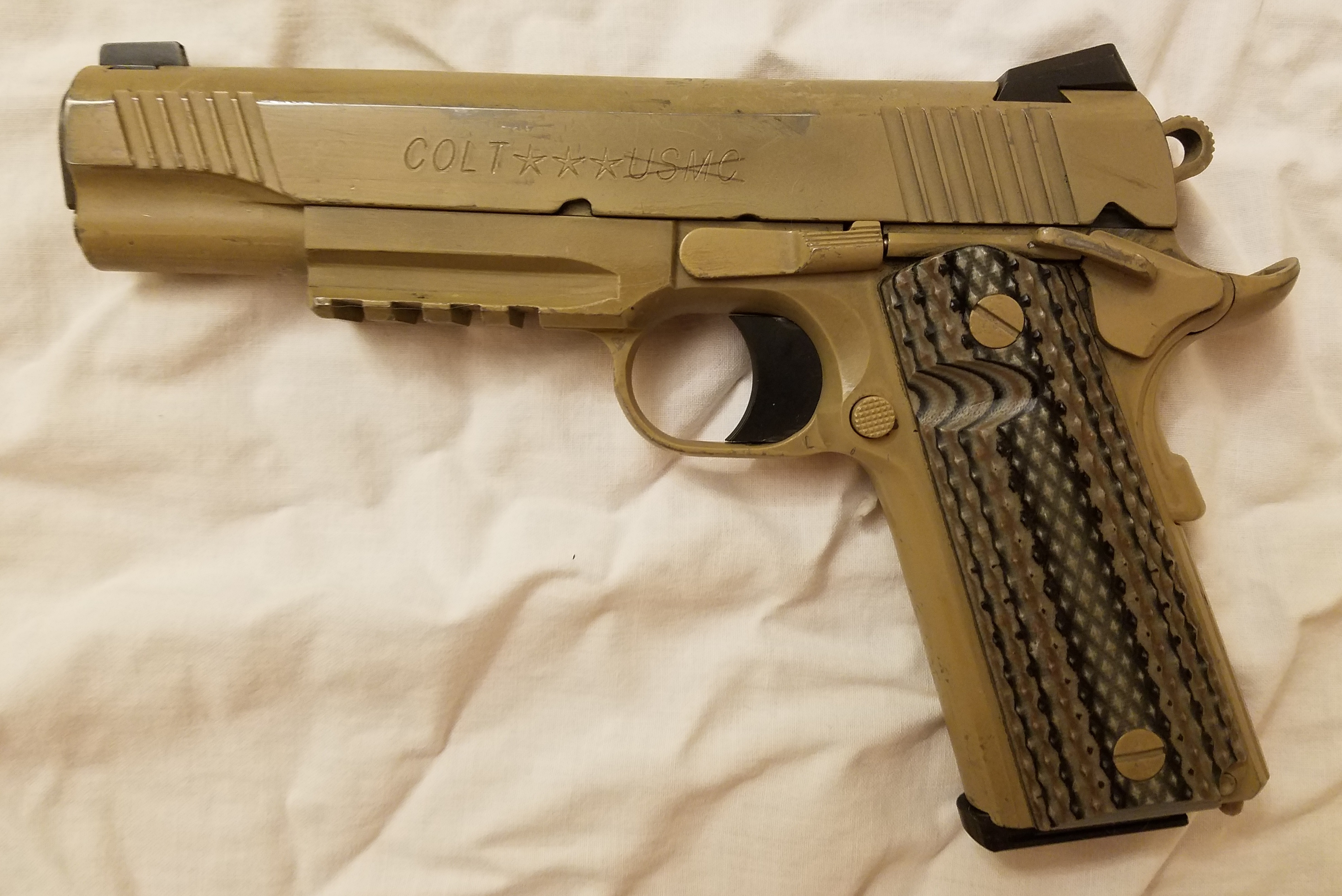

- Glock

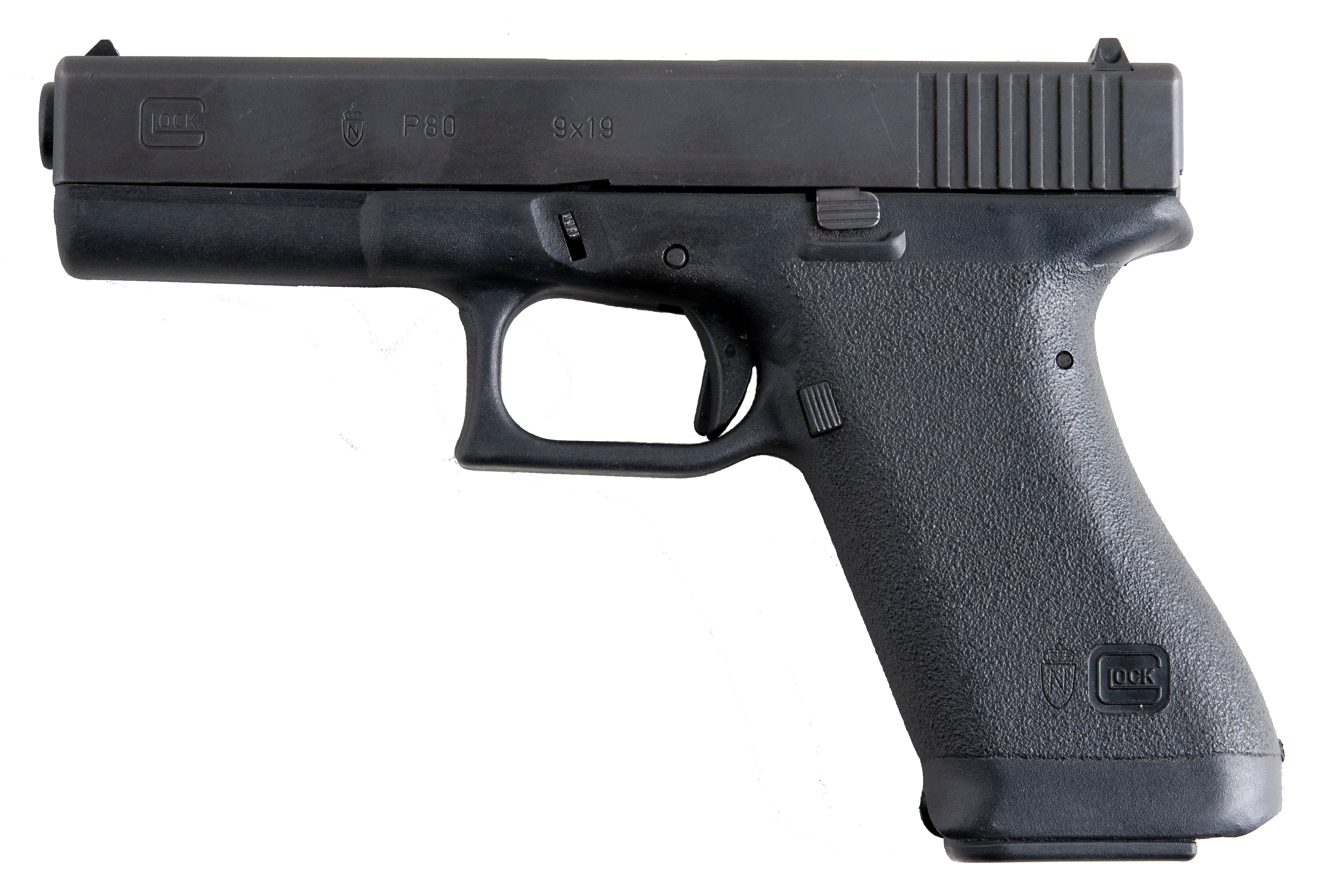

- Beretta M9
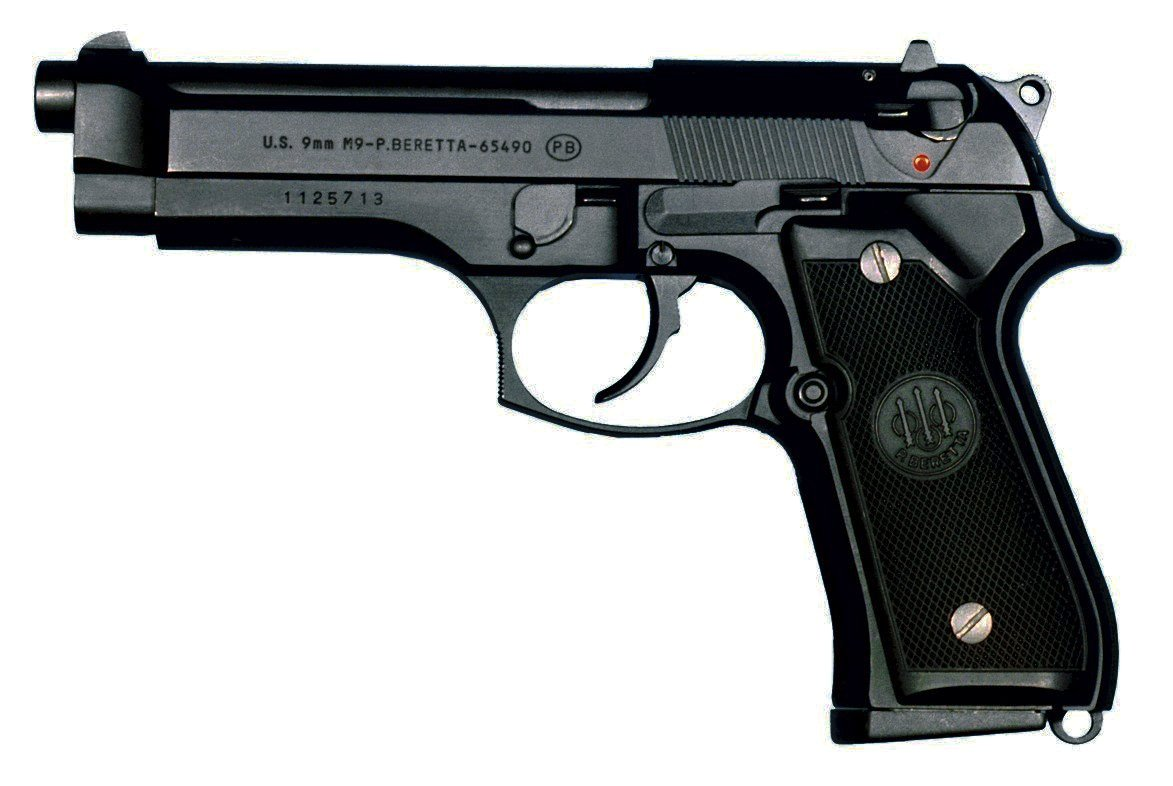
- M1911

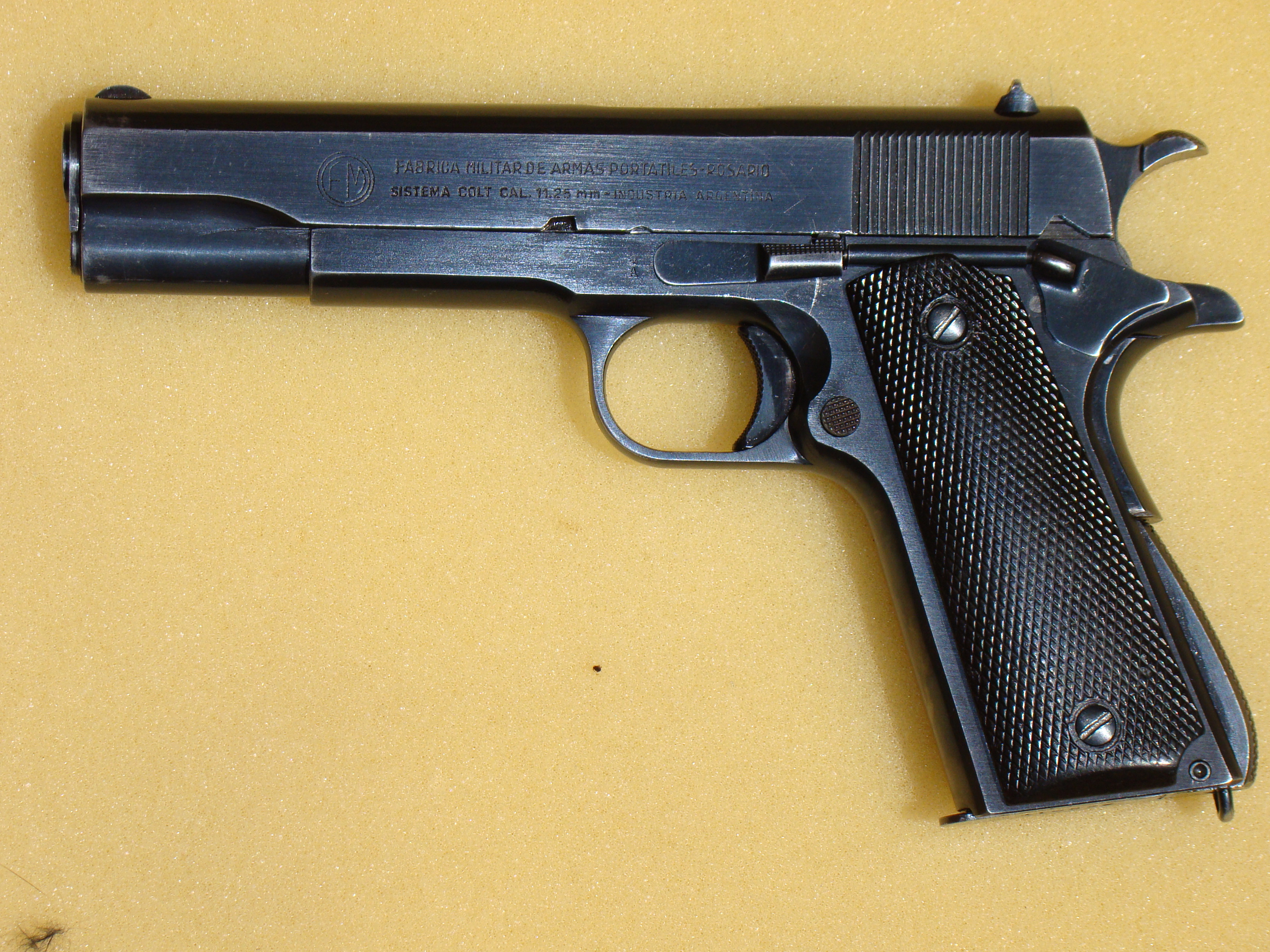

- Makarov PM

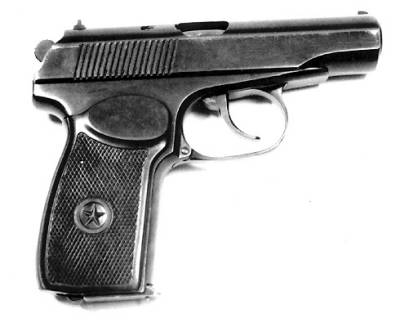

=== Sniper Rifles ===
- Pindad SPR-2
- Parker Hale M85

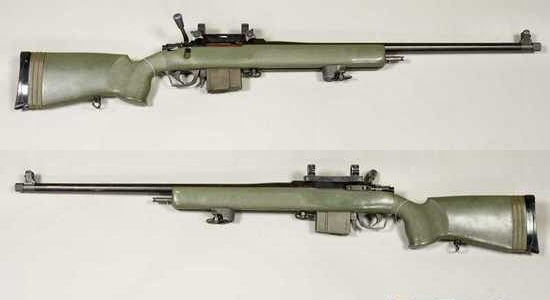

=== Sub Machine Gun ===
- Uzi

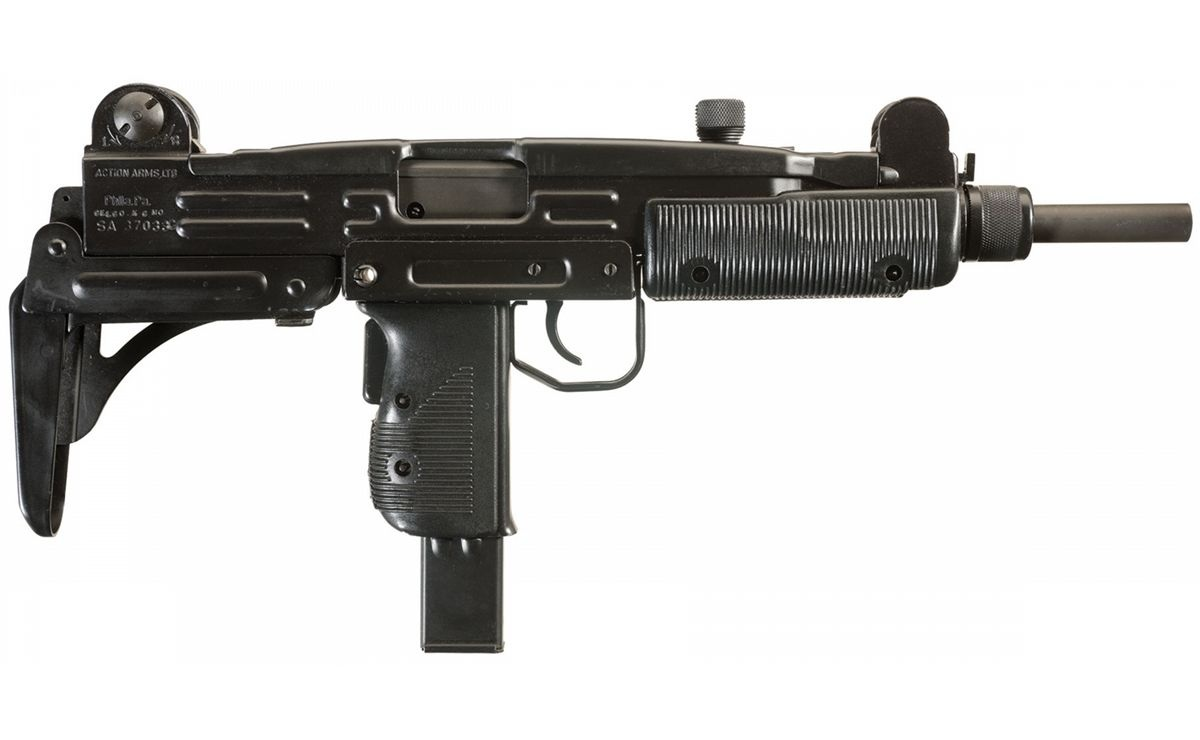

- Heckler & Koch MP5

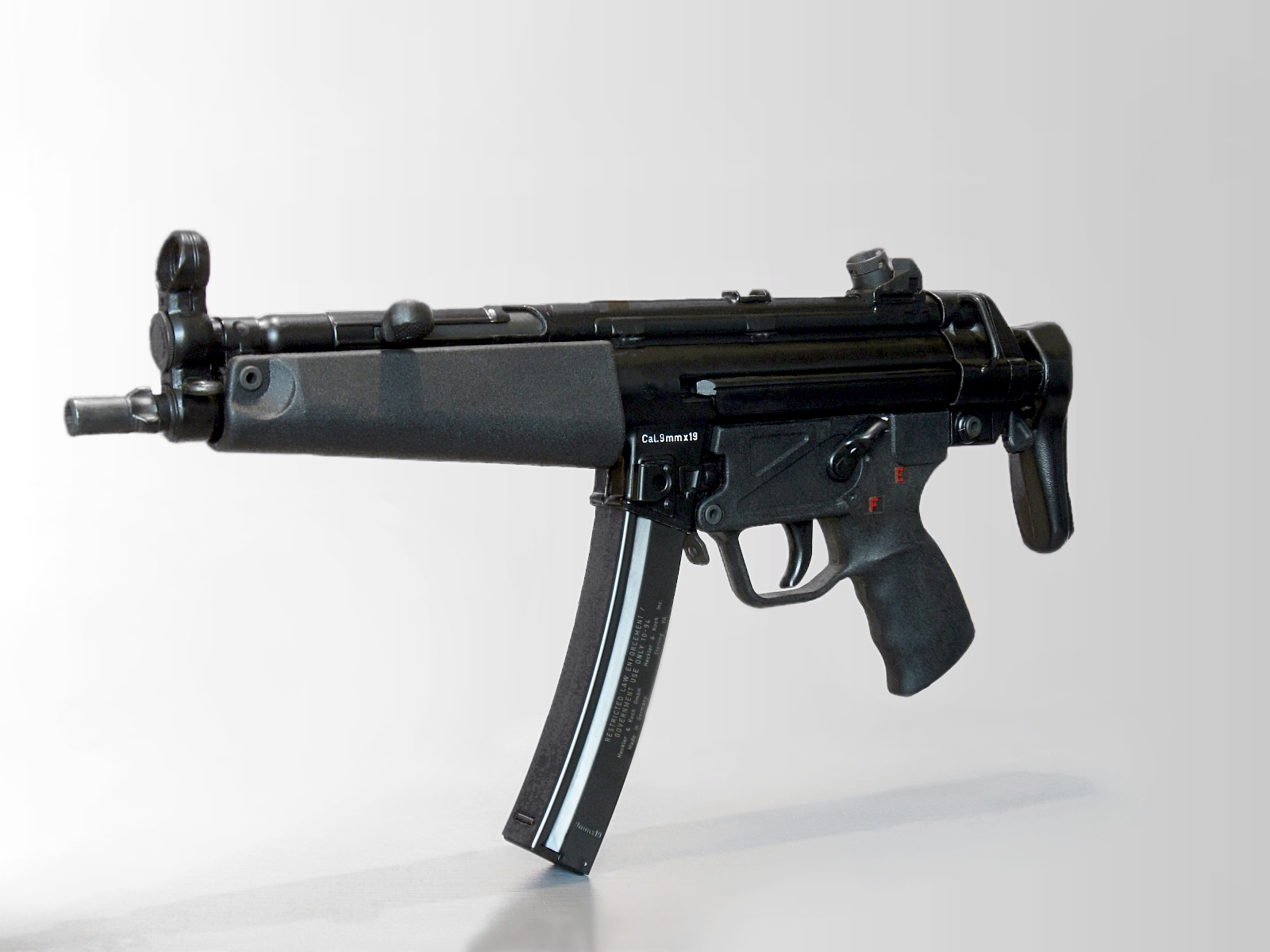

=== Machine Guns ===
- Daewoo K3

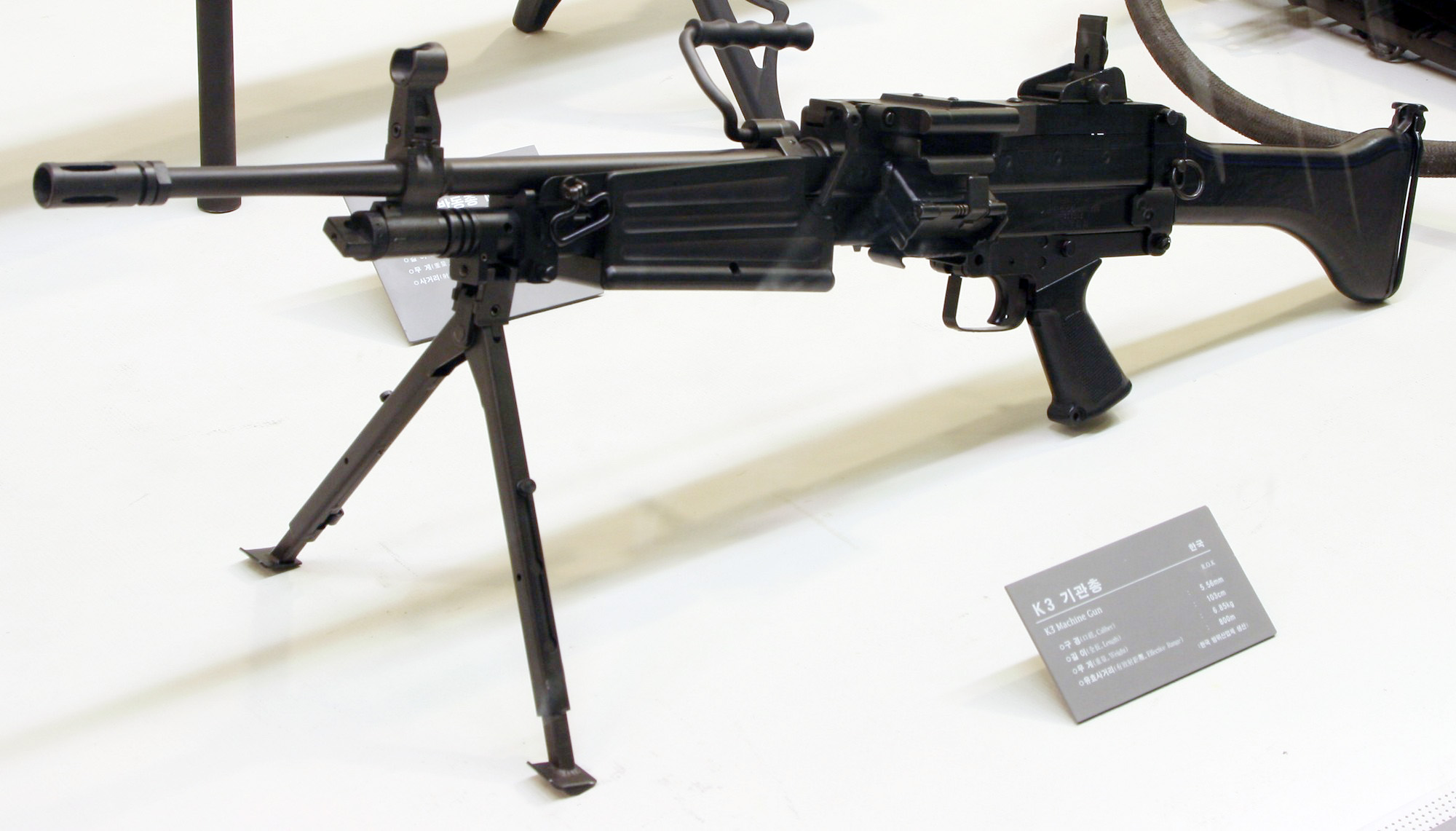

- RPK-201

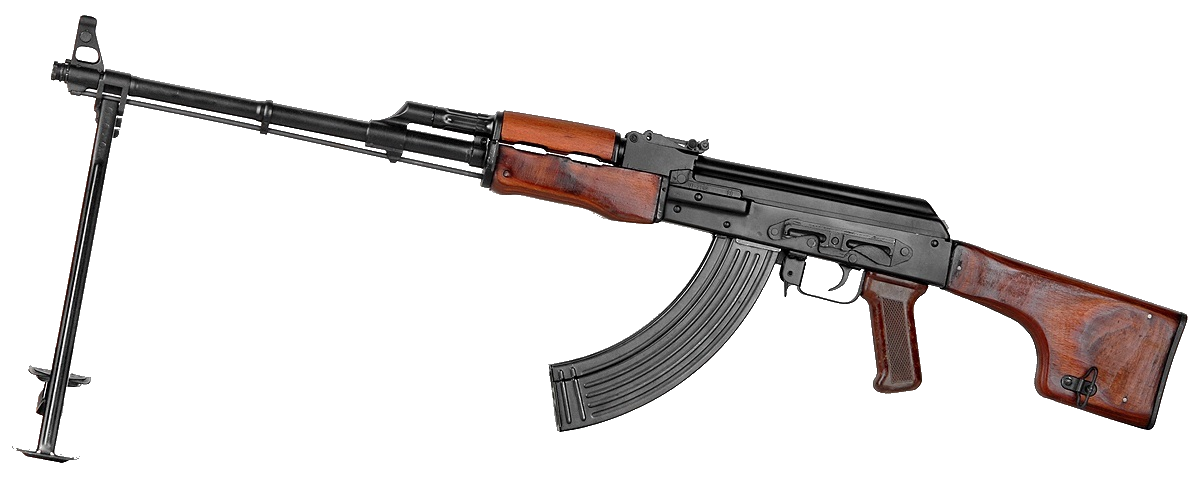

- PKM

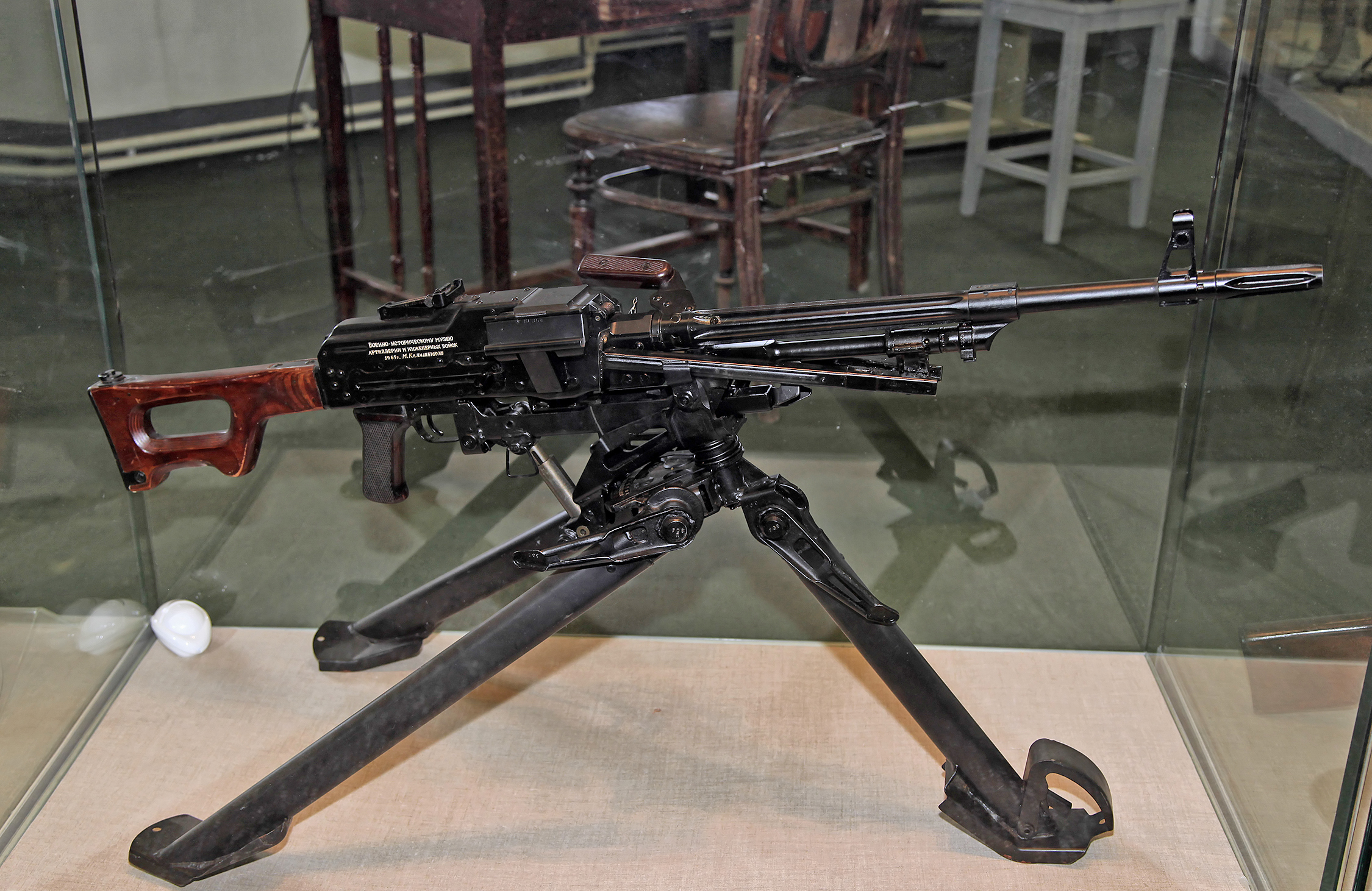

- M60 Machine Gun

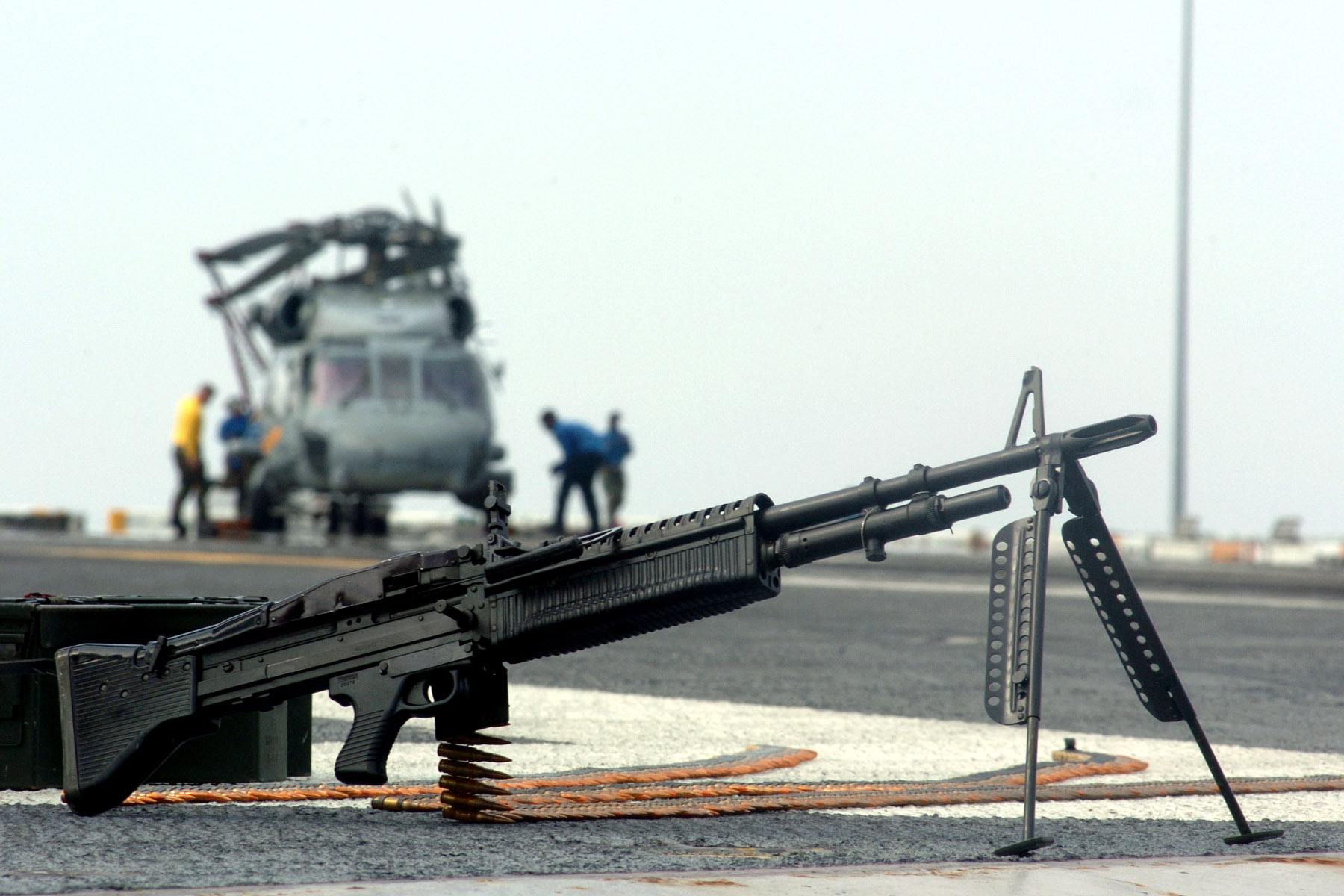

- Ultimax 100

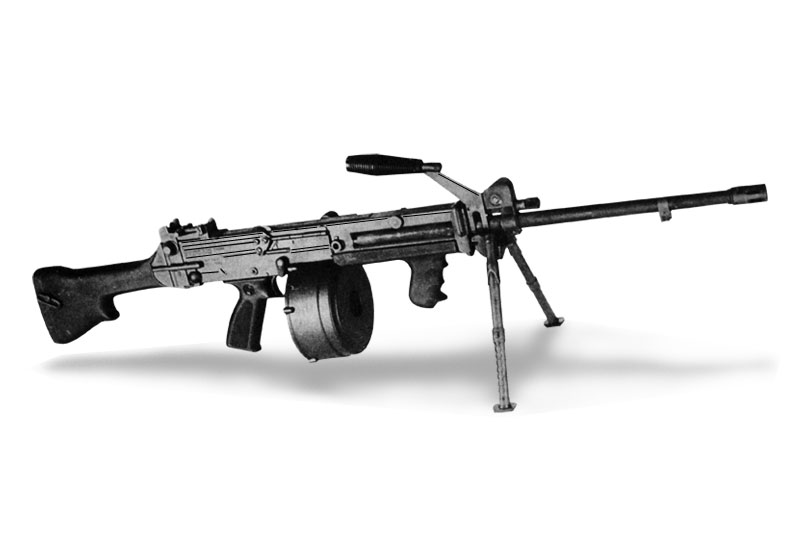

- M2 Browning

=== Grenade Rocket Launchers ===
- RPG-7

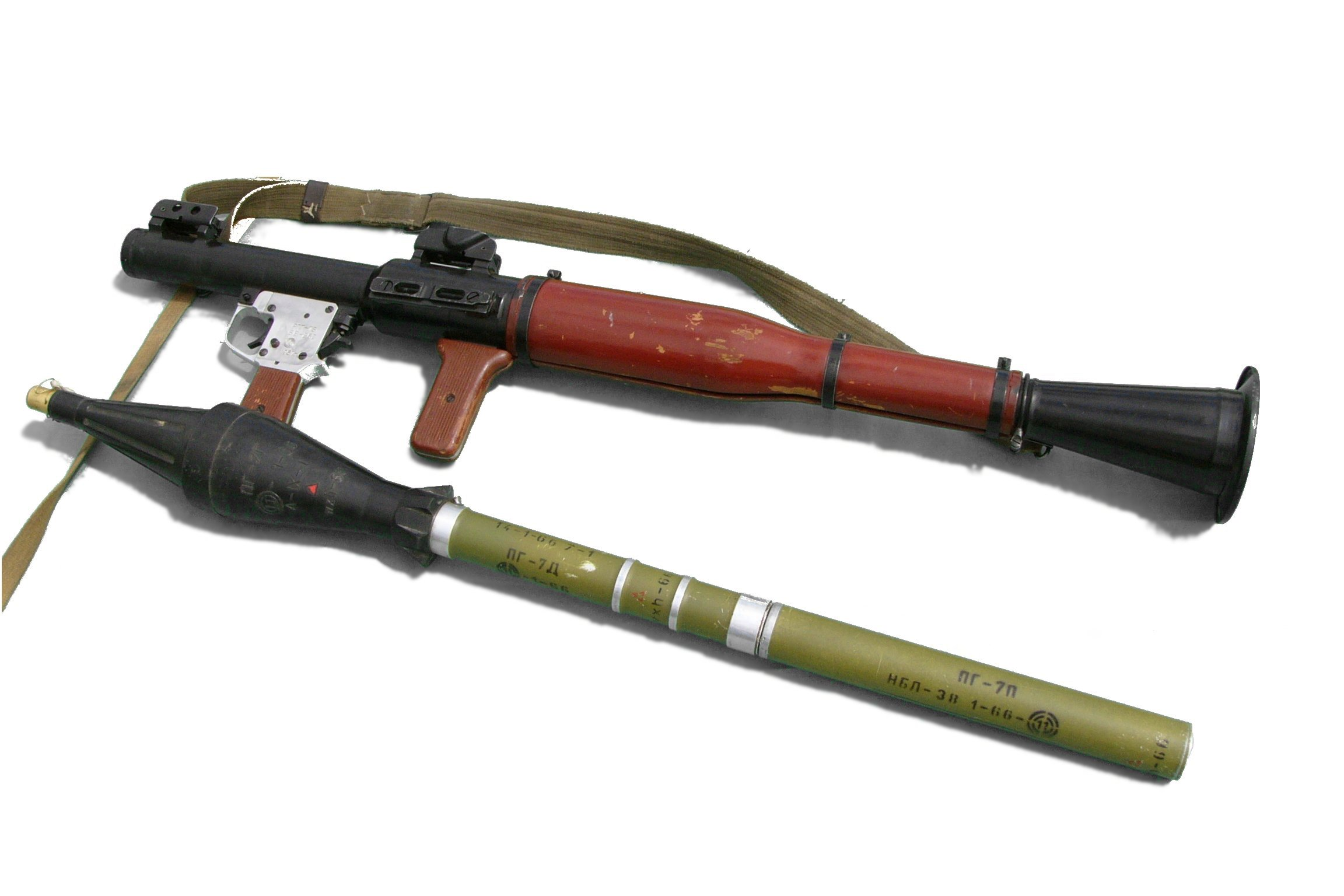

- RPO-A

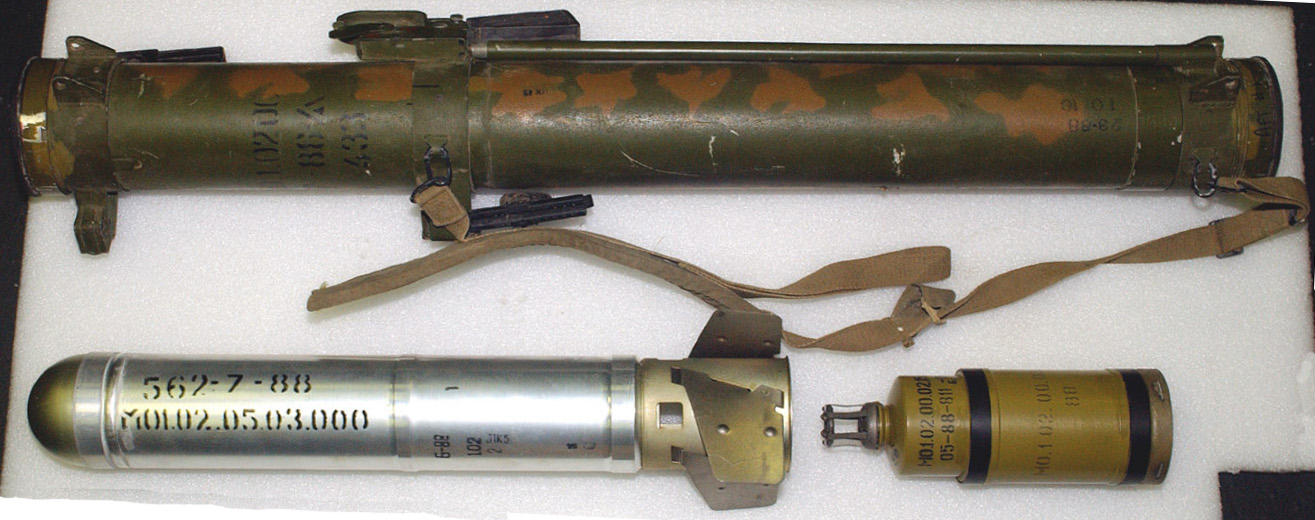

- M79 Grenade Launcher

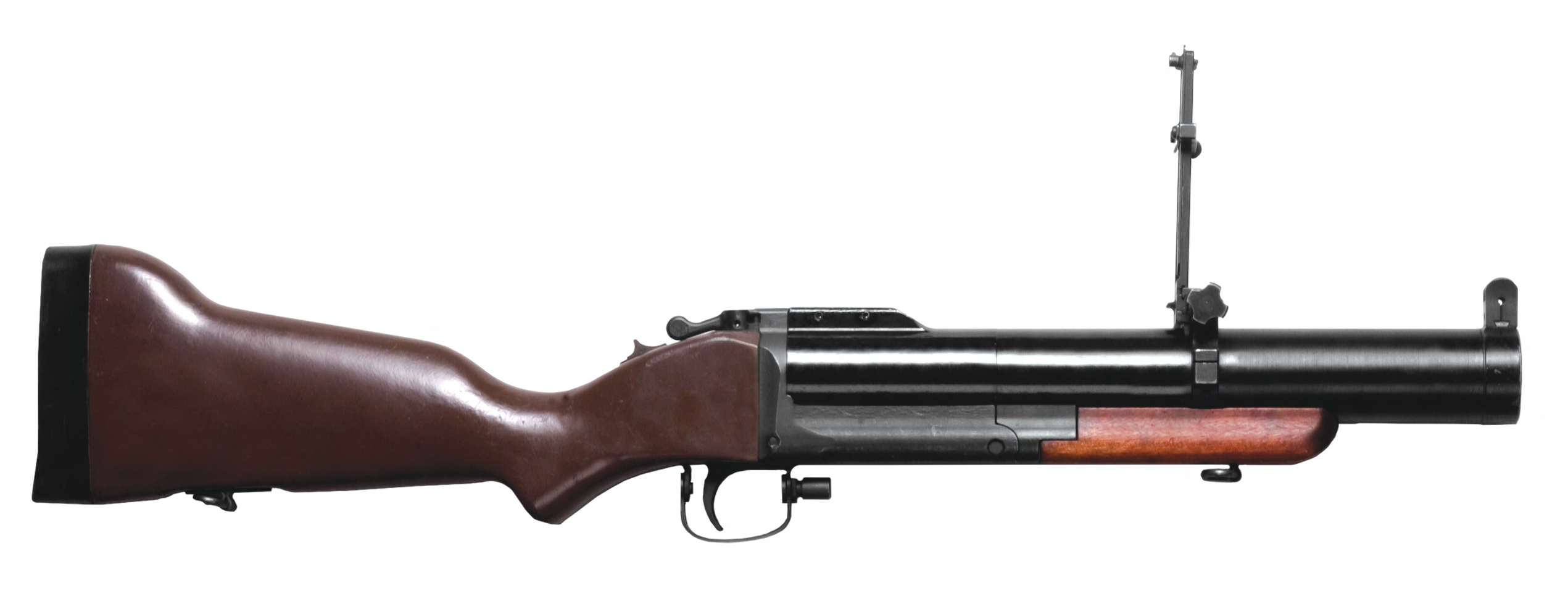

=== Heavy Artillery ===
- 6 x 105 mm KH178 howitzer

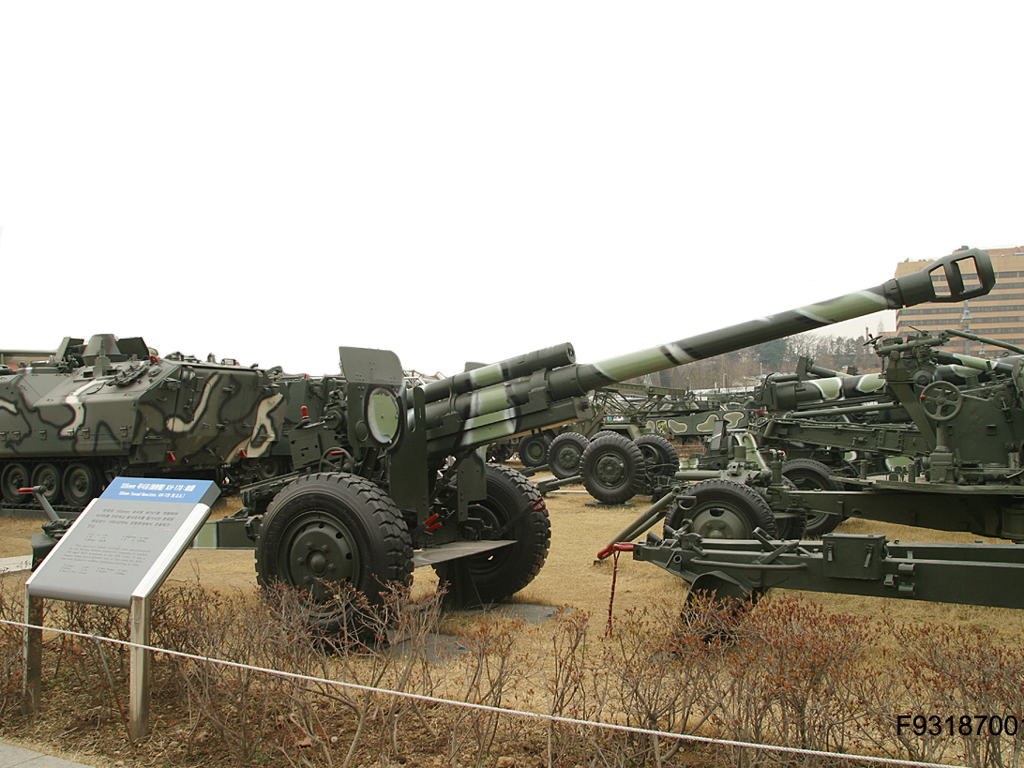

- 12 x mortar F2 (L16) 81 mm

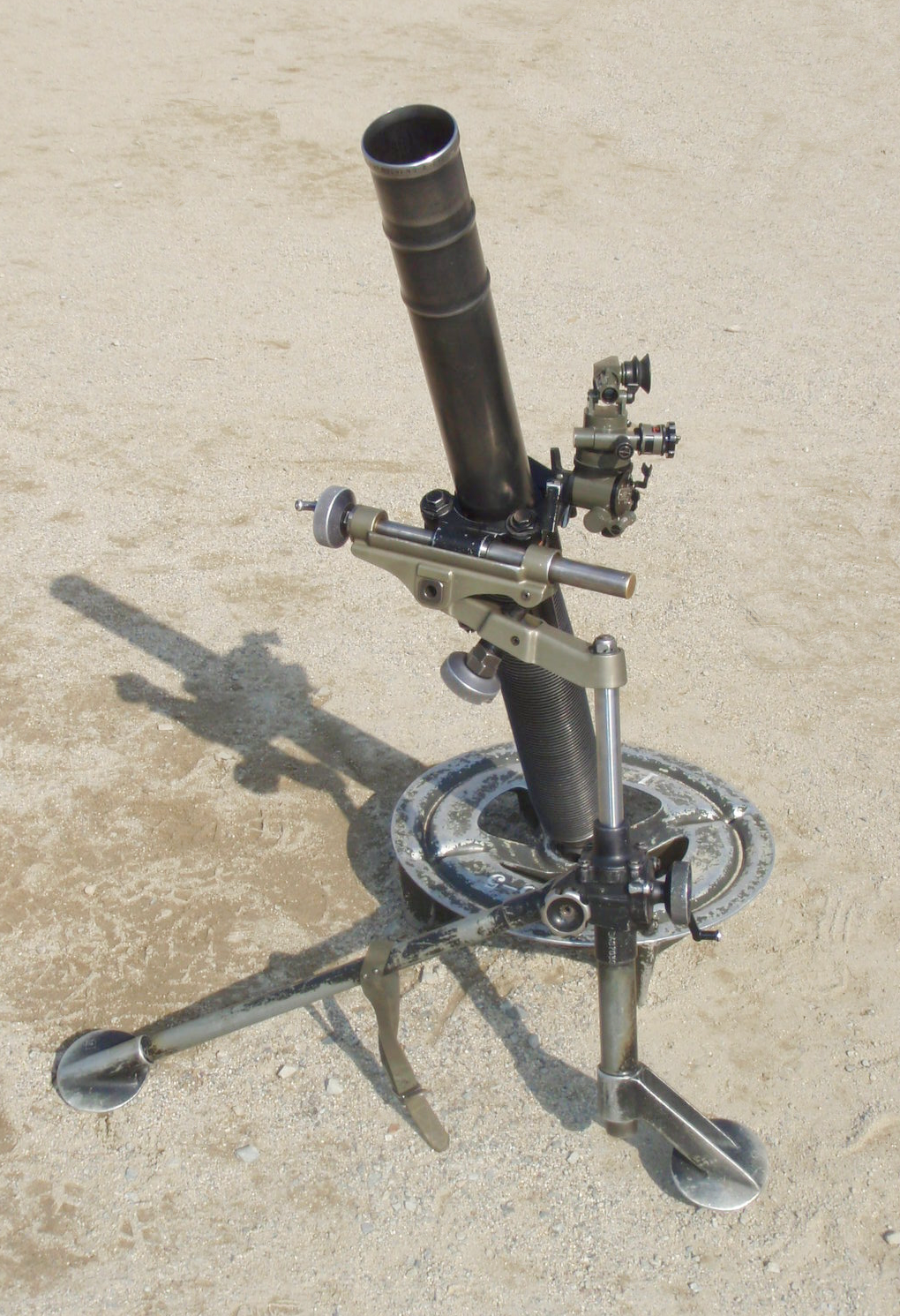

- Shaanxi SX2190- *8-ton class

6x6 special heavy duty truck

- Ural-4320 – * Mobile Mechanical Workshop –
- 24 x refurbished Bushmaster Protected Mobility Vehicle
- BJ2022- *3/4 ton 4×4 utility vehicle
- Patria Pasi-*six-wheeled armoured personnel carrier
- Iveco VM 90-* Multirole Military Vehicle

== Fiji Infantry Regiment ==
The Fiji Infantry Regiment is the main combat element of the Republic of Fiji Military Forces. The regiment was formed with the foundation of the Fijian armed forces in 1920. The regiment, as it is today, goes back to 1978 following Fiji's independence.

== Fijian Navy ==
Fijian naval ensign

The Republic of Fiji Navy was formed in 1975, following the government's ratification of the United Nations Law of the Sea convention. The Navy is responsible for maritime needs in border control, such as watching over Fiji's exclusive economic zone and organising task and rescue missions. It currently operates 9 patrol boats. Military aid is received from Australia, the People's Republic of China, and the United Kingdom (although the latter has suspended aid as a result of the 2006 military coup against the civilian government).

Speaking at 30th anniversary celebrations on 26 July 2006, Commander Bradley Bower said that the greatest challenge facing the navy of a maritime country like Fiji was to maintain sovereignty and the maritime environment, to acquire, restore, and replace equipment, and to train officers to keep pace with changing situations.

In January 2019 five of Fiji's naval vessels were operational. In 2020, Australia provided two new Guardian-class patrol vessels to replace the three vessels it provided over thirty years ago. In December 2019, Fiji took delivery of RFNS Volasiga, boosting the number of operational vessels to six. The Guardian-class patrol boat RFNS Savenaca was officially handed over to Fijian officials, in Henderson, Australia, on 6 March 2020.

Northern Air operates search and rescue flights for the Navy.

=== Equipment ===
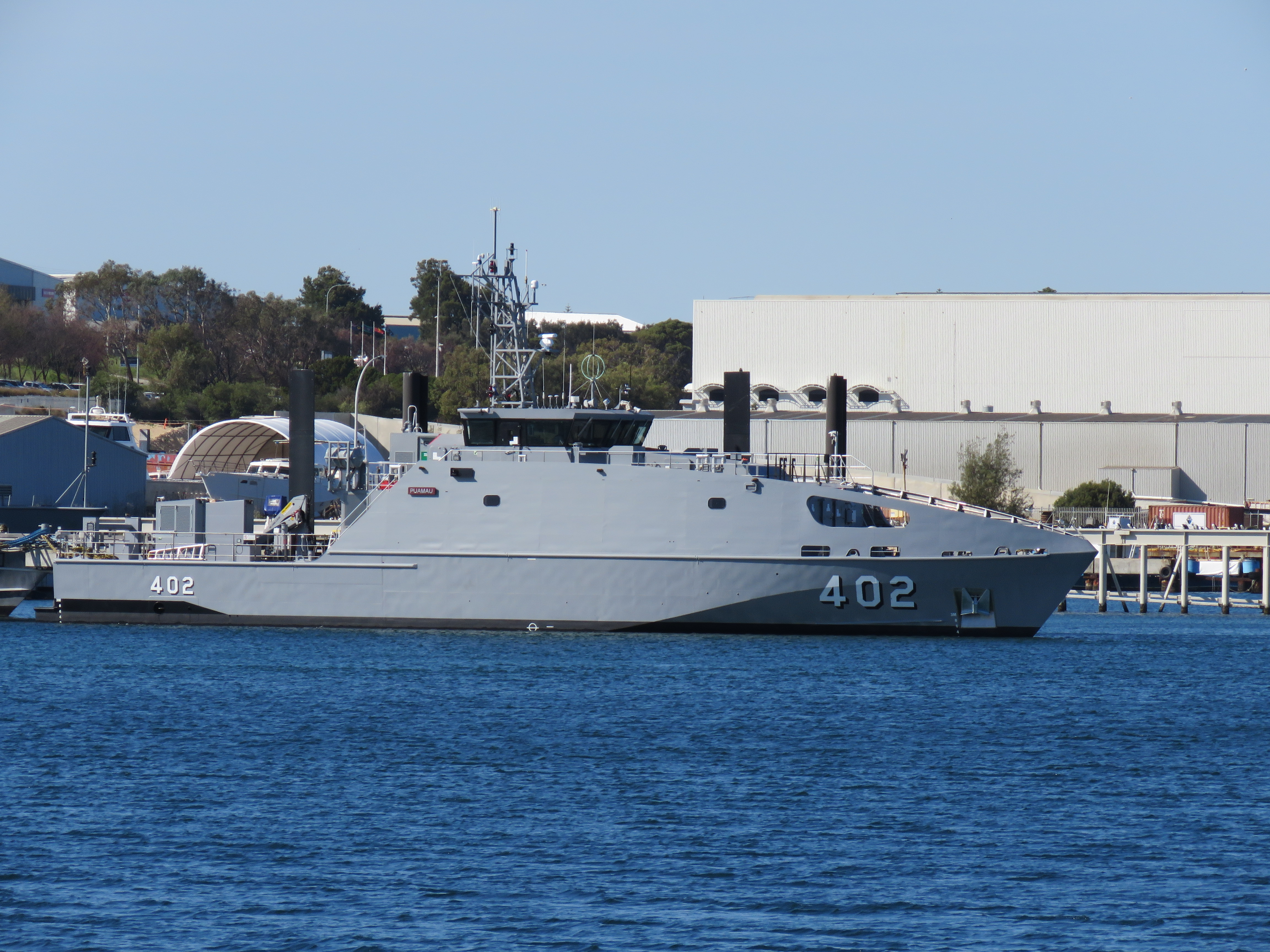
Fijian Navy Guardian-class patrol boat RFNS Puamau

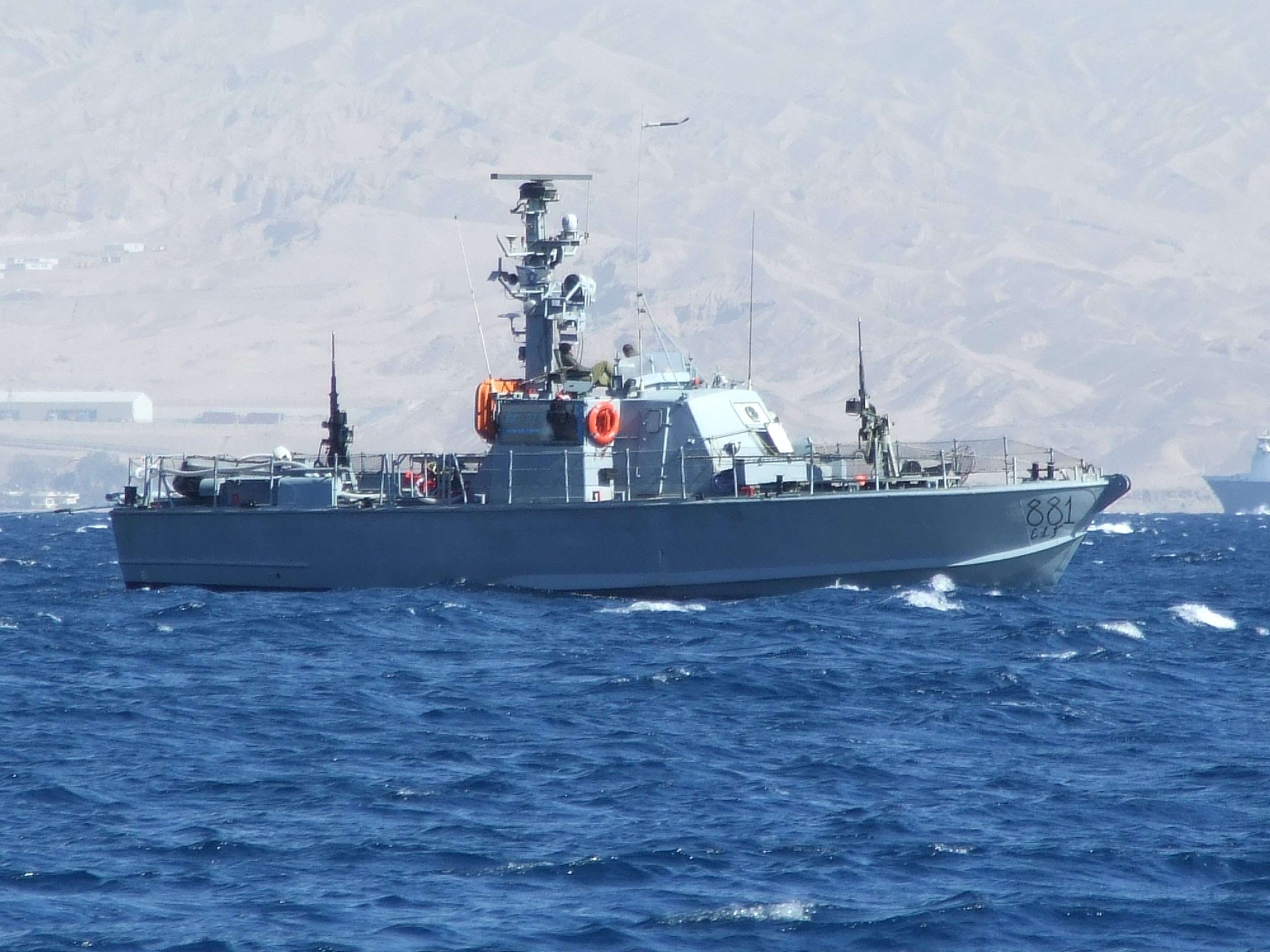
Dabur-class patrol boat (Israeli boat No. 881)

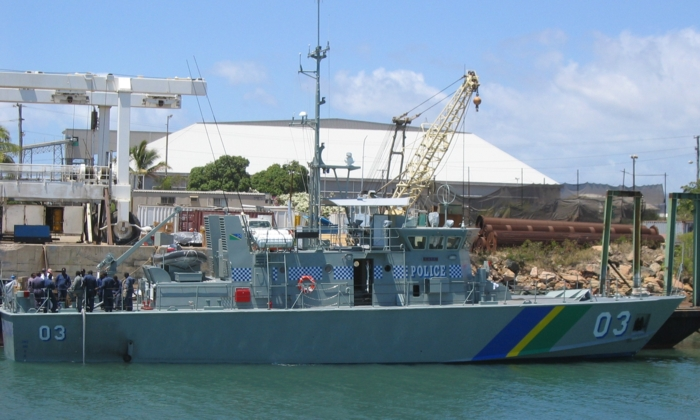
Pacific-class patrol boat (Solomon Island police boat RSIPV Lata)

3 x Pacific-class patrol boat (Australia, displacement 162 t, length 31.5 metres (103 ft 4 in), width 8.1 metres (26 ft 7 in) draught 1.8 metres (5 ft 11 in), power 2 x 1,050 kilowatts (1,410 shp), maximal speed 20 knots (37 km/h), crew 17-man, armament machine guns 1 x 12.7 mm). These boats replaced discharged Redwing-class minesweepers FNS Kula, Kikau and Kiro, gained 1975 – 1976 from the United States Navy.

- RFNS Kula (201) (May 1994)
- RFNS Kikau (202) (May 1995)
- RFNS Kiro (203) (October 1995)

2 x Guardian-class patrol boats (Australia, speed 20 knots, crew 23)

- RFNS Savenaca (401) (2020)
- RFNS Puamau (402) (2024)

2 patrol boat (US, displacement 97 t, crew 11-man, armament machine guns 1 x 12.7 mm)

- RFNS Levouka (101) (1987)
- RFNS Lautoka (102) (1987)

4 Dabur-class patrol boat (Israel, displacement 39 t, crew 9-man, armament 2 x cannon 20 mm, 2 x machine guns 7.62 mm)

- RFNS Vai (301) (1991)
- RFNS Ogo (302) (1991)
- RFNS Saku (303) (1991)
- RFNS Saqa (304) (1991)

2 Oceanic survey vessels

- RFNS Volasiga
- RFNS Kacau

== Rank insignia ==
Rank designation is based on the British tradition.

=== Commissioned officers ===
The rank insignia for commissioned officers for the army and navy respectively. They are based on the rank structure of the Royal Navy and British Army.

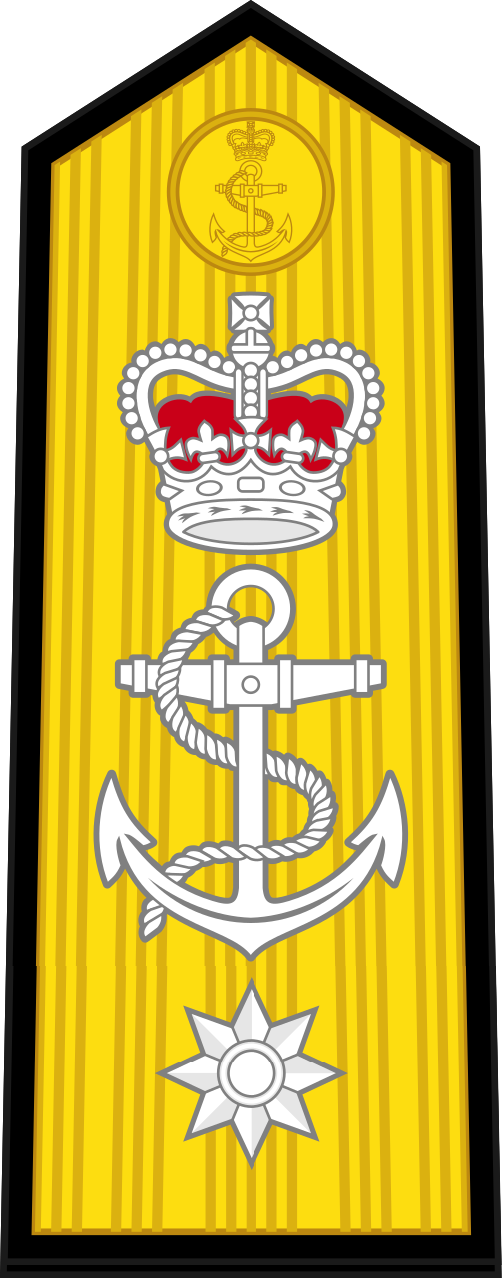
| Rank group | General / flag officers | | Senior officers | | | Junior officers |
|---|---|---|---|---|---|---|---|---|
| Fiji Infantry Regiment |
| Fiji Infantry Regiment | Major general | Brigadier | Colonel | Lieutenant colonel | Major | Captain | Lieutenant | Second lieutenant |
| Fiji Infantry Regiment | Jenerali meja | Brigadi | Kanala | Leteni kanala | Meja | Kavetani | Leteni | Ikarua ni leteni |
| Republic of Fiji Navy |
| Republic of Fiji Navy | Rear admiral | Commodore | Captain | Commander | Lieutenant commander | Lieutenant | Sub-Lieutenant | Ensign |
| Rank group | General / flag officers | | Senior officers | | | Junior officers |

=== Enlisted ===
The rank insignia for enlisted personnel for the army and navy respectively. They are based on the ranks of the Royal Navy and British Army.

| Rank group | Senior NCOs | | | | Junior NCOs | | Enlisted |
|---|---|---|---|---|---|---|---|
| Fiji Infantry Regiment | | | | | | | No insignia |
| Fiji Infantry Regiment | Warrant officer class 1 | Warrant officer class 2 | Staff sergeant | Sergeant | Corporal | Lance corporal | Private (or equivalent) |
| Republic of Fiji Navy | | | | | | | No insignia |
| Republic of Fiji Navy | Warrant officer class 1 | Warrant officer class 2 | Chief petty officer | Petty officer | Leading seaman | | Ordinary seaman |
| Rank group | Senior NCOs | | | | Junior NCOs | | Enlisted |

== History ==
=== Political intervention ===
Fiji's military has a history of political intervention. In 1987, soldiers were responsible for two military coups, and in 2000, the military organised a countercoup to quash George Speight's civilian coup. Since 2000, the military has had a sometimes tense relationship with the Qarase government, and has strongly opposed its plans to establish a Commission with the power to compensate victims and pardon perpetrators of the coup. Among other objections, the military claims that its integrity and discipline would be undermined if soldiers who mutinied in the 2000 upheaval were to be pardoned.

On 4 August 2005, Opposition Leader Mahendra Chaudhry called for more Indo-Fijians, who presently comprise less than one percent of the military personnel, to be recruited. (Specifically, as of October 2007, Fiji's military had 3527 full-time members, of whom only 15 were Indo-Fijians.) This would help guarantee political stability, he considered. He also spoke against government plans to downsize the military. Military spokesman Lieutenant Colonel Orisi Rabukawaqa responded the next day by saying that the military was not an ethnic Fijian body, that it stood to serve the entire nation, and that there was no colour bar in its recruitment or promotion. He said that many Indo-Fijians had been reluctant to commit themselves to a military career because of the slow progress of promotion, often preferring to be discharged and to use their record as a stepping stone to a successful career in some other field. Nevertheless, he appreciated the Indo-Fijian contribution to the military, and noted the success of Lieutenant Colonel Mohammed Aziz, the head of the military's legal unit who was a pivotal figure in the court martial of soldiers who mutinied in 2000. Ironically the rate of promotion of indigenous Fijian officers had been very rapid after the 1987 coup, and subsequent expansion of the Republic of Fiji Military Forces.

On 26 August 2005, the government announced plans to study ways to reduce the size of the military. Military engineers would be transferred to the Regional Development Ministry, said Home Affairs Minister Josefa Vosanibola, and the reduction of the military forces would coincide with an increase in the numbers of the police force.

On 26 September 2005, Rabukawaqa revealed that the military had decided to curtail certain operations to stay within its budget. The cuts would affect maritime patrols, search and rescue operations, training and exercises, School Cadet training, and the deployment of military engineers to rural areas. These cuts would be made to ensure that activities accorded a higher priority, such as peacekeeping operations in the Sinai Peninsula and Iraq, officer cadet training with the New Zealand Defence Forces, and the prosecution of soldiers charged with mutiny, would not be affected, Rabukawaqa said.

The next day, Lesi Korovavala, chief executive officer of the Ministry of Home Affairs, told the Fiji Village news service that the military had undertaken the reductions on its own initiative, in consultation with the department, an explanation corroborated by Lieutenant Colonel Rabukawaqa.

On 5 December 2006, the Fijian army staged a third coup d'état. On 7 February 2008, the head of the RFMF and post-coup interim Prime Minister Voreqe Bainimarama stated: "Qarase [...] does not understand the role of the Military and as such is misinforming the nation. [...] [I]f there are practices and policies which have potential to undermine the national security and territorial integrity of Fiji, the RFMF has every right under the Constitution to intervene." In August 2009, with Bainimarama still controlling the government as prime minister and the constitution abrogated, Epeli Nailatikau, a former military commander, was appointed acting president on the retirement of Iloilo.

=== Operations ===
Fiji committed troops to the United Nations Assistance Mission for Iraq. Australia agreed to transport those troops.

Fiji sent 54 individuals to Australia, to help fight wildfires there.

=== Fiji Air Wing ===
The Air Wing of the Republic of Fiji Military Forces, founded in 1987, had a base at the airport in Nausori, but was abolished in 1997. Yehonatan Shimʻon Frenḳel writes that the "Air Wing was formed after the 1987 coup, when the French provided two helicopters as part of its military aid package." Frenkel goes on to say that the air wing was disbanded after both helicopters crashed and after subsequent revelations of huge debts incurred as a result of the aircraft.

==== Aircraft ====
The two helicopters were:

| Aircraft type | Variants | Origin | Role | Service period | Notes |
|---|---|---|---|---|---|
| Eurocopter AS 365N2 Dauphin 2 | AS 365N2 Dauphin | France | Transport and liaison helicopter | 1989–1994 | One helicopter. Matriculation marker DQ-FGD. |
| Aerospatiale AS 355F-2 Twin Squirrel | AS 355F-2 Twin Squirrel | France | Transport and liaison helicopter | 1991–1997 | One helicopter. Matriculation marker DQ-FGH. |

Helicopter AS-365 N2 Dauphin crashed off the coast of the main island in July 1994; a smaller AS-355F-2 continued in service until mid-1997 and in 1999 was sold to France.

The Air Wing did not have its own roundel or ensign and its only marking was the national flag used as a fin flash.

== Facilities ==
- Queen Elizabeth Barracks, Suva
- Walu Bay Naval Base – Located at Narain Jetty in Suva Bay and to be relocated outside of Suva

== See also ==
- Military–church relations in Fiji
