= Republic of Fiji Navy =

- Wasawasa Ni Viti (Fijian)
- Logo of The Republic of Fiji Navy
- Active: July 25 1975 - Present
- Country: Republic of Fiji
- Type: Navy
- Role: Maritime Security; Exclusive Economy Zone (EEZ) patrol Search and Rescue; Fisheries Protection; Border Security; Support to Civil Authorities
- Size: 300 Active personnel; 4 Commissioned ships
- Part of: Republic of Fiji Military Forces
- Head Quarter's: Stanley Brown Naval Base, Walu Bay, Suva
- Mottos: "Rerevaka Na Kalou ka Doka Na Tui" "Fear God and Honour the King/Chief"
- Colours: Navy Blue; White
- Vessels: 4 : 2 Guardian Class; 2 Hydrographic vessel

Commanders
- Commander-in-Chief: Ratu Naiqama Lalabalavu
- Minister for Defence and National Security: Pio Tikoduadua
- Commander of the Republic of Fiji Military Forces: Brigadier General Jone Kalouniwai
- Chief of Navy: Timoci Natuva

Insignia
- Naval ensign

- Ceremonial Colour

The Republic of Fiji Navy or Fijian Navy is the naval branch of the Republic of Fiji Military Forces. Formerly known as the Royal Fijian Navy, it was established after Fiji ratified the recently created 1982 United Nations Convention on the Law of the Sea. The Convention established that maritime nations had an Exclusive Economic Zone of 200 kilometres, which extended Fiji's waters twentyfold, from 50,000 square miles (130,000 km^{2}) to over 1,000,000 square miles (2,600,000 km^{2}), necessitating a more substantial naval force to enforce Fijian jurisdiction and protect economic activity in the Fijian EEZ.

Fiji was provided three Pacific Forum patrol vessels, designed and built by Australia, so its Pacific Forum neighbours could police their own sovereignty.

Captain Humphrey Tawake is the current Chief officer of the Fijian Navy.

== Fleet ==
- RFNS Volasiga, oceanic survey vessel donated by South Korea, in use since 2019
- RFNS Kacau, hydrographic survey vessel donated by China, in use since 2019, Fiji's largest vessel, with a crew complement of about 30
- RFNS Savenaca (401), the first of two Guardian-class patrol vessels, to be built in Australia
- RFNS Timo (403) commissioned in early 2025 to replace RFNS Puamau

=== Decommissioned vessels ===
- RFNS Puamau (402), the second Guardian-class patrol vessel, commissioned in 2024. It ran aground in June 2024 and was later decommissioned.
- RFNS Kikau (202), Pacific Forum patrol vessel, decommissioned in 2023
- RFNS Kula (201), Pacific Forum patrol vessel, Decommissioned in 2020
- RFNS Kiro (203), Pacific Forum patrol vessel, Decommissioned in 2016
- RFNS Vai (301), Dabur-class patrol boat
- RFNS Ogo (302), Dabur-class patrol boat
- RFNS Saku (303), Dabur-class patrol boat
- RFNS Saqa (304), Dabur-class patrol boat
- RFNS Levouka (101)
- RFNS Lautoka (102)
