= Viliame Naupoto =

Fijian politician

The Honourable Viliame Naupoto MP, CF (MIL)
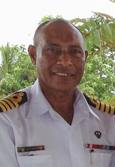
- Naupoto in 2015

Member of Parliament
- Incumbent
- Assumed office December 14, 2022
- Prime Minister: Sitiveni Rabuka
Political Positions
Minister for Immigration
Incumbent
Assumed office January 10th, 2025
Prime Minister	Sitiveni Rabuka
Preceded by	Pio Tikoduadua
Chairman of the Standing Committee on Foreign affairs and defense
In office March 2, 2023 – 2025
Prime Minister	Sitiveni Rabuka
Preceded by	Alexander O'Connor
Succeeded by	Lenora Qereqeretabua
Minister for Youth and Sports
In office February 22, 2012 – September 24, 2014
Prime Minister	Sitiveni Rabuka
Preceded by	Position Est.
Succeeded by	Laisenia Tuitubou
Further Office's held
Acting Permanent Secretary Prime Minister's Office
In office late 2009 – 2010
Prime Minister	Frank Bainimarama
Preceded by	Parmesh Chand
Succeeded by	?????
Permanent Secretary Ministry of Fisheries and Forests
In office 2009–2012
Minister	Joketani Cokanasiga
Preceded by	?????
Succeeded by	?????
Chairman of Fiji Trade and Investment Group
In office 2009–2011
Chairman of Fiji Pine Group
In office 2007–2014

Personal details
- Born: April 5, 1962 (age 64)
- Spouse: Lillian Naupoto
- Children: 5

Military service
- Allegiance: Fiji
- Branch/service: Republic of Fiji Navy
- Years of service: 1982-2007; 2015-2021
- Rank: Rear admiral
- Commands: Commander of the Republic of Fiji Military Forces; Chief of Staff RFMF; RFNS Kula

Rear Admiral (Ret.) Viliame Naupoto OF (MIL) is a Fijian politician and former Fijian soldier. He is the current Minister for Immigration. He was a former Cabinet Minister under the FijiFirst government. After serving as Commander of the Republic of Fiji Navy, he was appointed as a Minister in the military regime of dictator Frank Bainimarama. He was later appointed commander of the Republic of Fiji Military Forces, before being elected to the Parliament of Fiji in December 2022.

== Military Career ==
He joined the Republic of Fiji Military Forces in 1982 and served in the Fiji Navy. In 1994 he was the Captain of the newly commissioned RFNS Kula. During his time in the military, he served as the Commander of Fiji Navy, Director Finance and Logistics and Commander. While serving as Navy Commander, Naupoto was arrested drink-driving. His case file subsequently went missing from the Nabua police station, but was eventually found, and he was convicted and fined US$100.

Following the 2006 Fijian coup d'état Naupoto was appointed Director of Immigration by the military, and was responsible for placing travel bans on the regime's opponents. He also deported legal representatives of regime opponents. After being sent to India for training, he was appointed Permanent Secretary in the Prime Minister's Office, and then chair of the Fiji Trade and Investment Board and Permanent Secretary of the Department of Fisheries and Forests. In February 2012 he was appointed Minister of Youth and Sports in the military cabinet.

Naputo was selected as a FijiFirst candidate for the 2014 Fijian general election, but not elected. Following the election he returned to the military, serving as chief of staff. Following the sudden resignation of RFMF Commander Mosese Tikoitoga in August 2015 he was appointed acting commander. The appointment was made permanent in March 2016. In November 2015 he was promoted to Rear Admiral. When Jioji Konrote was elected President of Fiji in October 2015, Naupoto became eligible for a seat in Parliament as his replacement, but turned it down to stay in the military. He retired from the RFMF in March 2021, and was replaced as RFMF Commander by Jone Kalouniwai in September 2021.

== MP Career ==
He was selected again as a FijiFirst candidate for the 2022 election, and was elected with 830 votes. Following the election he was appointed as Chair of the Foreign Affairs and Defense Committee.

Following the collapse and deregistration of FijiFirst he remained in parliament as an independent, but said that he would support the government of Sitiveni Rabuka. He was subsequently appointed chief whip of the opposition Group of 9 Bloc. On 10 January 2025, he was sworn as Minister of Immigration under Rabuka's government.

== Electoral History ==
2014 General Election
Votes	Percentage out of Election	Percentage out of Party votes	Placement		Party
679	0.135%	0.231%	36/44 Party	94/248 Election	FijiFirst
Source: FijiElectionsOffice

2022 General Election
Votes	Percentage out of Election	Percentage out of Party votes	Placement		Party
830	0.140%	0.415%	22/55 Party	85/343 Election	FijiFirst
Source: FijiElectionsOffice

== Awards ==
In November 2014 Naupoto was made an Officer of the Order of Fiji.

Military offices
Preceded by Mosese Tikoitoga	Commander of the Fijian Military Forces; Acting Commander until December 2015; 2015-2021	Succeeded by Jone Kalouniwai
