= Mosese Tikoitoga =

Fijian soldier and diplomat (died 2023)

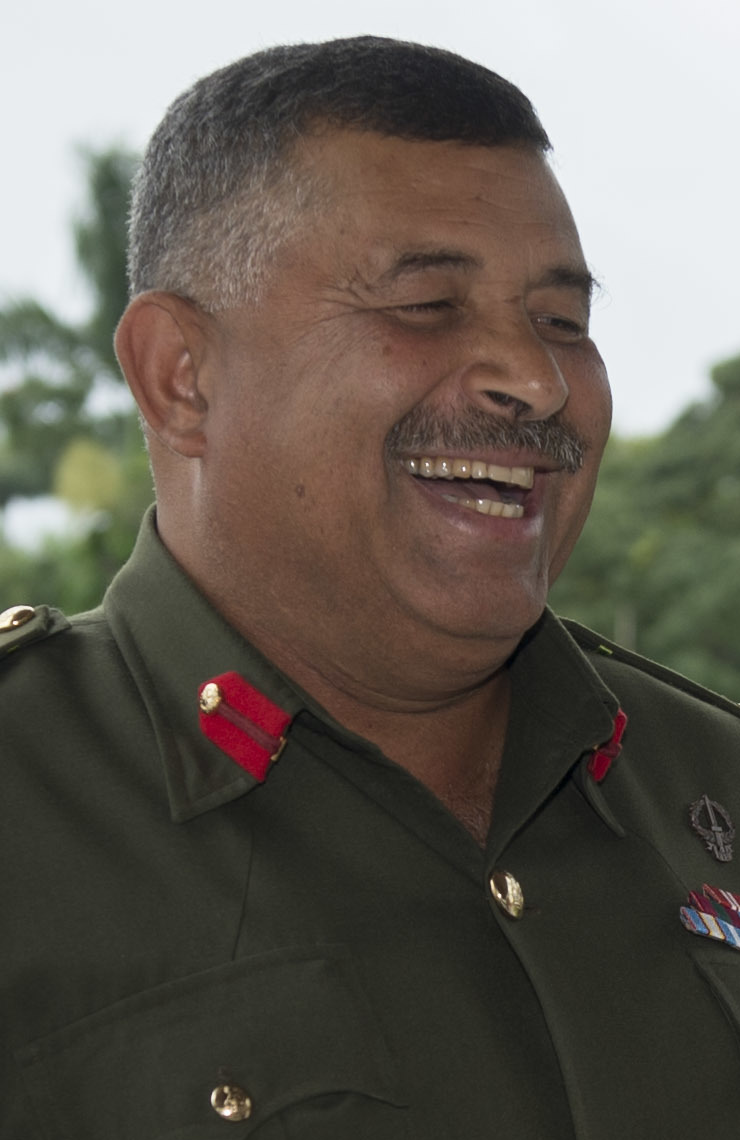

High commissioner to Papua New Guinea
- In office August 1, 2023 – December 29, 2023 (Died in Office)
- President: Wiliame Katonivere
- Prime Minister: Sitiveni Rabuka
- Preceded by: None (Mission Closed)
- Succeeded by: Jackson Bernard Nato Evans

Commander of the Republic of Fiji Military Forces
- In office March 5, 2014 – August 1, 2015
- President: Ratu Epeli Nailatikau
- Prime Minister: Frank Bainimarama
- Preceded by: Rear Admiral Frank Bainimarama
- Succeeded by: Rear Admiral Viliame Naupoto

Personal details
- Born: September 20, 1961 Colonial War Memorial Hospital, Suva, Fiji
- Died: December 29, 2023 (aged 62) Port Moresby, Papua New Guinea
- Spouse: Jiutajia Saukuru Tikoitoga
- Education: University of Canberra (MM) * University of Madras (MPhil)

Military service
- Allegiance: Republic of Fiji
- Branch/service: Fiji Infantry Regiment
- Years of service: 32 years
- Rank: Brigadier-General

Brigadier Mosese Tikoitoga (died 29 December 2023) was a Fijian soldier and diplomat, who served as Commander of the Republic of Fiji Military Forces from 2014 to 2015.

Tikoitoga was educated at the University of Canberra, gaining a Masters in Management in Defence Studies, and at the University of Madras, where he gained a Masters of Philosophy in Defence and Strategic Studies.

Following the 2006 Fijian coup d'état he was appointed RFMF chief of staff in July 2007. He acted as the spokesperson for the military regime. He was appointed Land Forces Commander in October 2010, replacing Pita Driti who was sent on leave for plotting against the regime. In May 2011 he was elected chair of the Fiji Rugby Union.

In 2012 the military regime appointed a constitutional commission to draft a new constitution as part of a return to democracy. in December 2012 Tikoitoga ordered all copies of the draft seized and demanded the prosecution of commission chair Yash Ghai. The draft was subsequently discarded and a new, military-drafted constitution imposed.

Tikoitoga was appointed RFMF commander in March 2014 in order to enable dictator Frank Bainimarama to form a political party and contest the 2014 Fijian general election. He was replaced as Land Force Commander by Lieutenant Colonel Jone Kalouniwai. During the election campaign he announced the military would be monitoring political party meetings, but that the military would accept the election outcome. He resigned abruptly in August 2015 and was replaced by Viliame Naupoto.

In January 2016 he was appointed ambassador to Ethiopia and later the Representative to the African Union. In May 2023 he was appointed acting ambassador-at-large. In September 2023 he was appointed high commissioner to Papua New Guinea, a post he previously served in till 2020 when the office closed down due to the Covid-29 Pandemic. He died in Port Moresby on 29 December 2023 after a brief illness.

In November 2014 Tikoitoga was made an Officer of the Order of Fiji. He died on 29 December 2023.

Military offices
Preceded by Frank Bainimarama	Commander of the Fijian Military Forces; 2014–2015	Succeeded by Viliame Naupoto
