= Ranks of the Republic of Fiji Military Forces =

The Military ranks of Fiji are the military insignia used by the Republic of Fiji Military Forces. Being a former Crown colony, Fiji shares a rank structure similar to that of the United Kingdom.

== Commissioned officer ranks ==
The rank insignia of commissioned officers.

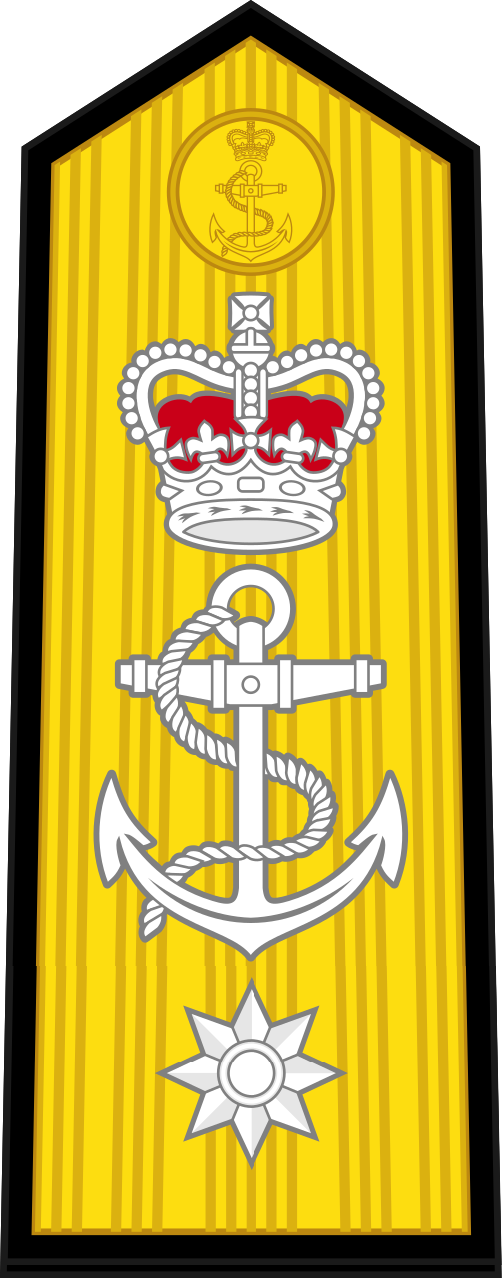
Rank group	General / flag officers		Senior officers			Junior officers
Fiji Infantry Regiment
Fiji Infantry Regiment	Major general	Brigadier	Colonel	Lieutenant colonel	Major	Captain	Lieutenant	Second lieutenant
Fiji Infantry Regiment	Jenerali meja	Brigadi	Kanala	Leteni kanala	Meja	Kavetani	Leteni	Ikarua ni leteni
Republic of Fiji Navy
Republic of Fiji Navy	Rear admiral	Commodore	Captain	Commander	Lieutenant commander	Lieutenant	Sub-Lieutenant	Ensign
Rank group	General / flag officers		Senior officers			Junior officers

== Other ranks ==
The rank insignia of non-commissioned officers and enlisted personnel.

Rank group	Senior NCOs				Junior NCOs		Enlisted
Fiji Infantry Regiment							No insignia
Fiji Infantry Regiment	Warrant officer class 1	Warrant officer class 2	Staff sergeant	Sergeant	Corporal	Lance corporal	Private (or equivalent)
Republic of Fiji Navy							No insignia
Republic of Fiji Navy	Warrant officer class 1	Warrant officer class 2	Chief petty officer	Petty officer	Leading seaman		Ordinary seaman
Rank group	Senior NCOs				Junior NCOs		Enlisted
