= RFNS Puamau =

Patrol boat built in 2023

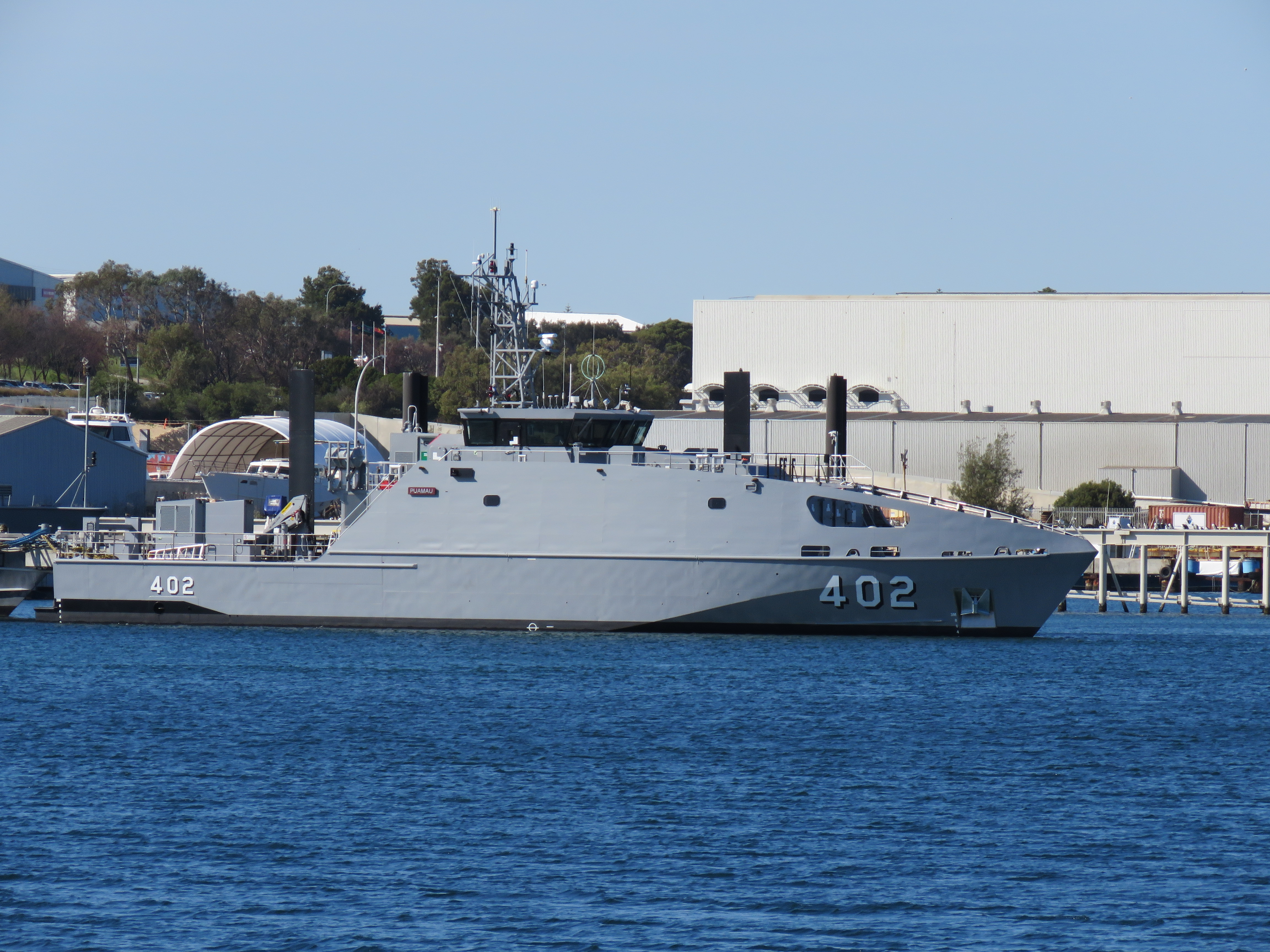
- RFNS Puamau at the Austal shipyards in Henderson, Western Australia.

History

Fiji
- Name: Puamau
- Builder: Austal
- Acquired: March 2024
- Commissioned: 7 March 2024
- Identification: IMO number: 4734283; MMSI number: 520348000; Callsign: 3DPW
- Status: Inactive

General characteristics
- Class & type: Guardian-class patrol boat
- Length: 39.5 m (129 ft 7 in)
- Beam: 8 m (26 ft 3 in)
- Draft: 2.5 m (8 ft 2 in)
- Propulsion: 2 × Caterpillar 3516C diesel engines, 2 shafts
- Speed: 20 knots (37 km/h; 23 mph)
- Range: 3,000 nmi (5,600 km; 3,500 mi) at 12 knots (22 km/h; 14 mph)
- Armament: Australia provides the ships without armament, but they are designed to be able to mount heavy machine guns, or an autocannon of up to 30 mm on the foredeck

RFNS Puamau (402) is a Guardian-class patrol boat donated to Fiji (for the Fijian Navy) by Australia as part of the Pacific Patrol Boat Replacement Project. The vessel entered service on 7 March 2024. The ship is used to patrol Fijian waters.

== Design and description ==
Puamau is a Guardian-class patrol boat, a design based on previous patrol boat types constructed by Austal for Australia. The vessel is 39.5 metres (129 ft 7 in) long overall with a beam of 8 m (26 ft 3 in) and a draft of 2.5 m (8 ft 2 in) when loaded. Puamau is powered by two Caterpillar 3516C diesel engines with two ZF7600 gearboxes turning two fixed pitch propellers creating 4,000 kW (5,400 hp). The ship has a maximum speed of 20 knots (37 km/h; 23 mph) and a range of 3,000 nautical miles (5,600 km; 3,500 mi) at 12 knots (22 km/h; 14 mph). The ship has berths for up to 23 crew and is equipped with one fast rescue rigid-inflatable boat with two 90 hp (67 kW) Yamaha engines capable of operating with up to 15 people aboard. There is a 16 m^{2} (170 sq ft) cargo deck serviced by a crane and is fitted for but not equipped with an autocannon of up to 30 mm (1.2 in) and a 0.50-calibre machine gun on both the port and starboard sides of the ship.

== Construction and career ==
Australia ordered the Guardian-class patrol boats as part of the Pacific Patrol Boat Replacement Project, an Australian government initiative to provide patrol vessels to the surrounding island nations of the Pacific. Twenty-two ships were ordered in all, and Fiji received its first vessel, RFNS Saveneca in 2020. Puamau was the nineteenth vessel constructed under the program, at Austal's shipyard in Henderson, Australia. The future crew of Puamau left Fiji on 2 January 2024 aboard RFNS Kikau for training on the new ship. Puamau was delivered to Australia on 7 March, who then gifted the vessel to the government of Fiji and the Fijian Navy with Fijian Prime Minister Sitiveni Rabuka in attendance. Puamau sailed for Fiji, arriving on 4 May.

=== Grounding ===
On 11 June 2024, Puamau grounded on a reef at Fulaga Island during its maiden voyage. No one was hurt in the grounding and Australia aided in the salvage of the ship. It is the fourth Guardian-class patrol boat to suffer serious damage, with the Samoan Nafanua II running aground in August 2021 and subsequently being found to be beyond economical repair, replaced by Nafanua III. Vanuatu's RVS Takuare and Tuvalu's HMTSS Te Mataili II were damaged when two cyclones hit Vanuatu in March 2023. While Takuare was being repaired in Cairns, Tuvalu was scheduled to receive a replacement boat for Te Mataili II.

On 11 October 2024, Fiji's Minister for Home Affairs, Pio Tikoduadua, announced that it would be decommissioned. As replacement, RFNS Timo, another Guardian-class boat, was commissioned and given over to Fiji.
