= Humphrey Tawake =

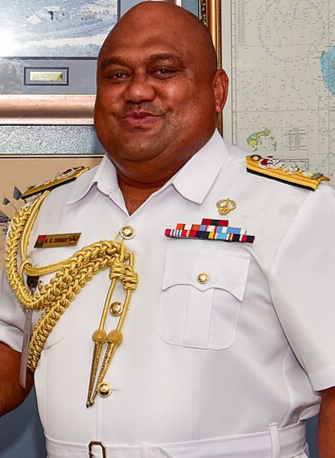
- Captain Humphrey B. Tawake in 2022
- Born: Fiji
- Occupation: Naval officer

Humphrey Tawake is a senior officer in the Republic of Fiji Naval Service.

Tawake represented Fiji at the 2017 Global Coast Guard Summit, in Tokyo.

Tawake lead the welcome back ceremony upon the return of RFNS Kikau, from an extensive refit in Australia, in October, 2018.

Tawake lead a technical delegation on a tour of Australian Navy dive support facilities, in September, 2019, in his capacity as Chief officer of the Fiji Navy.

Australia and Fiji military cooperation has included hosting senior Fiji officers at Australian Defence Force institutions, for advanced staff officer training. Tawake was scheduled to spend late 2019 and much of 2020 receiving that training.

Tawake was one of the Fijian VIPs at the acceptance ceremony for the RFNS Savenaca, on March 6, 2020.
