= RFNS Savenaca =

Patrol boat

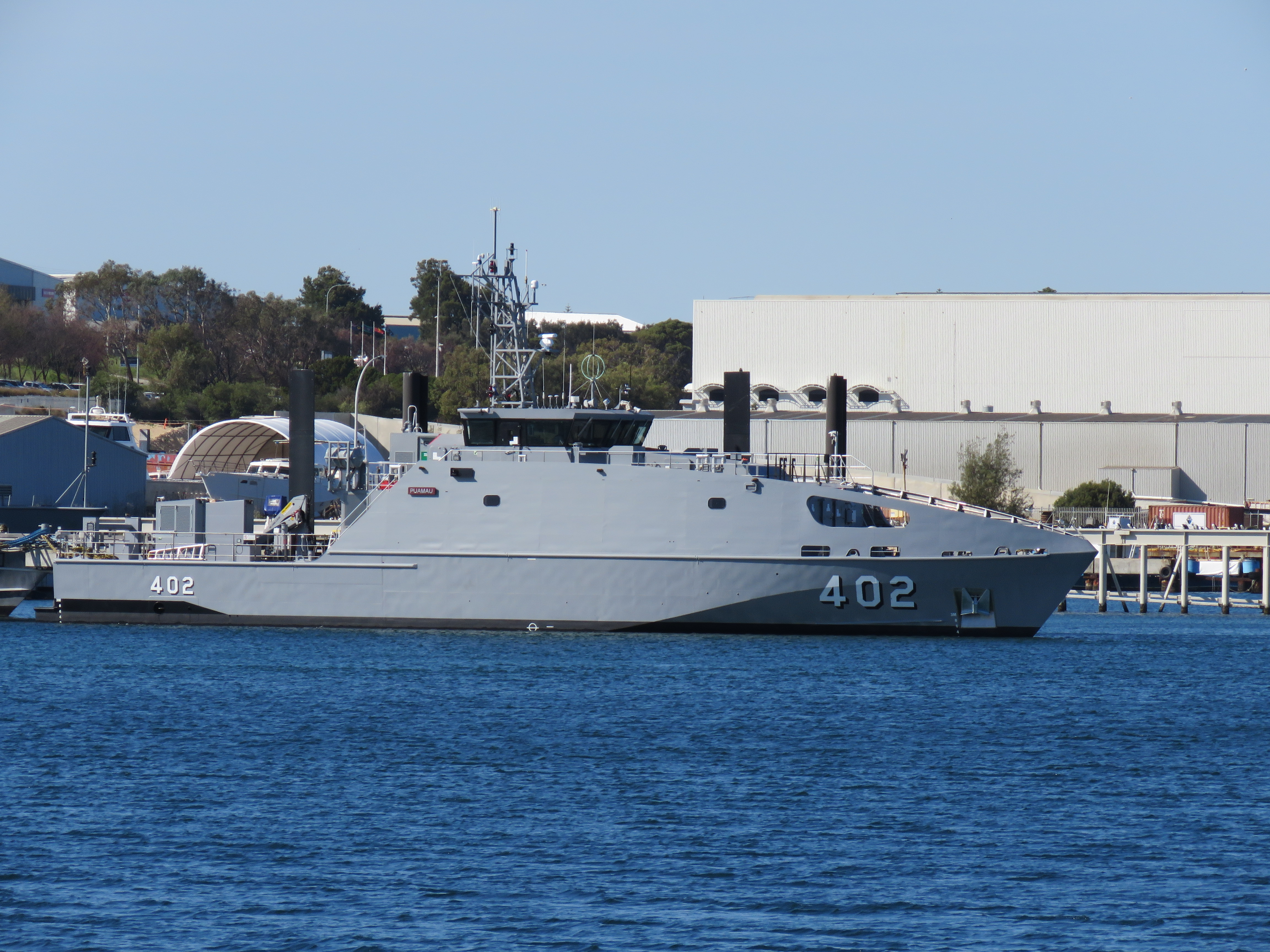
- Sister ship RFNS Puamau in the Austal shipyards in Henderson, Western Australia.

History

Fiji
- Name: Savenaca
- Namesake: Savenaca Naulutuma
- Builder: Austal
- Acquired: 6 March 2020
- Identification: IMO number: 4734154; MMSI number: 520349000; Callsign: 3DPV
- Status: Active

General characteristics
- Class & type: Guardian-class patrol boat
- Length: 39.5 m (129 ft 7 in)
- Beam: 8 m (26 ft 3 in)
- Draft: 0.76 m (2.5 ft)
- Propulsion: 2 × Caterpillar 3516C diesel engines, 2 shafts
- Speed: 20 knots (37 km/h; 23 mph)
- Range: 3,000 nmi (5,600 km; 3,500 mi) at 12 knots (22 km/h; 14 mph)
- Armament: Australia provides the ships without armament, but they are designed to be able to mount heavy machine guns, or an autocannon of up to 30 mm on the foredeck

RFNS Savenaca (401) is a Guardian-class patrol boat, built in Australia for Fiji's Navy. She replaced RFNS Kula, a Pacific Forum patrol vessel provided by Australia in 1994. She will be the seventh vessel of the class to be completed, and the second of two to be delivered to Fiji. She was commissioned in April 2020.

== Design ==
Australia provided 22 Pacific Forum patrol vessels to its smaller neighbours in the Pacific Forum after the United Nations Convention on the Law of the Sea provided maritime nations with 200-kilometre (120 mi) exclusive economic zone. Those vessels were delivered in the late 1980s and early 1990s, and were designed for a service life of approximately 30 years. Australia designed the Guardian class as a slightly larger and more capable replacement.

Like the Pacific Forum vessels the Guardian-class vessels are built using commercial off the shelf components, to make it easier for the vessels to be maintained in small, isolated shipyards.

== Operational career ==
Savenaca was turned over to the Royal Fiji Naval Service, at Austal's Henderson factory, on March 6, 2020. Attending the handover ceremony were Voreqe Bainimarama, Prime Minister of Fiji, Inia Seruiratu, Minister of Defence, Melissa Price, Minister for Defence Industry, and Rear Admiral Viliame Naupoto and Captain Humphrey Tawake, of the Fiji Navy.

Savenaca arrived in Walu Bay on April 28, 2020, where she was greeted by Minister of Defence Inia Seruiratu.

In May 2020, Savenaca was dispatched with humanitarian aid to areas stricken by the COVID-19 virus. Australia had helped by flying in supplies, including a large portable generator.

== Namesake ==
The vessel is named after Savenaca Naulumatua, a Fiji sailor who died serving aboard HMNZS Leander, during the Battle of Kolombangara.
