= Commander of the Republic of Fiji Military Forces =

Highest ranking military office of the Fijian armed forces

Commander of Fiji Military Forces
- Komada ni Mataivalu ni Viti (Fijian); फिजी सैन्य बलों के कमांडर (Fiji Hindi)
- Coat of arms of Fiji

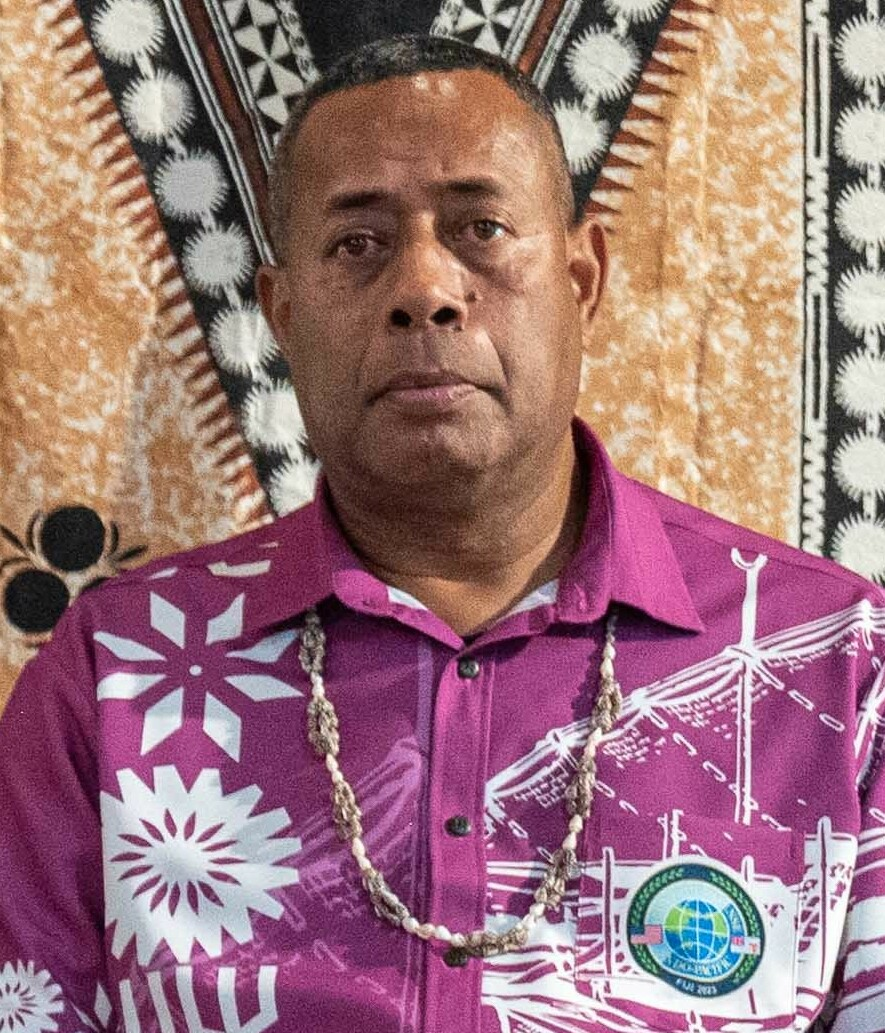
- Incumbent; Brigadier General Jone Kalouniwai since September 2021
- Member of: Republic of Fiji Military Forces
- Reports to: Minister for National Security and Defence
- Appointer: President of the Republic
- Formation: 1971
- First holder: D. J. Aitken
- Unofficial names: Commander RFMF
- Deputy: Deputy Commander
- Website: Official website

The Commander of the Republic of Fiji Military Forces is the highest-ranking military officer of in the Republic of Fiji Military Forces, who is responsible for maintaining the operational command of the military. The current commander is Major General Jone Kalouniwai.

== List of commanders ==
=== British rule ===
During British rule, the commanders were:

No.	Portrait	Commander	Took office	Left office	Time in office
1	?	?	?	?	?
2	William Cunningham	Major general William Cunningham (1883–1959)	1940	1942	1–2 years
3	Owen Mead	Major general Owen Mead (1892–1942)	March 1942	25 July 1942 †	0 years
4	John George Concanon Wales	Brigadier; John George Concanon Wales (1886–1967)	July 1942	1943	0–1 years
5	George Dittmer	Brigadier; George Dittmer (1893–1979)	1943	1945	1–2 years
6	Clive Lochiel Pleasants	Colonel; Clive Lochiel Pleasants (1910–1988)	1949	1953	3–4 years
7	Thomas Coats Campbell	Colonel; Thomas Coats Campbell (1911–1984)	1953	1956	2–3 years
8	J. P. Sanders	Colonel; J. P. Sanders	1956	1958	1–2 years
9	R. W. Foubister	Colonel; R. W. Foubister (1910–?)	1958	1960	1–2 years
10	Robertson Mackay Paterson	Colonel; Robertson Mackay Paterson (1918–1972)	1960	1962	1–2 years
11	Frank Rennie	Colonel; Frank Rennie (1918–1992)	1966	1969	2–3 years
12	John Moore Morris	Colonel; John Moore Morris (1924–2017)	1969	1971	1–2 years

=== Independence ===
No.	Portrait	Commander	Took office	Left office	Time in office	Defence branch	Commander-in-Chief	Ref.
1	D. J. Aitken	Brigadier; D. J. Aitken	1971	1974	2–3 years	Army	Elizabeth II	
2	Paul Manueli	Colonel; Paul Manueli (1934–2019)	1974	1979	4–5 years	Army	Elizabeth II	
3	Ian Thorpe	Colonel; Ian Thorpe	1979	1982	2–3 years	Army	Elizabeth II	
4	Epeli Nailatikau	Colonel; Epeli Nailatikau (born 1941) (Note: Later served as President.)	1982	1987	4–5 years	Army	Elizabeth II	
5	Sitiveni Rabuka	Major general Sitiveni Rabuka (born 1948) (Note: Later served as Prime Minister.)	1987	1992	4–5 years	Army	Elizabeth II; Himself; Ganilau	
6	Epeli Ganilau	Major general Epeli Ganilau (1951–2023)	1992	1 March 1999	6–7 years	Army	Ganilau; Mara	
7	Frank Bainimarama	Commodore; Frank Bainimarama (born 1954)	1 March 1999	5 March 2014	15 years, 4 days	Republic of Fiji Navy	Mara; Himself (twice); Iloilo; Nailatikau	
8	Mosese Tikoitoga	Brigadier; Mosese Tikoitoga	5 March 2014	31 July 2015	1 year, 148 days	Army	Nailatikau	
8	Viliame Naupoto	Rear Admiral; Viliame Naupoto	1 August 2015; Acting until December 2015	16 September 2021	6 years, 46 days	Republic of Fiji Navy	Nailatikau; Konrote	
9	Jone Kalouniwai	Brigadier General; Jone Kalouniwai	September 2021	Incumbent	5 years, 1 month	Army	Konrote; Katonivere	

== See also ==
- Republic of Fiji Military Forces
