= RFNS Volasiga =

The RFNS Volasiga is an oceanic survey vessel operated by the Republic of Fiji Navy. She was donated by the Republic of Korea in 2019. She has a crew of 15.

Fiji and the Korea Hydrographic and Oceanographic Agency (KHOA) cooperate over the vessel's science program.
