= RFNS Kula =

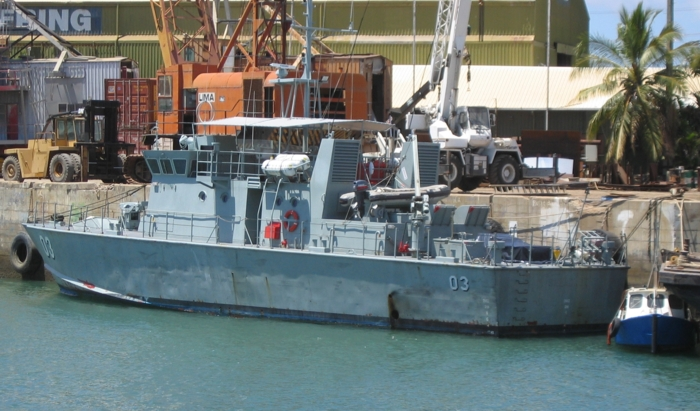
- Sister ship HMPNGS Seeadler is a Pacific Forum patrol boat, operated by Papua New Guinea.

History

Fiji
- Name: Kula
- Launched: 1994
- Identification: IMO number: 9086447
- Status: Decommissioned

General characteristics
- Class & type: Pacific Forum-class patrol boat
- Displacement: 162 tons
- Length: 103 ft (31 m)

RFNS Kula (201) is a Pacific Forum patrol boat operated by Fiji. She was designed and built by Australia and launched in 1994. Australia agreed to provide twenty-two patrol boats to twelve of its neighbours and fellow members of the Pacific Forum, after the recently concluded United Nations Convention on the Law of the Sea extended maritime nations' exclusive economic zone to 200 kilometres (110 nmi). Australia provided two other patrol vessels to Fiji, Kikau and Kiro. Australia also provided training and infrastructure for maintaining the vessels.

== Operational history ==
On June 27, 1994, Kula undertook her first search and rescue expedition, eventually finding and rescuing two young girls from Vanuatu whose punt had gone adrift. The weather was bad and visibility poor when she arrived at the search site over twelve hours later, and her commander, Viliame Nauputo, requested the assistance of a French Navy aircraft, from Noumea.

In 2004 armed crew-members boarded and captured a pirate fishing vessel.

In June 2017 Kula rescued four New Zealand businessmen when their yacht was wrecked in Fijian waters.

Although Australia designed the vessels using commercial off-the-shelf components for ease of maintenance, Fiji found the vessels hard to maintain, and there were periods that only Kula remained operational.

A decommissioning ceremony was held on December 22, 2019, prior to Kula's final voyage to Australia, for disassembly. Rear Admiral Viliame Naupoto, the commanding officer of the Fiji Military Forces, spoke at the ceremony. Naupoto had served aboard Kula's commissioning voyage in 1994. Kula departed for Australia on January 20, 2020.

== Replacement ==
Australia started building 21 larger and more capable replacement vessels in 2017. Fiji is scheduled to receive two new vessels. RFNS Savenaca will replace Kula is scheduled to be delivered in March 2020.
