= RFNS Kacau =

RFNS Kacau is a hydrographic survey vessel donated by China to the Republic of Fiji Naval Service in 2019. With the capacity for approximately 30 crewmembers she will be Fiji's largest vessel.

Kacai is a catamaran, and has a deck area that can accommodate deck cargo and standard sized shipping containers.
