= RFNS Kiro (203) =

Pacific Forum patrol boat operated by Fiji

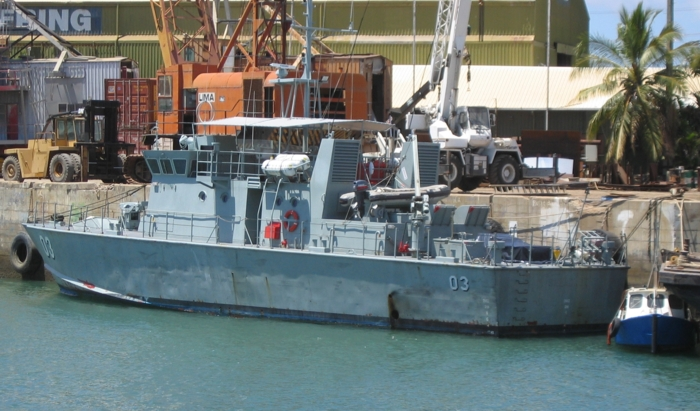
- Sister ship HMPNGS Seeadler is a Pacific Forum patrol boat, operated by Papua New Guinea.

History

Fiji
- Name: Kiro
- Launched: 1996
- Commissioned: 1996
- Decommissioned: 2016
- Identification: IMO number: 9086473
- Status: Abandoned, after cast ashore during a cyclone

General characteristics
- Class & type: Pacific Forum-class patrol boat
- Displacement: 162 tons
- Length: 103 ft (31 m)

RFNS Kiro (203) was one of three Pacific Forum patrol boats operated by Fiji. She was the last of the three to be launched, in May 1995, and the first to be retired, when she ran aground and was deemed unsalvable, in 2016.

== Background ==
Shortly after the United Nations Convention on the Law of the Sea extended a 200-kilometre (108 nmi) exclusive economic zone (EEZ) to all maritime nations, Australia agreed to design, build, and then donate small patrol vessels to its smaller fellow members of the Pacific Forum, so they could exercise sovereignty over their extended EEZs. In addition to Kiro, Kula and Kikau Australia provided to Fiji, Australia provided 19 other vessels to 11 other small maritime countries, delivered between 1985 and 1995. Australia has designed and will build a new, larger and more capable replacement class, the Guardian-class patrol boats, which will be delivered from 2018 to 2023.

== Design ==
Like her sister ships Kiro displaced 160 tonnes, and her top speed was 24 knots (44 km/h; 28 mph). They used commercial off the shelf equipment, rather than cutting-edge military grade equipment, as ease of maintenance was more important than high performance.

== Operational history ==
Kiro ran aground during bad weather, on July 19, 2016. Attempts were made to salvage her, but, after four months, she was written off, and the decision was made to leave the wreck on the Cakauyawa Reef.
