= Ministry of Defence and National Security (Fiji) =

Government ministry of Fiji

- Coat of arms of Fiji

Agency overview
- Jurisdiction: Republic of Fiji
- Annual budget: $13.8m FJD (2020-2021)
- Minister responsible: Pio Tikoduadua, Minister for Defence and National Security
- Website: defence.gov.fj

The Ministry of Defence and National Security is the ministry of Fiji responsible for advising the government on strategic leadership, policy guidance and overseeing the Republic of the Fiji Military Forces. The current Minister for Defence and National Security is Pio Tikoduadua who was appointed to the position in December 2022.

== Responsibilities ==
The Ministry is tasked in managing the nation's security and it does this through policies, programmes and projects. The ministry is also tasked in maintaining public order and responding to national emergencies. Other responsibilities include aerial surveillance and search and rescue.

== List of ministers ==
No.	Portrait	Name (born–died)	Term of office			Political party	Government	Ref.
No.	Portrait	Name (born–died)	Took office	Left office	Time in office	Political party	Government	Ref.
		Epeli Ganilau (1951–2023)	January 2007	November 2010	3 years, 10 months	National Alliance Party of Fiji	Bainimarama I	
–		Joketani Cokanasiga (c. 1936–2021) acting	November 2010			FijiFirst	Bainimarama I	
		Timoci Natuva (born 1957)	25 September 2014	31 August 2016	1 year, 341 days	FijiFirst	Bainimarama II	
–		Frank Bainimarama (born 1954) acting	31 August 2016	9 September 2016	9 days	FijiFirst	Bainimarama II	
		Inoke Kubuabola (born 1948)	9 September 2016	20 November 2018	2 years, 74 days	FijiFirst	Bainimarama II	
		Inia Seruiratu	22 November 2018	24 December 2022	4 years, 32 days	FijiFirst	Bainimarama II	
		Pio Tikoduadua (born 1966)	24 December 2022	Incumbent	3 years, 27 days	National Federation Party	Rabuka II	

== See also ==
- Republic of Fiji Military Forces
