= Jone Kalouniwai =

Fijian military Commander

Major General Ro Jone Kalouniwai
- Born: 7 July 1968 (age 58)
- Alma mater: Central Queensland University (MBA); University of Madras (MS); Deakin University (MPP)
- Spouse: Folaukitoga Pareti Logavatu
- Children: 6
- Military career
- Allegiance: Fiji
- Branch: Republic of Fiji Military Forces
- Rank: Major general
- Unit: Officers Corp
- Commands: Commander of the Republic of Fiji Military Forces; National Security and Intelligence; Multinational Force and Observers; United Nations Interim Force in Lebanon; 2nd Battalion of the Fiji Infantry Regiment; United Nations Disengagement Observer Force

Ro Jone Logavatu Kalouniwai is a major general in the Republic of Fiji Military Forces (RFMF) who currently serves as the commander of the Republic of Fiji Military Forces since 16 September 2021. Previously named as director general of National Security and Intelligence, Ministry of Defence and National Security from May 2020 to September 2021, he also served as section commander in Lebanon and instructor at the RFMF Training School.

Prior to his appointment as commander of RFMF, he was promoted to the rank of major general by the prime minister of Fiji on 4 October 2021.

== Career ==
Kalouniwai joined the RFMF on 23 October 1987, however he was commissioned into the Officers Corp on 10 May 1992.

Kalouniwai obtained military courses in Fiji in addition to receiving his training in New Zealand, Taiwan, India and Australia. While attending defense and peace keeping seminars, he visited the United States, United Kingdom, Sweden, Nepal, and South Korea. A graduate of the Australian War College, 2019, he also obtained defense training from Defence Services Staff College, India in 2008.

He obtained his executive certificate in management from the Australian Maritime College, diploma in management from Central Queensland University, and MBA from the same university. He received his master's degree in defense and strategic studies from the University of Madras, Policy studies from Deakin University.

As a commissioned officer, he was deployed at various units and participated in various missions with the Multinational Force and Observers in Sinai and Egypt, in addition to serving in the United Nations Interim Force in Lebanon, East Timor, Iraq, and the Golan Heights, Syria. During that period, Kalouniwai was assigned various command and staff appointments. His last command appointment was at the Multinational Force and Observers, Sinai Peninsula where he commanded 2nd Battalion of the Fiji Infantry Regiment.

His last staff appointment includes as a colonel in Syria at the UN mission Chief of Staff for the United Nations Disengagement Observer Force where he was assigned to oversee the operational and strategic functions of the MFO's headquarter from 2014–15 and 2015-16.

== Awards and decorations ==

Officer- French Order of Merit	Officer- Order of Fiji	Fiji Command Medal	Fiji General Service Medal
UNIFIL Peacekeeping Medal	Multinational Force and Observers Medal	UNMISET Peacekeeping Medal	United Nations Special Service Medal
UNDOF Peacekeeping Medal	Meritorious Service Decoration	Fiji Republic Medal	50th Anniversary medal
