= RFNS Kikau =

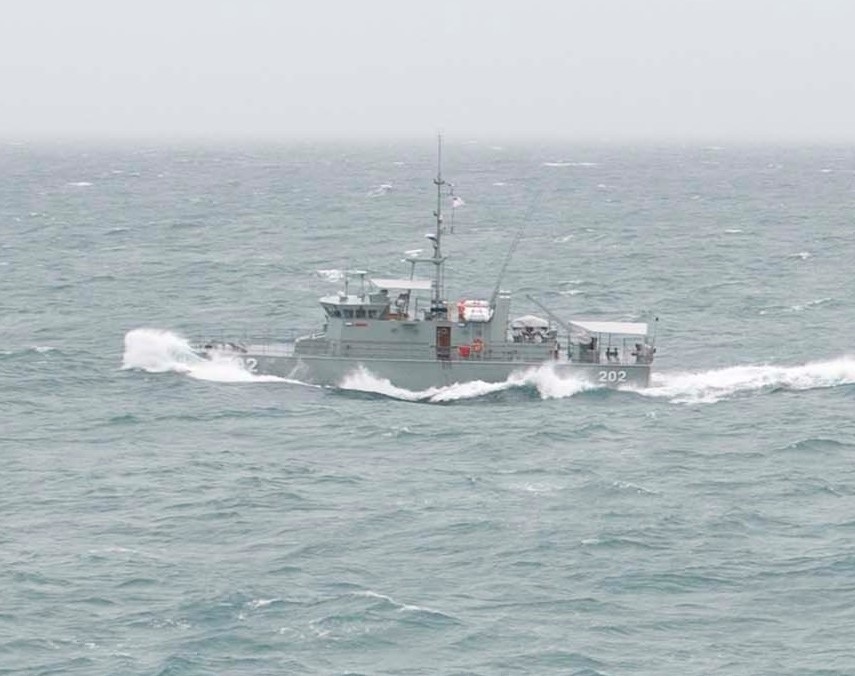

History

Fiji
- Name: Kikau
- Launched: 1995
- Identification: IMO number: 9086461; MMSI number: 520003000; Callsign: 3DPH
- Status: Ship in active service

General characteristics
- Class & type: Pacific Forum-class patrol boat
- Displacement: 162 tons
- Length: 103 ft (31 m)

RFNS Kikau (202) is a Pacific-class patrol boat operated by Fiji and launched in 1995. She was designed and built by Australia. Australia agreed to provide twenty-two patrol boats to twelve of its neighbours and fellow members of the Pacific Forum, after the recently concluded United Nations Convention on the Law of the Sea extended maritime nations' exclusive economic zone to 200 kilometres (110 nmi). Australia provided two other patrol vessels to Fiji, Kula and Kiro. Australia also provided training and infrastructure for the gifted vessels.

== Operational history ==
Although Australia designed the vessels using commercial off-the-shelf components, so smaller countries, like Fiji, would find them easier to maintain, Fiji found the vessels hard to maintain, and there were periods where only Kula remained operational.

Kikau completed an extensive refit at Cairns, Australia on July 25, 2018.

== Replacement ==
Australia started building 21 larger and more capable replacement vessels in 2017. Fiji is scheduled to receive two new vessels. Kikau is expected to remain in service until 2022.
