= VOEA Ngahau Siliva =

Tongan naval vessel

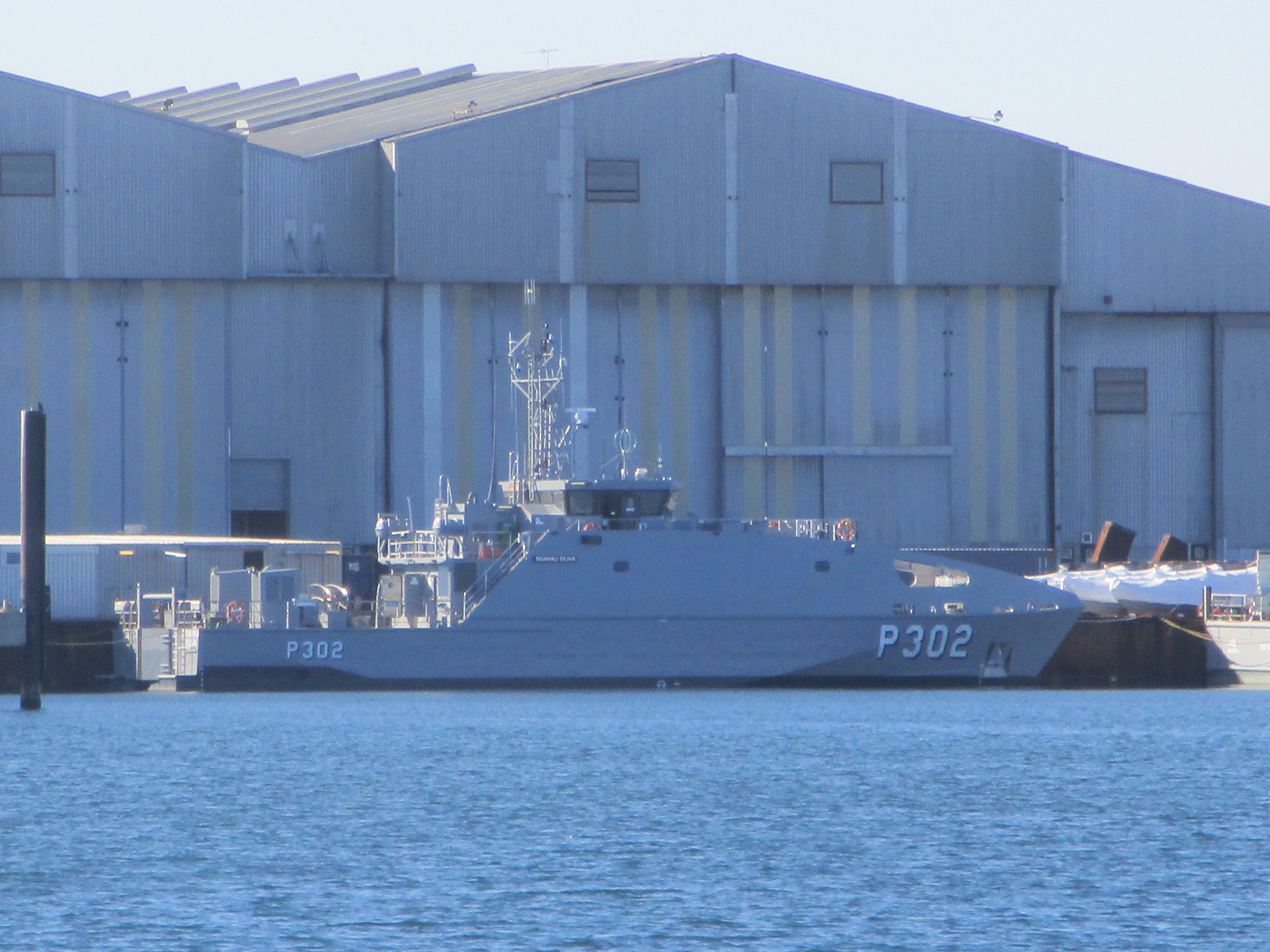
- VOEA Ngahau Siliva (P302) at Austal shipyards in Henderson, Western Australia, 1 August 2020.

History

Tonga
- Name: VOEA Ngahau Siliva
- Acquired: 30 October 2020
- Identification: IMO number: 4734180; MMSI number: 570316000; Callsign: A3CR
- Status: Sea trials

General characteristics
- Class & type: Guardian-class patrol vessel

VOEA Ngahau Siliva (P302) is the second of Tonga's two Guardian-class patrol vessels. She is the eighth vessel of the 21 vessels in her class.

== Design ==
After the United Nations Convention on the Law of the Sea established that all maritime nations were entitled to exercise control over a 200-kilometre (120 mi) exclusive economic zone, Australia agreed to give small patrol boats to Tonga and eleven other neighbours in the Pacific Islands Forum.

Tonga was given three Pacific Forum-class patrol vessels in 1989, 1990 and 1991, VOEA Neiafu, VOEA Pangai and VOEA Savea. Those vessels were designed to have a working life of at least 30 years, so Australia designed the Guardian class, a slightly larger, and more capable replacement class. Australia delivered her sister ship, the second vessel of her class, VOEA Ngahau Koula, to Tonga on June 21, 2019.

== Operational career ==
She was formally handed over to Tonga on 30 October 2020, at Austal's shipyard in Henderson, Western Australia. The handover was attended by High Commissioner Princess Angelika Latufuipeka Tuku'aho and Lieutenant Colonel Tevita Siu Fifita, representing Tonga, and Melissa Price the Minister for Defence Industry and Rear Admiral Wendy Malcolm, representing Australia.

The vessel arrived at her home port, Nuku'alofa, on 16 December 2020. To prevent the possibility of spreading infection of the COVID-19 virus her crew were placed under quarantine.

HM King Tupou VI commissioned the vessel on January 27, 2021.
