= Law enforcement in Palau =

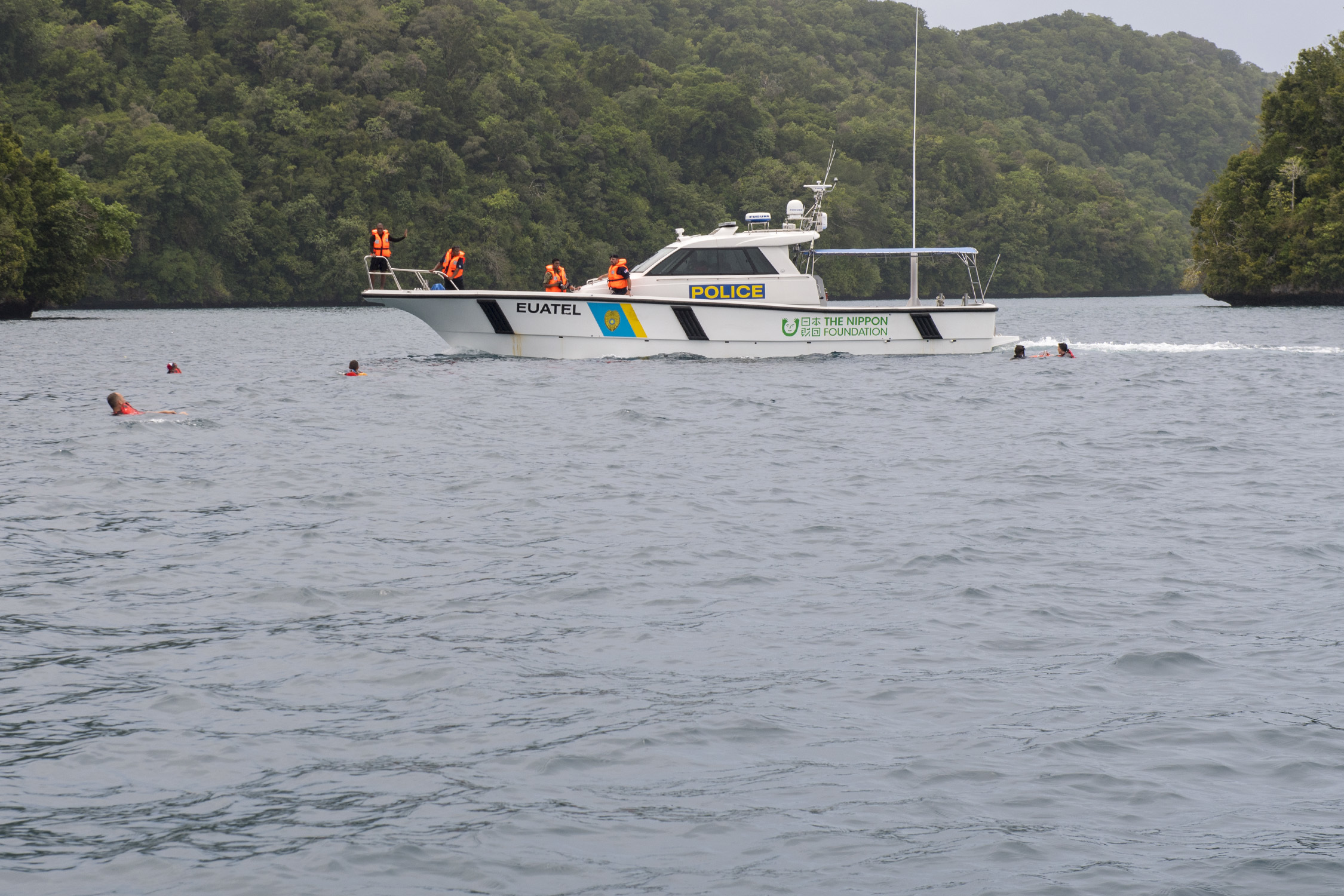
The Euatel, Kabekl M'tal and Bul provide littoral fishery protection.

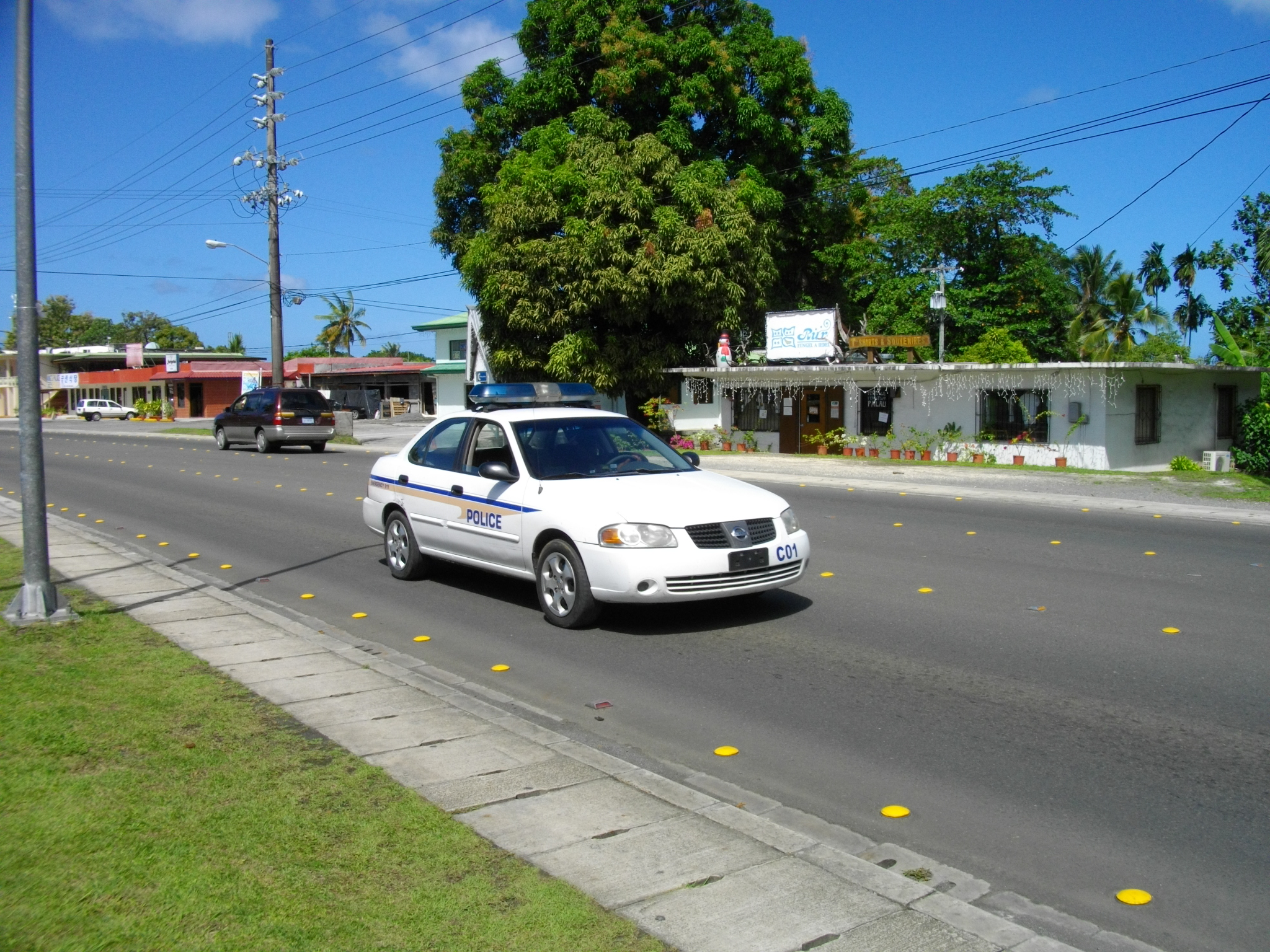
A Palauan police car

The defense of Palau is the responsibility of the United States, but local police matters are handled by the Palau Police, the national police force. Some of the sixteen states also had separate police departments during the 1980s and 1990s.

== Organisation ==
The Palau Bureau of Public Division of Marine Law Enforcement (DMLE) is responsible for marine surveillance, maritime law enforcement, search and rescue in Palau's territorial waters and its 200 nm exclusive economic zone (EEZ).

The Bureau of Public Safety Director is Aloysius Alonz. Palau has provided police officers to the Regional Assistance Mission to Solomon Islands.

Where, Palauan Police officer Bryson Ngiratumerang was contingent commander of the Palauan police serving as part of RAMSI's Participating Police Force (PPF).

The Palau Division of Maritime Law Enforcement has approximately 30 staff, 5 of which are paid for by The Nippon Foundation.

== Equipment ==
=== Small arms ===
Model	Origin	Calibre	Type	Amount	Notes	References
M4 carbine	United States	5.56×45mm NATO	Assault rifle	15		
M2 Browning	United States	.50 BMG	Heavy machine gun	4	In use aboard PSS Kedam and PSS Remeliik II	

=== Others ===
Model	Type	Amount	Notes
AeroVironment RQ-20 Puma	Unmanned aerial vehicle	Unknown	Entry into service in December 2020
Cessna Skymaster	Maritime patrol aircraft	1	Operated by Technology Service Corporation on the behalf of the United States Air Force

== Ships ==
The DMLE operated a Pacific-class patrol boat, the PSS President H.I. Remeliik which has been replaced by the PSS Remeliik II. They also operate the PPS Kedam for use in maritime surveillance and fisheries control over Palau's EEZ. Its home port is Koror.

The DMLE also operate three smaller 15-meter inshore patrol vessels, Euatel, Kabekl M'tal and Bul, used for surveillance of inshore and territorial waters.

The Remeliik was donated and is maintained by Australia, who also provide training for the crew. The other four vessels were donated by The Nippon Foundation and The Sasakawa Peace Foundation.

=== Current ===
- PSS Remeliik II
- PSS Kedam
- PSS Euatel
- PSS Kabekl M'tal
- PSS Bul
- Rigid Hulled Inflatable Boat
- Twin 85 hp boat

=== Former ===
- PSS Remeliik
