= VOEA Ngahau Koula =

VOEA Ngahau Koula may refer to the following ships

- VOEA Ngahau Koula (P101), the first vessel in the Tonga Maritime Force
- VOEA Ngahau Koula (P301), a Guardian-class patrol vessel, given to Tonga by Australia
