= VOEA Late =

VOEA Late is the name of the following ships of the Tonga Maritime Force:

- VOEA Late (A401), commissioned in 2015
- VOEA Late (A402), commissioned in 2025

== See also ==
- Late (disambiguation)
