= VOEA Ngahau Koula (P301) =

Ship built in 2019

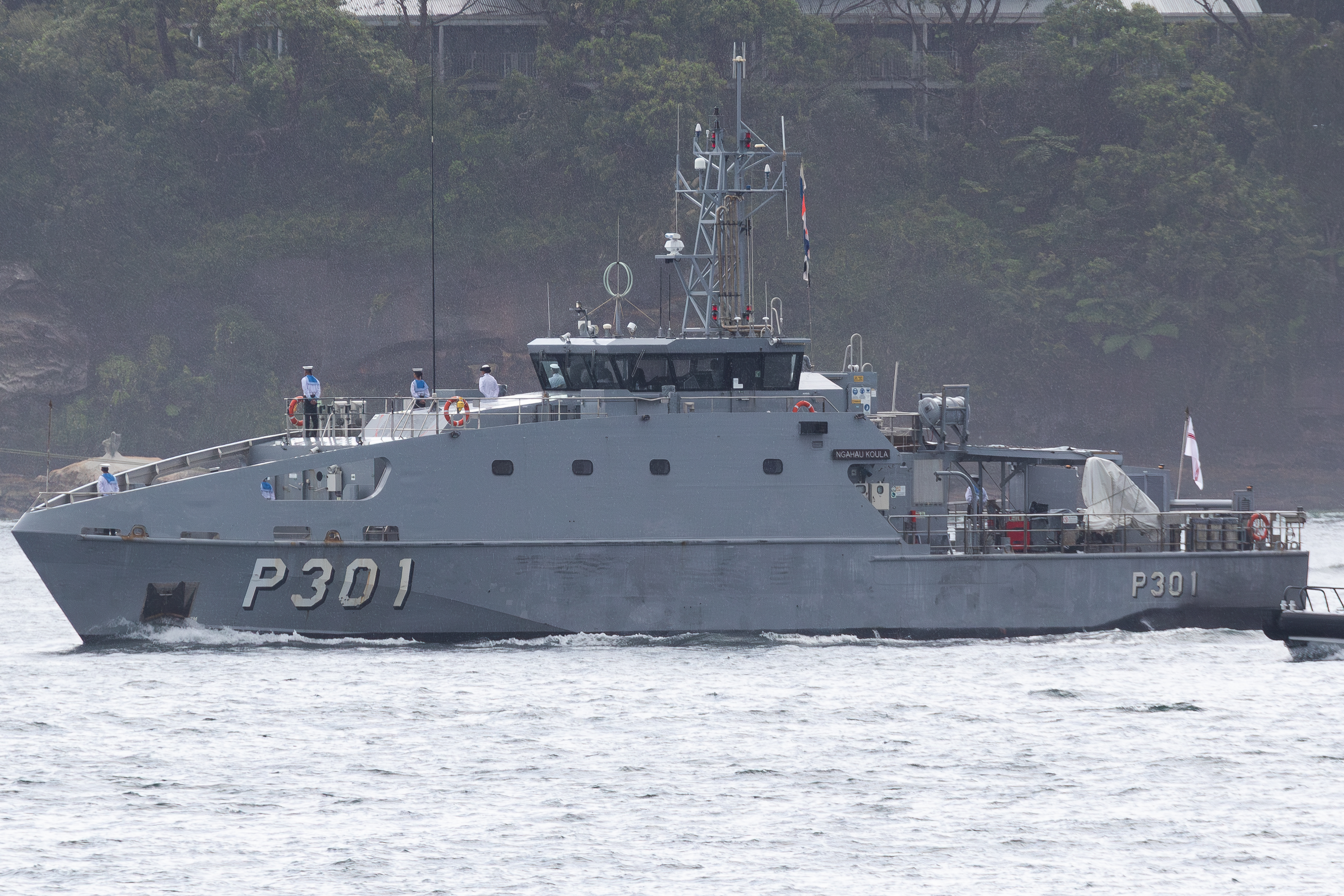
- VOEA Ngahau Koula (P301)

History

Tonga
- Name: VOEA Ngahau Koula
- Acquired: June 21, 2019
- Commissioned: October 16, 2019
- Identification: IMO number: 4734128; MMSI number: 570315000; Callsign: A3CC
- Status: In service

General characteristics
- Class & type: Guardian-class patrol vessel

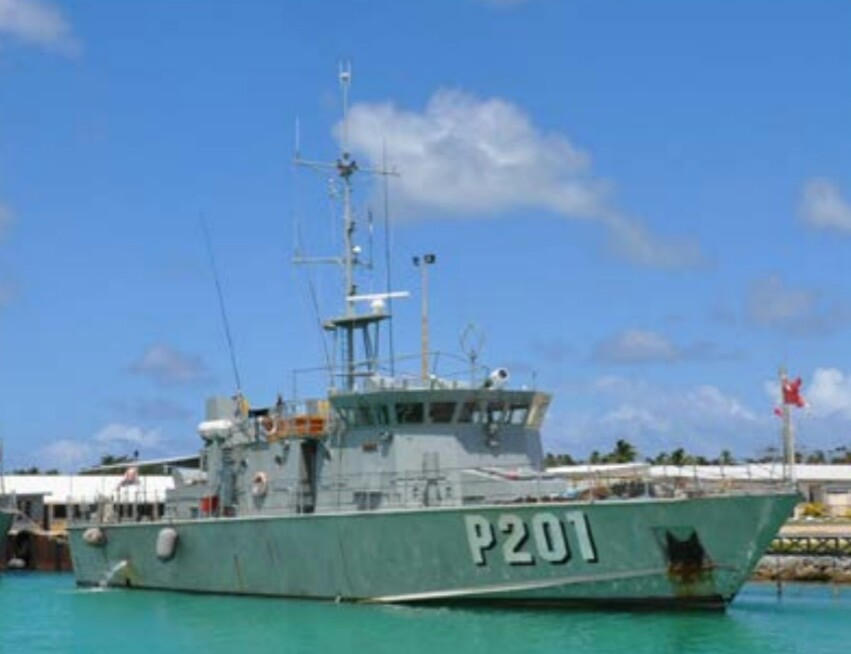
Ngahau Koula replaced Neiafu, launched in 1989

VOEA Ngahau Koula (P301) is a Guardian-class patrol vessel designed and built for the Tonga Maritime Force by Australia. After the United Nations Convention on the Law of the Sea established that all maritime nations were entitled to exercise control over a 200-kilometre (120 mi) exclusive economic zone, Australia agreed to give small patrol boats to Tonga and eleven other neighbours in the Pacific Islands Forum.

Tonga was given three Pacific Forum-class patrol vessels in 1989, 1990 and 1991, VOEA Neiafu, VOEA Pangai and VOEA Savea. Those vessels were designed to have a working life of at least 30 years, so Australia designed the Guardian class, a slightly larger, and more capable replacement class. Australia delivered Ngahau Koula to Tonga on June 21, 2019. A second replacement vessel will follow in 2021.

The vessel's name means "Golden Arrow". She has been designed to be able to accommodate crews of mixed gender.

== Operation career ==
Nahagau Koula was commissioned by King Tupou VI on October 16, 2019.

The vessel was involved in the response to the 2022 Hunga Tonga–Hunga Ha'apai eruption and tsunami, evacuating all residents of Mango island to Tongatapu.

King Tupou VI sailed aboard Nahagau Koula as his official vessel during an international fleet review in honor of his 65th birthday and 50th anniversary of the Royal Tongan Navy on 4 July 2024. Eleven ships from ten countries participated in the review at Nuku’alofa including Australia's HMAS Choules, China's Zibo, Japan's JS Noshiro, New Zealand's HMNZS Manawanui, the United Kingdom's HMS Tamar, and the American USCGC Harriet Lane.

On 4 September 2025, Ngahau Koula participated in the mobile Fleet Review in the event of the 50th Independence Day of Papua New Guinea. The review was held at the Port Moresby harbour and was conducted and led by INS Kadmatt. A total of seven warships from five nations took part in the review formation, with the other ships being the French patrol vessel Auguste Bénébig, HMPNGS Gilbert Toropo, HMPNGS Ted Diro, HMPNGS Rochus Lokinap and HMAS Childers. Each ship sailed at an interval of 550 metres (600 yd) with precision.
