= VOEA Pangai =

Patrol vessel

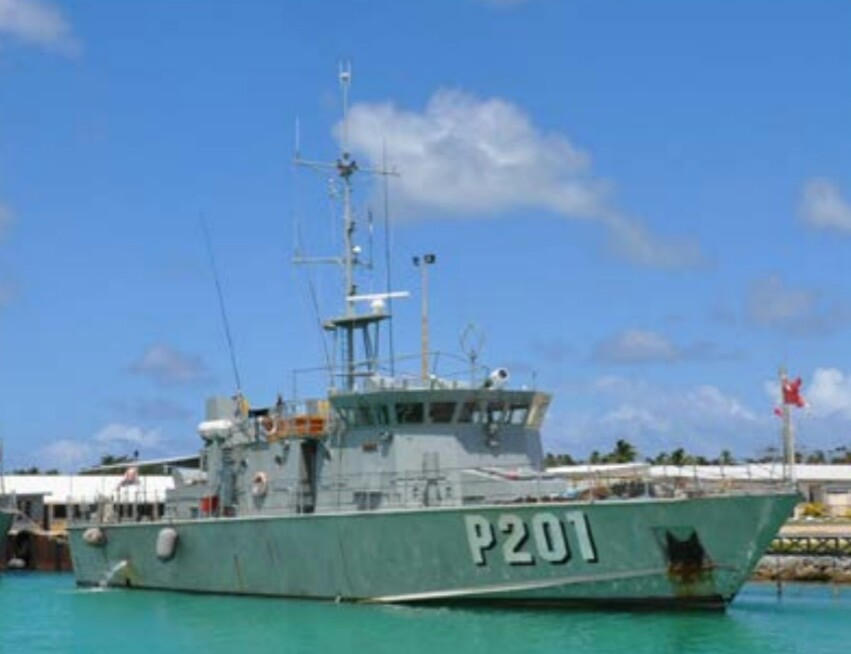
- Sister ship VOEA Neiafu in 2016

History

Tonga
- Name: Pangai
- Commissioned: June 1990
- Decommissioned: 23 April 2020
- Refit: February 2009
- Status: Awaiting scrapping

General characteristics
- Class & type: Pacific Forum-class patrol boat
- Displacement: 162 tons
- Length: 103 ft (31 m)

VOEA Pangai (P202) was a Pacific Forum patrol vessel of Tonga, operated by the Tonga Maritime Force.

== Background ==
When the United Nations Convention on the Law of the Sea extended maritime nations' exclusive economic zone (EEZ) to 200 kilometres (110 nmi), Australia designed and built 22 patrol vessels for 12 of its fellow members of the Pacific Forum. Australia provided the patrol vessels free of charge, and helped build port facilities and provide training. This allowed its neighbours to exercise sovereignty over their EEZ, intercept smugglers, poaching fishers, and provide emergency services.

Australia is replacing Pangai and her two sister ships with two larger and more capable Guardian-class patrol vessels.

== Design ==
The 31.5-metre (103 ft) vessels displace 162 tonnes, and are built using commercial off-the-shelf (COTS) equipment, instead of more expensive, high-performance, military-grade equipment, to ease the maintenance burden, since local maintenance will be performed in small, isolated shipyards.

== Operational history ==
Pangai was assigned to a peacekeeping mission in Bougainville, in 1994. Tonga's King Tupou VI served in the Navy when he was a prince, and he was Pangai's first commanding officer. He was the commanding officer in 1994, during the peacekeeping mission. In 2009, after 20 years of service, Pangai returned to Australia for a major refit.

Pangai provided disaster assistance, following a 2009 tsunami, to Niuafo’ou, and following Tropical Cyclone Winston, in Fiji, in 2016. In 2016 Pangai participated in a joint exercise with vessels of other nations. In January 2015 Pangai carried volcanologists to study ash eruption from a new volcanic island that surfaced between the islands of Hunga Tonga and Hunga Ha'apai.

In 2017 Pangai found, and rescued, six lost fishermen. Pangai was decommissioned on April 23, 2020, prior to her last voyage to Australia, to be scrapped. Australia has already sent one larger and more capable patrol vessel, VOEA Ngahau Koula, to replace Pangai and her sister ships, VOEA Neiafu and VOEA Savea. A second Guardian-class patrol vessel will complete the replacement program.
