= Pikelet =

Pikelet may refer to:

- a regional name for a crumpet
- a small pancake in Australia and New Zealand
- the stage name of Australian musician Evelyn Morris

== See also ==
- Pikelot, an island in the State of Yap, Federated States of Micronesia
