= Tongan Maritime Force =

Tonga Royal Navy
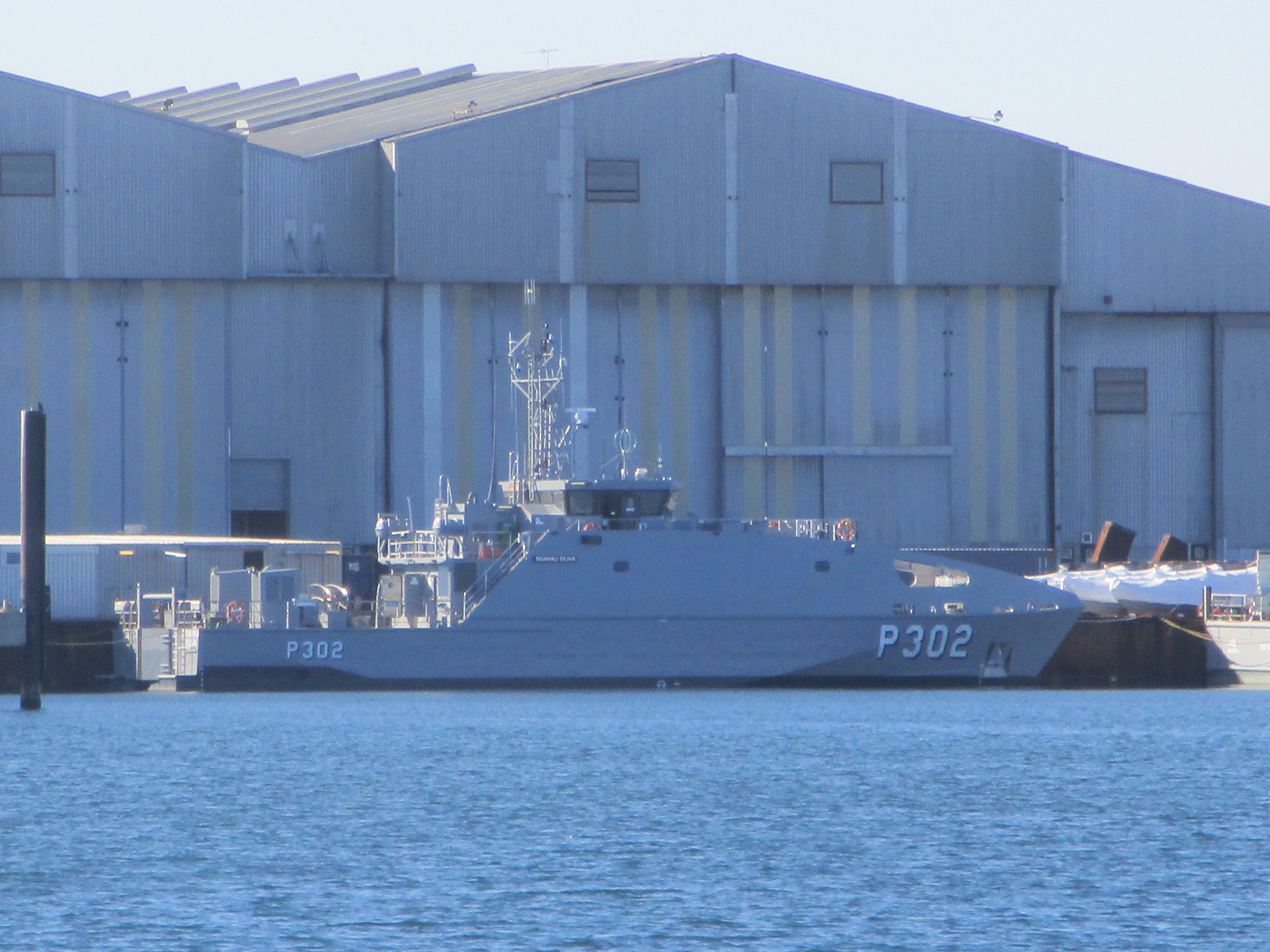
- The Tongan patrol boat VOEA Ngahau Siliva P302 at Henderson, Western Australia
- Active: 10 August 2020
- Country: Tonga
- Branch: His Majesty's Armed Forces of Tonga
- Type: Maritime patrol
- Role: Maritime interdiction Visit, board, search, and seizure Maritime search and rescue Law enforcement Support amphibious landing operations
- Size: 140 personnel

Commanders
- Current commander: Commander Taniela Tuita

Insignia
- Naval ensign

- Naval jack

The Tongan Maritime Force is the sea arm of His Majesty's Armed Forces of Tonga. Its primary roles include maritime patrol, search and rescue, law enforcement and supporting humanitarian assistance and disaster relief across Tonga's vast exclusive economic zone.

Tonga is an island country in Polynesia, The country is made up of 171 islands of which 45 are inhabited, Tonga was first inhabited about 400 years BC and grew into a regional power. It was a thalassocracy that conquered and controlled unprecedented swathes of the Pacific, including parts of the Solomon Islands and the whole of New Caledonia and Fiji in the west to Samoa and Niue its military history is of expeditionary warfare from the Sea, up to European discovery in 1616 and the bringing of Christianity to the Tonga Islands.

== Mission ==
The Tongan Maritime Force's mission within HMAF is to "Defend the sovereignty of the Kingdom of Tonga".

== Operations ==
The Tongan Maritime Force conducts maritime security operation, Including countering illegal fishing and transnational crime, and providing logistical support between Tonga's many islands.

== Diving Team ==
The Tongan Maritime Force maintains a trained and certified Diving Team, which can perform underwater Investigation, search and recovery tasks down to a depth of 60 Meters. Diving Certification is by the Component Commander of the Maritime Force (CCMF).

== Boarding Teams ==
Dedicated Boarding Teams are embarked on Patrol vessels with specialised equipment to enhance boarding capabilities. In September 2025, the Japanese Maritime Self Defense Force conducted a training program for Tongan personnel that covered "Maritime Boarding, Search and Seizure".

== International cooperation ==
Tonga works closely with international partners, including Australia, New Zealand, and Japan, who provide significant support through the Pacific Maritime Security Program. This includes gifting vessels, maintenance support, and extensive training programs.

== History ==
The Tongan Maritime Force was founded on 10 March 1973 by King Tāufaʻāhau Tupou IV, who also commissioned the first craft on that date. The first craft commissioned were VOEA Ngahau Koula (P101) and VOEA Ngahau Siliva (P102), meaning Golden Arrow and Silver Arrow, respectively. They were crewed by volunteers and are no longer in service.

In subsequent years, additional vessels were added to the fleet, including:

- VOEA Savea: A Pacific-class patrol boat, commissioned in 1989, provided by Australia as part of the Pacific Patrol Boat Program. It was decommissioned in 2019.
- VOEA Pangai: A Pacific-class patrol boat, also part of the Pacific Patrol Boat Program, commissioned in 1990. It was decommissioned in 2020.
- VOEA Neiafu: Another Pacific-class patrol boat, also gifted by Australia, which was commissioned alongside VOEA Pangai. It was decommissioned in 2020.
- VOEA Late-gifted by the Australia Department of Defence in 2025. The gift was part of Australia's pacific Maritime Security Program.

These ships were vital for Tonga's maritime interdiction, maritime search and rescue, maritime security,support amphibious warfare, and law enforcement until they were decommissioned and replaced by the newer vessels, VOEA Ngahau Koula (P301) and VOEA Ngahau Siliva (P302).

== List of craft ==
=== Patrol Boat Flotilla ===
The Guardian-class patrol craft were provided to Tonga by Australia as part of the Pacific Patrol Boat Program. As of September 2021, the Tongan Maritime Force has two patrol vessels:

Type	Class	Origin	Displacement	Name	Pennant number	Commissioned	Homeport
Patrol boat	Guardian class	Australia	325 tonnes	VOEA Ngahau Koula	P301	2019	Touliki Base, Nukuʻalofa
Patrol boat	Guardian class	Australia	325 tonnes	VOEA Ngahau Siliva	P302	2021	Touliki Base, Nukuʻalofa

=== Logistic Support Flotilla ===
	Type	Class	Origin	Displacement	Name	Pennant number	Commissioned	Homeport
No image	Landing craft	LR+100 A1 SSC Mono Cargo(A)G4	Australia		VOEA Late	A402	2025	Touliki Base, Nukuʻalofa

=== Royal yacht ===
Type	Class	Origin	Displacement	Name	Pennant number	Commissioned	Homeport
Royal yacht				Titilupe		1984	Touliki Base, Nukuʻalofa

=== Decommissioned ships ===
The following ships have been decommissioned from active service:

Type	Class	Origin	Displacement	Name	Pennant number	Commissioned	Decommissioned
Patrol boat	Pacific class	Australia	162 tonnes	VOEA Neiafu	P201	1988	2020
Patrol boat	Pacific class	Australia	162 tonnes	VOEA Pangai	P202	1989	2019
Patrol boat	Pacific class	Australia	162 tonnes	VOEA Savea	P203	1990	2019
Landing craft	LCM 8	Australia	113 tonnes	VOEA Late	C315	1982	2015
Coastal Tanker	DnV+1A1 Tanker	France	4000 Tonnes	VOEA Lomipeau	A301	1996	2002
Patrol boat	Lowestoft class	UK	Unknown	VOEA Ngahau Koula	P101	1973	1990
Patrol boat	Lowestoft class	UK	Unknown	VOEA Ngahau Siliva	P102	1976	1990
