= PSS Kedam =

Patrol boat of Palau

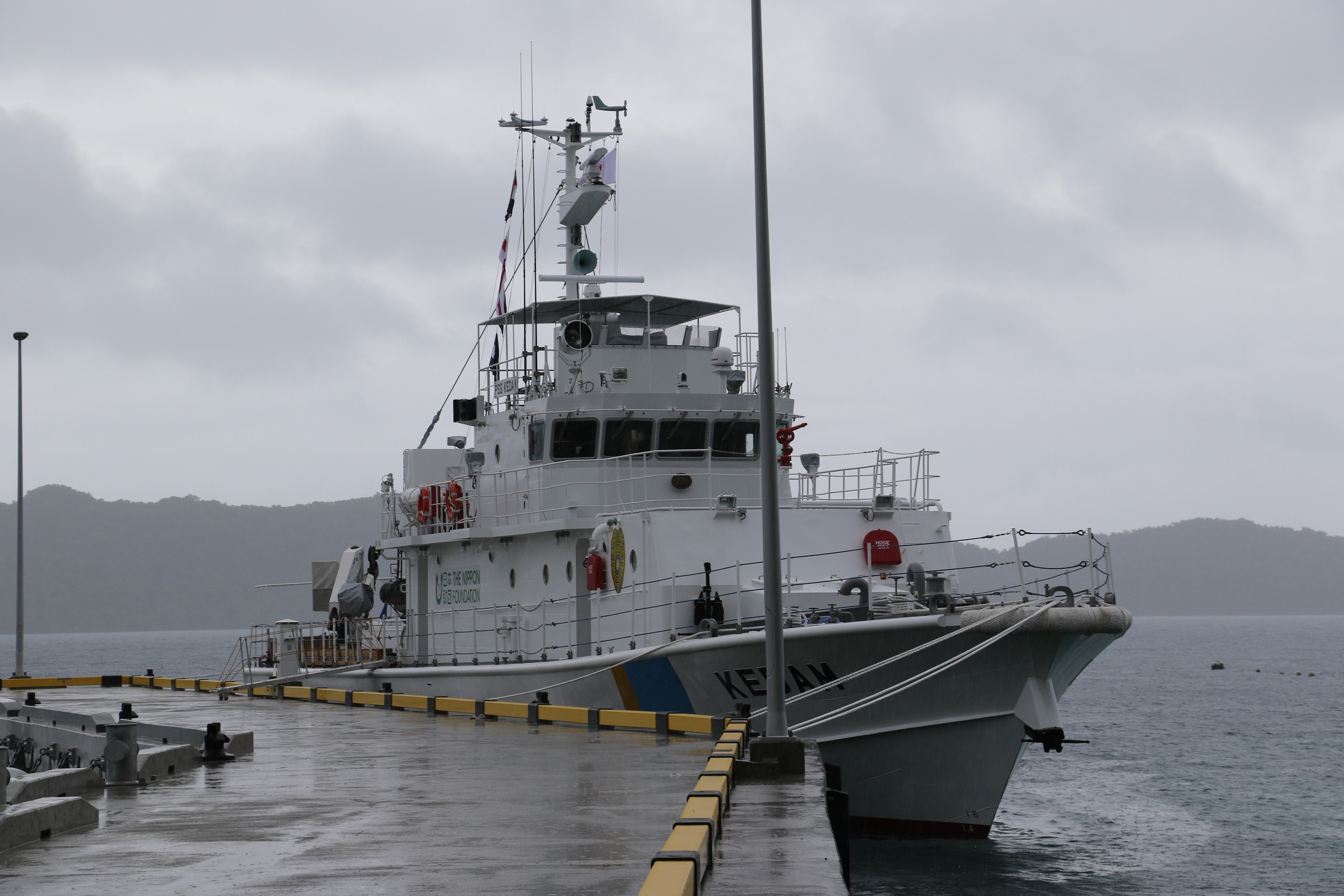
- PSS Kedam on 19 December 2017

History

Palau
- Name: PSS Kedam
- Namesake: Great Frigate Bird of Palau
- Builder: Kegoya Dock, Kure, Japan
- Laid down: 22 June 2017
- Launched: 13 September 2017
- Christened: 18 September 2017
- Commissioned: 13 February 2018
- Identification: IMO number: 9820051; MMSI number: 511000500; Callsign: T8AJ
- Status: in active service

General characteristics
- Displacement: 257 t
- Length: 40 m (131 ft 3 in)
- Propulsion: Diesel engine output: 2 × 1,330 kW (1,790 shp)
- Speed: 25 knots (46 km/h; 29 mph) maximum
- Range: 300 nmi (560 km; 350 mi)
- Endurance: 10 days
- Boats & landing craft carried: 1 × RHIB work boat
- Complement: 21

PSS Kedam is a 40-metre (130 ft) patrol boat, donated by the Nippon Foundation and Sasakawa Peace Foundation to Palau, to help it patrol its exclusive economic zone.

== History ==
The vessel arrived on 22 December 2017, to join the slightly smaller 31.5-metre (103 ft) PSS Remeliik, donated by Australia in 1996. The vessel cost US$30 million. The donors also constructed a berth to moor and maintain the vessel, and committed to cover the vessel's fuel and maintenance costs until 2027.

Fleet-mate Remeliik was replaced in 2020 by the 39.5-metre (130 ft) Guardian-class patrol boat, PSS Remeliik II.

Kedam was commissioned on 13 February 2018. Dignitaries attending included President Thomas Remengesau Jr., Vice President and Minister of Justice Raynold Oilouch and Mitsuyuki Unno Executive Director of the Nippon Foundation.

Kedam is staffed by a crew of 15. The vessel is named after the "Great Frigate Bird of Palau".
