= PSS Remeliik II =

Patrol boat

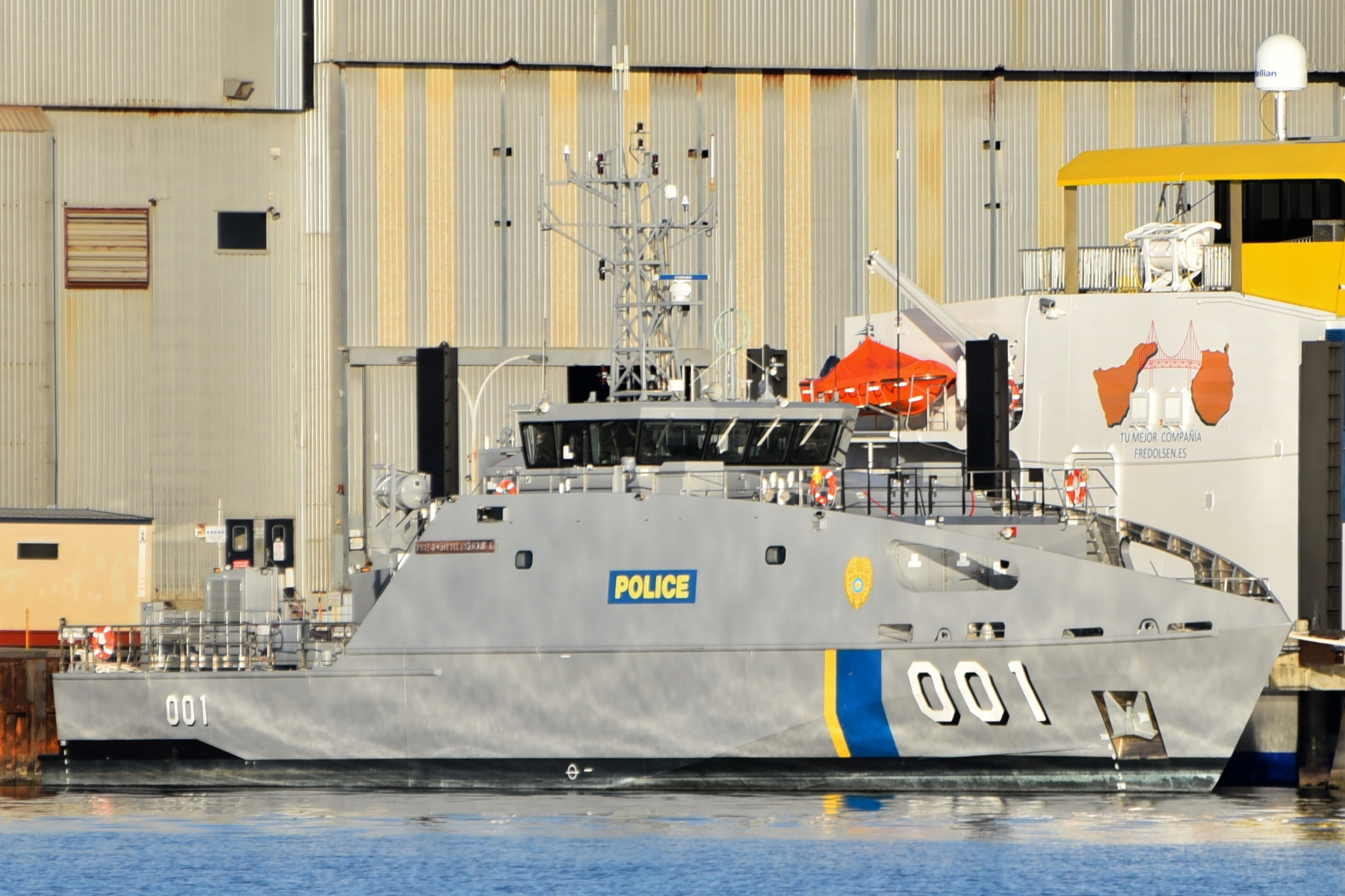
- PSS Remeliik II at Austal shipyards in Henderson, June 2020

History

Palau
- Name: PSS President H.I. Remeliik II
- Namesake: Haruo Remeliik
- Acquired: September 18, 2020
- Commissioned: December 4, 2020
- Identification: IMO number: 4734166; MMSI number: 511000700; Callsign: T8AL
- Status: In service

General characteristics
- Class & type: Guardian-class patrol vessel

PSS Remeliik II is a Guardian-class patrol boat in the service of Palau's Division of Maritime Law Enforcement, built, and provided by Australia to replace the Pacific Forum patrol boat PSS Remeliik. In the late 1980s and early 1990s Australia helped its smaller neighbours, in the Pacific Forum by building small patrol boats so they could protect their own sovereignty. The United Nations Convention on the Law of the Sea (UNCLOS), had extended an exclusive economic zone (EEZ) 200 kilometres (120 mi) off the shores of all maritime nations, and for small Island nations in the Pacific protecting their EEZ would be an overwhelming problem.

The original patrol boats were designed for a lifetime of approximately thirty years, and, prior to reaching this date, Australia designed and started building replacement vessels. The Guardian-class patrol vessels are larger, and more capable than the original vessels. But, like the original Pacific Forum boats, they were designed to use commercial off-the-shelf components, so they would be easier to maintain in small isolated shipyards.

== Delivery ==
Remeliik II was scheduled for delivery in June 2020. Melissa Price, Australian Minister for Defence Industry, handed the vessel over to Paluan officials on September 18, 2020.

The handover was delayed due to the quarantine of the Palauan crew in order prevent the spread of COVID-19.

== Operational career ==
Remeliik II was commissioned on December 4, 2020.

On December 15, 2020, The Guardian reported that the Remeliik II detained a Chinese fishing vessel for illegal fishing. 225 kilograms (496 lb) of sea cucumbers was found on board the fishing vessel. Sea cucumbers can be sold for $800 per kilogram, in Asian markets.

The detention of the vessel raised potential health concerns. At that time, in December 2020, Palau had been one of a very small number of countries that had no confirmed cases of COVID-19. The crew of the Chinese vessel were placed in quarantine. Palauan health officials were concerned that laying charges against the Chinese crew, and trying them would expose Palauans to a high risk of infection.
