= Euatel =

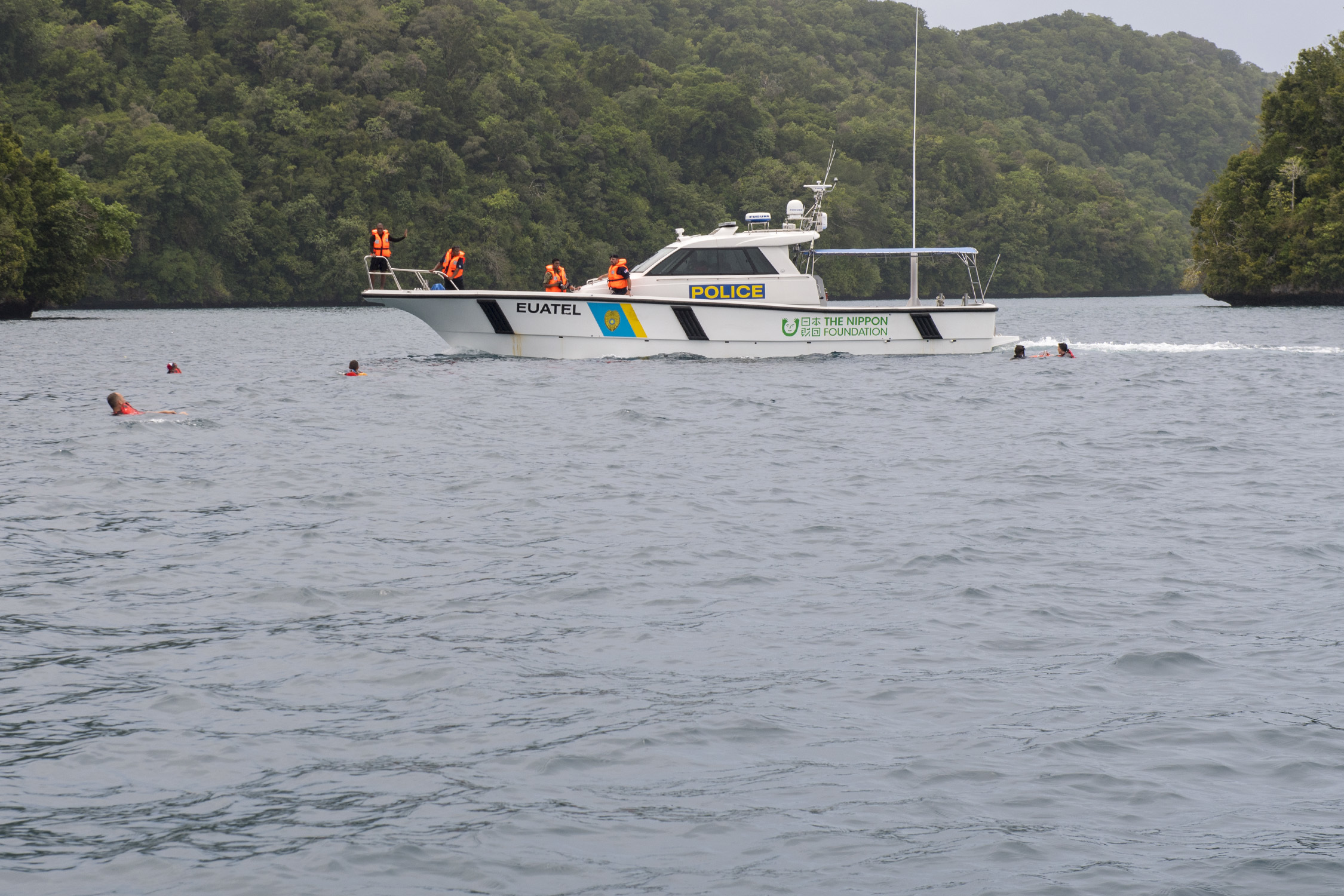

The Euatel is a patrol vessel operated by Palau's Division of Marine Law Enforcement. She was donated to Palau by the Nippon Foundation and Sasakawa Peace Foundation. She is the third vessel of her class to be donated to Palau. She was delivered on April 25, 2017, and her sister ships, Kabekl M’tal and Bul in 2015 and 2012.

Her primary duty will be fishery protection.
