= Pikelot =

Pacific uninhabited island in Yap State, Federated States of Micronesia

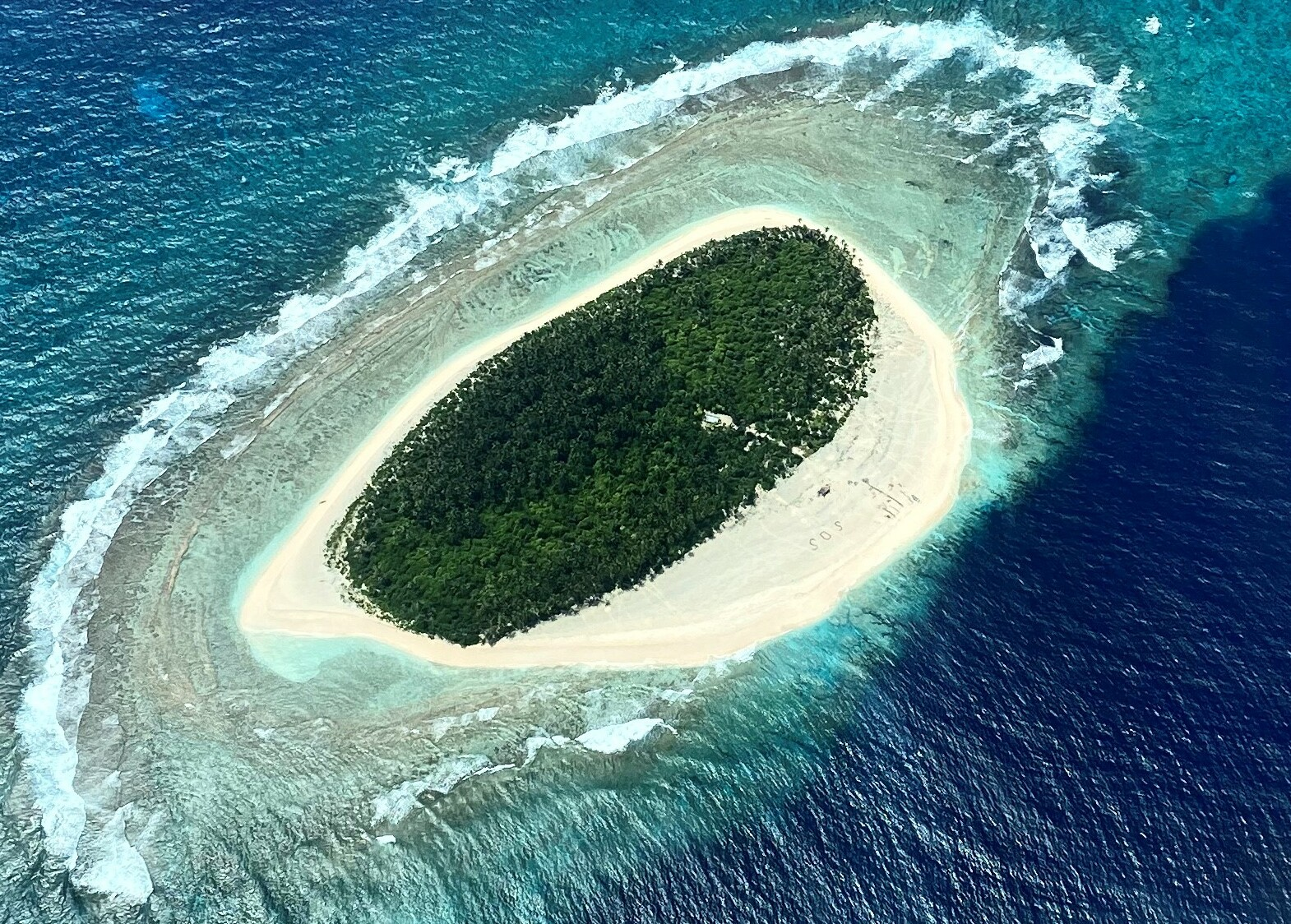
- The island as seen from the air in 2020

- Location within Federated States of Micronesia

Geography
- Coordinates: 8°06′18″N 147°38′47″E
- Area: 0.126 km^{2} (0.049 sq mi)
- Length: 0.45 km (0.28 mi)
- Width: 0.28 km (0.174 mi)
- Highest elevation: 4 m (13 ft)

Administration
- Federated States of Micronesia
- State: Yap

Demographics
- Population: 0

Pikelot Island is one of the outer islands of the State of Yap, part of the Federated States of Micronesia. It is a low coral islet, with a wet, tropical climate. It is uninhabited. Since the 1970s, sailors have stranded on the island on several occasions.

== Flora and fauna ==
The island is known to have a rich ecosystem, with forest and scrub; and extensive fringing reefs. The islet is also home to a major seabird rookery, turtle nesting area and a few mangroves.

== Inhabitants ==
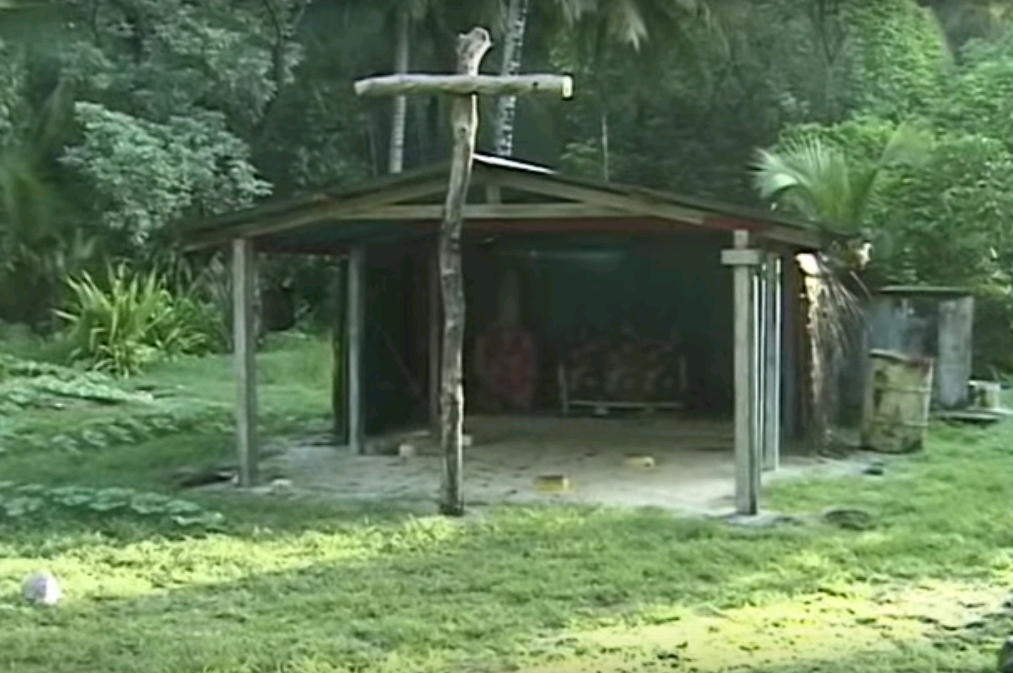
Pikelot Catholic Chapel

The islet has no permanent inhabitants, but because of the beautiful wildlife, there are often temporary visitors from surrounding atolls, such as Puluwat and Satawal, on turtle hunting expeditions. The trip to Pikelot is still carried out in Micronesian-style sailing outrigger canoes.

== History ==
The first recorded European sighting was by Spanish naval officer Juan Antonio de Ibargoitia commanding the vessel Filipino in 1801.

Inhabitants of the western Caroline Islands occasionally take refuge on the island to wait for bad weather to pass, or to make repairs to their vessels.

=== Strandings ===
On September 15, 1975, 9 stranded were found on the island when a Royal New Zealand Air Force crew flying a patrol mission from Naval Air Station Agana, Guam, spotted an "SOS" carved onto one of the island's beaches. Food was dropped to the islanders by plane while MV Cook, a merchant supply vessel, was dispatched to the island from Guam. The stranded reportedly came from the island of Lamotrek, Trust Territory of the Pacific Islands (since 1979 part of the Federated States of Micronesia).

On May 10, 1979, a U.S. Navy P-3 Orion maritime patrol aircraft found a group of between 46 and 50 people on the island when the crew spotted an "SOS" as well as the words "food, water, we need rice" and "three head wounds" carved into the sand. Later communication with the group via radio indicated that some in the group, including children, were ill. MS Micro Trader, a Chuukese commercial ship, was sent to the island with food and medical supplies. A U.S. Navy aircraft dropped water and military rations on the island. The group had reportedly been sheltering on the island due to unfavorable weather conditions. 18 of the group were later picked up by the Micro Trader and taken to the islands of Puluwat and Pulusuk. A group of 28 islanders opted to remain on the island to wait for better weather in order to return to Puluwat by sailboat. None among the group were seriously injured.

On May 16, 1983, a U.S. Navy P-3 Orion flying from spotted the words "SOS No Food Water" in the island's sand. The Navy personnel dropped a container with food and water on the island and, via the military's search and rescue center, contacted the Trust Territory government, which sent a vessel to the island.

On May 14, 1986, a U.S. Navy Reserve P-3 Orion crew spotted an "SOS" and shelters that appeared to have been constructed from a wrecked boat, finding that a group of between five and eight appeared to have stranded on the island. The P-3 crew dropped food and water, with the U.S. Air Force sending a C-130 Hercules from Andersen Air Force Base, Guam, to drop additional supplies. The Joint Rescue Coordination Center in Honolulu coordinated for a ship to pick up the stranded.

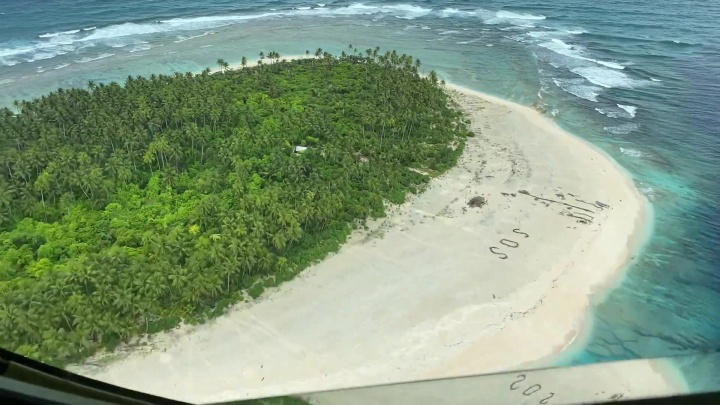
The SOS sign assembled by missing sailors in 2020, seen from the aircraft that found them

On August 2, 2020, three missing sailors were found on the island. After being lost for three days, their SOS sign, assembled with palm branches laid out on the beach, was spotted by a KC-135 Stratotanker aircraft operated by members of the Hawaii and Pennsylvania Air National Guards, who had departed from Andersen Air Force Base, Guam, to search for the missing vessel and its crew. The airmen then radioed their position to an Australian ship in the area. The men were delivered supplies and equipment by an ARH Tiger helicopter from HMAS Canberra as well as a United States Coast Guard HC-130 Hercules from Coast Guard Air Station Barbers Point, Hawaii, and ultimately returned home aboard Micronesian Pacific-class patrol boat FSS Independence.

On April 9, 2024, three mariners were rescued from the island. They had set sail from Poluwat Atoll on March 31, 2024 and did not return. The search for them began on April 6, 2024. A U.S. Navy Boeing P-8A Poseidon maritime surveillance aircraft, dispatched from Kadena Air Base, Japan, spotted a "HELP" sign made of palm fronds on a beach on April 7, 2024. A day later, a U.S. Coast Guard Lockheed HC-130J dropped a radio to the three men. The morning of April 9, the mariners were rescued by U.S. Coast Guard personnel from Sentinel-class cutter USCGC Oliver Henry and were subsequently returned to Poluwat.

== See also ==
- Desert island
- List of islands
