= CIPPB Te Kukupa =

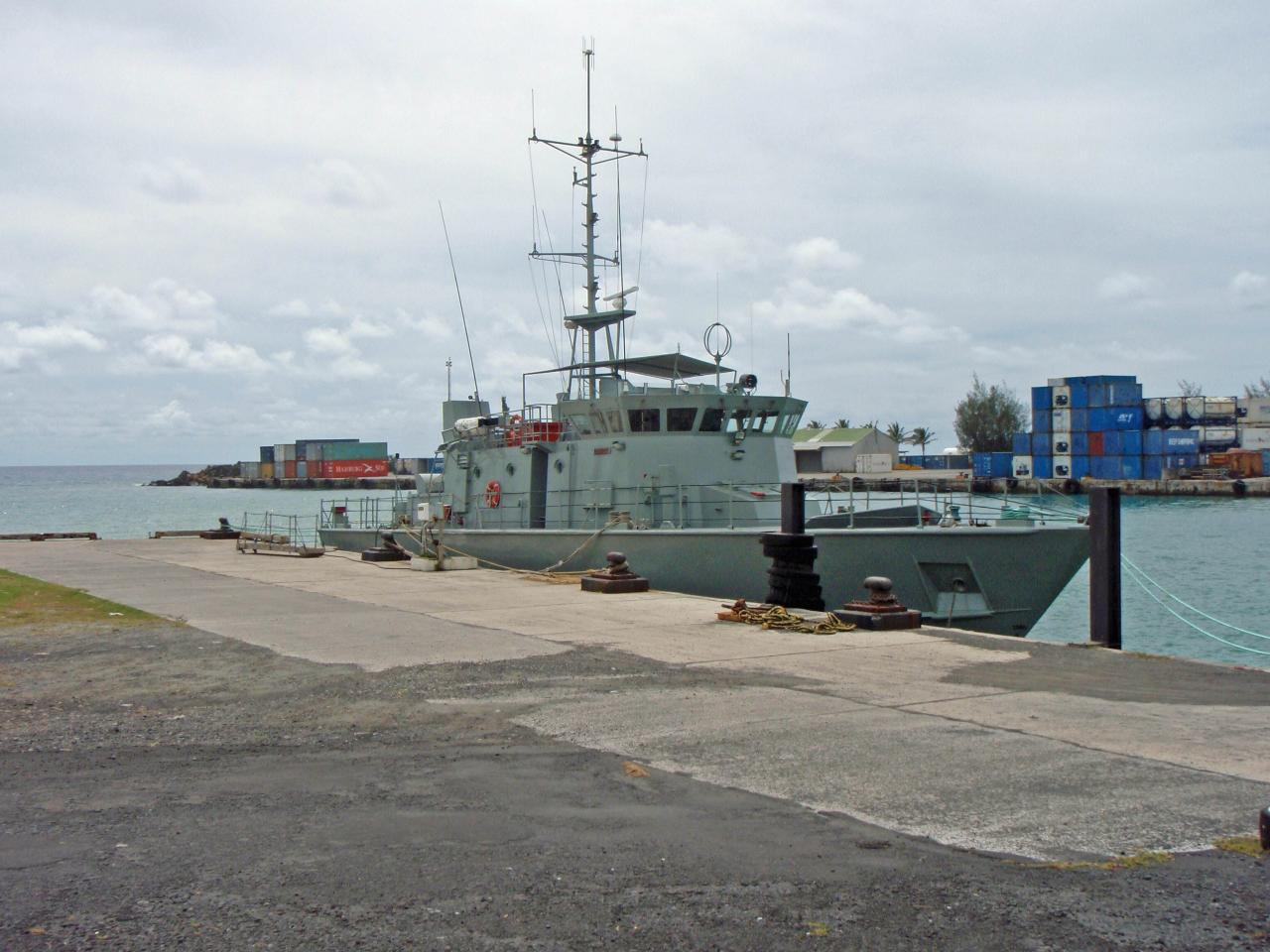
- Te Kukupa in Avatiu harbour

History

Cook Islands
- Name: Te Kukupa
- Owner: Cook Islands Police Force
- Operator: Cook Islands Police Force
- Christened: May 1989
- In service: May 1989
- Out of service: 2022
- Refit: 2015
- Identification: IMO number: 8976293; MMSI number: 518014000; Callsign: E5WJ

General characteristics
- Class & type: Pacific-class patrol boat
- Displacement: 162 tons
- Complement: 15

CIPPB Te Kukupa is a Pacific-class patrol boat, built by Australia and operated by the Cook Islands.

== Background ==
When the United Nations Convention on the Laws of the Seas established that all maritime nations' exclusive economic zones extended 200 kilometres (124 mi) from their shores, Australia designed and built 22 patrol vessels that it then gave to 12 of its neighbours in the Pacific Forum, so they could exercise sovereignty over their zones, from their own resources.

Australia provided just one vessel to the Cook Islands, and will be providing it with a larger and more capable replacement, from the Guardian class. The replacement is scheduled to be delivered in 2022.

== Design ==
Australia designed these vessels using commercial off-the-shelf equipment, rather than high performance military grade equipment to help ease the maintenance burden of maintaining the vessels in small, remote shipyards. Te Kukupa displaces 160 tons, and is designed to allow its crew to remain at sea for missions of up to ten days.

== Operational history ==
Te Kukupa was delivered in 1989. In 1995 it escorted the vaka Te Au o Tonga to Moruroa to protest against French nuclear testing.

In January 2012 Te Kukupa went to the rescue of the yacht Bonny, only to find it empty, with its lone crew-member missing. It later emerged that the yacht had been stolen by a man facing child sex charges. A member of the Cook Islands Police was later convicted of stealing $9,000 from the yacht.

The vessel underwent a major refit in Australia in 2015.

On November 3, 2017, Te Kukupa rescued in rough and heavy the owner of the yacht Zangano, whose engines had failed several days earlier.

== Replacement ==
Australia started building a class of replacements for the original Pacific Forum patrol vessels, in 2017. Te Kukupa's replacement was named CIPPB Te Kukupa II. Te Kukupa left on her final voyage to Australia on 25 February 2022.
