= Titilupe =

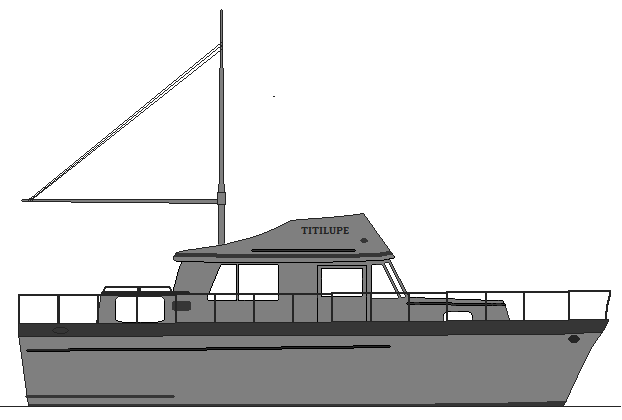

History

Tonga
- Name: Titilupe
- Home port: Touliki Base, Nuku'alofa

General characteristics
- Displacement: 1 short ton (0.91 t)
- Length: 10.4 metres (34 ft 1 in)
- Beam: 3 metres (9 ft 10 in)
- Draught: 1 metre (3 ft 3 in)
- Propulsion: 1 × Ford diesel engine
- Speed: 8 knots (15 km/h; 9.2 mph)
- Complement: 4

Titilupe is a small motor yacht used by the Royal family of Tonga as a royal yacht. It is officially assigned to the Tongan Maritime Force; division of the Tonga Defence Services.

Under Sālote Tupou III, the yacht's earlier predecessor was the 108-ton schooner Hifofua, which was sold in Fiji in the early 1970s after the death of the queen. Following the sale of Hifofua, Sprucebank was used as the royal yacht, for some ten years. In the late 1980s, Tāufaʻāhau Tupou IV bought a new yacht, and in honor of Salote Mafile'o Pilolevu Tuita, it was named Titilupe.

== Design ==
The yacht has a glass-reinforced plastic hull, and glass superstructure, its painted white with blue stripes in the upper parts of the hull and superstructure. It also has a very shallow draught, and is prone to rolling, its therefore only used in coastal waters. Despite its small size, it can carry a crew of up to four, a captain, helmsman, engineer, and steward. It is equipped with a separate two-berth cabin in the bow, as well as a wardroom with a dining area that can be transformed into two extra beds.

== Use ==
The yacht was used by Koen van Exel mainly for fishing, but as his health declined, it was used as an auxiliary patrol craft, and hydrographic ship. After the death of Tāufaʻāhau Tupou IV, the yacht was occasionally used by his son, George Tupou V.
