= USCGC Harriet Lane (WMEC-903) =

US Coast Guard cutter

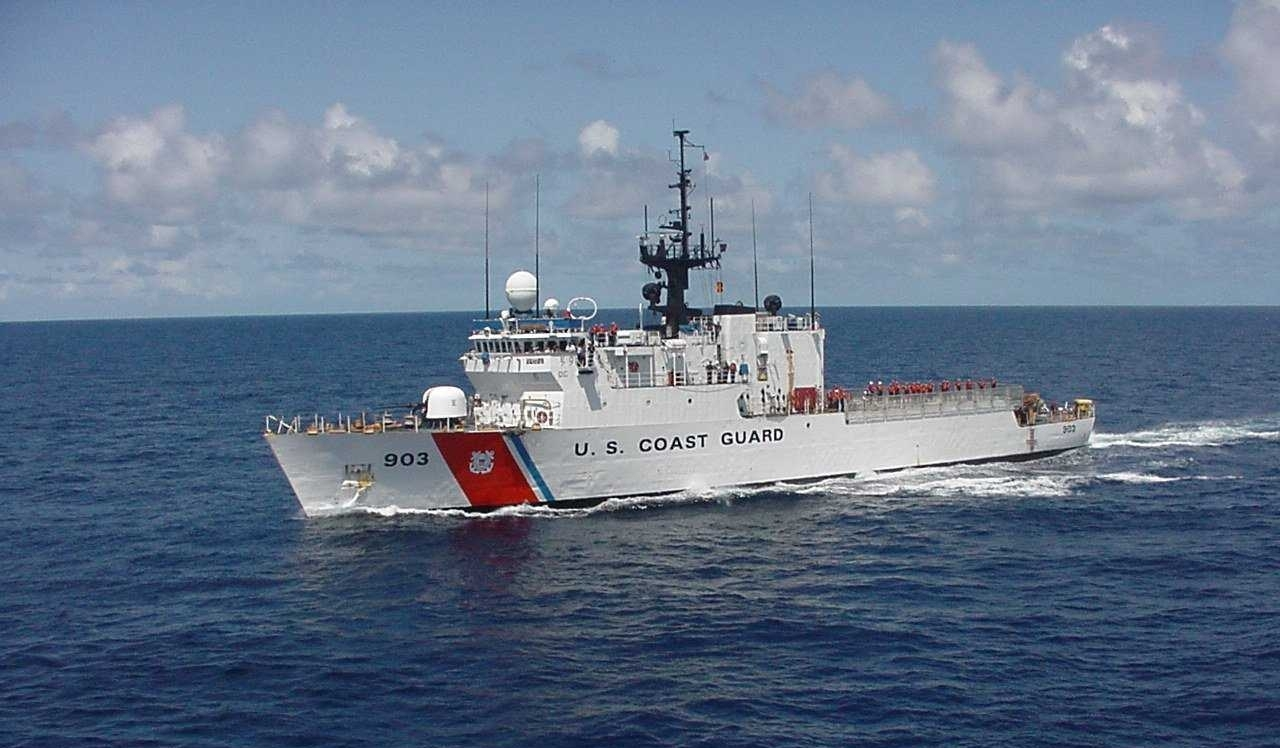
- USCGC Harriet Lane (WMEC-903)

History

United States
- Builder: Tacoma Boatbuilding Company, Tacoma, Washington
- Acquired: April 1984
- Commissioned: 14 June 1984 in Seattle, Washington
- Home port: Honolulu, Hawai'i
- Identification: MMSI number: 367291000; Callsign: NHNC
- Motto: Paratus Volens Valious; Ready, Willing, Able
- Status: Active
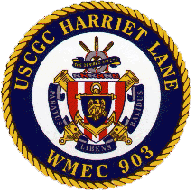
- Badge

General characteristics
- Displacement: 1,800 tons
- Length: 270 ft (82 m)
- Beam: 38 ft (11.6 m)
- Draught: 14.5 ft (4.4 m)
- Propulsion: Twin turbo-charged ALCO V-18 diesel engines
- Speed: 19.5 knots (36.1 km/h; 22.4 mph)
- Range: 9,900 nautical miles (18,300 km; 11,400 mi)
- Boats & landing craft carried: Over the horizon boat; Rigid-hulled inflatable boat
- Complement: 100 personnel (14 officers, 86 enlisted)
- Sensors & processing systems: AN/SPS-73 surface-search radar; MK-92 Fire Control System (Removed in a 2022-2023 SLEP)
- Electronic warfare & decoys: AN/SLQ-32 (receive only)
- Armament: 1 OTO Melara Mk 75 76 mm/62 caliber naval gun (Replaced in a 2022-2023 SLEP with a Mk38 Mod 3 25mm); 2 × .50 caliber (12.7 mm) machine gun
- Aircraft carried: HH-65 Dolphin

USCGC Harriet Lane (WMEC-903) is a United States Coast Guard medium endurance cutter. She is named after the USRC Harriet Lane, the first ship to fire in anger during the American Civil War. Harriet Lane was constructed by Tacoma Boatbuilding, Tacoma, Washington and delivered 20 April 1984.

== History ==
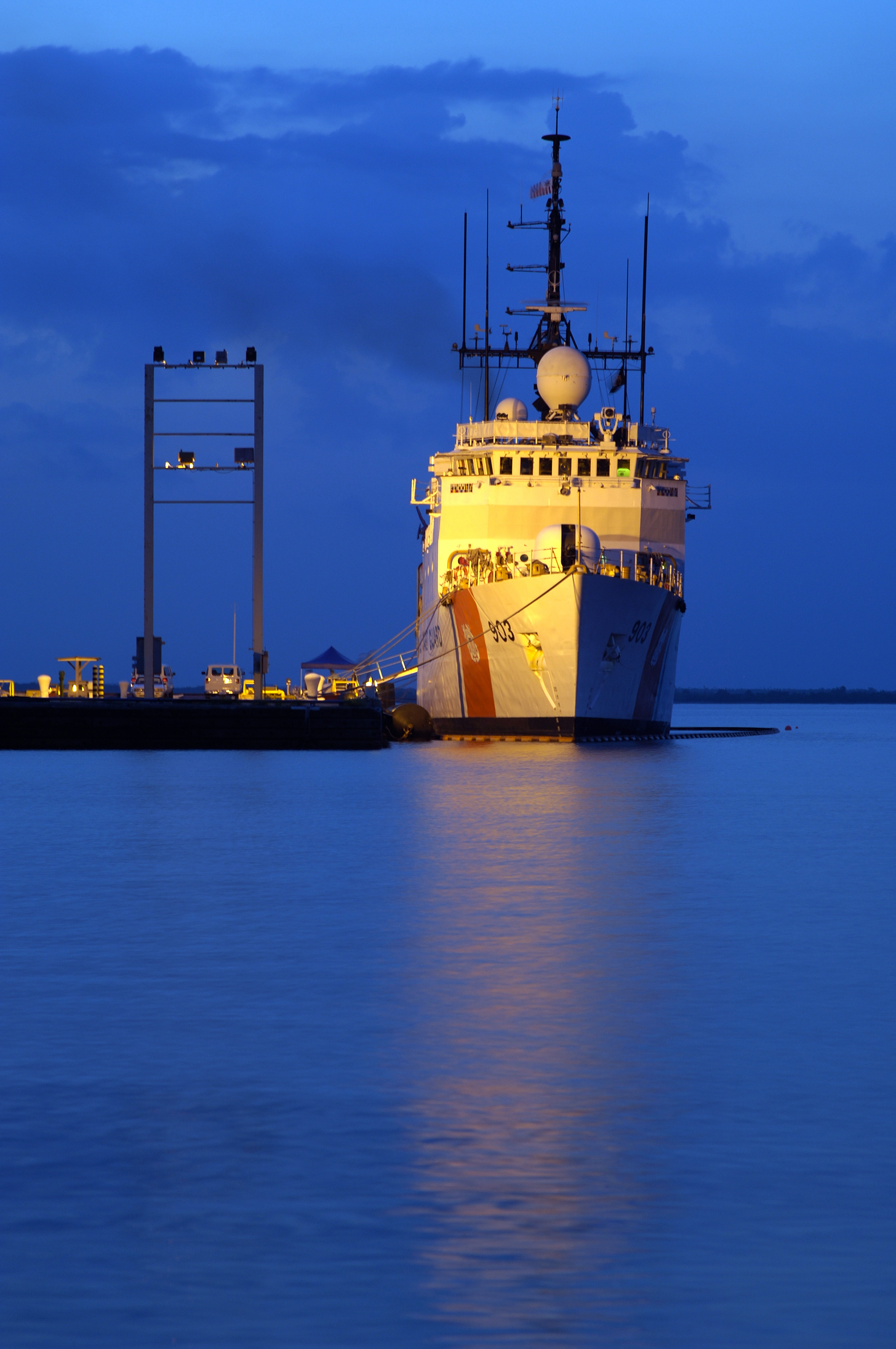
Harriet Lane moored at Guantanamo Bay Naval Base.

Harriet Lane was commissioned on 14 June 1984 and has served the Coast Guard and the nation with distinction, for example, by conducting Coast Guard and national defense missions from Maine to South America and even into the Pacific Northwest. In 1994, as the Commander of Operation Able Manner forces, she directed the rescue of thousands of Haitian and Cuban migrants flowing across the Windward Passage and Florida Straits toward U.S. shores. During this mass migration, Harriet Lane's crew saved over 2,400 migrants, directed 15 cutters, an aerostat and multiple aircraft. She has twice been a key U.S. participant in the annual UNITAS multi-national exercise with South American navies in 1994 and 1997. In 1995, Harriet Lane conducted a trial Alaska patrol to determine the feasibility of placing a medium-endurance cutter in the Seventeenth District.

In 1996, Harriet Lane was the on scene commander for much of the initial search and recovery of TWA Flight 800 off Long Island. She escorted an international fleet of tall ships during the OPSAIL 2000 Parade of Sail. Most recently, exhibiting the Coast Guard's multi-mission nature and typical of Harriet Lane's twenty years of service, she stood as a maritime security sentry in Charleston, South Carolina Harbor for the Operation Iraqi Freedom load-out, then moved south to the Caribbean and seized two tons of cocaine headed for the U.S., and finally, rescued several hundred migrants attempting to reach the U.S. in unseaworthy boats.

In May 2010, Harriet Lane was directly involved in response efforts of the Deepwater Horizon offshore drilling rig in the Gulf of Mexico after the major explosion that sank the rig. This was considered the worst environmental disaster in US history.

== Indo-Pacific Support Cutter ==
In March 2023, the U.S. Coast Guard announced that Harriet Lane will be transferred to the Indo-Pacific in late 2023 as an 'Indo-Pacific Support Cutter'. Harriet Lane completed a 15 month, $21 million Service Life Extension Program at the Coast Guard Yard in Baltimore on 3 August 2023. Among other work, a 25mm Mk 38 Mod 3 gun was installed. In mid-December 2023, Harriet Lane arrived in her new home port of Honolulu, Hawai'i to begin work as part of U.S. Coast Guard District 14.

In June 2024, she embarked on a 68-day mission covering 13,400 nautical miles, visiting and training with government partners in Tuvalu, Tonga, Samoa and the Cook Islands, including participating in an international fleet review in honor of Tongan King Tupou VI's 65th Birthday and the 50th anniversary of the Royal Tongan Navy. She joined 11 ships from 10 countries in Nuku’alofa including Australia's HMAS Choules, China’s PLA-N Zibo, Japan’s JS Noshiro, New Zealand’s HMNZS Manawanui, and the UK's HMS Tamar, with Tonga's VOEA Ngahau Koula serving as the King's flagship.

== Notable commanders ==
- Paul F. Zukunft, Admiral, U.S. Coast Guard

== See also ==
- USRC Harriet Lane (1857) - Original cutter named Harriet Lane
