= VOEA Lomipeau =

Coastal tanker

General characteristics
- Type: Tanker
- Displacement: 4,000 tonnes full load
- Length: 83.5 m (273 ft 11 in)
- Beam: 13.5 m (44 ft 3 in)
- Propulsion: 2 diesels
- Speed: 12.5 knots (23.2 km/h; 14.4 mph)

VOEA Lomipeau (A301) (ex Punaruu, ex Bow Cecil) is a coastal tanker with the Tonga Maritime Force that entered service in 1995. The ship was built in 1969 in Norway and commissioned into the French Navy as Punaruu on 16 November 1971. It was gifted to Tonga in 1995 as a reward for not speaking out against French nuclear testing. It was subsequently given a major refit in Auckland, New Zealand, then used to carry relief fuel to the Cook Islands, and water to Haʻapai.

Its home port was Nukuʻalofa.
