= FSS Independence =

Pacific-class patrol boat

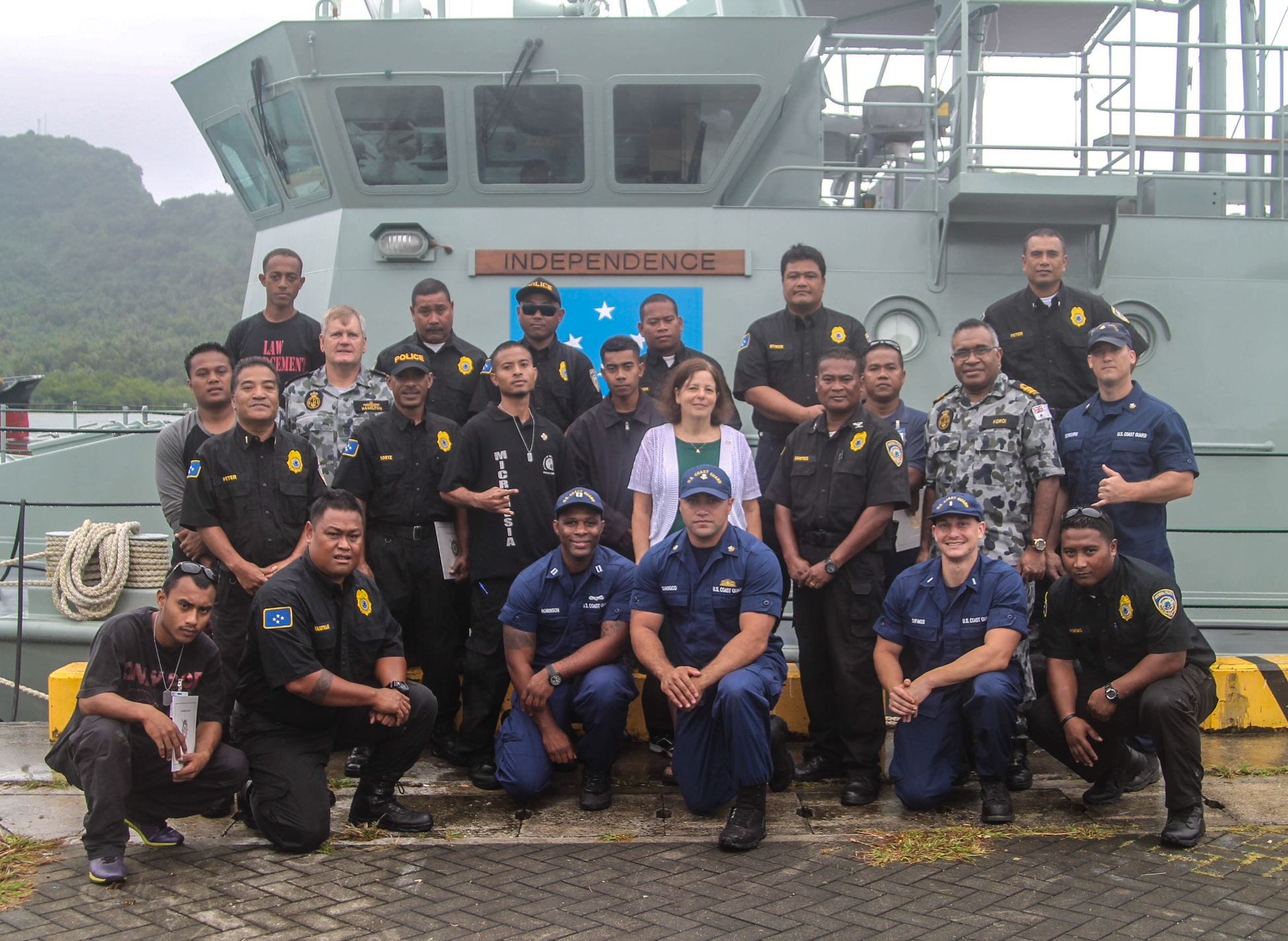
- FSS Independence, shown here with crew and US Ambassador to Micronesia

History

Federated States of Micronesia
- Name: Independence
- Acquired: March 1990
- Decommissioned: 12 January 2022
- Status: decommissioned

General characteristics
- Class & type: Pacific-class patrol boat

FSS Independence is a Pacific-class patrol boat manufactured by Australia and delivered to the Federated States of Micronesia under the Pacific Patrol Boat Program. It was superseded in January 2022 by Guardian-class patrol boats under the Pacific Maritime Security Program.

== Overview ==
Independence was transferred to Micronesia in March 1990. As a Pacific-class patrol boat, it had a length of 31.5 metres (103 ft 4 in), a beam of 8.1 metres (26 ft 7 in), a draught of 1.8 metres (5 ft 11 in), and a full load displacement of 162 tonnes (159 long tons). It was decommissioned and returned to Australia on 12 January 2022 in exchange for the new Guardian-class patrol boats that Micronesia would receive. At the decommissioning ceremony, the president of Micronesia stated that the patrol boat along with its sister ship FSS Micronesia provided "the sovereign capability to conduct maritime surveillance and enforcement, as well as to assist our Nation with important missions ranging from Search & Rescue operations to disaster relief".

== Service ==
In its 30 years of service from 1990 to 2022, the two patrol boats have seen service in a large variety of fields, including mitigating illegal, unreported and unregulated (IUU) fishing activities. In addition, it has also participated in maritime rescue operations; for example, in August 2020 it cooperated with Australian and American forces to conduct a rescue of three people stranded on the deserted island of Pikelot.

In June 2010, the patrol boat had to be temporarily suspended from service for emergency repairs due to extensive corrosion. A total fund of $78,000 was allocated for the repairs, as any lapse in the patrolling capability was deemed to be crippling to government services.

As with other PPBP recipients, due to cost issues the use of the patrol boat gradually decreased. The patrol boat, along with its sisters FSS Palikir and FSS Micronesia, consumed a total of 33% of Micronesia's operations budget in 1999. During the 2006–2012 period, median total days at sea decreased to 69 days, i.e. 11.5 days per year.
