= Mango (Tonga) =

Island in Tonga

Coordinates: 20.329°S 174.709°W

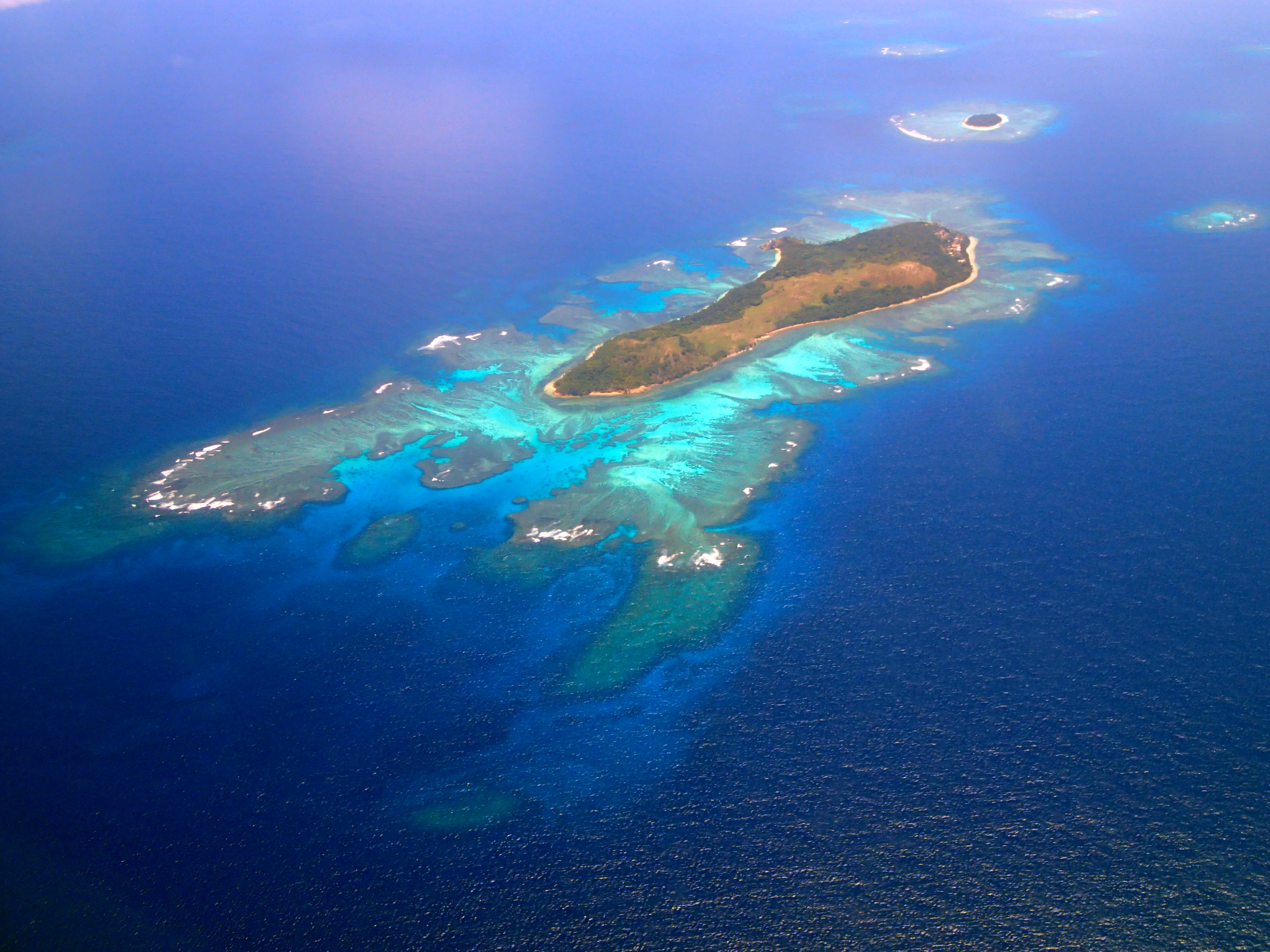
- Mango island from its northeastern side with nearby islets, 2013
- Interactive map of Mango

Geography
- Location: Pacific Ocean

Administration
- Tonga

Demographics
- Population: 36 (2021)

Mango is a small island in Tonga, 9 kilometres south-east of the larger island of Nomuka, and part of the Nomuka or ʻOtu Muʻomuʻa group of islands, which are the southern part of the Haʻapai group. Mango had a population of 36 in the 2021 census.

== History ==
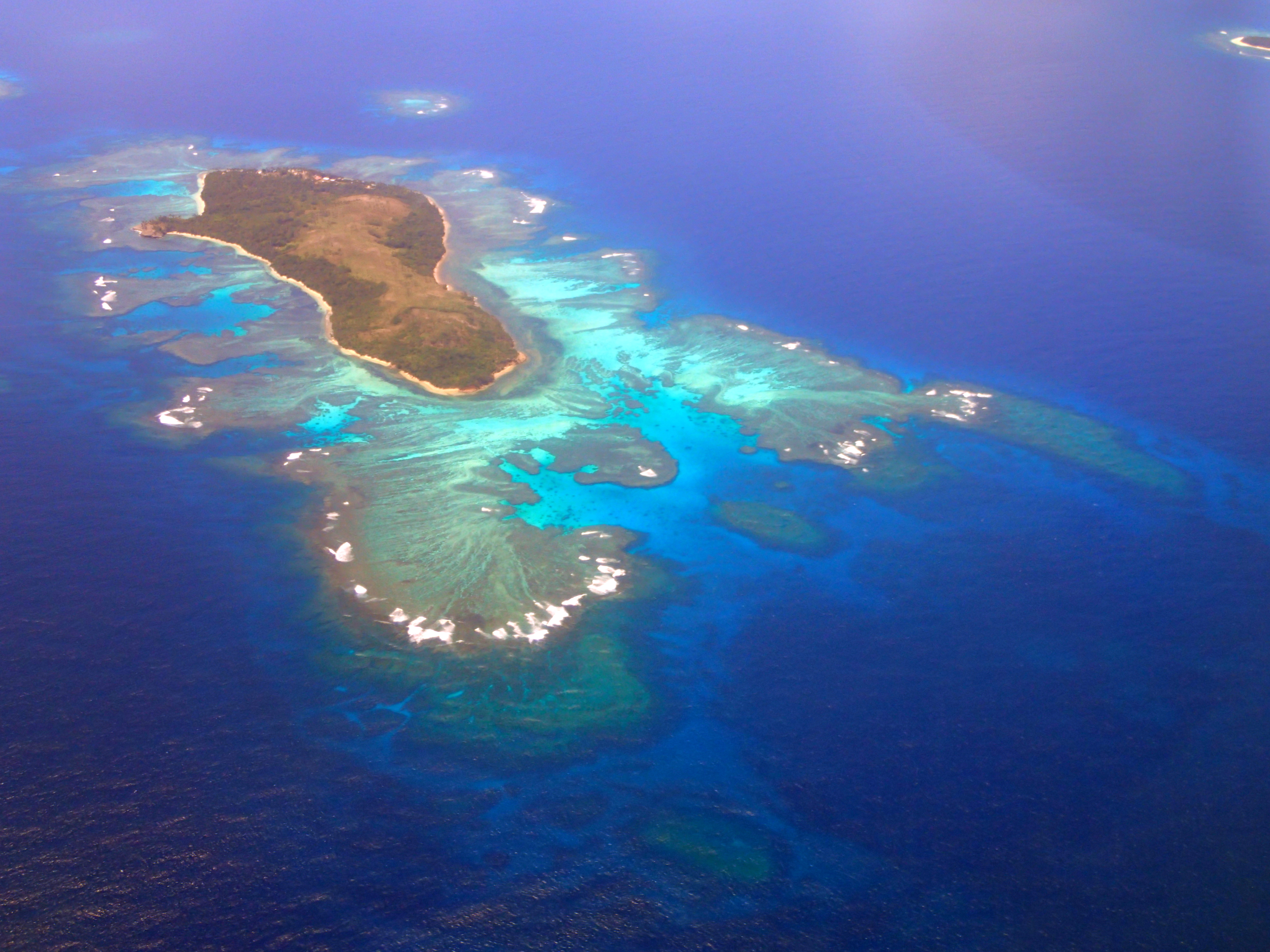
Mango island from its southeastern side, 2013

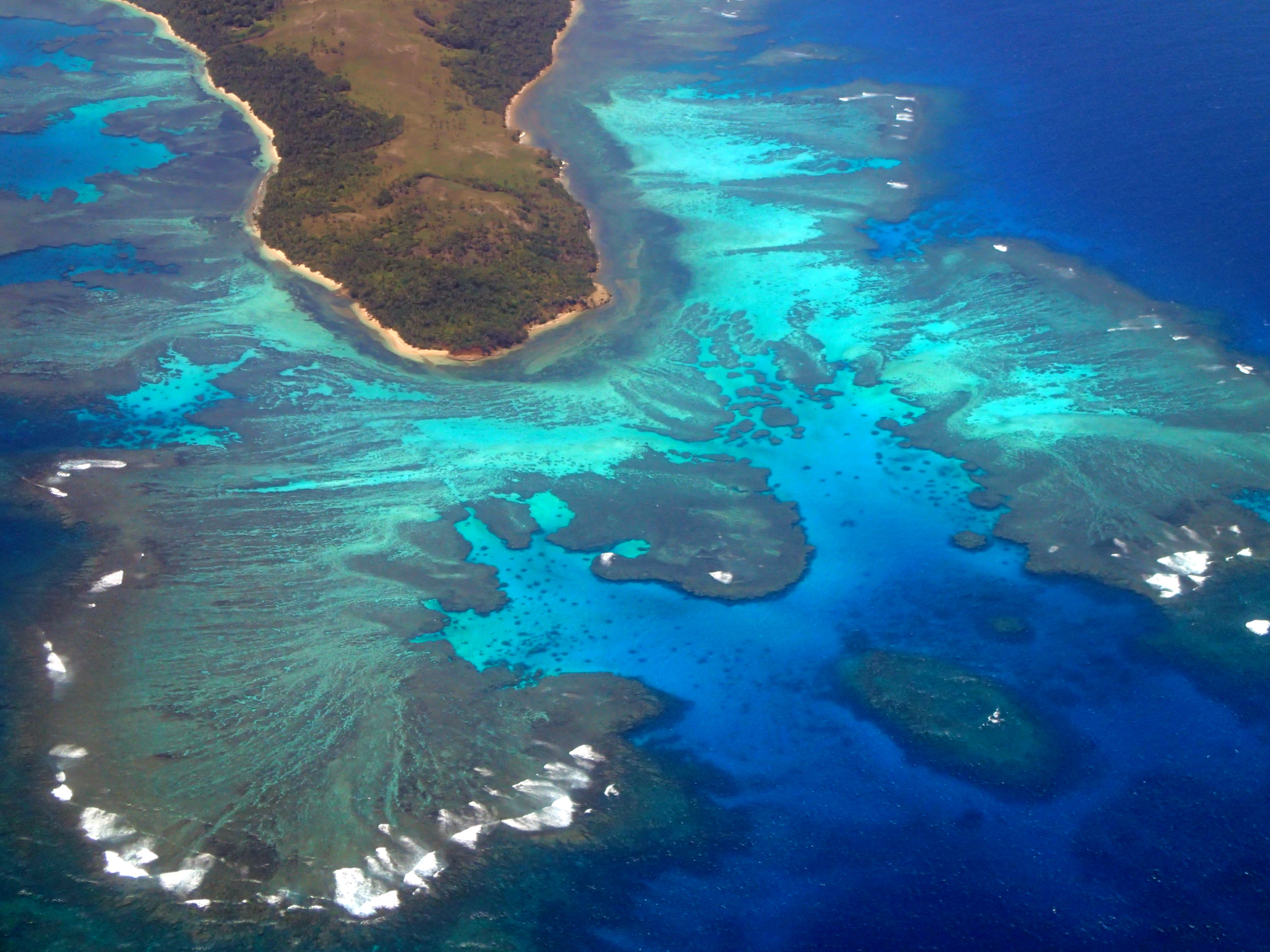
Southeastern tip of Mango island, 2013

The island was badly damaged by the 2022 Hunga Tonga–Hunga Ha'apai eruption and tsunami. Following the eruption, a distress call was detected from the island. Images from the New Zealand Defence Force showed that it had suffered "catastrophic" damage, with an entire village destroyed. According to the Tongan government, all homes on the island were destroyed, and a 65-year-old man was killed. After the eruption, the entire island was evacuated, and the inhabitants were brought to Tongatapu by the Tongan Maritime Force. After living at a church hall in Nuku'alofa for almost a year, they were eventually resettled on ʻEua.
