= PSS Remeliik =

Pacific Forum-class patrol boat

History

Palau
- Name: PSS President H.I. Remeliik
- Namesake: Haruo Remeliik
- Builder: Australian Shipbuilding Industries
- Acquired: May 1996
- Decommissioned: March 13, 2020
- Status: retired

General characteristics
- Class & type: Pacific-class patrol boat
- Displacement: 162 tonnes full load
- Length: 31.5 m (103 ft 4 in)
- Beam: 8.1 m (26 ft 7 in)
- Draught: 1.8 m (5 ft 11 in)
- Propulsion: 2 Caterpillar 3516TA diesel engines, 2,100 kW (2,820 hp), 2 shafts
- Speed: 20 knots (37 km/h; 23 mph)
- Range: 2,500 nmi (4,600 km; 2,900 mi) at 12 knots (22 km/h; 14 mph)
- Endurance: 10 days

PSS Remeliik is a Pacific Forum-class patrol boat, designed and built in Australia, and donated to Palau, to help the nation patrol its exclusive economic zone.

In 1982, the United Nations Convention on the Law of the Sea increased all nations' exclusive economic zones (EEZs) to 200 kilometres (120 mi). After the agreement Pacific Forum meetings triggered Australia to design a class of small patrol boats to give to twelve small nations, including Palau, that were suddenly dwarfed by their EEZs.

Remeliik was designed for a lifetime of 20 years, and Australia was scheduled to replace it with a Guardian-class patrol boat in 2019. Remeliik II was handed over in September 2020.

== Operational history ==
In February 2016 The New York Times Magazine published an account of Remeliik's pursuit and boarding of Shin Jyi Chyuu, what the article called a "Taiwanese pirate ship." In December Remeliik seized a vessel authorities described as the mother ship for a squadron of smaller poaching vessels. They found the mother ship using an "aggregation device" and holding 30 tons of illicitly caught fish in her holds. The mother ship had no fishing license, and had kept no catch log.

In March 2018 Remeliik intercepted a Filipino fishing vessel engaged in poaching. Normally poachers are set free after confiscating their catch, but, in this case, the fishing vessel suffered engine failure, and the poachers crew had to be rescued.

== Retirement ==
The vessel's retired ceremony was held on March 13, 2020 at the Melusch Melachel, Malakal Island.

Remeliik was scheduled to be replaced by the larger and more capable Remeliik II in June 2020. Remeliik II was handed over in September 2020, after delays due to COVID-19.

== See also ==
- PSS Kedam
