= VOEA Late (A402) =

Landing craft operated by the Tongan Maritime Force

History

Tonga
- Name: Late
- Ordered: 1 October 2024
- Commissioned: 15 October 2025
- Identification: Pennant number: A402

General characteristics
- Class & type: ICO13056 landing craft
- Length: 30 m (98 ft 5 in)
- Beam: 8 m (26 ft 3 in)
- Draft: 1.3 m (4 ft 3 in)
- Propulsion: 2 × Caterpillar C12 diesel engines, 339 kW (455 hp)
- Speed: 8 knots (15 km/h; 9.2 mph)

VOEA Late (A402) is a landing craft that was commissioned into the Tongan Maritime Force on 15 Oct 2025 and was donated by Australia under the Pacific Maritime Security Program.

A402, replaced, VOEA Late (A401), a landing craft donated by Australia through the Defence Cooperation Program that was commissioned as VOEA Late on 23 October 2015. The A$5 million landing craft was designed by Australian firm Incat Crowther and built by Forgacs Marine and Defence in Newcastle, New South Wales.

A401 was listed in August 2025 for sale by Pickles Auctions.

A401 replaced, HMAV Late (C315), a former Australian Army LCM-8 landing craft donated to Tonga in 1982 through the Australian Defence Cooperation Program to "assist in cyclone rehabilitation work" following Cyclone Isaac. In June 1982, the landing craft was commissioned as the HMAV Late. In 2000, HMAV Late was decommissioned.
