= VOEA Savea =

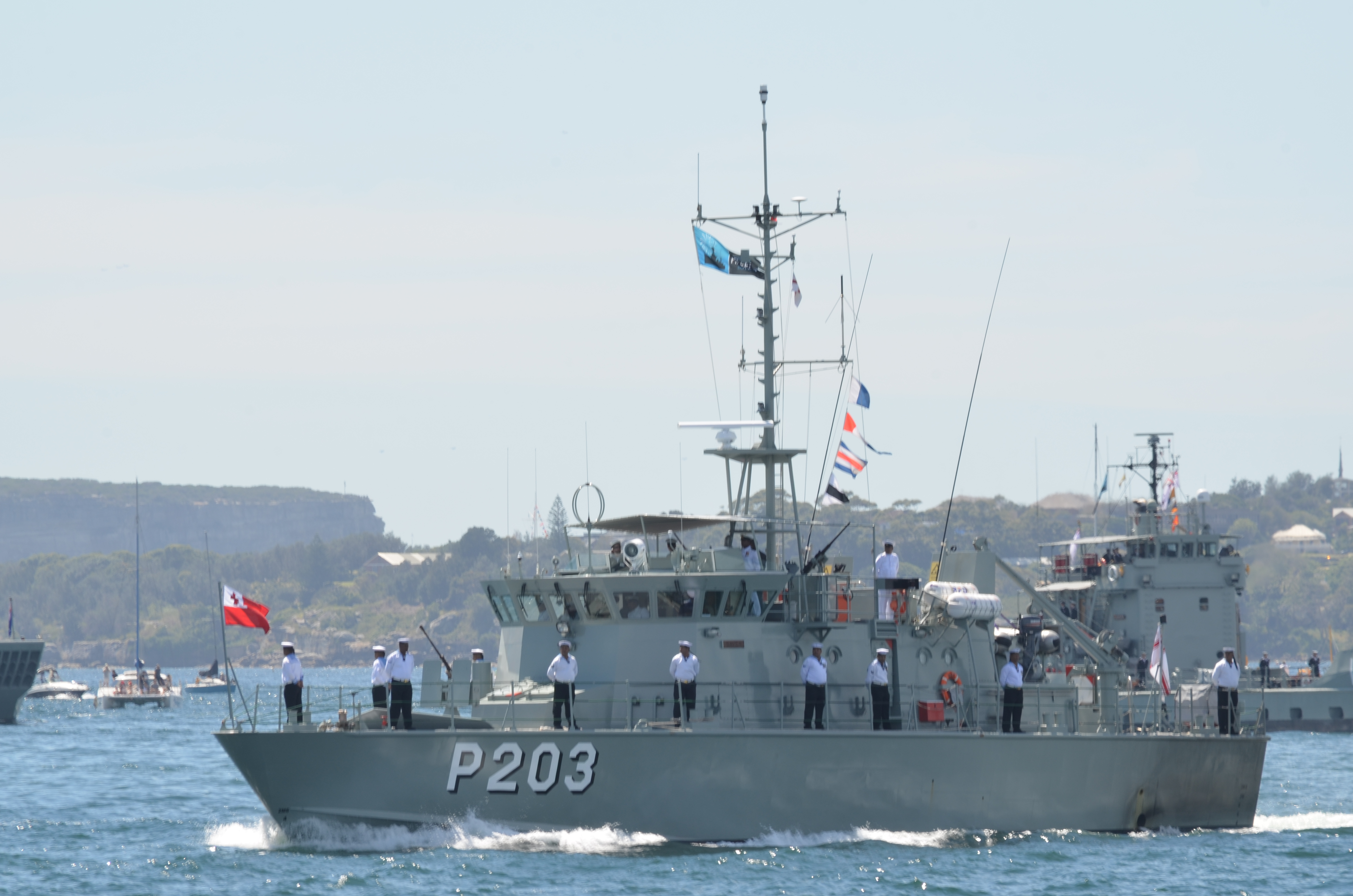
- VOEA Savea

General characteristics
- Displacement: 162 ton
- Length: 31.5 m (103 ft 4 in)

VOEA Savea (P203) was a Pacific Forum patrol vessel operated by the Tongan Maritime Force from 1989 to April 2019.

Savea was replaced in June 2019 by VOEA Ngahau Koula, which was designed and built for the Tonga Maritime Force by Australia.

== Background ==
When the United Nations Convention on the Law of the Sea extended maritime nations' exclusive economic zone (EEZ) to 200 kilometres (120 mi), Australia designed and built 22 patrol vessels for 12 of its fellow members of the Pacific Forum. Australia provided the patrol vessel free of charge, and helped build port facilities and provide training. This allowed its neighbour to exercise sovereignty over their EEZ, intercept smugglers, and poaching fishers, and provide emergency services.

Australia replaced Savea and her two sister ships with two slightly larger and more capable vessels between 2019 and 2020.

== Design ==
The 31.5-metre (103 ft 4 in) vessels displace 162 tonnes, and are built using commercial off-the-shelf (COTS) equipment, instead of more expensive, high-performance, military-grade equipment, to ease the maintenance burden, since local maintenance will be performed in small, isolated shipyards.

== Operational history ==
In 1999 Savea carried scientists from the Ministry of Land, Survey, and Natural Resources to study a volcano that emerged from the ocean in early January 1999. A newly emerged volcanic island was observed from the air on January 8, 1999 35 kilometres (22 mi) northwest of Tongatapu Island. When first observed the island was approximately 300 metres (980 ft) long, with a 100 metres (330 ft) cinder cone. The cone was visibly venting fumes. By the time Savea arrived the island had been washed away, but fumes were still venting from underwater vents.

On August 24, 2009, Savea was dispatched to rescue Santana, a yacht in distress. She was proceeding with her captain and a single crew member. That crew member reported the captain fell overboard, and he did not know how to operate the vessel. In 2009, after 20 years of service, Savea returned to Australia for a major refit. She underwent another refit in Australia, in October 2017.
