= VOEA Ngahau Koula (P101) =

First ship of the Tongan Maritime Force

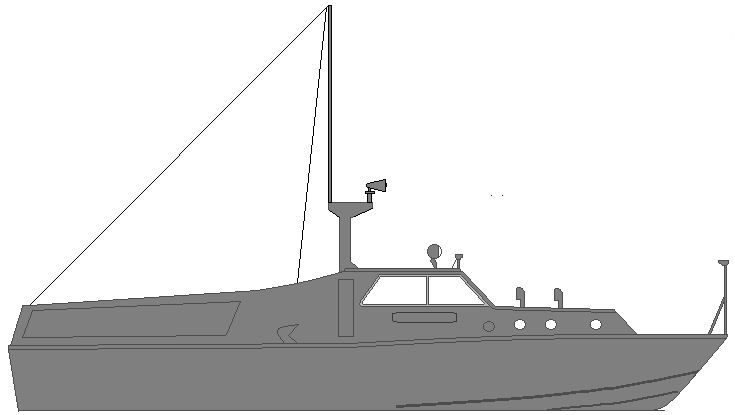
- Ngahau Siliva, the sister ship to Ngahau Koula

History

Tonga
- Name: Ngahau Koula
- Builder: Brooke Marine, Lowestoft
- Commissioned: 10 March 1973

General characteristics
- Class & type: Virgin Clipper-class patrol boat
- Displacement: 15 short tons (14 t)
- Length: 13.7 m (44 ft 11 in)
- Beam: 4 m (13 ft 1 in)
- Draught: 1.2 m (3 ft 11 in)
- Propulsion: 2 × Cummings V8 diesel engines
- Speed: 21 knots (39 km/h; 24 mph)
- Range: 800 miles (1,300 km)
- Complement: 7 (1 officer)
- Sensors & processing systems: Decca 101, Ferrograph
- Armament: 2 × M2 Browning guns

VOEA Ngahau Koula (P101) was the first ship of the Tongan Maritime Force. It was built in the United Kingdom, at Brooke Marine in Lowestoft, and was commissioned on 10 March 1973. The ship was one of several of the same aluminum-hulled class, which were used in ex-British colonies after they were granted independence. It was joined in 1976 by a sister ship, Ngahau Siliva, which incorporated several improvements to the design, most notably an increase in their range from 800 to 1000 miles.

In 1974, Ngahau Koula recorded Lt. Lupeti Vi as commanding officer.
