= VOEA Neiafu =

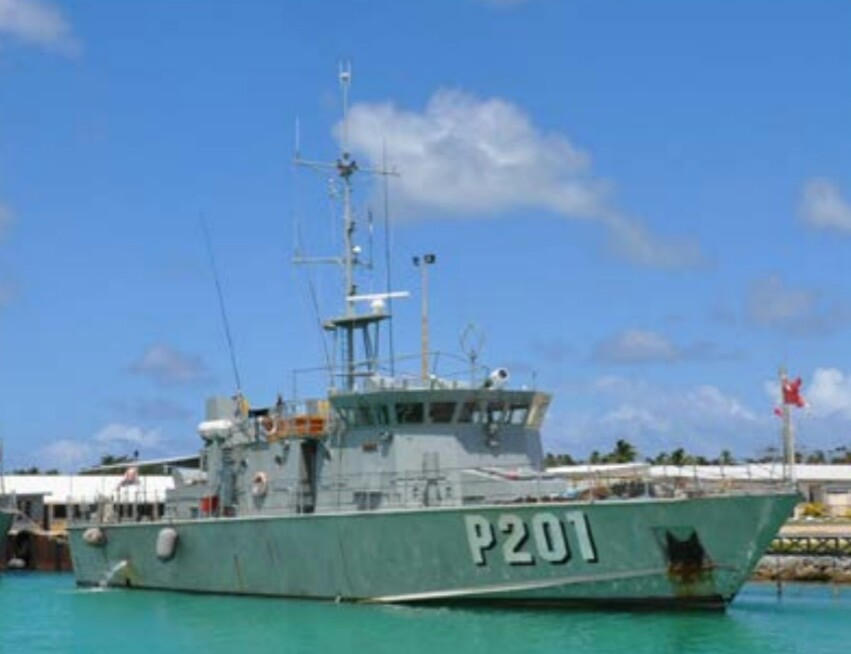
- VOEA Neiafu in 2016

History

Tonga
- Name: Neiafu
- Launched: 1989
- Decommissioned: 2020
- Identification: MMSI number: 570210000; Callsign: A3CB
- Status: Decommissioned

General characteristics
- Class & type: Pacific Forum-class patrol boat
- Displacement: 162 tons
- Length: 103 ft (31 m)

VOEA Neiafu (P201) was a Pacific Forum patrol vessel operated by Tonga from 1989 until its decommissioning in 2020.

== Background ==
When the United Nations Convention on the Law of the Sea extended maritime nations' exclusive economic zone (EEZ) to 200 kilometres (110 nmi), Australia designed and built 22 patrol vessels for 12 of its fellow members of the Pacific Forum. Australia provided the patrol vessels free of charge, and helped build port facilities and provide training. This allowed its neighbours to exercise sovereignty over their EEZ, intercept smugglers, poaching fishers, and provide emergency services.

Australia will replace Neiafu and her two sister ships with two slightly larger and more capable vessels between 2019 and 2020.

== Design ==
The 31.5-metre (103 ft) vessels displace 162 tonnes, and are built using commercial off-the-shelf (COTS) equipment, instead of more expensive, high-performance, military-grade equipment, to ease the maintenance burden, since local maintenance will be performed in small, isolated shipyards.

== Operational history ==
In 2009, after 20 years of service, Neiafu returned to Australia for a major refit.

In 2015 Neiafu traveled to Vanuatu to provide aid following a typhoon.

In 2016 Neiafu participated in a joint exercise with vessels of other nations.

Neiafu completed another Australian refit in 2017.
