= Pacific-class patrol boat =

Australian ship class

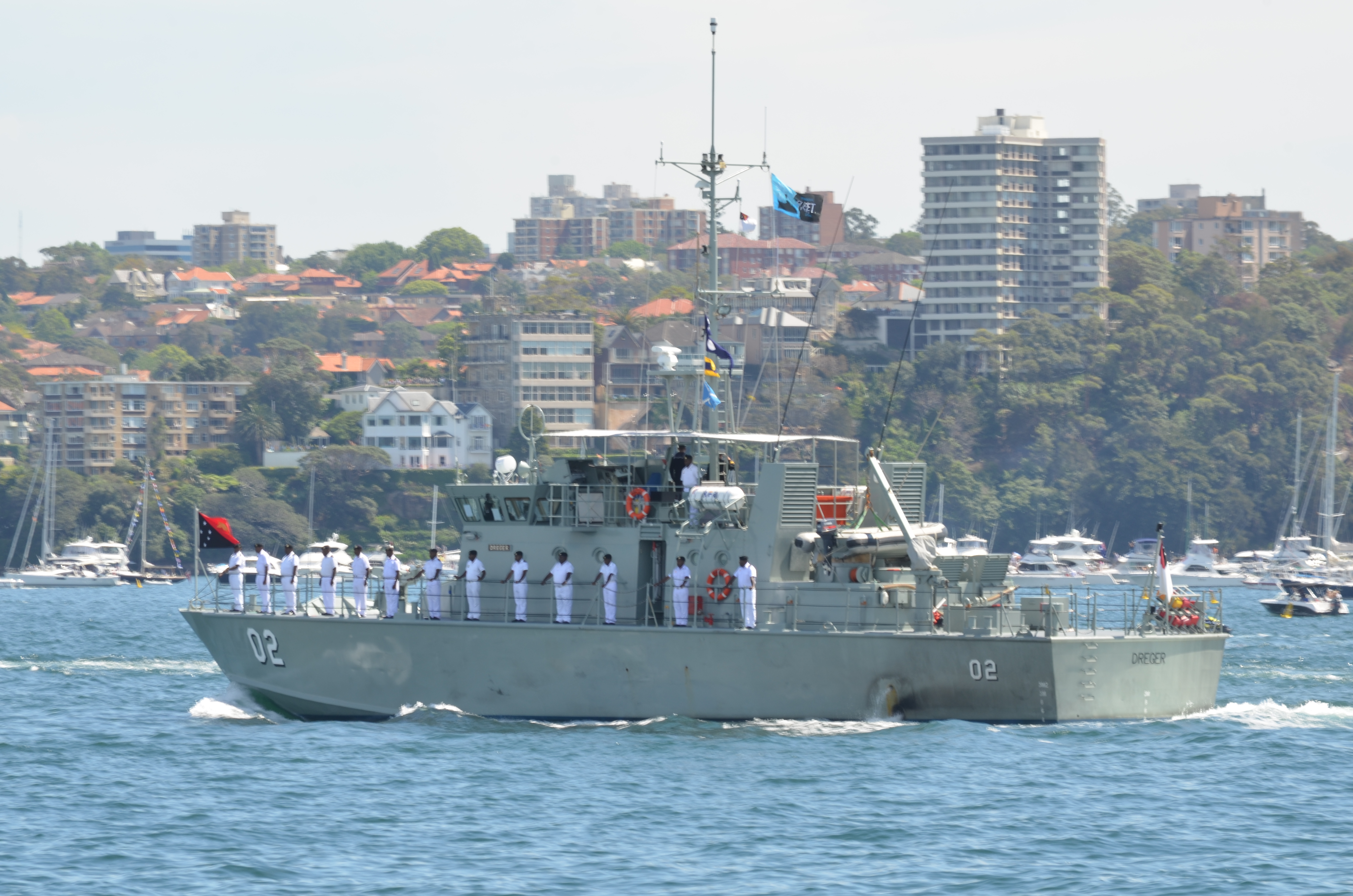
- HMPNGS Dreger entering Sydney Harbour in October 2013

Class overview
- Name: Pacific class
- Builders: Australian Shipbuilding Industries
- Operators: 12 nations, see operators
- Succeeded by: Guardian class
- Subclasses: See Derivatives
- Built: September 1985–June 1997
- In commission: 16 May 1987–present
- Completed: 22
- Active: 21
- Lost: 1

General characteristics
- Type: Patrol boat
- Displacement: 162 tonnes full load
- Length: 31.5 m (103 ft 4 in)
- Beam: 8.1 m (26 ft 7 in)
- Draught: 1.8 m (5 ft 11 in)
- Propulsion: 2 Caterpillar 3516TA diesels, 2,820 hp (2,100 kW), 2 shafts
- Speed: 20 knots (37 km/h; 23 mph)
- Range: 2,500 nmi (4,600 km; 2,900 mi) at 12 knots (22 km/h; 14 mph)
- Endurance: 10 days
- Complement: 14–18
- Sensors & processing systems: Furuno 1011 surface search radar; I band
- Armament: Various small arms, depending on operating country. May include Oerlikon 20 mm cannon, 7.62 mm machine guns, and/or 12.7 mm machine gun. Not all ships are permanently armed.
- Notes: Taken from:

The Pacific class (also known as the Pacific Forum class and the ASI 315 class) is a class of 22 patrol boats built by Australia and donated to twelve South Pacific countries. The vessels were constructed between 1985 and 1997 and are operated by the militaries, coast guards or police forces of the twelve island nations. These boats are supported by the Pacific Patrol Boat Program and used primarily for maritime surveillance and fisheries protection.

== Design and construction ==
The United Nations Convention on the Law of the Sea took effect in 1982. It introduced a 200-nautical-mile (370 km; 230 mi) exclusive economic zone (EEZ) to the territories of all nations with an ocean coastline. Several Southwest Pacific island nations found themselves responsible for policing an area of ocean that was beyond their maritime capability, and often significantly larger than their land territories (at its most extreme, the EEZ of Tuvalu dwarfs its landmass by a ratio of almost 1:28,000). Following requests by several Pacific nations for assistance from the governments of Australia and New Zealand, the Australian government created a Defence Cooperation Project named the Pacific Patrol Boat Program to design and provide suitable patrol boats to nearby island nations. The program also provided training and infrastructure to support these ships. The Program was officially announced by Australian Prime Minister Bob Hawke during the South Pacific Forum meeting held in Canberra on 29 and 30 August 1983.

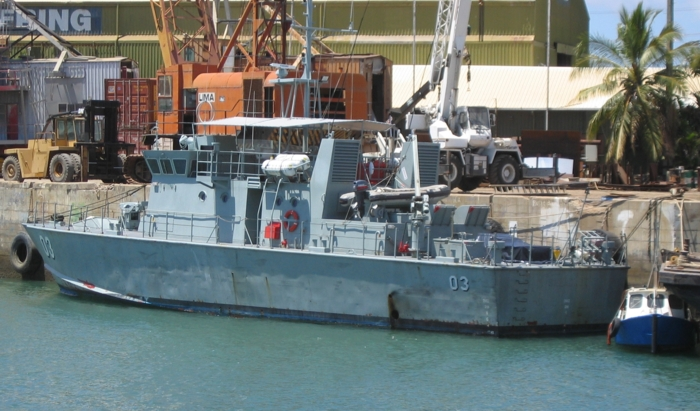
The Papua New Guinea Defence Force patrol boat HMPNGS Seeadler, alongside in Townsville during 2004

Requests for tenders were issued in August 1984. Australian Shipbuilding Industries (ASI) designed a small vessel capable of maritime surveillance and interdiction, search and rescue operations, and fisheries protection. A smaller prototype was constructed by ASI in 1984. The prototype was later sold to the Royal Solomon Islands Police Force and named Savo. The contract for the Pacific class was awarded to ASI on 9 May 1985 and construction began in September 1985. Initially ten ships were planned to be produced for eight countries, with the first ship, HMPNGS Tarangau, delivered to the Papua New Guinea Defence Force on 16 May 1987. The program continued until 15 ships were ordered, then was terminated before being reopened in February 1993. By the time the program concluded, 22 ships had been delivered to 12 countries, with the final ship, FSS Independence, delivered to the Federated States of Micronesia in June 1997. The Pacific Patrol Boat Project is the largest and most complex defence co-operation project ever funded by Australia.

Each patrol boat has a length of 31.5 metres (103 ft 4 in), a beam of 8.1 metres (26 ft 7 in), a draught of 1.8 metres (5 ft 11 in), and a full load displacement of 162 tonnes. They are fitted with two Caterpillar 3516TA diesel engines, which provide 2,820 horsepower (2,100 kW) to two propeller shafts, driving the vessel at a maximum of 20 knots (37 km/h; 23 mph). Pacific-class vessels have a maximum range of 2,500 nautical miles (4,600 km; 2,900 mi) at 12 knots (22 km/h; 14 mph), and can remain at sea for up to ten days. Armament varies depending on the operating nation; the patrol boats may carry GAM-BO1 20 mm guns, 7.62 mm machine guns, or 12.7 mm machine guns, and these need not be permanently fitted. Each ship carries a Furuno 1011 surface search radar, which operates in the I band. The ship's company varies between 14 and 18, depending on the operating nation. In order to reduce construction and maintenance costs, the vessels were built to commercial, as opposed to military, standards. This facilitates companies in the operating nations to be capable of providing parts and minor maintenance in mind.

There were initial problems with the propellers, engine cooling systems, and air conditioning, but these were fixed before the completion of the third ship of the class. The class underwent refits during each ship's seventh or eighth year of operation, and again at the fifteenth year (which was ongoing until 2012). This has extended the predicted service life of the class to 2027.

=== Derivatives ===
Several variant designs for the Pacific class have been produced by Australian Shipbuilding Industries (later Transfield ASI, then Tenix), for a variety of operators.

Four patrol boats of a slightly shortened 31-metre (102 ft) design were produced for the Kuwait Coast Guard. An unarmed version of this design is also marketed to the operators of oil platforms as a crew transport.

Six modified versions of the Pacific class were built for the Hong Kong Marine Police as the Protector class. The main difference is the installation of a pump-jet engine to supplement the main propulsion.

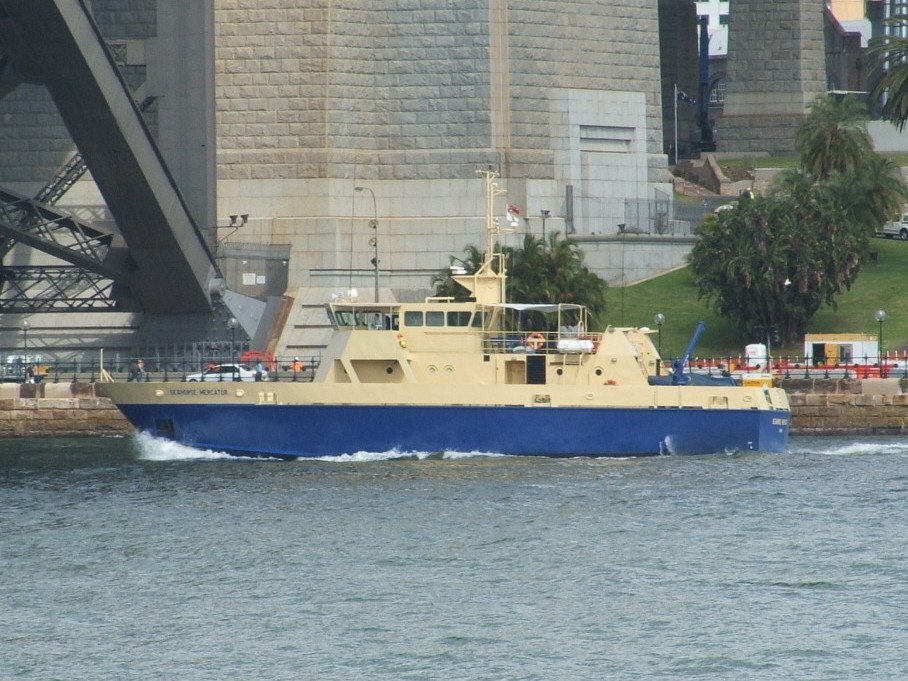
Seahorse Mercator, a navigation training vessel based on the Pacific-class hull design

A single navigation training vessel, Seahorse Mercator, was built for Defence Maritime Services in 1999 which operates the ship under contract to the Royal Australian Navy. Although the hull design is the same, the interior and superstructure are significantly modified. The Seahorse Mercator design was used as the basis for the Royal Canadian Navy's eight Orca-class patrol vessels, although Canadian engineers modified the Orcas to the point where they only share the basic hull shape with the Australian ship.

A 35-metre (115 ft), all-aluminium design based on the Pacific-class hull, the Ilocos Norte class, was created for the Philippine Coast Guard. Four of these ships were delivered in December 2001, and are used as search and rescue vessels. An option for a follow on order by the Philippines of ten more ships was offered, but has not been used. The Ilocos Norte design was used in 2008 for the New South Wales Police Force patrol vessel Nemesis; the largest police-operated patrol boat in the Southern Hemisphere.

== Role and benefits ==
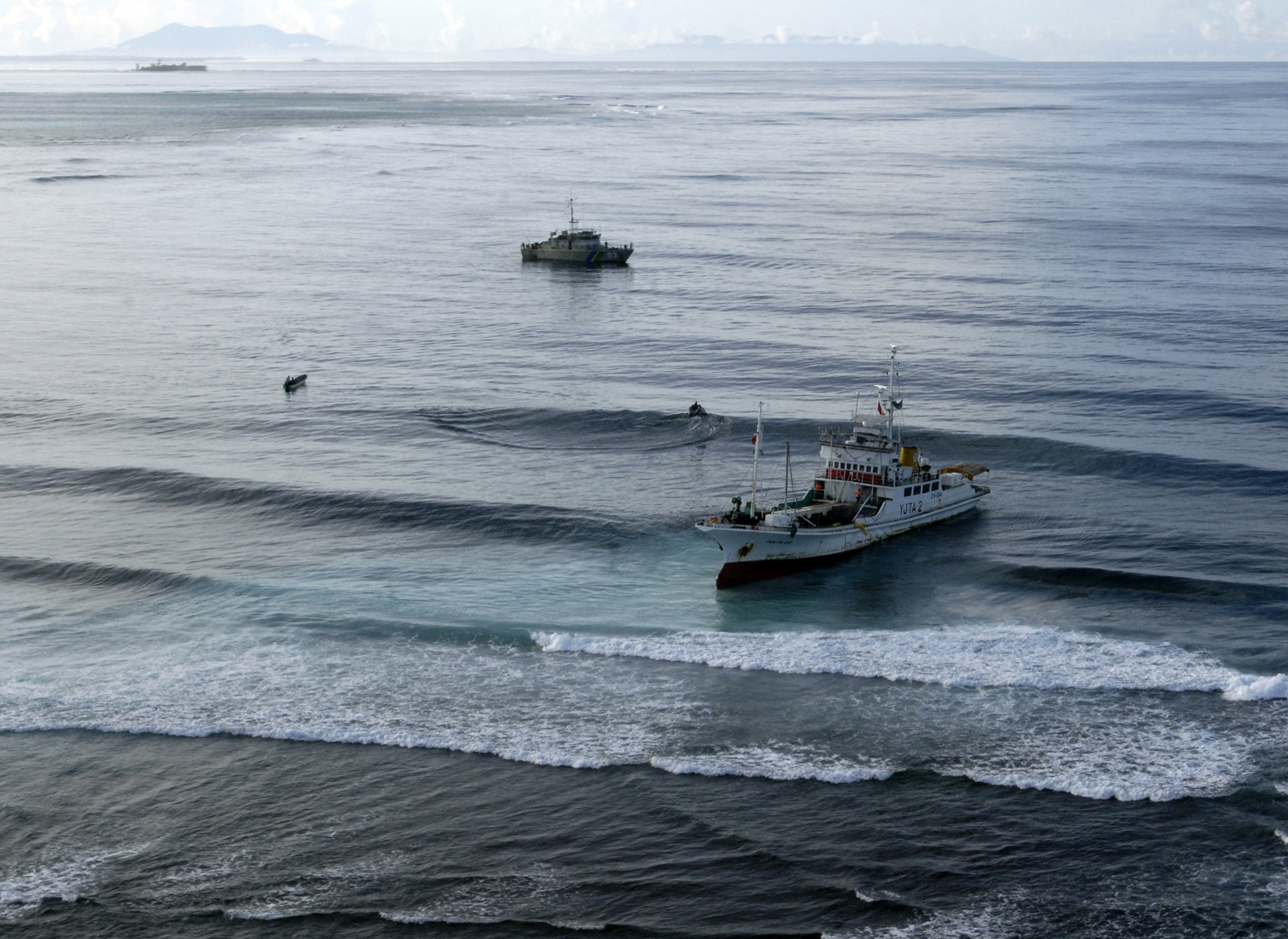
The Solomon Islands patrol boat Lata assisting a stranded fishing vessel (foreground)

The Pacific-class patrol boats are used primarily for maritime surveillance and fisheries protection. They are often the only surveillance capability the operating nation has access to, and their presence has often deterred foreign fishing fleets. The ability to patrol the waters has provided boosts to economies through both fishing fines and improved negotiation stances when discussing foreign fishing rights and fees. As part of the patrol role, the Pacifics have been used for customs inspection of ships, and have stopped some smuggling and drug-running operations. Some nations charter the vessels out to other government agencies or private companies for salvage work, hydrographic surveying, or even tasks like helping to establish aquaculture farms. Pacific-class patrol boats have also seen use in humanitarian roles such as search-and-rescue, towing of disabled vessels, sea safety checks on vessels, and inter-island transport, particularly for disaster relief operations.

The patrol boats also provide indirect benefits to the operating nations. Operation of the Pacifics has often required the expansion of maritime facilities, providing jobs and facilitating access for other ships. In addition to the economic boost from fishing fees and fines, improved hydrographic charts created by the ships contributes to boosting tourism. The ships are seen as miniature warships, and are a point of pride and prestige for the island nations. Crew training by the Australian Maritime College (AMC) has increased the number of trained seafarers in the operating nations, improving the skill level of each nation's maritime sector.

The Pacific Patrol Boat Program has also provided benefits to Australia and New Zealand. These nations enjoy an improved strategic presence in the region, and the naval advisors supplied to operating nations create personal networks within those nations, while improving the skill set and knowledge of the Pacific-class operators. These advisors regularly interact with officials from agencies outside the normal scope of diplomats, and can obtain political and strategic information inaccessible through other avenues. The naval advisors also allow the military-operated vessels to maintain links to larger naval forces. The ability for the operating nations to provide their own humanitarian support likewise reduces the need for Australian and New Zealand assets to become involved in relatively small-scale incidents.

== Support and infrastructure ==
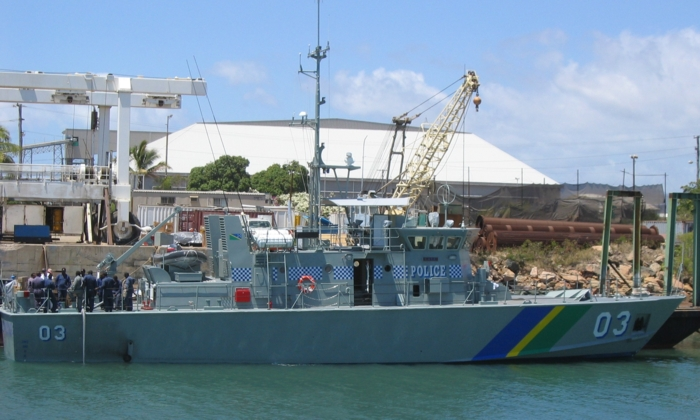
Royal Solomon Islands police vessel Lata in Townsville Harbour during a 2005 maintenance visit

Australian Shipbuilding Industries (later Tenix) provides support facilities for the class in Brisbane, Australia, and Suva, Fiji.

Crew training for the Pacific-class patrol boats is offered by the Australian Department of Defence and the Australian Maritime College (AMC). The AMC runs an average of 32 classes per year in support of the Pacific Patrol Boat Program. The AMC does not possess a Pacific-class patrol boat to use as a training vessel; instead, the 13-metre (43 ft) TV Pinduro is fitted with identical electronic equipment.

The cost of the project to Australia as of 1998 has been A$249 million. Each recipient country has funded most operating costs, with the United States contributing to the costs of Palau, the Marshall Islands, and the Federated States of Micronesia through the Compact of Free Association.

Following the 2006 Fijian coup d'état, Fiji was suspended from the program and the associated support. Fiji rejoined the program in 2015.

== Operators ==
Twelve nations operate Pacific-class patrol boats, as part of their military, coast guard, or police force:

- Papua New Guinea (4 ships),
- Fiji (3),
- Federated States of Micronesia (3),
- Tonga (3),
- Solomon Islands (2),
- Cook Islands (1),
- Kiribati (1),
- Marshall Islands (1),
- Palau (1),
- Samoa (1),
- Tuvalu (1),
- Vanuatu (1)

Canada's Orca-class patrol vessel is based on the Pacific-class patrol boat though is 15% larger.

== Ships ==
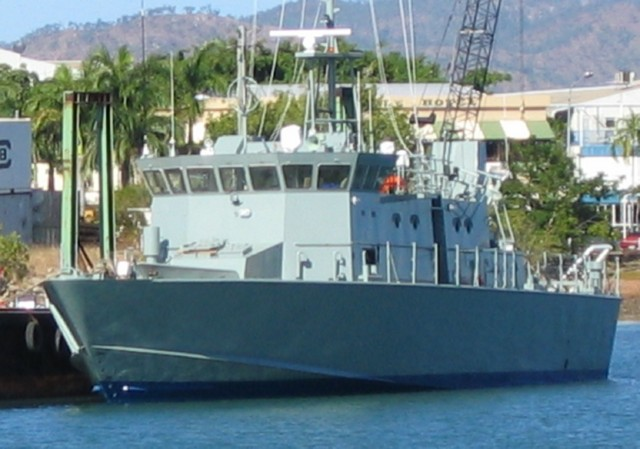
The Vanuatu police vessel RVS Tukoro in Townsville during 2005

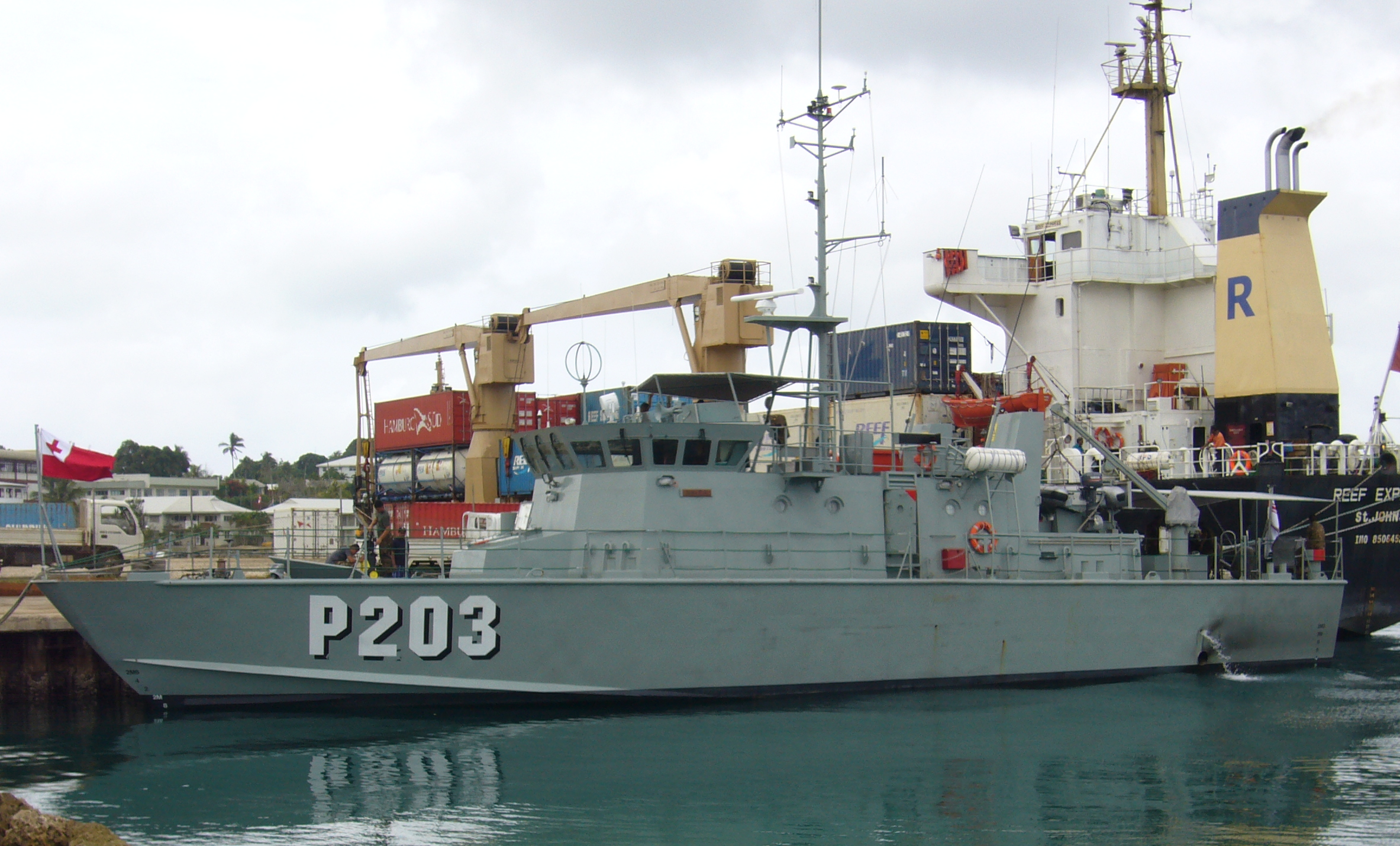
Tongan Navy patrol boat VOEA Savea

Disposition of Pacific Forum patrol boats
Boat no.	Name	Pennant	Country	Handover Date	Retired	Organisation
1	HMPNGS Rabaul ex-Tarangau	P01	Papua New Guinea	1987-05	2018-08-03	Defence Force
2	RVS Tukoro		Vanuatu	1987-06		Police
3	HMPNGS Dreger	P02	Papua New Guinea	1987-10	2021-04-18	Defence Force
4	Nafanua		Samoa	1988-03	2019-06-12	Police
5	RSIPV Lata	03	Solomon Islands	1988-07	2019-09-11	Police
6	HMPNGS Seeadler	P03	Papua New Guinea	1988-10	2021-04-18	Defence Force
7	CIPPB Te Kukupa		Cook Islands	1989-03		Police
8	HMPNGS Moresby ex-Basilisk	P04	Papua New Guinea	1989-07	2021-04-18	Defence Force
9	VOEA Neiafu	P201	Tonga	1989-10	2020-09	Defence Services
10	FSS Palikir	01	Federated States of Micronesia	1990-03		Police
11	VOEA Pangai	P202	Tonga	1990-06	2020-04-23	Defence Services
12	FSS Micronesia	02	Federated States of Micronesia	1990-11		Police
13	VOEA Savea	P203	Tonga	1991-03	2019-06	Defence Services
14	RMIS Lomor	03	Marshall Islands	1991-06		Sea Patrol
15	RSIPV Auki	04	Solomon Islands	1991-11	2021-03-04	Police
16	RKS Teanoai	301	Kiribati	1994-01		Police
17	RFNS Kula	201	Fiji	1994-05	2019-12-22	Navy
18	HMTSS Te Mataili	801	Tuvalu	1994-10		Police
19	RFNS Kikau	202	Fiji	1995-05		Navy
20	RFNS Kiro	203	Fiji	1995-10	2016	Navy
21	PSS President H.I. Remeliik	001	Palau	1996-05	2020-03-13	Police
22	FSS Independence	03	Federated States of Micronesia	1997-05		Police

== Guardian-class replacement ==
The continuation of the Pacific Patrol Boat Program through a second generation of ships has been considered likely throughout the years, due to the benefits and capabilities provided to the operating nations, along with the work provided to the Australian shipbuilding industry. During the early 2000s, variants of the RAN's Armidale class or the RNZN's Protector class were considered appropriate, although there were concerns that such complex vessels would be too challenging and financially restrictive to maintain by some of the smaller participating nations. A 2008 report also suggested discontinuing the program, due to rising operational costs being imposed on Australia (over double the expected annual cost of A$12 million two years in a row), poor operating rates (averaging 36 days at sea per ship per year) linked to the operating nations' difficulties in crewing and maintaining the ships, and a lack of support from the other nations with interests in the Pacific.

In June 2014, the Australian government announced that a replacement class of at least 20 vessels would be built by Australia as part of a new Pacific Patrol Boat Program. The A$2 billion Pacific Patrol Boat Replacement program (SEA 3036) (including A$594 million for construction and A$1.38 billion for through-life support costs) will replace the existing Pacific-class vessels, plus include East Timor as a new recipient. A request for tender was open to Australian shipbuilders on 5 March 2015, and concluded on 17 June. Tenderers are asked to submit proposals for a 40-metre (130 ft) steel-hull vessel with a range of 2,500 nautical miles (4,600 km; 2,900 mi) at 12 knots (22 km/h; 14 mph), a top speed above 20 knots (37 km/h; 23 mph), and an operational endurance of 20 days. The replacement patrol boats must be designed to commercial standards and easy to maintain. They will not be constructed with weapons fitted, but must be capable of having them installed later. Operation of the new patrol boats will be supplemented by aerial surveillance and intelligence from Australia, under the Pacific Maritime Security Program.

In April 2016, Prime Minister Malcolm Turnbull announced that Austal had been selected to construct the vessels and in May 2016 a contract was signed for 19 Guardian-class vessels. An additional two vessels were offered to East Timor to be purchased at an agreed fixed price. This offer was subsequently accepted. The Guardian class is 39.5 m long, capable of travelling at 20 knots (37 km/h; 23 mph) and at 12 knots (22 km/h; 14 mph) possesses a 3,000 nautical miles (5,600 km; 3,500 mi), accommodates 23 people, carries a 6.35 m RHIB and has provision to be fitted with a 30 mm main gun and two 12.7 mm machine guns. The first vessel was launched on 29 May 2018 with completion expected in October 2018 and is to be gifted to Papua New Guinea.
