= Hutuna =

Village in the Solomon Islands

Coordinates: 11°46′47.3″S 160°26′53.9″E

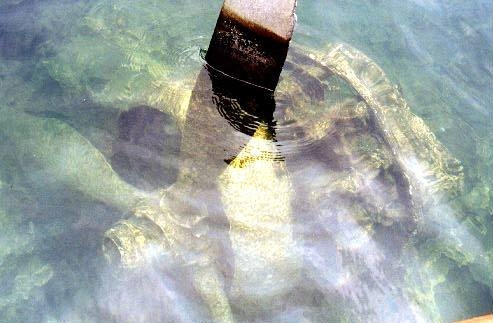
A PBY engine which had been hauled close to the shoreline. Image taken 1995

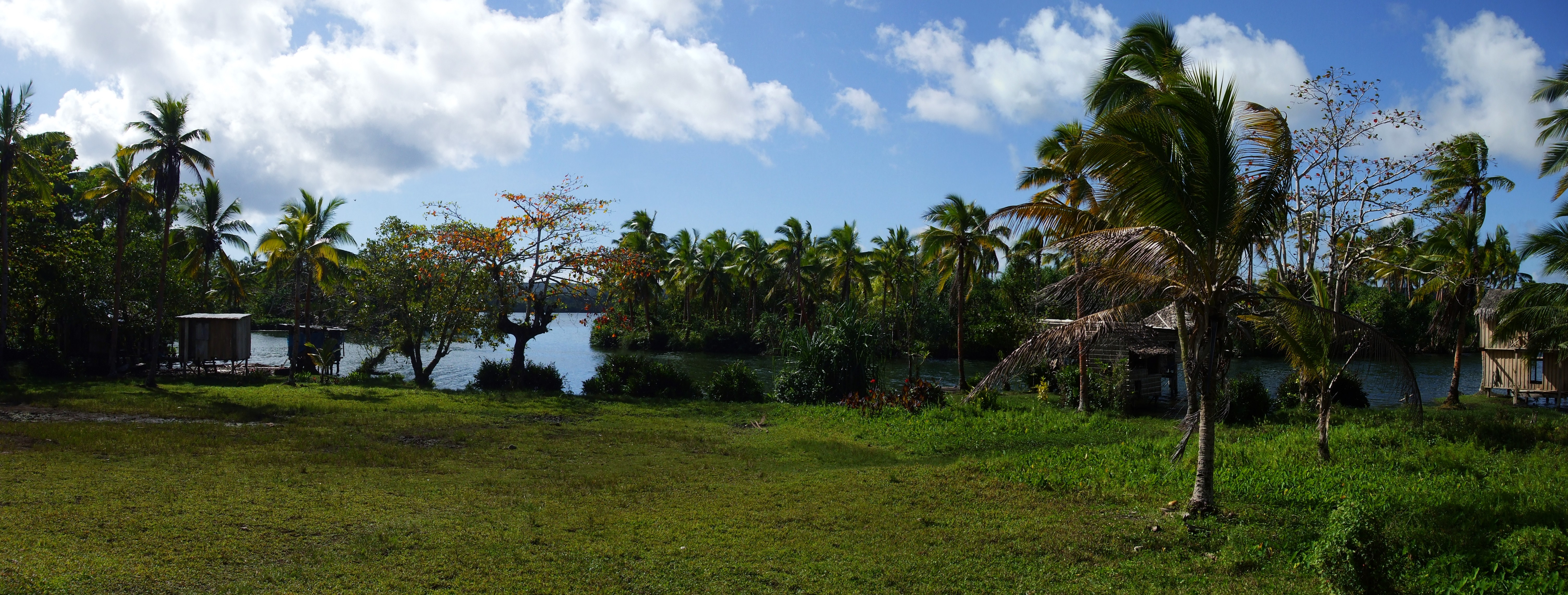
Typical view of Lake Tegano. Taken September 2008

Hutuna (sometimes spelt Hutuana) is a village in the Solomon Islands, on Rennell Island in the Rennell and Bellona province.

The village is in a setting with a sunken PBY Catalina flying plane sitting in 4 metres (13 ft) of water about 50 metres (160 ft) offshore. It is about a 30-minute boat ride from the lake end or a 1.5-hour walk from Tegano. There is a large playing field in the centre of the village.

Hutuna is the site of the eighth People First Network email station, which was established in 2003. Hutuna was one of the sites included in the 2004 JICA-USP research on the impacts of the ICT on rural development.

== Location ==
It is on Lake Tegano and most eastern village on the island. This village is a 3-hour drive from Tigoa to Te Vaitahe where the road ends at the lake foreshore. The village is a further 1-hour boat trip.

== Population ==
The population is approximately 300 people; the population fluctuates due to the number of people that leave their family to either go to work or school elsewhere in the Solomon Islands. Others return during the holidays or for Christmas.

== Religion ==
Seventh Day Adventist (SDA).

== Police ==
Generally policing is serviced by the Tigoa police station as well as a local Provincial government employed area Constable.

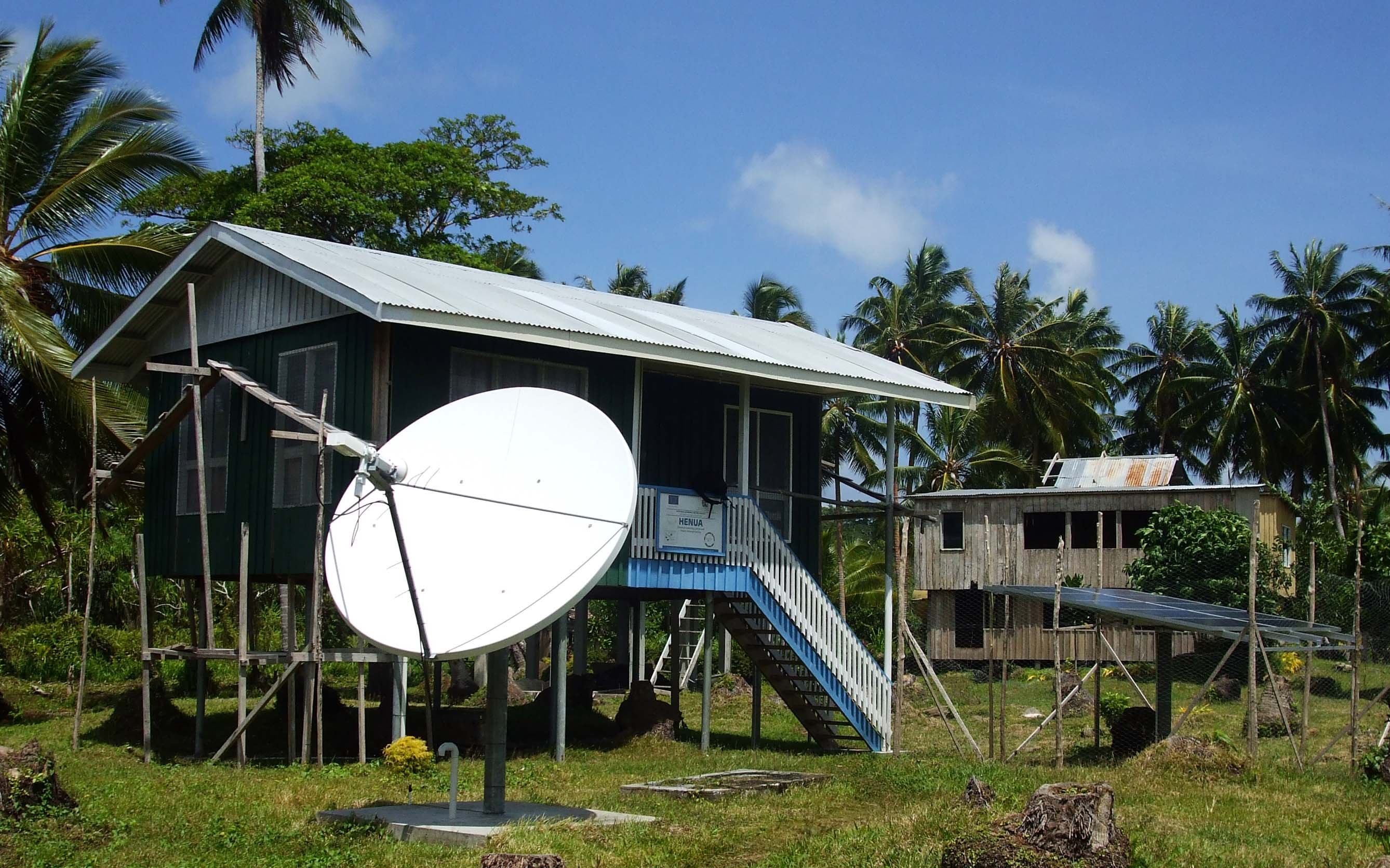
Henua pFNet Internet cafe. Taken 2008
