= Abatai, Rennell Island =

Abatai
- Location in the Solomon Islands
- Coordinates: 11°41′29.54″S 160°18′27.83″E
- Country: Solomon Islands
- Province: Rennell and Bellona
- Island: Rennell Island
- Time zone: UTC+11 (UTC)

Abatai is a village in the Solomon Islands, on Rennell Island in the Rennell and Bellona province. Immediate neighboring villages include Tesauma, Magino, Matamoana and Nukumatangi. Joshua Na'siu is the chief of Abatai village.

== Location ==
Abatai is approximately 40 km or a 2.5-hour drive from Tigoa, East Rennell. The village's location at Kangava Bay, which has white sandy beaches and a coral reef, makes it popular for snorkelling.

== Religion ==
South Seas Evangelical Church (SSEC) and Baptist. The community hosted the first establishment of an ACE school. An education program that is Bible-based and is commended for helping children to read at an early age.

== Police ==
Generally policing is serviced by the Tigoa police station as well as a local Provincial government employed area Constable.

== Mining ==
The village chief made a deal with a Chinese mining company called Bintan Mining. He allowed the company to dig up his gardens to mine for bauxite, used to make aluminium. The results of the mining saw the destruction of graves located in the village beside the South Seas Evangelical Church.
