= Kangua =

Village in the Solomon Islands

Coordinates: 11°31′01.9″S 160°0′41.1″E

Kangua is a village in the Solomon Islands. It is located at Rennell Island in the Rennell and Bellona province of Solomon Islands.

It has a population of approximately 115 people, and the majority religion is the Seventh-day Adventist Church. It is located west of Tigoa Police Post, approximately a 30-minute drive along Copperhead Road. Kangua has one primary school which the majority of children in the village attend.

The helicopter landing field dimensions are 100m long and 60m wide. The place was owned by the descendants of Teikabego, the son of Tuhenua II who was given the northern side of Mugihenua by his father, chief Temoa IV of Segena (Te hakanoho'anga 'oo Mugihenua).
