= Tebaitahe =

Coordinates: 11°42′47″S 160°24′26″E

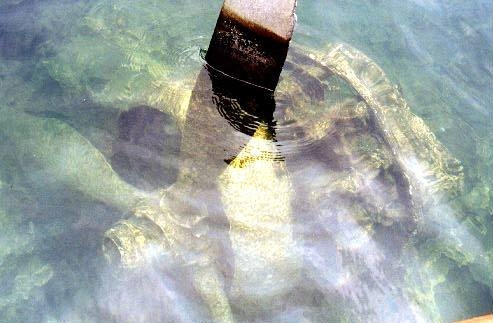
A PBY engine which had been hauled close to the shoreline. Image taken 1995

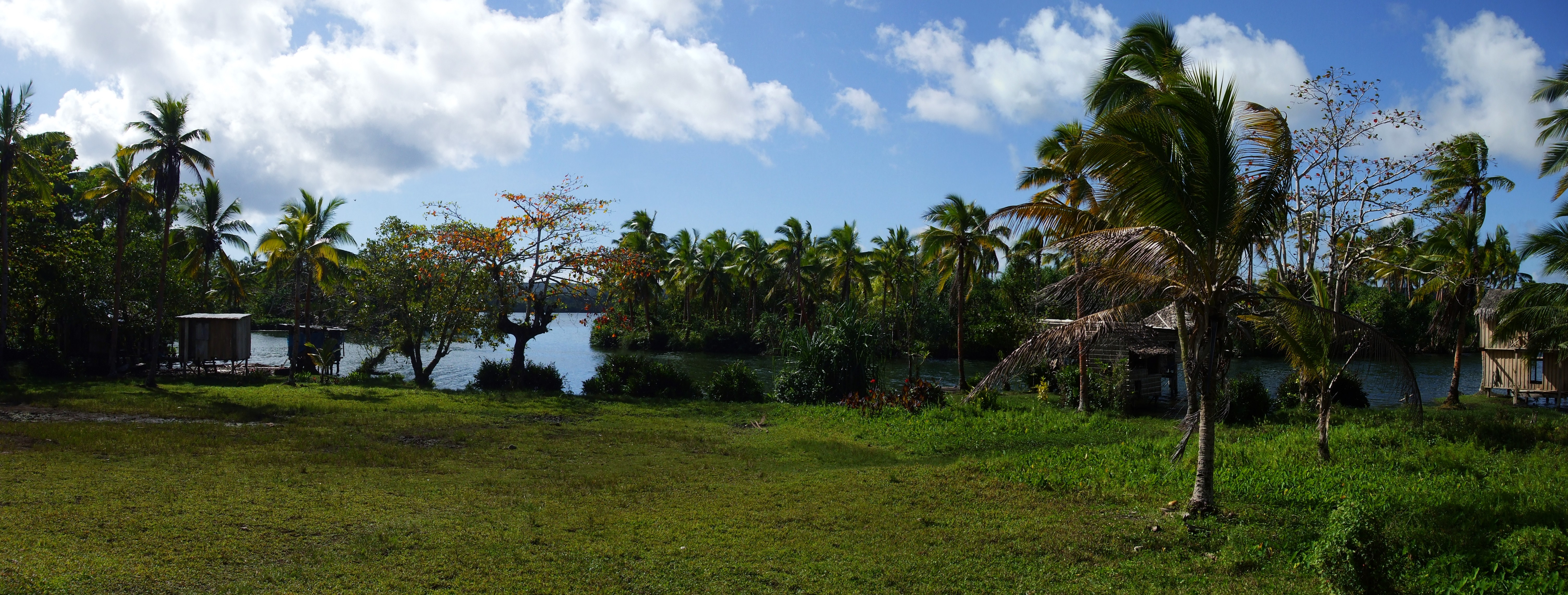
Typical view of Lake Tegano. Taken September 2008

Tebaitahe (sometimes spelled as Tevaitahe) is a village in the Solomon Islands, on Rennell Island in the Rennell and Bellona province.

== Location ==
Located at the end of the main road about 2 ¾ hr drive from Tigoa. This village is located on the shore of Lake Tegano. Travel easterly for 30 km from Tigoa until T-intersection just prior to Lavangu, turn left and travel for 18 km.

== Population ==
200 people approx

== Religion ==
South Sea Evangelical Church (SSEC)

== Police ==
Generally policing is serviced by the Tigoa police station as well as a local Provincial government employed area Constable.

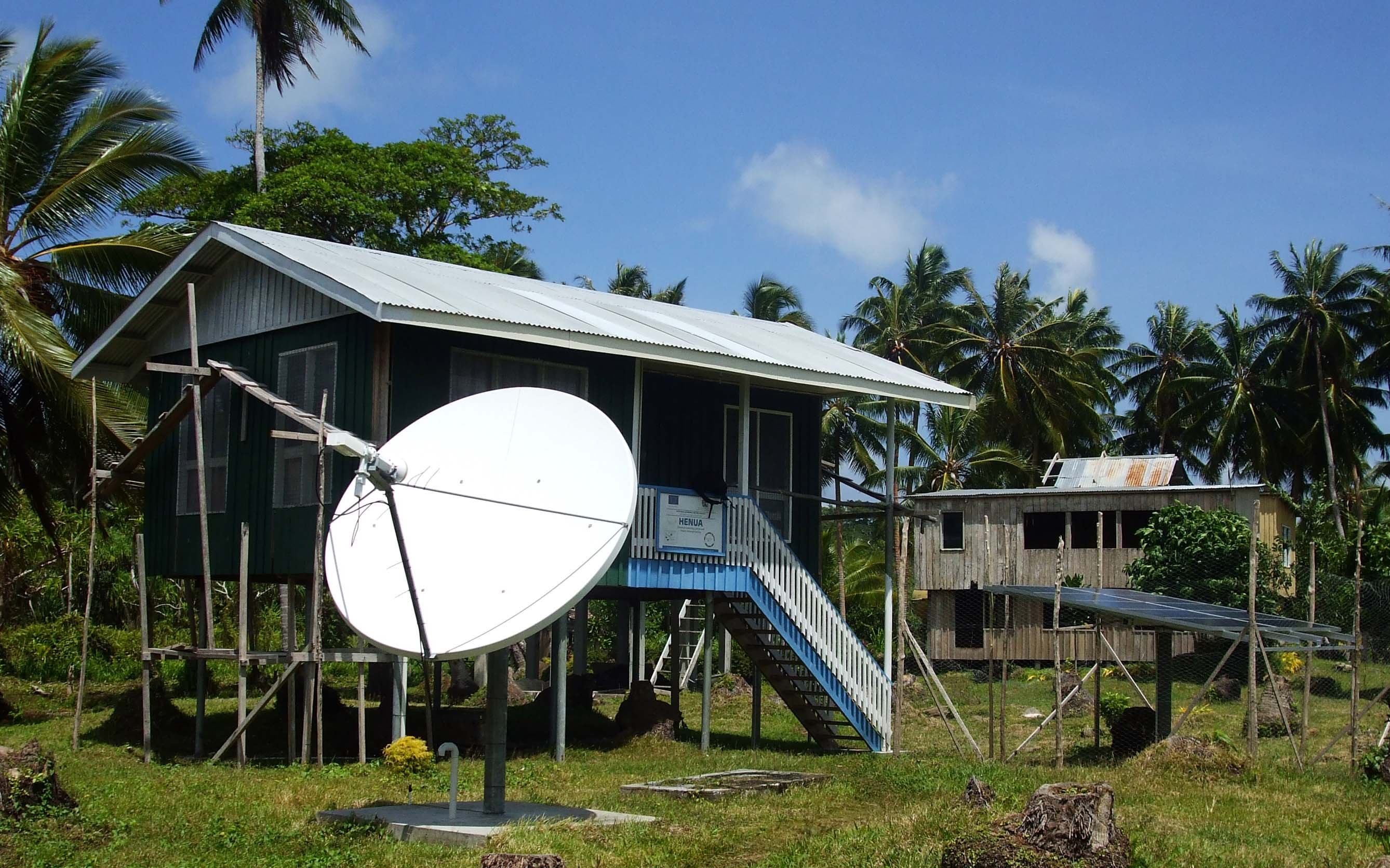
Henua pFNet Internet cafe. Taken 2008

The Royal Solomon Island Police has a Banana boat located at this village. The Outboard motor is stored in the police station at Tigoa.
