= Teabamagu =

Village on Rennel Island, Solomon Islands

Coordinates: 11°38′47.68″S 160°17′21.25″E

Teabamagu is a village in the Solomon Islands, on Rennell Island in the Rennell and Bellona province.

== Location ==
Travel easterly for approx 50 min from Tigoa. (Kanava village located just prior)

== Population ==
70 people approx.

== Religion ==
Life Changing Mission (LCM)

== Police ==
Generally policing is serviced by the Tigoa police station.
