= Gongona =

Gongona is a small village in the Solomon Islands, on Rennell Island in the Rennell and Bellona province, with a population of only about 150 people. It is located at east of Tigoa, on the southern side of Copperhead road, and features a helicopter landing site. It is best known for its Sporting events, which occur every Thursday, with over 300 people attending..
