= Solomons Baptist Association =

Christian Baptist association

The Solomons Baptist Association is a Baptist Christian denomination affiliated with and cooperating in the American Baptist Association.

== History ==
Neil Morley, a missionary sent by Antioch Missionary Baptist Church of Lynwood, California, entered the Solomon Islands in 1969. At that time the country was a protectorate of Great Britain, but gained its independence in 1978. This area consists of 10 larger islands and 4 groups of smaller islands. The native peoples of the Solomons are Melanesian.

From its beginning in 1969 until 2002, the work of the American Baptist Association in the Solomons had grown to 56 churches, consisting of one congregation on Bellona, eight congregations on Guadalcanal, 42 congregations on Malaita, three congregations on Rennell, one congregation on Russell, and one congregation in Western Province. Solomons Baptist Association represents about 95% of the Baptist work existing on the Solomon Islands, which in turn makes up about 10% of the mostly Christian religions in the country. The work is largely self-supporting, with the churches being pastored by native Solomon Islanders.

The faith and practice of the churches of the Solomons Baptist Association is the same as other churches of the American Baptist Association, which can be described as conservative, evangelical, and landmark.

== Sources ==
- 2002 Yearbook, American Baptist Association
- American Baptist Association: A Survey and Census of its Churches and Associations, by R. L. Vaughn
- Baptists Around the World, by Albert W. Wardin, Jr.
