= Tahanuku =

Coordinates: 11°36′32″S 160°07′36.6″E

Tahanuku is a village in the Solomon Islands, on Rennell Island in the Rennell and Bellona province. The province is the only province in the Solomon Islands where all the inhabitants are Polynesians.

== Overview ==
Tahanuku village is some distance from the Tigoa police post and in the middle of the village on the southern side of Copperhead road is the sports field. It is the most populous of the three villages in ward four.

A single elected provincial member usually represent the villagers under ward four in provincial level. Ward four is often referred to as the Kanaba district when on the island.

The village is the only mountainous village in Rennell. Most of the villagers build their houses on the rocky forest and coconut palm hills that surround the field and along the road. The villagers also have access to numerous cave waters, with the largest 20 meter in diameter, and an as yet unmeasured depth. This cave's water and open pools are very cold and clean with tiny stones at the bottom, which are good for drinking and swimming.

Most of the villagers, as on the rest of the island are subsistence farmers. Crops include sweet potato and yam as well as the taro that is grown in swampy areas. Visitors are usually welcomed with a coconut before receiving prepared meals.

At the south of the village, a truck trail leads to Lughuhi Bay, one of the only loading ports in Rennell accessible by heavy machines. The road was constructed by a Japanese mining company, the MITSUI. In one part of the road, there are eight turning points before reaching the cliff top from the coast. The road stretches seven and a half kilometers. There are many interesting sites to see along the road, while listening to noises of various unique birds. Villagers often use this track for hunting birds, like pigeon.

== Leadership ==
The village has a traditional chief and is also guided by Christian religious leaders from the South Sea Evangelical Church, one of the five main churches in the Solomon Islands. The leaders usually organize and maintain the social integrity of the village. The ringing of church bells is a regular sound at dusk and dawn announcing worship services. They are held at the church building located on one of the small hills in the center of the village.

== Social services ==
There is only a primary school in the village. There is also a clinic, but no doctor or nurse and rarely any medicines. Sick patients have to go to the provincial hospital at Tigoa or wait for a visit by the provincial health workers.

== Recreation site ==
The layout of the field is a well used play ground for the locals. The dimensions are 30m and 50m wide at the western and eastern ends respectively and 44m and 57m long at the southern and northern ends respectively. Houses are quite close to both the southern and eastern edges. There is high ground to the west north and east which puts properties higher than the field and many have iron roofs, because of strong winds now usually experienced in the beginning of new years.
