= Niupani =

Coordinates: 11°43′47.16″S 160°26′3.75″E

Niupani is a village in the Solomon Islands, on Rennell Island in the Rennell and Bellona province.

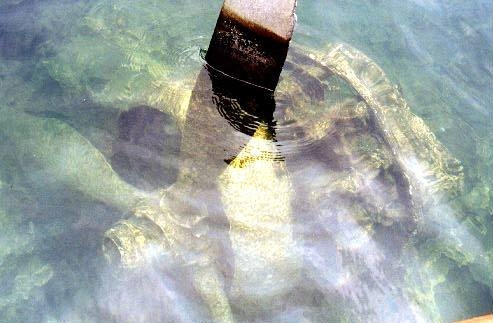
A PBY engine which had been hauled close to the shoreline. Image taken 1995

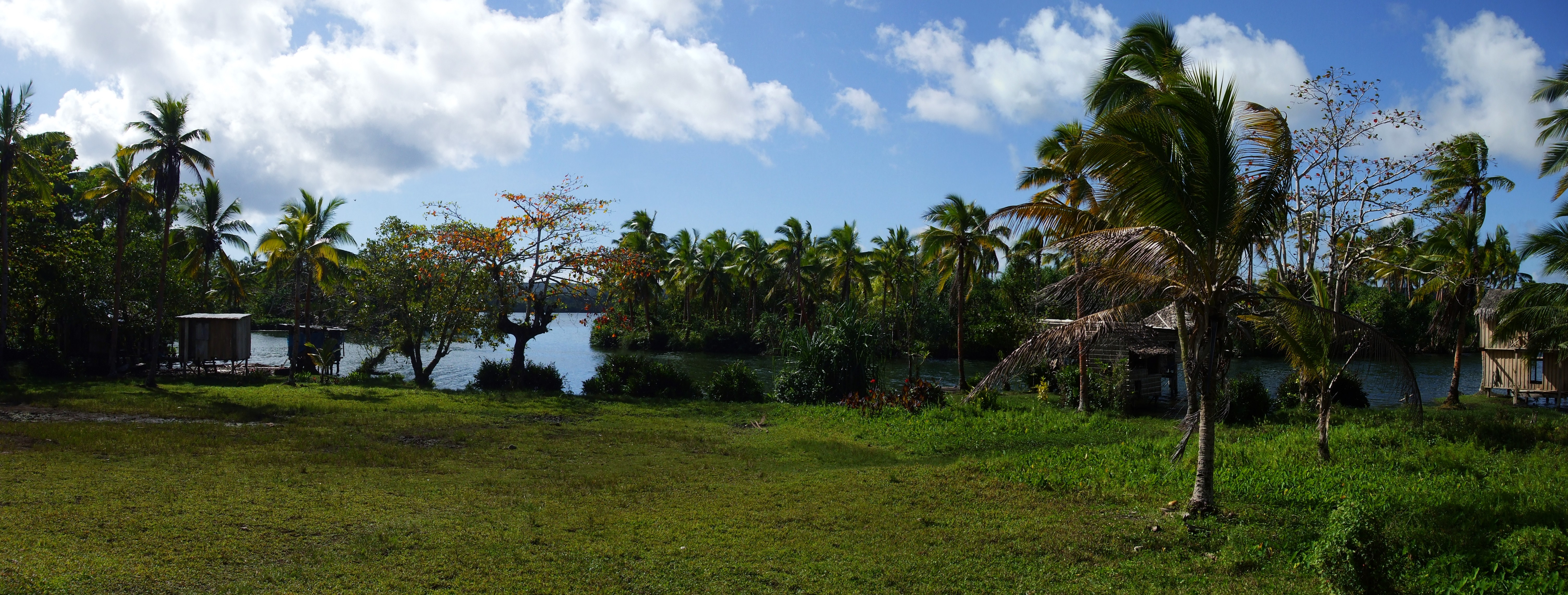
Typical view of Lake Tegano. Taken September 2008

== Location ==
This village is on the Eastern side of Lake Tegano and accessible by boat in approximately 30 minutes, or a walk to the village from the road end takes about an hour. Approximately 50 km, 3hr drive from Tingoa.

== Population ==
There are approximately 250 people.

== Religion ==
South Seas Evangelical Church (SSEC)

== Police ==
Generally policing is serviced by the Tigoa police station as well as a local Provincial government employed area Constable.

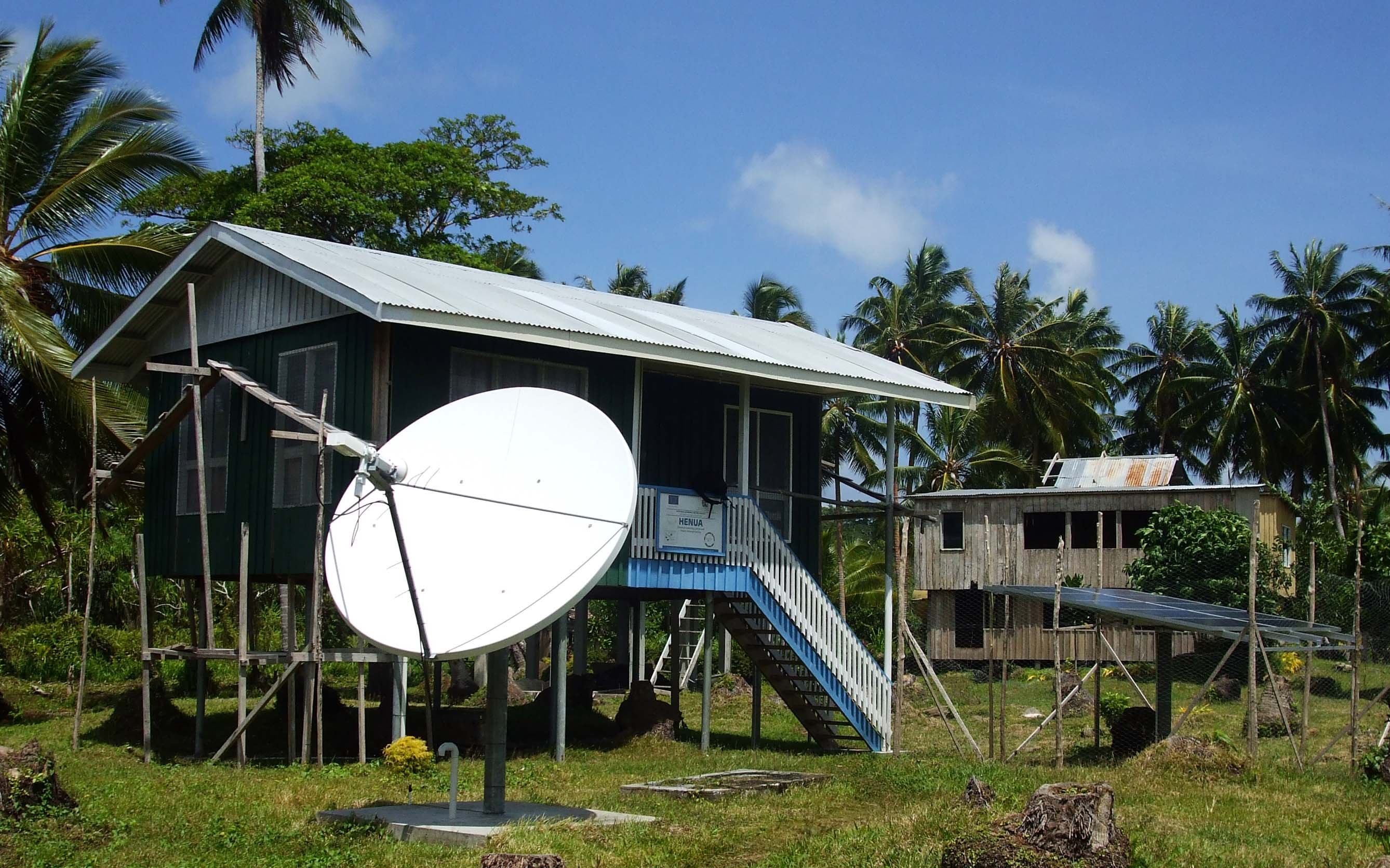
Henua pFNet Internet cafe. Taken 2008

This village is split due to a land dispute that has been going on for over 10 years
