= Lavungu =

Village on Rennell Island, Solomon Islands

Coordinates: 11°38′47.69″S 160°17′21.26″E

Lavungu (also spelt Lavanggu) is a village in the Solomon Islands, on Rennell Island in the Rennell and Bellona province.
