= Tegano, Rennell Island =

Village in the Solomon Islands

Coordinates: 11°44′26.82″S 160°26′5″E

Tegano is a village in the Solomon Islands, on Rennell Island in the Rennell and Bellona province. This village has a guest house in European style and is very popular.

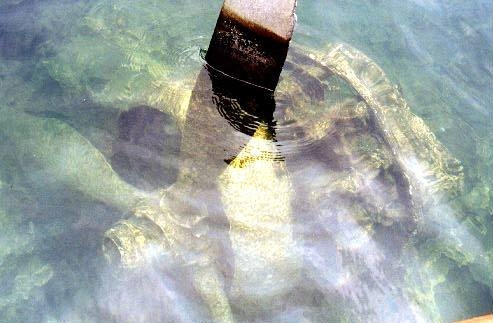
A PBY engine which had been hauled close to the shoreline. Image taken 1995

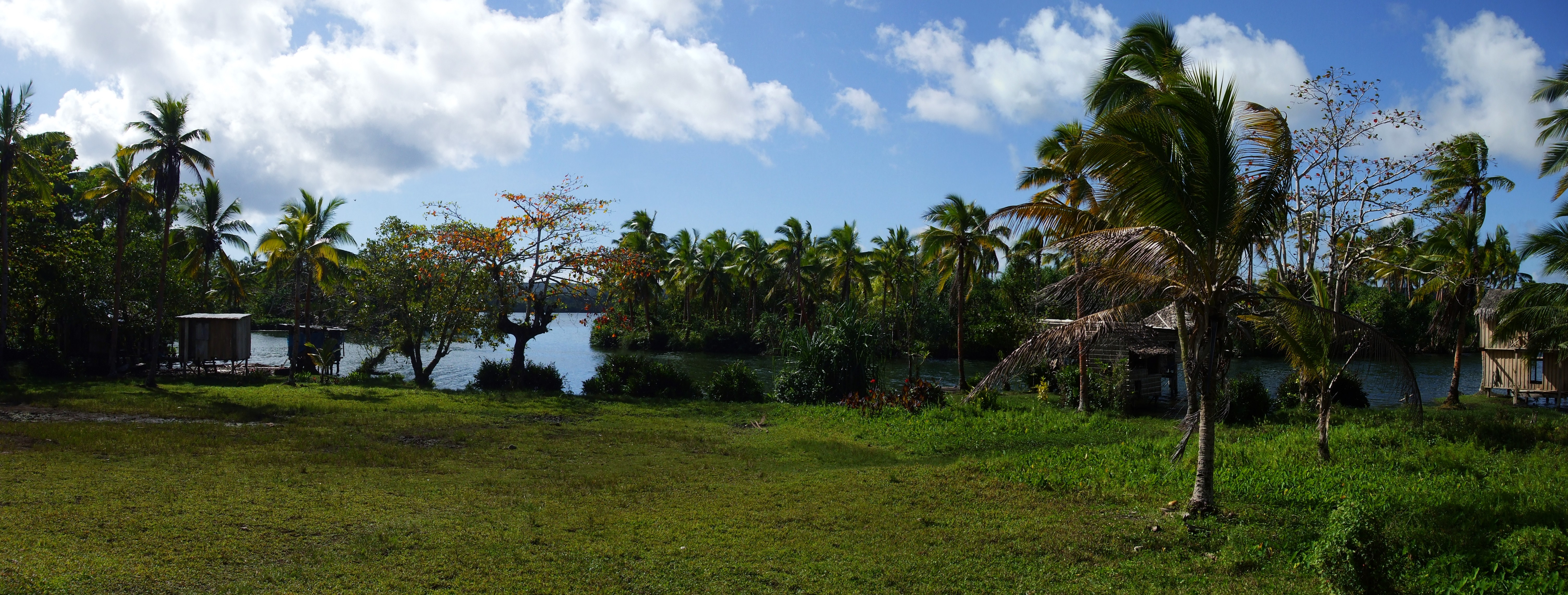
Typical view of Lake Tegano. Taken September 2008

== Location ==
The village is located near the west end of Lake Tegano to the East of Nuipani, with access by boat or a 45-minute walk from Nuipani.

== Population ==
The village has a population of approximately 120 people.

== Religion ==
Seventh-day Adventist Church

== Policing ==
Generally policing is serviced by the Tigoa police station as well as a local Provincial government employed area Constable.
