= Scopula xanthomelaena =

Scientific classification
- Domain: Eukaryota
- Kingdom: Animalia
- Phylum: Arthropoda
- Class: Insecta
- Order: Lepidoptera
- Family: Geometridae
- Genus: Scopula
- Species: S. xanthomelaena

Binomial name
- Scopula xanthomelaena D. S. Fletcher, 1957

Species of geometer moth in subfamily Sterrhinae

Scopula xanthomelaena is a moth of the family Geometridae. It was described by David Stephen Fletcher in 1957. It is found on Rennell Island in the Solomon Islands.
