= Cosmopterix aurella =

Scientific classification
- Domain: Eukaryota
- Kingdom: Animalia
- Phylum: Arthropoda
- Class: Insecta
- Order: Lepidoptera
- Family: Cosmopterigidae
- Genus: Cosmopterix
- Species: C. aurella

Binomial name
- Cosmopterix aurella Bradley, 1959

Synonyms
- Cosmopteryx aurella

Species of moth from the Solomon Islands

Cosmopterix aurella is a moth in the family Cosmopterigidae. It was described by John David Bradley in 1959. It is found on Rennell Island in the Solomon Islands.
