= Tautai Agikimu'a Kaitu'u =

Solomon Islands politician (born 1959)

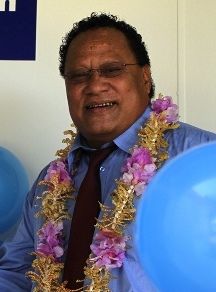
- Kaitu'u in 2015

Minister of Health and Medical Services
- Incumbent
- Assumed office 15 December 2014
- Preceded by: Seth Gukuna

Personal details
- Born: 1959 (age 65–66); Solomon Islands
- Political party: Independent

Tautai Agikimu'a Kaitu'u is a Solomon Islander politician from Rennell Island. He was elected as a member of parliament for the constituency of Rennell Bellona in the 2014 Solomon Islands general election. He is Minister of Health and Medical Services.

Prior to running for the 2014 general election, Kaitu'u worked as a Medical Doctor in Australia.

He was re-elected as a Member of Parliament in the Solomon Islands general election, 2019.
