= Rennell starling =

Conservation status
- Least Concern (IUCN 3.1)

Scientific classification
- Kingdom: Animalia
- Phylum: Chordata
- Class: Aves
- Order: Passeriformes
- Family: Sturnidae
- Genus: Aplonis
- Species: A. insularis

Binomial name
- Aplonis insularis Mayr, 1931

Species of bird

The Rennell starling (Aplonis insularis) is a species of starling in the family Sturnidae. It is endemic to Rennell Island in the Solomon Islands.

The plumage of the Rennell starling is blackish with a green-blue gloss. It has a yellow-orange eye and a short tail. It is an abundant bird of tropical moist lowland forests, secondary growth and coconut plantations.
