= People First Network =

United Nations Development Program

People First Network, also known as PFNet or Pipol Fastaem, started in Solomon Islands as part of UNDP's Solomon Islands Development Administration Planning programme (SIDAPP) and was developed by technical advisor David Leeming, Randall Biliki and others from January 2001. People First Network was initially a series of email stations around the Solomon Islands. The network provides email and other services to very remote rural areas. In particular the project was started as a means to link people to peacemakers following the ethnic tension and civil unrest in 2000, by providing rural communications and participatory news and information service.

In 2004, the network was listed as one of the five finalists for the IPDC-UNESCO Rural Communication Prize for 2003.

== History ==
PFnet is a rural Internet connectivity project, which aimed to promote and facilitate equitable and sustainable rural development and peace building by enabling better information sharing and knowledge building among and across communities forming the Solomon Islands. PFnet's email system, based on HF radio, and Pactor-3 modems, with solar power, permits remote locations on islands across thousands of square kilometres to have access to Internet emails at a fraction of the cost of satellite-based connectivity. PFnet augments this by working with partners to develop applications of the network in many sectors.

The PFnet system, offering basic email services, seeks to improve connectivity while dramatically reducing the prices of communication, making it affordable for low-income users and sustainable over time. As a basic utility to all other activities, the network assists the country, particularly low-income groups, in taking in charge their own development through improved logistics, information and knowledge. Since 2001, PFnet has been an important player in bridging the digital divide in Solomon Islands.

The objectives of the PFnet are to facilitate:

1. Point-to-point communications to and from the remote provinces of the Solomon Islands;
2. Rural development and peace-related information flows among all social groups;
3. The exchange of information between communities and development programmes, NGOs, government offices, the media, businesses and other stakeholders.

The main component of PFnet is the network of community-based and managed email stations located in remote islands across the country. The stations are usually hosted in provincial clinics, community schools, or other accessible and secure public facilities. Email operators act as “infomediaries”, assisting customers with sending and receiving emails at a nominal cost, so that they do not have to be literate in order to use the service.

Now the network is established, it is being used to facilitate the rural networking needs of sectors such as education, health, women, sustainable livelihood programs, finance and agriculture. The operator-assisted facilities are able to directly access web sites using web for mail services, but this aspect is limited by the narrowband. The stations operate sustainably by charging small affordable fees for services.

PFnet also opened the country's first Internet Café in Honiara in 2001, a facility that also serves as the base station and gateway for the email network and as a training facility for a number of rural development stakeholders and the broader public. PFnet also provides substantial information resources and news on its web site and is active in facilitating the flow of trusted news between communities. This is an important part of peace building in a nation torn by ethnic conflict.

PFnet has also worked with stakeholders to help the government develop a national ICT strategy.

In order to better understand these needs and be more effective, in 2004 PFnet conducted a research program into the social impacts and factors affecting the appropriation of the rural ICT by the communities, in partnership with University of the South Pacific and UNDP (funded by JICA).

The People First Network is a project of Rural Development Volunteers Association (RDVA), an NGO partner of the Ministry of Rural Development. It has received funding and technical support from the UNDP, New Zealand Aid, the governments of Britain, Japan and the Republic of China, the EU and AusAid.

== Distance Learning Centre Project ==
The DLCP provides distance education as part of the Education Sector Investment and Reform Programme, implemented by the Rural Development Volunteers Association, the project began Distance Learning Centres in 2006 to provide full internet access to rural areas, using VSAT broadband via a satellite link to Australia.

The distance learning centres use the Toshiba Tecra A5 laptops. The project provides distant learning courses for the University of the South Pacific.

The first DLC was at Pamua on Makira. There are now one in each province, each hosted by a rural community high school.
