= Rennell Island =

Island in Solomon Islands

Rennell
Native name: Mugaba
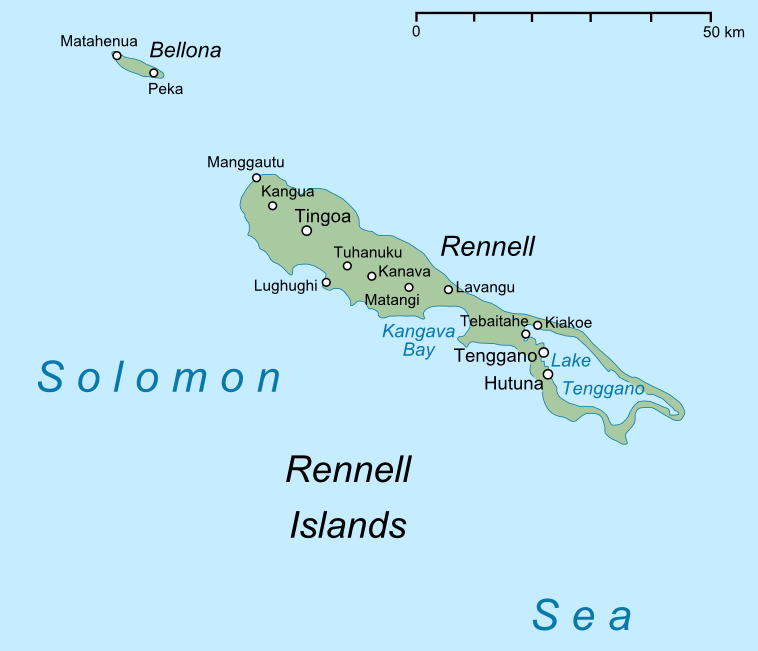

- Location of Rennell Island in Solomon Islands

Geography
- Location: Pacific Ocean
- Coordinates: 11°40′S 160°10′E
- Archipelago: Solomon Islands
- Area: 660.1 km^{2} (254.9 sq mi)
- Length: 80 km (50 mi)
- Width: 14 km (8.7 mi)

Administration
- Solomon Islands
- Province: Rennell and Bellona Province
- Largest settlement: Tigoa

Demographics
- Population: 1,500 (2000)
- Pop. density: 2.2/km^{2} (5.7/sq mi)
- Ethnic groups: Polynesian 100%

Rennell Island, locally known as Mugaba, is the main island of two inhabited islands that make up the Rennell and Bellona Province in the nation state of Solomon Islands. Rennell Island has a land area of 660 square kilometres (250 mi^{2}) and is about 80 kilometres (50 mi) long and 14 kilometres (8.7 mi) wide. It is the second largest raised coral atoll in the world with the largest lake in the insular Pacific, Lake Tegano, a lake that is listed as a World Heritage Site. Rennell Island has a population of about 1,840 persons of Polynesian descent who primarily speak Rennellese, Pijin and some English. Rennell and Bellona Islands are two of the few islands in the otherwise Melanesian Solomon Islands archipelago classified as a Polynesian outlier.

The island lies 236 kilometres (127 nmi; 147 mi) south of Honiara and 1,900 kilometres (1,000 nmi; 1,200 mi) north-east of Brisbane. The provincial capital, Tigoa, is at the western end of the island.

Bauxite mining and logging on the west side of the island was poorly regulated, resulted in spills, and seriously damaged the ecology and economy of the island between 2011 and 2021.

== History ==
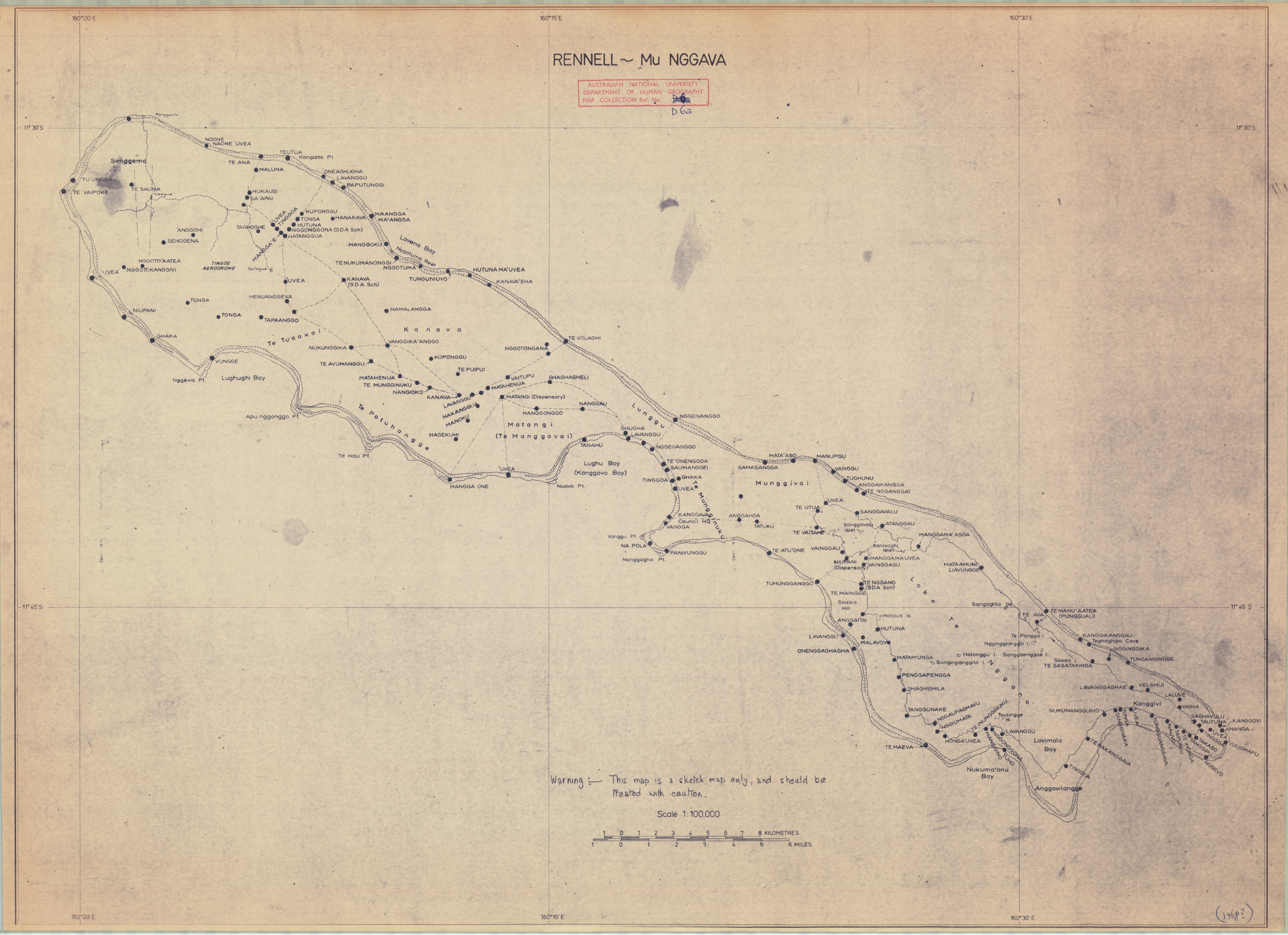
1968 map of Rennell Island

Between 2000 and 1600 BC, people belonging to the Lapita Culture first occupied the island. The next settlement occurred on both Rennell and Bellona around 130 BC, with another major occupation in about 1000 AD. Later settlement of Rennell occurred prior to 1400 AD by Polynesians from Uvea, now Wallis Island.

Captain Butler of HMS Walpole was the first European to discover the islands in 1801. In 1933 the Templeton Crocker Expedition discovered several endemic species on the islands. During the Pacific campaign of World War II Japanese Rufe floatplanes operated from Lake Tegano until American Catalinas used the lake as a base after 1943. The Battle of Rennell Island was the last major naval battle of the Guadalcanal Campaign which occurred between 29 January 1943 and 30 January 1943. At the end of the war, eight Catalinas were scuttled in the lake. The island was later visited by a series of Danish scientific expeditions.

The present-day inhabitants say their ancestors, Kaitu'u, arrived around 1400AD from Ubea, now Wallis and Futuna Islands, crossed the Pacific Ocean and settled on Rennell and Bellona Islands, in the Solomon Islands. One of the villages in Lake Tegano is called Hutuna which is the Rennellese interpretation of Wallis and Futuna.

== Geography ==
The islands are of volcanic origin with basement rocks forming between the late Cretaceous and early Eocene. Tectonic movements raised the seabed to allow coral building. The whole Rennell area is thought to have been initially deposited as coralline algal limestone and then dolomitized. This dolomitic reef complex is overlain by younger undolotomized reef limestone. The island is the second largest upraised coral atoll in the world. It is largely unmodified and includes the largest lake in the South Pacific.

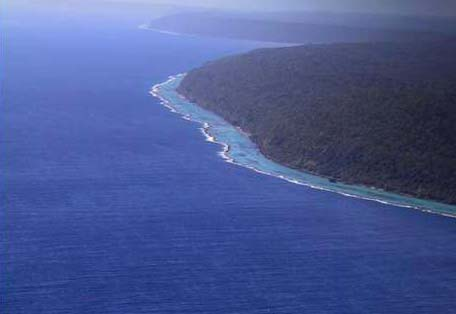
Aerial photo of the coastline of the atoll, 2008

The island is about one hour's flight in a twin engine prop aircraft south of Honiara. It is almost totally surrounded by 120 to 150 metres (390 to 490 feet) cliffs, with the eastern end dominated by a large lake, while the western end is relatively flat with rolling forested hills. One road, known as the Copperhead Road, traverses the length of the island from the Tigoa airstrip in the west to the Labagu port area in the south, with a branch heading east towards the lake.

Kangava Bay has beautiful white sands beach and coral reef which makes it good for snorkeling.

=== Lake Tegano ===
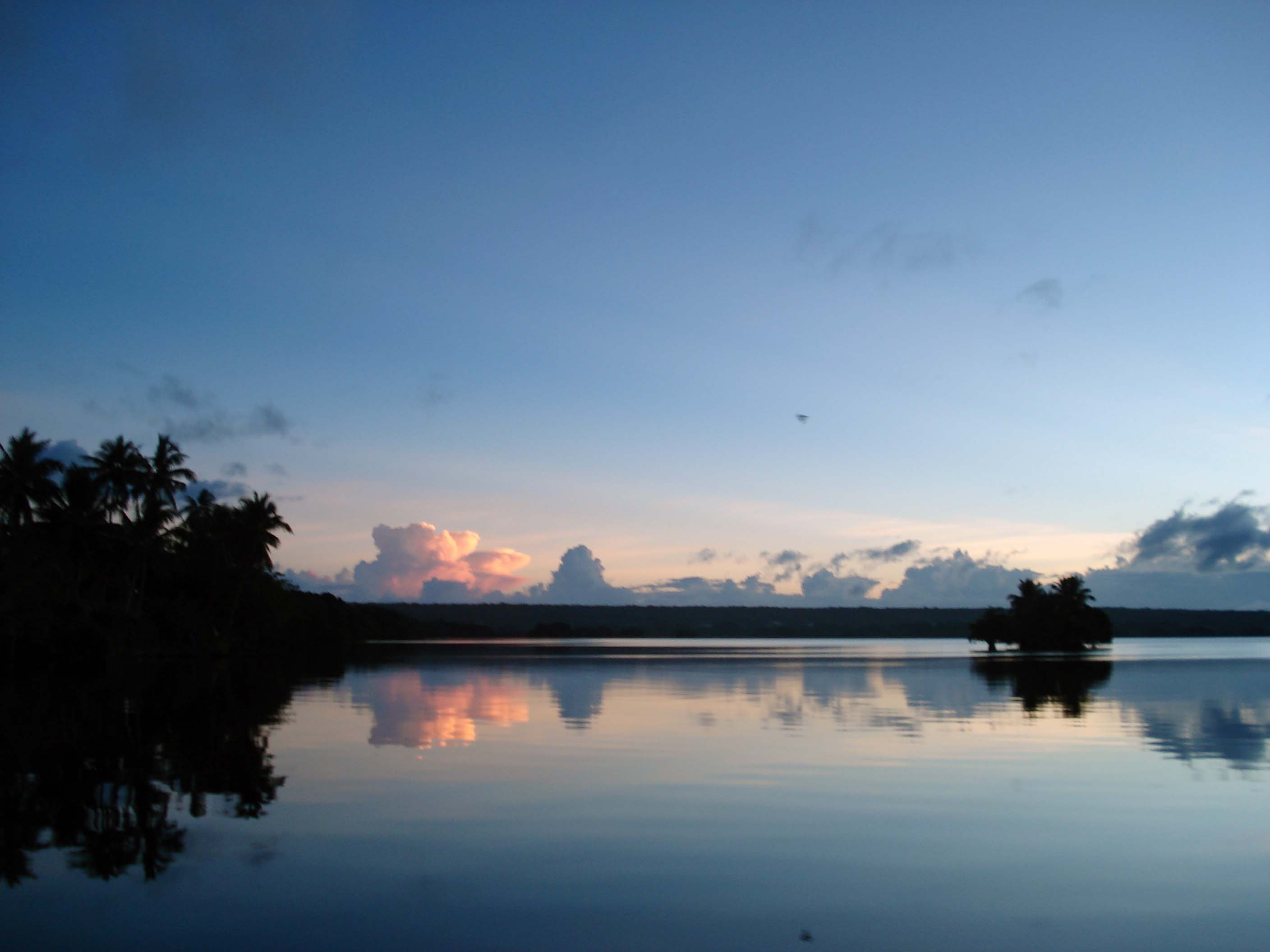
Sunset over Lake Tegano. Taken 2008

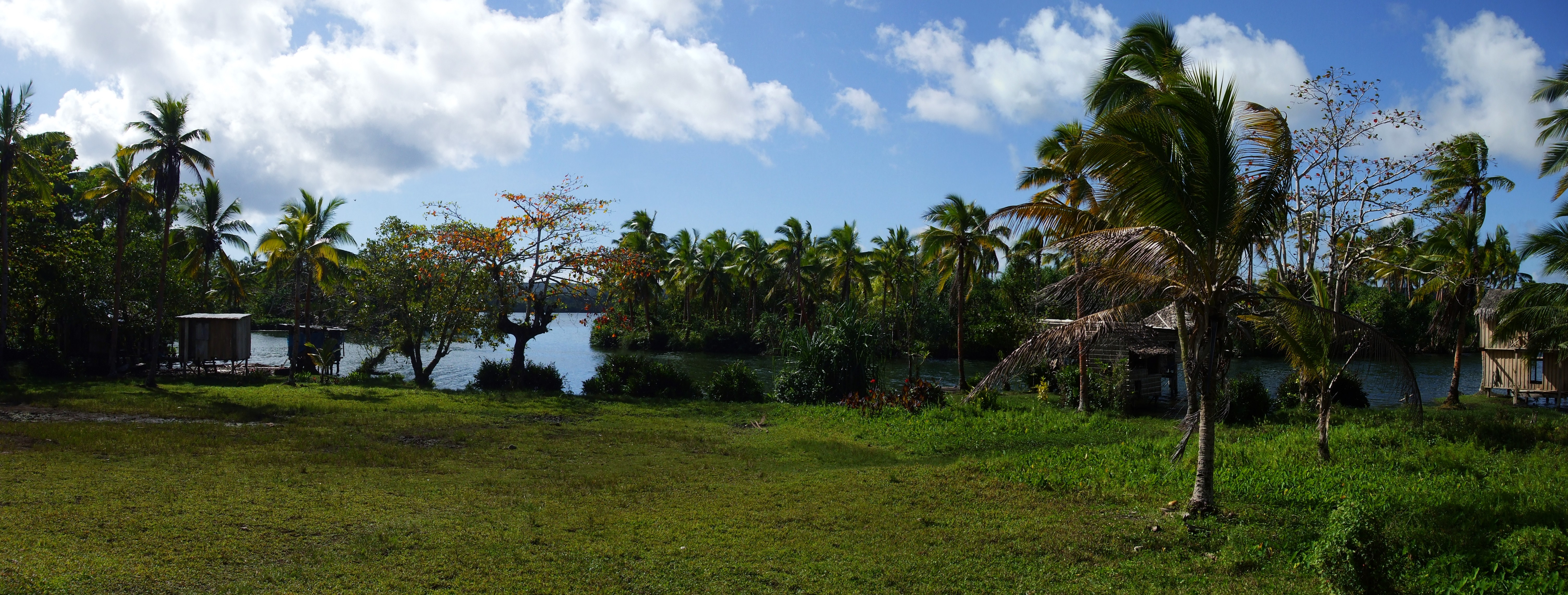
Typical view of Lake Tegano. Taken September 2008

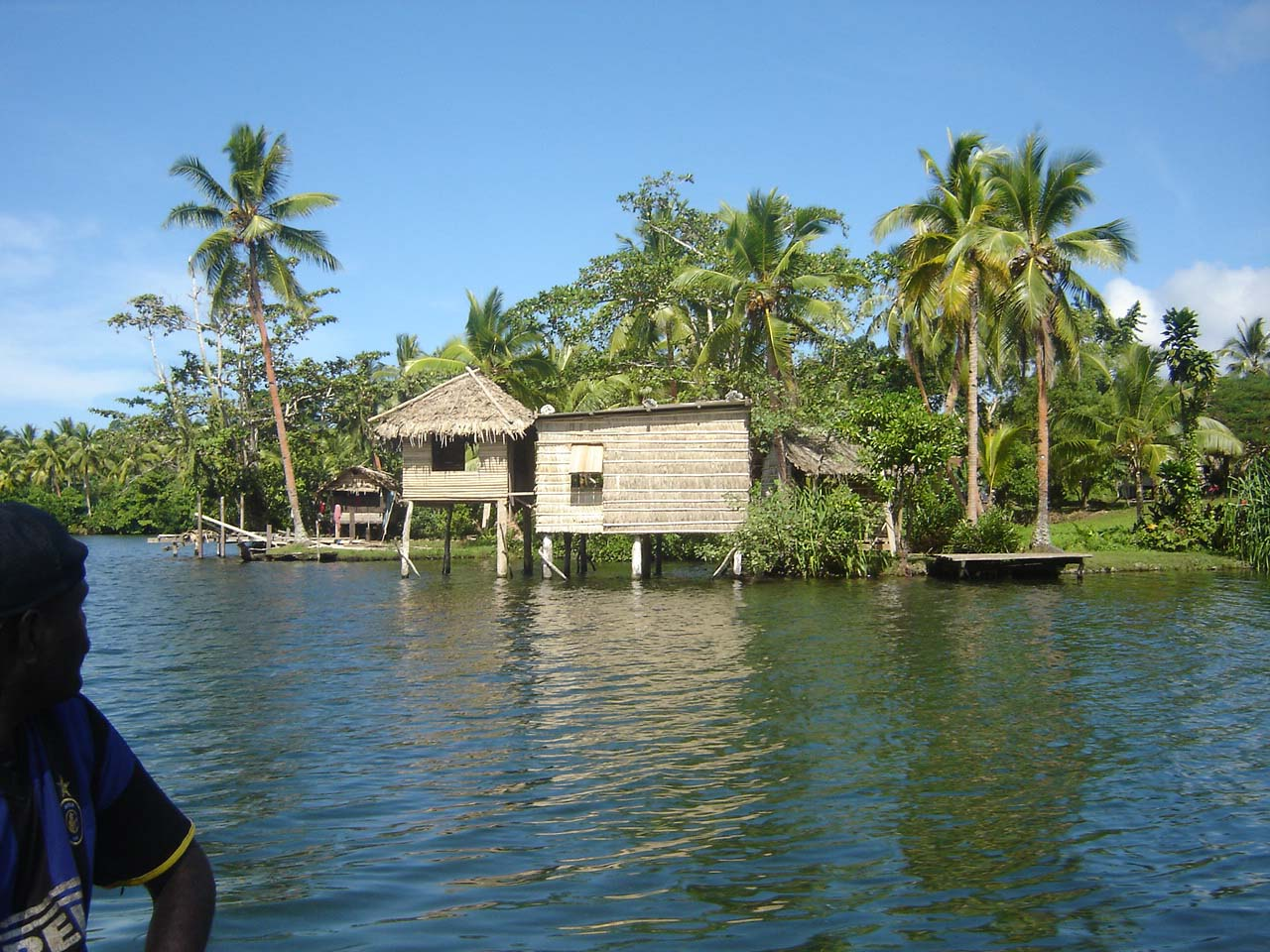
Typical house at lakes edge at Lake Tegano. Taken 2008

Official Solomon Island maps name this Lake Te Nggano, while locals refer to the lake as Tegano or Tungano or Big Water. The lake is 29 kilometres (18 mi) in length and 10 kilometres (6.2 mi) wide, with an area of 155 km^{2} (60 sq mi), which occupies 17.6% of the total area of Rennell Island. The lake is located at East Rennell, the southern portion of Rennell Island, in the central basin which was the old lagoon.

The hard bottom is covered by several meters of suspended mud. The lake has an elevated salt concentration being kept by a subterranean duct system which connects it with the sea.

The water depth is 44 metres (144 feet) and consists of a mixture of brackish fresh and salt water. The average distance from the lake shore to the ocean is 2 kilometres (1.2 miles) with wildlife predominantly eels and water snakes and a bird breeding area. The lake is listed as a World Heritage Site.

On the easternmost point of the lake is the former World War 2 airbase Tigoa. Information from locals claims that there are nine aircraft at the bottom of the lake, with five visible from a boat.

Lake Te Nggano was used as a base for flying boats by both Japanese and American forces during the Pacific War (World War II). Japanese Nakajima A6M2-N Rufe floatplanes operated out of Rennell Island until US air and sea superiority made the base untenable. American PBY Catalinas used the lake as a base after 1943. A detachment from the 2nd Marines was sent from New Hebrides and arrived at Lake Tegano on 12 November 1942 to establish a lookout post.

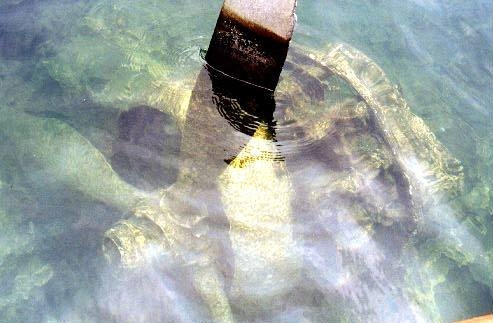
A PBY engine which had been hauled close to the shoreline (1995)

The US forces scuttled eight of the warhorses at the end of hostilities rather than take them home. Reports were made of crash landings due to the coral outcrops within the lake. Members of the local community attempted to retrieve one of the radial engines of the aircraft to use as a generator using only man-power. First it was cut from the wing by diving with snorkels and using hand-tools.

It was then dragged across the coralline rock lake floor by hand-winch. They were overcome in their task by the engine's tremendous weight. They did manage to get it close to the shoreline before giving up, close enough that one of the propeller blades is exposed to the air. Very quickly however, the engine became unusable through corrosion, so further attempts to bring it ashore were abandoned.

=== Climate ===
The temperature averages 23 to 28 °C (73 to 82 °F) with about 4,000 mm (160 inches) of rainfall per year and high humidity during both seasons. South-east trade winds prevail from April to the end of November. The island lies within the band of known cyclone paths and is subject to cyclones at relatively frequent intervals. The latest major cyclone to hit Rennell was Nina in 1993.

=== Flora and fauna ===
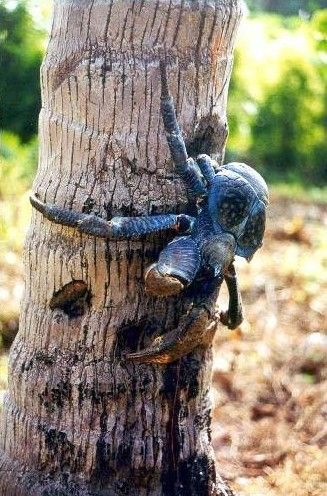
Coconut crab

The islands of Rennell and Bellona are unique within the Solomon Islands, sharing similarities with New Caledonia and Australia as much as the Solomons. They are home to several endemic species, including the Rennell starling (Aplonis insularis) which is a species of starling in the family Sturnidae, the bare-eyed white-eye (Woodfordia superciliosa) which is a species of bird in the family Zosteropidae, the Rennell shrikebill (Clytorhynchus hamlini) which is a species of bird in the family Monarchidae, and the Rennell fantail (Rhipidura rennelliana) which is also a species of bird in the family Rhipiduridae. The Solomons white ibis (Threskiornis molucca pygmaeus) is a dwarf subspecies of the Australian white ibis that is endemic to Rennell and Bellona Islands.

Rennell province also has 25 species of ants, the endemic orchid Dendrobium rennellii near Lake Tegano, two endemic species of Pandanus (P. lacustris and P. rennellensis).[] There are also 11 species of bats in the area including the Rennell flying fox (Pteropus rennelli) which is endemic to the island.

Lake Tegano is the only known location for the endemic sea krait Laticauda crockeri (VU), one of only two known freshwater sea snake species in the world. The other species of sea snake in the lake is Laticauda colubrina. There are five species of geckos, four skinks, the Rennell monitor (Varanus juxtindicus) and three snakes, all of which are species with widespread distributions and are typical of the region. There are 27 species of land snails, seven of which are endemic to the island, coconut crab (Birgus latro) (DD) and two other species of land hermit crabs (Coenobita spp.). A total of 731 insects have been identified from collections made at Rennell and Bellona. Moths (Lepidoptera) have the greatest number of species (246 in total) with 35 species and 25 subspecies exclusive to Rennell and Bellona. Renbel has no indigenous malaria, cane toads, vipers or crocodiles.

== Culture ==
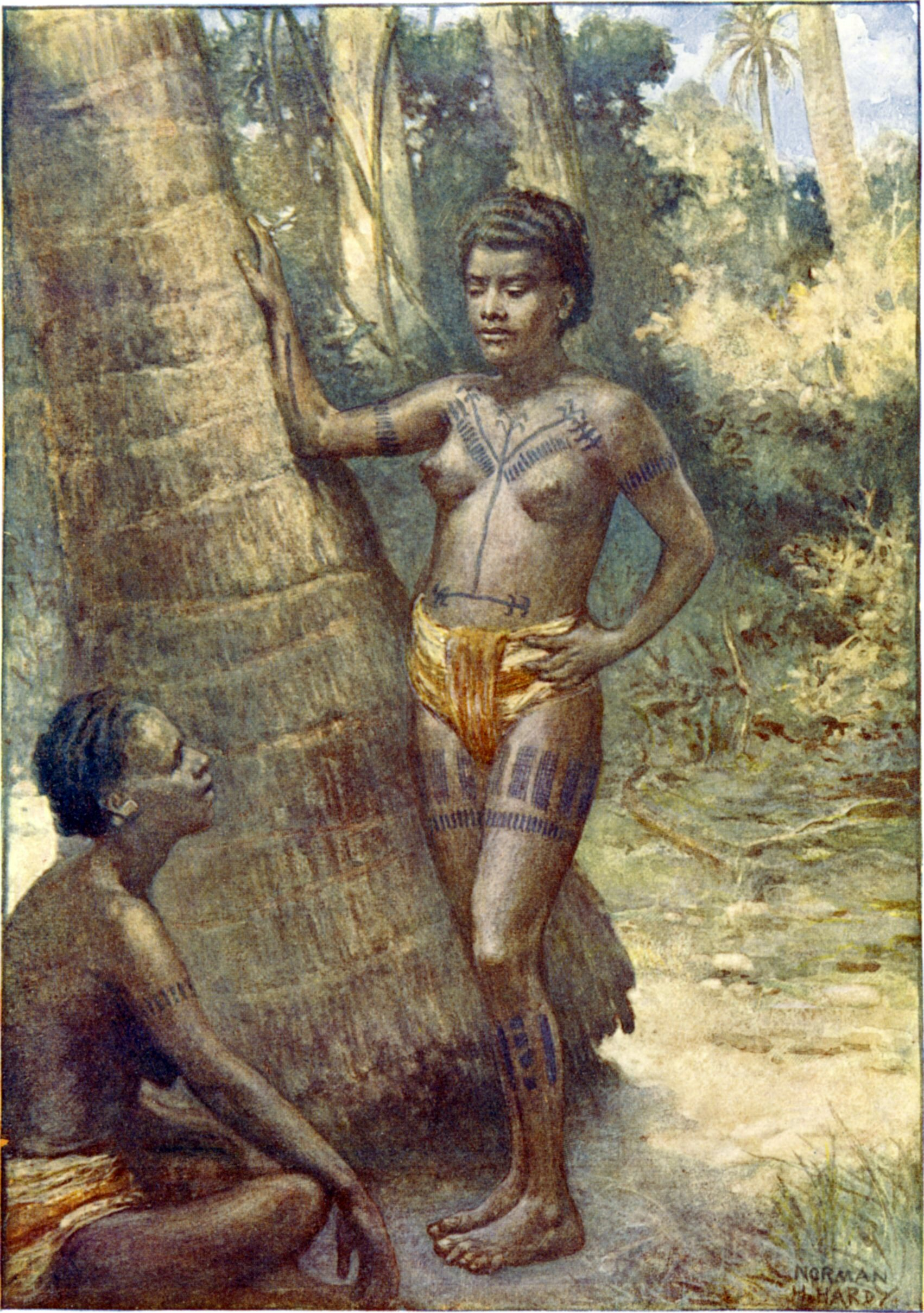
Tattooed women of Rennell Island, 1911.

Due to the tropical climate and thinly soiled coralline substrate, sheep and cattle do not thrive here. Villagers wishing to harvest seafood have the arduous task of climbing the surrounding 120–150 metres (390–490 feet) cliffs for the return journey to the coast. Once at the coast, they are bound to harvest only finned and scaled seafood, not shellfish, lobsters or other marine creatures. The serious deficiency in diet prompted the Solomon Islands government to seed Lake Tegano with tilapia fish. These seem to have thrived in the brackish conditions and are now a staple part of the diet.

The locals also talk about a condition they refer to as "The Cold". They believe that this ailment is responsible for the onset of a debilitating mental illness. Adults who have no history of mental illnesses or drug abuse have been known to slide into a state of melancholy, requiring weeks of intensive treatment.

The wantok system creates huge pressures on the people of Renbel, more so than many other provinces. You will often hear the locals remark "Oh, that’s the Avaiki way". This refers to the intrinsic behaviour associated with the wantok system and translates to "What is yours, is mine"

The locals play sport most days of the week in the afternoons. Soccer, rugby, volleyball & netball are the sports of choice.

The natives call Rennell "MUGAVA" and they call Bellona "MUNGIKI". They then combine the last three letters of each Island and come up with a word called AVAIKI. They have a Rugby and Netball team called Avaiki.

The locals do not have much respect for chiefs but most respect the Church leaders.

When an outsider enters a village there appears to be no apparent hierarchy and it is acceptable to talk to either men or women. The people who hold important jobs here are the religious leaders and teachers. The chiefs are not really respected here and are said to wield no real power. This view of chiefs as powerless is sparked by grandchildren of the commoners, who are well educated these days and want to retaliate against the traditional views held by their ancestors.

== Provincial government ==
The second island that makes up Renbel province is Bellona Island (pop. under 1000) thereby giving rise to the provincial name REN-BEL.

The Renbel province covers a land area of 840 square kilometres (320 mi^{2}). The province or Renbell was established in 1993 where it was revealed that 99% of the land is customarily owned with only the main road and Bellona airfield being owned by the government.

Tigoa (Tingoa) is the capital for Rennell Island and located at the Rennell Airfield. It is referred by the locals as TNT and has a population of about 400 people. A number of residences are built either side of the airfield. Both the Royal Solomon Island Police and the Provincial Government offices are stationed at Tigoa.

The traditional chief system does not operate in the province.

The Provincial Government are tasked with providing health, education, transport, power, water and other basic services. They are funded with about $128,000 per month from the Central Government to do this.

The Government structure has 10 wards each with elected members:

Rennell Ward

- Ward 1 – Hutuna, Tegano
- Ward 2 – Niupani, Tebaitahe, East Lake
- Ward 3 – Lughu, Avatai
- Ward 4 – Teabamagu, Kanava, Tahanuku
- Ward 5 – Ngogona, Tingoa (TNT), Moreno & Hatagua (Airfield Area)
- Ward 6 – Kaagua, Tepogima

Bellona Ward

- Ward 7 – Matangi
- Ward 8 – East Ghongau
- Ward 9 – West Ghongau
- Ward 10 –Sa’aiho

The Provincial Government is also responsible for the appointment of area constables to police local by-laws.

== Agriculture ==
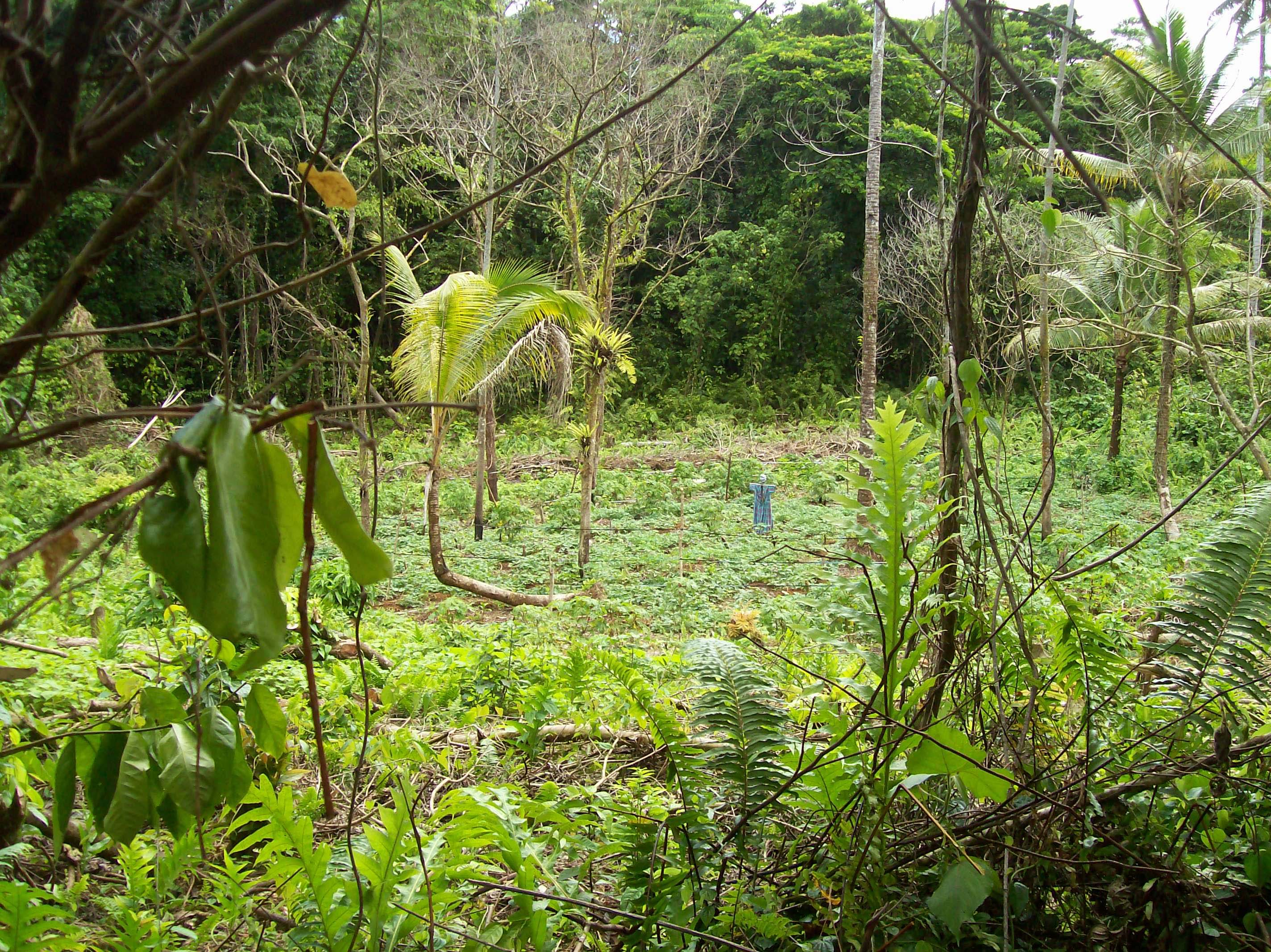
Typical farming plot. Note the scarecrow to scare pūkeko. Taken 2008

In Renbell province, a great majority of land disputes are over farming plots. Many villages are used as gardening villages (subsistence farming) since the population has moved to larger neighboring villages. The farming plots are carved out of the forest and farming paths carved to reach the plots. The soil from a coral atoll is not as fertile as other islands such as the volcanic Guadalcanal. Often the boundaries of these plots are guessed which gives rise to the various disputes.

The crops grown include sweet potato and slippery cabbage and to a lesser extent, taro. In the 1990s a virus decimated the taro crops and now crops are under threat by a more natural enemy. At the arrival of RAMSI in 2004, all Solomon Islanders were encouraged to hand-in their firearms following the period of ethnic tensions and many farmers who had used guns to protect their crops were also required to surrender their guns. In 2008 many farmers now complain that the native bird tekagae, kagae or rednose (in New Zealand it is known as the swamp hen or pūkeko) "has tripled in population since the gun amnesty". Apparently the Tekagae can't be eaten and is very clever, being able to sense the arrival of a person and counteract any efforts of deterrence such as scarecrows or ribbons and "many families have gone hungry and many farmers have given up trying to farm and we appeal to RAMSI to seriously consider appropriate action".

== Forestry and mining ==
Extensive logging has occurred in West Rennell. Bauxite ore is also mined in West Rennell. On 5 February 2019, when Cyclone Oma passed over the island, MV Solomon Trader a bulk bauxite ore carrier, ran aground on Kongobainiu reef. It spilled 300 tonnes of oil into the bay and damaged more than 10 km^{2} (3.9 mi^{2}) of reef and more than 4 km^{2} (1.5 mi^{2}) of lagoon habitat. In February 2025 litigation was commenced by the people of Rennell Island and the Solomon Islands Government against the five companies responsible for the accident.

5,000 tonnes of bauxite were spilled into the bay in July 2019. By 2021, over half of the impacted areas had not been rehabilitated.

== Demographics ==
The people of the Rennell Province have a subsistence farming lifestyle. Their daily activities are focused on farming of the family's personal garden and regular attendance at churches.

The majority of residents of the Renbell province are Renbellanise of Polynesian descent. The Rennell and Bellona languages are very similar and closely related to New Zealand Maori and Samoan languages. Most adults speak Solomon Pijin, although children and some unschooled young persons will only be comfortable speaking Renbelian (Polynesian language), and most have some understanding of English.

== Police services ==
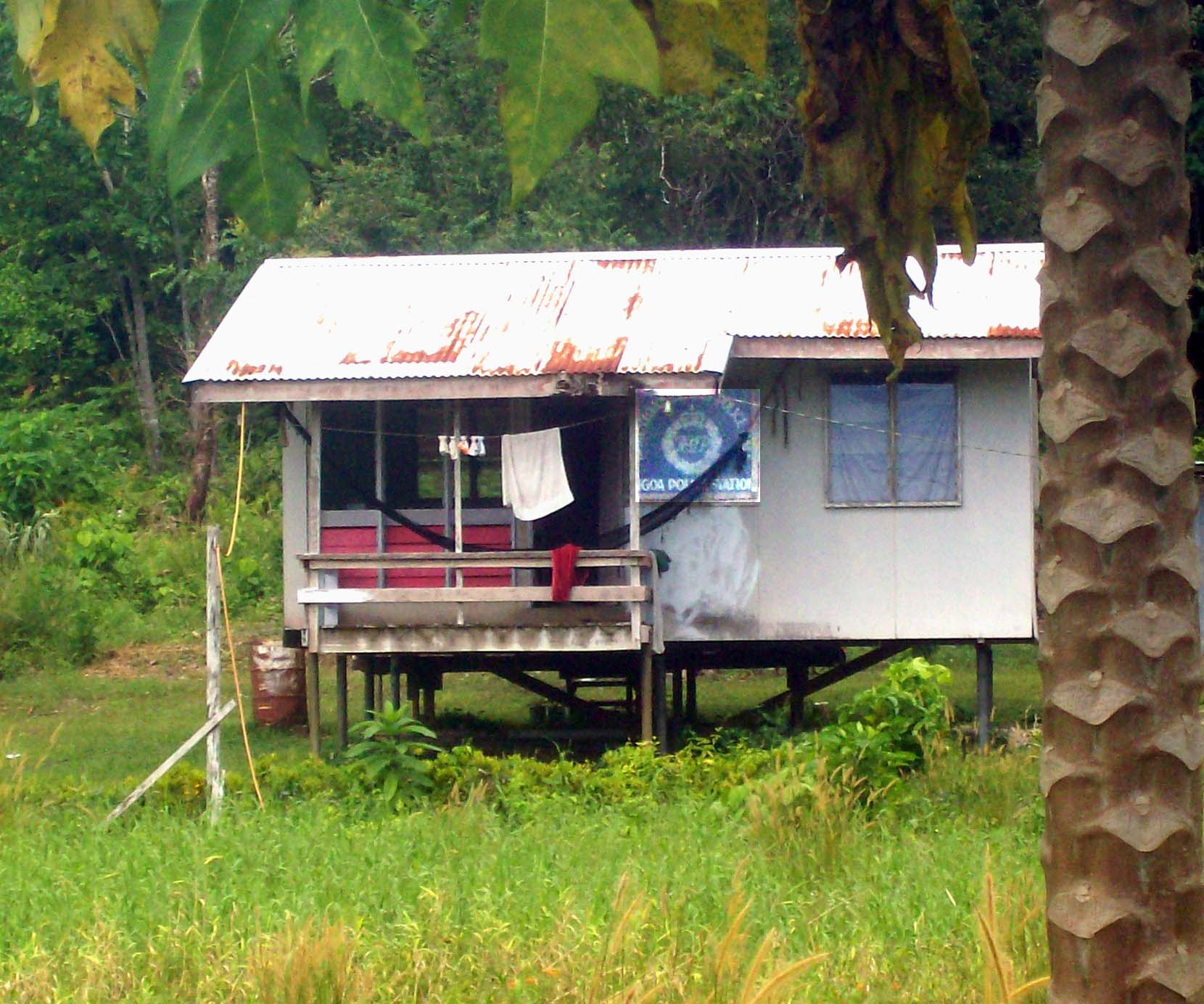
The now condemned old Tigoa police station. Used as a residence. Taken 2008

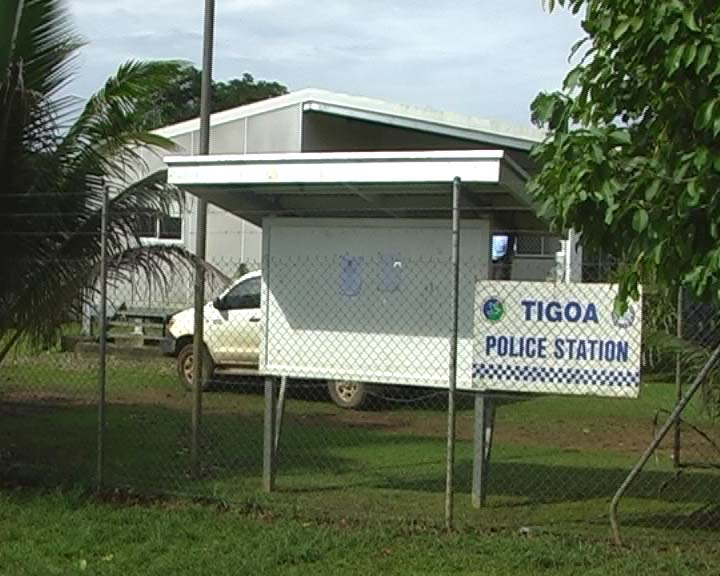
The RAMSI built accommodation and police station section (left). Taken 2008

Both the islands of Rennell and Bellona are serviced by the Tigoa police station. The gazetted strength of the police station is meant to be 12.

As of September 2008, the actual strength is 5.

The Tigoa Police station was originally built in 1993 and soon after was destroyed by Cyclone Nina. The replacement police station was condemned by the Royal Solomon Islands Police (RSIP) logistics department in 2008.

As part of RAMSI, there are two Participating Police Force (PPF) advisors stationed at Rennell Island, Tigoa. A semi-permanent ITSA structure provides accommodation which was officially opened by the RAMSI PPF Commander on 8 September 2004 and later a section which accommodates the Tigoa police station, was opened on 12 March 2008.

Power to the complex is provided by a 24-hour Kubota generator powering a split system Air-Conditioning, hot water, full kitchen appliances and washing facilities in the laundry/Bathroom. The accommodation/Office houses the HF radio, base sat phone and computer equipment used by PPF members.

The RSIP residences are situated at the back of the PPF Compound including the previously condemned police station. There are 5 current houses standing and most have nil wet areas or ablution facilities available. Some of these facilities have been built by RSIP officers themselves as there is no maintenance work conducted by RSIP management.

RSIP hold a sea worthy fibreglass banana boat which is used for transport on Lake Tegano with a modern and well maintained 25HP OBM. This is an efficient and functional means of transport for RAMSI/RSIP between the head road and the 4 lake villages of East Rennell Island. Currently the Marine fuel for these patrols is provided by RSIP so patrols of Rennell can be completed. They also have a banana boat station at Lavangu which is seaworthy and operates with a 40HP Yamaha O/B. Both O/Bs are stored at the PPF compound in the RSIP container with servicing and parts for the boats and OBMs supplied by the RSIP.

A modified shipping container is utilised as a cell/watch-house until the offender is evacuated to Honiara.

In 1992 a Tigoa police officer with 4 passengers was sailing from Rennell to Bellona in a banana boat and did not return. No bodies were ever recovered yet the following year in January 1993, the banana boat was located during or after Cyclone Nina. It was located in the western province area, near Gizo.

== Crime ==
The level of crime is generally very low with land disputes and homebrew being the main cause behind offences committed. Often disputes involve logging and farming plots.

Since June 2006, there have been very few drunk and disorderly incidents reported to the police. This is primarily due to the lack of sugar and yeast on the island which is required to make home brew. There is generally a surge in home brewing activity following the arrival of the resupply ship. Local home brew is made by fermenting coconut milk, yeast and sugar in a bin and leaving it hidden in the bush for about a week. It is normally drunk on Thursday night after sports day which often leads to disorderly behavior such as fights, noise, loud music, etc.

== Religions ==
The religion of Bellona Island (and presumably Rennell Island) was replaced by Christianity in 1938. The Copenhagen University funded research to examine the rituals of Bellona Island which indicated that many men recalled the story that the island began as a Nerita shell and rose up from the ocean (p24).

In present time the people of Rennell are geographically divided between the lower lake end and the higher end by two Christian denominations. Around the eastern end, Te Nggano, the people follow the South Seas Evangelical Church, with the Seventh-day Adventist Church occupying the western end. The Seventh-day Adventists worship on Saturday, and South Seas Evangelical Church (SSEC) worship on Sunday. Church Leaders play a small part in most communities, and the traditional chief/elder system is becoming defunct.

Portions of the population do not actively attend church, especially young people, though most "community leaders", are nominated as teachers, elders, chiefs or pastors.

- Seventh-day Adventist Church (SDA) – major
- South Seas Evangelical Church (SSEC) – major
- Anglican Church – minor
- Life Changing Mission (LCM) – minor

== Medical ==
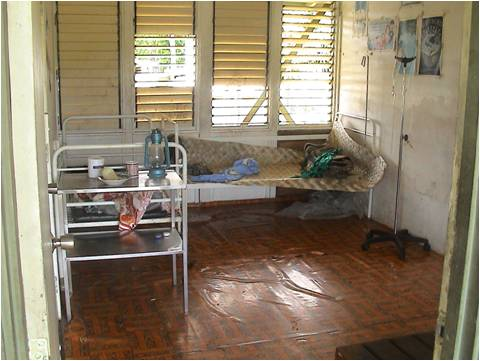
Medical clinic, Tigoa. Taken 2008

There are two medical clinics currently staffed on Rennell Island. They are located in the Tigoa and Tegano villages on Lake Tegano.

The standard of medical care available in the clinics is very basic. Most serious cases are referred to Central Hospital Honiara, for further consultation. Generally the patient is transported on the next scheduled air flight although in emergency cases, the RAMSI aircraft is used.

Malaria is a serious health risk in the Solomon Islands, Vanuatu, and Papua New Guinea but Renbel province is the only area where malaria is not a problem.

Bellona Island also has one medical clinic.

== Education ==
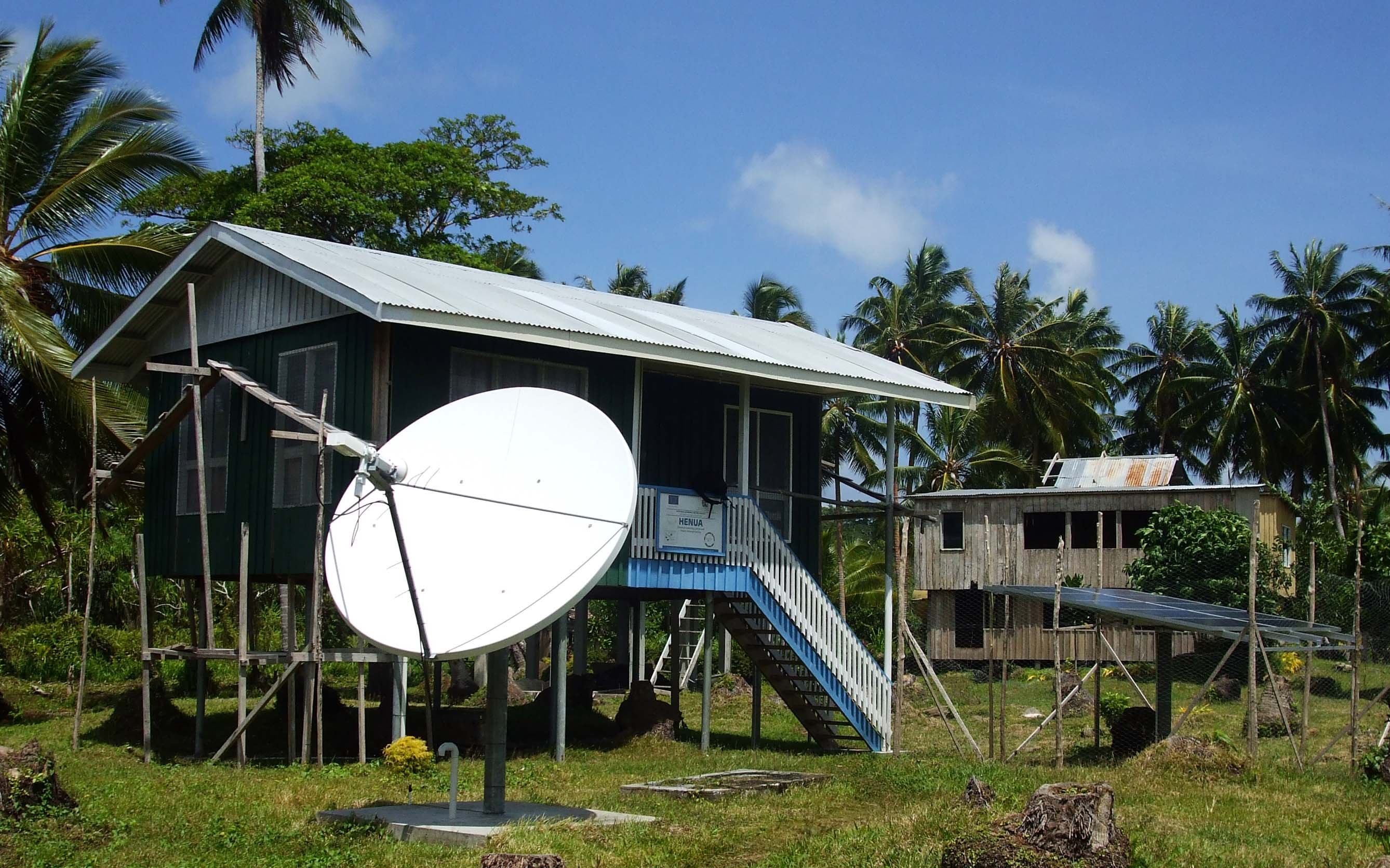
Henua pFNet Internet café. Taken 2008

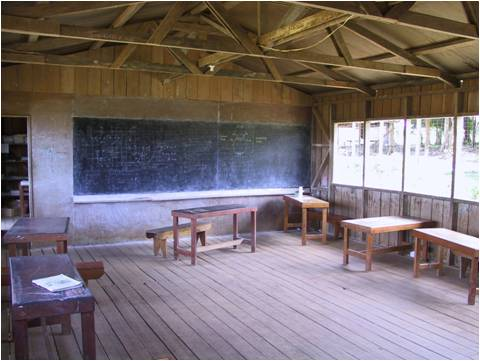
Local TNT school building. Taken 2008

There are schools in all of the main villages and a Bible college which conducts courses on vehicle maintenance, cooking, construction and general living courses. It is estimated that the ratio of students is 80% boys and 20% girls with various reasons identified such as costs, tradition and family home duties.

Henua Community High School is situated in Niupani village, next to the World Heritage site of East Rennell. Nearby Hutuna village is the site of the eighth People First Network email station, which was established in 2003. Hutuna was one of the sites which was included in the 2004 JICA-USP research on the impacts of the ICT on rural development.

=== Primary schools ===
East Rennell

- Moah School Hutuna / Tenqano Village
- Niupani Primary School Niupani
- Vaitahe Primary School Vaitahe Village

West Rennell

- Thomas Sandwich School Avatai Settlement
- Vanua Primary School Lavangu
- Kanava Primary School Kanava
- Tahanuku Primary School Tahanuku
- Newplace Primary School TNT Chistnick
- Kaagua Primary School Kaagua

=== Community high schools ===
East Rennell

- Niupani Community High Niupani

West Rennell

- New Place Provincial Secondary School (NPPSS).

== Communications ==
Telephone and internet service is provided from two 3G-capable towers operated by Our Telekom.

The TTV television network, which covers much of the Solomon Islands, does not broadcast over the air to Rennell.

Since 2003, the People First Network (PFNet) has operated an email station in Hutuna; this station was originally operated on VHF wavelengths. In Niupani, a school opened in 2007 that partnered with the One Laptop per Child project, providing internet access to students.

Shortwave radios and satellite phones are used by some residents.

== Utilities ==
There are about 20 serviceable generators on the island at time of report. These generators are mostly reliable; however use is restricted due to cost and difficulty in obtaining fuel. HF radios are powered by solar panel. No power grid is in existence. There are HF radios in each village and contact can be made through these in Rennell and Bellona.

Limited fresh water is available at local springs if rain does not fill the water tanks. One washing water bore is in the general vicinity of Tingoa Police station.

Rennell Island has 8 informally run stores. In the limited times that supplies are available for sale they will be limited to tinned tuna, rice and a very small range of supplementary items. There are 3 similar stores at Bellona.

== Transport ==
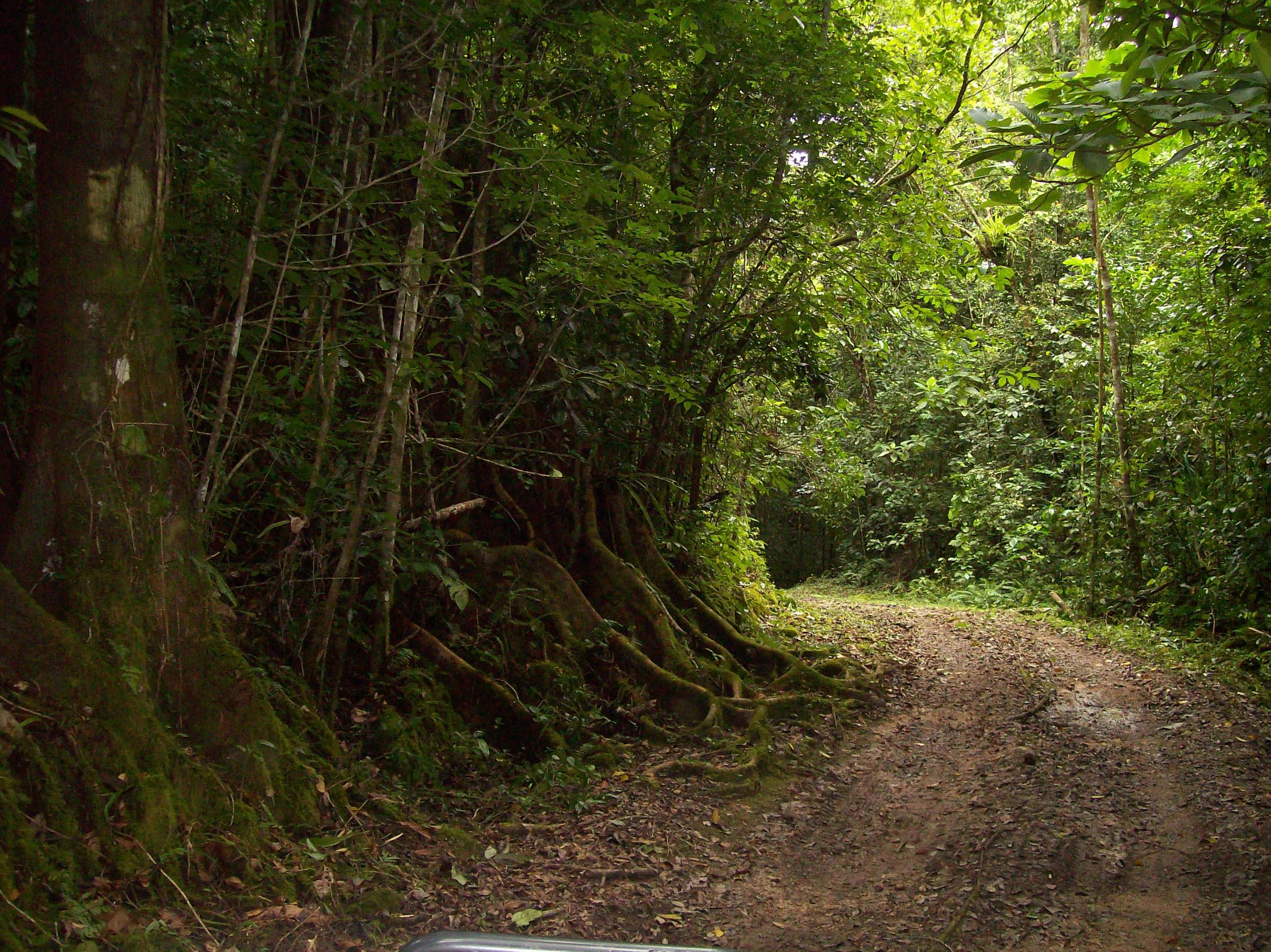
Coral road to Lavungu. Taken 2008

One packed-coral road runs down the centre of Rennell Island, but is in terrible repair, and "high" speed on the better sections should not exceed 35 kilometres per hour (22 miles per hour). As of September 2008 there were about 19 operational motor vehicles (trucks & 4WDs), a red tractor and 8 motor cycles on the island and a few pushbikes.

The only public transport on the Island is the Blue Truck owned by the Minister for Transport. The price to stand on the back of the truck from Lavangu to Tingoa is $20 to $60 Solomon dollars per person, which can be negotiated. The truck is often used to transport the sick or injured to the Tingoa Clinic for treatment or assessment while maintaining regular passenger stops. The cost to charter this truck is $1,000 Sol.

=== Shipping ===
The village of Lavangu on the central South coast has a channel passing through the reef to open water, and this is used by banana boats to transport cargo from ship to shore.

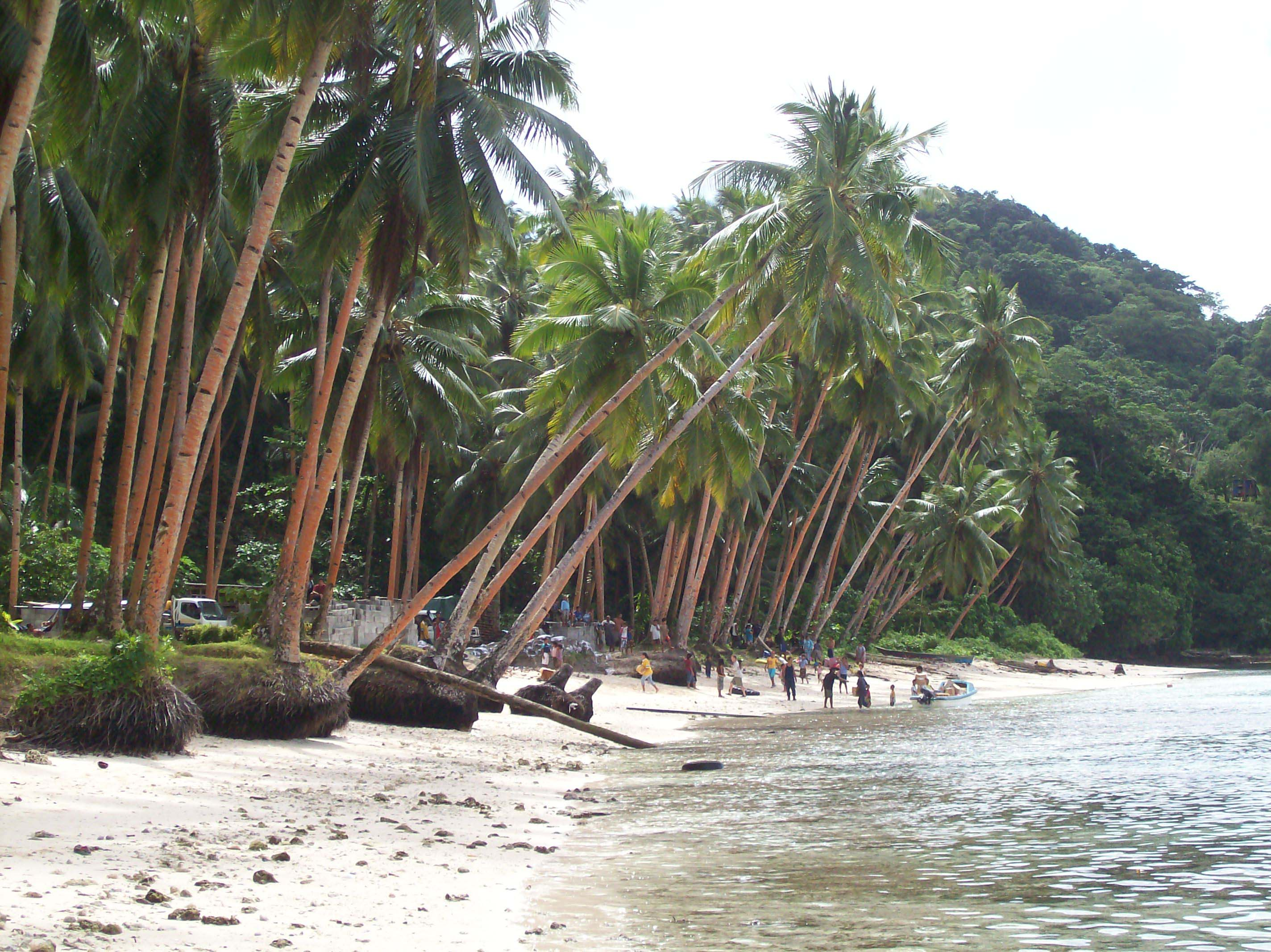
Long-awaited arrival of MV RENBEL. Taken September 2008

Lughughi Bay is located east of Tingoa. The port has a stone step that is used by landing craft to deposit heavy loads and vehicles onto the island. The road to Lughughi commences at the village of Tahanuka and is in a shocking state of repair, particularly the hill sections. The distance by road between Tahanuku & Lughughi is 7.5 kilometres (4.7 miles) which is about a 50-minute drive. There are a couple of copra sheds at the port with little else. The step where cargo is offloaded is often filled in spots with local rocks to make it passable. This port is in very poor state and is not maintained.

The province has a ship/barge called 'MV RENBEL'. The ship is multipurpose and currently transports passengers as well as cargo to Renbell on an irregular basis. The last ship to sail to Renbell was on 14 September 2008 and before that there was no service for 9 months. During the last few months the population survived mostly on coconuts and the occasional seafood with a total drought of the staple, rice.

Sea transport and vehicle transport are currently two of the main problems facing the Communities of Rennell and Bellona. The only other form of transport by sea is by fishing boats visiting the nearby reef. As a form of royalty to fish at the reef, these fishing boats transport goods and passengers.

=== Airport ===
One airfield is available on Rennell Island in Tigoa. It runs East to West at Tigoa. Bellona also has its own airstrip. Solomon Airlines provides a twice weekly service from Honiara – Bellona – Tigoa (Rennell Island) – Bellona – Honiara on Tuesdays and Fridays. A RAMSI flight arrives every Wednesday with either a staff changeover and/or supplies for the PPF.

Both islands have grass airstrips, but no other aviation infrastructure. The airstrip at Tigoa is maintained by Civil Aviation Division sub contractors and is mowed by manually slashing with brush knives. Often various communities volunteer to take on this role so they can utilize the money for events such as Christmas functions.

Generally flights leave Honiara at about 0700hrs and arrive in Rennell anywhere between 0800 and 0900hrs. Extra flights are scheduled sporadically. The flight agent resides at the Moreno Guesthouse, Tegiku (West Tigoa). On Bellona the Solair agents occupy a 2-storey building next to the aircraft "terminal".

RSIP provide security during landings and takeoffs for all aircraft; this involves using the Hilux, an RSIP motorbike and police cordon tape to erect a simple barrier to keep onlookers at a safe distance. It is apparent that flight days are a weekly highlight for many locals.

=== Airport land dispute ===
Correspondence addressed to the police and government on 16 March 2008 details a lengthy land dispute regarding the airport. In 1968 the Chief Priest and principal landowner of Tigoa land Mr Gilead Moa Tohahenua Gibauhenua Huaitebai allowed the construction of Tigoa airfield on his land.

During the construction process, apparently 26 graves were dug up and 1,200 coconut trees were destroyed. The author claims that the Baimango tribe of Mugihenua own the Tigoa land and the dispute is with the Ngatonga tribe. Ngatonga tribe owned and lived at Tigoa up until the arrival of Christianity. When the elders of the Ngatonga tribe died and their siblings left for studies in Honiara and overseas, outsiders namely Baimango tribe tried to claim the land referring to history without proof

== Villages & population ==
Village	Population	Ward	Coordinates
Tigoa	170	5	11°33′30″S 160°4′14.3″E
Kangua	60	6	11°31′01.9″S 160°0′41.1″E
Pogima	20	6	
Moreno	30	5	
Hatagua	250	5	11°31′01″S 160°07′05″E
Gongona	150	5	
Tahanuku	90	4	11°36′32″S 160°07′36.6″E
Kanava	80	4	
Teabamagu	70	4	
Lavungu	120	3	
Abatai	60	2	
Tebaieha Bible College	60	2	
Tebaitahe	200	2	
Niupani	250	2	
Tegano	120	1	
Hutuna	300	1	
Rennell	1830	1-6	11°49′0″S 160°10′0″E

Tigoa (colored background) is the provincial capital of the province of Rennell and Bellona. Wards 1 and 2 are East Rennel, and wards 3 through 6 West Rennel. Wards 7 through 10 of the province relate to Bellona Island.

== See also ==
- List of oil spills
- Rennell Sound, British Columbia, Canada
