= Tigoa =

Tigoa Tingoa
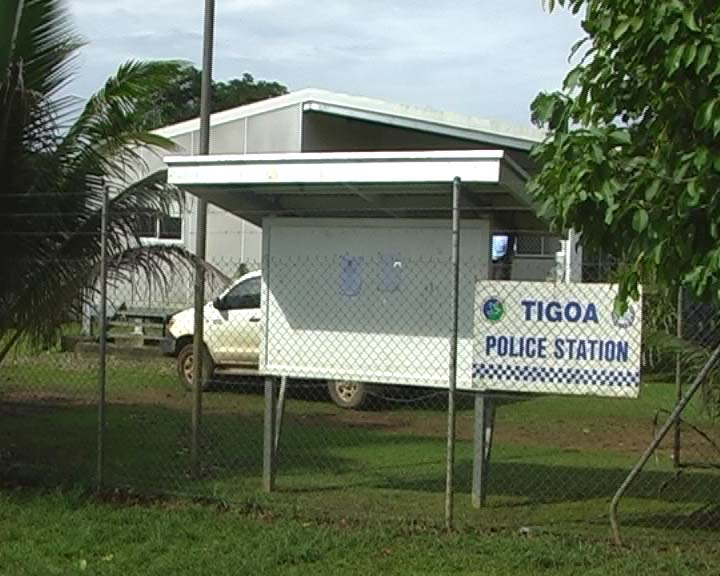
- Tigoa police station

- Location in Solomon Islands
- Coordinates: 11°33′30″S 160°4′14″E
- Country: Solomon Islands
- Province: Rennel-Bellona
- Island: Rennell Island
- Elevation: 18 m (59 ft)

Population (2019)
  - Total: 881
- Time zone: UTC+11 (UTC)
- Climate: Af

Tigoa (sometimes spelt Tingoa) is a village on Rennell Island, Solomon Islands. It is the administrative centre of Rennell and Bellona Province. It is located approximately 12-20 metres above sea level.

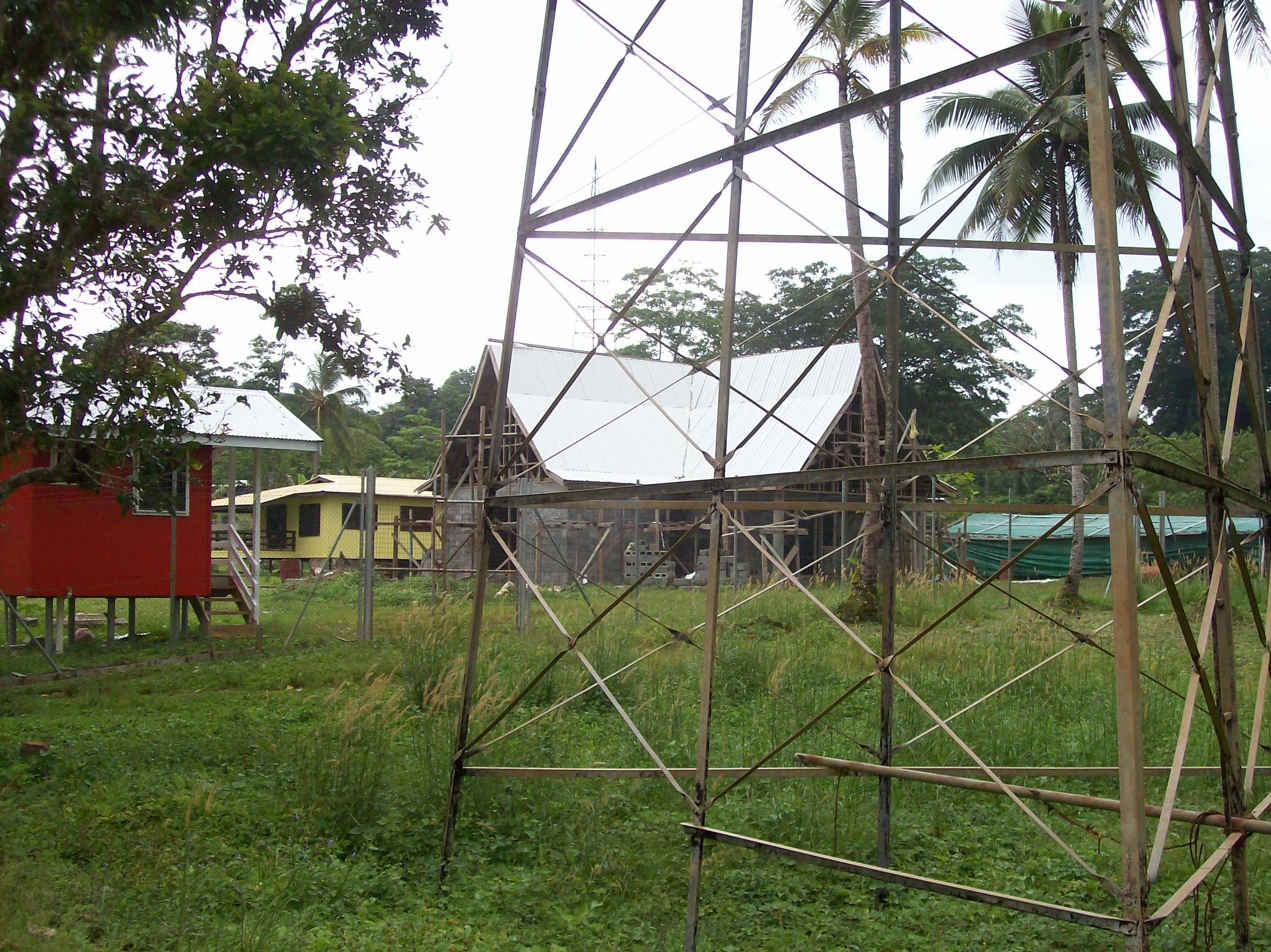
The soon-to-be-completed Telekom building to provide telephony to the island Taken 2008

== Airstrip ==
- Rennell/Tingoa Airport

== Population ==
As of 2019, there were 881 people living in Tigoa. There were 569 persons at the 2009 Census.

== Education ==
- Tupuaki Province Secondary School
- Tupuaki Primary School
