= Rennell and Bellona Province =

Rennell and Bellona Renel en Belona
- Province
- Flag

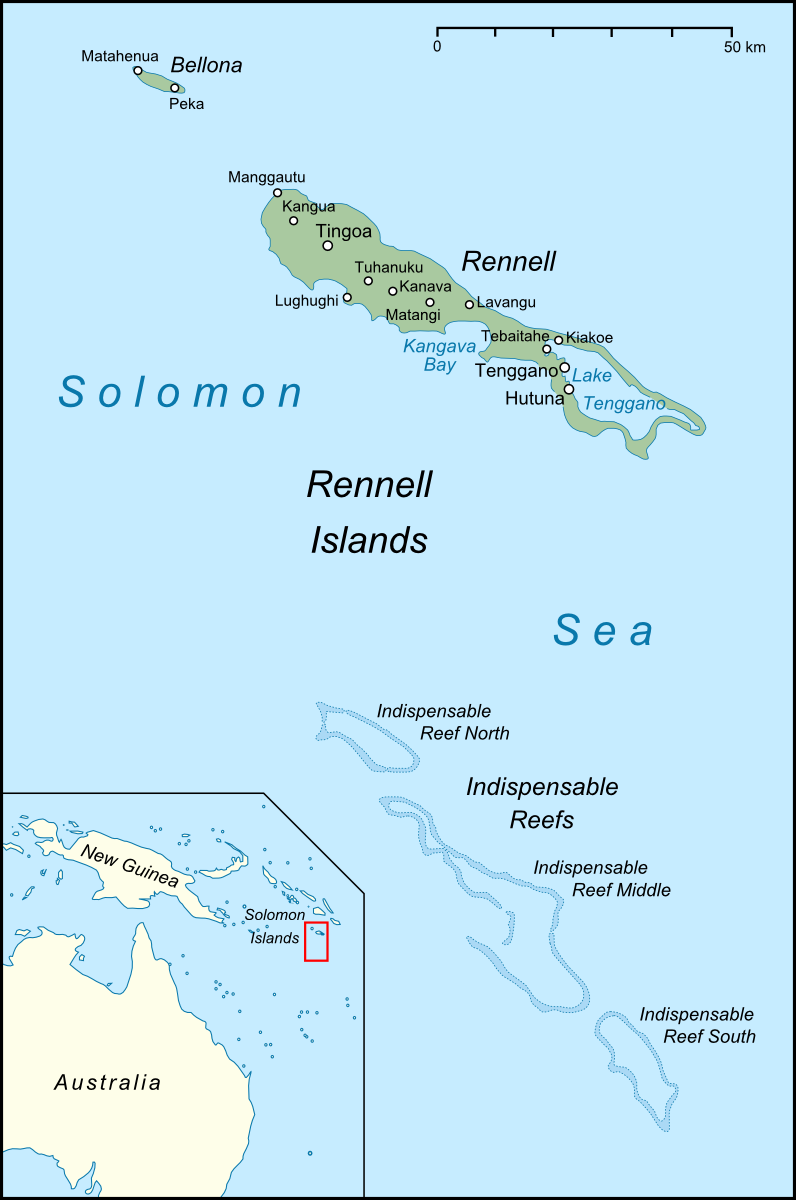

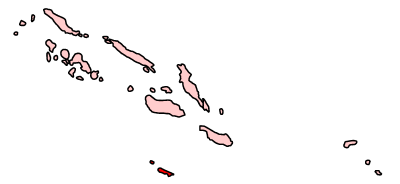
- Coordinates: 11°40′S 160°10′E
- Country: Solomon Islands
- Capital: Tigoa

Government
  - Premier: Hon. Derek Pongi

Area
  - Total: 671 km^{2} (259 sq mi)

Population (2019 census)
  - Total: 4,100
  - Density: 6.1/km^{2} (16/sq mi)
- Time zone: UTC+11 (+11)
- ISO 3166 code: SB-RB

Rennell and Bellona is one of the nine provinces of Solomon Islands, comprising two inhabited raised coral atolls, Rennell and Bellona, or Mu Gava and Mu Giki respectively in Rennellese (a Polynesian language), as well as the uninhabited Indispensable Reef. Rennell and Bellona are both Polynesian-inhabited islands within the predominantly Melanesian Solomons. They are thus considered Polynesian outliers. The first known European to sight the islands was Mathew Boyd of Camberwell, London, commander of the merchant ship, Bellona, in 1793. The province has a combined population of 4,100 as of 2019, the least populous province of Solomon Islands. The Samoic language of the islands is, in English texts, called Rennellese. The province's capital is Tigoa, on Rennell Island.

== History ==
In 1793, Bellona Island was named after a passing British ship, the Bellona. Rennell Island may have been named for the oceanographer James Rennell, FRS (1742–1830). In 1799, according to a chart, both islands were named Bellona Island. In 1816 the islands were referred to as Rennell's Isles.

The names the islanders used for self-reference are Mungiki (Bellona) and Mungava (Rennell), meaning 'small mountain' and 'large island' respectively (mu meaning 'island' or 'mountain', ngiki meaning 'small', and ngava meaning 'large'). Young people on both islands sometimes use the name Avaiki for both islands.

According to oral traditions, the islands were originally inhabited by a people of another culture before the ancestors of present-day Polynesians arrived in canoes from their homeland, ‘Uvea Gago (probably Ouvéa in the Loyalty Islands, New Caledonia). On their voyage, they arrived at ‘Uvea Matangi (probably East ‘Uvea, or Wallis Island, in Wallis and Futuna), and finally reached Rennell Island, where they found no inhabitants. They were told by a medium, Tahasi, that there was another island yet to be sighted and they left Rennell in search of it. They subsequently arrived at Bellona, where they found people, the Hiti, living in caves on the island near the shore. The Hiti were dark-skinned, short people with long hair reaching to their knees and spoke a language intelligible to the invaders, who gradually killed off the indigenous inhabitants. The oral traditions of Rennell and Bellona relate that the first invaders consisted of eight married couples who each founded a clan (sa’a), of which six became extinct. Ancestors of the two remaining clans, Iho and Kaitu’u, still inhabit the islands.

In oral traditions, narrators tell of scattered and singular voyages to and from other inhabited places in the Western Pacific. Just after settling, some men returned to East ‘Uvea (Wallis Island) to fetch precious turmeric root stocks that were used for ritual dyeing and anointment. In following generations two men went to Mungua (probably Woodlark Island, also known as Murua) and returned with place names and new kinds of yams and bananas. Another oral tradition details the arrival of a New Caledonian ship with tobacco and steel adzes. Other oral traditions state that poultry was brought to Rennell before the first Christian missionaries to the island were killed in 1910. In the latter part of the nineteenth century, Bellonese and Rennellese people were taken to Queensland by Blackbirders to work in the sugar plantations. One Rennellese man is known to have returned, bringing home with him Western goods such as axes, cotton cloth, umbrellas, and guns.

Initially, the two islands were contacted only sporadically by Europeans and Americans up to the later part of the nineteenth century. In 1910 the first three Christian missionaries were killed on Rennell, and the islands were left to themselves until preachers from the Seventh-day Adventists (SDA), the Church of England and the South Seas Evangelical Mission (SSEM) arrived in 1936. They took a group of Rennellese men to mission stations in other parts of Solomon Islands. In 1938, the Seventh Day Adventist Church became dominant on Rennell, followed by Bellona, which gradually converted all the inhabitants to Christianity. They destroyed all their heathen temples and built Christian churches all over the Islands.

Not until after World War II (1945) did Westernization slowly influence the two islands. A closer contact with the rest of Solomon Islands sped up the modernization process. More regular shipping was initiated, and children were sent to mission schools on other islands. In the 1950s health clinics and wireless contact were established on both islands. Regular air service to both islands was established in the beginning of the 1970s.

On July 7, 1978, Solomon Islands gained its independence from Great Britain, and Rennell and Bellona became part of the newly created country. About fifteen years later, Rennell and Bellona became a province of their own. At the turn of the millennium the different churches began losing their power, especially over the younger generation. Sports, music and home brewing became leisure-time interests, and education and vocational training rose in importance.

In 2005, there were reports that the people of Rennell and Bellona province were determined to secede from the country following a lack of infrastructure investment.

The history and linkage of the Rennellese people with the Māori are explored in a documentary entitled the "Mystery of the Lost Waka (canoe)", made by Māori Television in 2007.

== Provincial government ==
In 1993, Rennell and Bellona became a province of Solomon Islands, becoming the only Polynesian province in the predominantly Melanesian country. The province is also a single constituency, Rennell and Bellona Constituency, represented in parliament by a single Member of Parliament. Today, the current Member of Parliament for Rennell and Bellona is Hon. John Junior Tuhaika.

The provincial government is made up of 10 wards (provincial equivalent of a constituency) represented by 10 elected members known in the provincial assembly as Members of the Provincial Assembly (MPAs). Rennell Island, the larger of the two islands, has six wards and Bellona only has four, namely wards seven to ten.

=== Administrative divisions ===
Rennell and Bellona Province is sub-divided into the following constituencies (or electoral districts), which are further sub-divided into wards (with populations at the 2009 and 2019 Censuses respectively):

| Name | | Population (2009 census) | | | Population (2019 census) | | |
| Name | | Total | Male | Female | Total | Male | Female |
|---|---|---|---|---|---|---|---|
| 32a. – Rennell Island | | 2,032 | 1,067 | 965 | 2,548 | 1,417 | 1,131 |
| 32.a.01. | East Tenggano | 367 | 183 | 184 | 336 | 157 | 177 |
| 32.a.02. | West Tenggano | 378 | 199 | 179 | 375 | 178 | 197 |
| 32.a.03. | Lughu | 362 | 198 | 164 | 429 | 261 | 168 |
| 32.a.04. | Kanava | 239 | 135 | 104 | 308 | 174 | 134 |
| 32.a.05. | Te Tau Gangoto | 569 | 293 | 276 | 881 | 512 | 369 |
| 32.a.06. | Mugi Henua | 117 | 59 | 58 | 219 | 133 | 86 |
| 32.b. – Bellona Island | | 1,007 | 482 | 527 | 1,552 | 805 | 747 |
| 32b.07. | Matangi | 144 | 75 | 69 | 214 | 122 | 92 |
| 32b.08. | East Gaongau | 265 | 117 | 148 | 225 | 114 | 111 |
| 32b.09. | West Gaongau | 350 | 170 | 180 | 780 | 394 | 386 |
| 32b.10. | Sa'a Iho | 250 | 120 | 130 | 333 | 175 | 158 |
| Total | | 3,041 | 1,549 | 1,492 | 4,100 | 2,222 | 1,878 |

Note

- These figures changed every four years as more voters turned 18. The total number is not the total population of the Islands as they only take into account those eligible to vote in the National General Election and provincial elections.

== Geography ==
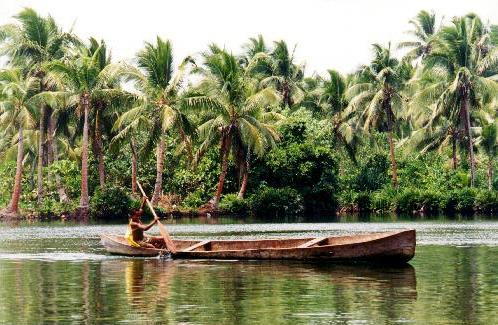
A dugout canoe on Lake Tegano

=== Climate ===
The islands are subject to tropical storms and cyclones, with the tropical cyclone season running from 1 November to 30 June. In recent history, substantial damage was caused by Cyclone Esau and Cyclone Nina in 1992, Cyclone Fergus in 1996, Cyclone Drena in 1997, Cyclone Beni in 2003, Cyclone Ului in 2010 and Cyclone Freda in 2012.

== See also ==
- Rennell Island
- Bellona Island
- Tautai Agikimu'a Kaitu'u
- Ajilon Jasper Nasiu
