= Tassafaronga Point =

Coordinates: 09°22′05″S 159°51′51″E

Missing is the now on the USS New Orleans one of the most decorated US ships in WWII and the USS Pensacola sunk Nov 30th 1942

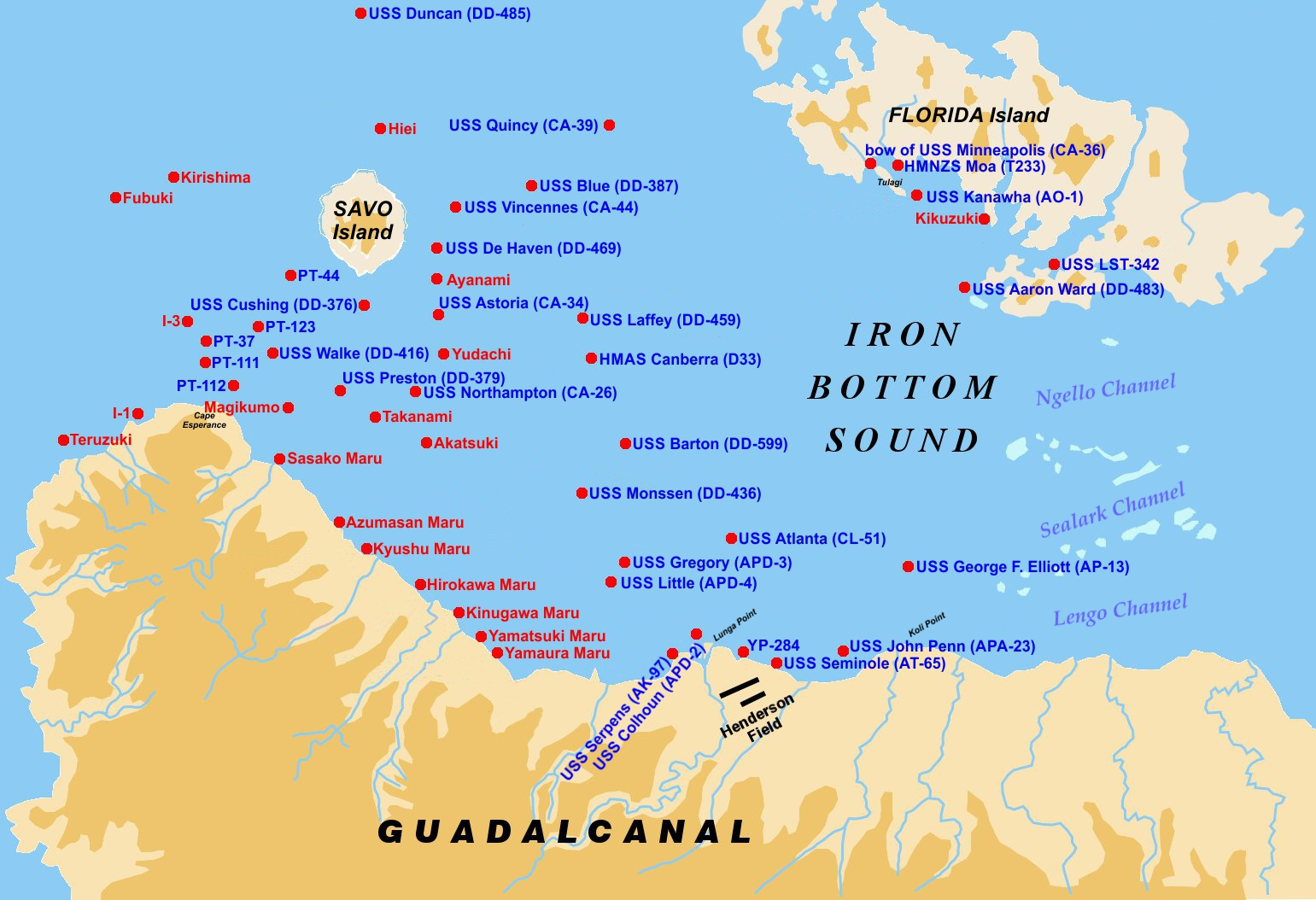
Chart of Ironbottom Sound and surrounding waters and islands, showing locations of ship sinkings.

Tassafaronga Point is a point on the north shore of Guadalcanal, Solomon Islands. The Battle of Tassafaronga, one of several naval engagements fought in the waters north of the island during the World War II Guadalcanal Campaign, took its name from this point.

Tassafaronga Point is generally northwest of Honiara. It is 1.5 miles southeast of the hamlet of Ruaniu and 4.3 miles northwest of the village of Tanaghai.
