= Squatting in Solomon Islands =

Solomon Islands circled on the globe

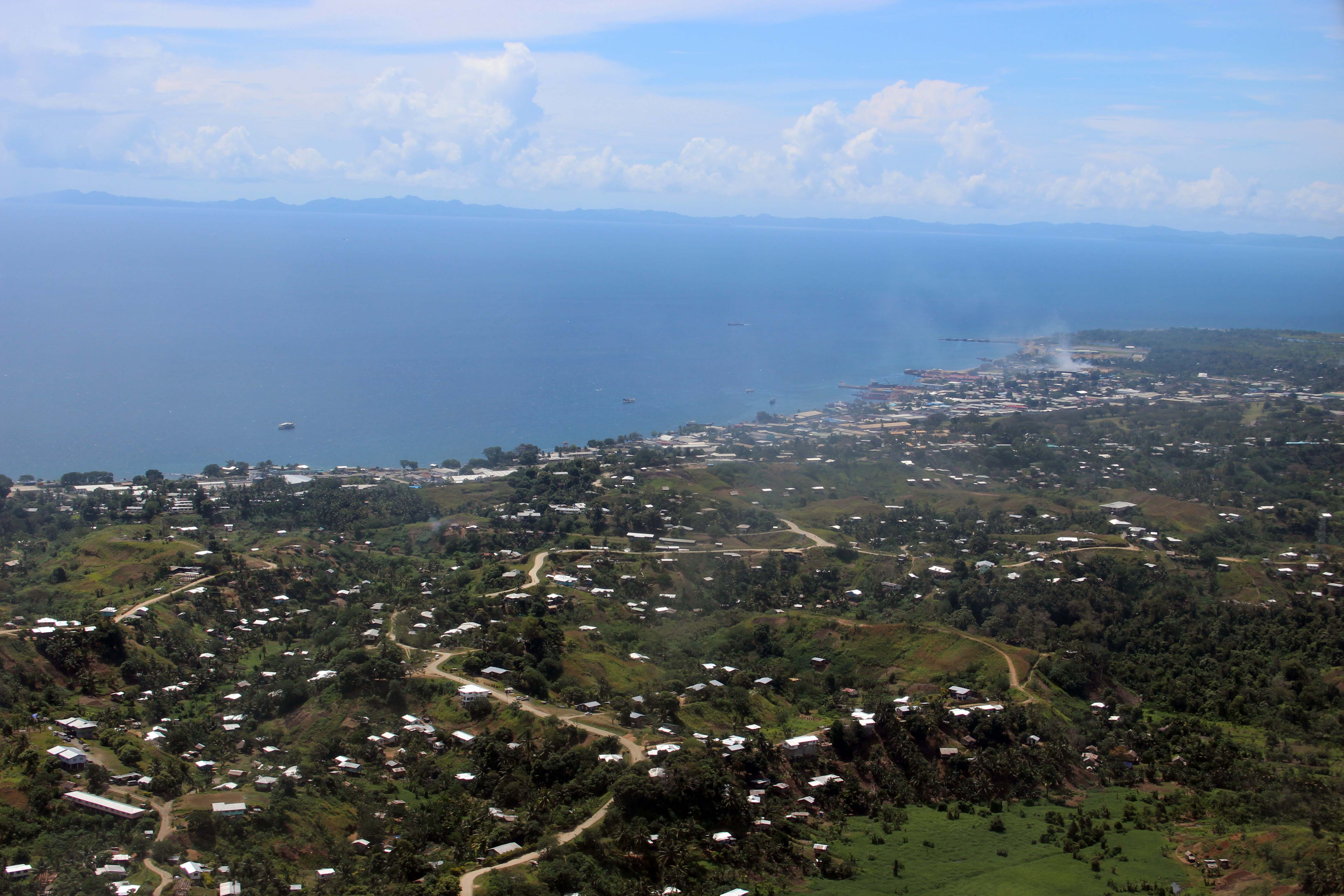
Aerial view of Honiara in 2013

Squatting on Solomon Islands occurs in informal settlements. The Ministry of Lands and Survey reported in 2006 that there were 17,000 squatters in the capital Honiara. Disputes over land use have generated tensions in recent years, particularly between 1998 and 2003.

== Land use ==
Solomon Islands is an island country in Oceania. The amount of land that is native or customary land is high: it was estimated by one report to be 97 per cent in 2005 and by another to be 87 per cent, in 2008. Squatting in the capital Honiara (on the island of Guadalcanal) began when it was founded after World War II. Migrants were attracted to the new capital by the prospects of education and employment, living in informal settlements. The government attempted to manage the housing issue by licensing land, but after the system broke down people began to squat instead. By 1987 there were 16 squatted villages with around 2,000 inhabitants. The Ministry of Lands and Survey reported in 2006 that there were 17,000 squatters. The settlements are constructed without a connection to electricity or sanitation, no roads and no drainage. A 2009 survey of over 200 squatter households stated that the main form of income was either unskilled labour or selling betel nuts and cigarettes. It studied four settlements: one near the centre of Honiara, one in West Honiara, one near Honiara International Airport and one where the Matanikau River meets the sea.

== Tensions ==
Ethnic tensions between islanders over land use came to a head in 1998, when youths on Guadalcanal attacked squatters from other islands such as Malaita. The conflict lasted until 2003. As a result of the tensions, displaced people set up new settlements for example at Burns Creek.

After troops supporting the Regional Assistance Mission to Solomon Islands were withdrawn in 2013, tensions around land surfaced the following year, with houses built by squatters from Rennell and Bellona Province being burnt out near to Honiara. When squatters from Honiara expanded onto land in Guadalcanal Province in 2016, warnings were again made about potential violence.

== See also ==
- Squatting in Fiji
- Squatting in Vanuatu
