= Chung Wah School =

School in Solomon Islands

- Emblem of the Chung Wah School, as printed on the school's uniforms. The school's name is written in English at the bottom, and in Chinese (traditional Chinese: 校學華中, using the right-to-left horizontal writing style, a particular form of vertical writing in traditional East Asian scripts) on top.

Location
- Chung Wah Road, PO Box 196, Honiara, Solomon Islands; 9°26′14″S 159°58′2.5″E

Information
- Type: Private
- Established: October 15, 1949
- School district: Chinatown
- Principal: As of 2024, Eunice Tahuniara
- Grades: Kindergarten to 6
- Colors: Emblem: Dark blue and yellow; Sports uniform: Red, with the school's names in black
- Newspaper: Liontales

Chung Wah School (traditional Chinese: 中華學校; wherein 中華 is an alternate formal name for China, and 學校 means school) is a school on Guadalcanal, in Honiara, the capital of Solomon Islands and the Guadalcanal Province. In 2010, the school had classes from preschool to grade six (usually when children reach the age of 12). Anne Thomas, a New Zealander, came to the school in 1990, taught the first grade (sometimes referred to as "Standard 1" locally) before becoming its principal (in 1992 or earlier).

The school was set up to educate students in Chinese language and culture. After about 2 decades without Chinese tutors, in 2013 the school was successful in the retention of Chinese teachers once more, from this time on to teach Mandarin whereas previously only Cantonese was taught. In 2014, the school had 3 Mandarin teachers: 2 from China and 1 from Taiwan. Mandarin was taught in both daily lessons, as well as during advanced after school "extra-curricular" classes. Extra-curricular classes (after school or during breaktime) in other subjects were usually referred to as "clubs", and ranged from business to sports, cooking and arts.

The school's Parents/Teachers Association (PTA) (cf. Donations and fundraising for the school – Related to school's activities), in 1995, was planning to establish the first intake of the Chung Wah Secondary School in January 1996.

== Administration ==
The Solomon Islands Chinese Association (founded in 1964 as a forum for the Chinese community on the Solomon Islands), sometimes abbreviated as SICA (not to be confounded with the equally abbreviated Solomon Islands Christian Association) and Chinese Association in short, has been described as running the school:

The Association runs its own school, which opens to the public, ranging from kindergarten to standard 6.

— SOLOMON ISLANDS: Report for the year 1976

The 1992 edition of the school's newspaper claims that, initially, the school was under the control of a "committee of notable members" of the Chinese Association. The association has been described as administering the school in a 2002 article and has acted as a spokesperson for the school in 2015. The association also entailed a Chinese teacher, in 2011.

The association has made various donations to the school, among which giving students Red envelope "lucky money" for Chinese New Year.

== History ==
=== 1940s–1960s ===
Soon after the war, Chinese settled along the Mataniko River in Honiara and established shops. In either 1950 or 1951 (the year of estimate is unclear), it was estimated that there were 195 Chinese & 10 other Asiatics living in the whole protectorate, when its total population was estimated to be 98,581. In a colonial report of the British Solomon Islands Protectorate, published by Her Majesty's Stationery Office, the Chinese seem generally characterized as tradesmen.

The school used to be described as a Chinese school for (Chinese) children in Honiara. Only Chinese students were accepted, to ensure full Chinese control.

The Solomon Islands Chinese Association claims the school started by a group of volunteers teaching children from the Chinese community in Honiara.

Quan Park Yee (19 November 1906 – 17 October 2006) gives the following account on the origins of the school:

One day in 1949, the Resident Commissioner came into my tailor's shop to order a new suit. He noticed a group of Chinese children playing in the street and asked why they weren't in school.

I told him that there was no school for them. He asked me to talk to the parents of the children to see if they were interested in building a school. I spoke to Lo See War and some other parents and then went back to tell the Resident Commissioner that they wanted a school very much.

The Resident Commissioner told the parents to ask the Public Works Department for timber and roofing iron. The benches and desks were made in a workshop by Woy Yiu and Leong Hang. The first Chinese Teacher, Mr. Wong Ting Fong, was joined by a Mrs Anderson who taught English.

The school started with 20 pupils of mixed age range who were charged [Solomon Islands pound] £1 (the equivalent of $15) per month school fees.

— Quan Park Yee

The old school building, which was situated on the Eastern side of Chinatown, was either destroyed or no longer functioning as a school building by 1992, since it is reported that it used to be located on the concrete area in front of the existing school. Early Chinese merchant traders were donors, and the building of the new school, also in Chinatown, was made possible by individual donations and fund-raising drives. The new school was established, organized and financed by Chinese residents and the Chinese community, and grew out of one classroom, built in the 1940s, and still in use.

The school was officially opened on Saturday 15 October 1949, by Acting Resident Commissioner of the Solomons (J. D. A. Germond). Up until then, there had been no formal education of Chinese children. After the ceremony, "European wellwishers" were entertained by Chinese residents at morning tea. On Monday 17 October 1949, 26 pupils, in new uniforms, started classes in the new building.

The school's first Chinese teacher, Wong Ting Fong, is said to be newly arrived from China in a 17 October 1949 article. All courses were taught in Chinese, except for English. A trained school teacher, V. Anderson (the wife of the Secretary to the Government), was the first to give English instruction and was recruited from the United Kingdom since, according to the school, the Solomon Islands "lacked the necessary trained manpower to teach English". In 1992, the school mentions that she revisited the school "in recent years". She joined Wong Ting Fong, who taught during the afternoon after morning sessions by V. Anderson.

The school was registered in August 1950. The school claims that, during the 1950s, the whole school was taught by 1 teacher only.

Some months before November 1952, at request of the Chinese residents for a teacher, the Bishop of Melanesia [Sydney Caulton], wrote to the Bishop of Hong Kong. Fung Shiu Kat was chosen, who in November 1952 or earlier arrived in the British Solomon Islands and joined the staff of the Melanesian Mission. This was the first undertaking of the [Melanesian] Mission among the Chinese of the British Solomon Islands. He taught 40 children of the Chinese residents of Honiara – ordinary school 6 hours per day and on Saturday mornings, and Sunday school on Sunday. The Chinese community paid his salary.

Augustine Quan Hong (arrived in 1924, went to Hong Kong after World War II, and returned to Solomon Islands in 1949), member of the Honiara Town Council, nephew of the first Chinese person who started a business on the Solomon Islands, and entrepreneur himself; helped to found the Chung Wah School.

=== 1970s–1980s ===
The school claims that, as its reputation grew, many non-Chinese wanted to enroll their children. The first intake of Solomon Islands students occurred either in the mid- or in the late 1970s, which made it necessary for the school to expand. New classrooms were added. Either some or all of the new classrooms feature plaques above their doors naming the donors who enabled their construction.

In the beginning, there were also no "locally" recruited teachers; later, when the school grew and more equipment and resources became available, some joined the staff. This should have happened in 1982 or earlier, since it is reported by the school in 1994 that a local teacher (who went to primary school in Auki and to secondary school in Malaita, before getting her teaching certificate at the Solomon Islands Teachers College) had then been teaching at the school for 12 years.

In the late 1980s, when the school reported an obvious need for more classrooms, Karen Chan (cf. Administration – Comptrollers) made an appeal to the Republic of China (Taiwan), with positive response resulting in the largest donation used to build 5 additional classrooms. Whilst some other shares of those donations were raised by the Chinese community in Honiara or came from students' parents or other individuals, the Taiwanese government injected SBD$31,540.77 (or ± 55% of the total amount donated to build these classrooms) via the Overseas Chinese Affairs Commission of the Republic of China (cf. Donations and fundraising for the school – Not related to school's activities).

=== 1990s–2000s ===
By November 1992, the school counted 12 classrooms for the grades ranging from "Standards 1 to 6", and 3 kindergarten classrooms. At this date, the school did not have a playing-field. The school reports in November 1992 that the newest buildings feature plaques above the doors stating the names of their donors.

A 1992 PhD thesis says the school, in special circumstances, accepts expatriate students.

Another doctoral dissertation from the same year characterizes its education as having a high standard and its pupils as pertaining to families who expect their children to achieve. A 1994 PhD thesis tagged the school as a high-cost private school (alongside Woodford International School), while categorizing Honiara's primary schools. By the Education Act in the 1996 edition of the Laws of Solomon Islands, the school students' annual fee was confined to be within the range of SBD$150–$500.

Since at least 1993, the school has its own tuck shop.

At 9:30AM, on 21 August 1995, the Māori queen, Te Arikinui Te Atairangikaahu (Dame Te Atairangikaahu) arrived at school. In the school's hall, she was welcomed musically by pan flute players. Eileen Barrett (the wife of the New Zealand High Commissioner to Solomon Islands Te Rongotoa "Tia" Barrett) accompanied the queen during her visit to the school. The pupils danced custom dances, and some of them wore custom Solomon Islands dresses. Gifts were exchanged; the queen gave a speech had morning tea with the staff, and watched classes at work.

In 1996, on multiple occasions, toddlers had to be removed from the kindergarten area, due to heavy rains in Honiara and drainage problems around the school. Therefor, construction workers dug deeper trenches around the preschool area and the assembly hall during months, which were almost complete by November 1996.

The Solomon Islands addendum of the initial reports of States parties due in 1997, monitored by the Committee on the Rights of the Child, states that corporal punishment in schools still occurs but is not allowed. Legal precedents were the Chung Wah School and "Baddeley".
