= Woodford International School =

Location
- Prince Philip Highway, Kukum, Honiara; Honiara; Solomon Islands
- Coordinates: 9.431892999999997°S 159.98721869999997°E

Information
- Type: Private
- Website: Wis.edu.sb

Woodford International School, also called the International School, is a school in Honiara, Solomon Islands; apart from the Honiara Solomon Islands College of Higher Education (SICHE), a university in Honiara; and the University of the South Pacific (USP) Solomon Islands Campus. The school is located just to the northwest of the Solomon Islands College of Higher Education.

== History ==
The school was founded in the mid-1950s with about a dozen students at the site of the NPF Building in Point Cruz. It was expanded under the Solomon Islands National Development Plan, in the 1970s, to introduce a "primary educational system offering a curriculum meeting international standards". This objective was proposed intending to invite financial input and expertise into the country.

Following independence in 1978 from British rule, the British aided the construction of new school buildings on the campus. The school has gone through name changes; it was called Honiara International School in September 1989 and renamed Woodford International School in the 1990s as a fully recognised independent education authority. Its management is governed by a legally constituted board of management of "parent governors" as a non-profit organisation with funds raised mostly from the school fees. The government of Solomon Islands is only involved in the form of a grant to the school. Since 2007, the management has started a programme of enhancing the building and other infrastructure facilities of the school to seek recognition as an "IB World School," and has redeveloped the hall as a gymnasium and built music rooms and improved cafeteria facilities.

Honiara has five private primary schools; expatriate families generally send their children to the Woodford International School. Schooling is available up to Grade 6, and curriculum followed conforms to that adopted by the schools in Queensland (Australia). As of 2011, the school has about 150 pupils on its roster of which about 50% are citizens of Solomon Islands.
