= Honiara Central Market =

Coordinates: 9°25′55″S 159°57′20″E

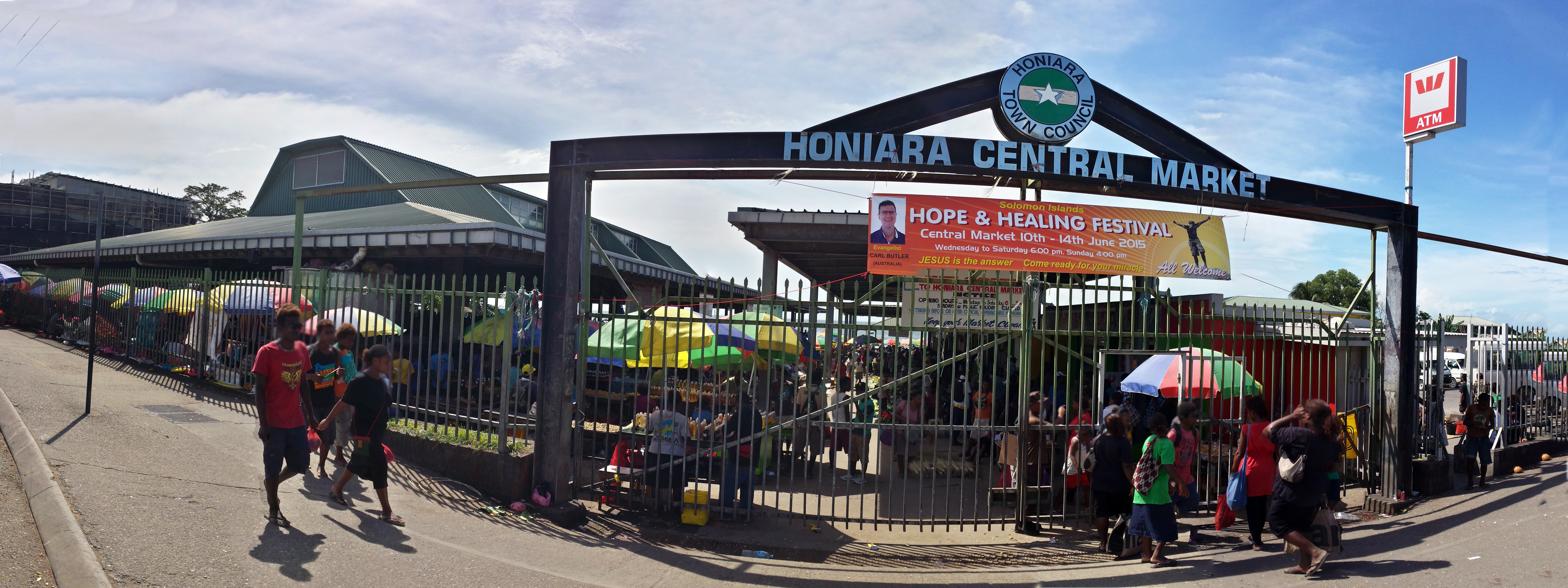
An overview of Honiara Central Market in June 2015, alongside Mendana Avenue in Honiara.

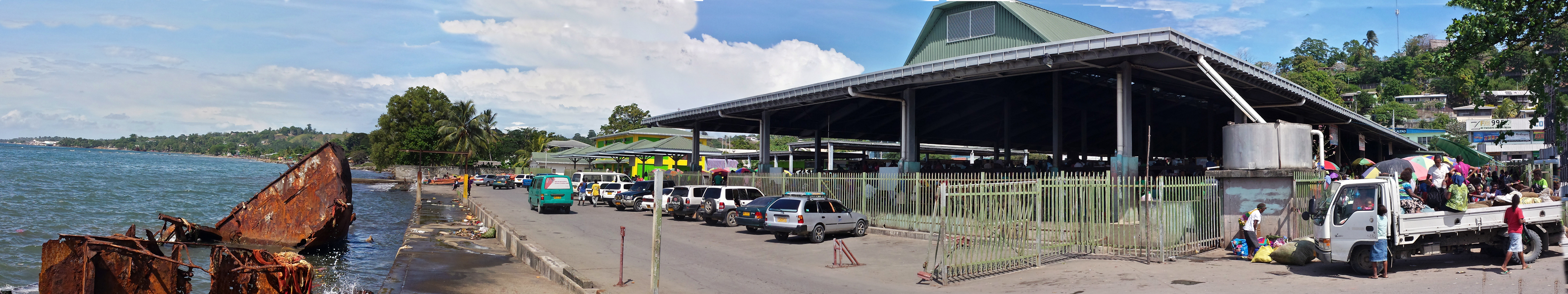
An overview of Honiara Central Market in June 2015, alongside Iron Bottom Sound in Honiara.

The Honiara Central Market (locally referred to as "Central Market") is a fish, flower, clothing, fruit and vegetable market (including fresh coconut water), which also sells shell money, and other local crafts such as palm-frond broomsticks, jewellery, coconut oil and hair tonics in Honiara, the capital of Solomon Islands; offering the largest fresh produce and fish outlets of the country. The market "dominates" the national internal trade, starting from early after its creation in the 1950s, and up until today.

It is one of the two markets owned and operated by the Honiara City Council (the other being the Kukum Market). For more information, cf. § Management.

The market has its own water frontage at Iron Bottom Sound, in order for boats to be pulled in. As such, fishermen can take their catches straight to the market via a boat ramp, seen as a significant symbol of how the freshness of fish is valued by Solomon Islanders.

Selling occurs both in the permanently covered building, as well as at its sides. The market offers the cheapest food in Honiara.

Some women migrate temporarily to Honiara to sell their products at the market. The market is seen as a meeting place for the diverse ethnic groups in Solomon Islands, and produce is transported there from across the whole country. Furthermore, it has been typified as an indication of the state of the country as a whole.

In 2006, the Honiara City Council allocated part of the market's space for the sale of a consistent range of flowers and pot plants all year round.

In 2014, there were around a thousand market vendors, of which 80% were estimated to be women. Males also help unloading and setting up market produce.

== Waste and pollution ==
The Honiara City Council is responsible for collecting waste from the market, which is composed of 94% compostable organic waste, and is dumped at Honiara's dumpsite "Ranadi Landfill".

On 9 December 2015, imagery of un-emptied rubbish bins at the street-side of the market hit a major local newspaper. Such images of bad waste management were first published on the popular private Facebook group "Forum Solomon Islands International (FSII)", where they triggered wide public criticism of the failure of business houses and the Honiara City Council to keep the city tidied.

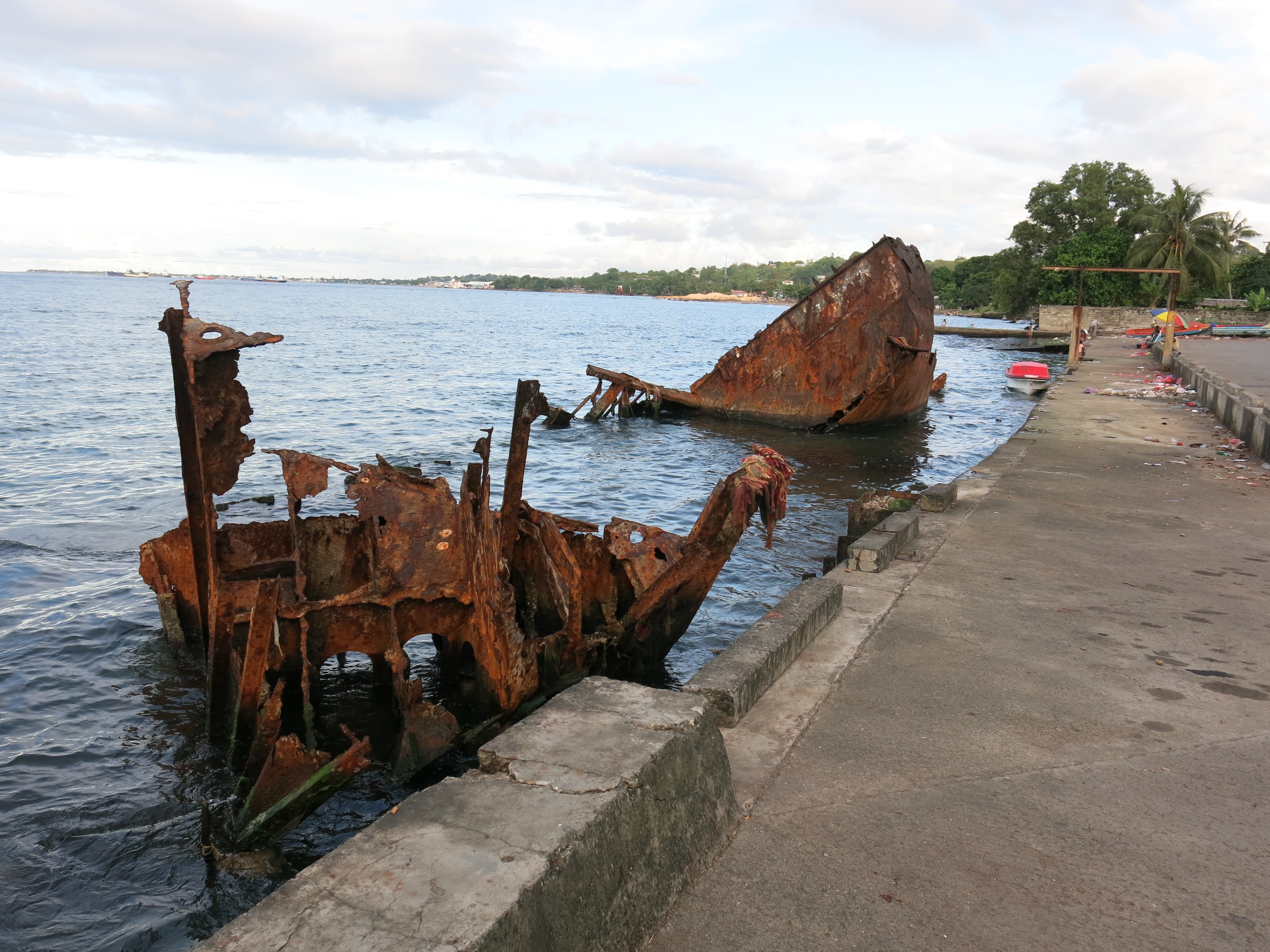
Sir Thomas Koh Chan's shipwreck (MV Yandina) at the market's boat ramp, in March 2016. One of the vessels of which market vendors have asked the immediate removal.

In January 2016, the head of the Solomon Islands Indigenous Peoples Human Rights Advocacy Association (SIIPHRAA), Moses Ramo said that the condition of the Central Market is unacceptable, referring to a failed waste management. Moses Ramo also insinuated that the uncleanliness is negative for tourism.

In March 2016, market vendors at the Central Market from at least five different provinces of Solomon Islands urged an immediate removal of the two shipwrecks at the market jetty, which have been lying there for multiple years. One of the shipwrecks (MV Yandina) is owned by businessman and former Minister Sir Thomas Koh Chan, the other one (MV Bikoi II) by Shortland Shipping Company. An individual had already pleaded for removal of the wreck "MV Bikoi II" in February 2016.

The Honiara City Council also warns vendors not to use the natural (sea) water source at the market:

Only wash your goods with fresh water. Do not use salt water near the market as this is polluted and will make people sick.

== Honiara Central Market Vendors’ Association ==
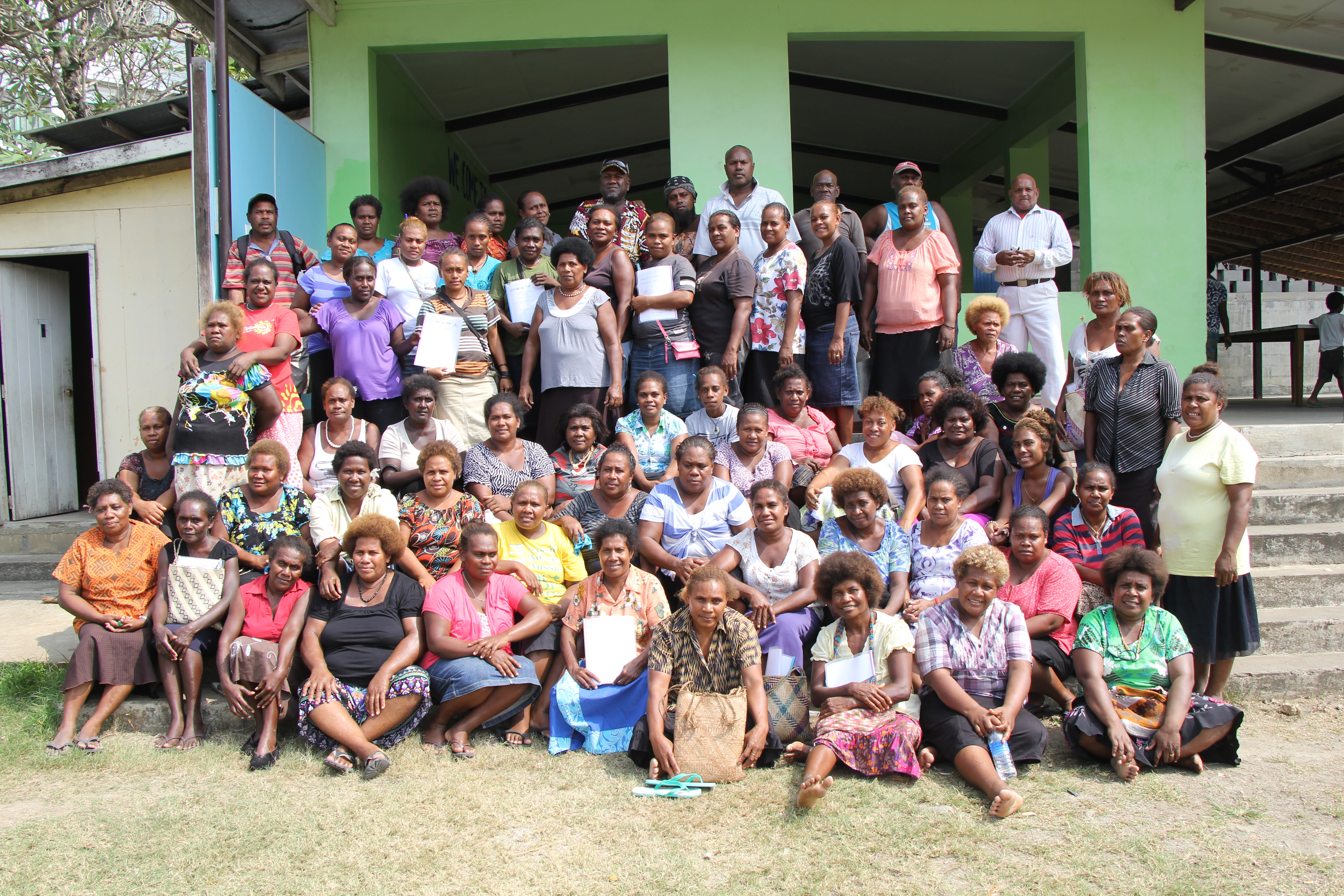
Market vendors during a workshop in 2014, part of initial workshops series by UN Women's Markets for Change (M4C) project, which formed the Honiara Central Market Vendors’ Association.

The Honiara Central Market Vendors’ Association (HCMVA) was opened and registered in 2014, followed by the registration of a market vendors' association in Auki in 2015. Both were registered under the Solomon Islands Charitable Trust Act. UN Women cooperates with market vendors and associations of both the Central Market, as well as with those of Auki Market.

HCMVA formed as a result of initial workshops series by UN Women's Markets for Change (M4C) project, which is funded for the largest part by the Australian Government.

== Crime ==
The country's "ethnic tensions" firstly sprung up at the market. During these tensions, in May 2000, a headless body of a Guadalcanese man was dumped at the market with a note on it linking the murder to ongoing peace talks and claiming that the Prime Minister would be the next one to die.

Approaching the end of 2007, the police reported to have arrested more than two hundred young men who sold kwaso (a type of illegal local homebrew) at the market.

In 2009, there were active student surveys of the sex trade involving market women and young girls from the Central Market. In 2014, fishermen, who were paid to transport girls to foreign fishing vessels outside the harbour of Honiara, described the Central Market as one of "the most evident or well-known pickup spots" for prostitution.

== Management ==
The market management is headed by a market manager, supervised by Honiara City Council's Finance Director.

In 2009, there were eight security guards (who, combined, cover the area day and night) and six full-time cleaners employed at the market; three further workers were in charge of the "ice house" (which features an ice maker, used for fish).

A market vendor receives a stall space when they are early enough to buy a ticket which allows one to rent one meter of stall space per separate vendor. Nevertheless, some people reserve their stall the night beforehand (for the fee cost of SI$17). Outside of the main space of the market, it is possible to reserve more stall space.

There exists different types of market fees depending on the kind of goods to be sold by a vendor. As of 2014, those market fees ranged from SI$13 (e.g. the "Crop Market Fee") to SI$31 (e.g. the price to store fish in an Esky). As of 2014, a parking fee costed SI$7.

The Honiara City Council raised a total of SI$782,000 and SI$1,705,000 for the years 2006 and 2008 respectively, due to the collection of market fees.

The Honiara City Council does not regulate prices of the products sold at Kukum Market and Honiara Central Market.

In 2009, it was stated that the increased use of the site had surpassed its capacity. The Honiara City Council reportedly planned to solve this problem by creating extra markets across the city which were to ease the traffic jams on Mendana Avenue at the Central Market.
