= University of the South Pacific Solomon Islands =

Satellite university campus in Honiara, Solomon Islands

Coordinates: 9°26′6.33″S 159°57′4.46″E

University of the South Pacific Solomon Islands, Honiara Campus
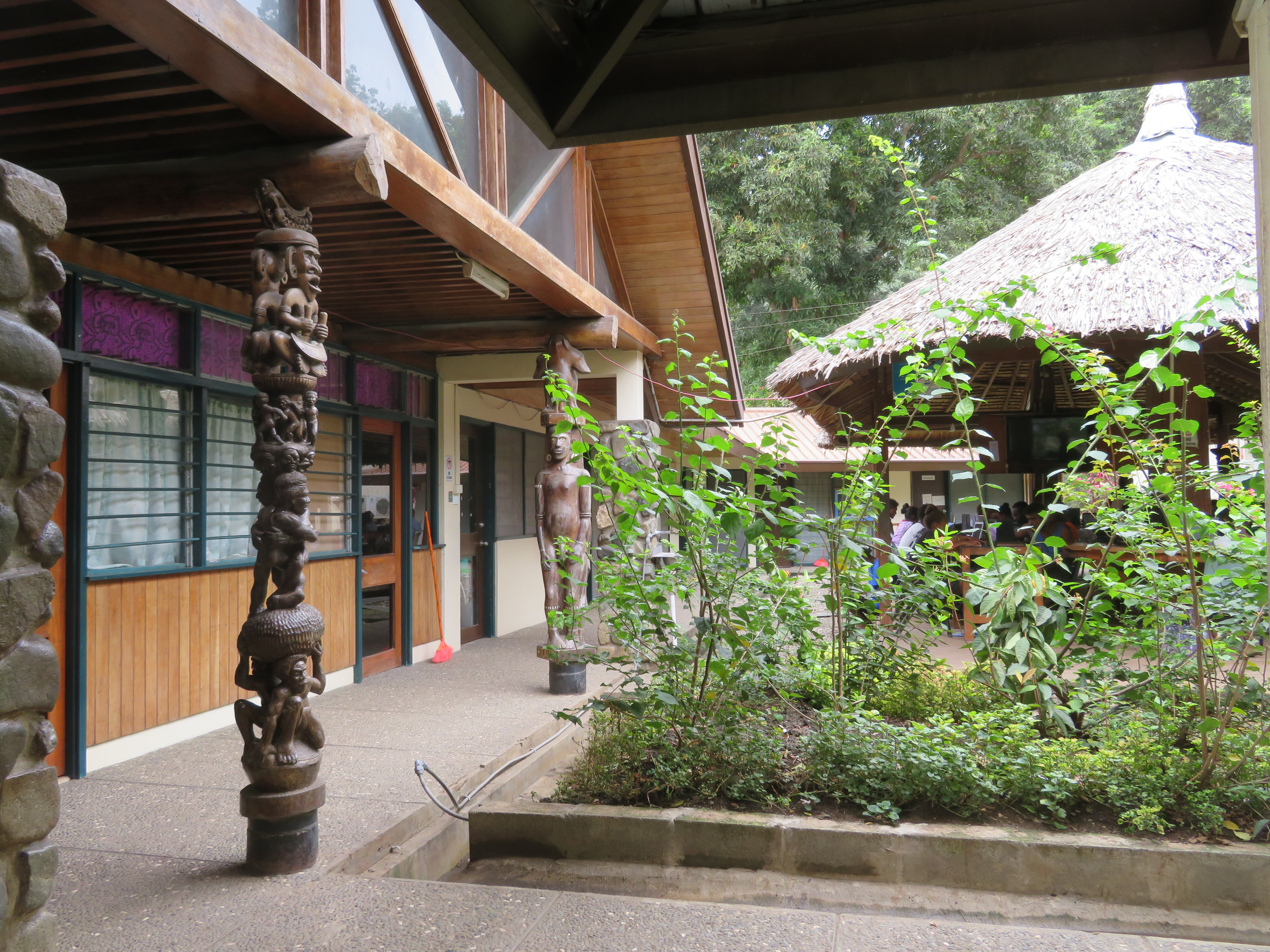
- Type: Satellite campus of the University of the South Pacific
- Location: Honiara, Solomon Islands

The University of the South Pacific (USP) Solomon Islands Campus is a satellite campus of the University of the South Pacific, based in Honiara, Solomon Islands; apart from the Honiara Solomon Islands College of Higher Education (SICHE), a university in Honiara; and the Woodford International School. The University of the South Pacific campus is located near Chinatown, about 75 metres (246 ft) to the southwest of Lawson Tama Stadium. It offers continuing and community education courses to the South Pacific member countries. Some of the major disciplines in which courses are offered on semester basis are Arts, Law and Education, Business and Economics, Science, Technology and Environment and other disciplines with a gamut of subjects in each discipline. The duration of courses varies from 10 to 32 hours of teaching spread over a number of weeks. Subjects taught based on regional requirements could be in the fields of "computer skills, languages, bookkeeping, mathematics, business studies, economics, creative writing, community development skills, literature, handicrafts, floral arts, fabric arts, woodcarving, fine arts, carving, poetry, music, video production, leadership skills, health studies, public speaking, problem-solving and general literacy skills.” An important programme that is advocated in the USP is to establish an education programme "through distance and flexible learning”, which the relevant texts to learn and teach are prepared in the Laucala Campus in Fiji and adopted in the campuses of all the USP universities across the South Pacific.

The 70th University of the South Pacific (USP) Council Meeting was held in Honiara from 12 to 13 May 2010. USP members are from the 12 countries of Cook Islands, Fiji, Kiribati, Marshall Islands, Nauru, Niue, Samoa, Solomon Islands, Tokelau, Tonga, Tuvalu and Vanuatu. In this meeting it was decided to give priority to develop the 4th Campus in Solomon Islands.
