= Solomon Islands Ports Authority =

The Solomon Islands Ports Authority (SIPA) in Honiara operates the Port of Honiara and Port of Noro.

Established on June 4, 1956, it has the primary responsibility of operating and maintaining all the facilities at the ports in public interest. It is a commercially viable organization able to meet all its expenses and also generate surplus revenue.
