= Squatting in Vanuatu =

Vanuatu on the globe

Squatting in the Republic of Vanuatu (an island country in the South Pacific Ocean) is the occupation of unused land or derelict buildings without the permission of the owner. After independence in 1980, informal settlements developed in cities such as Luganville and the capital Port Vila. Land in Vanuatu is either custom land owned by indigenous peoples or public land owned by the republic.

== History ==
The Republic of Vanuatu is an island country in the South Pacific Ocean which became independent in 1980. After 1980, internal migrants began to cluster in informal settlements around Port Vila, the capital city, which is on the island of Efate. People are forced to squat because of bad governance, the paucity of affordable housing and the lack of access to credit. The settlements do not have sanitation and are formed of shacks. Rental agreements are informal and not legally binding.

Settlements in Port Vila include Blaksans (first occupied in the 1960s) and Freswin, where settlers came on invitation of the customary land owner. The second biggest city is Luganville on the island of Espiritu Santo, where people live in informal settlements called La Milice, Mango, Pepsi, Rowok, Sarakata and St Michel. Mango was first settled by Vietnamese migrants who constructed shelters out of scrap metal left behind by the United States Army. The Vietnamese were repatriated in the 1960s and it was then occupied by Ni-Vanuatu migrants.

== Legal ==
Land in Vanuatu is either custom land owned by indigenous peoples or public land owned by the republic. Rural land is custom, urban land is public and peri-urban land can be either. The relevant laws are the 1980 constitution, the 1980 Land Reform Act, the 1983 Land Leases Act and the 2013 Custom Land Management Act. The principle of adverse possession does not exist.

== Recent ==
An informal settlement on Pentecost island in 2015

In 2015, indigenous chiefs at Mele village near Port Vila asked squatters to go home. A chief in Lenakel, on the island of Tanna, said he believed most of the squatters had migrated from Tanna and asked them to harvest their crops and then return. The following year, fifty chiefs met at the Vaturisu Council of Chiefs of Efate and resolved that squatting should be better regulated.

== See also ==
- Squatting in Solomon Islands
