= Chamburu =

- Village
- Location in Guadalcanal
- Coordinates: 9°15′13″S 159°40′57″E
- Country: Solomon Islands
- Province: Guadalcanal
- Island: Guadalcanal
- Time zone: UTC+11 (UTC)

Chamburu is a village on the northwest coast of Guadalcanal, Solomon Islands. It is located 40.6 kilometres (25.2 mi) by road northwest of Honiara.
