= Ruaniu =

- Village
- Location in Guadalcanal
- Coordinates: 9°21′28″S 159°50′43″E
- Country: Solomon Islands
- Province: Guadalcanal
- Island: Guadalcanal
- Time zone: UTC+11 (UTC)

Ruaniu is a village in Guadalcanal, Solomon Islands. It is located 18.2 kilometres (11.3 mi) by road northwest of Honiara.
