= Native Land Register =

Fijian register of native landowners

The Vola ni Kawa Bula, commonly known as the VKB, is the official Fijian register of native landowners. It is known in English as the Native Land Register. By law, all indigenous Fijians who are now to be known as iTaukei are entitled to be enrolled as members of the VKB, which is in the charge of the Native Lands Commission. Some 87 percent of Fiji's land is classified as iTaukei land, owned communally by the members of the VKB and administered by a statutory body known as the iTaukei Land Trust Board. Most squatting in Fiji tends to be on state land although tribal lands have come to be occupied as well.

On 22 November 2005, the Native Lands Commission expressed concern that parental negligence or ignorance had resulted in an estimated 20,000 indigenous Fijians not being enrolled in the VKB. Many parents wrongly assumed, they said, that a birth certificate automatically registered every child in the VKB. Consequently, it was announced that a system of automatic registration might be introduced.

== See also ==
- Culture of Fiji
