= Honiara Hotel =

Hotel in the Solomon Islands

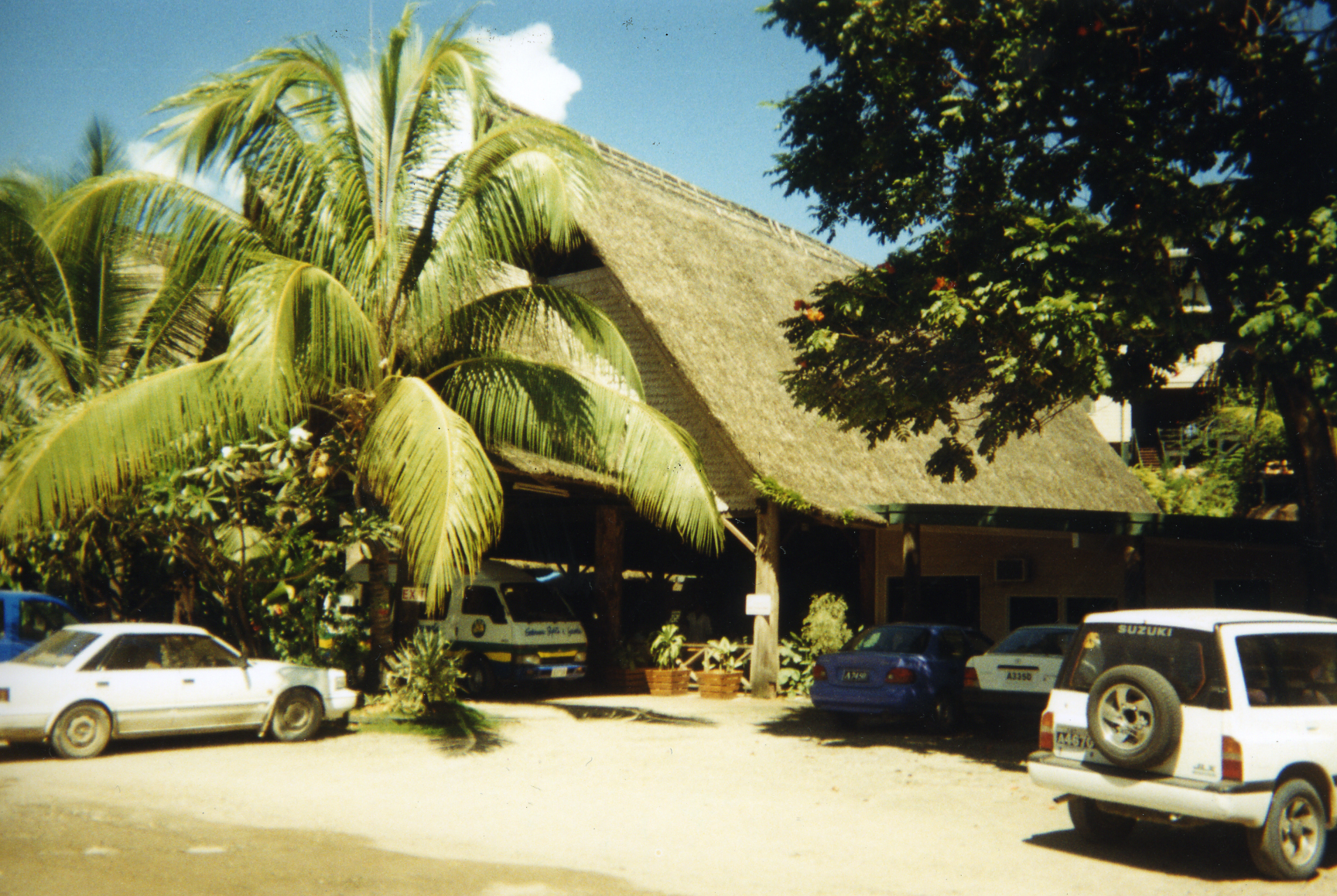
Honiara hotel, Solomon Islands

The Honiara Hotel is a 56-room hotel located in Chinatown in Honiara, Solomon Islands.

== Events ==
The hotel opened with an evening event on Sunday 1 June 1969. Around 400 guests attended the event, including Solomon Islands politician Tommy Chan's father Chan Wing.

During the April and May riots of 2006 in Honiara, Sir Tommy Chan (owner of the Honiara Hotel and a naturalized citizen of the Solomon Islands), the hotel, and his son's shop were targeted. However, they escaped damage and destruction due to support from local islanders, the Christian brotherhood, and the police.

== Bibliography ==
- Stanley, David (2004). South Pacific. David Stanley. p. 999. ISBN 978-1-56691-411-6.
- Dinnen, Sinclair; Firth, Stewart (May 2008). Politics and State Building in Solomon Islands. ANU E Press. ISBN 978-1-921313-66-0.
