= Chinatown, Honiara =

Chinatown
- Suburb
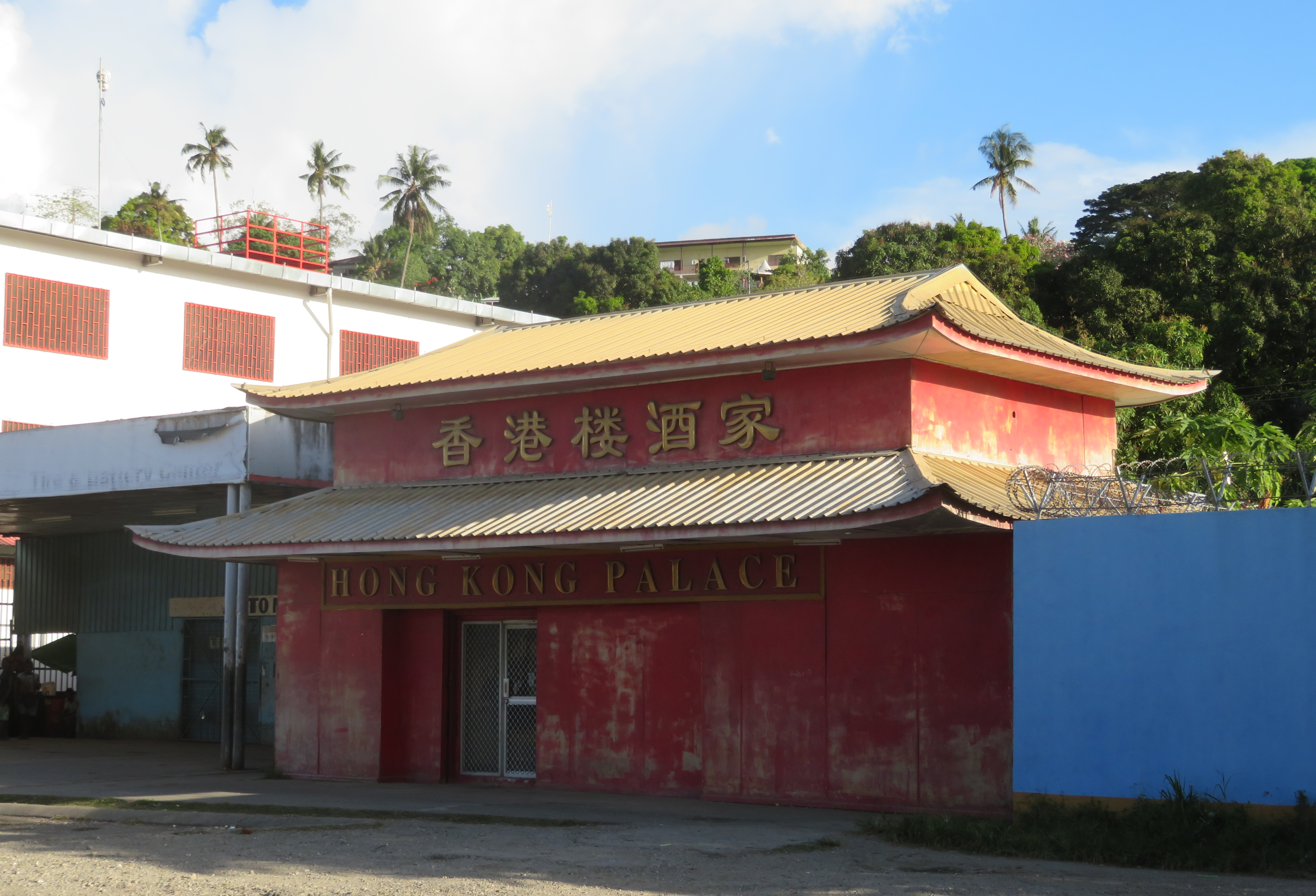

- Location in Guadalcanal
- Coordinates: 9°26′16.63″S 159°57′59.03″E
- Country: Solomon Islands
- Province: Honiara Town
- Island: Guadalcanal
- Elevation: 29 m (95 ft)
- Time zone: UTC+11 (UTC)

Chinatown is a suburb of Honiara, Solomon Islands, located southeast of the main center.

== History ==
After the 2006 general election, there was heavy rioting in Chinatown. Many protestors believed that businesses linked to the Chinese government had rigged the election, and levelled much of the neighborhood.

Chinatown suffered destruction during the 2021 Solomon Islands unrest, with many buildings burned in violent protests. Chinatown, and Chinese businesses in the neighborhood in particular, were targeted by protestors opposed to Manasseh Sogavare due to his policy of recognizing China in lieu of Taiwan.

== Building ==
- Honiara Hotel, a 56-room hotel
