= Mataniko, Honiara =

Coordinates: 9°26′S 159°58′E

Mataniko
- Ward
- Interactive map of Mataniko
- Country: Solomon Islands
- Island: Guadalcanal
- Time zone: UTC+11 (UTC)

Mataniko is a suburb of Honiara, Solomon Islands. During WWII village Matanikau, place of fights between US and Japan military during Guadalcanal campaign.
