= Honiara =

Honiara Capital Territory
- Capital city
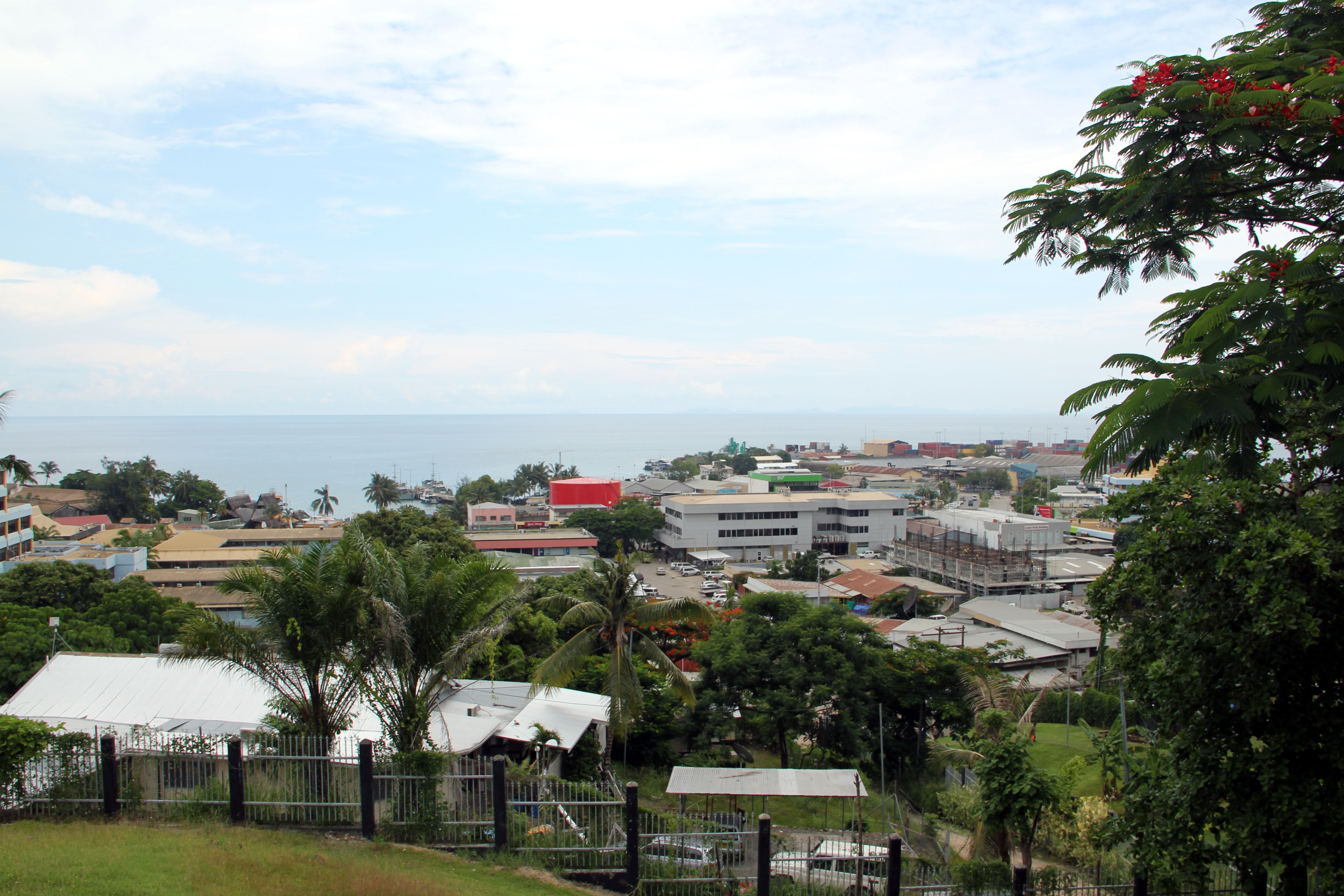
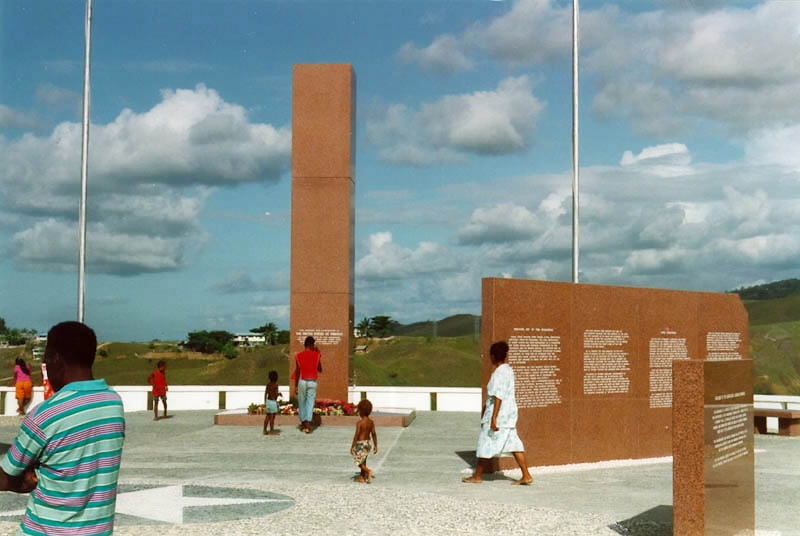
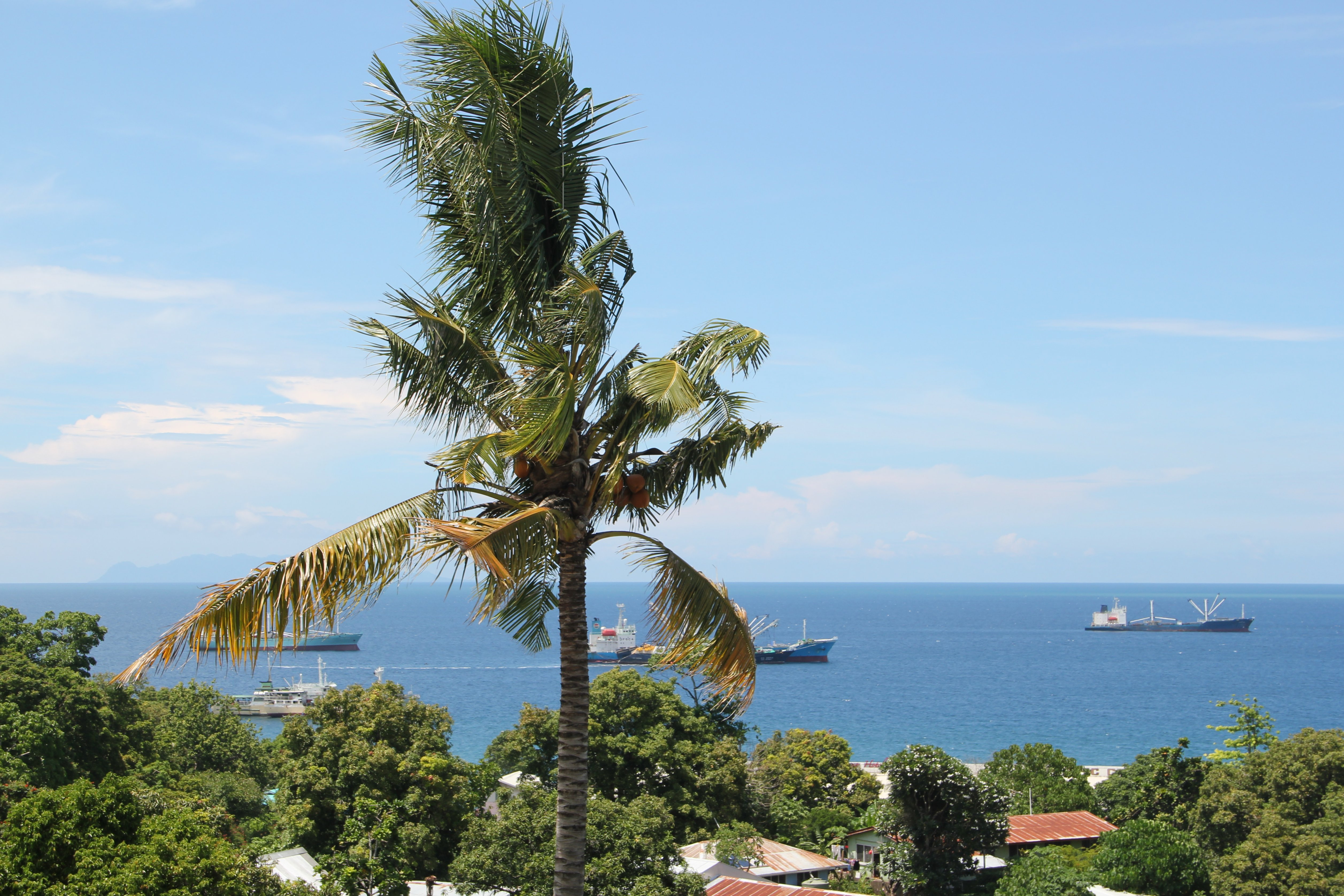
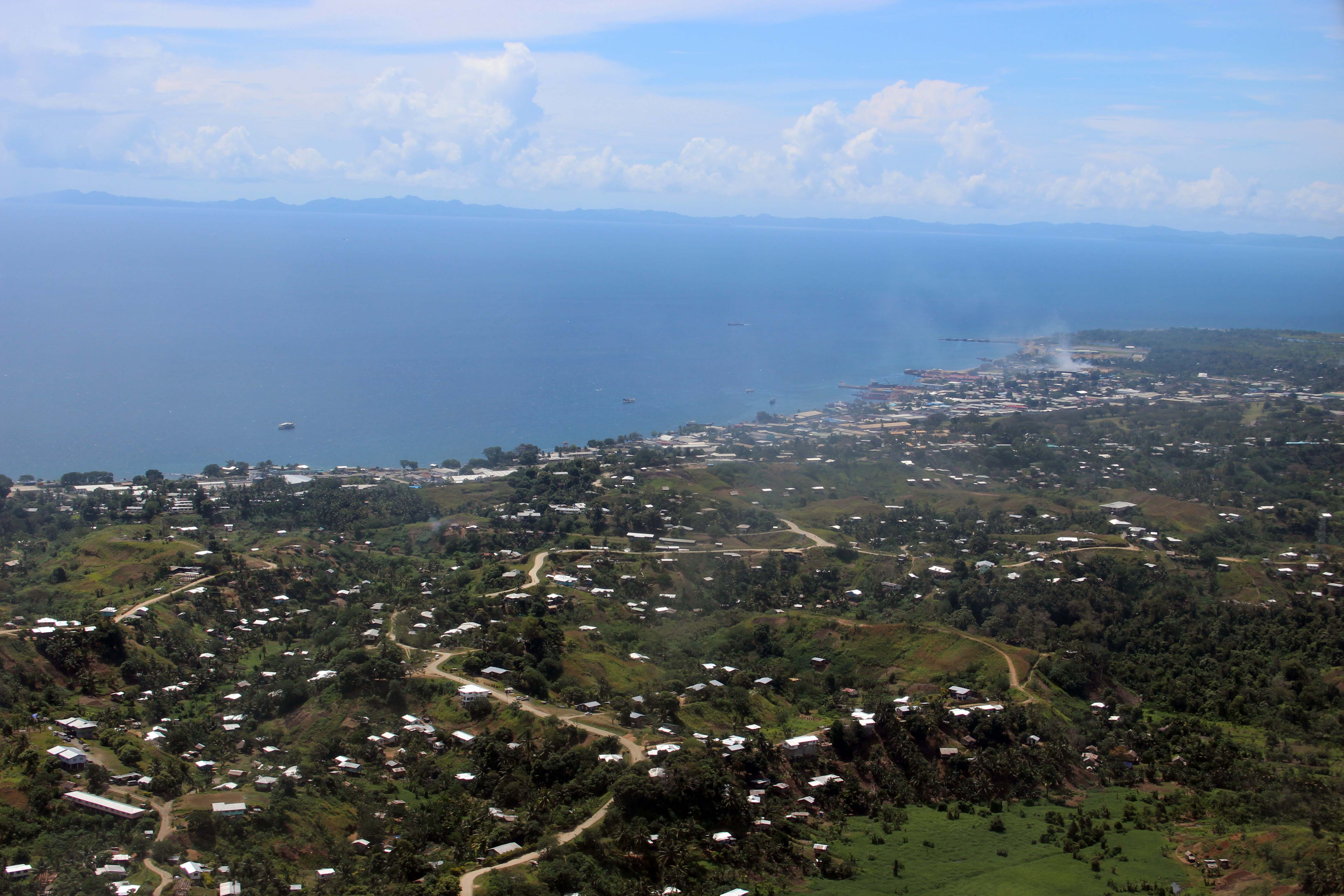
- Downtown Honiara Guadalcanal American Memorial Honiara Harbour Aerial view of Honiara

- Flag

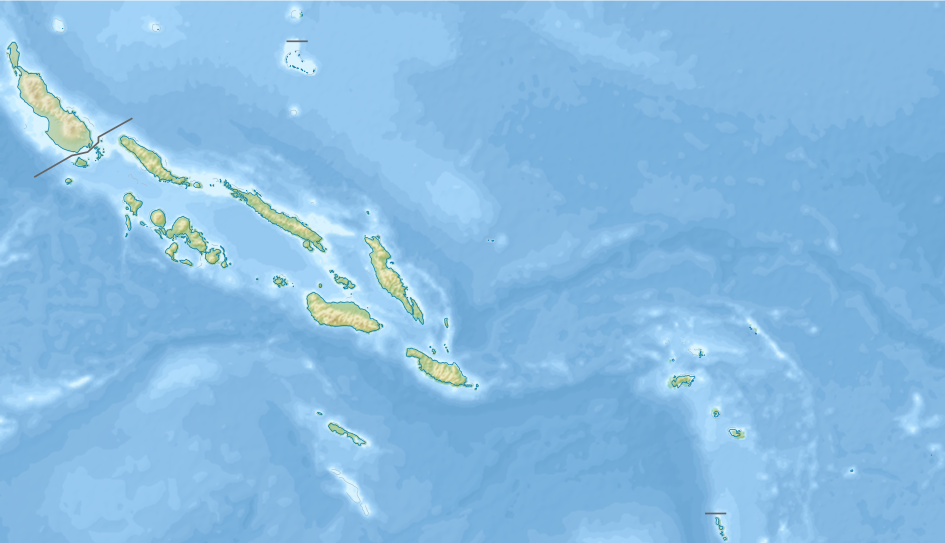
- Location within Solomon Islands Location within Oceania
- Coordinates: 9°25′55″S 159°57′20″E
- Country: Solomon Islands
- Province: Capital territory
- Island: Guadalcanal

Government
  - Mayor: Eddie Siapu

Area
  - Capital city: 22 km^{2} (8.5 sq mi)
- Elevation: 29 m (95 ft)

Population (2019 census)
  - Capital city: 129,569
  - Density: 5,900/km^{2} (15,000/sq mi)
  - Metro: 169,721
- Time zone: UTC+11:00 (UTC)
- Climate: Af

Honiara (/ˌhɒniˈɑːrə/ HON-nee-AH-rə) is the capital and largest city of Solomon Islands, situated on the northwestern coast of Guadalcanal. As of 2019, it had a population of 129,569 people. The city is served by Honiara International Airport and the seaport of Point Cruz, and lies along the Kukum Highway. In 1983, a capital territory – comprising the 22 square-kilometre metropolitan area of Honiara – was proclaimed, with a self-governing status akin to a province, although the city also retained its older role as capital of Guadalcanal Province.

The airport area to the east of Honiara was the site of a battle between the United States and the Japanese during the Guadalcanal Campaign in World War II, the Battle for Henderson Field of 1942, from which the former emerged victorious. After Honiara became the new administrative centre of the British Solomon Islands Protectorate in 1952 with the addition of many administrative buildings, the town began to develop and grow in population. Since the late 1990s, Honiara has suffered a turbulent history of ethnic violence and political unrest and is scarred by rioting. A coup attempt in June 2000 resulted in violent rebellions and fighting between the ethnic Malaitans of the Malaita Eagle Force (MEF) and the Guadalcanal natives of the Isatabu Freedom Movement (IFM).

Although a peace agreement was made in October 2000, violence ensued in the city streets in March 2002 when two diplomats from New Zealand and several others were murdered. In July 2003, conditions had become so bad in Honiara that the Regional Assistance Mission to Solomon Islands (RAMSI), consisting of multiple Pacific nations under Australian leadership, was invited into the country by the Solomons Government to restore order. In 2006, riots broke out following the election of Snyder Rini as Prime Minister, destroying a part of Chinatown and making more than 1,000 Chinese residents homeless. The riots devastated the town and tourism in the city and the islands was severely affected.

Honiara contains the majority of the major government buildings and institutions of Solomon Islands. The National Parliament of Solomon Islands, Honiara Solomon Islands College of Higher Education, International School in Honiara and University of the South Pacific Solomon Islands are located in Honiara as is the national museum and Honiara Market. Politically Honiara is divided into three parliamentary constituencies, electing 3 of the 50 members of the National Parliament. These constituencies, East Honiara, Central Honiara and West Honiara, are three of only six constituencies in the country to have an electorate of over 10,000 people.

Honiara is predominantly Christian and is served by the headquarters of the Church of the Province of Melanesia (Anglican), the Roman Catholic Archdiocese of Honiara, the South Seas Evangelical Church, the United Church, the Seventh-day Adventist Church and other Christian churches.

== Population ==
As of the 2019 census, Honiara's population is 129,569. This makes Honiara the most populous city in Solomon Islands. It is also the fastest-growing population centre in Solomon Islands. The population skews quite young; approximately 50% of Honiara's residents are younger than 30. The Ministry of Lands and Survey reported in 2006 that there were 17,000 squatters. The metropolitan population of Honiara as of 2019 is 169,721. The Honiara Urban Area includes the entire capital territory, and the Guadalcanal Province wards of Tandai (24,592 people) and Malango (15,560 people).

== History ==
The name Honiara derives from nagho ni ara which roughly translates as "place of the east wind" or "facing the southeast wind" in one of the Guadalcanal languages. The town has not been extensively documented and little detailed material exists on it.

=== World War II ===
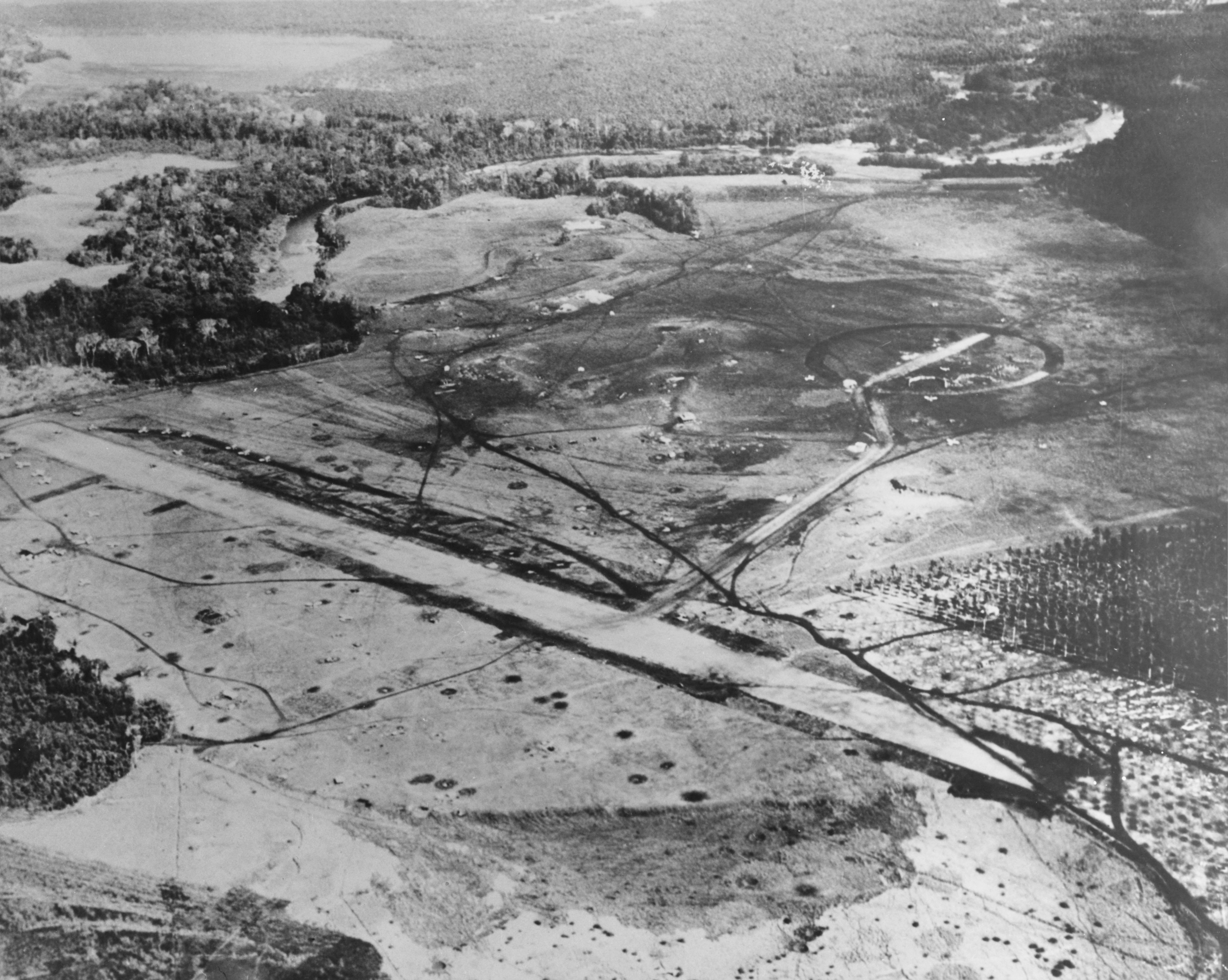
Henderson Field on Guadalcanal in late August 1942, soon after Allied aircraft began operating out of the airfield

The Battle of Henderson Field (1942), the last of the three major land offensives conducted by the Japanese during the Guadalcanal Campaign of World War II took place in what is now the airport area about 11 kilometres (6.8 mi) to the east of the city centre.

=== Modern development ===
Honiara officially became the capital of the British Protectorate of Solomon Islands in 1952. The infrastructure had been well developed by the US during the war which dictated the decision of the British Government to shift the capital to Honiara. Government buildings opened in Honiara from early January in 1952. Sir Robert Stanley was based at Honiara during his time as High Commissioner for the Western Pacific, which included the British Solomon Islands, the Condominium of New Hebrides (now Vanuatu) and the Gilbert and Ellice Islands colony (now Kiribati and Tuvalu). Macu Salato arrived in Honiara in early August 1954 and was based in the town, conducting surveys all across the islands and investigating leprosy. He departed and returned to Fiji in late March 1955.

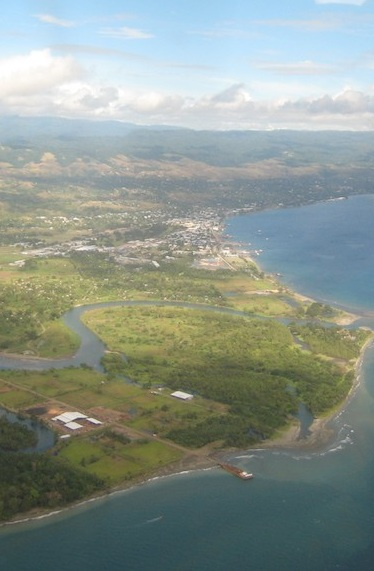
Honiara from the east

The town grew after Honiara became the capital city, receiving two-thirds of the allocations granted for the country's economic development in the 1960s and 1970s, resulting in substantial infrastructure development. Population growth was very slow and only about 5% of Solomon Islanders were living in the city. However, the Bellonese population significantly increased; they established permanent and semi-permanent houses in the Honiara vicinity, typically along the banks of the White River. The town was affected by creolisation. In the 1960s, Pijin became its principal language, and the mother tongue of a generation of young urban adults and children. Through Honiara the language spread and has since become the main language spoken in the islands.

Rhys Richards, a New Zealand historian and former New Zealand High Commissioner of Solomon Islands, spent many years in Honiara. In 1979 Honiara was still a small town in terms of population, especially for a capital city, with 18,346 people, of which 10,870 were men, and 7,476 were women. In July 1978, Honiara became the new capital of the independent Solomon Islands.

=== Conflict ===
An International Express Mail Agreement and regulations were signed between the United States and Solomon Islands governments in Honiara and Washington, D.C. on 19 April and 27 June 1991, coming into effect on 1 August 1991. On 6 November 1998, a peace agreement was signed in Honiara between the United States and Solomon Islands governments. However, since the late 1990s, Honiara has been the centre of ethnic violence and political unrest in the country. The area around Honiara was the battle ground of rival factions during the unrest as a result of the dominance of Malaitans, who were outsiders, and the local Guadalcanal islanders. A coup attempt occurred in June 2000 which resulted in violent rebellions and fighting between the Malaita Eagle Force (MEF) and the Guadalcanal natives of the Isatabu Freedom Movement (IFM). Violence was prevalent in the streets of Honiara, and although a peace agreement was made in October 2000, violence ensued in March 2002 when two diplomats from New Zealand and several others were murdered. Conditions became so bad in Honiara that in July 2003 Australian military and police units moved into the country to suppress the conflict, increase security, rebuild the damaged city and safeguard its shattered economic, political and legal institutions.

In 2006, riots broke out following the election of Snyder Rini as Prime Minister, destroying part of Chinatown and displacing more than 1,000 Chinese residents; the large Pacific Casino Hotel was also totally gutted. The commercial heart of Honiara was virtually reduced to rubble and ashes. Three National Parliament members, Charles Dausabea, Nelson Ne'e, and Patrick Vahoe, were arrested during or as a result of the riots. The Regional Assistance Mission to Solomon Islands (RAMSI), the 16-country Pacific Islands Forum initiative set up in 2003 with assistance from Australia, intervened, sending in additional police and army officers to bring the situation under control. A vote of no confidence was passed against the Prime Minister. Following his resignation, a five-party Grand Coalition for Change Government was formed in May 2006, with Manasseh Sogavare as Prime Minister, quelling the riots and running the government. The army part of RAMSI was removed and rebuilding took shape.

In 2021, Honiara saw mass unrest; the Solomon Islands Parliament Building was attacked, and Chinatown was looted and burned.

== Geography and climate ==
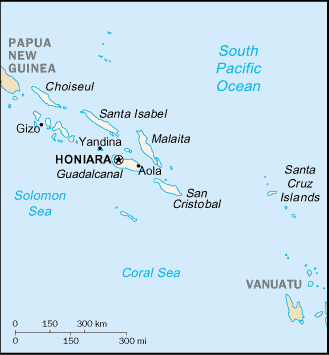
Location of Honiara

Honiara is located on the northwestern coast of the island of Guadalcanal and includes a seaport at Point Cruz. The Matanikau River flows through the town, past Chinatown, badly affected by the 2006 riot. The town revolves around the Kukum Highway, which connects it with the Honiara International Airport (formerly known as Henderson Field) about 11 kilometres (6.8 mi) to the east of Honiara across the Lunga River. To the west of the town centre are the suburbs of White River and Tanaghai.

The climate is tropical, more specifically a tropical rainforest climate (Af), with an average daytime temperature of about 28 °C (82 °F). Honiara is wetter between November and April. The average precipitation per year is about 2,000 millimetres (79 in) and thus is lower than the average for Solomon Islands as a whole (3,000 millimetres (120 in)). Honiara is subject to monsoons. On 1 February 2010, Honiara recorded a temperature of 36.1 °C (97.0 °F), which is the highest temperature to have ever been recorded in Solomon Islands.

Climate data for Honiara International Airport (1991–2020)
Month	Jan	Feb	Mar	Apr	May	Jun	Jul	Aug	Sep	Oct	Nov	Dec	Year
Record high °C (°F)	36.1 (97.0)	37.4 (99.3)	35.5 (95.9)	35.0 (95.0)	35.5 (95.9)	34.7 (94.5)	34.7 (94.5)	36.5 (97.7)	34.6 (94.3)	34.9 (94.8)	35.1 (95.2)	36.0 (96.8)	37.4 (99.3)
Mean daily maximum °C (°F)	31.6 (88.9)	31.5 (88.7)	31.4 (88.5)	31.5 (88.7)	31.6 (88.9)	31.3 (88.3)	31.3 (88.3)	31.2 (88.2)	31.6 (88.9)	31.6 (88.9)	31.7 (89.1)	31.7 (89.1)	31.5 (88.7)
Daily mean °C (°F)	27.6 (81.7)	27.5 (81.5)	27.4 (81.3)	27.3 (81.1)	27.3 (81.1)	26.9 (80.4)	26.7 (80.1)	26.6 (79.9)	26.9 (80.4)	27.0 (80.6)	27.3 (81.1)	27.5 (81.5)	27.2 (81.0)
Mean daily minimum °C (°F)	23.5 (74.3)	23.4 (74.1)	23.3 (73.9)	23.2 (73.8)	22.9 (73.2)	22.4 (72.3)	22.1 (71.8)	22.0 (71.6)	22.2 (72.0)	22.4 (72.3)	22.8 (73.0)	23.3 (73.9)	22.8 (73.0)
Record low °C (°F)	17.6 (63.7)	19.9 (67.8)	19.8 (67.6)	18.5 (65.3)	19.0 (66.2)	16.7 (62.1)	16.7 (62.1)	15.9 (60.6)	16.9 (62.4)	18.0 (64.4)	18.6 (65.5)	20.0 (68.0)	15.9 (60.6)
Average precipitation mm (inches)	239.0 (9.41)	290.4 (11.43)	285.0 (11.22)	190.1 (7.48)	111.6 (4.39)	85.6 (3.37)	100.3 (3.95)	95.4 (3.76)	90.1 (3.55)	117.7 (4.63)	145.3 (5.72)	210.5 (8.29)	1,967.8 (77.47)
Average precipitation days (≥ 1 mm)	14	14	15	11	10	9	9	10	8	9	10	12	130
Source: National Oceanic and Atmospheric Administration

Climate data for Honiara
Month	Jan	Feb	Mar	Apr	May	Jun	Jul	Aug	Sep	Oct	Nov	Dec	Year
Record high °C (°F)	33.9 (93.0)	36.1 (97.0)	33.9 (93.0)	33.4 (92.1)	33.6 (92.5)	32.8 (91.0)	33.3 (91.9)	34.5 (94.1)	33.4 (92.1)	33.3 (91.9)	33.4 (92.1)	34.8 (94.6)	36.1 (97.0)
Mean daily maximum °C (°F)	30.7 (87.3)	30.5 (86.9)	30.2 (86.4)	30.5 (86.9)	30.7 (87.3)	30.4 (86.7)	30.1 (86.2)	30.4 (86.7)	30.6 (87.1)	30.7 (87.3)	30.7 (87.3)	30.5 (86.9)	30.5 (86.9)
Daily mean °C (°F)	26.7 (80.1)	26.6 (79.9)	26.6 (79.9)	26.5 (79.7)	26.6 (79.9)	26.4 (79.5)	26.1 (79.0)	26.2 (79.2)	26.5 (79.7)	26.5 (79.7)	26.7 (80.1)	26.8 (80.2)	26.5 (79.7)
Mean daily minimum °C (°F)	23.0 (73.4)	23.0 (73.4)	23.0 (73.4)	22.9 (73.2)	22.8 (73.0)	22.5 (72.5)	22.2 (72.0)	22.1 (71.8)	22.3 (72.1)	22.5 (72.5)	22.7 (72.9)	23.0 (73.4)	22.7 (72.9)
Record low °C (°F)	20.2 (68.4)	20.7 (69.3)	20.7 (69.3)	20.1 (68.2)	20.5 (68.9)	19.4 (66.9)	18.7 (65.7)	18.8 (65.8)	18.3 (64.9)	17.6 (63.7)	17.8 (64.0)	20.5 (68.9)	17.6 (63.7)
Average precipitation mm (inches)	277 (10.9)	287 (11.3)	362 (14.3)	214 (8.4)	141 (5.6)	97 (3.8)	100 (3.9)	92 (3.6)	95 (3.7)	154 (6.1)	141 (5.6)	217 (8.5)	2,177 (85.7)
Average precipitation days (≥ 0.1 mm)	19	19	23	18	15	13	15	13	13	16	15	18	197
Average relative humidity (%)	80	81	81	80	80	79	75	73	73	75	76	77	78
Mean monthly sunshine hours	186.0	155.4	198.4	192.0	210.8	198.0	186.0	204.6	192.0	226.3	216.0	164.3	2,329.8
Mean daily sunshine hours	6.0	5.5	6.4	6.4	6.8	6.6	6.0	6.6	6.4	7.3	7.2	5.3	6.4
Source: Deutscher Wetterdienst

== Politics ==
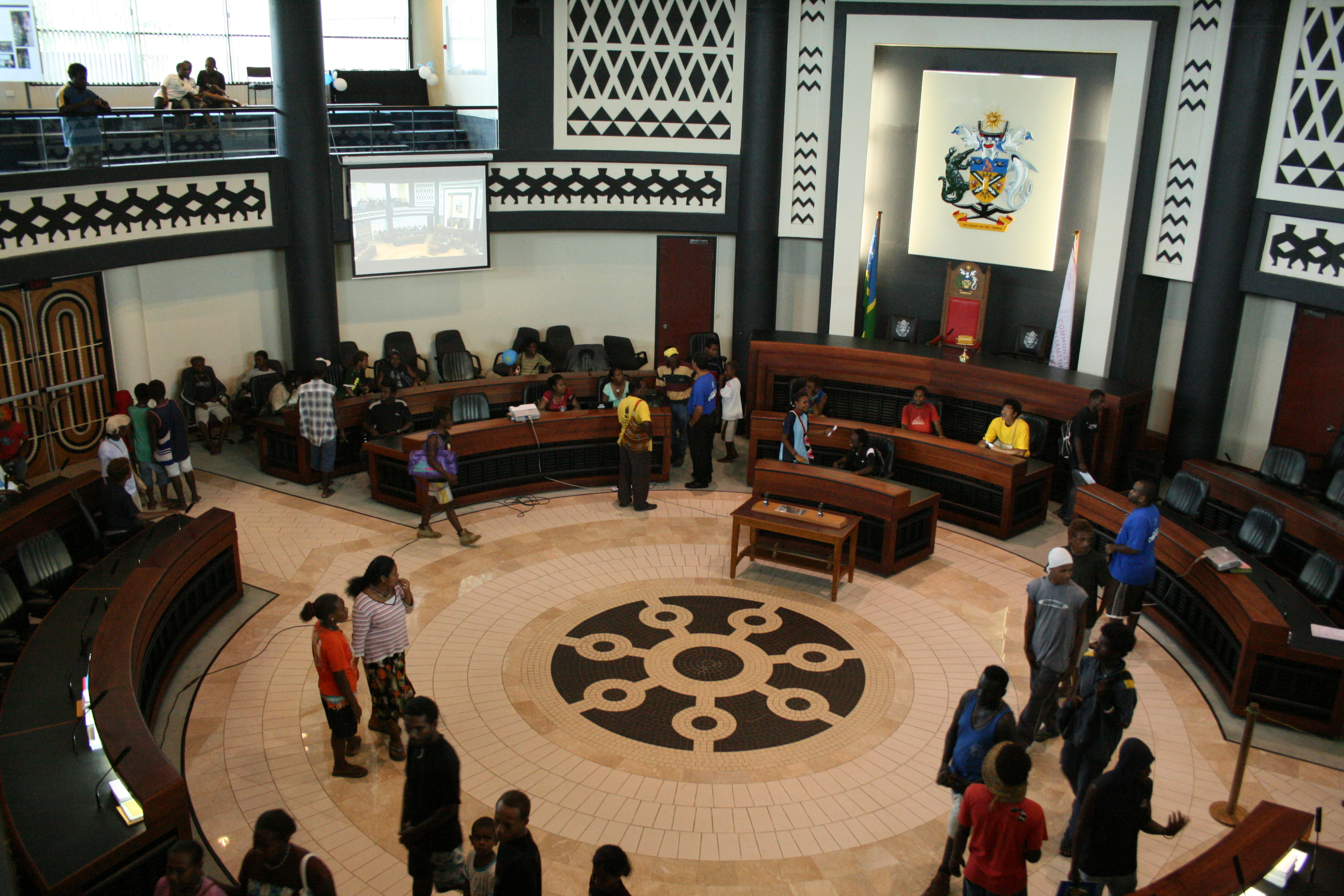
National Parliament of Solomon Islands in Honiara

Honiara is divided into three parliamentary constituencies, electing three of the 50 Members of the National Parliament. These constituencies (East Honiara, Central Honiara and West Honiara) are three of only six constituencies in the country to have an electorate of over 10,000. East Honiara, with an electorate of 30,049 in 2006, is the only constituency in the country with more than 20,000 voters. Following the 2019 general election, the city's representatives are:

Constituency	Electorate	MP (party)	Notes
East Honiara	30,049	Douglas Ete (Democratic Party)	National Election 3 April 2019
Central Honiara	19,539	John Moffat Fugui (United Democratic Party)	National Election 3 April 2019
West Honiara	13,128	Namson Tran (Independent)	National Election 3 April 2019

== Administrative divisions ==
The National Capital Region of Honiara is sub-divided into the following constituencies (or electoral districts), which are further sub-divided into wards (with populations at the 2009 and 2019 Censuses respectively):

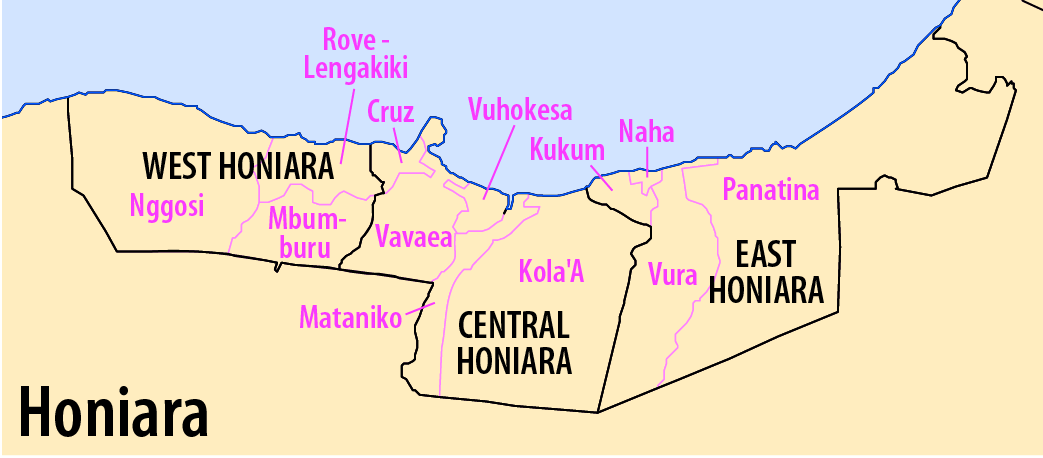
3 Electoral Districts and 12 Wards of Honiara

Name		Area	Population (2009 census)			Density (2009 census)	Population (2019 census)			Density (2019 census)
Name		Area	Total	Male	Female	Density (2009 census)	Total	Male	Female	Density (2019 census)
41. – East Honiara		9.61	25,390	13,339	12,051	2,642	54,470	27,937	26,533	5,668
41.09.	Kukum	0.33	1,835	971	864	5,524	2,541	1,412	1,129	7,700
41.10.	Naha	0.08	356	187	169	4,565	464	252	212	5,800
41.11.	Vura	2.21	9,096	4,697	4,399	4,123	18,753	9,482	9,271	8,486
41.12.	Panatina	6.99	14,103	7,484	6,619	2,018	32,712	16,791	15,921	4,680
42. – Central Honiara		7.79	22,919	12,134	10,785	2,942	39,040	20,324	18,716	5,012
42.04.	Cruz	0.27	232	125	107	846	394	293	101	1,459
42.05.	Vavaea	1.51	6,996	3,788	3,208	4,611	10,813	5,640	5,173	7,161
42.06.	Vuhokesa	0.30	1,197	627	570	4,014	1,328	691	637	4,427
42.07.	Mataniko	0.84	4,343	2,249	2,094	5,197	5,722	3,000	2,722	6,812
42.08.	Kola'a	4.87	10,151	5,345	4,806	2,086	20,783	10,700	10,083	4,268
43. – West Honiara		5.98	16,300	8,616	7,684	2,726	36,059	18,548	17,511	6,030
43.01.	Nggossi	3.80	10,062	5,240	4,822	2,651	26,009	13,216	12,793	6,844
43.02.	Mbumburu	1.22	3,625	1,912	1,713	2,960	5,806	2,936	2,870	4,759
43.03.	Rove/Lengakiki	0.96	2,613	1,464	1,149	2,719	4,244	2,396	1,848	4,421
Total		23.37	64,609	34,089	30,520	2,765	129,569	66,809	62,760	5,568

== Economy ==
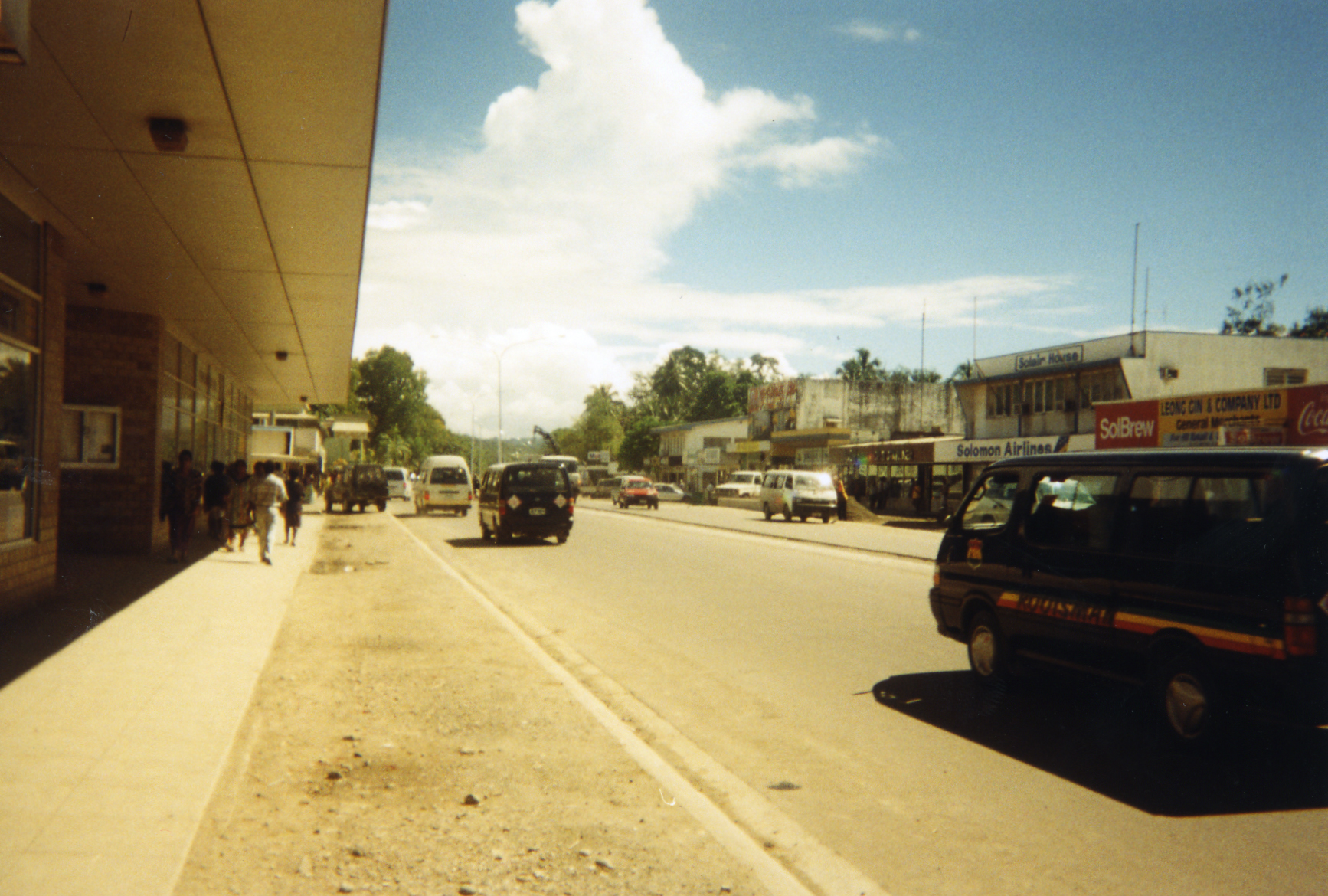
The main street of Honiara

Honiara developed economically at a much faster rate than other parts of Solomon Islands; during the 1960s and 1970s, some two-thirds of the investment into economic development in the country went into developing the infrastructure of Honiara, despite the fact that at the time only some five percent of Solomon Islanders lived there. Like Tulagi, the town did not grow substantially as a result of industrialisation. As Trevor Sofield says, "The shops and businesses in these centres served the needs of the government officials and expatriate businessmen, planters, and traders. Honiara, like many other ex-colonial cities, still reflects the political, economic, and cultural structure of its former metropolitan mentor much more than it does the national traits of Solomon Islands society."

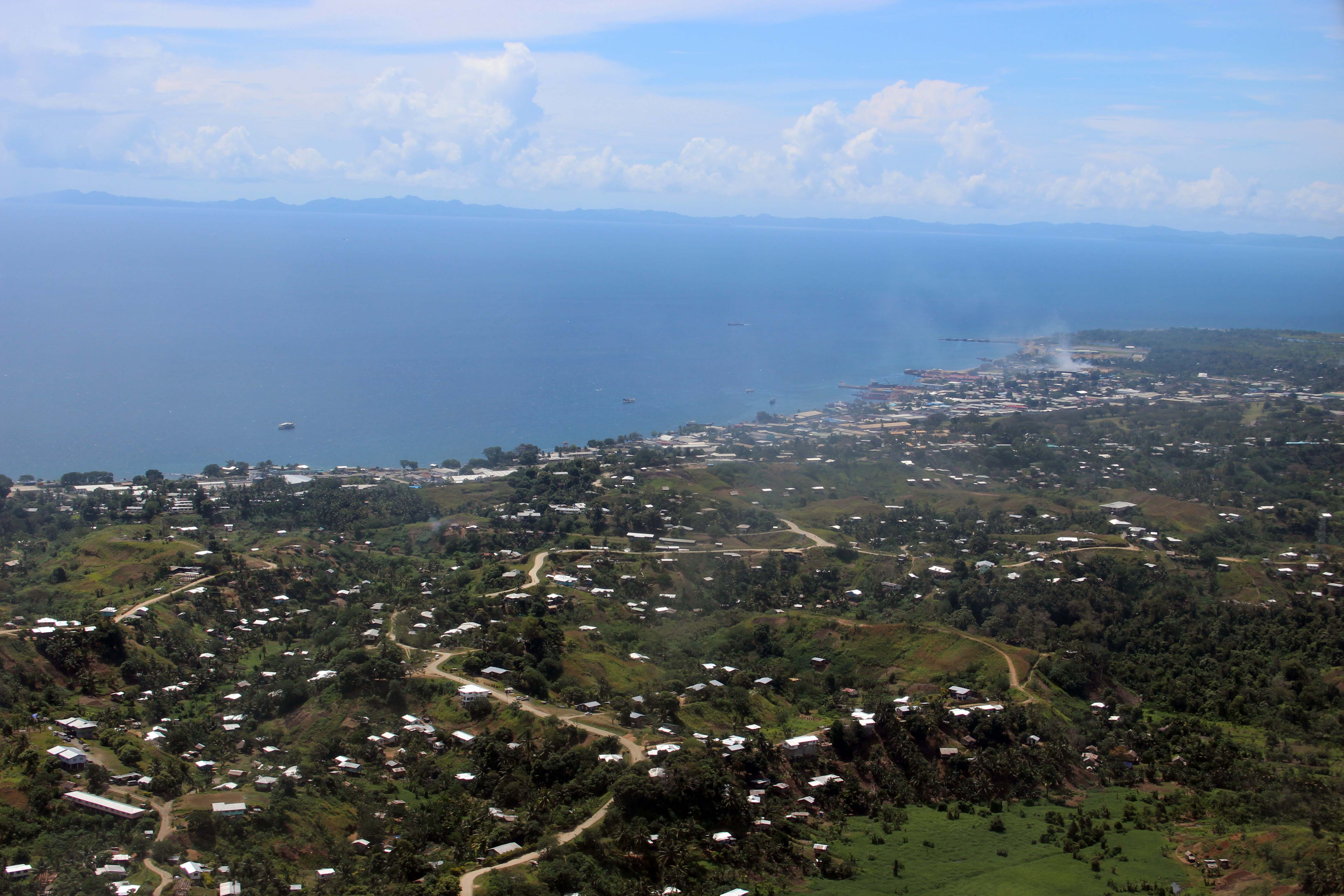
View of Honiara

Honiara is Solomon Islands' springboard for tourism activities. The country's tourist office, Solomon Islands Visitors Bureau, is on Honiara's main thoroughfare, Mendana Avenue. Situated between the Yacht Club and the Solomon Kitano Mendana Hotel, its officers provide tourist information and can radio ahead to announce visitors' arrivals to guest houses in the remoter areas. Honiara banks include BSP Bank, the ANZ Bank, BRED Bank and POB Bank. Anchorage facilities are available in Honiara Port for both national and international ships.

The violence which had plagued Honiara and the islands since the late 1990s had a devastating impact on the economy due to the fact that many tourist organisations around the world warned tourists wishing to visit the islands to stay away, especially in 2002 and 2003 at the peak of the troubles. In 1998, the country earned around $13 million from tourism and just $629,000 in 1999, equating to an average spend per visit of only US$254 (about US$35/day). In 1999, tourism in the city and nation accounted for just 4.38% of the total GDP.

== Landmarks ==
As the capital of Solomon Islands, Honiara contains the majority of the major government buildings and institutions, including Honiara Lauru Land Conference, Honiara Solomon Islands College of Higher Education, International School in Honiara, University of the South Pacific Solomon Islands, Honiara Solomon Islands Ports Authority. These centres are involved in marine research in Solomon Islands. The Dodo Creek Research Station of the Ministry of Agriculture and Lands is based in Honiara. Honiara Central Market is the centre of trading activity in the islands and contains many market stalls selling a wide range of goods. East of the mouth of the Mataniko River is the beach where, in the shallow waters of the sea, wrecks of a Japanese ship destroyed on 23 October 1942 by American artillery and small arms can be seen. At the back of the beach there is a settlement called the Lord Howe Settlement, consisting of a large community of Polynesians from Ongtong Java in the Western Provinces. Chinatown, with its high porches, is said to look like an "Asian Wild West".

Honiara Children's Park is a property of the Honiara Beautification Committee. The park, the only children's recreation area in Honiara, is located along the eastern coast of Honiara City as all other areas in the region are private property. According to a study, the park is in danger and needs to be protected as the coastline is subject to erosion; the erosion is recorded to be about 6–8 metres (20–26 ft) between the old coastline and the eroded coastline. This erosion needs to be checked by building a retaining wall.

=== War memorial and peace park ===
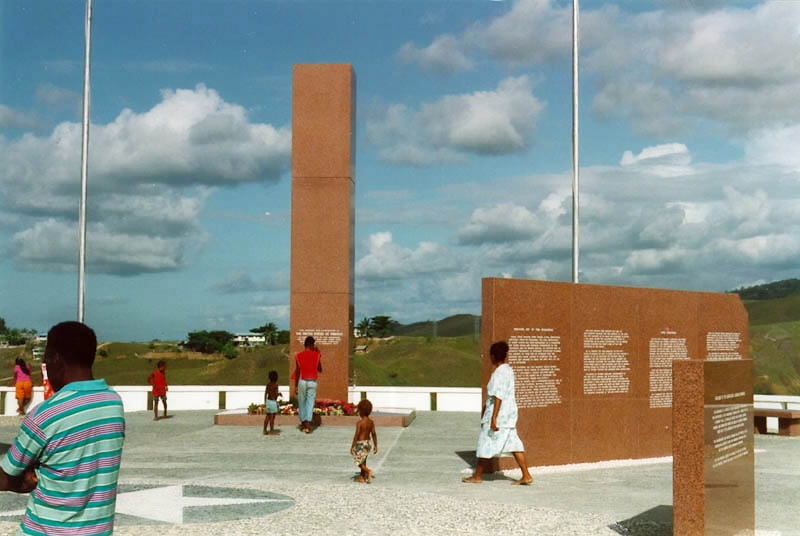
Guadalcanal American Memorial

The Guadalcanal American Memorial is an attraction. It was built at the initiative of Robert F Reynolds, Chief of Valors Tours Ltd. To mark the 50th anniversary of the Red Beach landings, the U.S. War Memorial was dedicated on 7 August 1992. An account of this is inscribed on red marble tablets inside the monument compound. The Solomons Peace Memorial Park, built by the Japanese war veterans in memory of all those who were killed in World War II, is about 3.5 kilometres (2.2 mi) down the coastal road. There are several other relics from World War II in and around Honiara, described by Lonely Planet as "spooky". Also seen is the memorial erected in honour of Sergeant Major Jacob Vouza, a highly decorated war hero who escaped after the Japanese tortured him and lived to tell his story.

=== National Parliament and Government House ===
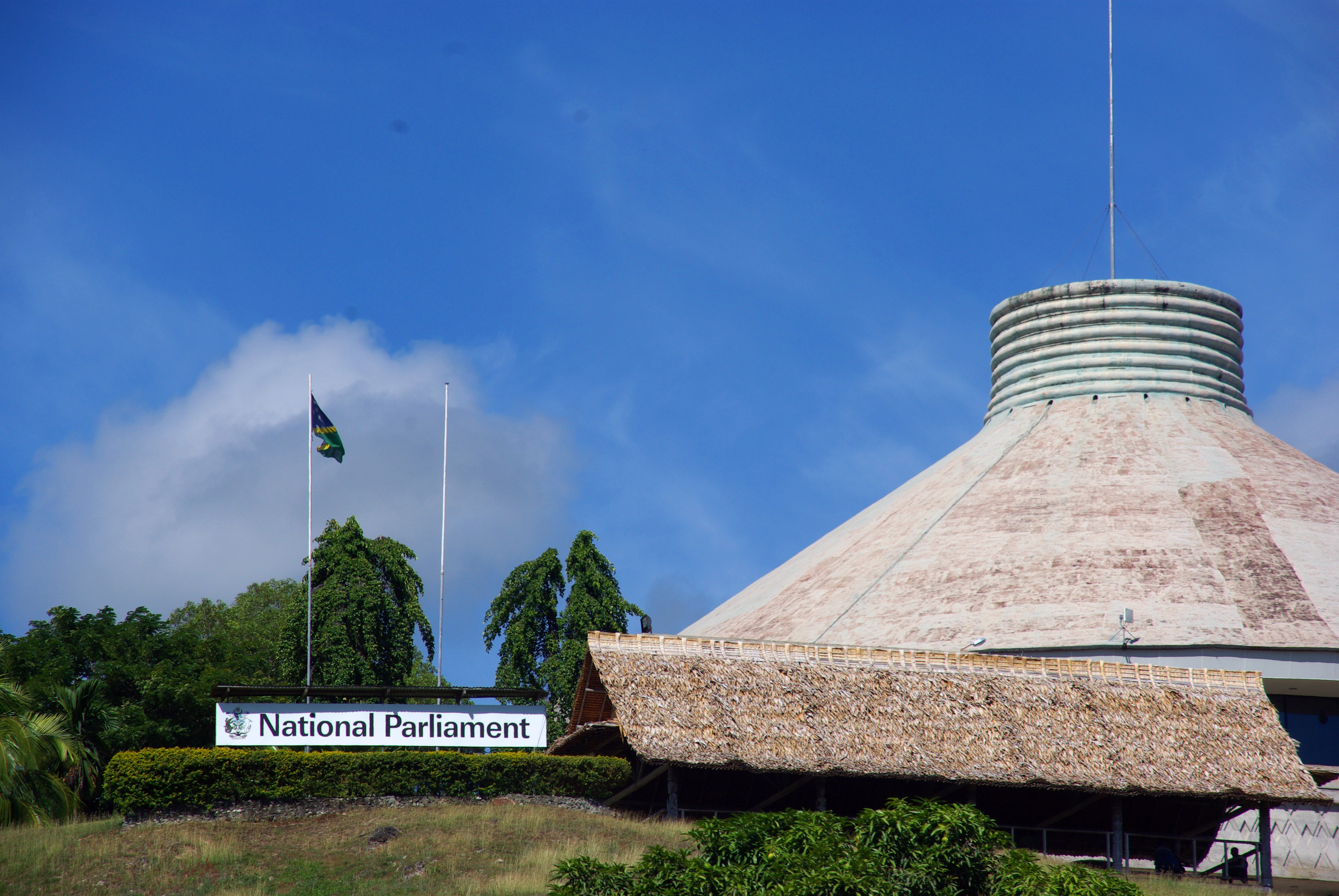
Solomon Islands Houses of Parliament, one of many government buildings that were built in Honiara after it became the national capital in 1952

The Solomon Islands Parliament Building, located on the hill above Hibiscus Avenue, built with American aid, is a concrete structure of conical-shape, which was inaugurated in 1993. The dome has tapestry, frescoes, and traditional artwork. The parliament building was built at a cost of US$5 million in honour of the 450 U.S. soldiers and 1,200 Marines who died during the Guadalcanal operations during the war. Ironically the building was originally built by a Japanese firm.

=== Museums ===
The National Museum, located opposite the Mendana Hotel, has exhibits of traditional handicrafts and historical artefacts, particularly exhibits on archaeology, currencies, arms, languages, personal ornaments, traditional music and dance, agricultural implements, life and natural environs of the country, fishing tools and tackles, and many publications and handicrafts. The Cultural Centre of the museum has a display of eight traditional houses, built in 1981, from the nine provinces of Solomon Islands. The museum hosted the first Melanesian Arts and Crafts festival in 1998, and organises dances on the festival stage opposite the museum. There is also a 155 millimetres (6.1 in) Japanese howitzer on display between the museum and the police station, which is called "Pistol Pete". It was used for bombarding Henderson Field during the Guadalcanal fighting. On the opposite side of the police station is the Central Bank, which has a display of traditional currency. It also has Rennellese wood carvings and paintings. The Cultural Centre behind the museum has exhibits of traditional architectural styles. The National Art Gallery arranges painting exhibitions at the Old Government House, the former residence of the Governor General. A collection of historical importance can be seen at the National Archives which is open to the public.

The Botanical Gardens of the National Art Gallery is popular for afternoon strolls, and is noted for its orchids and shrubs. It houses a herbarium, a lily studded waterbody, walkways, and the Watapamu village, representing a typical village of the islands, which is named after the water pump located nearby. An Anthropology Museum is located in Honiara, which has exhibits of recent origin.

=== Schools ===
Prominent educational institutions in Honiara include Solomon Islands National University (SINU); The Woodford International School; and the University of the South Pacific (USP) Solomon Islands Campus.

The Woodford International School, also called the International School, was initiated in the mid-1950s with about a dozen students. It was expanded under Solomon Islands' National Development Plan in the 1970s with the aim to attract investment and expertise into the country. In 1979, following independence in 1978 from the British rule, with British aid, new school buildings were built. The school was known as Honiara International School in September 1989 and took the name of Woodford International School in the 1990s. It is now a fully recognised independent education authority, and the government of Solomon Islands is only involved in providing a grant to the school. Since 2007, the management has started a programme of enhancing the building and other infrastructure facilities of the school to seek recognition as an "International Baccalaureate World School". It offers the IB Primary Years Programme, and not the IB Diploma Programme.

Chung Wah School in Honiara provides teaching in Chinese.

The University of the South Pacific (USP) Solomon Islands Campus at Honiara provides education to students of the South Pacific.

=== Libraries and books ===
The Public Library is on Belan Avenue, between Chinatown and the market place, while the National Library is just behind the Public Library. Books authored by Solomon Islanders are available at the University of the South Pacific Centre, which is behind the National Gymnasium to the east of Chinatown. Books are also on sale at Riley's Pocket Bookstore in the lobby of the Honiara Hotel with works by authors including John Saunana and Julian Maka'a. Another bookstore opened in 2010 called the "Save Senta"; it is located at Point Cruz in Honiara. Australian newspapers are available at the news stalls in the Anthony Saru building. Solomon Islands Development Trust in New Chinatown publishes a quarterly journal titled Link on issues of local concern and environmental issues. The daily newspaper is the Solomon Star while Solomon Times and Solomon Voice are weekly publications.

=== Hospitals ===
The National Referral Hospital of Honiara (NRH), also known as the Central Referral Hospital, is the main hospital and the largest in Solomon Islands. It is located opposite the Honiara Hotel. As of July 2012 the hospital, which suffers from overcrowding, had 300 to 400 beds with 50 doctors. In 2008, its accident and emergency department served 55,234 patients and its general surgery department operated on 1,971 patients. Because Solomon Islands Pijin uses phonemic orthography, Solomon Islanders often call it the Nambanaen, a phonetic transcription of "Number Nine". This name originated from the "Ninth Station" name given to it by American soldiers during World War II. The hospital was substantially enlarged with assistance from the Government of Taiwan in 1993.

=== Churches ===
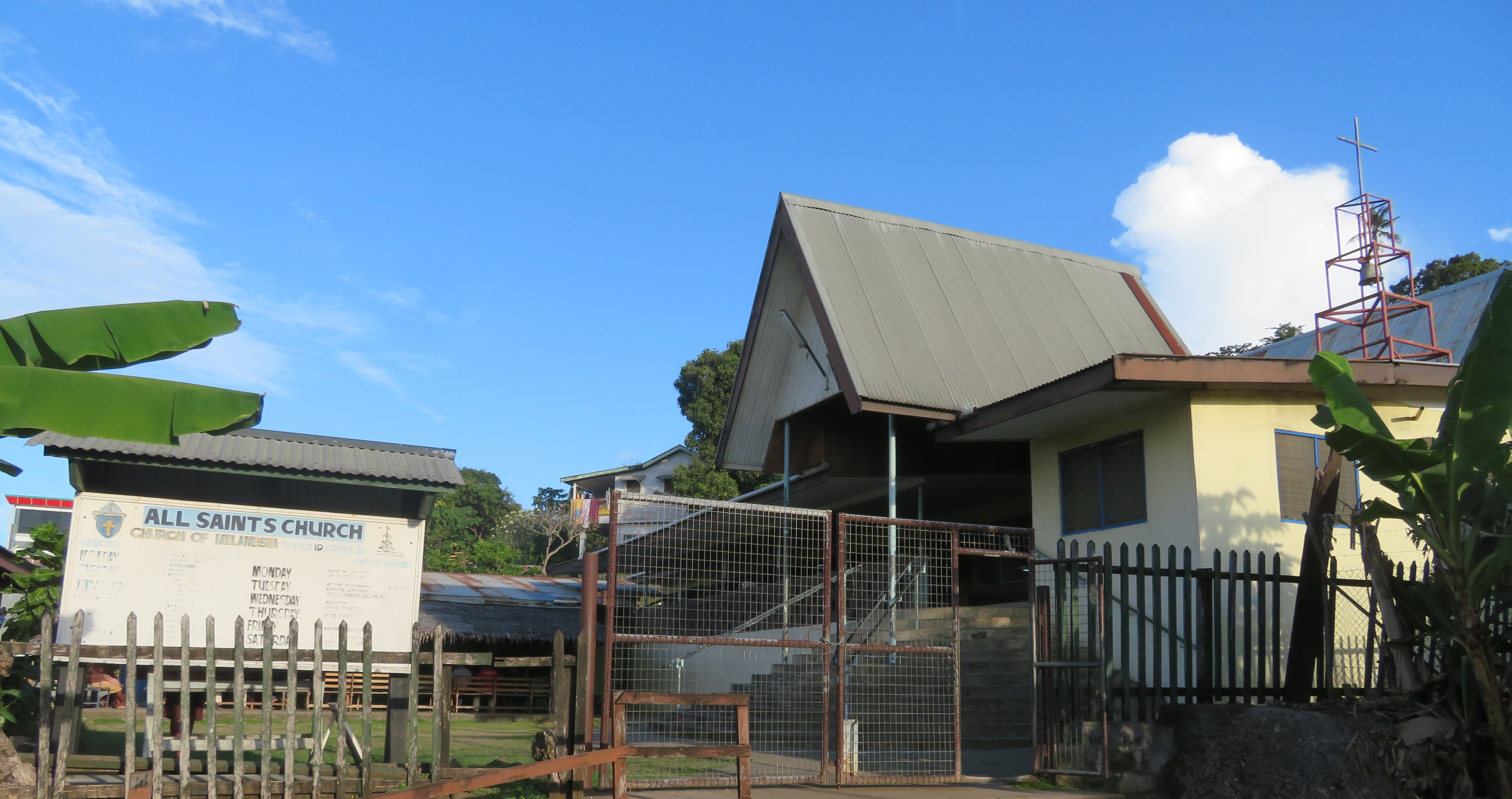
All Saints' Church, Honiara

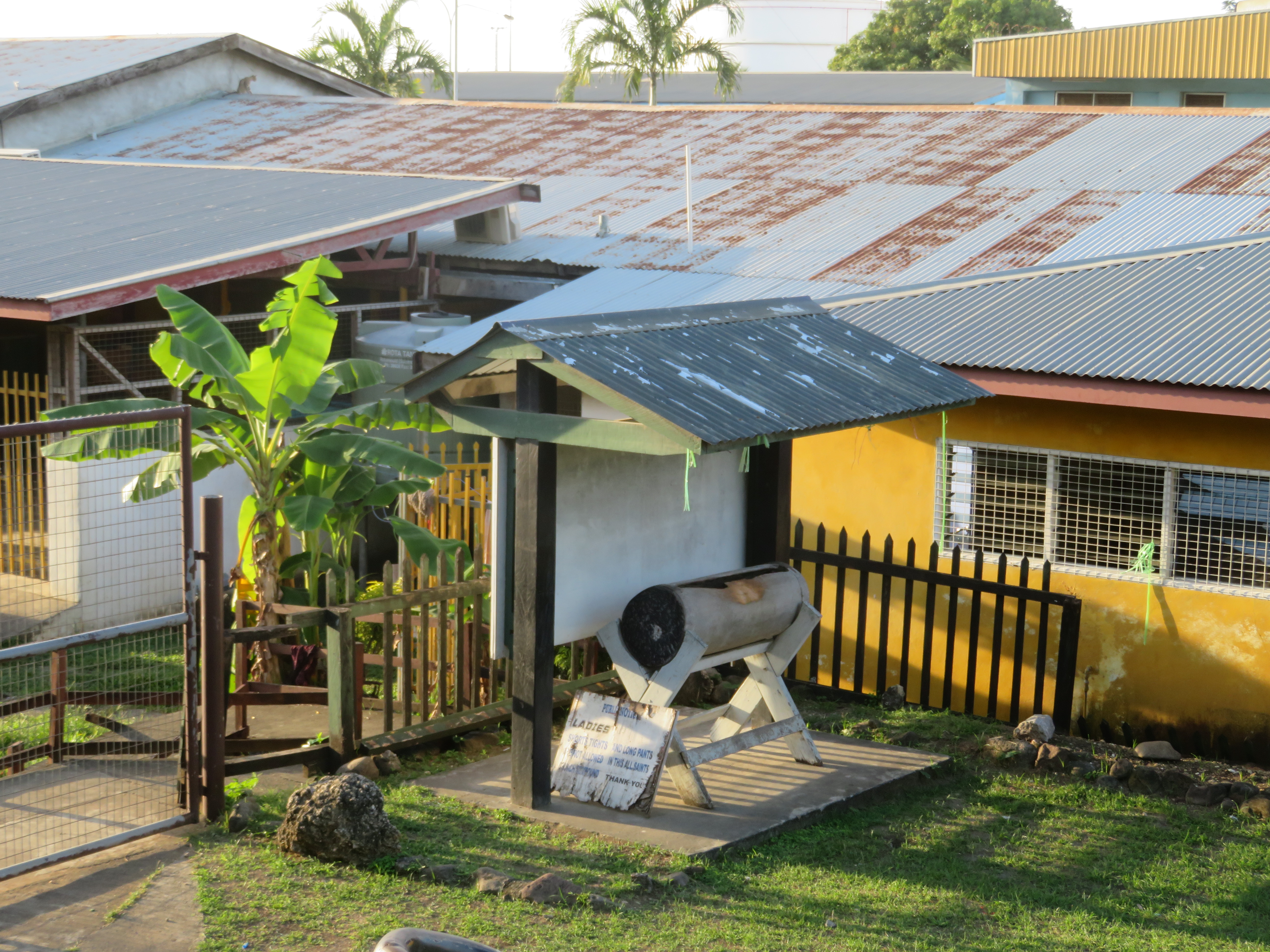
Drum at the entrance of All Saints Church

One of the largest churches in Honiara is the Cathedral Church of St Barnabas, Honiara, consecrated in 1969, which could seat nine hundred people. Holy Cross Cathedral, Honiara, consecrated in 1957, is a large Roman Catholic church on hill in the east of the centre. Originally All Saints Church, which is known for its choir and its colourful wall painting, was the cathedral of Honiara. The present building dates from 1971. At the entrance a large drum can be seen which is used to call the parish members for prayer.

=== Hotels and restaurants ===
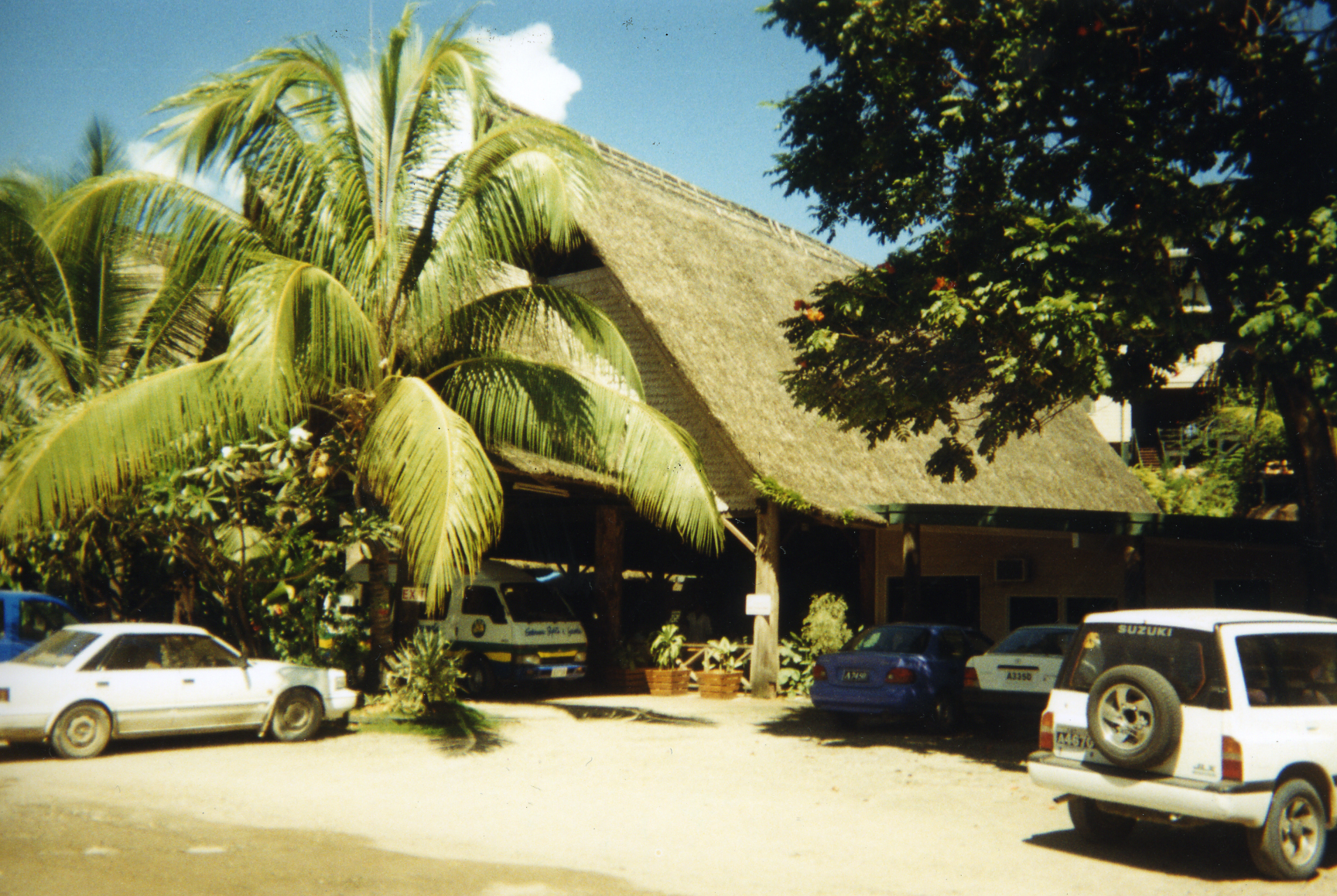
Honiara Hotel

Honiara Hotel is a traditional hotel and features a dance show on Friday nights. The Pacific Casino Hotel offers accommodation in both outdoor villas and indoor rooms, as well as a casino. The King Solomon Hotel can be found next to the Hibiscus apartment complex and has a restaurant and pool. The Heritage Hotel is a seaside hotel with a pool, outdoor bar, restaurant, and conference rooms. It lies between the Tenkai sushi restaurant, and Breakwater café. In the same street is the Palm Sugar café, which offers pizza and burgers.

== Culture ==
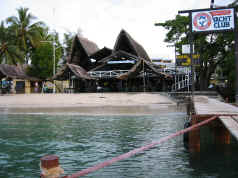
Honiara Yacht Club

In 1974, Polynesian Dances of Bellona (Mungiki), which included suahongi form, forbidden to be performed by the Seventh Day Adventist missionaries, was revived and recorded in Honiara. Suahongi is performed at the conclusion of the ritual of sharing in a ceremony called manga'e, (performed by men) of the surplus harvest of fishing and garden crops. The dance is performed to rhythmic songs which are in the form of a "feature call and response, speech–song", including the short history of the island of Bellona. The Melanesia Arts and Crafts Festival was held for the first time in Honaria in 1998 when five Melanesian Countries participated.

The present trend in dancing among the youth of the Islands and in Honiara also is freestyle dancing, which has become part of the night life and entertainment scene. These dances bear no resemblance to the traditional dance forms of the Solomon Islands, and are copied from the films You Got Served, the Step Up franchise and Stomp the Yard. Panpipe performances are held at the Mendana Hotel in Honiara every week. The Panpipe band is the Narasirato from Are'are in south Maleta. The Mao dancers from Kawara'ae, the Wasi Ka Nanara Pan Pipers, Tamure dancing, and Batikama Adventist bamboo band are other groups. Gilbertese dancing is also popular along with Panpipe music groups. Most of these dances are performed in the leading hotels of Honiara.

=== Religion ===
Honiara is predominantly Christian and is the headquarters of the Anglican Church of Melanesia, the Roman Catholic Archdiocese of Honiara, the South Seas Evangelical Church, the United Church, the Seventh-day Adventist Church and other Christian churches. There are many congregations of American and Australian style charismatic and evangelical movements. There are also members of the Baháʼí Faith, Buddhists, Jehovah's Witnesses, The Church of Jesus Christ of Latter-day Saints, and Muslims such as the Ahmadiyya Muslim Community.

The Anglican Church of Melanesia is a province of the Anglican Communion and was established in 1849 by George Selwyn, Bishop of New Zealand. Initially, it was the Church of the Province of New Zealand, but in 1975 it became part of the ecclesiastical Province of Melanesia that covers Solomon Islands, Vanuatu and the French Territory of New Caledonia in the South Western Pacific. The Church of Melanesia in Honiara operates three missions, the Melanesian Board of Mission, the Melanesian Brotherhood and the Mission to Seafarers Society from Honiara. The Melanesian Board of Mission oversees the Home Mission and the mission in other regional countries. The Most Reverend. David Vunagi has been archbishop of Melanesia since May 2009, when he formally took over the post at the Cathedral Church of St Barnabas, Honiara.

The Melanesian Brotherhood, established by Ini Kopuria on 28 October 1925, has offices in Honiara. It operates in East Asia, Australia and the Pacific, and Europe, and as of 2012 has 96 Brothers in active mission work. It is a Religious Community of the Anglican Communion, similar to other religious communities, committed to "vows of celibacy, obedience and poverty", by training young men into religious pursuits and evangelism. The Mission to Seafarers Society, also with its offices in Honiara, with its network of chaplain, honorary chaplain, staff, and helpers, communicates with seafarers in the Port of Honiara and many ports of the world with the objective of spiritual and practical welfare of seafarers belonging to many races and creeds, and their families.

== Sports ==
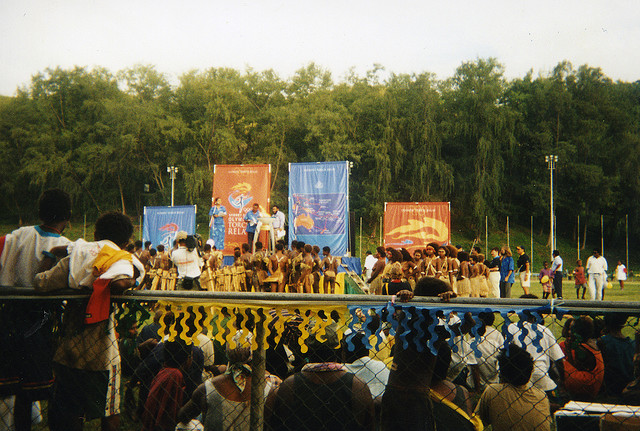
Lawson Tama Stadium

Honiara has three main stadiums, the largest of which is Lawson Tama Stadium, the national stadium of Solomon Islands. The stadium, funded by FIFA, is built into the hillside and can hold 10,000 people. The stadium hosted the 2012 OFC Nations Cup. The most recent and most prolific winners of the Telekom S-League, Koloale FC and Solomon Warriors FC, respectively, are both based out of the city.

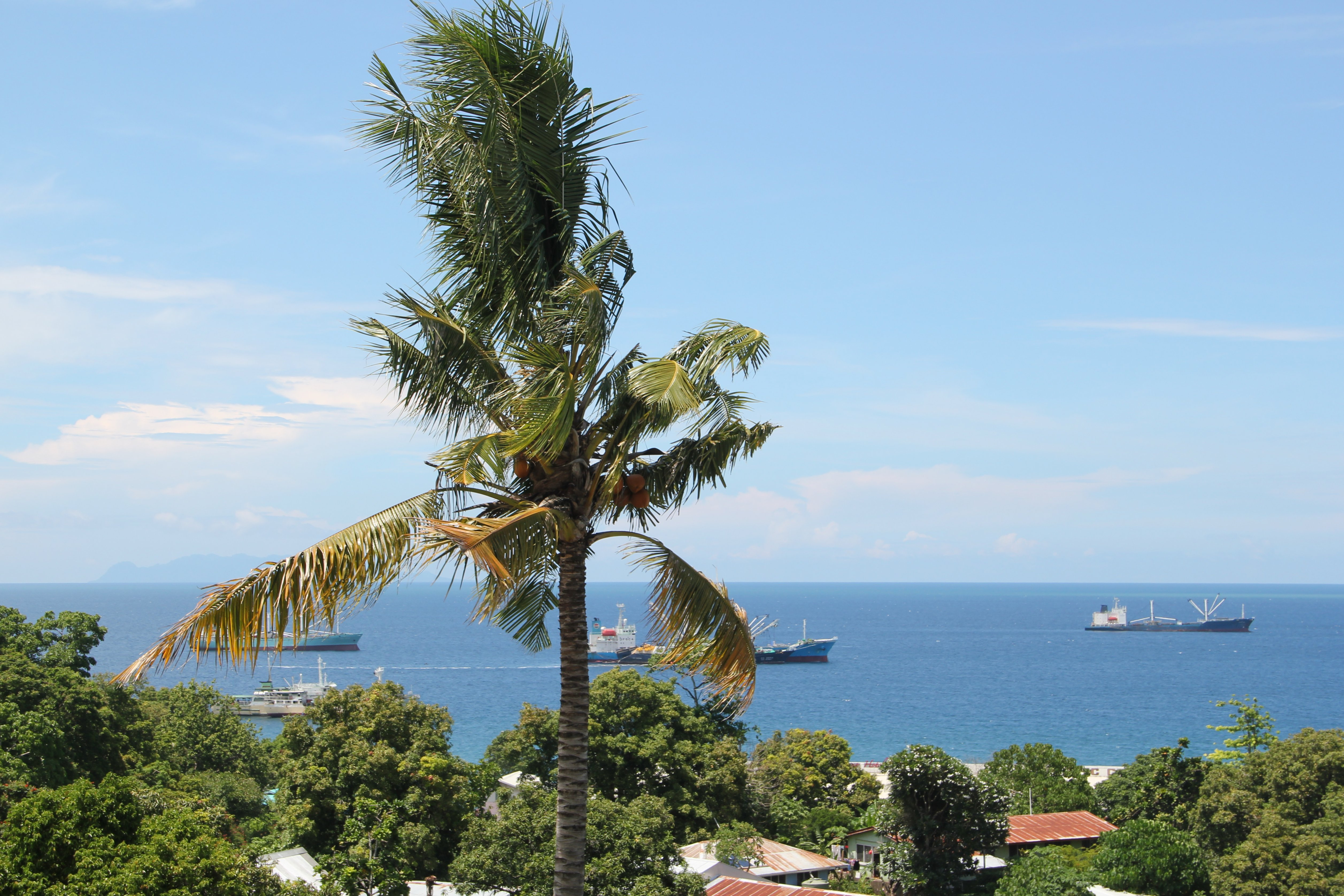
View of ships from a beach in Honiara.

Yachting is popular in Honiara and it contains the Point Cruz Yacht Club on the harbour. Honiara Golf Club lies on the eastern side of the town, not far from the Lunga River, near the King George VI High School (between Honiara and the airport) was initially nine-hole course on a flat land which was earlier an airstrip. An 18 tee 11-hole golf course was built in the late 1960s. Boxing, rugby, athletics, basketball, netball, and volleyball are also practised. Netball leagues are organised in Honiara for girls and is well-organized in surrounding larger villages, usually by women's clubs.

== Transport ==
The city lies on the Kukum Highway and is served by Honiara International Airport. Henderson Field, operated during the Solomon Islands campaign, was reopened in 1969 as the nation's largest airport. The airport has been improved to receive large aircraft. Solomon Airlines, the state owned airline, is based at Honiara.

The seaport of Point Cruz is the main port of entry into Solomon Islands. International shipping companies operate as the port has the facility to handle 20 feet (6.1 m) containers. Passenger boats services operate from Honiara's main wharf at Point Cruz and many shipping companies provide these services. Operators include the MV Pelican Express and MV Solomon Express, offering services once a week to Malaita and the western provincial cities of Mbunikalo, Seghe, Noro, and Gizo. The 26-hour boat trip to Gizo is said to be one of the most scenic of the Pacific.

== Twin towns – sister cities ==
- Luganville, Vanuatu
- Mackay, Queensland, Australia
- Jiangmen, China
- Majuro, Marshall Islands

== See also ==
- Chamburu

== Bibliography ==
- Selbach, Rachel; Cardoso, Hugo C.; Van Den Berg, Margot (2009). Gradual Creolization: Studies Celebrating Jacques Arends. John Benjamins Publishing. ISBN 978-90-272-5256-2.
- Bennett, Judith A. (1987). Wealth of the Solomons: A History of a Pacific Archipelago, 1800–1978. University of Hawaii Press. ISBN 978-0-8248-1078-8.
- Cooper, Chris; Hall, Colin Michael (2005). Oceania: A Tourism Handbook. Channel View Publications. ISBN 978-1-873150-87-0.
- Crocombe, R. G. (2007). Asia in the Pacific Islands: Replacing the West. editorips@usp.ac.fj. ISBN 978-982-02-0388-4.
- Degan, Patrick (1 May 2003). Flattop Fighting in World War II: The Battles Between American and Japanese Aircraft Carriers. McFarland. ISBN 978-0-7864-1451-2.
- Elevitch, Craig R. (1 June 2006). Traditional Trees of Pacific Islands: Their Culture, Environment, and Use. PAR. ISBN 978-0-9702544-5-0.
- Gina, Lloyd Maepeza (2003). Journeys in a Small Canoe: The Life and Times of a Solomon Islander. editorips@usp.ac.fj. ISBN 978-1-74076-032-4.
- Govan, Hugh (1995). Cymatium Muricinum and Other Ranellid Gastropods: Major Predators of Cultured Tridacnid Clams. The WorldFish Center. ISBN 978-971-8709-70-2.
- Great Britain. Foreign and Commonwealth Office (1976). British Solomon Islands Protectorate: Report for the Year. H.M.S.O. for the Foreign and Commonwealth Office. ISBN 978-0-11-580182-2.
- Hargis, Robert (21 August 2012). World War II Medal of Honor Recipients (1): Navy & USMC. Osprey Publishing. ISBN 978-1-78200-206-2.
- Huisken, Ron; Thatcher, Meredith (2007). History as Policy: Framing the debate on the future of Australia's defence policy. ANU E Press. ISBN 978-1-921313-56-1.
- Isom, Dallas Woodbury (1 July 2007). Midway Inquest: Why the Japanese Lost the Battle of Midway. Indiana University Press. ISBN 978-0-253-34904-0.
- Kiste, Robert C. (1998). He Served: A Biography of Macu Salato. editorips@usp.ac.fj. ISBN 978-982-02-0133-0.
- Kupiainen, Jari (2000). Tradition, trade and woodcarving in Solomon Islands. Finnish Anthropological Society. ISBN 978-952-9573-23-3.
- Kortmann, Bernd; Schneider, Edgar W. (2004). A handbook of varieties of English, Volume 2. Walter de Gruyter. ISBN 978-3-11-017532-5.
- Lemps, Christian Huetz de (1 January 1984). Un jeune État mélanésien: Les Îles Salomon (in French). Presses Univ de Bordeaux. ISBN 978-2-905081-03-2.
- McKinnon, Rowan; Carillet, Jean-Bernard; Starnes, Dean (2008). Papua New Guinea & Solomon Islands. Lonely Planet. ISBN 9781741045802.
- McKinnon, Rowan (1 August 2009). South Pacific. Lonely Planet. ISBN 978-1-74104-786-8.
- Office, Great Britain. Foreign and Commonwealth (1976). British Solomon Islands Protectorate: Report for the Year. H.M.S.O. for the Foreign and Commonwealth Office. ISBN 978-0-11-580182-2.
- Planet, Lonely (1 October 2010). The Travel Book: A Journey Through Every Country in the World. Lonely Planet. ISBN 978-1-74179-211-9.
- Room, Adrian (2006). Placenames of the World: Origins and Meanings of the Names for 6,600 Countries, Cities, Territories, Natural Features, and Historic Sites. McFarland. ISBN 978-0-7864-2248-7.
- Sofield, Trevor H. B. (12 June 2003). Empowerment for Sustainable Tourism Development. Emerald Group Publishing. ISBN 978-0-08-043946-4.
- Stanley, David (3 December 2004). Moon Handbooks South Pacific. David Stanley. ISBN 978-1-56691-411-6.
- Stanley, David (2000). Moon Handbooks South Pacific. David Stanley. ISBN 9781566911726.
- Treadaway, Julian (2007). Dancing, Dying, Crawling, Crying: Stories of Continuity and Change in the Polynesian Community of Tikopia. editorips@usp.ac.fj. ISBN 978-982-01-0813-4.
- States, United (2007). Treaties in Force: A List of Treaties and Other International Agreements of the United States in Force on January 1, 2007. Government Printing Office. ISBN 978-0-16-079737-8.
- Williams, Barbara (30 September 2004). World War II Pacific. Twenty-First Century Books. ISBN 978-0-8225-0138-1.
