= Honiara Solomon Islands College of Higher Education =

University in Honiara, Solomon Islands

Coordinates: 9°26′6.33″S 159°57′4.46″E

Honiara Solomon Islands National University
- Type: Public
- Location: Honiara, Solomon Islands
- Website: Siche.edu.sb

Honiara Solomon Islands College of Higher Education (SICHE) is a university in Honiara, Solomon Islands; apart from the University of the South Pacific, which has a satellite campus in the country. It is located in eastern Honiara, south of Honiara Golf Club, just to the southwest of King George VI National High School.

== Background ==
Specialising in technical and vocational learning/education, it has achieved the onerous task of putting together many training institutions run by concerned ministries of the government of Solomon Islands. A 1984 Act of Parliament called the Solomon Islands College of Higher Education Act enabled this change; the institutions brought under its purview as a College of Higher Education are the Islands Teachers College, Public Administration Training School, Ranadi Marine Training School, Honiara Nursing Training School, and Honiara Technical Institute which have all been reconstituted as the School of Education (SOE), the School of Finance & Administration (SFA), the School of Marine & Fisheries Studies (SMFS), the School Nursing and Health Studies (SNHS), the School of Industrial Development(SID) and the School of Natural Resources (SNR). With revision of the Act in 2008, which also authorised the college authorities to introduce any schools in other disciplines, the School of Tourism and Hospitality (STH), the School of Humanities, Science, and Media (SHSM) have also been established.

The government appoints the Council Chairs for governing the college with members selected by the government as appointees representing various fields of studies from public and private sectors and elected members, including "heads, lecturers, non-academic staff and students." The management team comprises the Director as the Chief Executive (CEO) of SICHE supported by a Deputy and a team of senior officers, heads of schools and Divisional Managers. SICHE has set guidelines for running the college with the Academic Board overseeing all academic decisions and plans from schools' Board of Studies and seeking the approval of Council. SICHE has a Strategic Plan 2011–2015 for the developmental activities of the college. The college has collaborated with the University of the South Pacific, Fiji, which has its main campus at Suva.

== Programmes ==
The college has four campuses at Kukum, Panatina, Ranadi and Poitete. The medium of instruction is English, which is the case for all educational institutions in Solomon Islands. The College of Higher Education runs courses up to degree level. It also caters to the requirement at the lower and middle level human resource needs of the country. The trade centre affiliated with the college provides training to workers in trades such as carpentry, car maintenance and sheet metal working.

The major infrastructure development envisaged for the year 2012 involve the Lecture hall at Kukum Campus, security fencing around the fencing of both Kukum and Panat campuses, and infrastructure upgrading in the three main campuses.

The 11th Festival of Pacifica Arts was planned to be conducted at the college campus in July 2012 with Panatina Campus as the main festival venue. The Kukum, Panatin and Randi campuses were also proposed to be used for accommodating the guests for the festival.
