= Gilbertese dancing =

Melanesian and Polynesian dance and music style

Gilbertese dancing, which is accompanied by singing, is a characteristic dance style of the Melanesians and the Polynesians. It is a fusion of folk and ballad dance forms. Rhythm in the music is accentuated by beating with hand the upturned wooden boxes. It is also called "I-Kiribati dancing". it was part of people's cultural identity; missionaries tried to suppress the dancing as they found it scandalous.

== See also ==
- List of ethnic, regional, and folk dances by origin
