= Tanaghai =

- Village
- Location in Guadalcanal
- Coordinates: 9°25′14″S 159°54′2″E
- Country: Solomon Islands
- Province: Guadalcanal
- Island: Guadalcanal
- Time zone: UTC+11 (UTC)

Tanaghai is a village in Guadalcanal, Solomon Islands. It is located 6.7 kilometres (4.2 mi) by road west of downtown Honiara. The Poha River flows into the sea in the north of the village.

== History ==
According to Zoleveke (1981) during WW2 the main United States Marine Corps HQ was located at Tanaghai where the mission station is situated.

During the tensions the women peace-builders played an active role, particularly at Tanaghai:

"When we came up there were shootings but we just went up. When we got to the Banker then one of the Commanders asked the militants to put their guns down, so the militants did and we prayed and shared God's word together. After the prayer, the Commander thanked us and then we shook hands and we were all very emotional and cried. One of their Commanders said 'thank you very much to you all mums for the sharing'. One of the things the Commander said was to pray for the GRA militants, but we said to them we already did on our way to you and of course we will always pray for both groups."
