= Squatting in Fiji =

Unauthorized occupation of land or buildings in Fiji

Fiji on the globe

Squatting in Fiji is defined as being "a resident of a dwelling which is illegal according to planning by-laws regardless of whether the landowner has given consent". As of 2018, an estimated 20% of the total population was squatting, including people living on land owned by indigenous clans with informal permission (Fijian language: Vakavanua). Most squatters are on the larger islands such as Vanua Levu and Viti Levu.

== History ==
Fiji is an island country with 110 inhabited islands. As with other Pacific islands, urbanization and lack of governance have created issues for an expanding number of squatters, of which there were an estimated 90,000 to 100,000 in 2009. Development Plan 8 stated that a squatter is "a resident of a dwelling which is illegal according to planning by-laws regardless of whether the landowner has given consent".

In Fiji, 87% of the land mass is owned by indigenous clans under the Native Land Register (Fijian language: Vola ni Kawa Bula). The state owns 6% and the remaining 7% can be bought and sold. Originally, most squatting occurred on state land and now tribal lands are also squatted. Squatters on tribal lands tend to do so with informal permission (Fijian: Vakavanua), whereas squatters on the remaining 13% are more akin to the global view of squatters. The looseness in the definition of who is squatting can make it harder to generate accurate statistics.

Informal settlements are found on larger islands such as Vanua Levu and Viti Levu, where most of the population of Fiji lives. A 2003 report found the ethnicity of squatters was roughly half indigenous Fijian and half Indo-Fijian. When agricultural licenses were not renewed from the 1990s onwards, this displaced former farmers who the government attempted to rehouse and another crisis was caused by the decline of the garment industry in the 2000s; many people then started squatting in Lautoka and Suva, often living in areas where there are environmental dangers.

In 2018, the Fijian government announced a program to improve housing in which squatters can become eligible for grants. There were an estimated 230 informal settlements, housing 20% of the total population.
