= Oceanian literature =

Oceanian (Australasian, Melanesian, Micronesian, and Polynesian) literature developed in a unique geographical environment that allowed the development of a unique literature to thrive. Oceanian literature was heavily influenced by religion, ritual and colonization. This can be seen by the large amount of religious symbolism and political activism featured in it.

Another major influence in Oceanian society was its intricate oral tradition. For a long time, most Oceanian literature was not written down. As a result, stock formulas and rhyming were used in many works (these traits made it easier to memorize). Gods, creation myths, and spirits are also prominent in Oceanian literature, showcasing again the influence oral tradition had on the literature of Oceania.

Modern Oceanian literature is mainly written in the English language but also feature different languages and speech. The literatures of Oceania, particularly during the return to many island nations’ independence in the 1960s and 1970s, were often strongly political and invested in finding literary expression for new independent, interconnected Pacific lives. Oceanian writers drew on a wide, translational pool of references, with African, American, European and Indian literatures often productively woven into their texts. The ocean carries a lot of symbolism and meaning to the cultures and people that have travelled through, in which largely has impacted the literary cultures and historical narratives in Oceania.

== List of countries and territories ==
- American Samoan literature
- Australian literature
- Christmas Islander literature
- Cocos (Keeling) Islander literature
- Cook Islands literature
- Easter Islander literature
- Fijian literature
- French Polynesian literature
- Guamanian literature
- Hawaiian literature
- I-Kiribati literature
- Marshall Islander literature
- Micronesian literature
- Nauruan literature
- New Caledonian literature
- New Zealand literature
- Niuean literature
- Norfolk Islander literature
- Northern Mariana Islander literature
- Palauan literature
- Papua New Guinean literature
- Pitcairn Islander literature
- Samoan literature
- Solomon Islands literature
- Tokelauan literature
- Tongan literature
- Tuvaluan literature
- Vanuatuan literature
- Wallis and Futuna Islander literature

== Prominent writers by country ==
=== Australia ===
- Thea Astley
- Geoffrey Blainey
- Manning Clark
- Marcus Clarke
- Miles Franklin
- Peggy Frew
- Helen Garner
- Germaine Greer
- Robert Hughes
- Barry Humphries
- Clive James
- Elizabeth Jolley
- Gail Jones
- Jill Ker Conway
- Thomas Keneally
- Henry Lawson
- Nam Le
- David Malouf
- Colleen McCullough
- Andrew McGahan
- Alex Miller
- Banjo Paterson
- Christina Stead
- Morris West
- Patrick White
- David Williamson
- Tim Winton
- Markus Zusak

=== Fiji ===
- Raymond Pillai
- Subramani
- Pio Manoa
- Peter Thomson
- Mikaele M.K. Yasa

=== French Polynesia ===
- Flora Devantine
- Titaua Peu
- Chantal Spitz

=== Kiribati ===
- Teweiariki Teaero

=== Marshall Islands ===
- Bob Barclay
- Daniel A. Kelin II
- Jack Niedenthal
- Dirk R. Spennemann

=== Micronesia, Federated States of ===
- Luelen Bernart

=== Nauru ===
- Timothy Detudamo
- Ben Bam Solomon

=== New Zealand ===
- Eleanor Catton
- Alan Duff
- Janet Frame
- Patricia Grace
- Charlotte Grimshaw
- Keri Hulme
- Lloyd Jones
- Maurice Shadbolt
- Witi Ihimaera

=== Palau ===
- Susan Kloulechad

=== Papua New Guinea ===
- Nora Vagi Brash
- Vincent Eri
- Albert Maori Kiki
- Ignatius Kilage
- Loujaya Kouza
- Bernard Narokobi
- Russell Soaba
- Michael Somare
- Nash Sorariba
- Regis Stella
- Steven Edmund Winduo
- Arthur Jawodimbari
- Kumalau Tawali
- Peter Kama Kerpi
- Tony Wanim Kagl
- John Waiko
- John Kasaipwalova
- Jack Lahui

=== Samoa ===
- Tuiatua Tupua Tamasese Tufuga Efi
- Sia Figiel
- Dan Taulapapa McMullin
- Misa Telefoni Retzlaff
- Albert Wendt
- Lani Wendt Young

=== Solomon Islands ===
- Celo Kulagoe
- Rexford Orotaloa
- John Saunana

=== Tonga ===
- Epeli Hau'ofa
- Konai Helu Thaman
- Joshua Taumoefolau

=== Tuvalu ===
- Afaese Manoa

=== Vanuatu ===
- Marcel Melthérorong
- Grace Molisa
- Sethy Regenvau

== See also ==
- African literature
- Asian literature
- Latin American literature
- Oceanian culture
- Western literature

== Citations ==
- 'Oceanic literature', Guiart, Jean in Encyclopædia Britannica. Retrieved on December 14, 2007.
- Goetzfridt, Nicholas J. (1995). Indigenous Literature of Oceania: A Survey of Criticism and Interpretation, Westport, CT: Greenwood Press.
