= List of Oceanian writers =

Writers who have contributed to Oceanian literature include:

A B C D E F G H I J K L M N O P Q R S T U V W X Y Z

== A ==
- Thea Astley

== B ==
- Luelen Bernart
- Geoffrey Blainey

== C ==
- Eleanor Catton
- Manning Clark
- Marcus Clarke

== D ==
- Timothy Detudamo
- Flora Devantine
- Alan Duff

== E ==
- Vincent Eri

== F ==
- Sia Figiel
- Miles Franklin
- Janet Frame

== G ==
- Helen Garner
- Patricia Grace
- Germaine Greer
- Charlotte Grimshaw

== H ==
- Epeli Hau'ofa
- Konai Helu Thaman
- Robert Hughes
- Keri Hulme
- Barry Humphries

== I ==
- Witi Ihimaera

== J ==
- Clive James
- Elizabeth Jolley
- Gail Jones
- Lloyd Jones

== K ==
- Jill Ker Conway
- Thomas Keneally
- Albert Maori Kiki
- Ignatius Kilage
- Loujaya Kouza

== L ==
- Henry Lawson
- Nam Le

== M ==
- David Malouf
- Afaese Manoa
- Colleen McCullough
- Andrew McGahan
- Alex Miller
- Grace Molisa

== N ==
- Bernard Narokobi

== P ==
- Banjo Paterson
- Craig Santos Perez

== R ==
- Misa Telefoni Retzlaff
- Robert Louis Stevenson

== S ==
- Maurice Shadbolt
- Russell Soaba
- Michael Somare
- Christina Stead

== W ==
- Albert Wendt
- Morris West
- Patrick White
- David Williamson
- Tim Winton

== Z ==
- Markus Zusak

== See also ==
- Category:Lists of Australian writers
- List of New Zealand writers
