= Culture of the Solomon Islands archipelago =

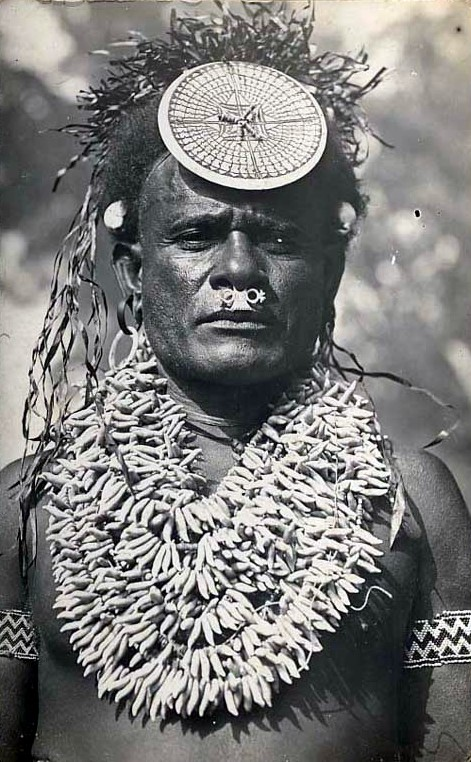
Solomon Islands chief wearing a porpoise tooth chest ornament and kap-kap. Portrait of Irobaoa of Suafa, north Malaita, circa 1910.

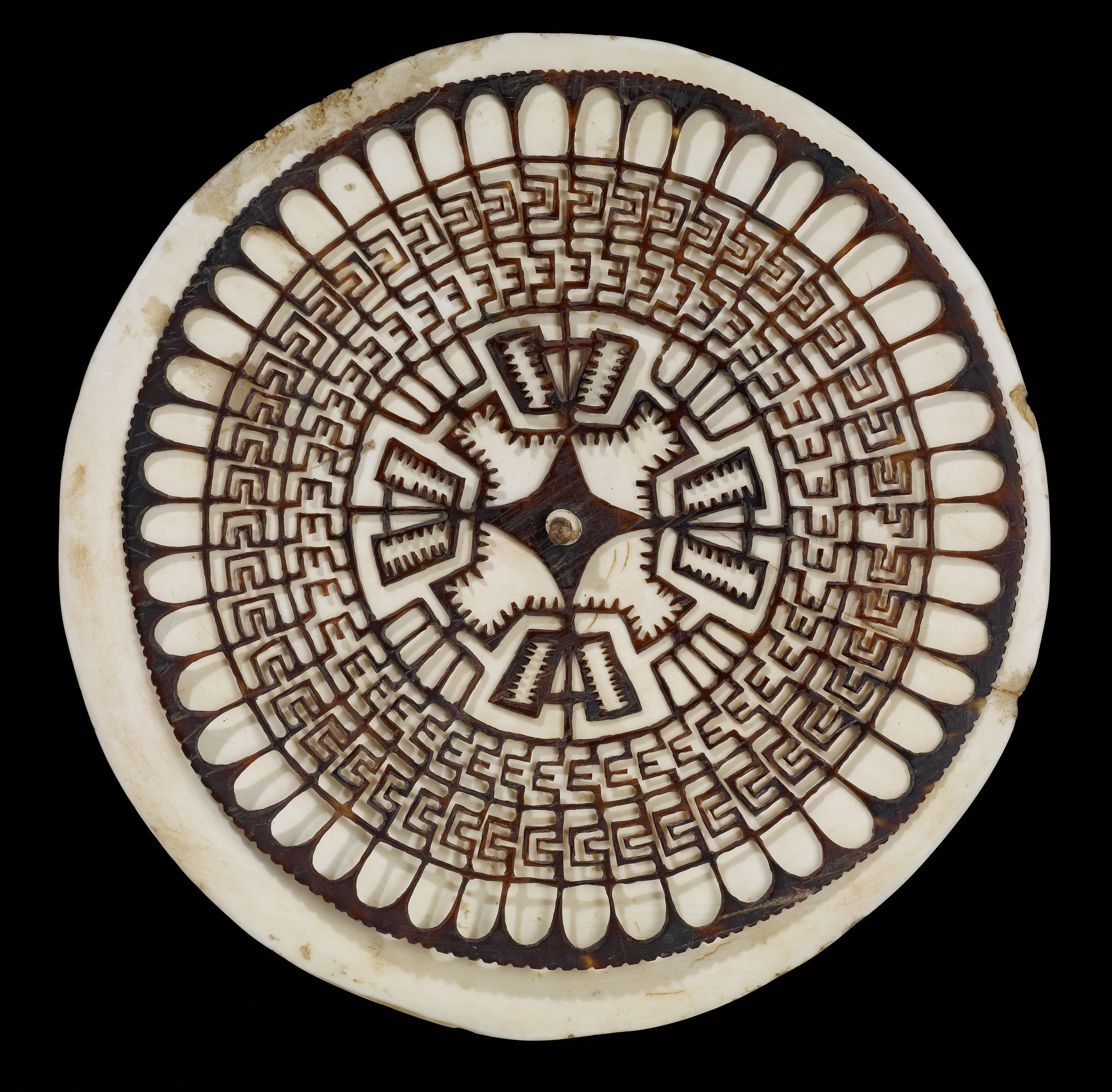
Kapkap, 19th century, Solomon Islands

The culture of the Solomon Islands reflects the extent of the differentiation and diversity among the groups living within the Solomon Islands archipelago, which lies within Melanesia in the Pacific Ocean, with the peoples distinguished by island, language, topography, and geography. The cultural area includes the nation state of Solomon Islands and the Bougainville Island, which is a part of Papua New Guinea.

The Solomon Islands includes some culturally Polynesian societies which lie outside the main region of Polynesian influence, known as the Polynesian Triangle. There are seven Polynesian outliers within the Solomon Islands: Anuta, Bellona, Ontong Java, Rennell, Sikaiana, Tikopia, and Vaeakau-Taumako.

== Traditional culture ==
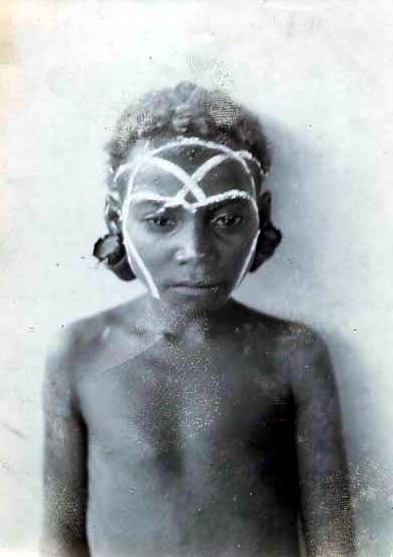
Vella Lavella girl with painted face and shell ear ornaments, c. 1900.

In the traditional culture of the Solomon Islands age-old customs are handed down from one generation to the next, allegedly from the ancestral spirits themselves, to form the cultural values of Solomon Islands.

=== Tepukei (ocean-going outrigger canoes) ===
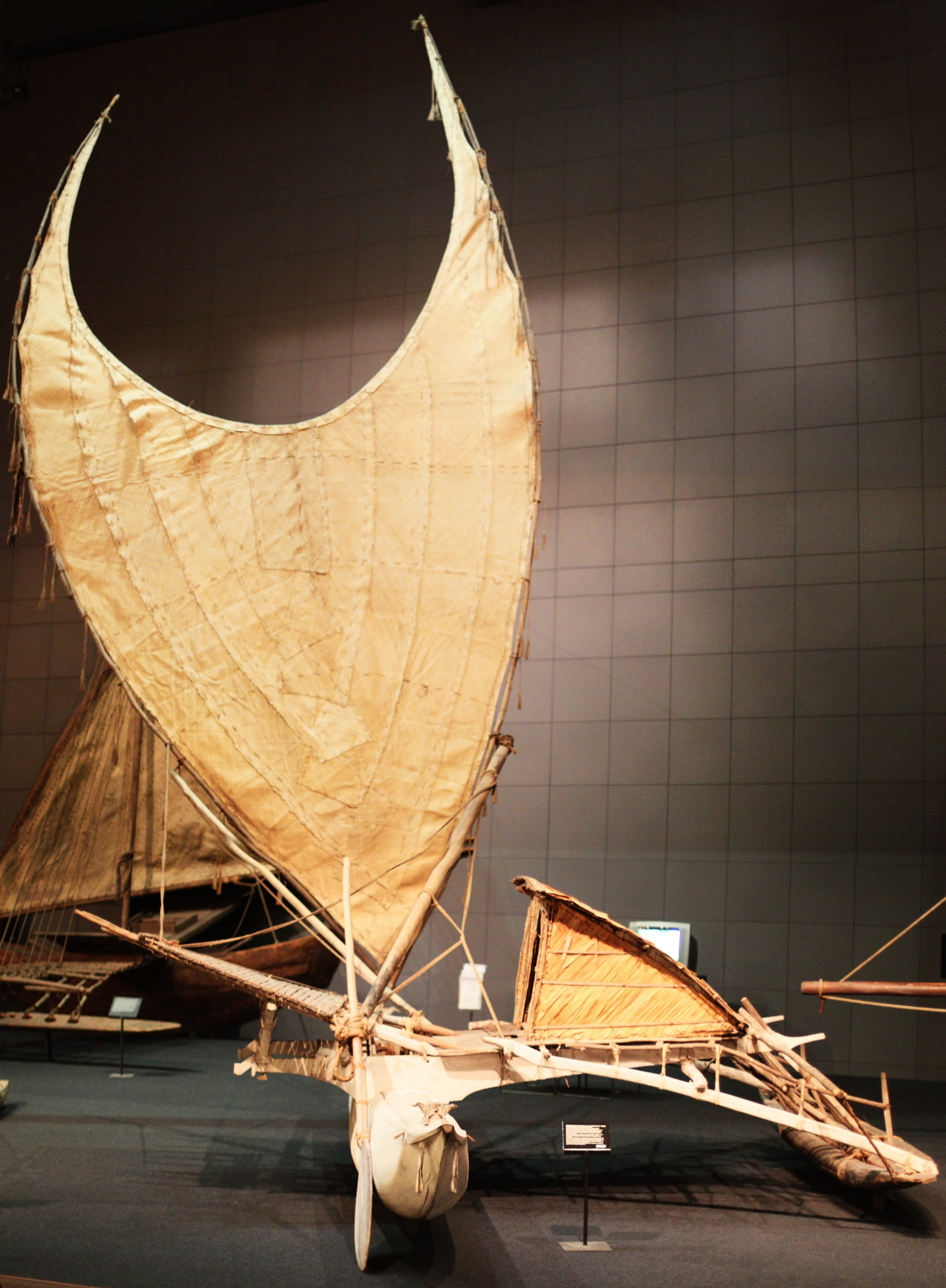
A Tepukei (ocean-going outrigger canoe) from the Santa Cruz Islands.

Some Polynesian societies of eastern Solomon Islands built ocean-going outrigger canoes known as Tepukei. In 1966 Gerd Koch, a German anthropologist, carried out research at Graciosa Bay on Nendö Island (Ndende/Ndeni) in the Santa Cruz Islands and on Pileni and Fenualoa in the Reef Islands, and returned with documentary film, photographic and audio material. The films that Koch completed are now held by the German National Library of Science and Technology (TIB) in Hanover.

He brought back to the Ethnological Museum of Berlin the last still complete Tepukei from the Santa Cruz Islands.

== Contemporary culture ==
In the contemporary Solomon Islands, as elsewhere in Melanesia, kastom is the core of the assertion of traditional values and cultural practices in a modern context. The Kastom Gaden Association, for example, advocates growing and eating traditional foods rather than imported ones.

== Languages ==
English is the official language, yet its use is limited among natives in casual contexts. It is used in the country's internal politics, foreign affairs and in some professional environments. Some educational institutions use English, such as in Chung Wah school and Woodford International School, but most are limited to Pijin.

Solomon Islands Pijin is the primary language, used in the country's capital Honiara and, to a lesser extent, in other provinces. The language consists principally of a combination of English-derived and indigenous vocabulary, hence its common label among foreigners "Broken English". Pijin uses a phonemic orthographic system; in written form, the language has the appearance of spoken English written phonetically. "Rice", for example, becomes "Rais". Some traces of Spanish influence can be found in the language, including the word "saveh", to know, which is similar to the Spanish "saber", of the same meaning.

There is a large variety of languages in the Solomons and, with the exception of Pijin, they tend to be limited to individual tribes. Tribes in the same geographical regions tend to understand each other's languages better, but the need for Pijin becomes evident when people from different tribes interact, such as in the capital; where it allows Solomon Islanders from a multitude of backgrounds to communicate in casual and professional settings.

== Notable figures ==
Notable figures in contemporary Solomon Islands culture include painter Ake Lianga and musician Sharzy. Writers include John Saunana, Rexford Orotaloa, and Celo Kulagoe.

== Sport ==
Many Solomon Islanders are passionate about sport, and it forms a major part of the country's culture in terms of spectating and participation.

== Folklore ==
Solomon Islanders stories and legends have a cultural significance independent of their empirical truth or falsehood.

== See also ==
- Music of Solomon Islands
- Solomon Islands dance
- Solomon Islands literature
- Languages of the Solomon Islands archipelago
- Religion in Solomon Islands
