= Solomon Islands literature =

Solomon Islands literature began in the 1960s.

== History ==
The emergence of Solomon Islands written literature (as distinct from oral literature) took place in the context of the development of indigenous Pacific Islander literature in the Pacific region as a whole, beginning in the late 1960s. In 1968, the founding of the University of the South Pacific in Suva provided a stimulus for Pacific Islander literary aspirations.

Creative writing courses and workshops were set up. The South Pacific Arts Society was founded at the university in 1973, and published Pacific Islander literature (poetry and short stories) in the magazine Pacific Islands Monthly. In 1974, the Society founded the publishing house Mana Publications, followed in 1976 by the art and literature journal Mana. The journal published the first anthologies of Solomon Islands poetry.

Notable Solomon Islands writers include John Saunana, Rexford Orotaloa, and Celo Kulagoe. Saunana's book The Alternative was the first novel by a Solomon Islander; Orotaloa's Two Time Resurrection was the second. The Solomon Islands literary community has produced few novels, and generally favors short stories. In the journal Ariel, Robert Viking O'Brien has suggested that this is in part because most of the writers in the region came from the educated elite, as well as the fact that the short story is closer in spirit to the traditional tale. Both Sauanana and Orotaloa's novels explore the uneasy relationship between traditional island culture and the influence of European capitalist and colonialist pressures.

== See also ==
- Culture of the Solomon Islands
