= Point Cruz =

- Suburb
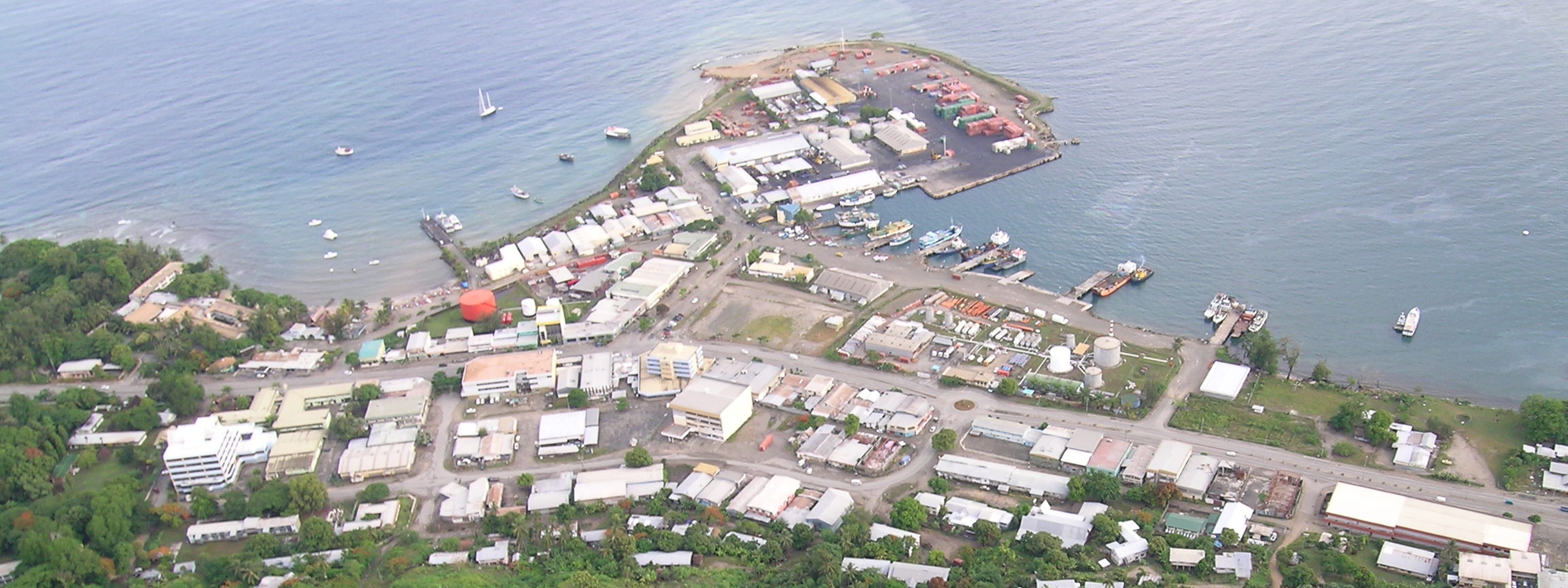
- Aerial of Point Cruz

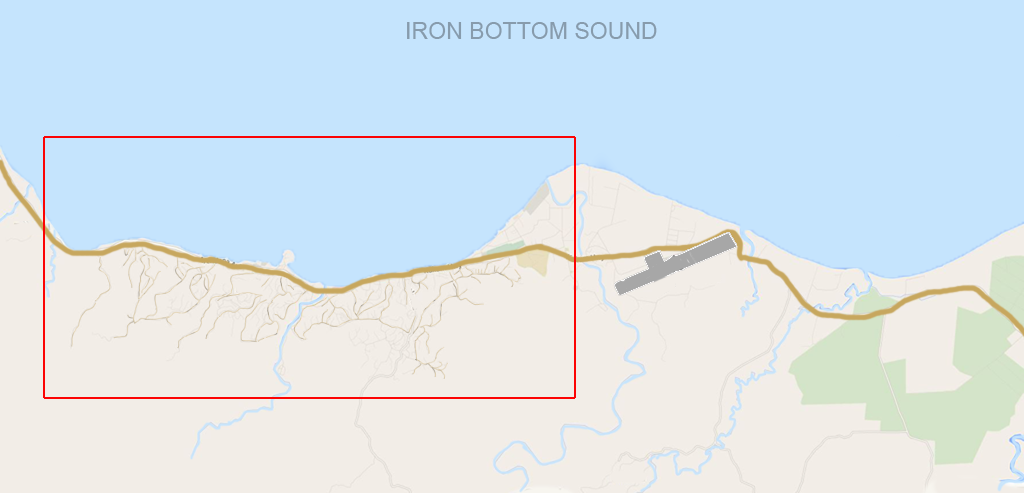
- Location in Honiara (Council boundary-red box)
- Coordinates: 9°26′S 159°57′E
- Country: Solomon Islands
- Province: Honiara Town
- Island: Guadalcanal
- Ward: Vavaea
- Elevation: 29–100 m (95–328 ft)
- Time zone: UTC+11 (UTC)

Point Cruz is a peninsula in the center of Honiara, on Guadalcanal Island. Honiara is the capital city of the Solomon Islands. Point Cruz is located on the Tandai Highway, and is ¼ mile north of the Solomon Islands Parliament Building. Point Cruz is in the Honiara City Council ward of Cruz, and is east of Town Ground and west of Tuvaruhu.

== Nomenclature ==
Point Cruz (Ghari language name: naho-ni-ara; translation, "facing the east and southeast trade winds") is the CBD area of 'Honiara' which is a Ghari language name for the piece of land west of Point Cruz

== History ==
The Point Cruz peninsular and surrounding areas were the locations for many battles during the Guadalcanal Campaign.

In March 1959 the Royal yacht HMY Britannia docked at the Point Cruz wharf as part of the Royal visit by HRH Prince Philip, Duke of Edinburgh

== Central Business District ==
Several government and business offices are situated in the suburb.

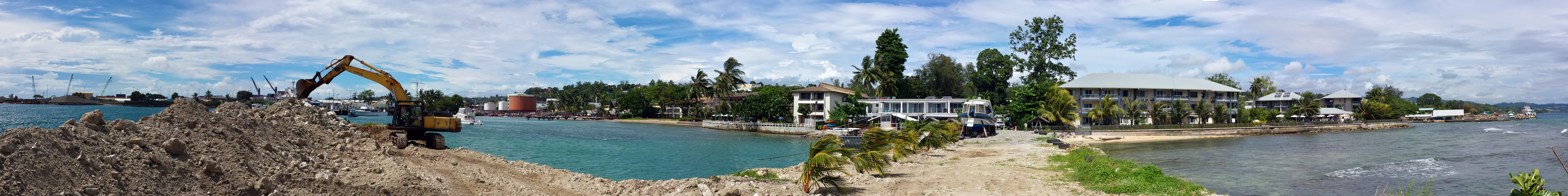
Panorama of Breakwater, Honiara. Nahoniara point (right) and Mbokona Bay (left). Breakwater cafe, Sol Mendana Hotel and Heritage hotel center.

=== Telecom ===
The Solomon Telekom Company Limited (Our Telekom) was founded in 1988 and is a joint venture company between Solomon Islands National Provident Fund, (SINPF) which hold 64.74% of the shares, and Cable & Wireless Plc of the United Kingdom which holds 32.58% of shares and the Investment Corporation of the Solomon Islands (ICSI) which owns 2.68% of the shares. On the 15 October 2014 Cable & Wireless Communications divested 32.577% shareholding in Solomon Telekom Company Limited ("Soltel") to the Solomon Islands National Provident Fund Board for total cash proceeds of approximately US$16.5 million.

Improvements in rural mobile network coverage have been made with the deployment of many towers constructed through the islands.

In 2008 the first Solomon Islander, Loyley Ngira was appointed as chief executive officer.

The Solomon Telekom Co average download speed is 709 kbit/s (89 kB/s).

=== Central Police Station ===
Following the cessation of the Guadalcanal Campaign the Solomon Islands Protectorate Government relocated from Lungga Plantation to Point Cruz. The Secretariat long leaf building was opposite the present Central Police Station and contained the post office and telecommunications office while the Public Works Department was located at the site of Central Police Station.

After the April 2006 riots and the arrest of Charles Dausabea a makeshift court upstairs of the Central Police Station was established for 20 persons charged arising from last week's civil strife.

In 1966 new accommodation was built for police officers behind Central Police Station and consisted of a block for single men and eight married quarters.

On 25 March 2010 the Taiwanese navy ships, Wu-Yi and Kuen Ming visited Honiara and several Navy volunteers assisted paint the Central Police Station.

=== NPF Plaza ===
In the 1950s the site was the location of the Woodford International School.

In 2008 a young man preaching at NPF Plaza was heckled by another young man. Shortly after a citrus plant from NFP fell on the heckler where he later died.

=== Anthony Saru Building ===
The Anthony Saru building was named after the South Malaitan MP who won the 1970 general election and unsuccessfully contested the Small Malaita Constituency in 1973.

Anthony Saru successfully moved a motion in Parliament for the introduction of a savings scheme in a form of a provident fund on the 27 November 1970 and in 1976 the Solomon Island National Provident Fund (SINPF) Social Security Scheme was established.

=== NPF Building ===
- Solomon Island National Provident Fund HQ
- Embassy of Japan

=== LKP Building ===
- Delegation of the European Union to Solomon Islands and Vanuatu

=== Other locations ===
- All Saints Church
- Anglican Church
- Franciscan Rooms
- Quality Motel
- Honiara Casino
Photos of Point Cruz CBD landmarks
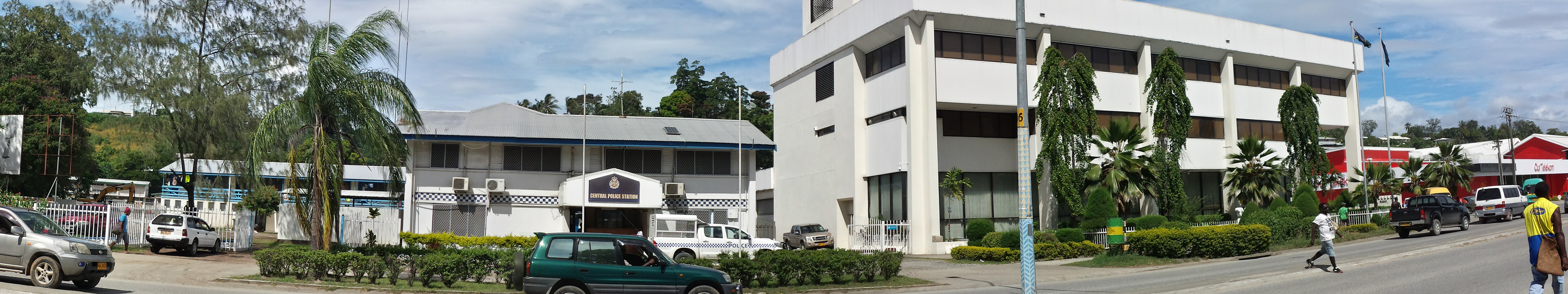
Central Police Station and Central Bank

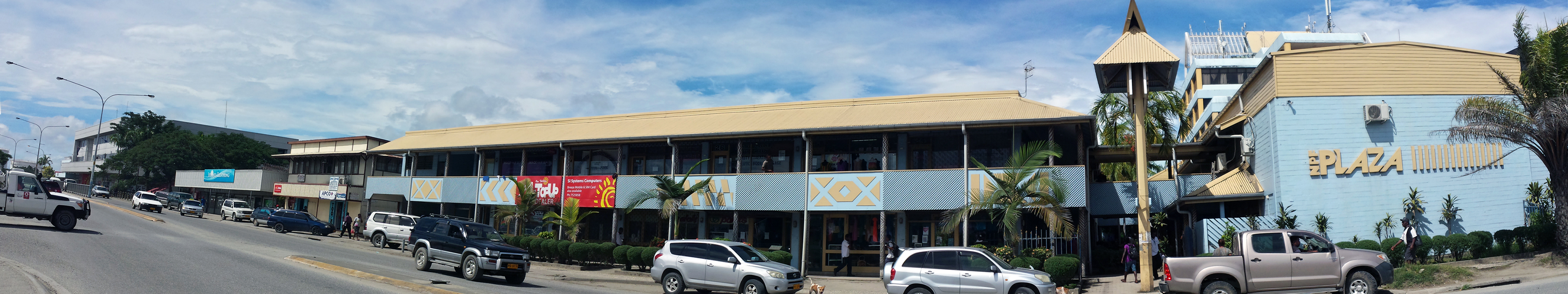
NPF Plaza

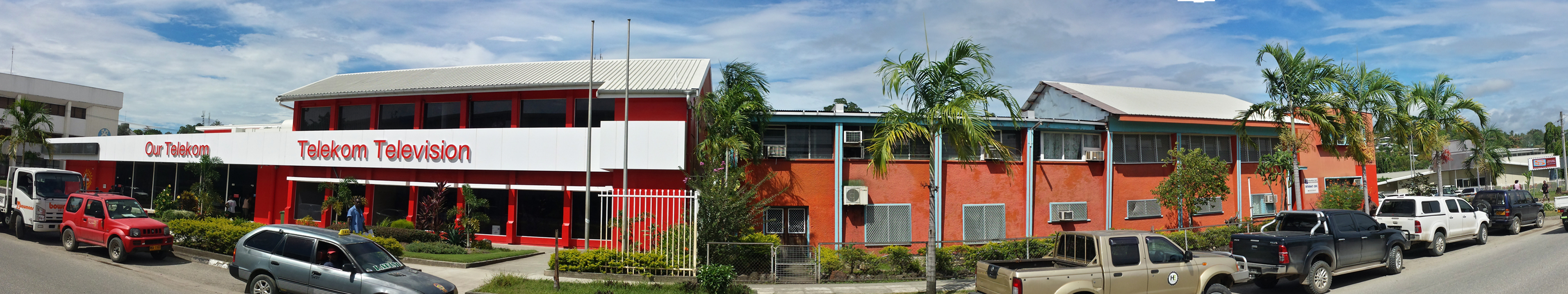
Our Telekom HQ

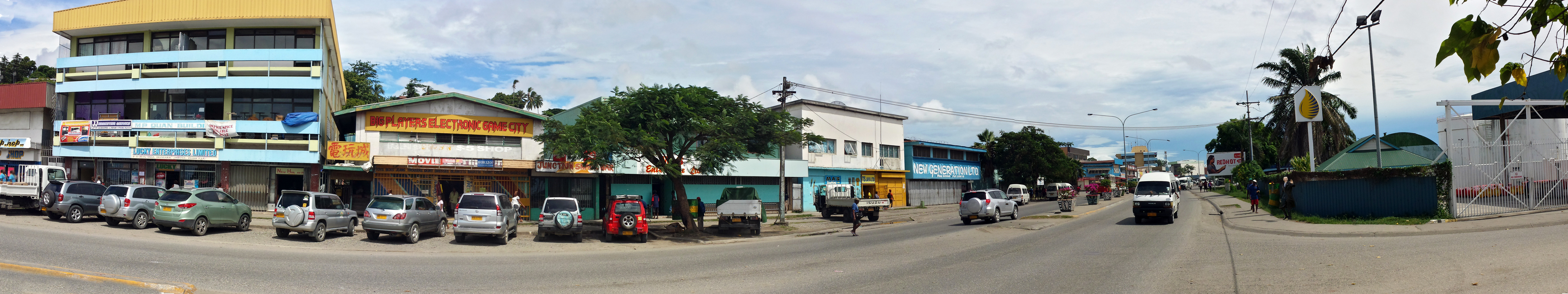
Pacific Oil depot
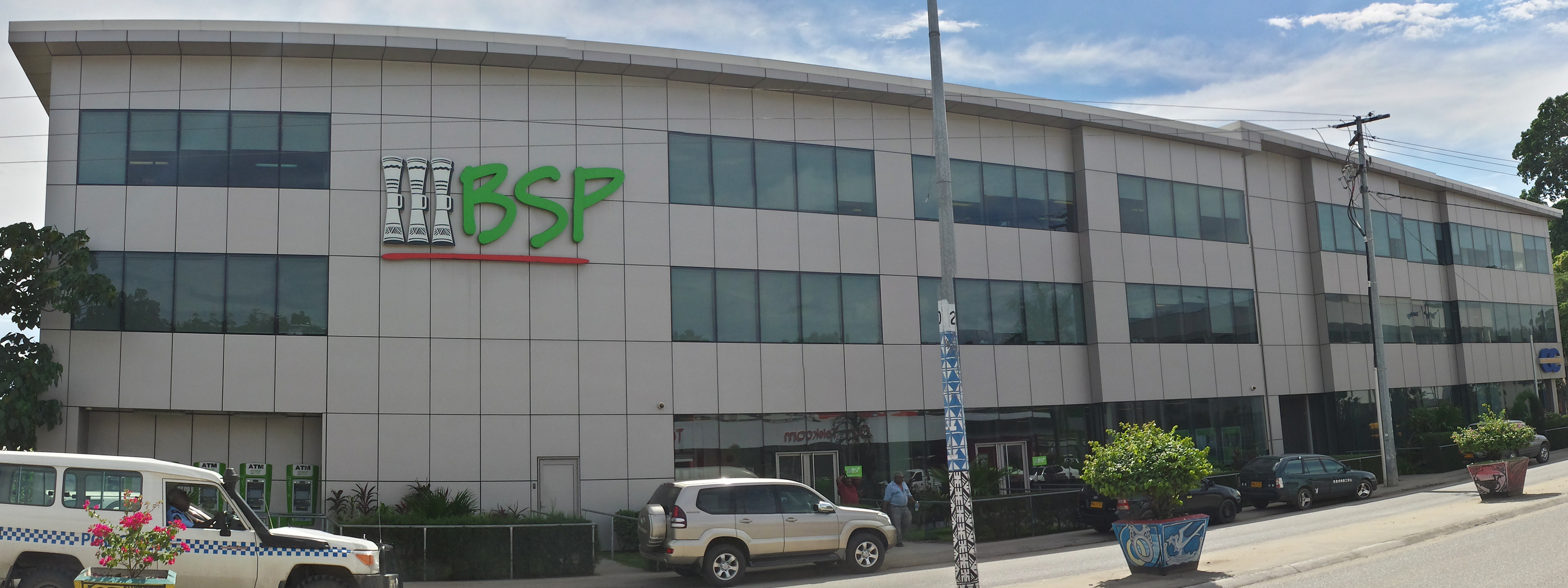
Bank of South Pacific HQ, Mendana Ave.

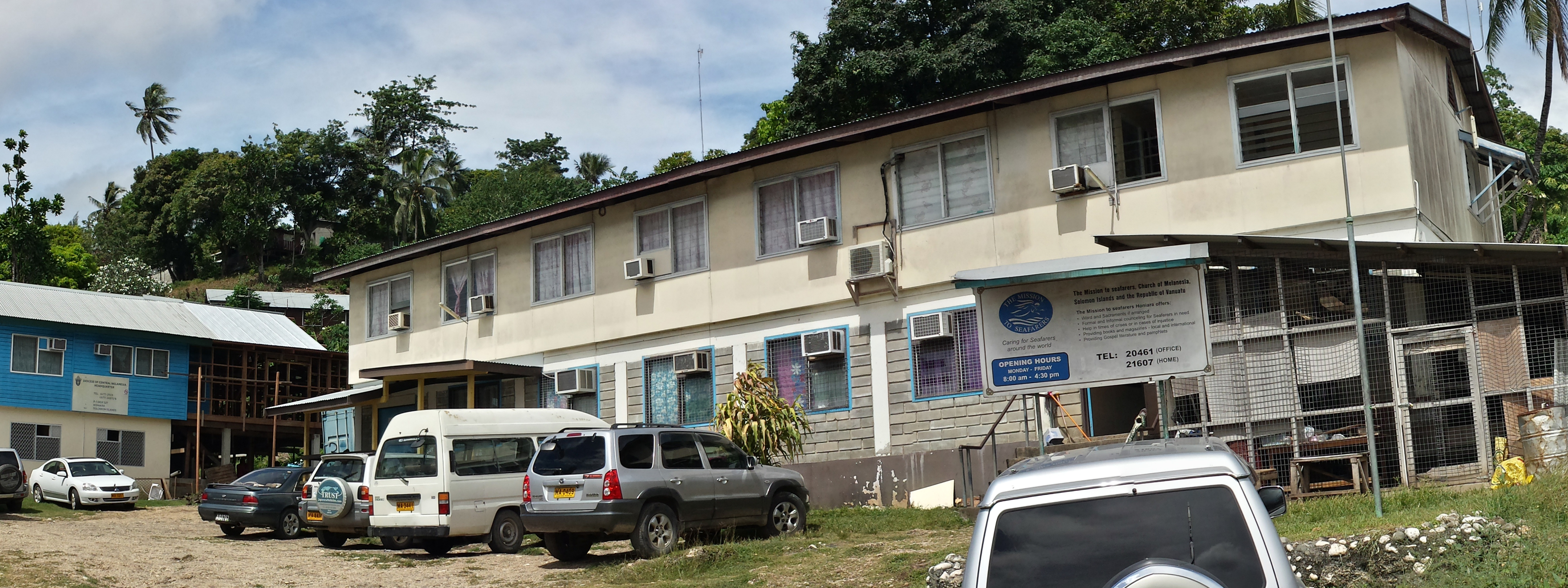
Mission to Seafarers, Church of Melanesia.

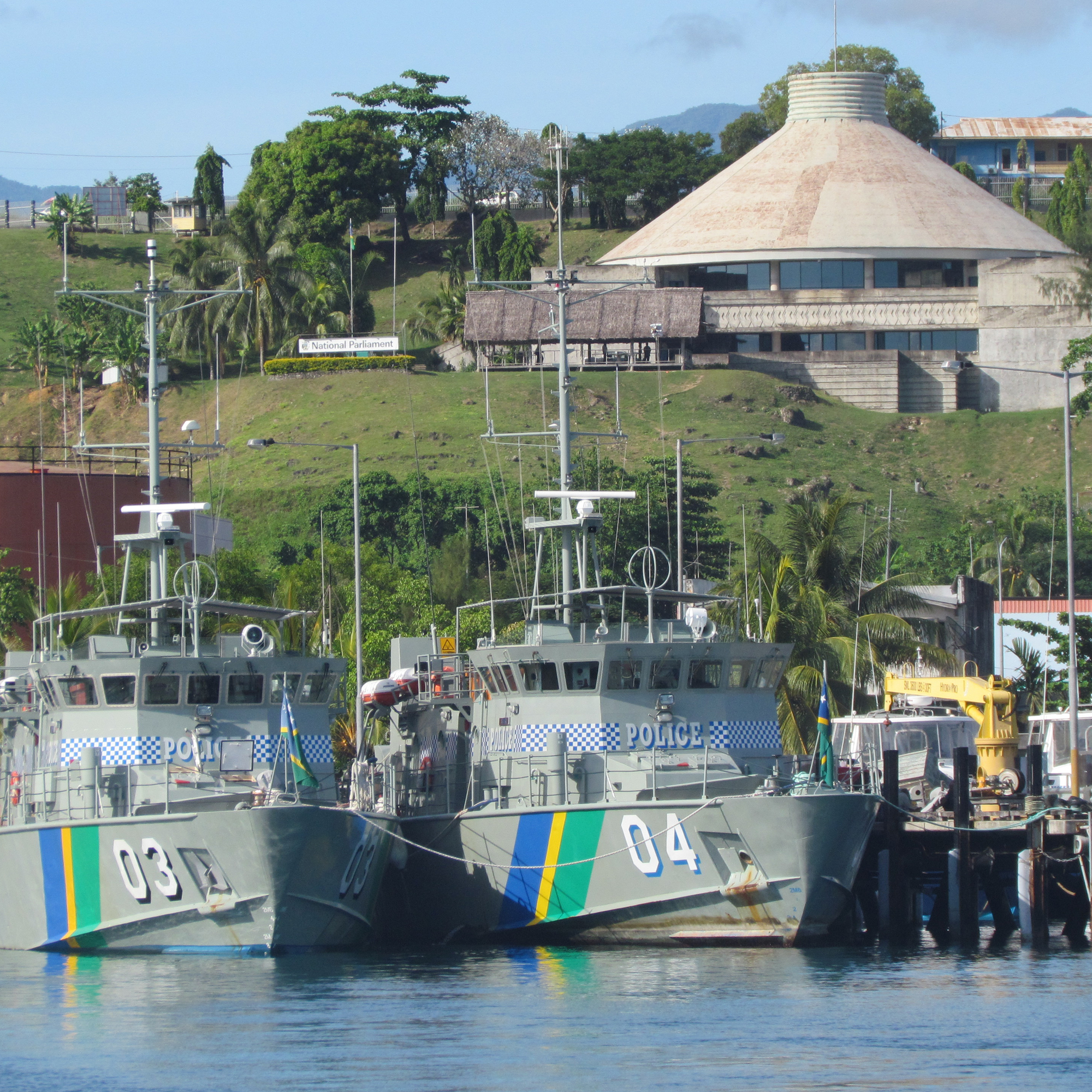
Police boats and parliament.

== National Parliament ==
The National Parliament of Solomon island was founded on the birth of national independence in July 1978.

The building is a circular design and was funded by the United States for the 50th anniversary of the Guadalcanal Campaign and constructed by a Japanese firm.

This structure was the recipient of the NAVFAC 1997 Commander's Award for Design Excellence.

== Tourism ==
=== Point Cruz Yacht Club ===
The Point Cruz Yacht Club is located in the Point Cruz suburb and overlooks the Savo and Florida Islands.

The new clubhouse of the Point Cruz Yacht Club in Honiara was opened by its Commodore, High Commissioner Sir Robert Foster, on 15 August 1964.

As at 2012 there are 7 visiting cruising yachts here all swinging free on the West side of the harbor near the yellow mooring buoy.

A plaque commemorating Signalman First Class Douglas Albert Munro who was the only member of the United States Coast Guard to have received the Medal of Honor, for his actions during the September Matanikau action in the Guadalcanal campaign of World War II is displayed inside the Yacht Club.

=== Heritage Park Hotel ===
The 5 star Heritage Park Hotel was built on the site of the Old Government House which was later used as the original Art Gallery.

=== Solomon Kitano Mendana Hotel ===
The Solomon Kitano Mendana Hotel has 96 rooms and underwent extensive renovations in 2008. The Solomon Kitano Mendana Hotel falls under the Japanese Kitano Construction Corp. and was named after Spanish explorer Álvaro de Mendaña de Neira.

=== King Solomon Hotel ===
The King Solomon Hotel has 73 rooms

In 1964 a resthouse was built by Baháʼí pioneer Alvin J. Blum on the site of the present-day King Solomon Hotel on Hibiscus Avenue, and became Honiara's third hotel. In 2005 the Blums were featured on Solomon Island stamps.

=== SINPF Hibiscus Apartments ===
Photos of Tourist landmarks
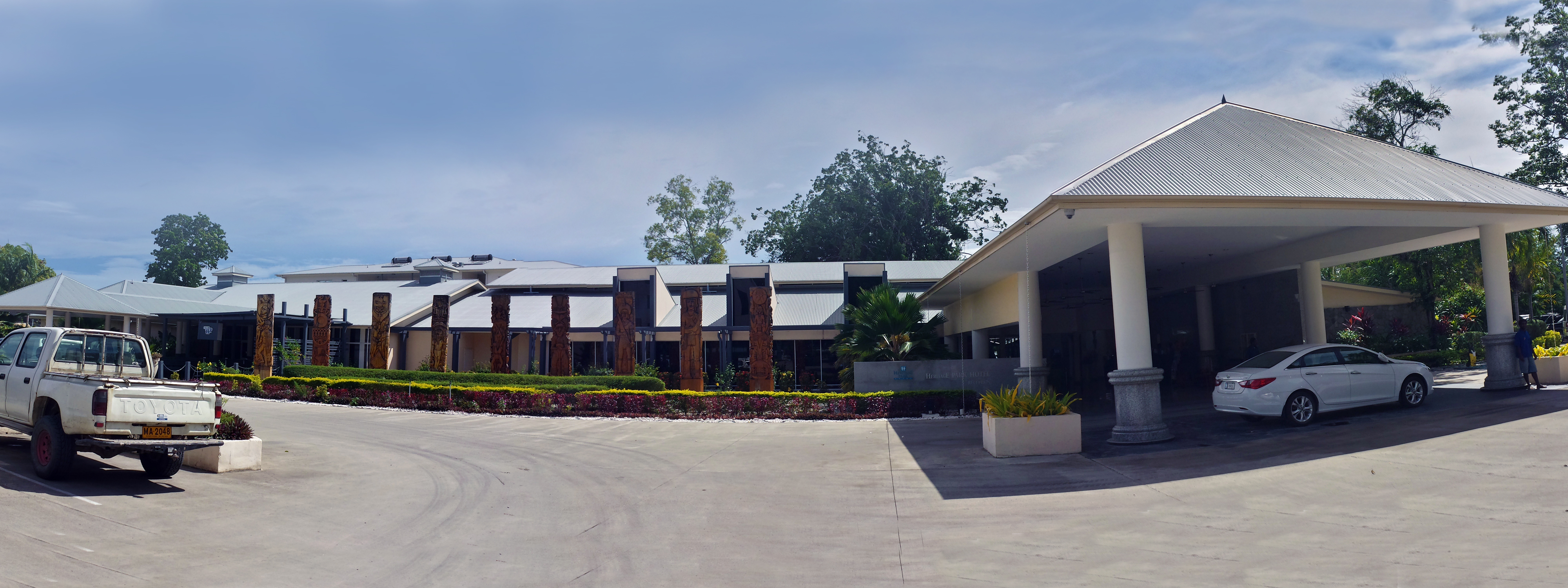
Heritage Park Hotel

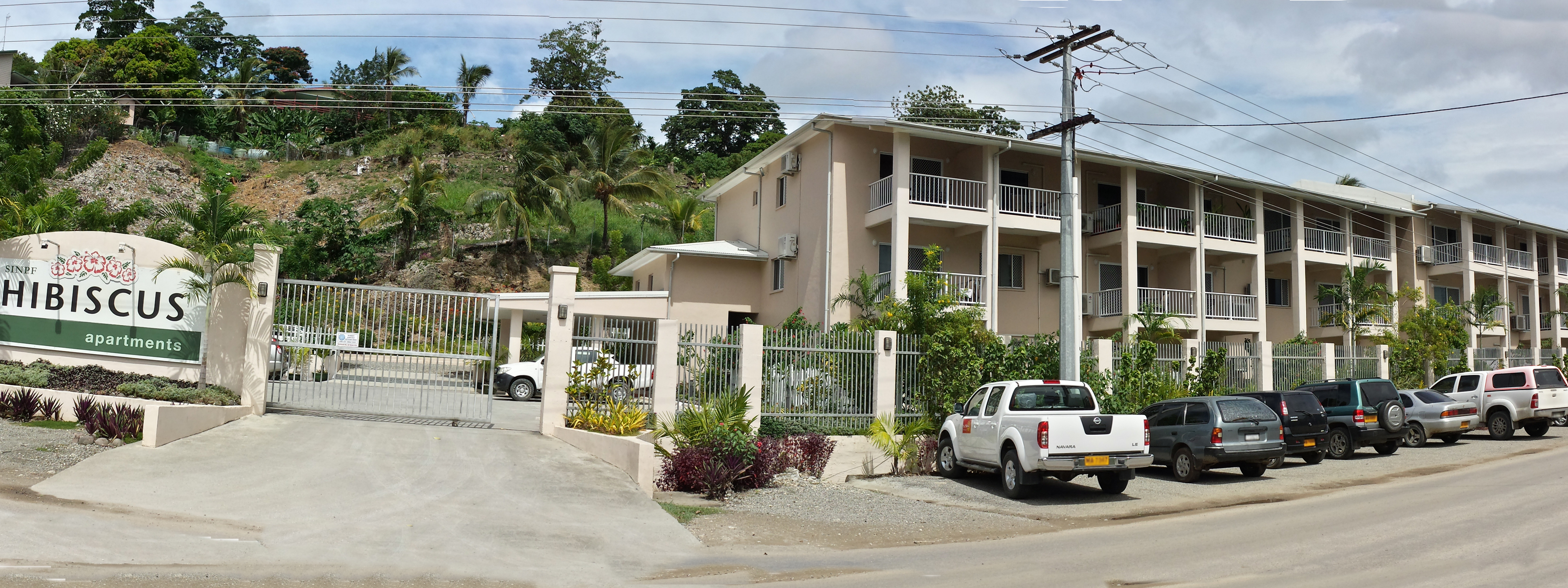
SINPF Hibiscus Apartments

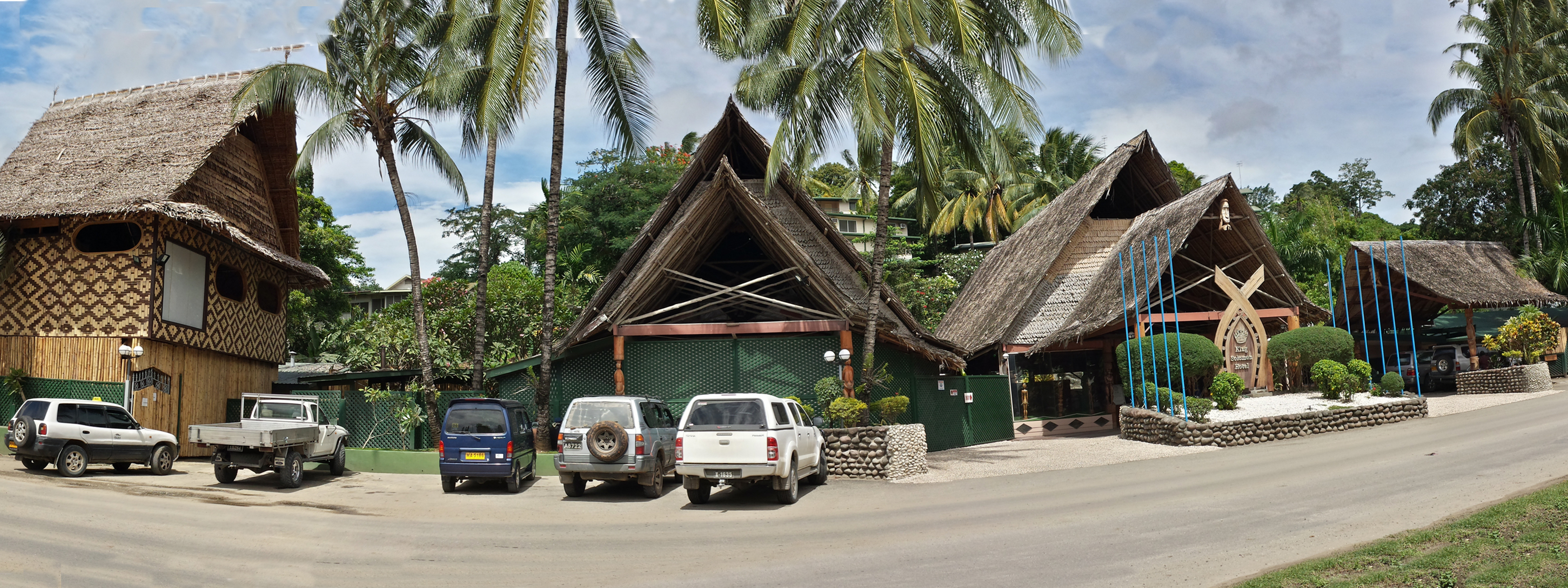
King Solomon Hotel
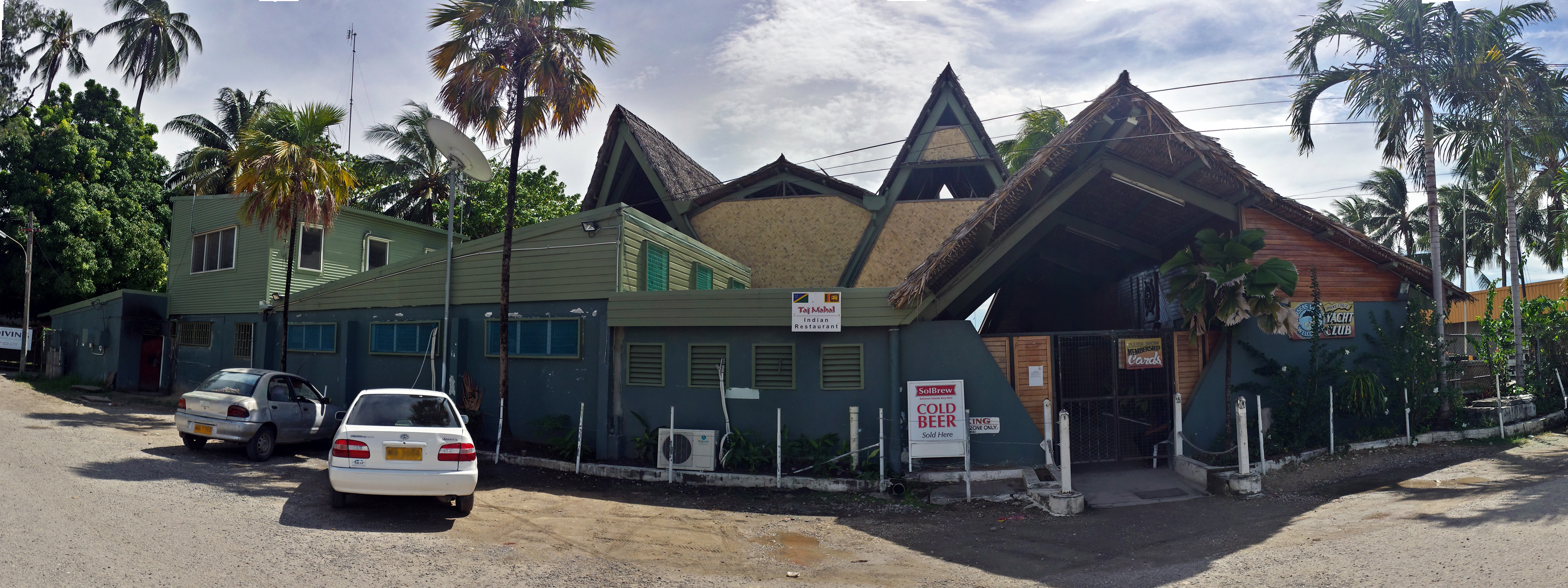
Honiara Yacht Club

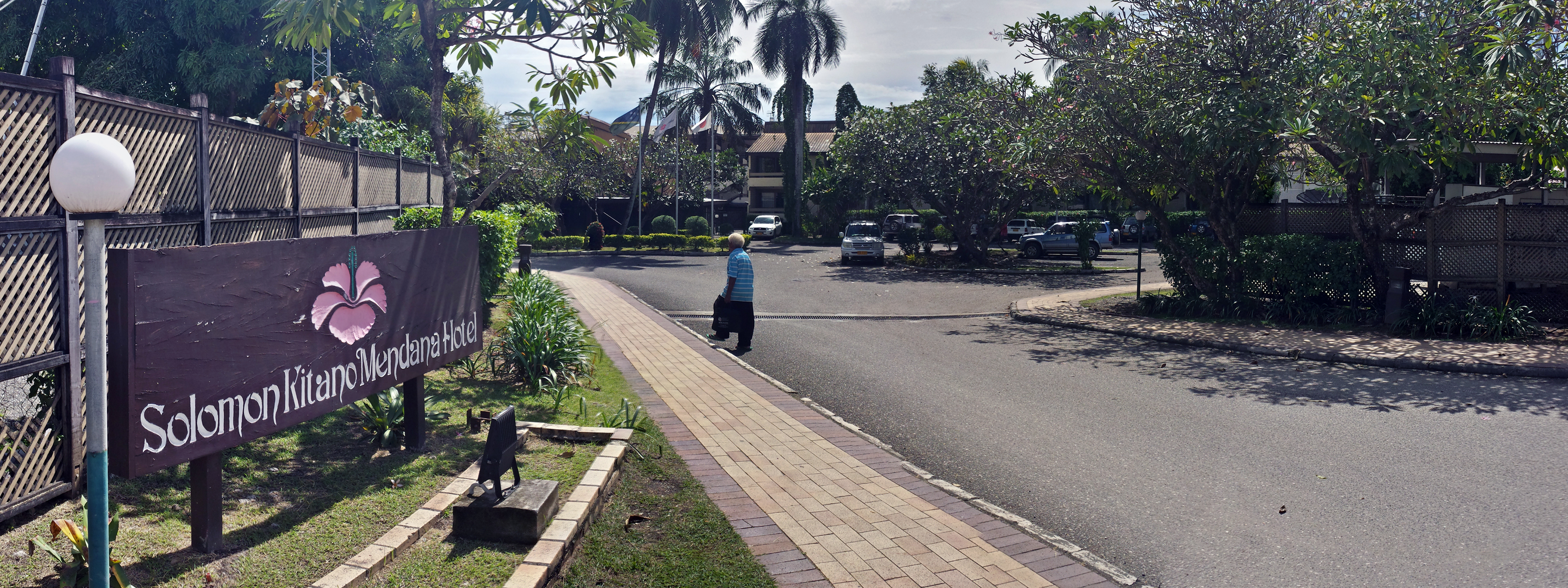
Solomon Kitano Mendana Hotel

== Art Gallery ==
The new Art Gallery and the Open Air Theater project was built in 2012 at a cost of more than $61million. The Art Gallery has many displays and celebrations are held at the Art Gallery grounds.

The Solomon Islands Artists Association (SIAA) conducts displays and workshops at the art gallery and was founded in 1991 and now has over 200 artists members.

The Art Gallery hosts the Youth Market which is the location where the local band Red Star Unit often performs.

=== Mere's Market ===
Mere's Market is held at the Honiara Art Gallery every 2 months and enables Solomon Islands Women in Business Association (SIWINA) to showcase their businesses, create networks, share ideas and add to their incomes which has been funded by Australia since 2011.

=== Film Festival ===
The G'day Solomon Islands film festival commenced Friday 6 June which is a collaboration with the Australian High Commission in Honiara is located in the Art Gallery grounds.

=== National Museum ===
The existing National Museum organises Solomon Islands dance performances and was officially opened 12 November 1999 and was originally established in 1969.

The Japanese Government donated grants for the construction of several buildings used by the museum.

In 1991 during construction of the National Museum, construction workers unearthed thirty 75mm un-exploded Japanese rounds and several US munitions that were buried since the Guadalcanal Campaign.

In 2015 the National Museum hosted an unexploded ordnance photographic display of artifacts still present since the end of WW2.

Photos of Cultural landmarks
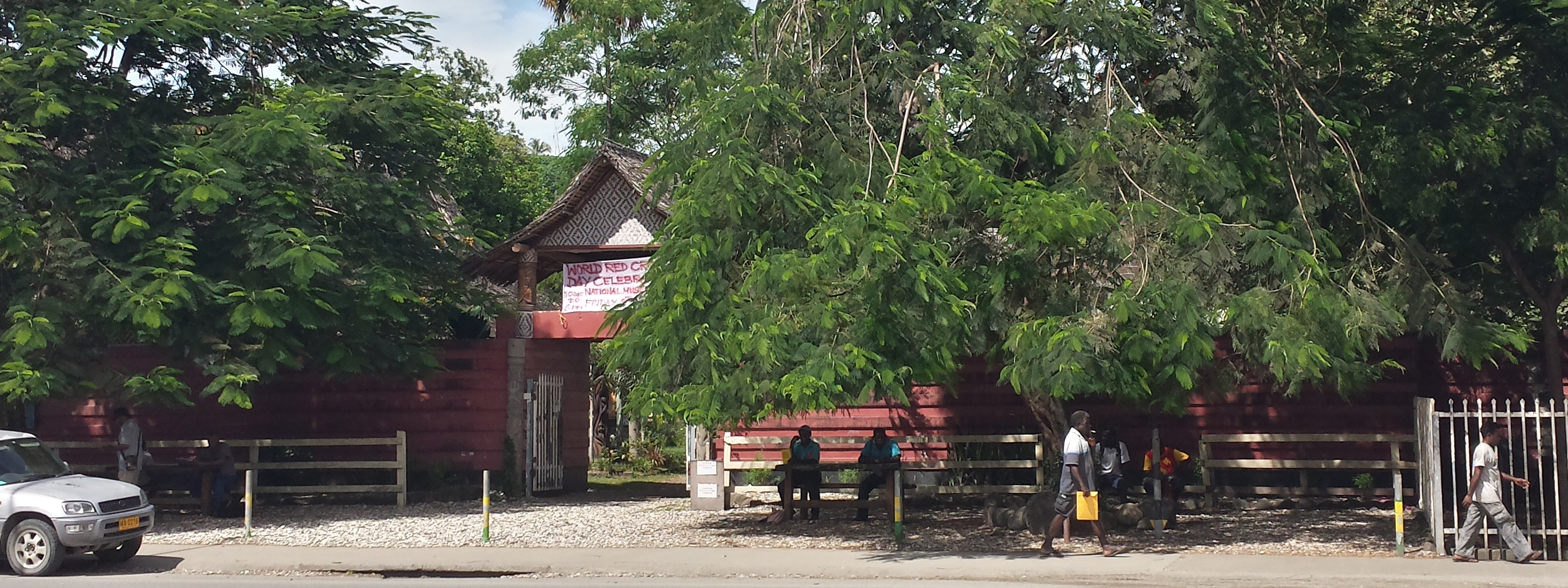
Honiara Museum, Mendana Ave.

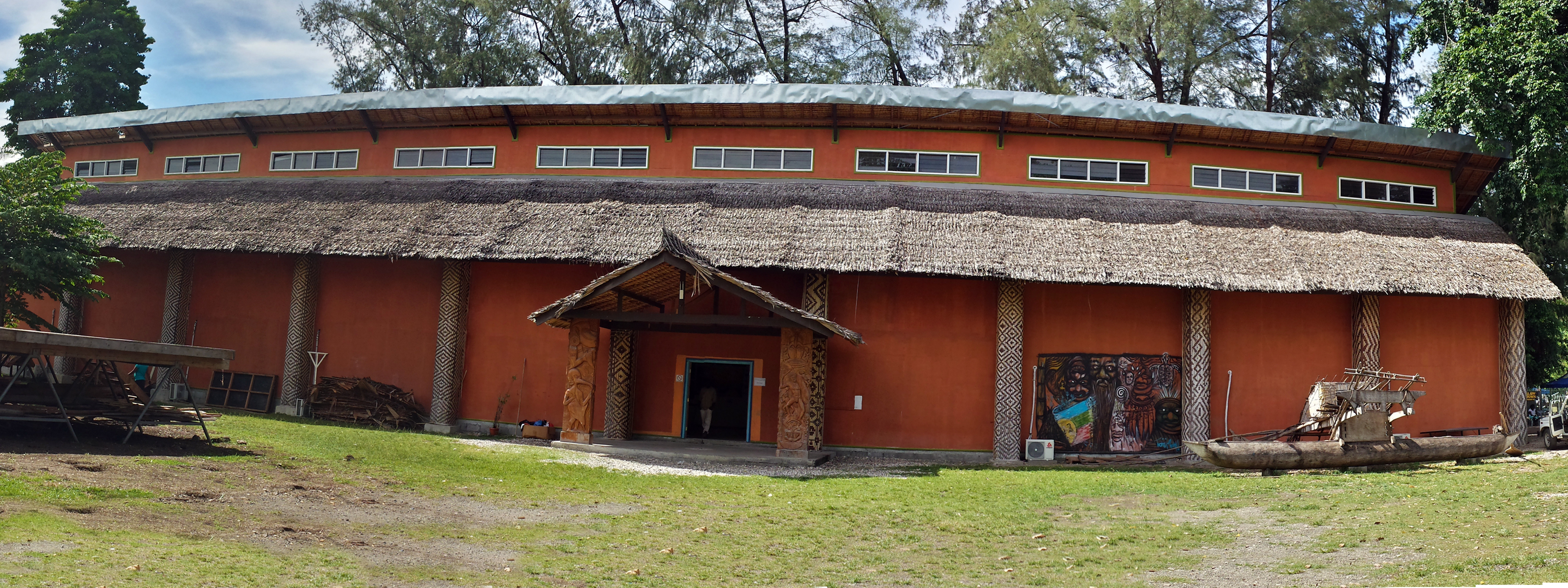
Honiara Art Gallery

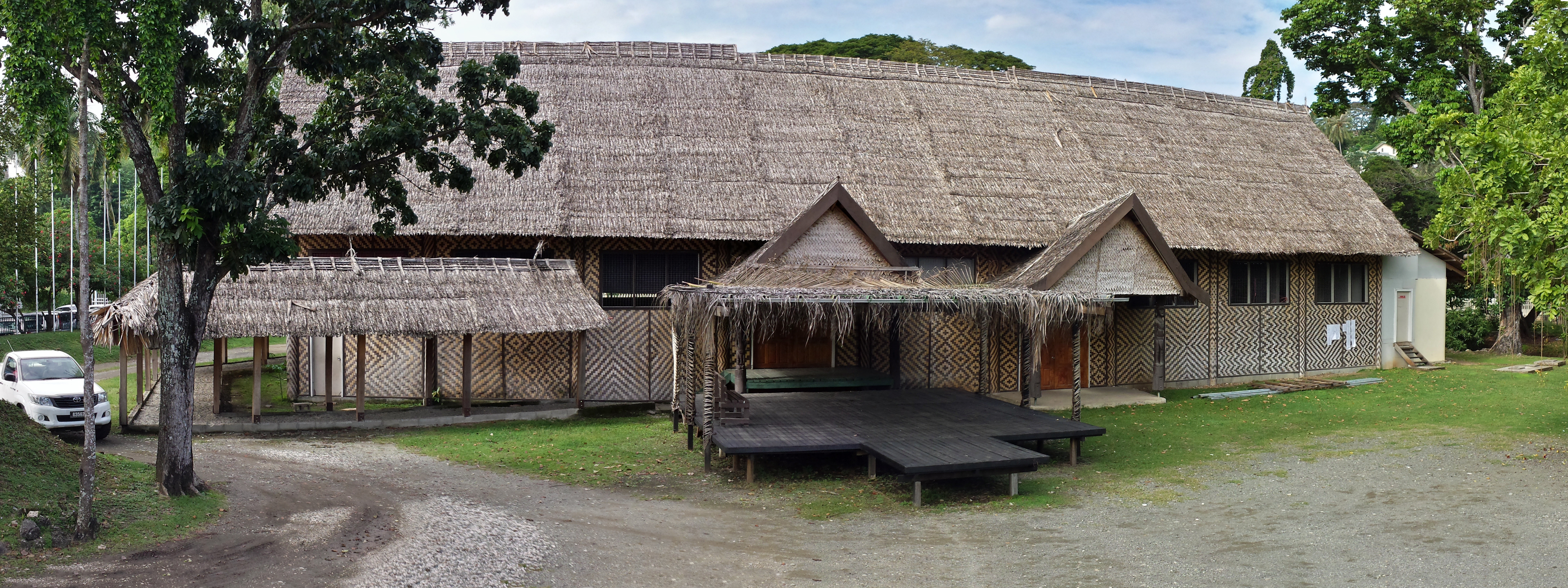
Honiara open air theater, Museum Grounds
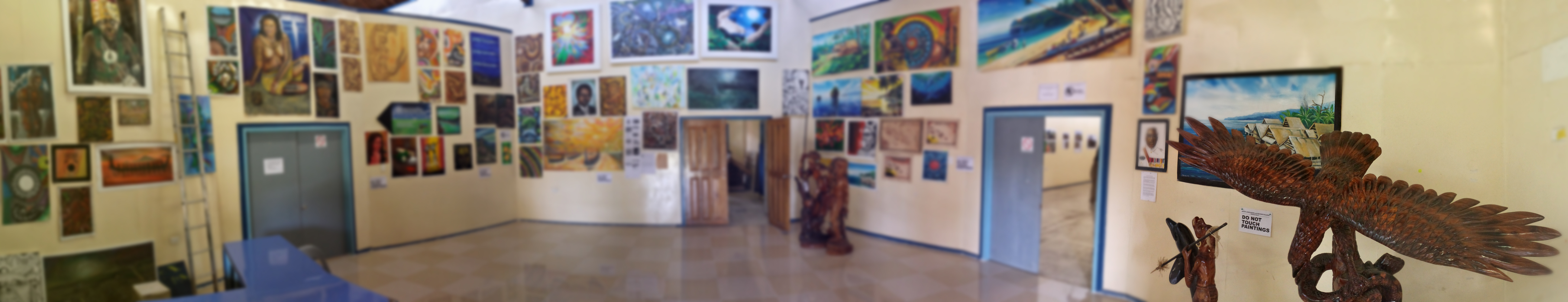
Panorama of Honiara Art Gallery

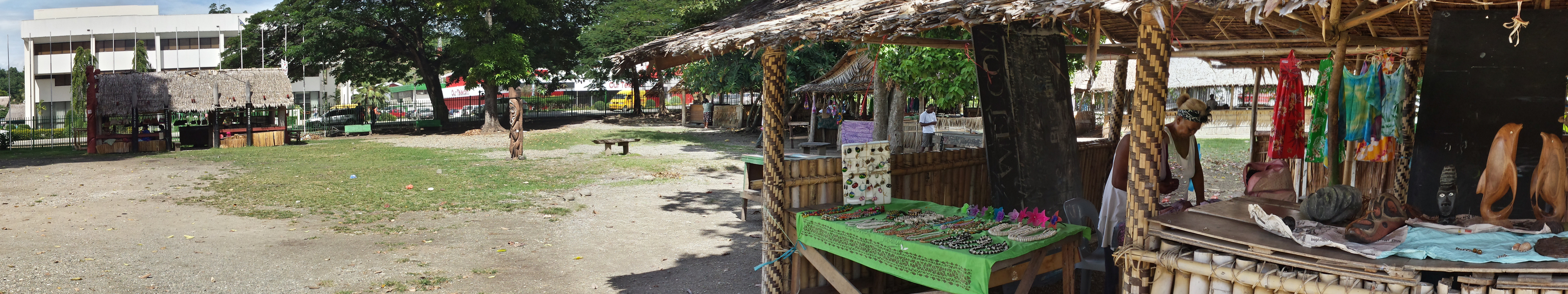
Meres Market at the art gallery grounds

== Industry ==
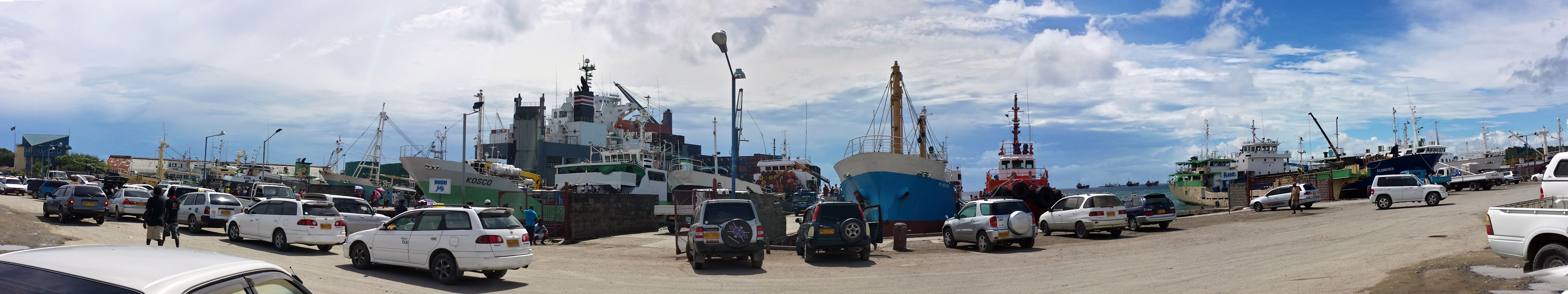
Panoramic photo of Honiara wharf.

=== Honiara Port ===
The Solomon Islands Ports Authority (SIPA) was established on 4 June 1956 as a statutory corporation by an Act of Parliament. It is a State Own Enterprise(SOE) and is wholly owned by the government of Solomon Islands.

Currently the maximum vessel size for vessels is over 500 feet (150 m) in length and the maximum depth is 9.14 metres (30.0 ft)

A new International Wharf consisting of a new 180 metres (590 ft) deep sea water berth is under construction and is expected that the new wharf will be in operation in 2016 at a cost of 24 million US dollars.

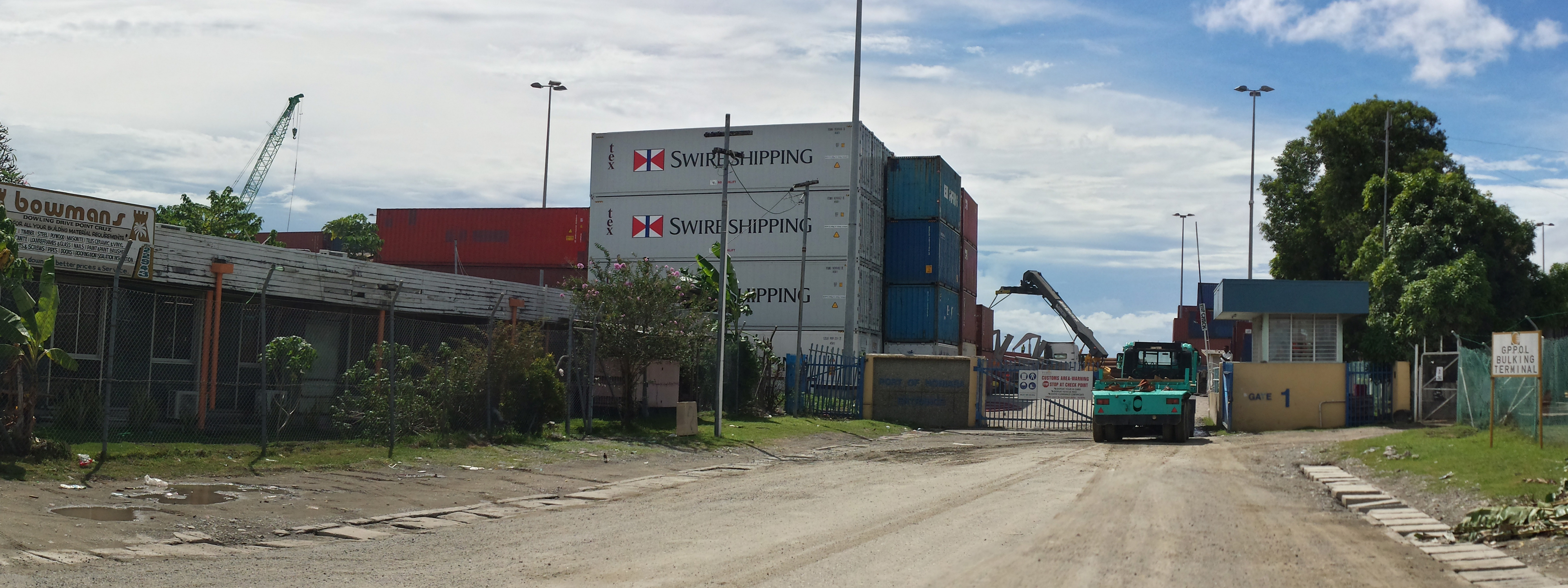
Customs area, Honiara Port

In 2014 the Honiara Port was awarded with the Club of Ports' Label for Excellence as the most dynamic port in the Pacific area.

=== South Pacific Oil depot ===
The main South Pacific Oil terminal is located at the Honiara Port. South Pacific Oil Limited purchased Shell Pacific's business and assets in Solomon Islands in 2006 and is 100% owned by the Solomon Islands National Provident Fund. Over 85 million litres (22,000,000 US gal) of petroleum is imported annually

Photos of Memorials
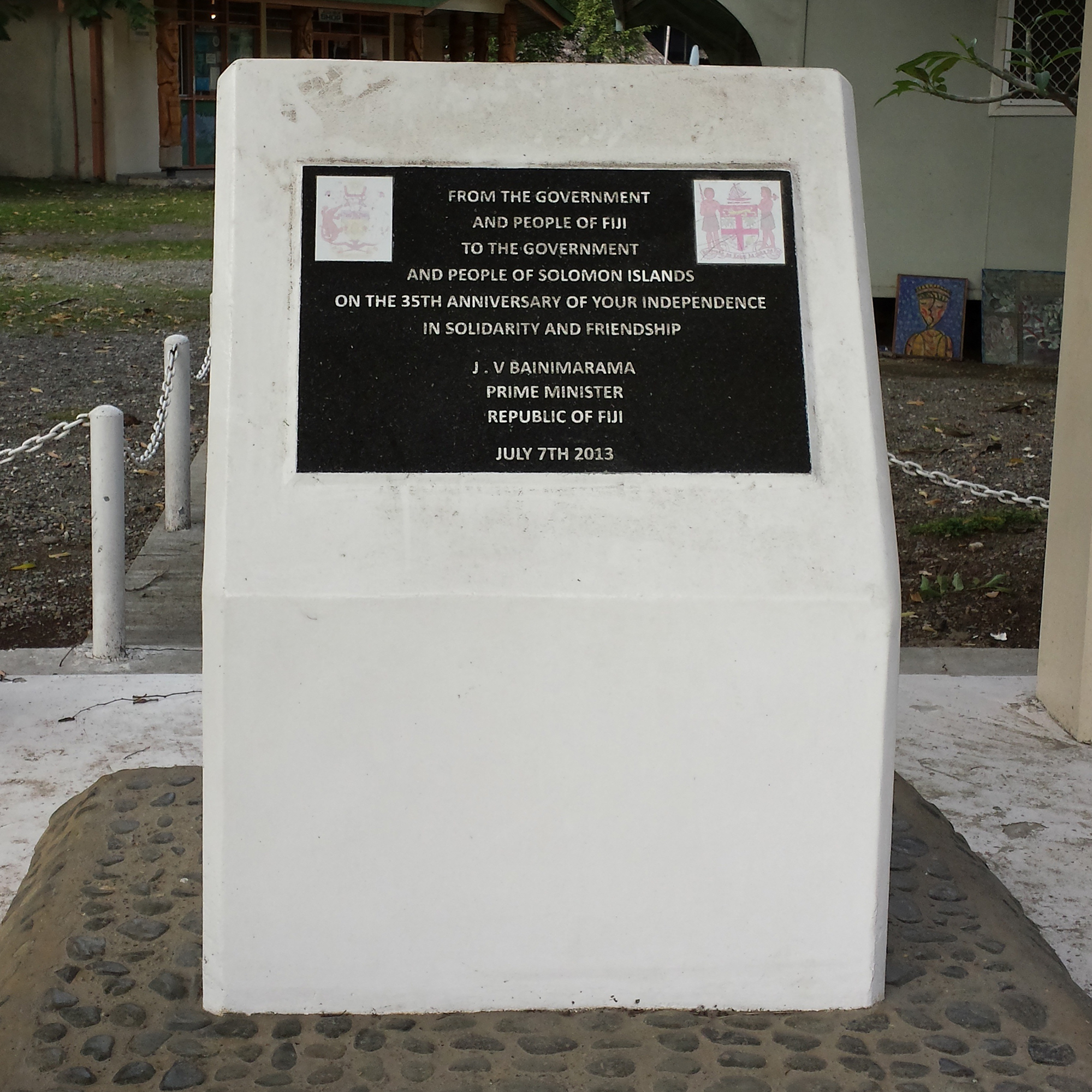
35th Independence anniversary gift from Fiji

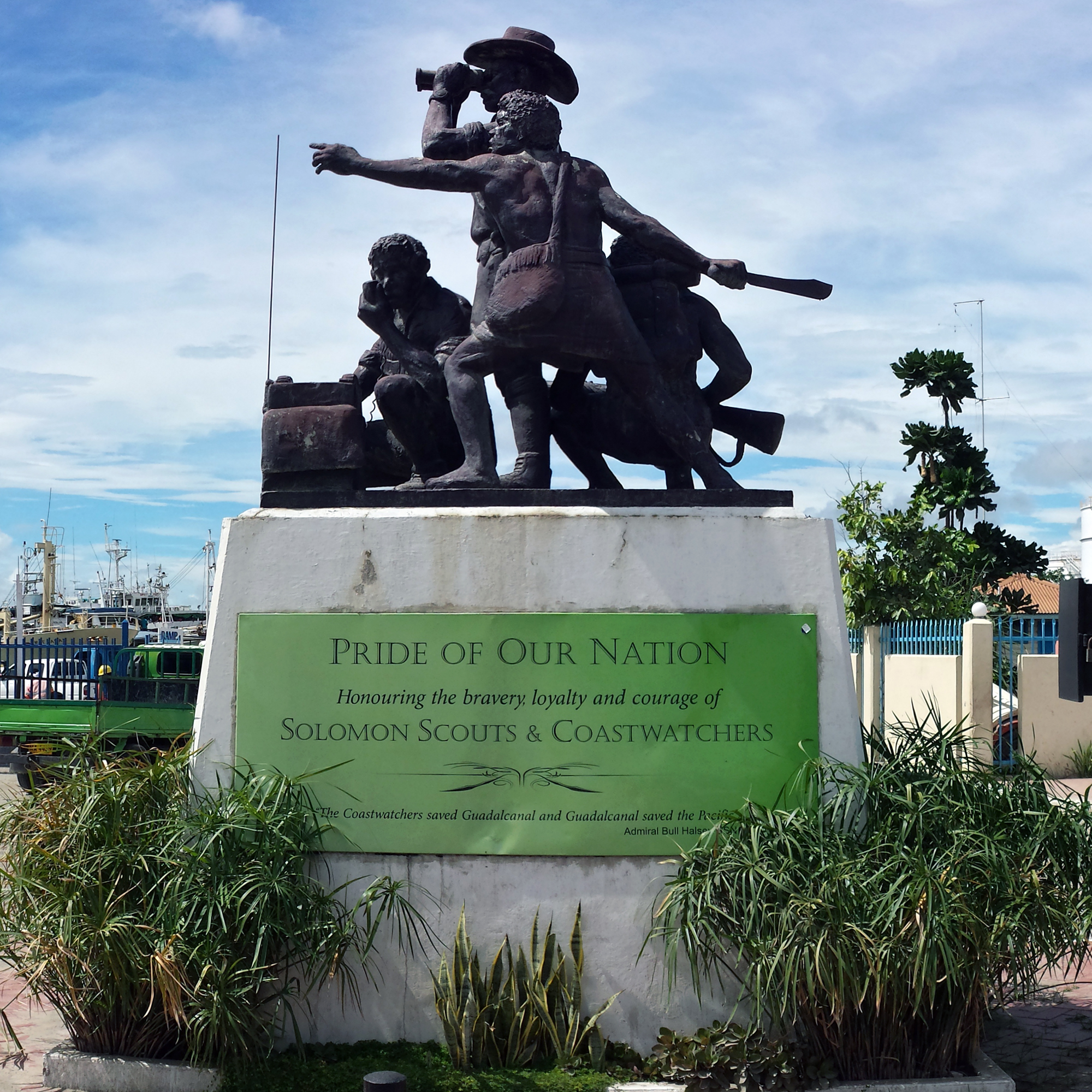
Coastwatchers memorial Commonwealth Street

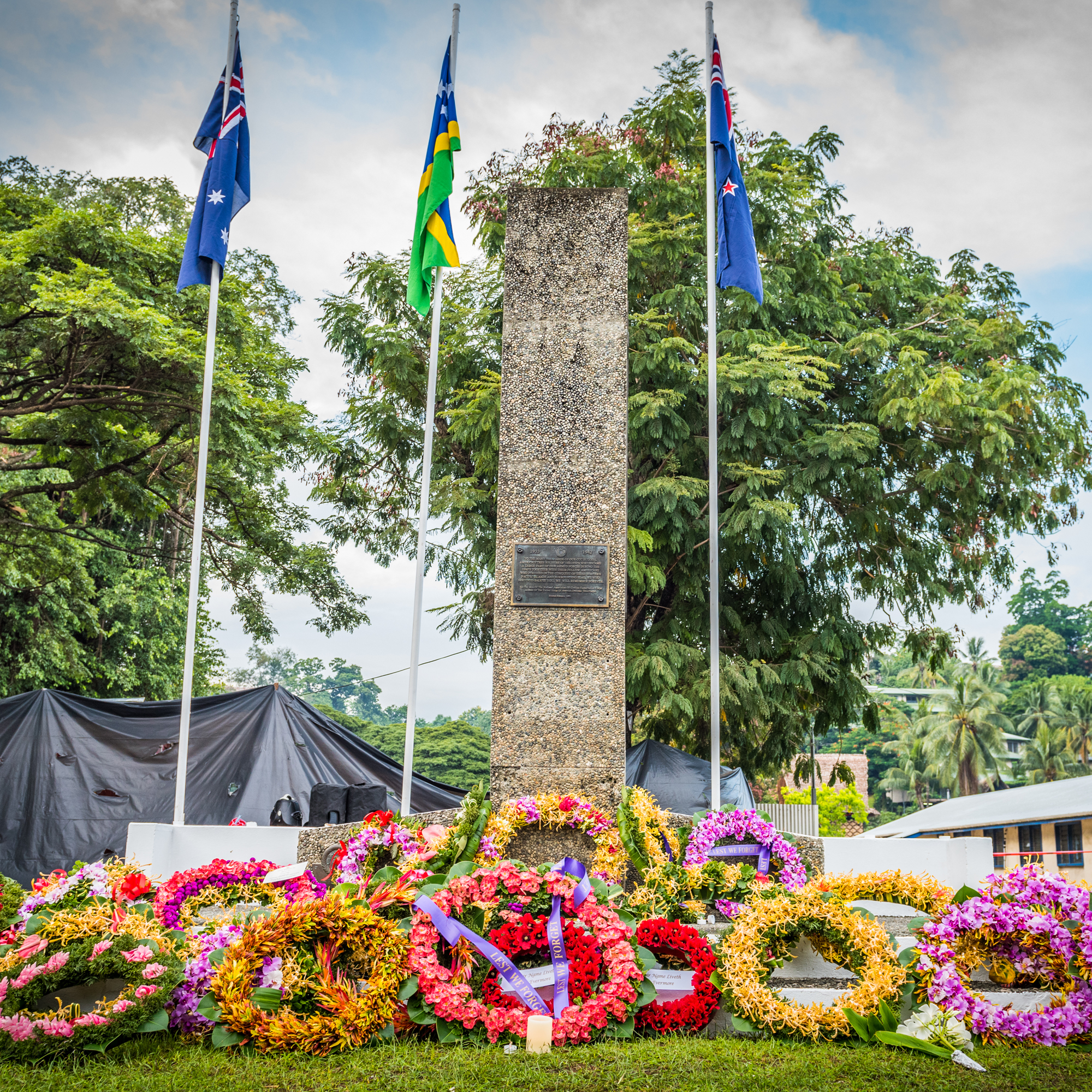
Cenotaph, Central Police Station

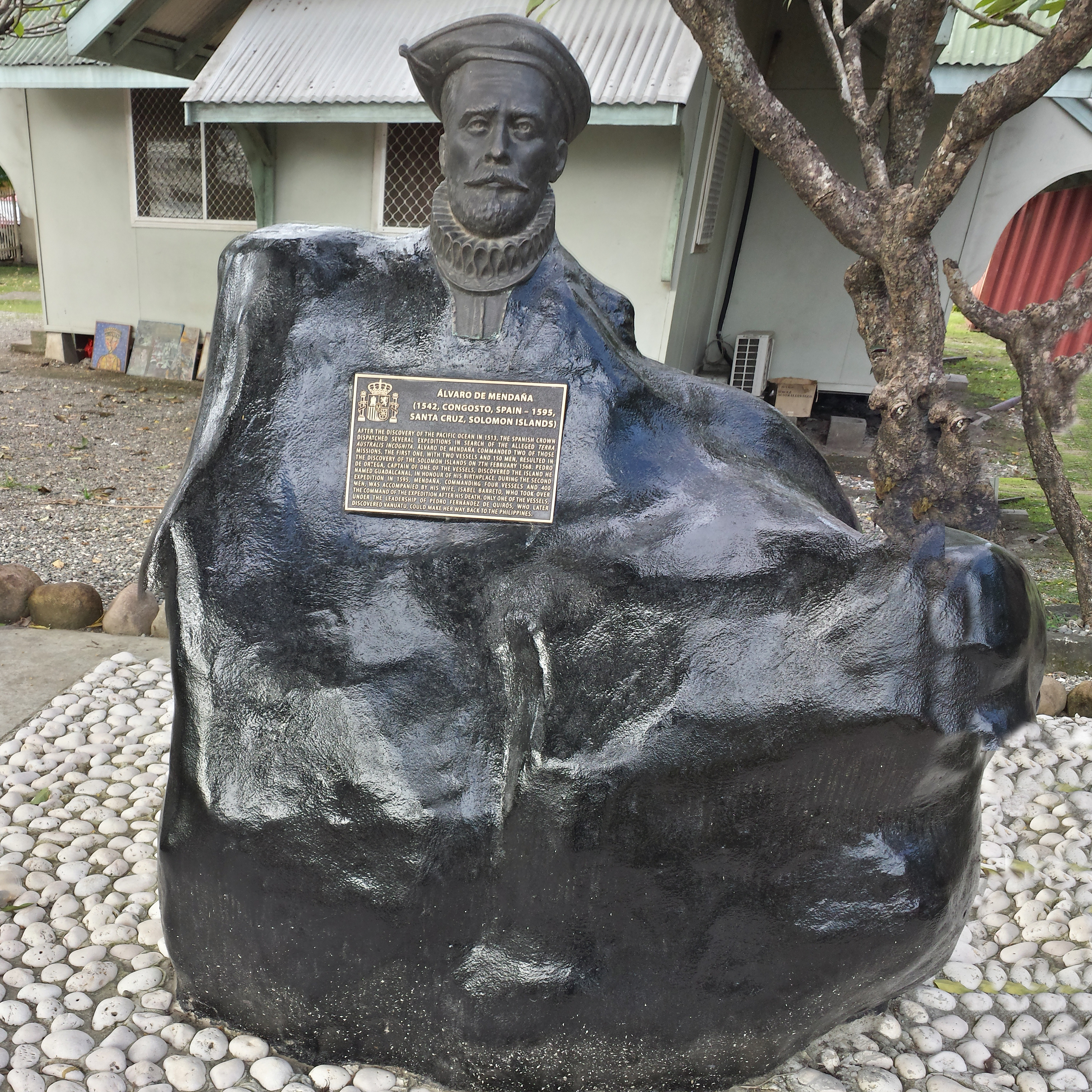
Bust of Spanish explorer Álvaro de Mendaña de Neira
Coastwatchers memorial plaques
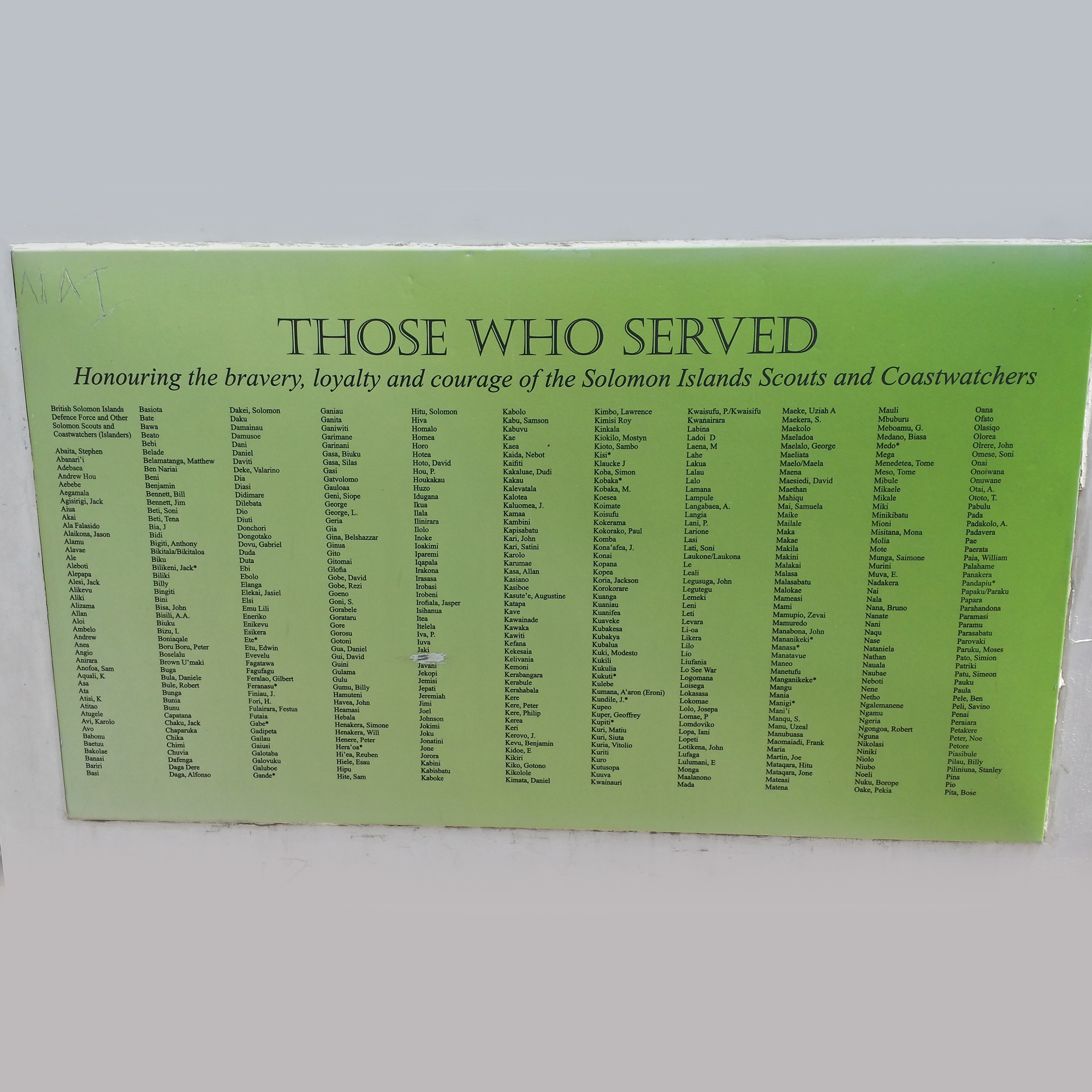
Plaque of names.

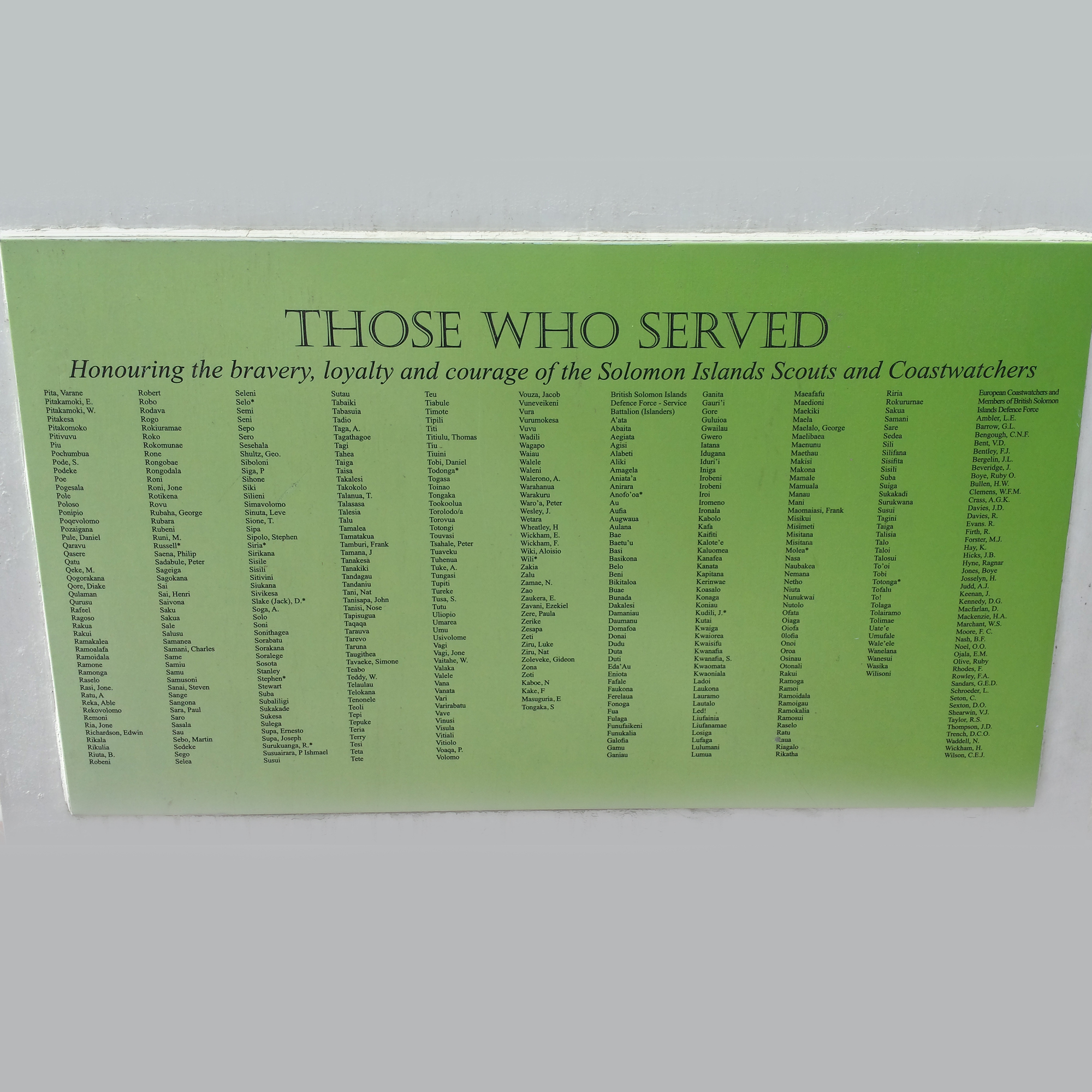
Plaque of names

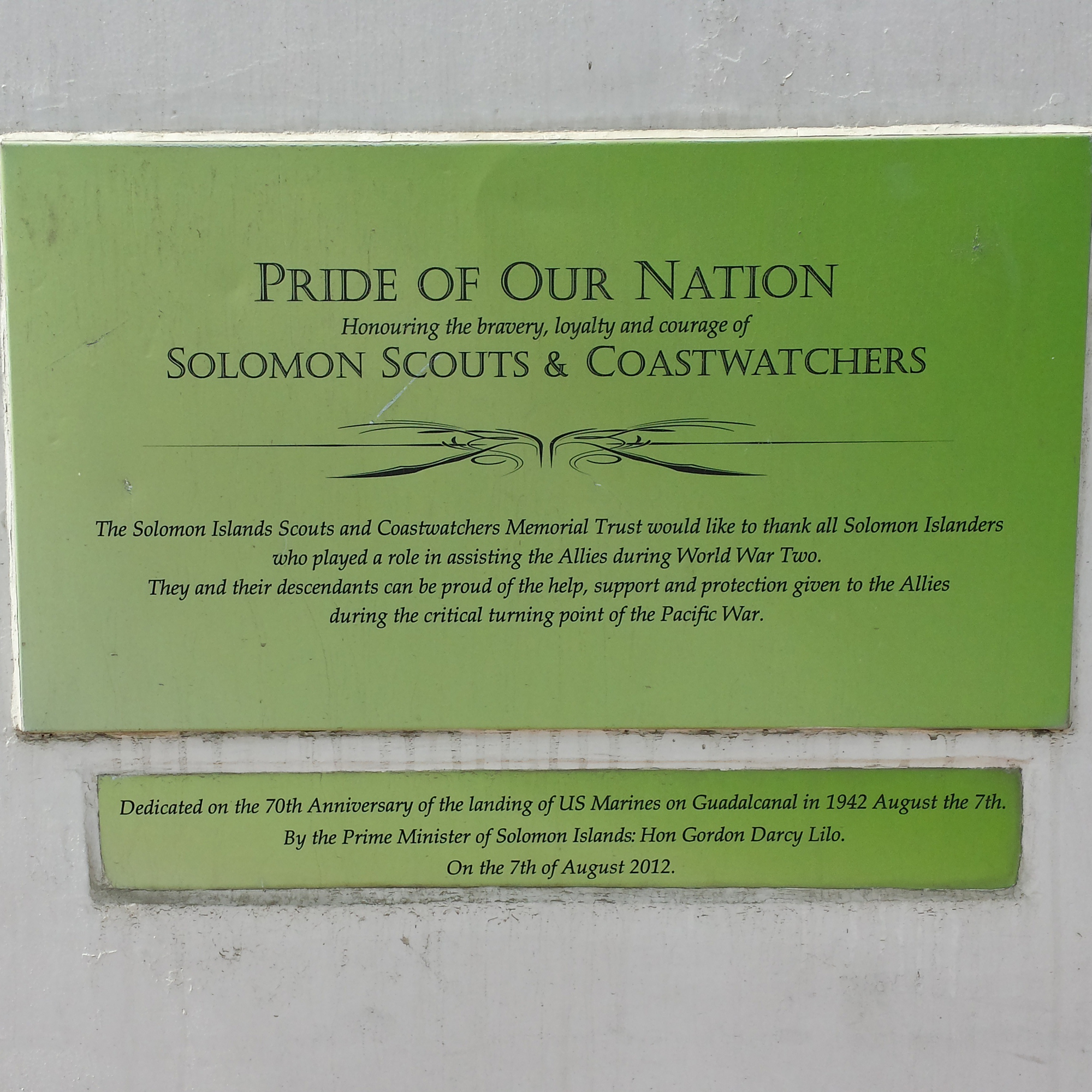
Plaque of thanks

== See also ==
- USS Point Cruz (CVE-119)
- Point Cruz Peninsular in WW2
- Point Cruz Peninsular in WW2
- Guadalcanal: America’s First Offensive
- Point Cruz Wharf Facebook Page
- Point Cruz Yacht Club Facebook page
- Point Cruz Tulagi Dive Facebook Page
- Point Cruz band - No Tea Ft Divandeh
- Australia in Solomons Facebook page
- Kitano Mendana Hotel Facebook page
- Central Police Station Facebook page
- National Museum 2014 display
- SIWIB Facebook page
- NPF Plaza Facebook page
- Anthony Saru Building Facebook page
