= Cuisine of Solomon Islands =

Culinary traditions of Solomon Islands

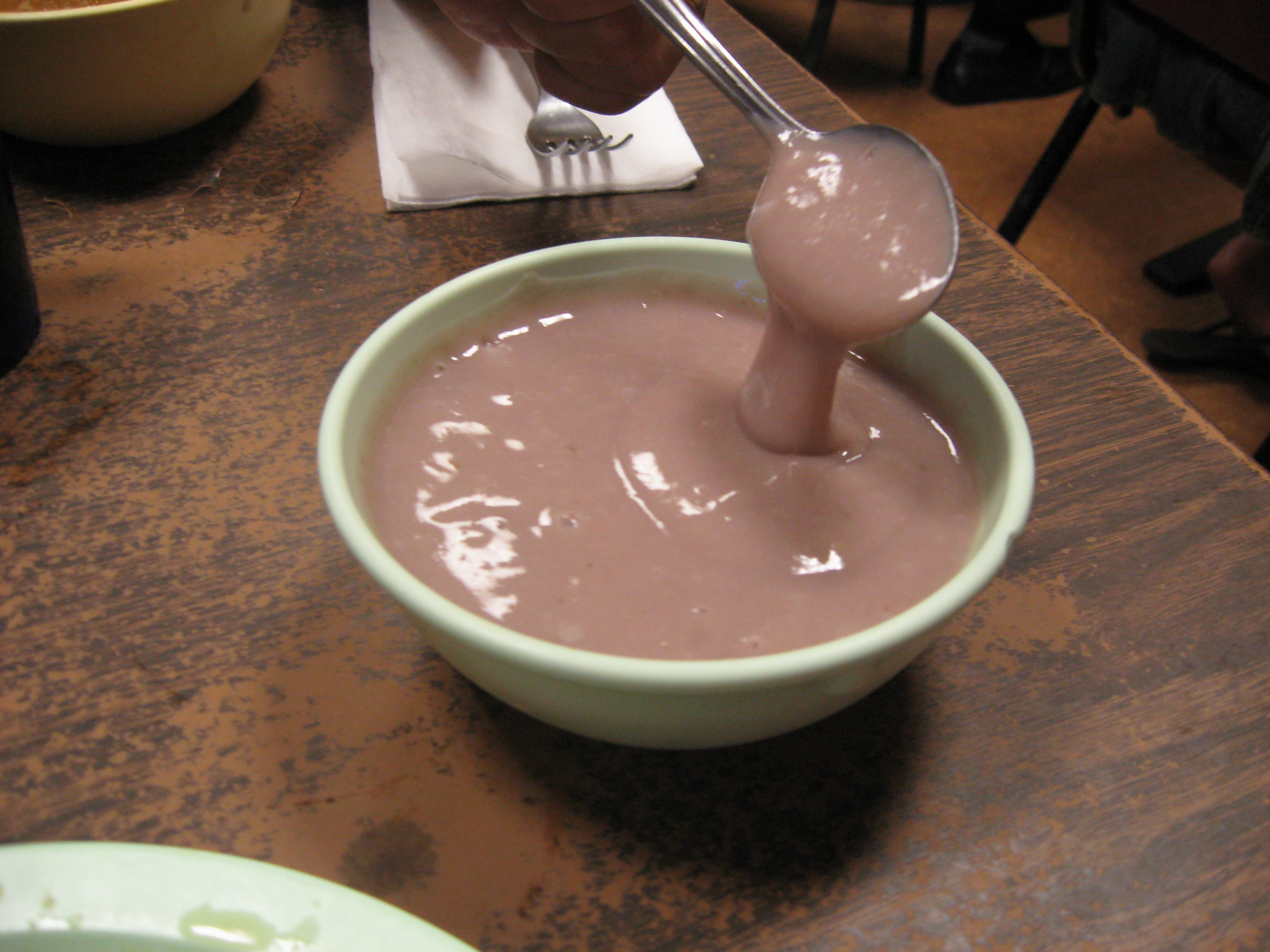
- A bowl of poi.
- Country or region: Solomon Islands
- National dish: Poi
- National drink: Kava

Cuisine of the Solomon Islands has developed over 5,000 years of inhabitation and external influences. From the Spanish, the islands received cattle; from the Asians and Indians, spices, exotic vegetables and fruit.

The islands were later colonized by the English, who left their own culinary mark. The main occupations of the locals are fishing and agriculture, so fish, coconuts, cassava, sweet potatoes and a variety of fruits and vegetables figure into the local cuisine.

== Fundamentals ==
Cooking techniques include baking, boiling and frying. Special dishes are made using all kinds of ingredients. Fish is the staple meat in the Solomon Islands cuisine. Usually any meat is cooked and served with sweet potatoes, rice, taro roots, cassava, taro leaves and many other vegetables. Beside the local traditional cuisine many dishes from both European and Asian culture can be easily found and served in any restaurant or household of this country.

== Notable dishes ==
Distinctive dishes of the Solomons include:

- Ulu (breadfruit), can be served with any dish, brought to the island by Lapita seafarers
- Bananas and other exotic fruits, sometimes wrapped in pearl cassava and served with whipped cream or caramel
- Poi, made with fermented taro roots; served during any Solomonian celebration. This dish can be served with chicken or fish, or made like a porridge. Also served frequently during holidays is tapioca or pearl cassava, generally served like a pudding.

== See also ==
- Culture of the Solomon Islands
