= Tongan literature =

Among the first published works of Tongan literature, in the late 1960s and early 1970s, were 'Epeli Hau'ofa's short stories and Konai Helu Thaman's poetry. Hau'ofa's popular collection of short stories Tales of the Tikongs (1973) was followed by a novel, Kisses in the Nederends, 1987, noted for its satirical style. The emergence of Tongan written literature (as distinct from oral literature) took place in the context of the development of indigenous Pacific Islander literature in the Pacific region as a whole, beginning in the late 1960s.

== Sources ==
- "English in the South Pacific", John Lynch and France Mugler, University of the South Pacific
