= Tuvalu mo te Atua =

National anthem of Tuvalu

English: Tuvalu for the Almighty
- National anthem of Tuvalu
- Lyrics: Afaese Manoa
- Music: Afaese Manoa
- Adopted: 1978

Audio sample
- Digital Recreation: file; help

"Tuvalu for the Almighty" (Tuvaluan: "Tuvalu mo te Atua") is the national anthem of Tuvalu. The lyrics and music are by Afaese Manoa. It was adopted in 1978, when the country became independent from the United Kingdom. It is also used as a motto of the country and additionally serves as the title of the Coat of arms of Tuvalu.

Tuvalu•Mo•Te•Atua on Tuvalu coat of arms

== Lyrics ==
Tuvaluan lyrics

I
Tuvalu mo te Atua,
Ko te Fakavae sili,
Ko te ala foki tena,
O te manuia katoa

Loto lasi o fai,
Tou malo saoloto
Fusi ake katoa
Ki te loto alofa

Kae amo fakatasi
Ate atu fenua.
“Tuvalu mo te Atua”
Ki te se gata mai!

II
Tuku atu tau pulega
Ki te pule mai luga,
Kilo tonu ki ou mua
Me ko ia e tautai.

“Pule tasi mo ia”
Ki te se gata mai,
Ko tena mana
Ko tou malosi tena.

Pati lima kae kalaga
Ulufonu ki te tupu.
“Tuvalu ko tu saoloto”
Ki te se gata mai!

IPA transcription as sung (Note: See Help:IPA and Tuvaluan language § Phonology.)

1
[tu.va.lu mo te a.tu.a]
[ko te fa.ka.vae̯ si.li]
[ko te a.la fo.ki te.na]
[o te ma.nu.i.a ka.to(a̯)]

[lo.to la.si o fai̯]
[tou̯ ma.lo sao̯.lo.to]
[fu.si a.ke ka.to(a̯)]
[ki te lo.to a.lo.fa]

[kae̯ a.mo fa.ka.ta.si]
[a.te a.tu fe.nu.a]
[tu.va.lu mo te a.tu.a]
[ki te se ŋa.ta ma(.)i]

2
[tu.ku a.tu tau̯ pu.le.ŋa]
[ki te pu.le mai̯ lu.ŋa]
[ki.lo to.nu ki ou̯ mu.a]
[me ko i.a e tau̯.tai̯]

[pu.le ta.si mo i(.a)]
[ki te se ŋa.ta ma(.)i]
[ko te.na ma.na]
[ko tou̯ ma.lo.si te.na]

[pa.ti li.ma kae̯ ka.la.ŋa]
[u.lu.fo.nu ki te tu.pu]
[tu.va.lu ko tu sao̯.lo.to]
[ki te se ŋa.ta ma(.)i]

English lyrics

I
Tuvalu for the Almighty
Are the words we hold most dear
For as people or as leaders
Of Tuvalu we all share

In the knowledge that God
Ever rules in heav’n above,
And that we in this land
Are united in His love.

We build on a sure foundation
When we trust in God’s great law
“Tuvalu for the Almighty”
Be our song for evermore!

II
Let us trust our lives henceforward
To the King to whom we pray,
With our eyes fixed firmly on Him
He is showing us the way.

“May we reign with Him in glory”
Be our song for evermore,
for His almighty power
Is our strength from shore to shore.

Shout aloud in jubilation
To the King whom we adore.
“Tuvalu free and united”
Be our song for evermore!

== See also ==
- Afaese Manoa
