= Literature of Vanuatu =

The literature of Vanuatu, understood in the strict sense of written literature, began in the 1960s.

== History ==
What existed in precolonial Vanuatu was – and still is – oral literature, in the form of folk tales, myths, legends, sung poetry… transmitted by word of mouth across generations. Writing and literacy were introduced by missionaries and formal schools from the colonial period; the idea of using this technology for artistic purposes emerged late, and has been mostly restricted to urban social circles influenced by Western practices.

The emergence of ni-Vanuatu written literature took place in the context of the development of indigenous Pacific Islander literature in the Pacific region as a whole, beginning in the late 1960s. In 1968, the founding of the University of the South Pacific in Suva provided a stimulus for Pacific Islander literary aspirations.

Creative writing courses and workshops were set up. The South Pacific Arts Society was founded at the university in 1973, and published Pacific Islander literature (poetry and short stories) in the magazine Pacific Islands Monthly. In 1974, the Society founded the publishing house Mana Publications, followed in 1976 by the art and literature journal Mana. The journal published the first anthologies of ni-Vanuatu poetry.

Arguably Vanuatu's foremost literary figure was feminist poet Grace Molisa (1946-2002). The Australian has described her poems as "a biting social commentary on life in patriarchal, post-colonial Vanuatu." She wrote both in English and in Bislama.

In 2007, francophone singer-songwriter, musician and author Marcel Melthérorong (fr) published the first ever novel written by a Vanuatuan, through the Alliance Française: Tôghàn. His novel touched upon the sense of rootlessness of Pacific Islander youth, trying to find their bearings between Melanesian and Western values. When it was re-edited in 2009, Nobel Prize in Literature winner Jean-Marie Le Clézio wrote the preface, celebrating "a new and original voice" in francophone literature.

Vanuatu's literary scene is also notable for the Wan Smolbag community theatre group, established in 1989. The group writes and performs plays, in English and in Bislama, addressing educational topics such as "malaria and AIDS prevention, hurricane preparedness and domestic violence". Wan Smolbag performs regional tours in the South Pacific, and its plays are available on video throughout the region, where they are used for educational purposes. The theatre describes itself as using "drama to inform, raise awareness and encourage public discussion on a range of contemporary health, lifestyle, environment and governance issues".
