= Grace Mera Molisa =

Ni-Vanuatu politician, poet, and women's rights activist

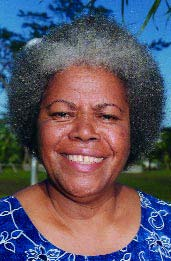
Grace Mera Molisa (2002)

Grace Mera Molisa (17 February 1946, Aoba Island – 4 January 2002, Port Vila) was a Ni-Vanuatu politician, poet and campaigner for women's equality in politics. The Australian described her as "a vanguard for Melanesian culture and a voice of the Vanuatuans, especially women". She has also been described as one of the Pacific's "leading public intellectuals and activists".

Molisa's education began at her village school on Aoba Island, and continued at the Mission School at Torgil. From there, she went on to attend Queen Victoria Māori Girls' School in Auckland, Aotearoa New Zealand. After leaving school, Molisa attended Auckland Teachers' College and returned to her old school at Torgil as a teacher. She became the first Ni-Vanuatu woman to head a large, senior co-educational boarding school when she was appointed Headmistress of Ombabulu School. Later, Molisa was the first woman from her country to gain a university degree, a Bachelor of Arts degree at the University of the South Pacific in 1977.

Molisa was an Anglican. She spoke five languages.

A 2004 book entitled Profiles of Pacific Women, aimed at "paying tribute to Pacific women who have paved the way for gender equality and human rights", included a tribute to Grace Molisa.

== Political career ==
In 1979, in the lead-up to Vanuatu's independence, and as a member of the Vanua'aku Pati, Molisa became second secretary of the Ministry of Social Affairs.

She created Vanuatu's National Arts Festival, and set up the committee which chose the nation's flag, anthem, coat of arms and national motto, "Long God Yumi Stanap". She was one of only two women members of the National Constitution Committee, and was a signatory of the Constitution of Vanuatu in 1979, along with her husband and fellow politician Sela Molisa.

She was spokeswoman for Prime Minister Walter Lini from 1987 to 1991.

In the 1990s, she was appointed to the Council of the University of the South Pacific, and became a member of Transparency International. In 1997, she founded Vanuatu Women in Politics (VWIP), a pressure group to aid women who wished to enter politics. When the Vanua'aku Pati did not endorse a single female candidate for 1998 general election, Molisa left the party, and coordinated the candidacies of six women candidates under the VWIP banner. That same year, she published a booklet listing 530 ni-Vanuatu women qualified for public duties, as a means of pressuring the government into appointing qualified women to public office.

She contributed a chapter on postcolonial politics to the scholarly compendium Remembrance of Pacific Pasts: An Invitation to Remake History, edited by Robert Borofsky and published in 2000. Other contributors included Albert Wendt, Vilsoni Hereniko, Marshall Sahlins, James Belich, Gyan Prakash, Edward Said and Epeli Hauʻofa.

== Literary career ==
Molisa published Blackstone, a collection of her poems, in 1983. In 1987, she published Colonised People : Poems. The Australian has described her poems as "a biting social commentary on life in patriarchal, post-colonial Vanuatu." In 1995, she published Pasifik paradaes, written in Bislama.

Selina Tusitala Marsh, former New Zealand Poet Laureate and Professor of English at the University of Auckland, has described her as one of the three "foremothers of Pasifika poetry", along with Konai Helu Thaman of Tonga and Haunani-Kay Trask of Hawaii. Marsh's extensive research essay has been published in Cordite Poetry Review.

Poetry by Molisa was included in UPU, a curation of Pacific Island writers’ work which was first presented at the Silo Theatre as part of the Auckland Arts Festival in March 2020. UPU was remounted as part of the Kia Mau Festival in Wellington in June 2021.
