= Solomon Islands dance =

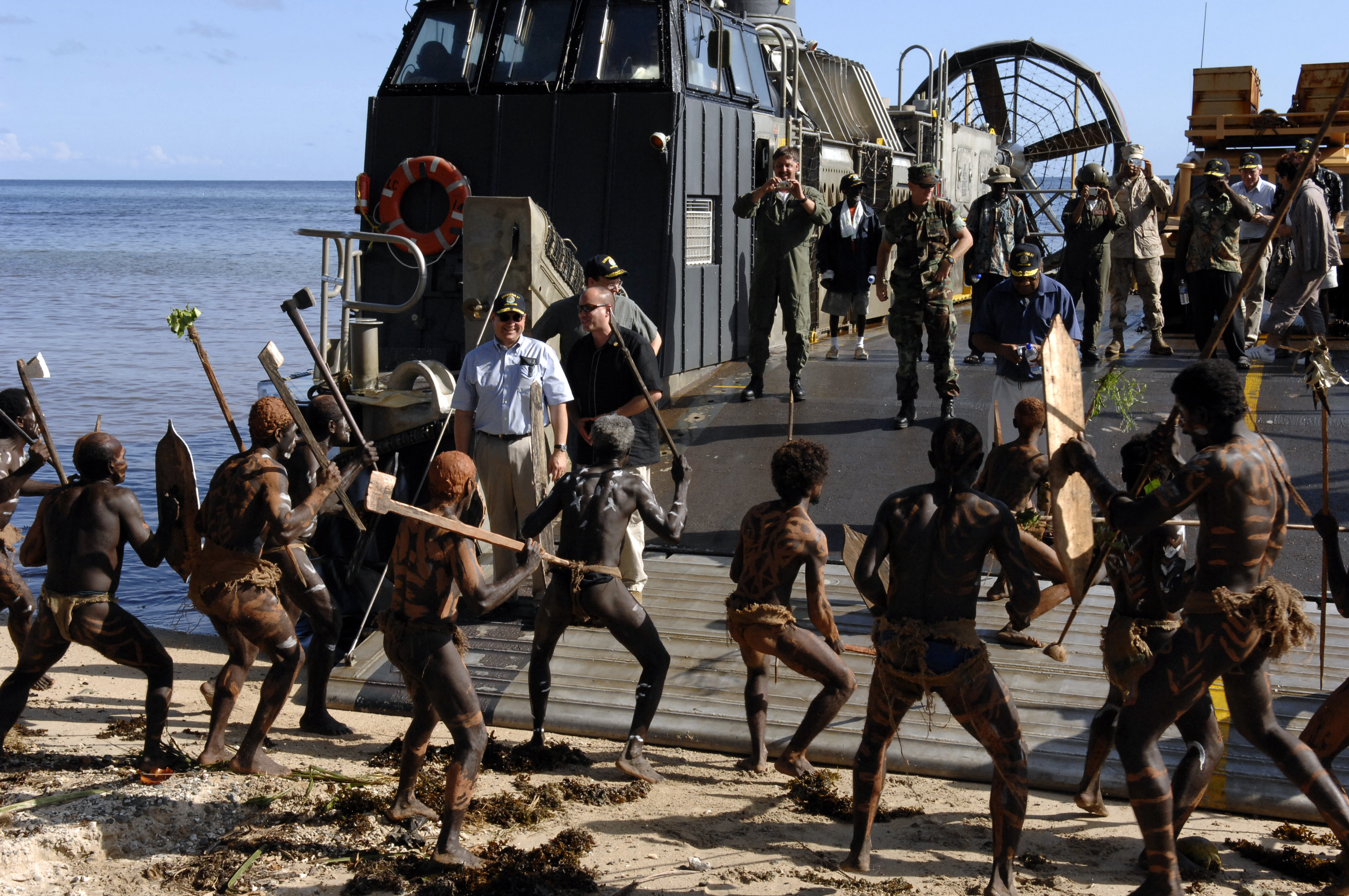
A tribal dance at Sasamungga, Choiseul Island.

Solomon Islands dance is part of the culture of the Solomon Islands. Dances are performed at ceremonies and special occasions, as well as on a regular basis in some hotels and restaurants, which feature local musicians performing traditional songs and dance. The National Museum of Solomon Islands at Point Cruz also organises live dances and other cultural displays of its provinces.

== Types ==
In 1974, Polynesian Dances of Bellona (Mungiki), which included suahongi form and which had been forbidden to be performed during the 1940s by the Christian missionaries, was revived and recorded in Honiara. Suahongi, performed by men, is enacted at the conclusion of the manga'e ceremony, a ritual of sharing the surplus harvest of fish and garden crops. The dance is performed to songs which are set in the form of "feature call and response, speech–song" and highly rhythmic; music notes included the short history of the island of Bellona.

At Rennel (Munggava) and Bellona (Mungiki), two islands administered by Solomon Islands, dance and music were banned by the missionaries, but revived during World War II. Suahongi (meaning a "circle", or to "hover about"), is an important dance form in the Bellonese tradition. It is a ritual dance which lasts for about half an hour, has three parts, and is performed by men. The first part, called the buatanga, is performed in circles while the other two parts are done in lines.

Jane Mink Rossen revived this dance-music form and wrote about it in her book "Songs of Bellona Island (1987)". An LP of the same name, refers to it as "coordinate polyphony" of two songs rendered simultaneously. Other dances described by Rossen include Mako hakapaungo (a line dance performed by men with "fighting clubs and staffs"); Hua patti, a mixed type of dance; Mako hakasaunoni, which is performed by men folk accompanied by clapping of hands; mako nagangi, another dance form originating from Tikopia is known as ngongole.

In Tikopia, the most formal festival dances occur during the monsoon season. Dance variations included Te mako e ta (the dance is beaten), mako po (clapped dances), mako rima (arm/hand dances), mako rakau (dances with wooden implements), and mako lasi (big dances). It has been said to Firth that, "The one work of Tikopia is the dance". He describes the 'dancing impulse' as being so strong in Tikopia that it is "almost obsessional behaviour".

The funeral dance of the Solomon Islands was described by Henry Brougham Guppy in 1887:

With their faces white with lime they formed a large circle, in the centre of which were four posts placed erect in the ground, each about ten feet high, charred on one side and rudely carved in imitation of the human head, two of them painted red and two white. Enclosed in the ring and grouped around the posts were six women bearing in their hands the personal belongings of the deceased, such as her basket and cushion. To the slow and measured time of the beats of a wooden drum, a hollowed log struck by a man outside the circle, the dancers of the ring adapted their move merits, which consisted merely in raising the feet in turns and gently stamping on the ground. The central group of women danced around the posts, partly skipping, partly hopping, each woman holding up before her the article she bore, and regulating her steps to the beats of the drum. Now and then the man at the drum quickened his time, and the movements of the women of the ring became more spirited; whilst the central group of dancers skipped more actively around, the foremost woman sprinkled at each bound handfuls of lime over the dancers of the ring.

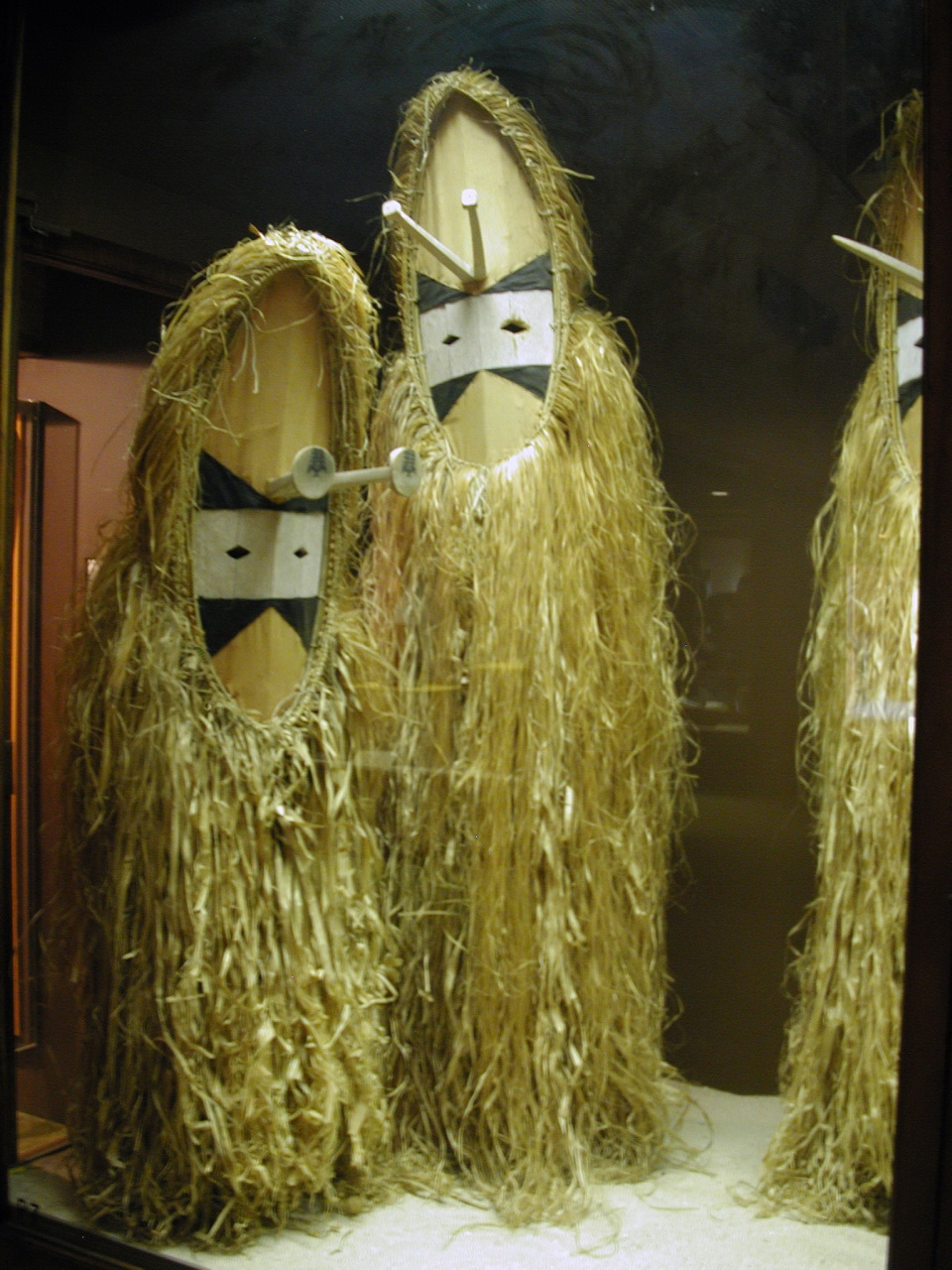
A dance costume from the island of Vanikoro.

The present rage in dancing style among the youth of the Islands is the "freestyle dancing" which has become integral to the night life and entertainment scene. These dance forms, with no resemblance to the traditional dance forms of Solomon Island, are copied from the films 'You Got Served', 'Step Up 1 and 2' and 'Stomp the Yard'.

== Music and costumes ==
Dancing is often accompanied by bamboo bands, and panpipes are a popular accompaniment. Women are often topless while performing dance in the Solomon Islands; in some of the western islands, they may wear breechcloth made from blue-dyed tapa cloth as a wrap-around skirt. In Tamate dance, performers wore whole body costumes made of bamboo with a curious mythological appearance.
