= New Caledonian literature =

Written New Caledonian literature (as distinct from oral literature) is very recent.

The New Caledonian Writers Association is an important advocacy group for literary activity in the islands.

The Oceanian International Book Fair (French: Salon international du Livre océanien, acronym SILO) has been a relevant meeting point since 2003.
