= Afaese Manoa =

Tuvaluan writer and musician (born 1942)

Afaese Manoa (born 1942 in Tuvalu) is a Tuvaluan writer and musician.

== National anthem of Tuvalu ==
Afaese Manoa is the author of words and music to an anthem, Tuvalu mo te Atua (Tuvalu for the Almighty), in the Tuvaluan language. In 1978, the year of Tuvalu's independence from the United Kingdom, Manoa's anthem lyrics and music were adopted as the national anthem of Tuvalu.

== Reputation as writer ==
Manoa is the best-known writer in a language which has relatively little literature. Along with other Oceanic writers, such as Joanne Gobure of Nauru, his best-known writing evinces a strong sense of religious vocation.
