= Russell Soaba =

Writer from Papua New Guinea

Russell Soaba (born 1950, Tototo, Milne Bay) is a writer from Papua New Guinea, who was educated there, in Australia and in the United States at Brown University. Soaba played a major role in the literary scene during the early years of the University of Papua New Guinea and remains one of Papua New Guinea's most prolific writers. He now also works as an editor at Anuki Country Press and a lecturer at the University of Papua New Guinea.

== Published works ==
- 1977 Wanpis
- 1978 Naked Thoughts: Poems & Illustrations
- 1978 How
- 1979 Ondobondo Poster Poems
- 1979 Maiba
- 2000 Kwamra, A Season Of Harvest: Poems
- 2026 The Bird in the Bird Dance
