= Luelen Bernart =

Micronesian historian

Luelen Bernart (Pohnpei 1866-1946) was the first Micronesian to write a book and Pohnpei's first historian. He is the author of The Book of Luelen. The book traces the history of Pohnpei from before the first European contact, including local myths, legends, and botanical lore.
