= John Saunana =

Solomon Islands writer (1945–2013)

John Selwyn Saunana OBE
- Born: 1945; Arosi, Makira, Solomon Islands
- Died: April 30, 2013 (aged 67–68)
- Education: University of Papua New Guinea
- Occupations: Writer, politician
- Notable work: The Alternative (1980)

John Selwyn Saunana, OBE (1945 – April 30, 2013) was a Solomon Islands writer and politician, known for his 1980 novel The Alternative, the first novel ever published by a Solomon Islander.

== Early life and education ==
Saunana was born in 1945 in the town of Arosi on the island of Makira, the third most populous of the Solomon Islands. He was educated at the King George VI School in the Solomons capital city of Honiara, Guadalcanal. In 1971, he earned a bachelor's degree from the University of Papua New Guinea, located in Port Moresby, Papua New Guinea.

== Career ==
Before moving into politics, Saunana worked in a far-flung variety of jobs, including an attendant at a mental hospital, a waiter, a research assistant, and a training officer for the U.S Peace Corps.

He represented the Solomon Islands as an athlete at the 1969 South Pacific Games.

=== Civil service ===
In 1977, Saunana was elected to the Legislative Assembly as the representative for West Makira. He was later appointed Minister of Education and Training, then Deputy Secretary to the Cabinet.

He was named an Officer of the Order of the British Empire (OBE) as part of Queen Elizabeth II's 2007 Birthday Honours list for the Commonwealth realms. He received the award "for services to politics and to public administration".

=== Literary career ===
Though his fame rests on his novel, Saunana also published three poetry books before entering politics. His first poems and stories were published in Papua New Guinea, where he went to college.

He was the first Solomon Islands writer to have a collection of poetry in the Papua Pocket Poets series published by the University of Papua New Guinea Press, one of the first major focuses on Pacific Islands writing. They included 1972's Dragon Tree: Arosi Incantations and Songs, a collection of his translations of traditional song texts in the Arosi language; the book-length poem Cruising Through the Reverie (1972); and She (1973). He also appeared in (and co-edited) the 1977 anthology Twenty-Four Poems of the Solomon Islands.

His 1980 novel, The Alternative, was the first and remains one of the few novels to emerge from the Solomon Islands literary community (along with Rexford Orotaloa's Two Times Resurrection), which has generally produced short stories. In the journal Ariel, Robert Viking O'Brien has suggested that this is in part because most of the writers in the region came from the educated elite, as well as the fact that the short story is closer in spirit to the traditional tale.

The Alternative is an anticolonialist work which tells the story of the independence movement in the Solomon Islands via a decade in the life of a young student in the 1960s, who finds himself caught between his traditional village life and the British-run school system.

O'Brien noted that "much of The Alternative is transparently autobiographical" and reflects Saunana's own education as well as his agreement with the goals of independence from Britain. Jo Rudd, writing in the magazine Pacific Islands Monthly, said that Saunana "writes with feeling and deep sympathy" for the people of the Solomons "during the difficult period of decolonization" from British rule, adding that "though the story is simply told, [...] the final effect is one of power and hope." John D. McLaren, in New Pacific Literatures: Culture and Environment in the European Pacific, wrote that "The dialogue in Saunana's novel is stilted, except when it is in the local pidgin, and we learn little of the inner motivation of the characters." However, he felt the novel effectively critiqued both the "seductive power" and the rigid authoritarian nature of European capitalism and colonialism.

Before his death, Saunana was also president of the Solomon Islands Creative Writers Association.

== Death ==
Saunana died on April 30, 2013.

== Bibliography ==
- Dragon Tree: Arosi Incantation and Songs (Port Moresby: Papua Pocket Poets, 1972)
- Cruising Through The Reverie: A Poem (Port Moresby: Papua Pocket Poets, 1972)
- She: Poems (Port Moresby: Papua Pocket Poets, 1972)
- Twenty-Four Poems of the Solomon Islands (co-editor; Honoria: USP Centre, 1977)
- The Alternative (Honiara: USP SI Centre, South Pacific Creative Arts Society and The Institute of Pacific Studies, 1980)
