= Rexford Orotaloa =

Solomon Islands writer (born 1956)

Rexford Tom Orotaloa
- Born: 1956 (age 68–69); Malaita, Solomon Islands
- Occupation: Writer
- Notable work: Two Times Resurrection, Suremada: Faces from a Solomon Island Village

Rexford Tom Orotaloa (born 1956) is a Solomon Islands writer best known for the novel Two Times Resurrection and the story collection Suremada: Faces from a Solomon Island Village. His work often focuses on the conflict between modern and traditional culture.

== Early life ==
Orotaloa was born in 1956 and raised in a village on the island of Malaita in the Solomon Islands. He was raised by his grandfather, who taught him traditional tribal chants and songs. He was educated at the King George VI School in the Solomons capital city of Honiara, Guadalcanal.

== Career ==
Orotaloa has published two books, the novel Two Times Resurrection (1989) and the story collection Suremada: Faces from a Solomon Island Village (1985). His writing blends the European-style literary short story with the traditional oral folk tales of his islands, and often uses creolized English. He has also published poetry.

Orotaloa also worked as a teacher and secretary to the local court in Malaita.

== Critical reception ==
Two Times Resurrection is one of the few novels to emerge from the Solomon Islands literary community (along with John Saunana's The Alternative), which has generally produced short stories. Robert Viking O'Brien noted its "elegiac tone" and said that Orotaloa "depicts the capitalist transformation of the Solomon Islands and an individual's struggle to survive that transformation without losing what he values in traditional Melanesian society." In the journal World Literature Today, Stephen Oxenham wrote that the novel's "fusion of oral and literary convention gives it a peculiar power and charm". He called Orotaloa "a writer of unusual and highly individual perception," whose work "is unlikely to have any counterpart in modern Pacific writing."

The Pacific Islands: An Encyclopedia said that Orotaloa's "episodic semi-autobiography and loosely connected stories can be ungainly at times, but are always lively." Samoan poet and writer Albert Wendt, in Nuanua: Pacific Writing in English Since 1980, praised Orotaloa's "complex storytelling style" and use of traditional mythology and oral literary techniques.
