= Konai Helu Thaman =

Tongan poet and academic

- Born: 1946 (age 79–80); Nukuʻalofa, Tonga
- Education: University of Auckland (BA); University of California, Santa Barbara (MA); University of the South Pacific (PhD).
- Occupations: Poet and academic

Konai Helu Thaman (born 1946) is a poet and academic from Tonga. Thaman is one of the major poets and researchers that emerged from the Pacific during what she has called the ‘golden age’ of Pacific literature.

== Early life and education ==
Thaman was born in 1946 in the city of Nuku'alofa, Tonga. She attended Free Wesleyan Primary School and later entered Tonga High School.

Thaman studied at the University of Auckland where she graduated with a Bachelor of Arts in geography in 1967. Then completed a year at the Auckland Secondary Teachers' College. From 1972 to 1973, Thaman worked as a research assistant in the United States at the University of California, Santa Barbara where she graduated with a master's degree in education. She later completed a PhD in education at the University of the South Pacific (USP) in 1988.

== Career ==
Between 1969 and 1972, Thaman was a teacher in Tonga at Tonga High School. She has worked at the University of the South Pacific since 1974 and currently holds a Personal Chair in Pacific Education and Culture, a position she has held since its establishment in 1998. She has also held management positions at the university including Director of the Institute of Education, Head of the School of Humanities, and Pro-vice-chancellor.

As an academic researcher, Thaman has been widely published, with a focus on education (including indigenous and teacher education), curriculum development, and sustainable development (with a focus on the Pacific context).

Thaman has held several positions with UNESCO. Between 1998–2006 she was the UNESCO Chair in Teacher Education and Culture. She was a member of the UNESCO Asia Pacific Scientific Committee on Research in Higher Education as well as the Global Monitoring Committee for the Decade of Education for Sustainable Development. She is currently a Fellow of the Asia-Pacific Programme of Educational Innovation for Development and member of the Committee of Experts on the Application of the Recommendation concerning the Status of Teachers.

Poetry by Thaman has been used in primary and secondary education across the Pacific region.

Thaman was the recipient of the 1996 Rusiate Nayacakalou Award. Selected poetry by Thaman was included in UPU, a curation of Pacific Island writers’ work which was first presented at the Silo Theatre as part of the Auckland Arts Festival in March 2020. UPU was remounted as part of the Kia Mau Festival in Wellington, New Zealand in June 2021.

Her poems have been translated into multiple languages, including German by Renate von Gizyckia, in the collection of poems titled Inselfeuer (Reihe Literatur des Pazifik, 1986). Her poems are also in several anthologies including Fire in the Sea: An Anthology of Poetry and Art and Nuanua: Pacific Writing in English since 1980.

== Personal life ==
Thaman is married to Randy Thaman, Professor at the University of South Pacific since February, 1974 and researcher of all the USP member countries. Thaman is the mother to two children and is currently residing in Suva, Fiji where she is still working for USP.

== Published works ==
=== Poetry collections ===
- Songs of Love (Mana Publications, 1999)
- Kakala (Mana Publications, 1993)
- Hingano (Mana Publications, 1987)
- Langakali (Mana Publications, 1981)
- You the choice of my parents (Mana Publications, 1974)

== Honours ==
National honours

- Order of Queen Sālote Tupou III, Grand Cross (31 July 2008).
