= Epeli Hauʻofa =

Tongan and Fijian writer and anthropologist

- Born: 1939; Territory of Papua, New Guinea
- Died: 11 January 2009 (aged 69); Suva, Fiji
- Resting place: Wainadoi, Fiji
- Citizenship: Fiji
- Education: PhD in Social Anthropology
- Alma mater: Lelean Memorial School; University of New England; McGill University; Australian National University
- Occupations: novelist, social anthropologist
- Spouse: Barbara Hauʻofa
- Children: Epeli Siʻi Hauʻofa
- Writing career
- Language: English, Tongan, Fijian
- Period: 1981–2009
- Genres: fiction, non-fiction, historical fiction, poetry, social, essays
- Subjects: modernisation, development. south pacific islanders
- Notable works: Mekeo: Inequality and Ambivalence in a Village Society, Tales of the Tikongs, We Are the Ocean: Selected Works

Epeli Hauʻofa (7 December 1939 – 11 January 2009) was a Tongan and Fijian writer and anthropologist born of Tongan missionary parents in the Territory of Papua. He lived in Fiji and taught at the University of the South Pacific (USP). He was the founder of the Oceania Centre for Arts at the USP.

== Biography ==
Hauʻofa was born to Tongan missionary parents working in Papua New Guinea. At his death, he was a citizen of Fiji, living in Wainadoi, Fiji. He went to school in Papua New Guinea, Tonga and Suva, and attended the University of New England, Armidale, New South Wales; McGill University, Montreal; and the Australian National University, Canberra, where he gained a PhD in social anthropology, published in 1981 with the title Mekeo: Inequality and Ambivalence in a Village Society. He taught as a tutor at the University of Papua New Guinea, and was a research fellow at the University of the South Pacific in Suva, Fiji. From 1978 to 1981 he was Deputy Private Secretary to His Majesty the King of Tonga, serving as the keeper of palace records. During his time in Tonga, Hauʻofa co-produced the literary magazine Faikava with his wife Barbara. In early 1981 he re-joined the University of the South Pacific as the first director of the newly created Rural Development Centre based in Tonga.

He subsequently taught sociology at the University of the South Pacific and, in 1983, he became Head of the Department of Sociology at the University's main campus in Suva. In 1997, Hauʻofa became the founder and director of the Oceania Centre for Arts and Culture at the USP in Suva. The intention of the space being to amplify Pacific cultures, students, and knowledges for "spaces where we give free rein to our imagination and ample time to experiment with and develop new forms and styles, new movements, sounds, and voices, that are unmistakably [Pacific] ours."

=== Writing ===
He was the author of Mekeo: Inequality and Ambivalence in a Village Society; Tales of the Tikongs, which deals (through fiction) with indigenous South Pacific Islander responses to the changes and challenges brought by modernisation and development; Kisses in the Nederends, a novel; and, more recently, We Are the Ocean, a selection of earlier works, including fiction, poetry and essays. Tales of the Tikongs was translated into Danish in 2002 by John Allan Pedersen (as Stillehavsfortællinger, ISBN 87-7514-076-4)

The BBC History magazine writes that Hauʻofa provided a "reconceptualisation of the Pacific": In his "influential essay Our Sea of Islands", he argued that Pacific Islanders "were connected rather than separated by the sea. Far from being sea-locked peoples marooned on coral or volcanic tips of land, islanders formed an oceanic community based on voyaging." The reframing of the Pacific from "Islands from a Far Sea" to "A Sea of Islands" offered a change from a "belittlement" of the islands to an "enlargement" in regard to the Pacific on a global scale. It centers Pacific Islanders relationships to each other, as historically and presently embedded, and their relationships as navigators of the vast sea.

The essay Our Sea of Islands was published in A New Oceania : Rediscovering our Sea of Islands, co-edited by Hauʻofa, Vijay Naidu and Eric Waddell, published in 1993.

=== Death ===
Hauʻofa died at the Suva Private Hospital in Suva at 7 AM on 11 January 2009 at the age of sixty-nine. He was survived by his wife, Barbara, and son, Epeli Siʻi. A funeral service was held at the University of the South Pacific campus in Suva on 15 January 2009. He was buried at his residence in Wainadoi, Fiji.

=== Legacy ===
Hauʻofa was awarded a posthumous honorary doctorate in literature by the University of Auckland in 2023.
