= Honiara Botanic Gardens =

The Honiara Botanic Gardens are located in Rove, Honiara, Solomon Islands. They are about 2 kilometres (1.2 mi) west of the main center off the Tandai Highway on Garden Drive (opposite the Iron Bottom Sound Hotel). Garden Drive meanders around the prison complex and is just past the Solomon Islands Broadcasting buildings.

The Rove Botanical Gardens is located immediately behind the Rove Prison. Once a showpiece of Whitmore's collection and Geoff Dennis gardening the gardens deteriorated in the 1980s. Following a publication by C.P Henderson and I.R Hancock in 1988, a New Zealand volunteer David Glenny, Geoff Dennis, and Myknee Qusa Sirikolo rehabilitated the collections in 1990.

Photos of Honiara Botanical Gardens at Rove
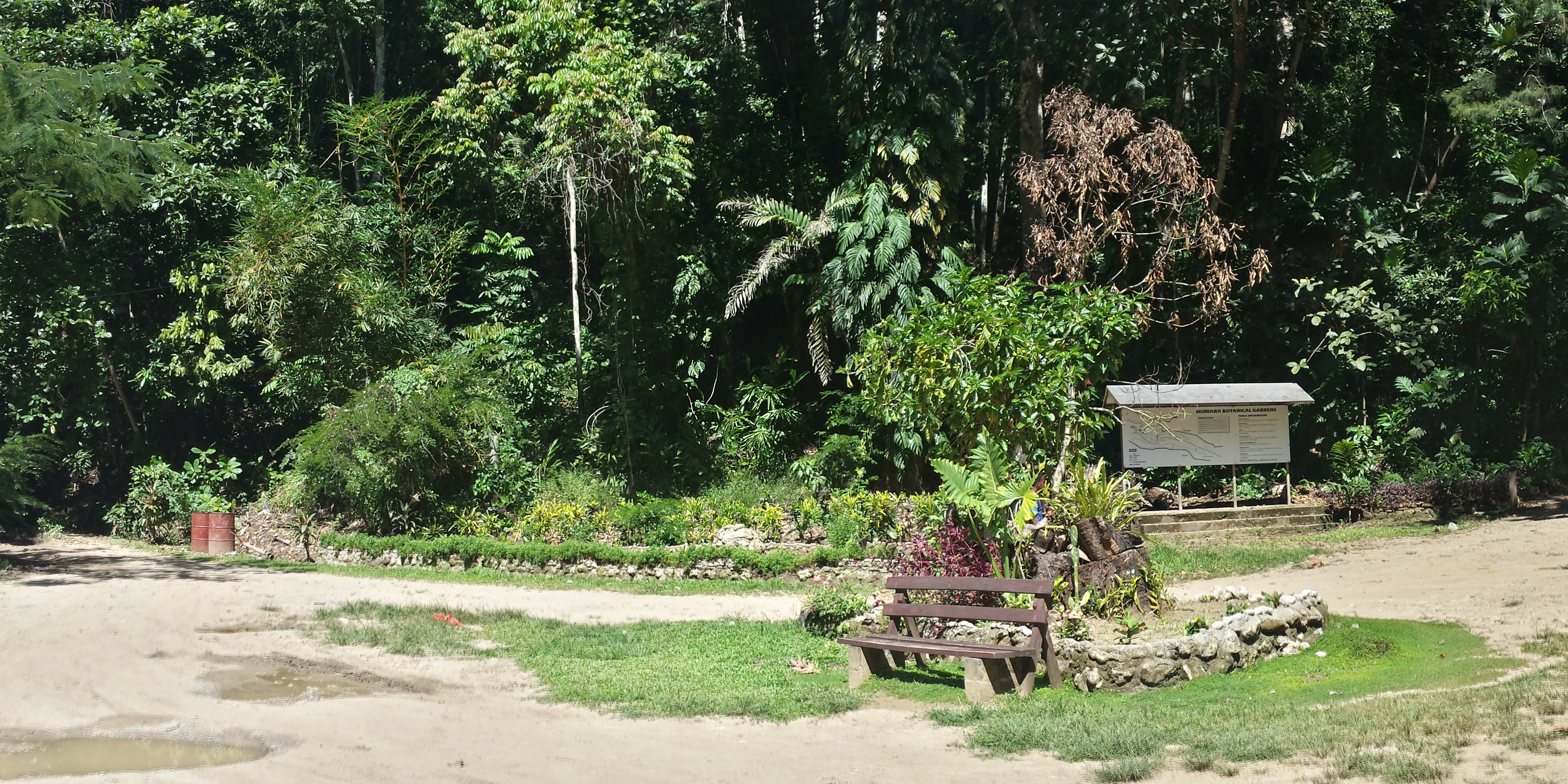
Rove Botanical Gardens, Rove, Honiara Solomon Islands

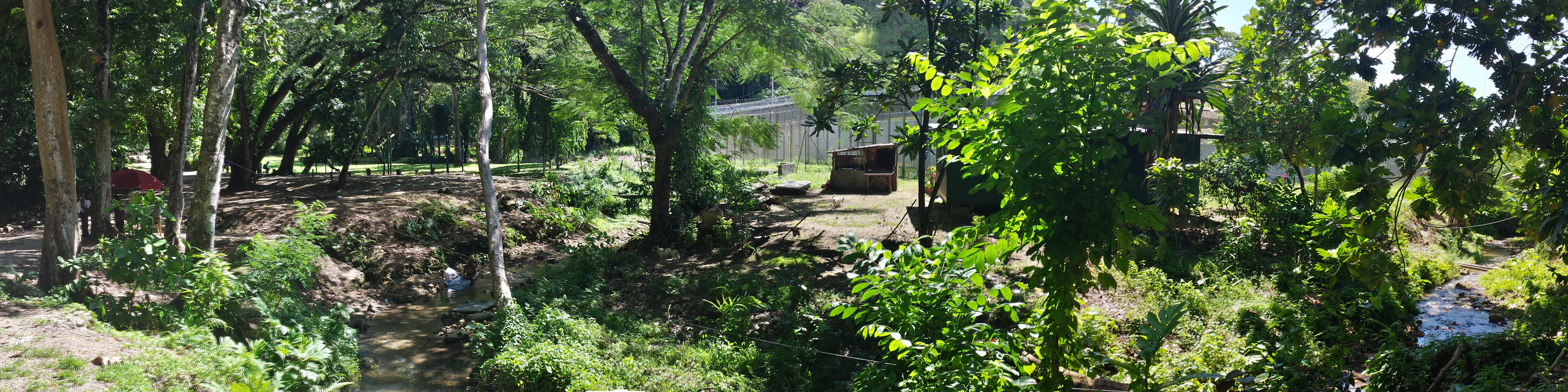
Panoramic photo of Rove Creek at Botanical Gardens behind prison.

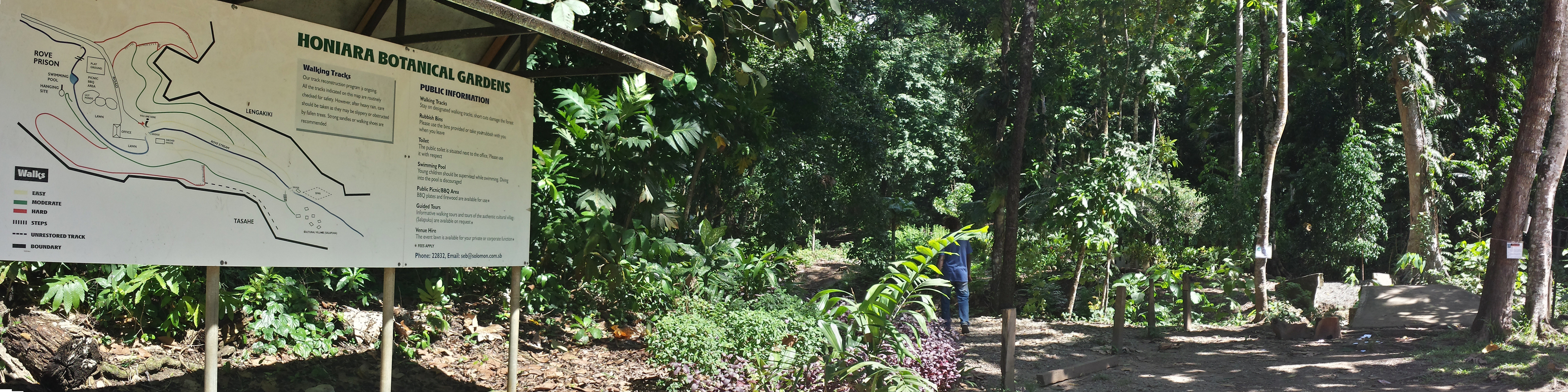
Panoramic photo of Botanical Gardens, Rove Honiara Solomon Islands. Note the hanging spot marked on the sign
