= Vuhokesa =

- Suburb
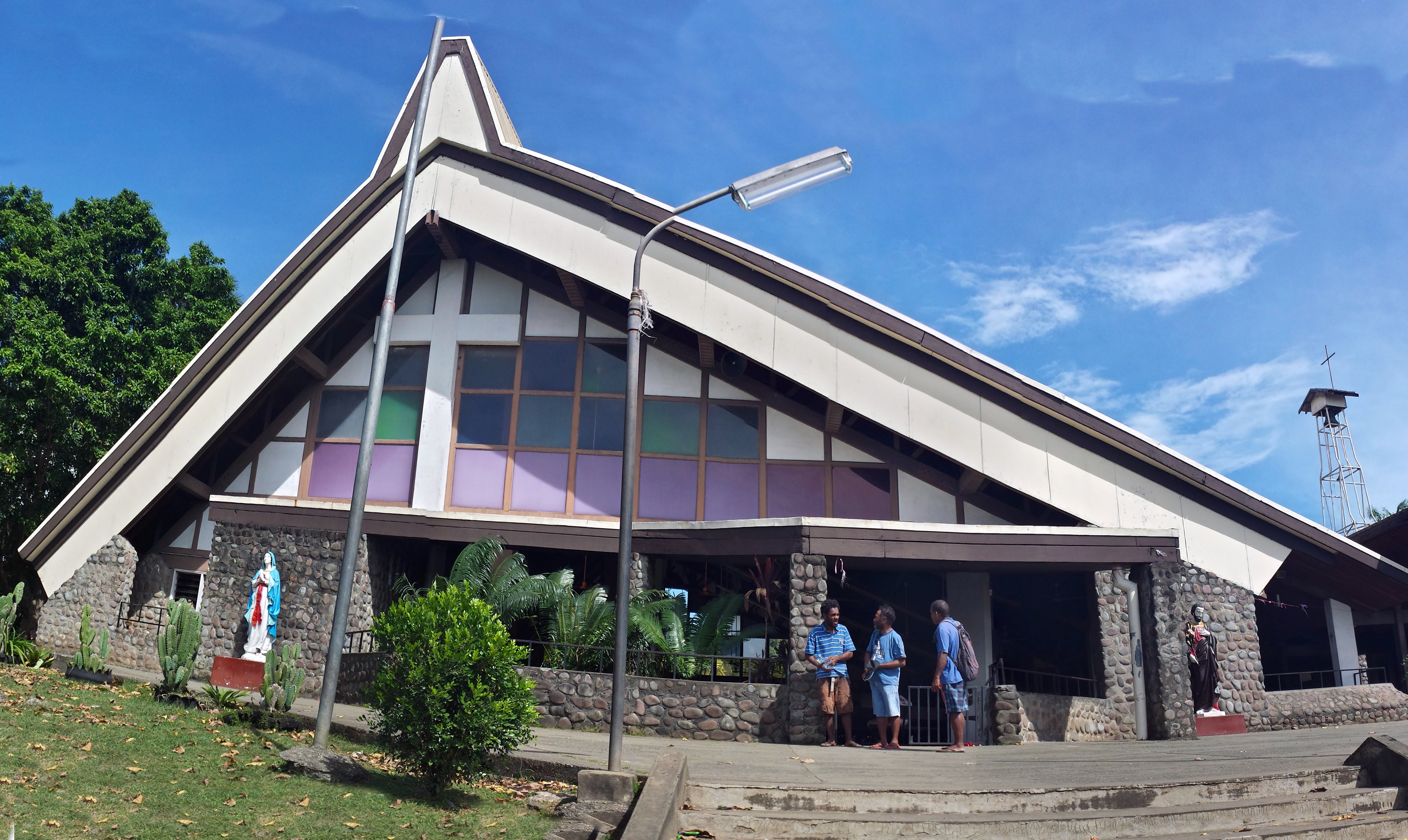
- Holy Cross Catholic Cathedral, St Mary.

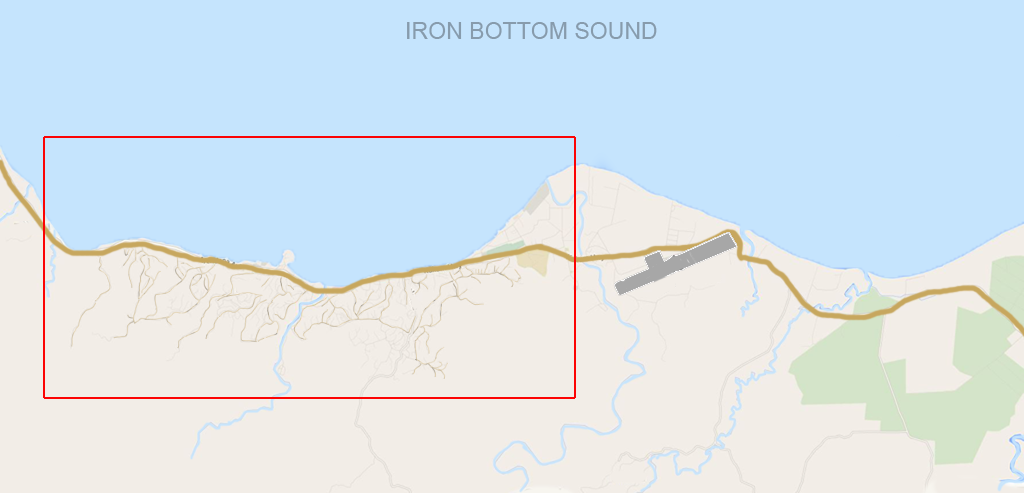
- Location in Honiara (Council boundary-red box)
- Coordinates: 9°26′S 159°57′E
- Country: Solomon Islands
- Province: Honiara Town
- Island: Guadalcanal
- Elevation: 29–100 m (95–328 ft)
- Time zone: UTC+11 (UTC)

Vuhokesa is a suburb in Honiara located in the main center on the Tandai Highway and includes the City Council roundabout. Vuhokesa is in the Honiara City Council ward of Vavaea. and is East of Point Cruz and West of Lord Howe Settlement. The Vuhokesa border is the West bank of the Mataniko River which runs into Kua Bay.

== Mamana Water Settlement ==
The Mamana Water Settlement as well as the Lord Howe Settlement are squeezed in between the main road and the shore line, a distance of 30–100 metres. The land is not suitable for agriculture except for small garden beds. However, brick-making using sand is practised at Mamana while at Lord Howe, the sand beach is used for beach soccer tournaments.

In 2012 the Mamana Water Community were the first group of women to graduate from Sistas Savve and participated in a fundraiser to build a permanent leaf hut where they can organize, meet and create their products. Clean-up Honiara campaigns often focus around the Mamana Water Settlement.

The Mamana Water Settlement as well as the Lord Howe Settlement is often inundated with tidal surges, especially during the wet season.

Settlements including Lord Howe, Mamana Water and Fishing Village (Fishery) are the most vulnerable for inundation in the city as they are situated right on the coastline. Extreme high tide coupled with storm can inundate these settlements as they are only 5 meters away from the high tide water line.

== Honiara Central Magistrate's Court ==
The Magistrate's Court has civil jurisdiction and can hear claims in contract or tort where the amount does not exceed SBC 2000 (principal Magistrate SBC 6000). The criminal jurisdiction of the magistrate's courts varies according to the class of magistrate. All classes of magistrates have jurisdiction to try criminal matters summarily while the Principal Magistrate has jurisdiction in relation to offences that carry punishment up to 14 years and may only impose a term of imprisonment of five years or a fine of $1,000 or both.

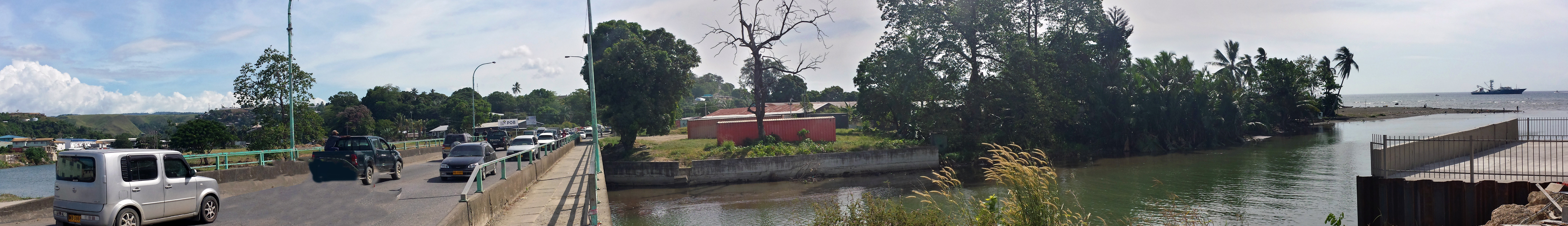
Bridge over Mataniko River facing Vuhokesa. Guadalcanal American Memorial to left. Kua Bay to right. Honiara

== Honiara City Council buildings ==
The Honiara Town Council (HTC) was created between 1956 and 1958. The Town Council was constituted under the 1957 Town Council Ordinance by a warrant issued by the High Commissioner on 1 March 1958, although the first full elections were not held until 1969.

The Honiara City Council was established under section four (4) of the Honiara City Act 1999 to make provision for the establishment of a City Council for the Honiara City; to prescribe its functions and powers and for matters connected therewith. The council services include Health, City Growth, Education and Recreation Services and the Environment and the nine divisions of the council include, Finance, Law Enforcement, Physical Planning, Administration, Works, Market, Education, Youth, Sports & Women's Affairs and Health and Medical Services.

== Library ==
The Solomon Islands Public Library, situated near the Mataniko River just outside Chinatown in Honiara, was opened by Rev. Charles Fox (q.v.) in August 1968. The National Library of Solomon Islands was then established in 1974 with the aim of reorganising existing library services and extending reading services to the entire nation.

In 2003 during the civil war, the library was mostly destroyed and in 2005 the Australian Capital Territory (ACT) government donated a large quantity of books to the library.

== Ita Hardware ==
The Dettke family of German origin was said to own the ITA hardware, a very large building in Vuhokesa. Bodo Dettke was a prominent politician in Solomon Islands.

== Hyundai Mall building ==
The Hyundai mall building is Honiara's newest shopping center and houses several medical facilities, embassies and commercial businesses and banking facilities. The developer, Korean Enterprises Ltd., at the time of planning, promised "the largest retail and commercial building in Solomon Islands". Designed by Pacific Architect Limited, the three-storey building covers 10,000 square meters.

== Alvaro building ==
A professional services building located in Mendana Ave. Possibly named after Alvaro Mendana.

== Central Market ==
The Honiara Central Market is managed by the Honiara Central Market Vendor's Association whose aim is to ensure Honiara Central Market is safe, healthy and economically conducive workplace for all by strengthening communication with Market Management, representing market vendors' needs and interests and identifying opportunities for market vendors to learn and develop new skills. The association was formed in 2014 to promote the rights and interests of stallholders and to help improve conditions at the Solomon Islands biggest market.

The market is regulated by the Honiara City Council, and specific items are permitted to be sold providing the stallholder pay the appropriate fees.

In 1976, the Chief Minister,(later Prime Minister), Solomon Mamaloni addressed strikers at the Central Market who were protesting about the introduction of self-government. Protesters were later dispersed with tear gas.

In 1989, riots broke out in Honiara over a sign displayed at the Central Market purportedly by the Bellonese that was designed to insult the majority Malaitan population. The Prime Minister, Solomon Mamaloni, warned that the troubles had the potential to develop into a lethal cancer. Several years later, ethnic violence increased and resulted in civil war.

== Tourism ==
- Island Lodge
- Quality Motel / Rockhaven Inn - Lekamboli Lane, Lower Vavaya Ridge
- Sea King restaurant

== Churches ==
=== South Seas Evangelical Church ===
- South Seas Evangelical Church (SSEC) Headquarters

=== Holy Cross Cathedral St Marys ===
Laracy (1976, 11) states that the Spanish expeditions to the Solomons in 1568, 1595 and 1605 were for exploration, colonisation and spreading the gospel. The French Marists first reached the Solomon Islands on 2 December 1845, led by Bishop Epalle and later formed the Melanesia and Micronesia district of Marists under Bishop Epalle with headquarters at Makira until the death of Bishop Epalle where attempts were abandoned. Catholic missionaries returned to the Solomons in 1898 when Bishop Julian Vidal landed at Tulagi settling on small Rua Sura Island off Aola Bay, Guadalcanal. Land was purchased at Tangarare in South Guadalcanal in May 1898 and two priests were installed in June 1900.

The Visale (NW Guadalcanal) Cathedral was destroyed in a severe earthquake on 25 January 1925 and later rebuilt in 1930. By 1918 there were 3000 Catholic conversions on Guadalcanal. As a result of World War 2 the missions from Visale moved back to Tangarare due to safety reasons and then were evacuated by the Americans to Caledonia as the Japanese believed Marists were collaborating with the Allies. After World War 2 Bishop Epalle relocated to Kakabona using a small leaf chapel and later a Quonset hut and the Tanagai Mission Station was established. The remains of the Visale printing press were brought to Kakabona, where the Bishop made his headquarters at Tanagai. In 1946 twenty Marist students were sent to Fiji to study to become Marist brothers.

Bishop Aubin (1934–1949) at Tanagai Mission Station purchased the hill of Vatuliva from the Town Council in 1947. The hill located in Vuhokesa is the site of the Holy Cross Cathedral St Marys. It was written that Mendana erected a cross and a chapel on the hill.

In December 1966, Pope Paul VI established a new ecclesiastical hierarchy for Papua New Guinea and the Solomon Islands. The Vicar Apostolic of the South Solomons, Daniel W. Stuyvenberg (q.v.), was styled Bishop of Honiara, and Gizo Diocese was under Irishman Bishop Eusebius Crawford. Both were to be suffragans of the Metropolitan See of Rabaul. Dominicans ran the Gizo-based diocese, and Marists the Honiara-based diocese. In recognition that the Marists lacked the capacity to serve all of the Solomons, but the war halted progress and it was not until January 1956 that Dominican priests, friars and sisters set out from Australia to Gizo. They purchased Loga, an old Lever Brothers plantation a short canoe trip from Gizo, and set to work. They also purchased a Mission ship, the Salve Regina. In 1959, the Western District became an apostolic vicariate in its own right under Bishop Crawford. (O'Brien 1995, 157–170)

== Solomon Islands Water Authority ==
The head office for SIWA is located in Vuhokesa on the highway near the Mataniko River

The Solomon Islands Water Authority is a state-owned enterprise wholly owned by the Government of Solomon Islands. It is mandated to operate as the provider of municipal water and wastewater services in Solomon Islands by the SIWA Act of 1992. As a state-owned enterprise it is also subject to the State-Owned Enterprise Act of 2007 modified in 2010. The Authority is governed by an independent Board of Directors, appointed by the responsible Ministers in accordance with the State Owned Enterprises Act, 2007. The Board is responsible for the prudent and transparent governance of the organisation. It reports to Minister of Mines, Energy and Rural Electrification and to the Minister of Finance.

Photos of Vuhokesa landmarks
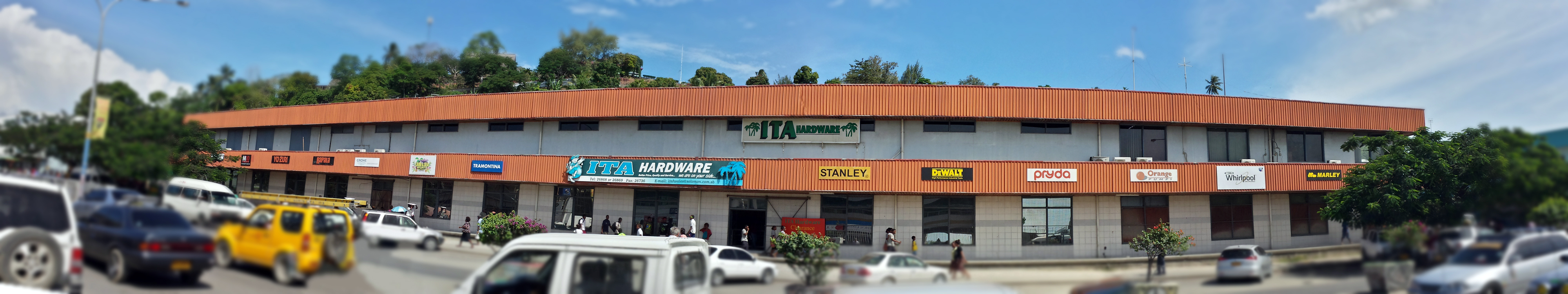
Ita Hardware, Mendana Ave, Honiara

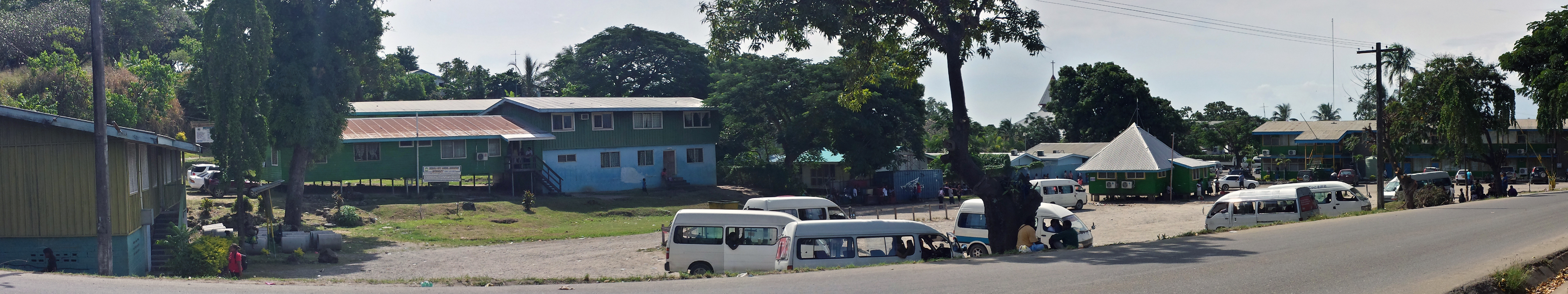
Honiara City Council buildings and Central Magistrates Court precinct.
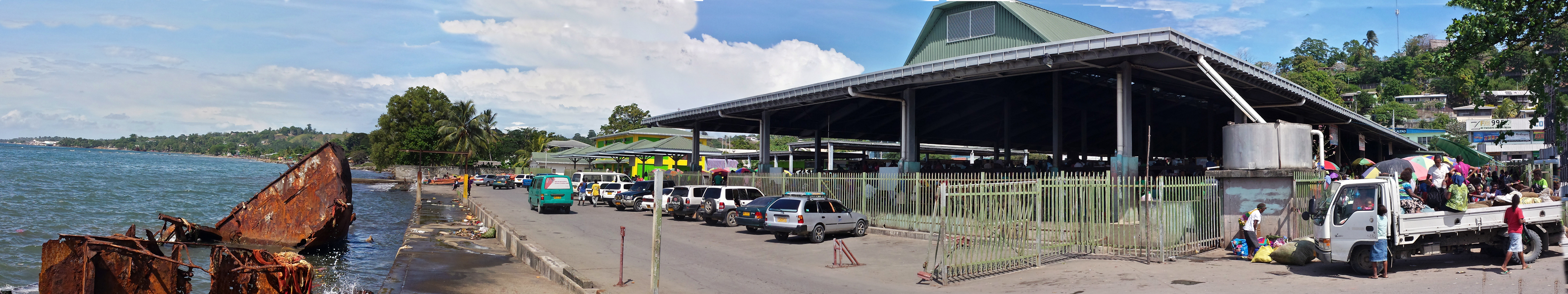
Panoramic photo at rear of Honiara Central Market

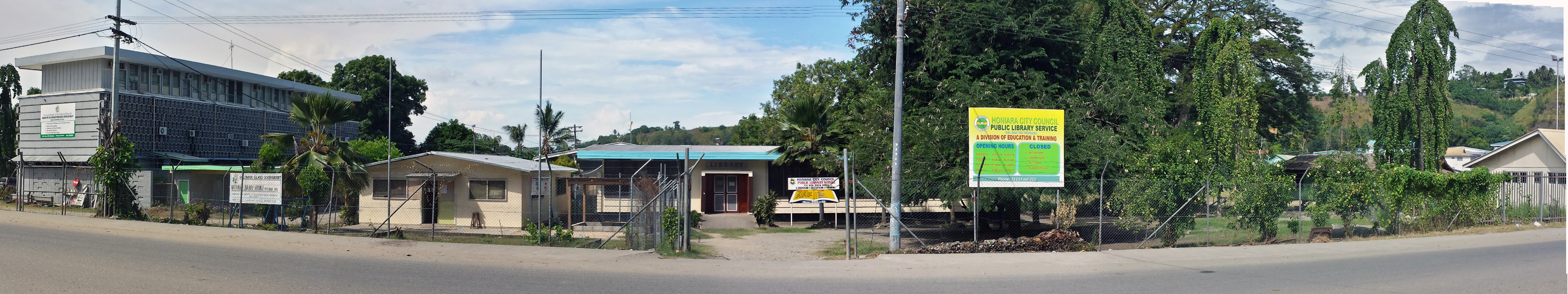
Municipal buildings and Library, adjacent to Bobo field
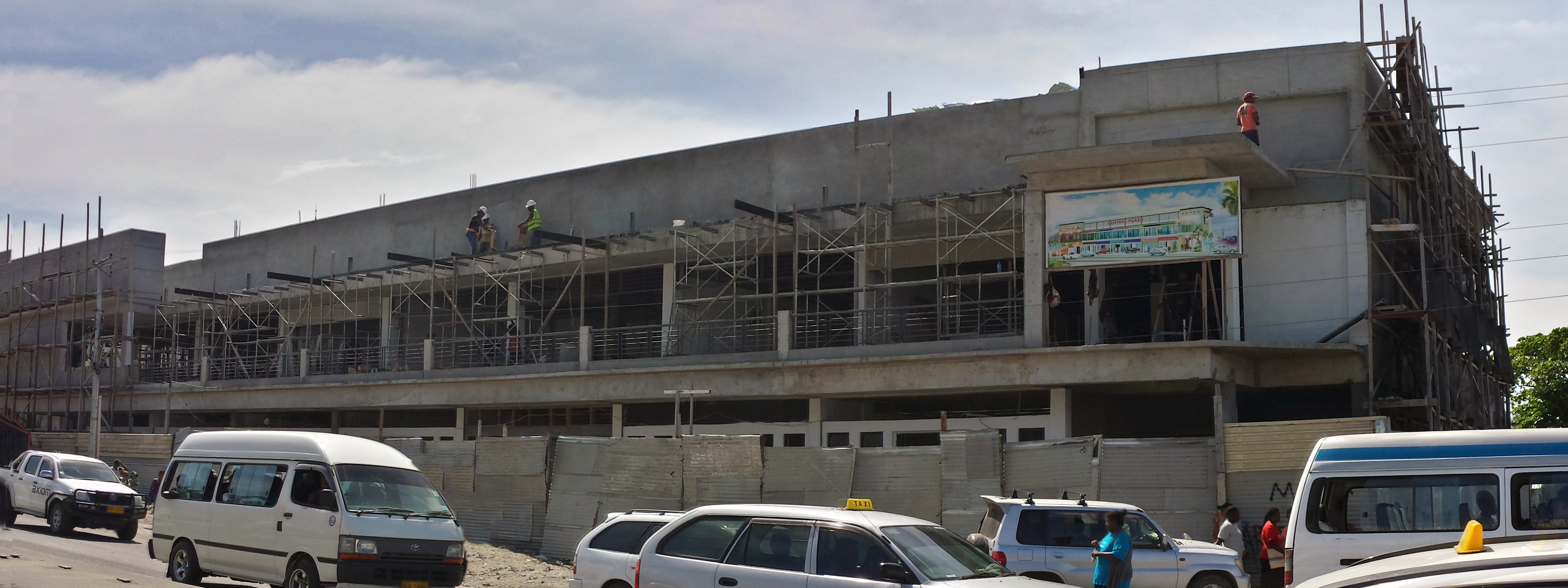
Construction site for new Central Plaza, Mendana Ave, Honiara

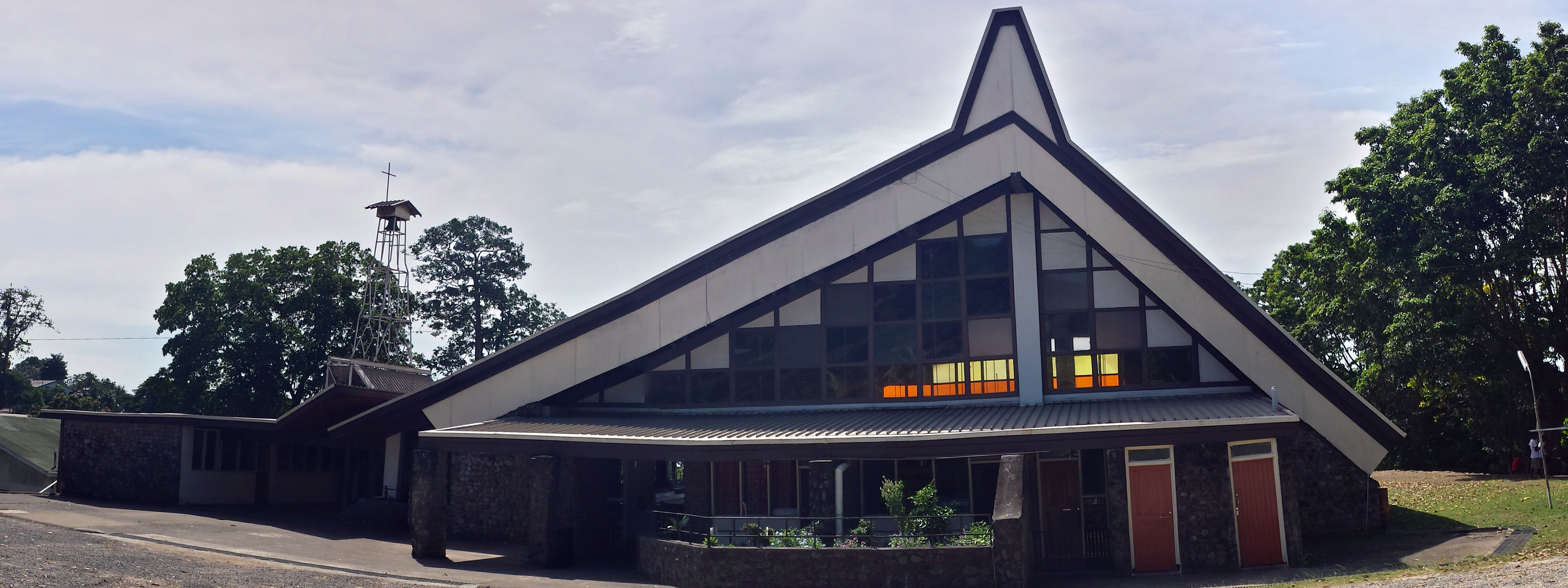
Holy Cross Cathedral, St Mary Catholic. Rear view

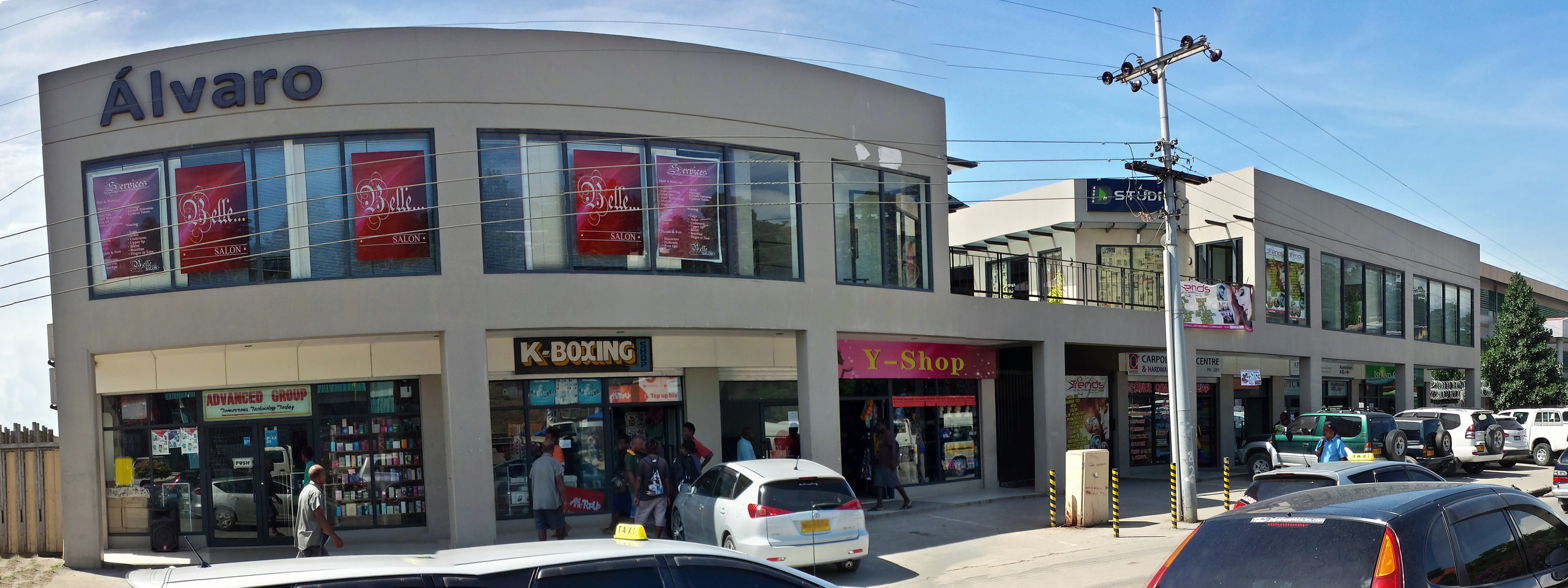
Alvaro building, Mendana Ave, Honiara

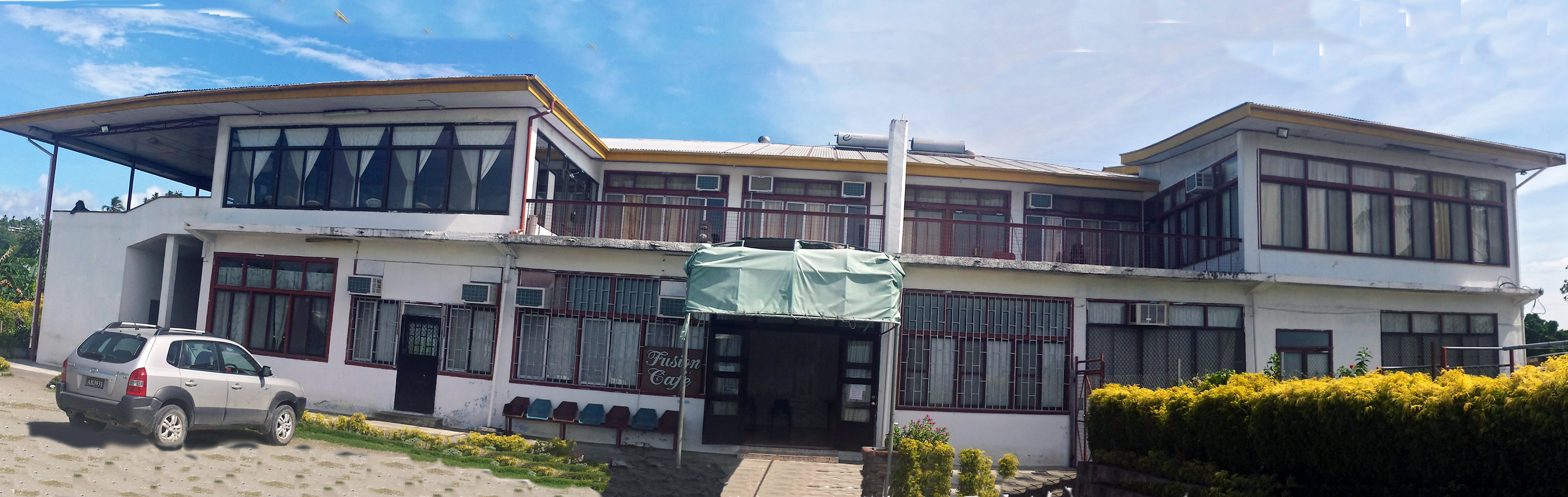
Sea King Chinese Restaurant, Honiara
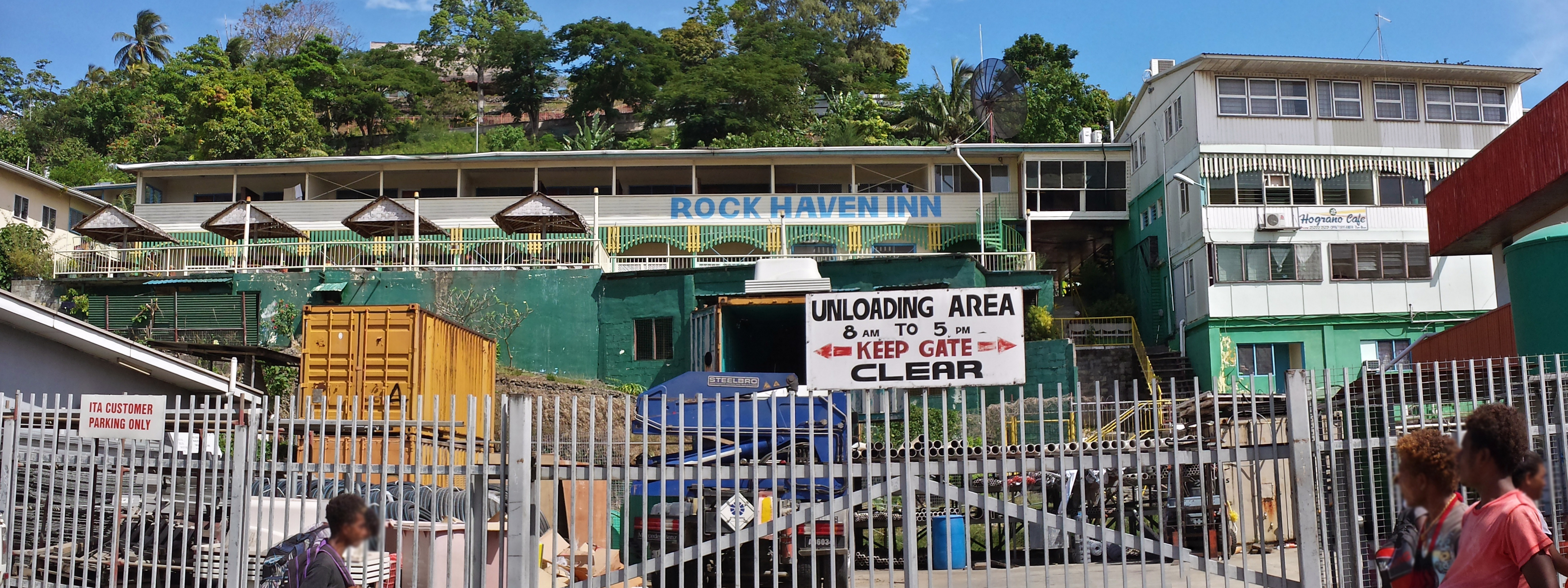
Quality Motel or Rockhaven Inn and Hograno Cafe, Mendana Ave Honiara

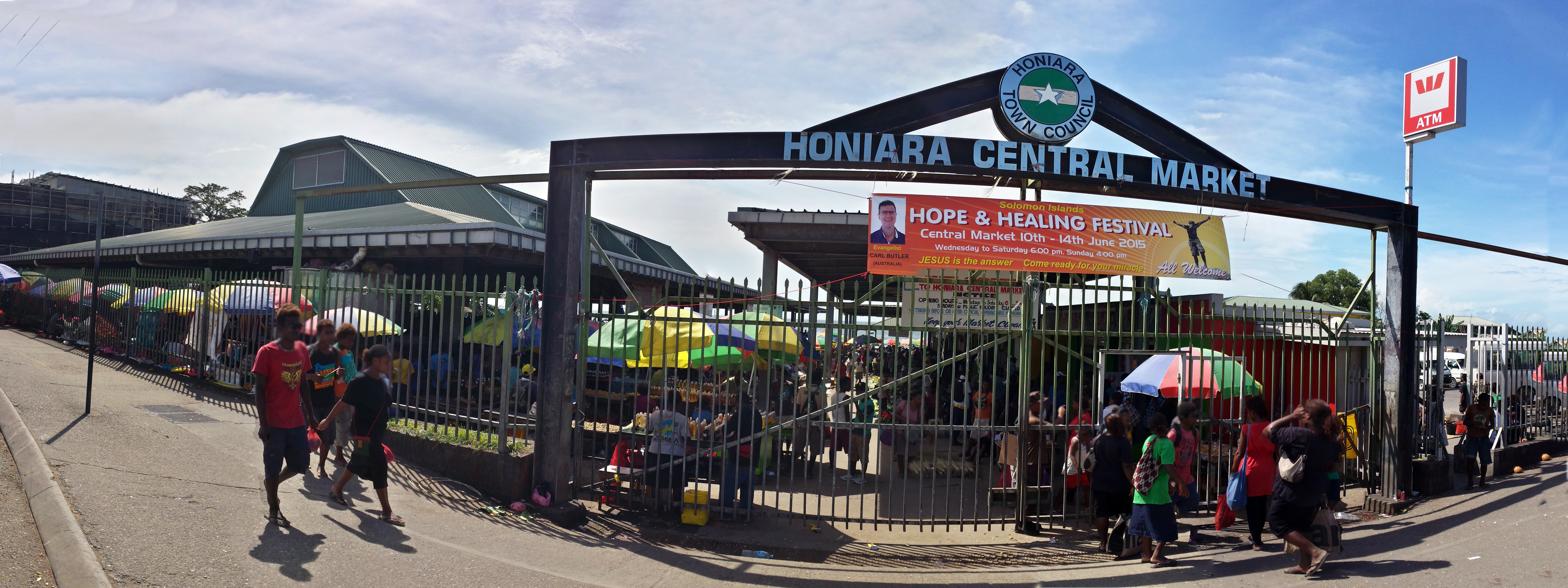
Honiara Central Market, Mendana Ave Honiara

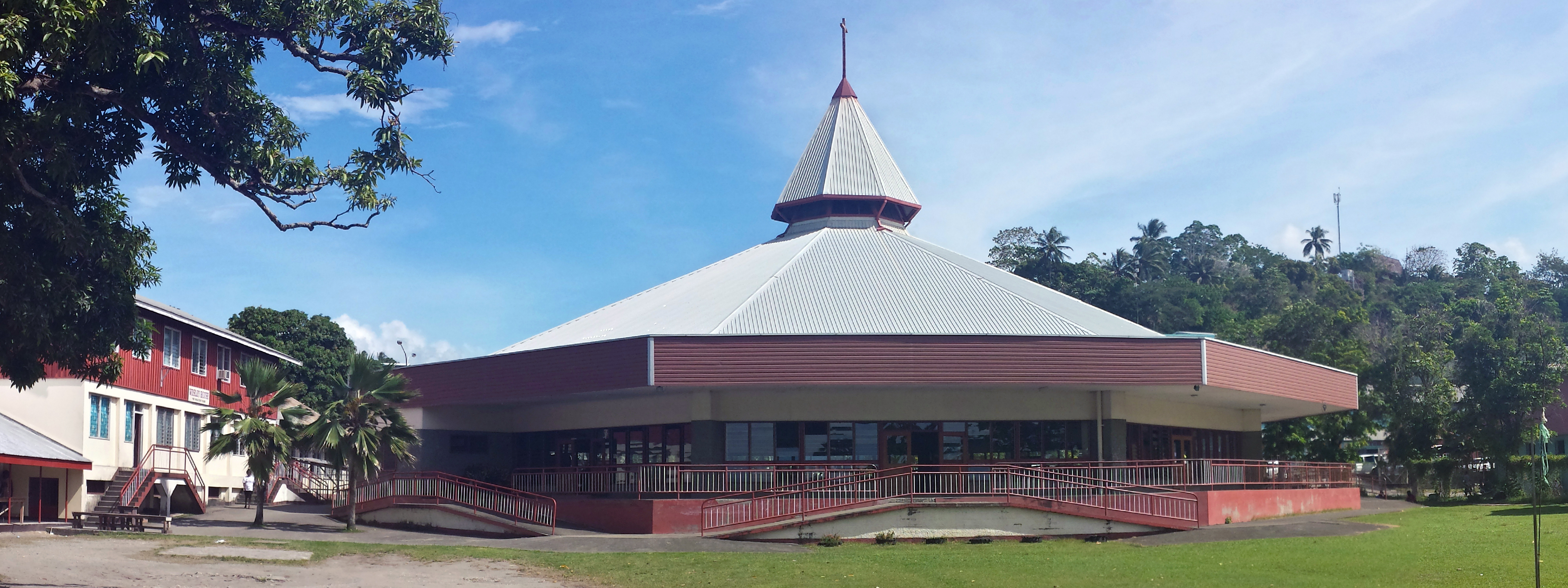
Wesley United Church Mendana Ave, Honiara

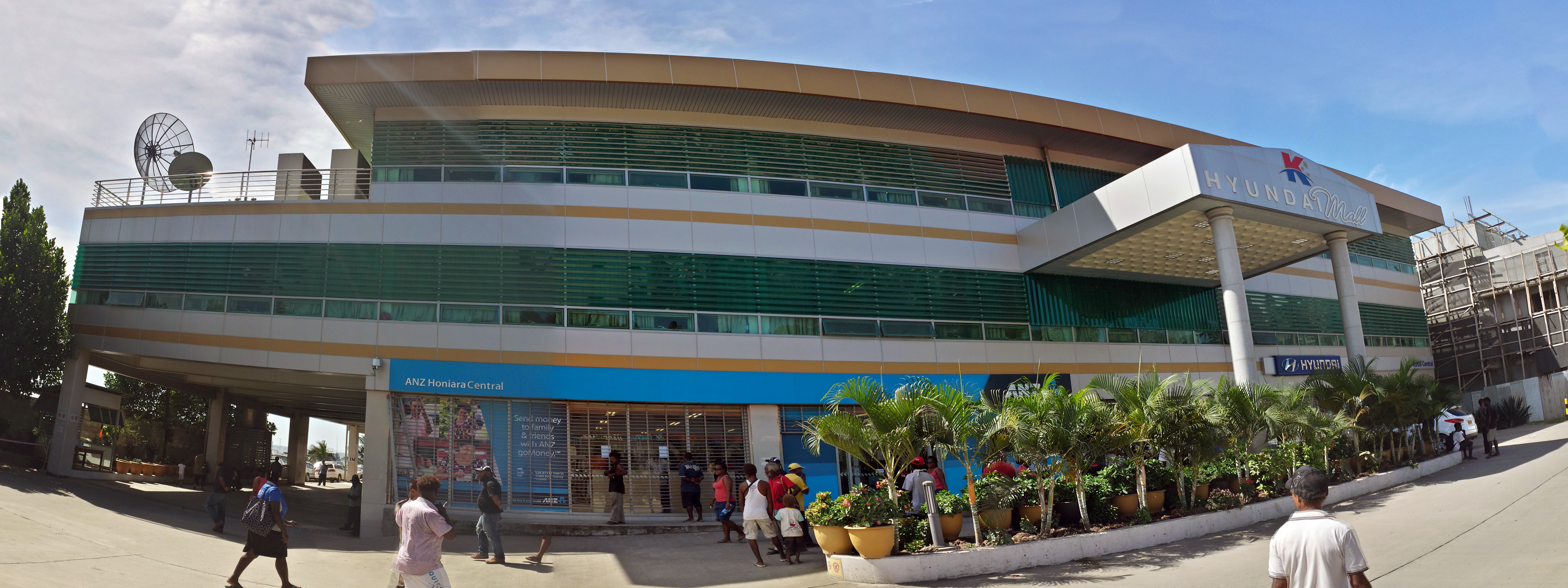
Hyundai Mall Mendana Ave, Honiara
