= Kakabona =

- Suburb
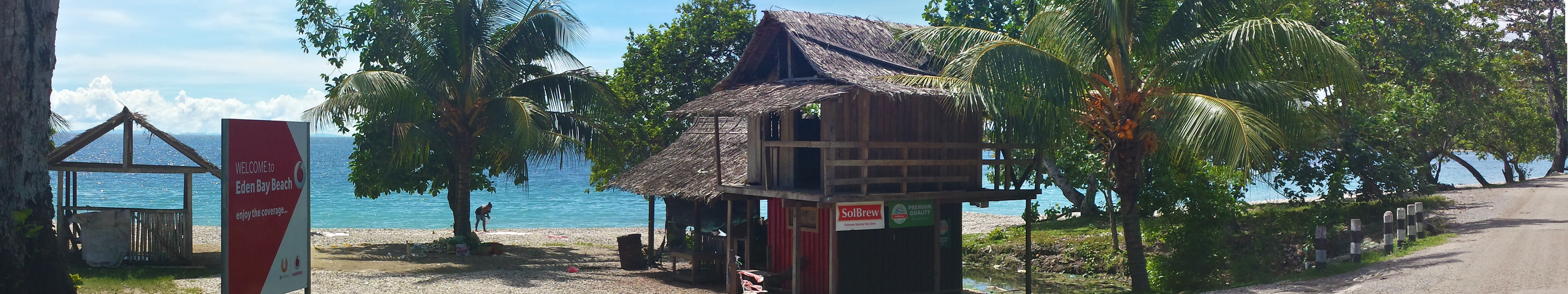
- Eden Bay Beach Panorama at Kakabona

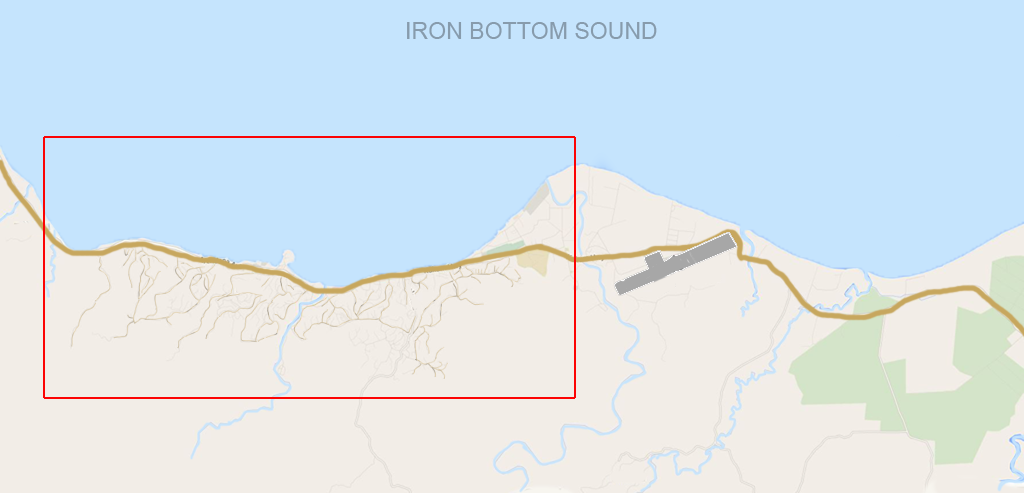
- Location in Honiara (Council boundary-red box)
- Coordinates: 9°25′S 159°54′E
- Country: Solomon Islands
- Province: Honiara Town
- Island: Guadalcanal
- Elevation: 29–100 m (95–328 ft)
- Time zone: UTC+11 (UTC)

Kakabona (Kakambona) is a peri-urban suburb on the fringe of Honiara, Solomon Islands and is located 4 kilometres (2.5 mi) west of the main center and west of White River on the Tandai Highway. Kakabona borders the Honiara City Council ward of Nggosi. Refugees from Bouganville settled following the conflict.

Kakabona is East of Tanaghai and West of White River.

== Tandai/Tadai Highway ==
In 1966, the main coastal road out of Honiara west of Rove Creek as far as Poha River was named Tadai which connected the Mendana Avenue through Honiara and after Mataniko River to Prince Philip Highway.

== Villages ==
- Kolutoha (coastal)
- Mbuadoko (coastal)
- Kovuare (coastal)
- Tanaghai Heights (inland)
- Tanaghai T.C (inland)

== History ==
From 1870 West Guadalcanal was visited by labour recruiters for the sugar plantations of Queensland followed by missionaries and colonial officials. The blackbirding practice ended with the passage of the Pacific Island Labourers Act in 1901 resulting in Pacific Islanders being repatriated and those from Solomon Islands were offloaded in the main anchorages in West Guadalcanal.

During World War 2, the United States Marine Corps base was located in Tanaghai at the site of the mission station.

In 1946 patterns of normality returned to West Guadalcanal following the defeat of the Japanese. A road from Honiara central to the west was constructed. The first vehicle, an American jeep owned by a Chinese trader was acquired in 1950 by a Kakabona man.

During the tension period of 1998, many displaced Malaitans refugees flowed from Visale, Aruligo, and Kakabona towards Honiara. Ceasefire negotiations in 2000 were attempted at Tanavasa Bridge, Kakabona but during the process two persons were killed and both parties resumed defence modes. Following the peace deal a weapons handover ceremony was conducted at Kakabona on 14 December 2001. In June 2001 the Guadalcanal Premier Alebua was shot in the head, chest and arm in an assassination attempt at Kakabona by Harold Keke and Joe Sangu.

== Languages ==
- Ghari language
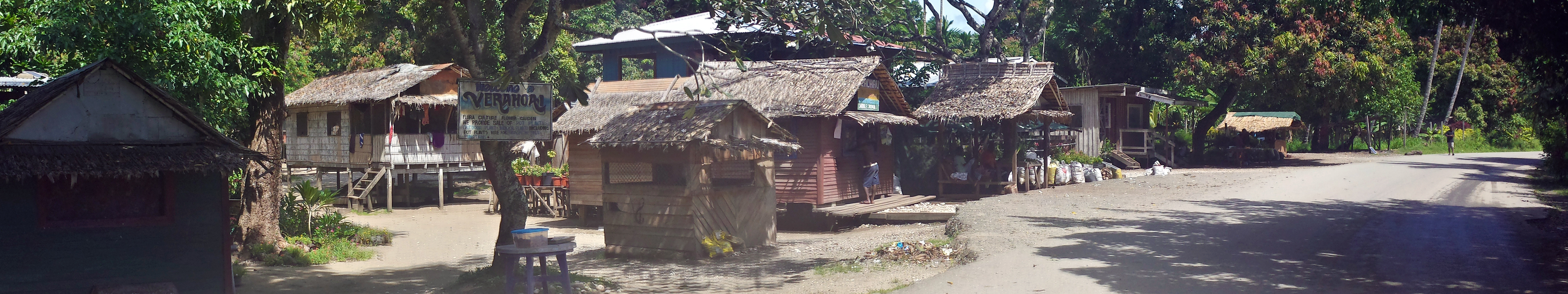
Verahoa showing the Floriculture stalls at Tandai Highway. West of Honiara.

== Industry ==
The main industry for Kakabona is Floricultural and in Honiara consists of two major groups of floricultural value chains. One is associated with growers from Kakabona where more potted plants are grown for sale. The growers generally take their products to the Honiara Municipal Market on Saturdays, the only day operating each week for the flower section. The other is associated with the private Betikama Adventist College.

The other industry is tourism and the main Kakabona Beach is frequented by residents of Honiara and the landowner charges a nominal admission fee.

== Education ==
- St. Mary's Primary & Secondary Schools, Tanagai Parish

St. Mary's Tanaghi Community School was established in the 1960s. The school was established and administered by the Roman Catholic Church Education
Authority with supervision from the „Marist Brothers Society‟ from Australia to cater for the increasing primary needs of the residents in and around the Kakabona area, right down to Visale. In 1984, the school was transferred from the Catholic Education Authority to the Guadalcanal Province Education Authority, which continued to administer the running of the school until today. The school was later extended to accommodate students at the secondary level. On 16 January 2003, under the name St. Mary Tanagai Community High School, or Marara Community High School as is sometimes called, the school enrolled its first ::new intake of secondary school students within the area. Marara school was partially built under the Government of Japan's Grassroots Assistance and Human Security Program.
The Ministry of Education and Human Resources Development has conducted a literacy training for Guadalcanal province teachers at Marara Community High School as a follow-up after results from the Solomon ::Islands Standardised Test of Achievements(SISTA) in the past years have been examined.

== Churches ==
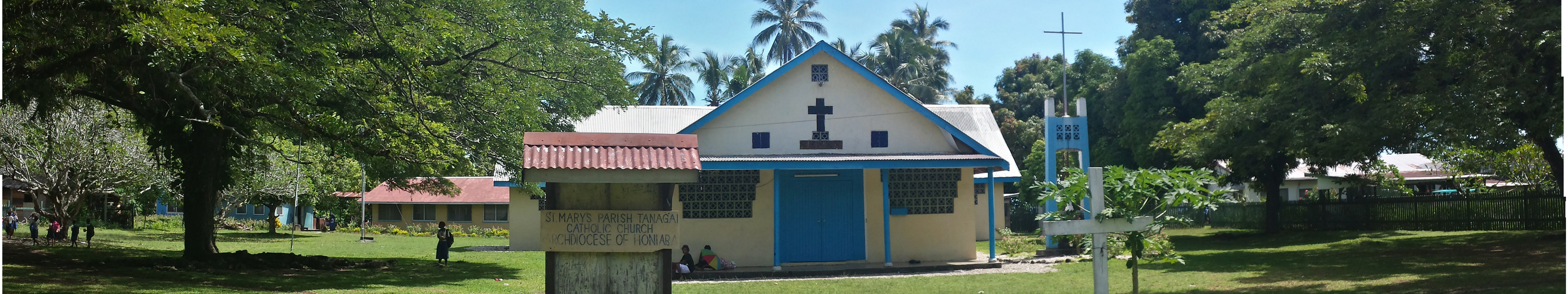
St. Marys Parish in Tanagai

Laracy (1976, 11) in states that the Spanish expeditions to the Solomons in 1568, 1595 and 1605 were for exploration, colonisation and spreading the gospel. The French Marists first reached the Solomon Islands on 2 December 1845, led by Bishop Epalle and later formed the Melanesia and Micronesia district of Marists under Bishop Epalle with headquarters at Makira until the death of Bishop Epalle where attempts were abandoned. Catholic missionaries returned to the Solomons in 1898 when Bishop Julian Vidal landed at Tulagi settling on small Rua Sura Island off Aola Bay, Guadalcanal. Land was purchased at Tangarare in South Guadalcanal in May 1898 and two priests were installed in June 1900. According to Raucaz (1928) As early as 1904, the big village of Kakabona received the faith and a chapel was built.

In North West Guadalcanal, at Vaturanga and Visalemore land was purchased close to the Anglican missions. Rivalry continued between the French Marists and the Anglicans and in 1910 a Catholic church stone building was built at Visale being the only stone structure in Solomons at the time. In 1923, Visale replaced Rua Sura as the Marist headquarters. The substantial Visale Cathedral was destroyed in a severe earthquake on 25 January 1925 and later rebuilt in 1930. French was the common language with missionaries and texts were printed in Ghari language but later the lingua franca was changed to Pijin English. By 1918 there were 3000 Catholic conversions on Guadalcanal. As a result of World War 2 the missions from Visale moved back to Tangarare due to safety reasons and then were evacuated by the Americans to Caledonia as the Japanese believed Marists were collaborating with the allies. After World War 2 the Bishop relocated to Kakabona using a small leaf chapel and later a Quonset hut. The remains of the Visale printing press were brought to Kakabona, where the Bishop made his headquarters at Tanagai. In 1946 twenty Marist students were sent to Fiji to study to become Marist brothers. in

Bishop Aubin (1934–1949) from his new headquarters at Tanagai Mission Station (Visale was in ruins) purchased the hill of Vatuliva from the Town Council in 1947. The hill located in Vuhokesa is the site of the Holy Cross Cathedral St Marys. It was written that Mendana erected a cross and a chapel on the hill.

In December 1966, Pope Paul VI established a new ecclesiastical hierarchy for Papua New Guinea and the Solomon Islands. The Vicar Apostolic of the South Solomons, Daniel W. Stuyvenberg (q.v.), was styled Bishop of Honiara, and Gizo Diocese was under Irishman Bishop Eusebius Crawford. Both were to be suffragans of the Metropolitan See of Rabaul. Dominicans ran the Gizo-based diocese, and Marists the Honiara-based diocese. In recognition that the Marists lacked the capacity to serve all of the Solomons, but the war halted progress and it was not until January 1956 that Dominican priests, friars and sisters set out from Australia to Gizo. They purchased Loga, an old Lever Brothers plantation a short canoe trip from Gizo, and set to work. They also purchased a Mission ship, the Salve Regina. In 1959, the Western District became an apostolic vicariate in its own right under Bishop Crawford. (O'Brien 1995, 157–170)

- St. Mary's Parish Catholic Church, Tanagai

== Entertainment ==
Kovuare Nightclub (Kaovare) was established in 1996 by Charles Keku a part Guadalcanal and part Malaitan, as a way of indigenous Solomon Islanders to participate in untouched economic activities such as night clubs.

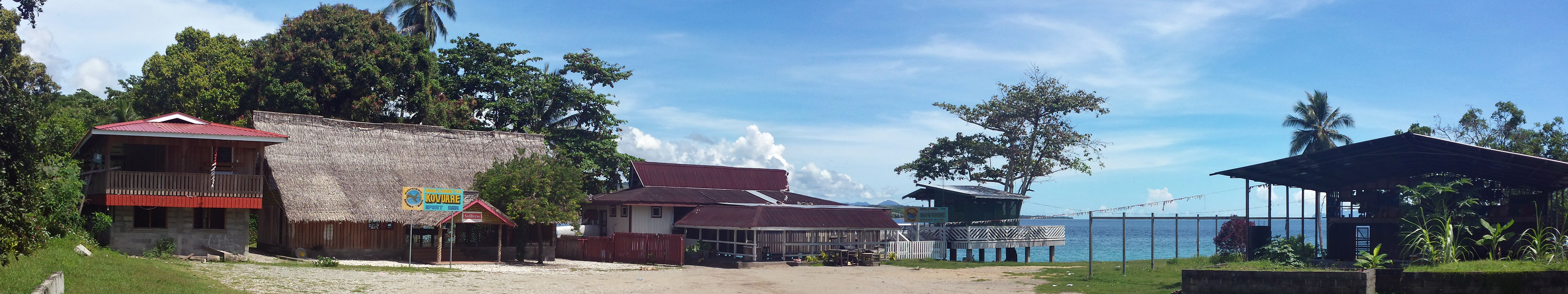
Kovuare Nightclub facing North, West of Honiara.

== Notable people ==
- William Bennett MBE (13 January 1920 - 1988) assisted coastwatcher Donald J. Kennedy, and served at Seghe, New Georgia. He was awarded the Military Medal in 1945. He set up Solomon Islands Broadcasting Corporation.
- Br. Andrew Ayliffe SM (1916 - July 2010) In 1938 he traveled with Bishop Aubin and worked for two years in the Solomon Islands as a lay missionary where in 1946, he built the church at Tanagai, 1947, built classroom at Tenaru; 1947–51, completing the mission station at Terapaina; 1982, built the presbytery at Dala; 1953, sawmill and workshop, Buma; 1954, whole station for Sisters and priest, Avuavu; 1955-ca 72, Tanagai printery; 1973 Kesao Boys Centre, Visale; 1974, in Australia for health reasons. Tutu, Fiji: 1975–2005, novitiate and brothers' training staff; 2005–10, Home of Compassion, Suva.
- Frank Haikiu (from Bellona) Frank Haikiu is one of the best known carvers in the Pacific and has traveled all over the world with art exhibitions and workshops. He was at the primary school here in St. Mary's Tanagai though not a catholic. His brother is an Anglican priest here. His works include:carvings in the Holy Cross Cathedral, big cross suspended over the altar, the altar, the Stations of the Cross, Mary, Joseph, Christ Suffering, in the chapel at St Joseph's Secondary Tenaru and most recently the altar in our Marist Chapel in the Marist Community in Tanagai.
Panoramic photos of Kakabona
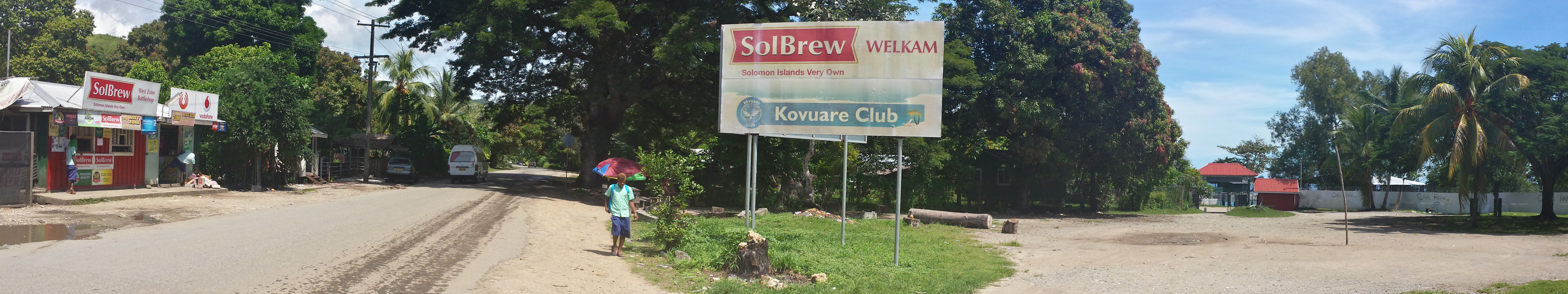
Entrance to Kovuare Club on Tandai Hwy. Facing West

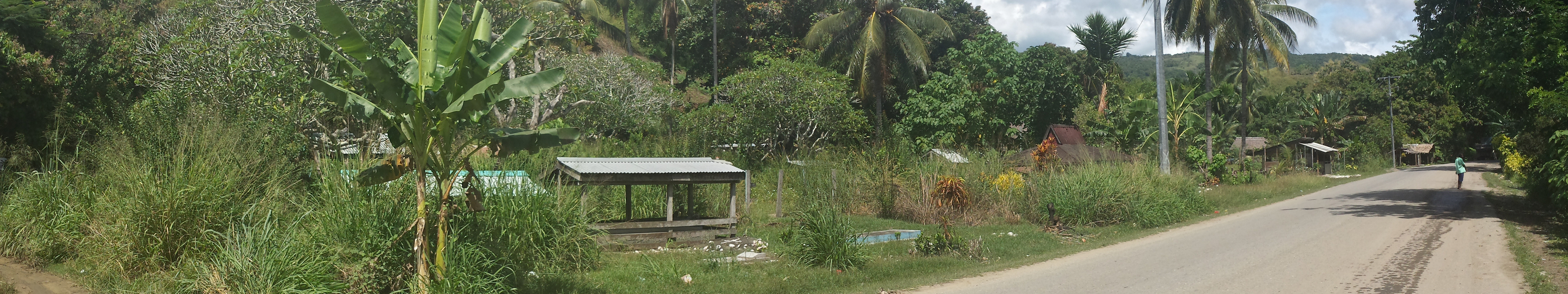
Kakabona Cemetery on Tandai Hwy facing North, West of Honiara

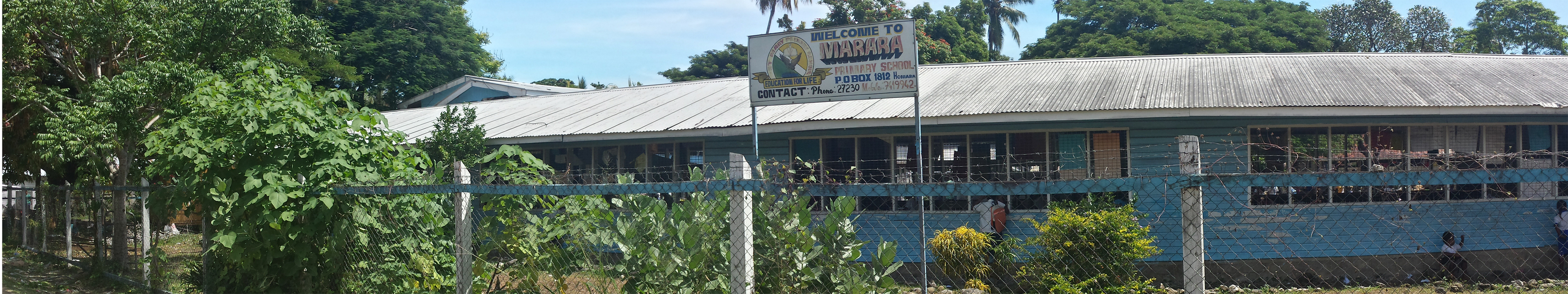
Marara Primary School Tanagai, Kakabona

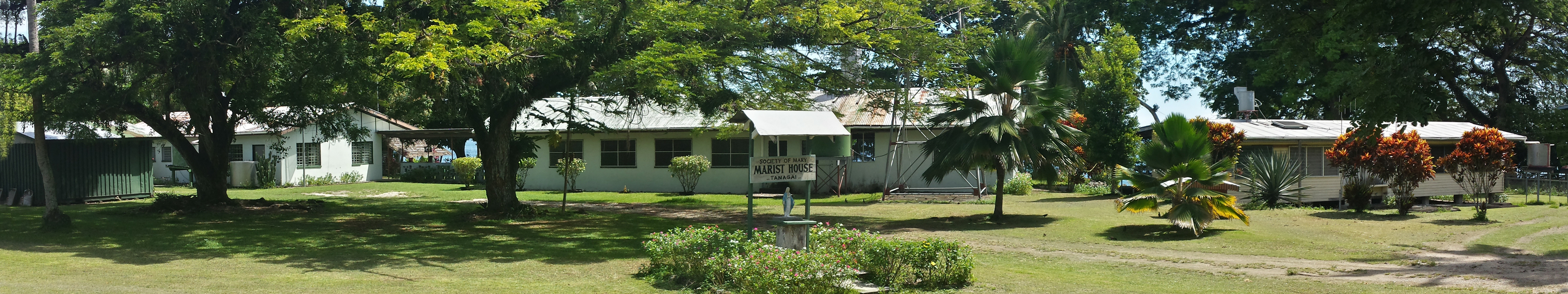
Society of Mary Marist House, Tanagai, Kakabona

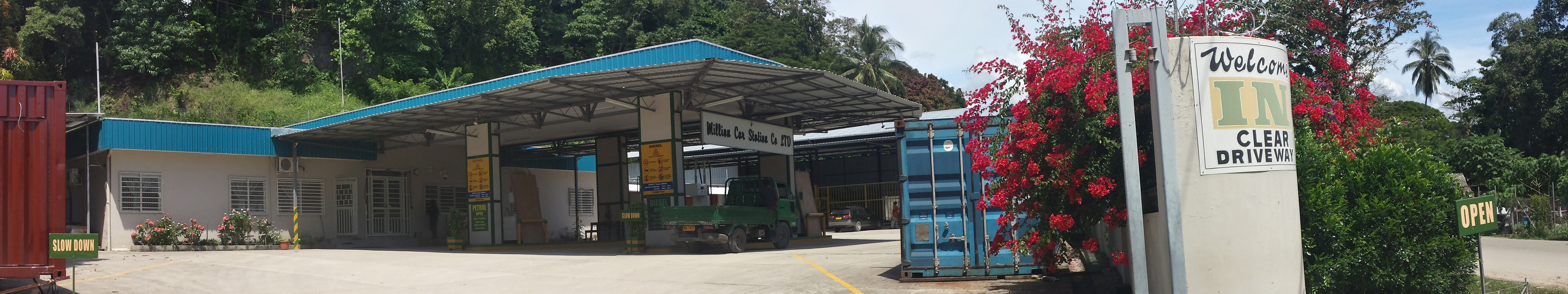
Million Car Station Co Service Station, Tanagai, Kakabona

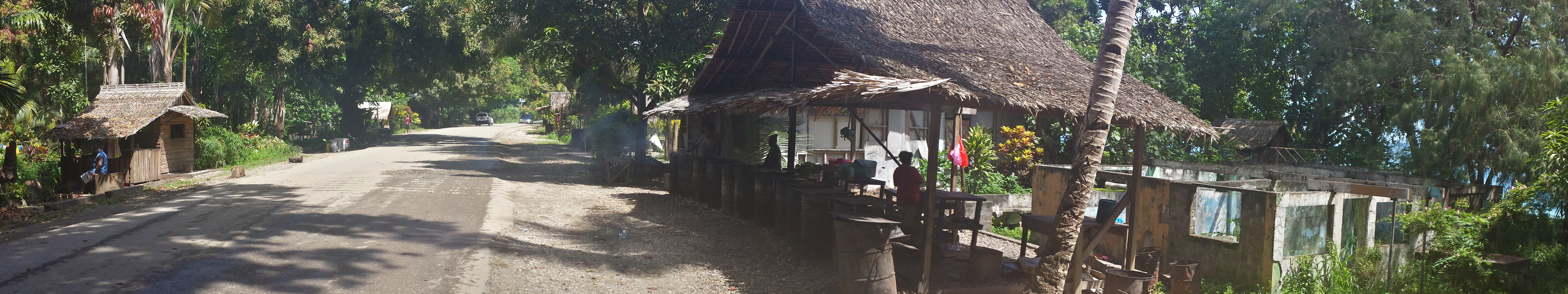
Hot food stall cooking sausages. House ruins (R) from tension era arson

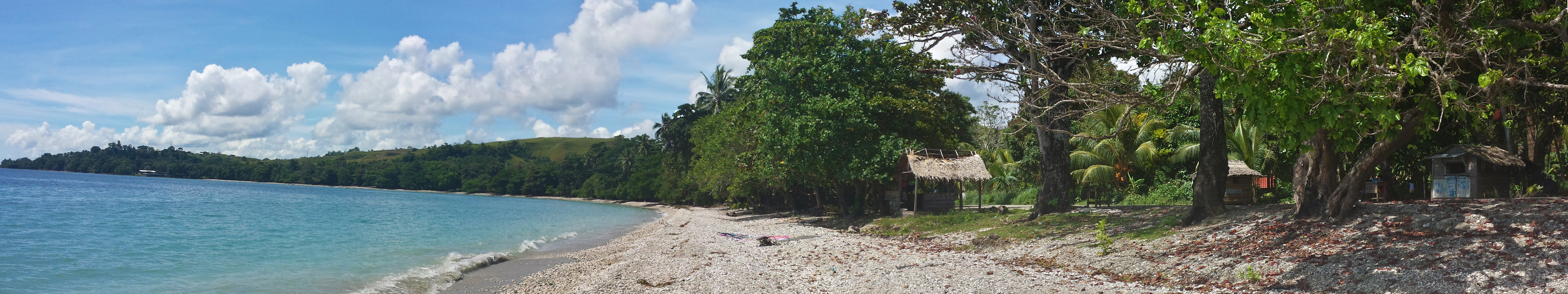
Panorama of Kakabona Beach
