= White River, Honiara =

White River
- Suburb
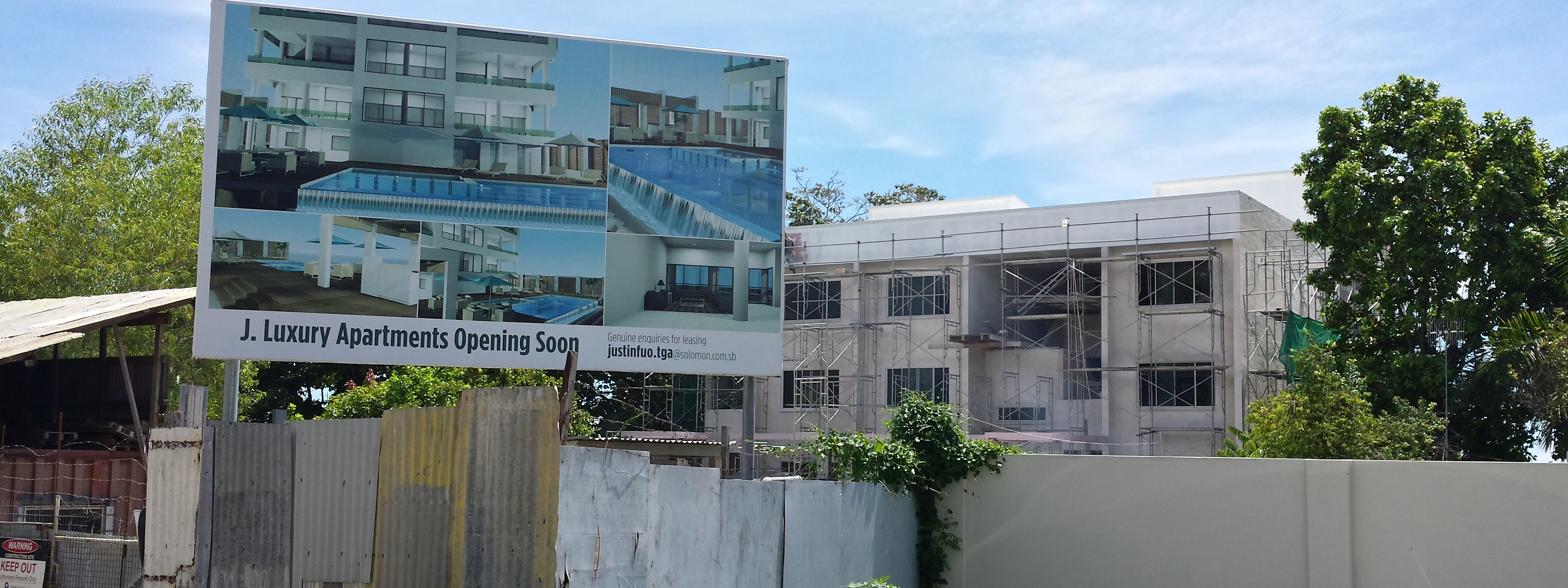
- Redevelopments in White River

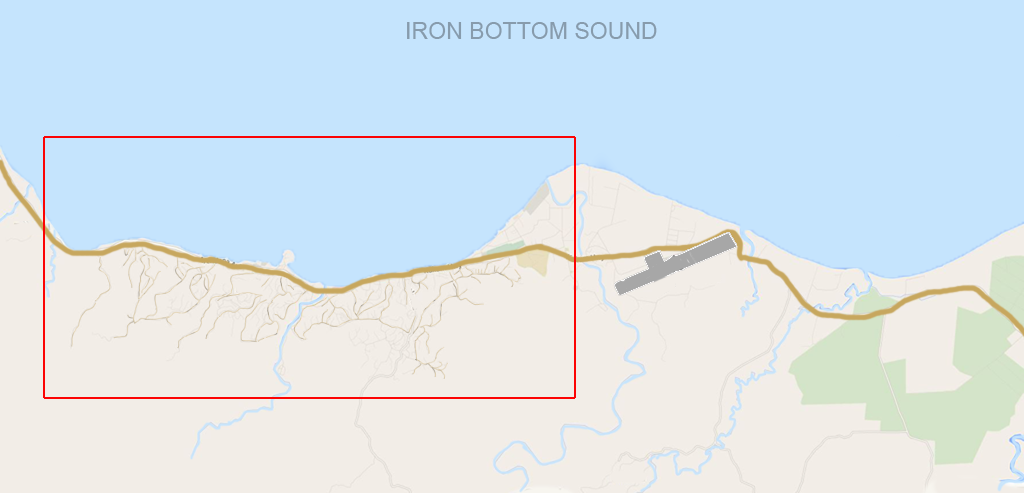
- Location in Honiara (Council boundary-red box)
- Coordinates: 9°26′S 159°55′E
- Country: Solomon Islands
- Province: Honiara Town
- Island: Guadalcanal
- Elevation: 30–100 m (98–328 ft)

Population
  - Total: 4,000
- Time zone: UTC+11 (UTC)

White River is a suburb on the fringe of Honiara, Solomon Islands and is located 3 kilometres (1.9 mi) west of the main center on the Tandai Highway. White River is in the Honiara City Council ward of Nggosi. A water spring supplies water to the community.

White River is East of Kakabona and West of Tandai.

== Tandai and Tadai Highway ==
In 1966, the main coastal road out of Honiara west of Rove Creek as far as Poha River was named Tadai which connected the Mendana Avenue through Honiara and after Mataniko River to Prince Philip Highway.

== Villages ==
- Wind Valley
- Independence Valley
- Laundry Valley
- Forest Valley
- Stream Valley
- Banana Valley
- Namoruka
- Karaina Seafront community
- Agape
- Savo Heights (Brissy Hill)
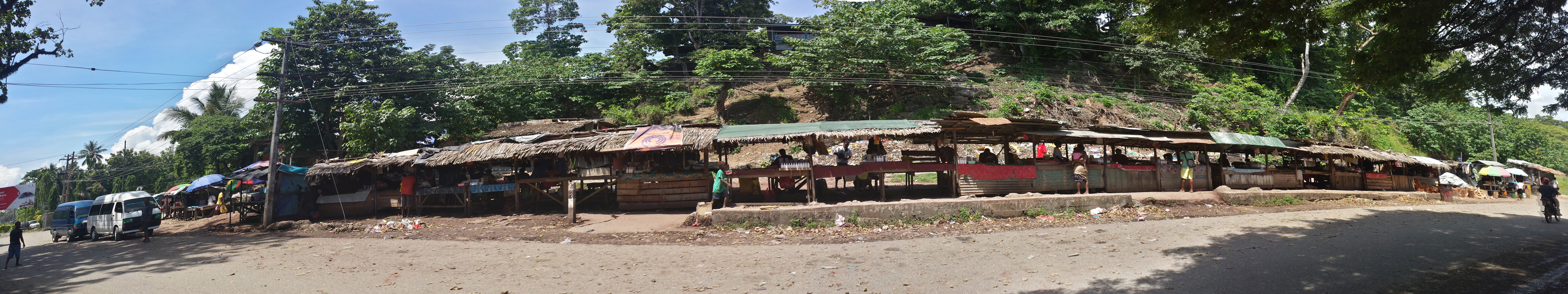
Panorama of White River Markets

== Squatter settlements ==
According to a 2009 study 23% of the White River community are squatter settlements. Tensions surrounding the squatters continue and in 2014 houses in the Independence Valley were burnt down.

Government approved areas were provided in White River where people were allowed to settle providing they had a licence and had to pay rent to the Lands Division usually for a 12-month period at $10.00 per household per year.

== Education ==
- White River High School
- White River Kindergarten
- Kelyn Preschool
- Holau Education Center

== Churches ==
- Roman Catholic parish
- Anglican Church
- Seventh Day Adventist Church
- Apostolic Life Church
- Agape Church
- Solomon Islands Revival Fellowship Church
- The church of Christ of latter-Day saints
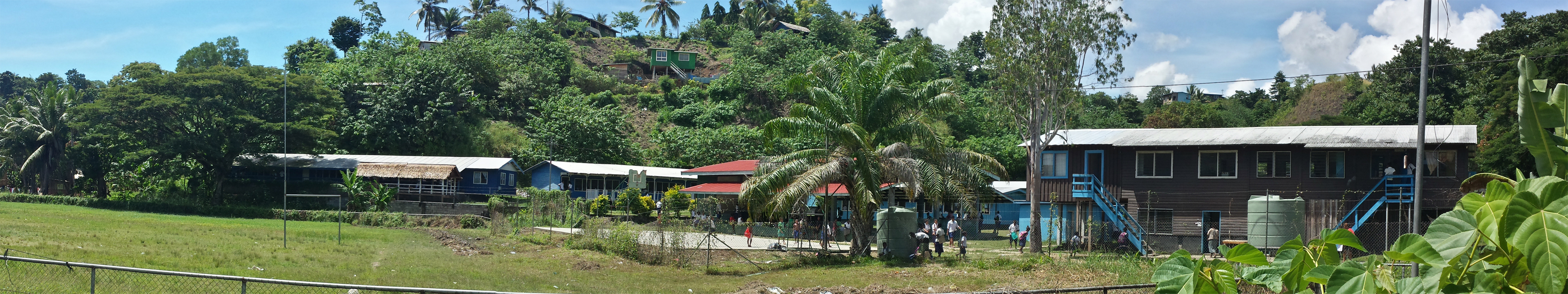
Panorama of White River School

== Culture ==
A dance program held in 1974 at White River recorded 20 dancers taking part in the mu'aabaka

White River is one of Honiara’s most diverse communities, bringing together people from different islands, cultures, races and backgrounds.

Different cultures. One community. Shared aspirations.

- White River SDA choir
- White River children performing Numba Hak
- Litol rasta and solkizs performing at White River
- Tafivaka Tikopian Group
- Vaetea Dancing Group
- Tasalau Cultural Group

== Law and order ==
- White River Police Post

Before the 2006 riots 3,000 Malaitans, mainly youths and young men insulted by graffiti, went in pursuit of Rennell and Bellona settlers in White River. Shops were ransacked and people were injured and forty-five arrests were made, the national Government paid Malaita Province S$200,000 in compensation.

- Coffee With A Cop Initiative (TMC foundation)

- An initiative that brings youth leaders to gehter to have an open dialogue with White River Police Post on issues affecting peace in the community.

- During the 2021 Honiara riots, when much of the city experienced unrest and destruction, West Honiara remained largely peaceful.

It was a reflection of community unity, resilience and people choosing peace.

- During COVID-19, when movement and business activities across Honiara were restricted,White River remained an important place for access to essential goods and services**, with local shops and markets continuing to serve the wider Honiara community.

== 2014 Floods ==
White River was severely affected as a result of the 2014 floods

== Commerce ==
There are several commercial areas in the area, near the Centre there are six or seven shops, and on the main road across from Karaina is one of the largest betel nut markets in Solomon Islands. There are several new Chinese shops near the O1 and O2 bus stops.

The White River market was established in 2001 by the Westside Women for Peace. Women from rural North West Guadalcanal, on the provincial side of White River, would bring fresh vegetables, root crops, fish, and raw meat such as wild pig. Women from Malaita, based in the capital Honiara, would bring non-perishable food items from the stores. On October 11, 2005, notices were served and signed by the government official, instructing the Westside Women for Peace to remove all privately built stalls in the market within five days, to cease market activities on Sundays and to cooperate with government officials on any developments in the area. The White River Markets still operate unlicensed and informal, with marketers targeted by the Honiara City Council for operating without a license.

- Eucheuma Cottonii Seaweed business

== Employment ==
A study reports that 67% of youths at White River state they receive no regular income sources.

== Tourism ==
- Rain Tree Bed and Breakfast
- The Ofis
- White river arts & culture event - 2017
- White River Diverse (Wantok festival) - 2026

== Recording studios ==
The song Bereft of a mother (composer Pu Timoio of Tavi lineage of Kafika) was recorded in 1928 and in 1973 at White River. The composer mourns the death of his mother in a moving reference to the care she took.

- Mountol Sound Studio
- Brekin Records

== Sport ==
- White River Demons AFL football Club
- White River High School rugby
- White River High School Soccer Club
- White River Boxing Club
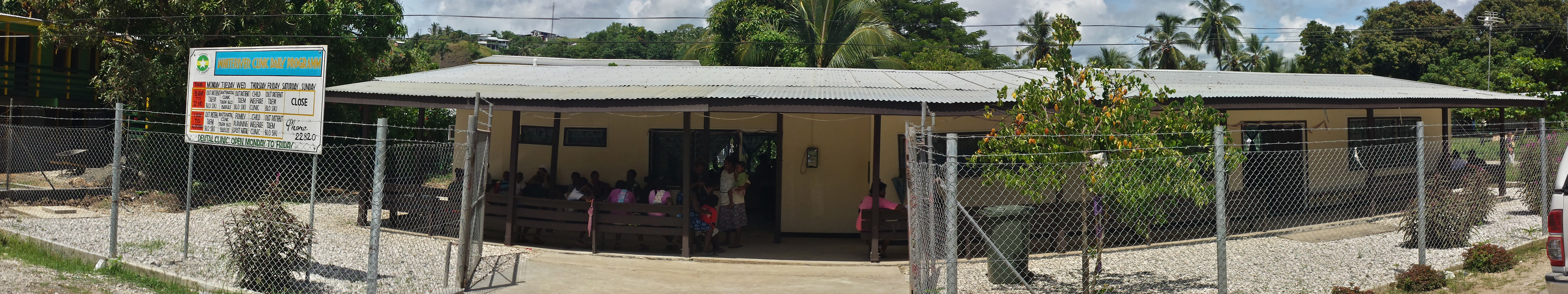
Panorama of White River Health Clinic
- White river Rookies Basketball Team
- West side Bullets Basketball Team
- White River Rainbow Volleyball Team
- West crown Tigers Soccer Club
- Avaiki Rugby Club
- Tia warriors Rugby Club

== Health ==
- White River Health Clinic

== Power station ==
Land has been acquired for the construction of a 33kV White River Substation.

== Languages ==
- Ghari language

== Notable people ==
- Jimmy Nare (artist)
- Sir Waitaben Tabusasi (Senior & former Politician and Speaker of Parliament)
- Judge Ronald Bei Talasasa (High Court Judge & Powerlifting Athlete)
- Jaro Local
- Sean Rii
- Jah Boy
- Sharzy
- Toxie Polyn
Photos of White River
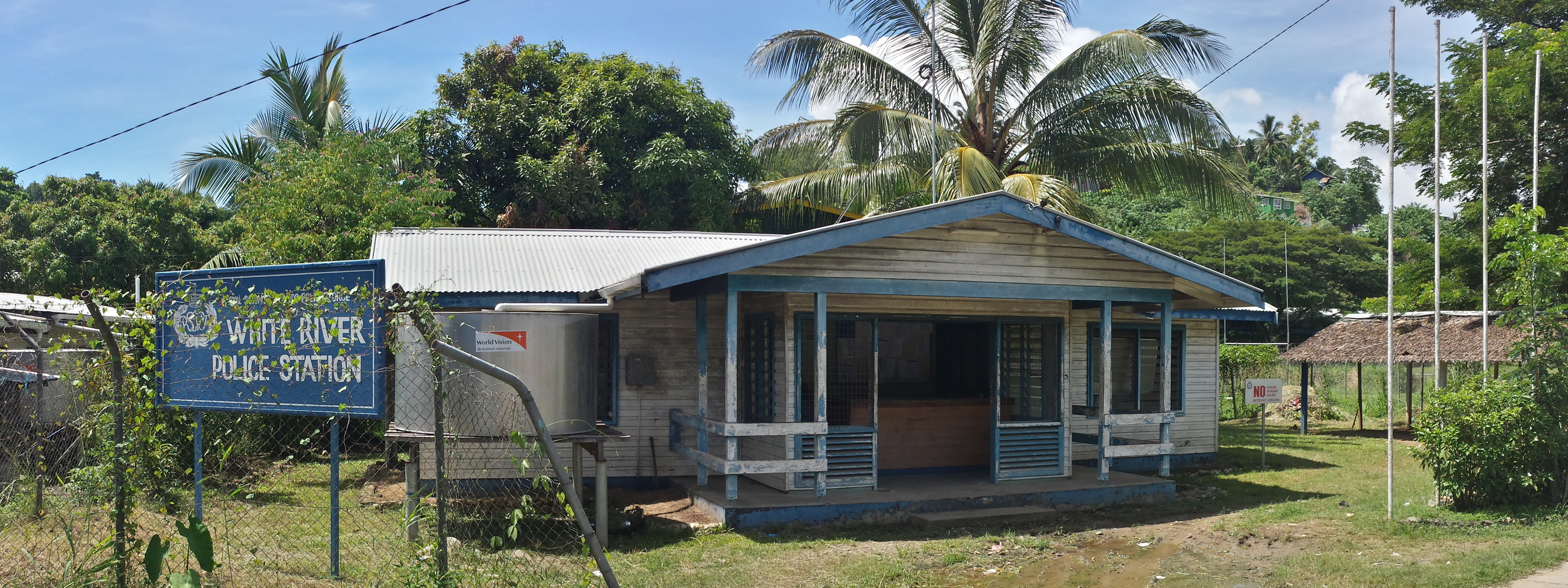
White River Police Station

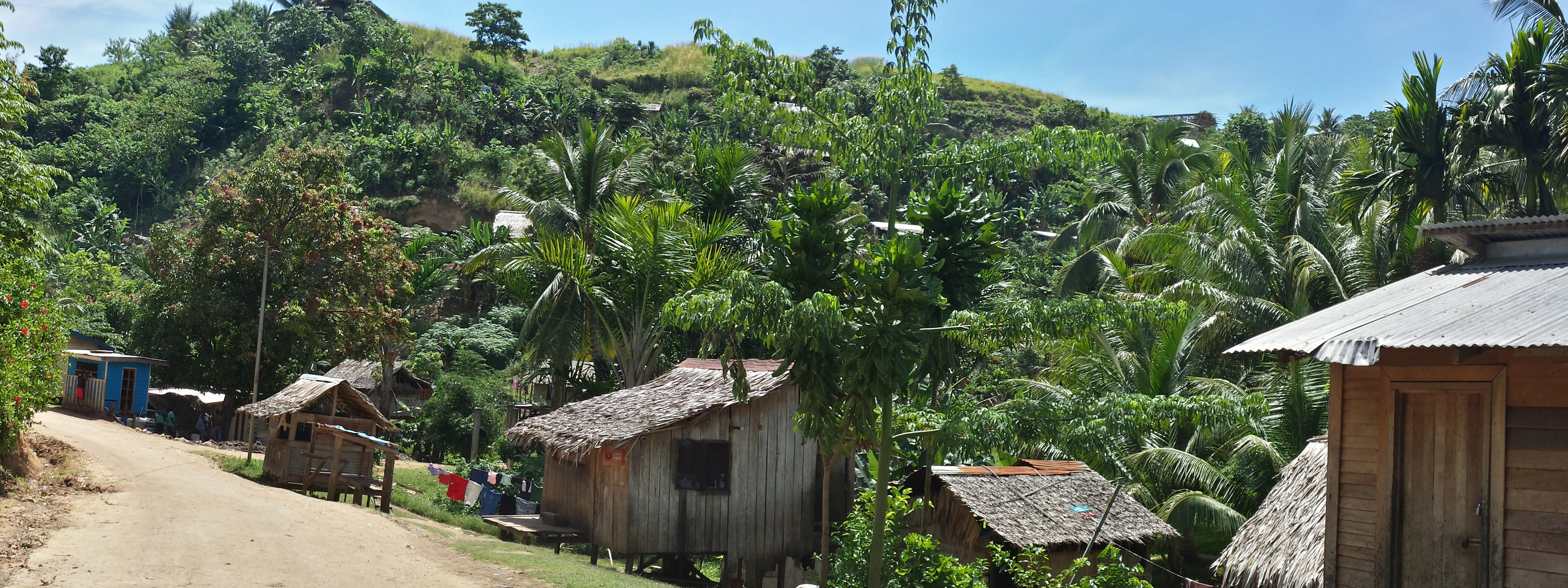
Village on White River Rd facing North

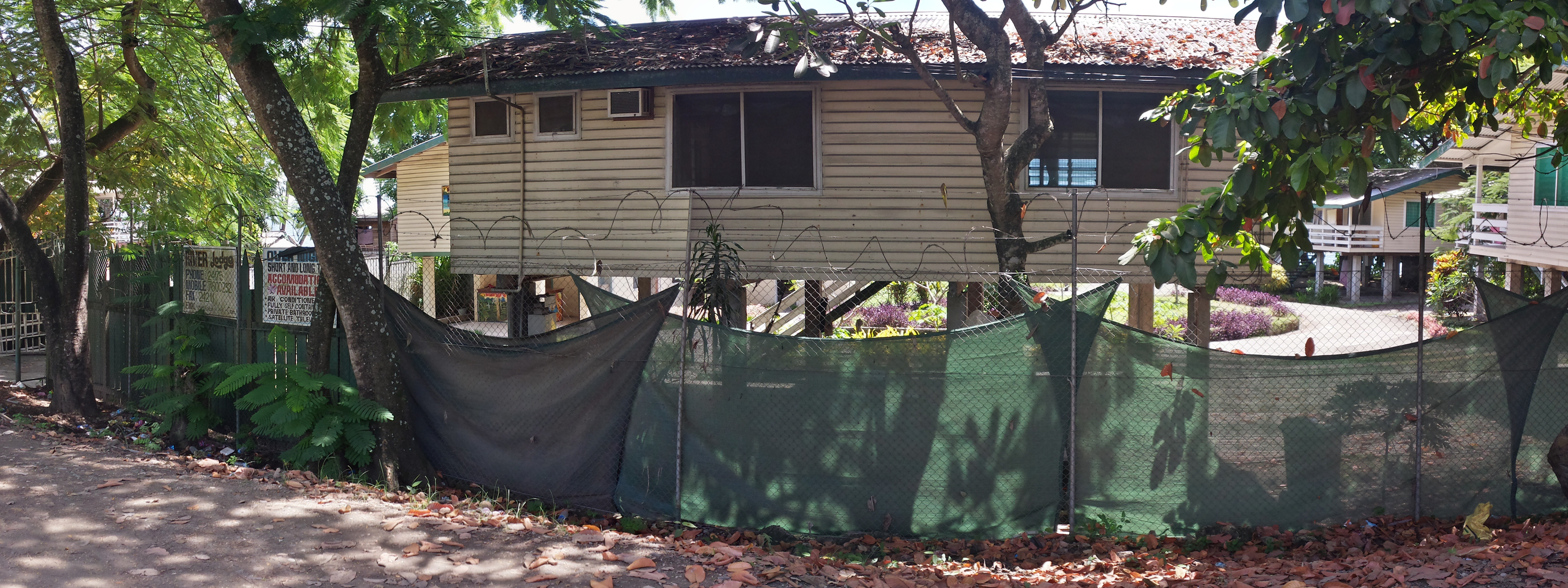
River Lodge on Tandai Hwy, White River facing North

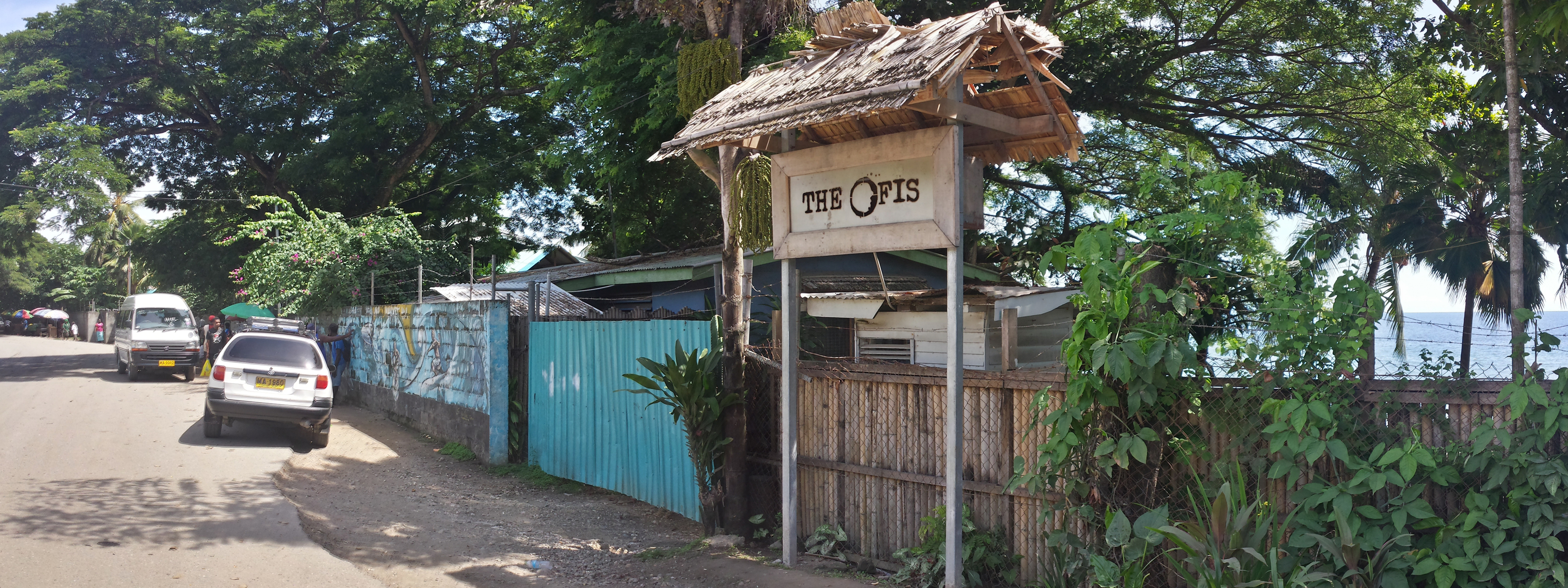
The Ofis bed & breakfast & pizza off Tandai Hwy

== See also ==
- White River Facebook Page
- The Ofis Bed and Breakfast
- The Ofis bed and Breakfast
