= Tandai, Solomon Islands =

Tandai
- Suburb
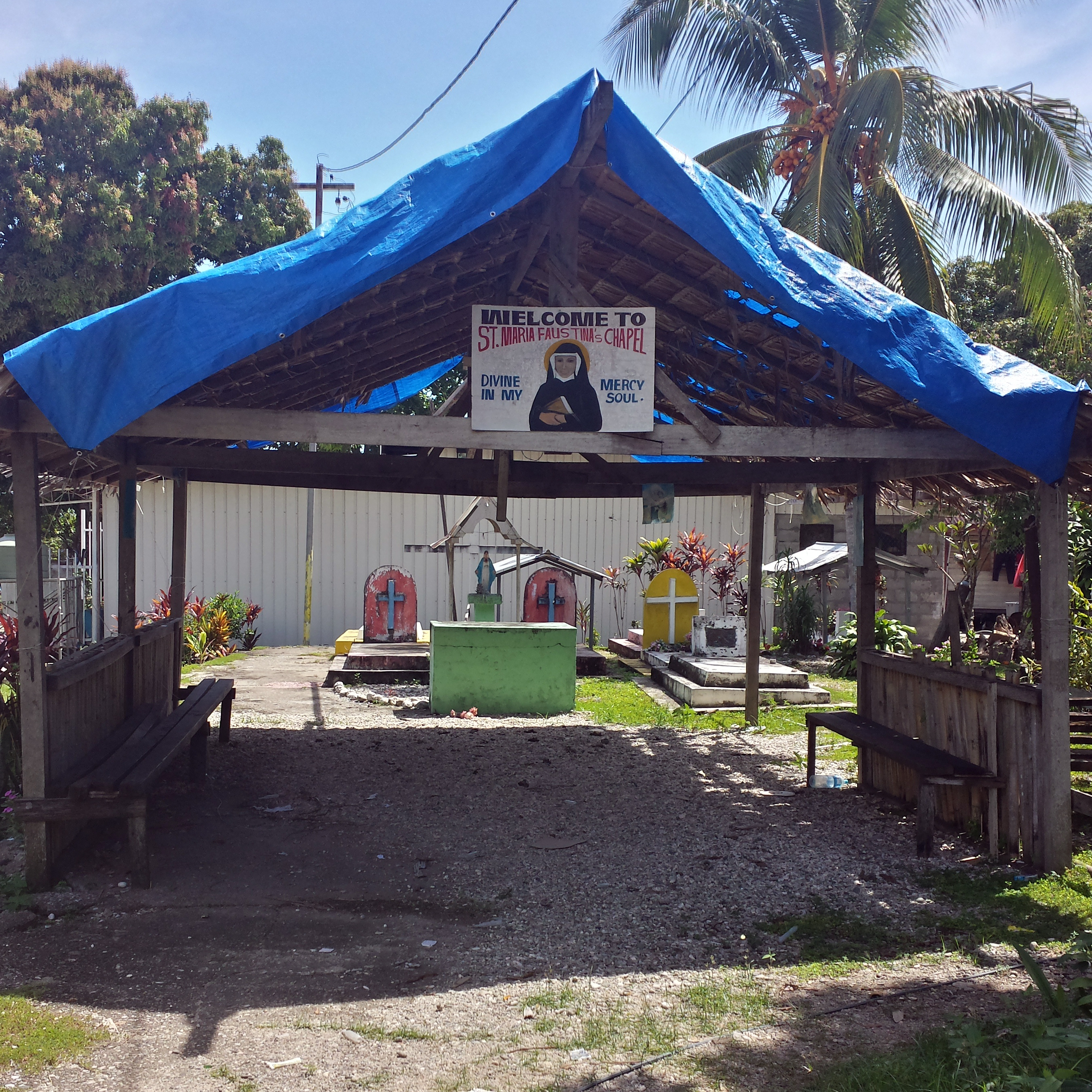
- St. Maria Faus Tina Chapel Tandai. West of Honiara

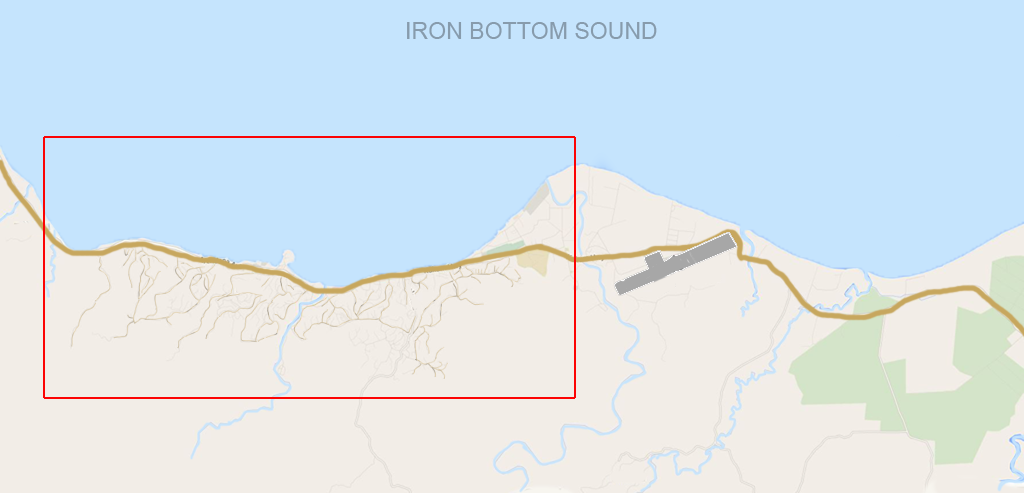
- Location in Honiara (Council boundary-red box)
- Coordinates: 9°27′S 159°57′E
- Country: Solomon Islands
- Province: Honiara Town
- Island: Guadalcanal
- Elevation: 20–100 m (66–328 ft)

Population (2019)
  - Total: 24,592
- Time zone: UTC+11 (UTC)

Tandai is a suburb of Honiara, in the Solomon Islands, located 2 kilometres (1.2 mi) west of the main center on the Tandai Highway. Tandai is in the Honiara City Council ward of Nggosi. Tandai is east of White River and west of Rove.

== RAMSI ==
The former RAMSI headquarters was located at Leilei in Tandai.

== Land disputes ==
On 26 June 2009, the Solomon Islands Parliament passed a private member's motion calling on the government to address land management and administration issues in Honiara, and its surroundings. The motion was moved by Isaac Inoke Tosika, the parliament member for West Honiara. This included providing resources and technical assistance to the Ministry of Lands to address land management issues, such as the need to acquire and subdivide undeveloped Fixed Term Estates in Tandai. The government was also instructed to assist citizens who have had long-term residency on those lands.

Squatter settlements in the Tandai area were caused by people who had settled on government land under temporary occupancy leases, but were evicted after the land was allocated to foreign companies.

Tandai land-owning tribes and the Honiara City Council have engaged in a boundary consultation process to address the illegal expansion of the Honiara City Boundary.

By the end of the twentieth century, much urban growth was taking place in Tandai, causing planning problems related to the provision of services and related issues, and also issues of access to land. These land issues became even more central during the ethnic tension and resulted in the evacuation of some of these areas in this period, although in many cases agreements had been reached with traditional land owners. The urban area of Tandai more than tripled over the 2000s, with an annual growth rate of 7.5 percent as of 2019.

== Churches ==
- Bishop's Dale Church of Melanesia, the Anglican church was the site of election rallies in 2004.
- Assembly of God Christian Life Center, was built in 1986 and is the AoG headquarters for Honiara with an estimated 100 members.

== Villages ==
- Lower Tasahe
- Rifle Range
- Tavioa Ridge

== Tourism ==
- Tropicana Motel
- Tandai motel

== Oxfam ==
The Oxfam building is located in Tandai, which works to strengthen the community.

== Utilities ==
The Tangai area has a low proportions of households with piped water, although efforts are underway to extend this supply.

Photos of Tandai
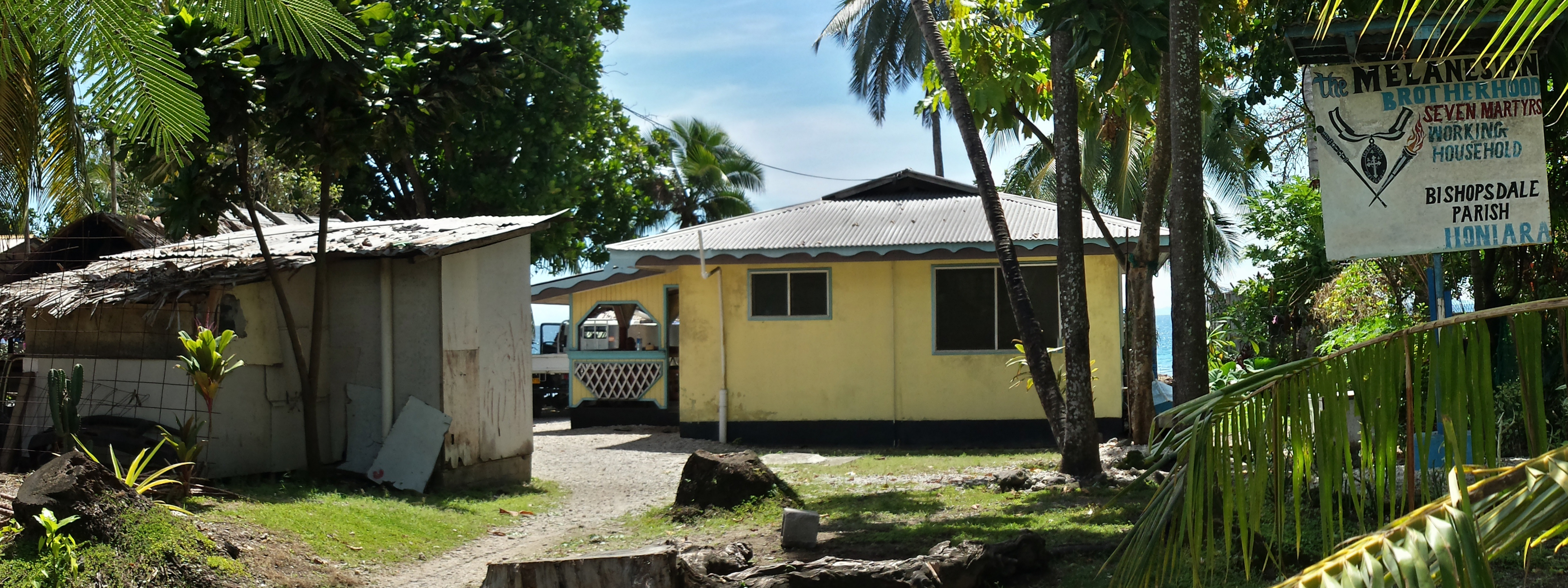
Bishops Dale church

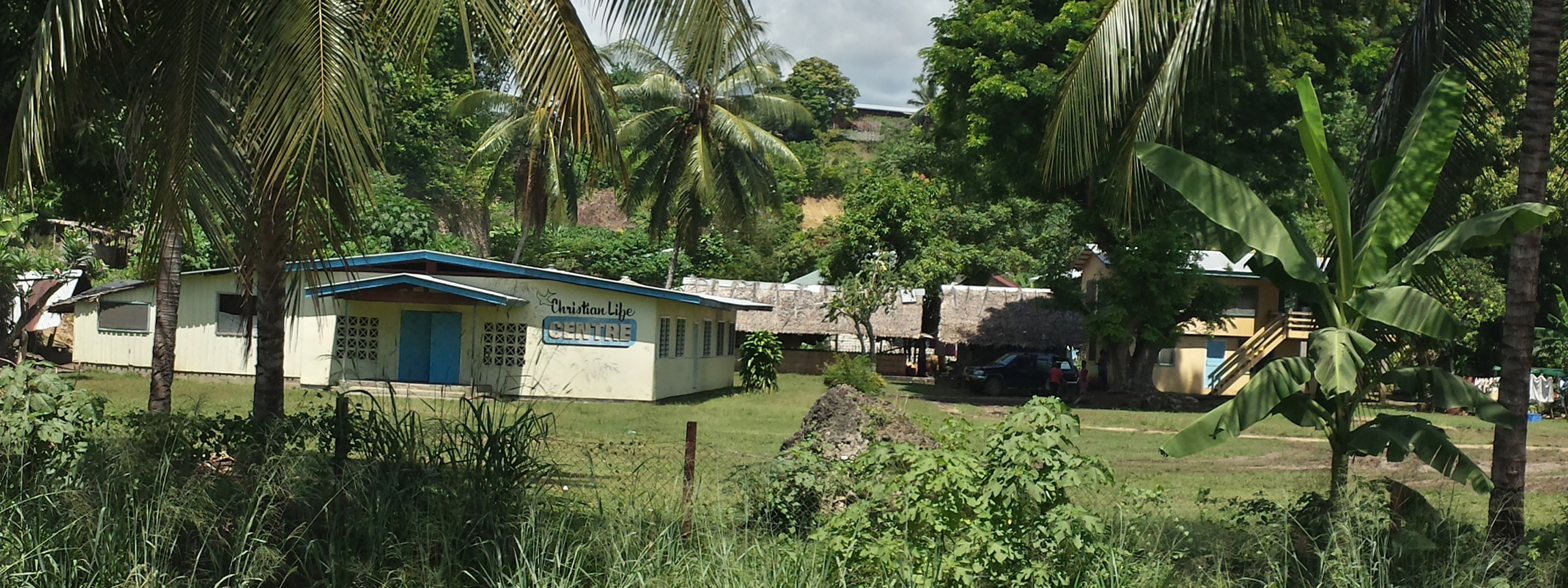
Tandai Christian Life Center

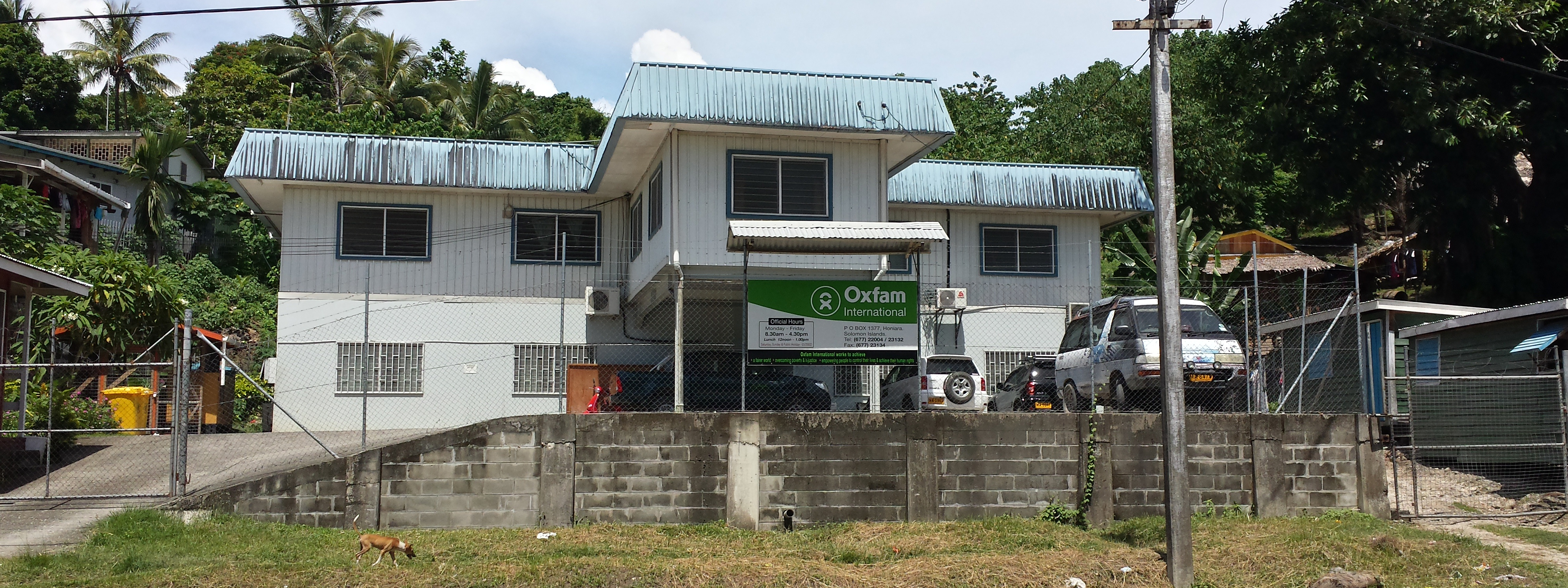
Oxfam building in Tandai

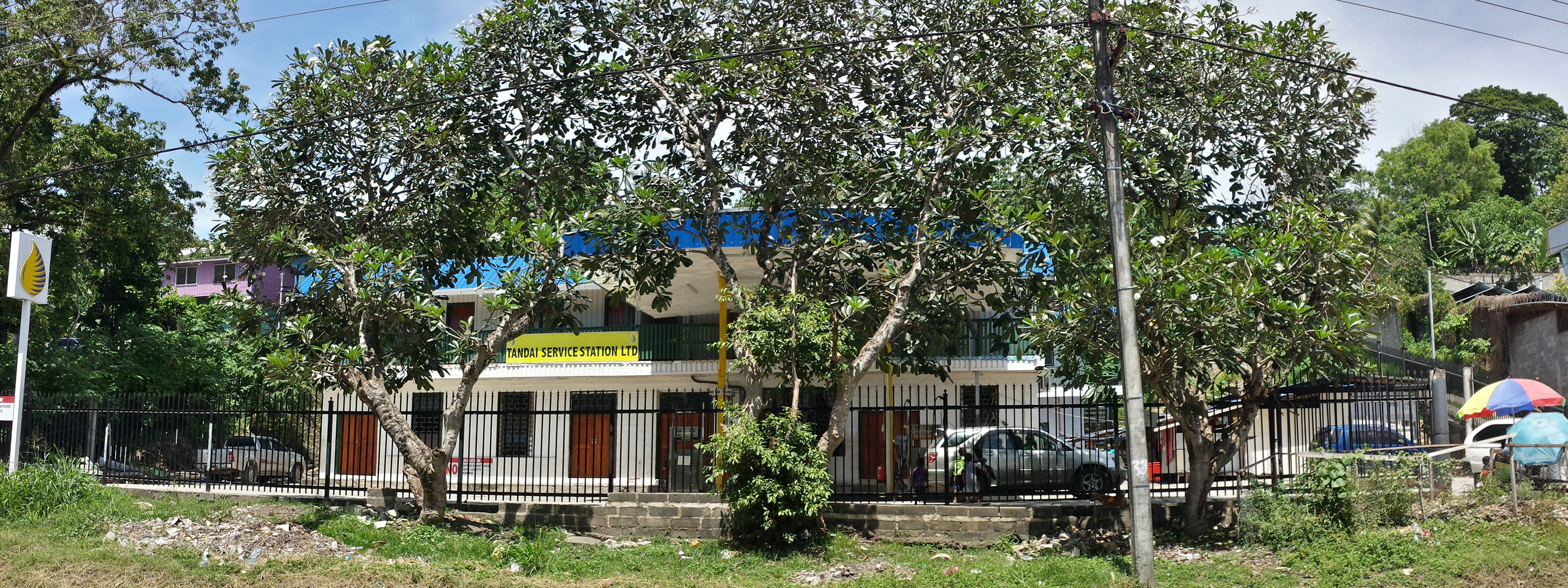
Tandai Service Station
